= Outlander (TV series) =

Historical fantasy TV series (2014–2026)

- Genre: Historical fantasy; Drama; Adventure; Romantic fantasy
- Based on: Outlander by Diana Gabaldon
- Developed by: Ronald D. Moore
- Showrunners: Ronald D. Moore; Toni Graphia; Matthew B. Roberts
- Starring: Caitríona Balfe; Sam Heughan
- Opening theme: "The Skye Boat Song"
- Composer: Bear McCreary
- Countries of origin: United Kingdom; United States
- Original languages: English; Scots; Scottish Gaelic; French
- No. of seasons: 8
- No. of episodes: 101 (list of episodes)

Production
- Executive producers: Ronald D. Moore; Jim Kohlberg; Andy Harries; Maril Davis; Ira Steven Behr; Toni Graphia; Anne Kenney; Matthew B. Roberts; Marigo Kehoe; Luke Schelhaas; Caitríona Balfe; Sam Heughan
- Producers: David Brown; Guy Tannahill; Michael Wilson
- Production locations: Scotland; Prague, Czech Republic; England; Cape Town, South Africa
- Cinematography: David Higgs; Neville Kidd; Denis Crossan; Martin Fuhrer; Stephen McNutt; Alasdair Walker; Michael Swan; Stijn van der Veken; Michael Coulter; Nic Lawson; Caroline Bridges; Scott Napier
- Editors: Michael O'Halloran; Liza Cardinale; Melissa Lawson Cheung; Stewart Schill; Fabienne Bouville; Miklos Wright; Nathan D. Gunn; Micky Blythe; Gena Bleier; Tammis Chandler; Alanah Jones; Amy D'Alessandro; Michelle Grainger; Sara Mineo
- Camera setup: Single-camera
- Running time: 53–90 minutes
- Production companies: Left Bank Pictures; Story Mining & Supply Co.; Tall Ship Productions; Sony Pictures Television (Note: Credited as Sony Pictures Television Studios from 2020 to 2024.)

Original release
- Network: Starz
- Release: August 9, 2014 – May 15, 2026

Related
- Outlander: Blood of My Blood

Outlander is a historical fantasy television series based on the book series of the same name by Diana Gabaldon. Developed by Ronald D. Moore, the show premiered on August 9, 2014, on Starz. It stars Caitríona Balfe as Claire Randall, an English former World War II military nurse in Scotland who, in 1945, finds herself transported back in time to 1743. There, she encounters and falls in love with a dashing Highland warrior named Jamie Fraser (Sam Heughan), a tacksman of Clan Mackenzie whom she later marries. Here, Claire becomes embroiled in the Jacobite rising.

Outlander consisted of a total of eight seasons and 101 episodes, with the finale airing in May 2026. A prequel series, titled Outlander: Blood of My Blood, which focuses on Jamie Fraser and Claire Beauchamp's parents, premiered in August 2025.

== Episodes ==
Season	Episodes		Originally released	
Season	Episodes		First released	Last released
1	16	8	August 9, 2014	September 27, 2014
1	16	8	April 4, 2015	May 30, 2015
2	13		April 9, 2016	July 9, 2016
3	13		September 10, 2017	December 10, 2017
4	13		November 4, 2018	January 27, 2019
5	12		February 16, 2020	May 10, 2020
6	8		March 6, 2022	May 1, 2022
7	16	8	June 16, 2023	August 11, 2023
7	16	8	November 22, 2024	January 17, 2025
8	10		March 6, 2026	May 15, 2026

== Plot ==
=== Season 1 (2014–2015) ===
The 16-episode first season of the television series is based on the first novel in the series, Outlander, and was released as two half-seasons, with the first part being aired from August to September 2014 and the second part from April to May 2015.

In 1945, Claire Randall, who had formerly served as a nurse in the British Army during the Second World War, and her husband Frank are visiting Inverness, Scotland, when she is carried back in time to 1743 by the stone circle at Craigh na Dun (in what is now Tay Forest Park). She falls in with a group of rebel Highlanders from Clan MacKenzie (a fictionalization of the real Clan MacKenzie), who are being pursued by government troops led by Captain Jonathan "Black Jack" Randall. Randall turns out to be Frank's ancestor. The Jacobite rebels are led by Dougal Mackenzie, war chief of the Clan, and include his sister's son, Jamie Fraser, and Jamie's godfather Murtagh Fraser. Jamie is wanted by the authorities.

Clan MacKenzie suspect Claire of being a government spy, but retain her as a healer, which prevents her from attempting to return to her own time. Knowing that the Jacobite cause is doomed to fail, she tries to warn the Highlanders against rebellion. Black Jack Randall suspects Claire of being a Scottish spy; he tortures her and plans to drag her to England for trial. Directed by Dougal, Claire marries Jamie Fraser, purely so she can receive the protection of his Clan, but Claire and Jamie quickly fall in love. This earns Claire the hatred of a Mackenzie woman named Laoghaire, who has a crush on Jamie. Claire befriends a healer named Geillis, who later turns out to be another time-traveller from the 20th century. Claire is captured, threatened, and almost raped by Randall at Fort William, but Jamie and his clansmen rescue her. The jealous Laoghaire denounces Claire and Geillis as witches. Geillis is sentenced to burn, but she and Ned Gowan, the MacKenzies' lawyer, collude to save Claire. After Claire is saved, both of them leave the castle and eventually make their way to Lallybroch, the Fraser family home, where Claire is regarded as the Lady of Lallybroch. However, their peaceful life is cut short by Jamie being captured and taken to Wentworth Prison by Randall. Claire and the clansmen rescue him from the prison, and they take refuge in a nearby monastery to help Jamie recover. Their time there is especially difficult for Claire as she discovers that Jamie's weird hallucinations and reactions to her affection after his rescue are the result of his having been tortured, drugged, and raped by the sadistic Randall. During one of his hallucinations, Jamie reveals that Randall branded part of his body. Distraught by the trauma, he confesses to Claire how ashamed and broken he is and wishes to die. Their deep honesty and Claire's compassion and sympathy give Jamie the motivation to keep on living. The season ends with Claire telling Jamie that she is pregnant as they set sail for the Kingdom of France.

=== Season 2 (2016) ===
The second season of 13 episodes, based on Dragonfly in Amber, aired from April to July 2016.

In 18th-century Paris, Claire and Jamie try to thwart the Jacobites by subverting the funds that King Louis XV is likely to provide. Jamie becomes the confidant of Charles Stuart, but the Frasers fail to prevent the Rising. Randall reappears in Paris, but Claire makes Jamie swear to keep him alive until Frank's descent is assured. She achieves this by convincing Randall to marry Mary Hawkins. Claire and Jamie's daughter Faith is stillborn, and she and her 18th-century husband return to Scotland. The Jacobites win the Battle of Prestonpans. Jamie and Claire also adopt a young French boy named Claudel, who Jamie renames Fergus.

Before the Battle of Culloden, Jamie convinces Claire, pregnant again, to return to the 20th century. Jamie decides to die fighting at Culloden with his clan. Back in her own century, Claire tells Frank about her time travel. He asks her to forget Jamie and let him raise her child as his own. Twenty years later, Frank has died in a car crash. Claire takes her 20-year-old daughter Brianna to Scotland. They encounter Roger Wakefield, a young historian whose adoptive father was a friend of Claire and Frank's. Through Roger's research, Claire discovers that Jamie did not die at Culloden. She vows to return to him.

=== Season 3 (2017) ===
The 13-episode third season, based on Voyager, aired from September to December 2017.

Jamie kills Randall at Culloden and is gravely injured, but spared execution. At Ardsmuir Prison, he befriends its governor, Lord John Grey, who later paroles him to work at an English estate. There, Jamie is manipulated into a sexual liaison and fathers an illegitimate son, William. Jamie returns to Scotland and becomes a printer.

In 1950, Claire enrolls in medical school in Boston, Massachusetts. Frank is killed in a car crash while Brianna is in college. With Roger Wakefield's help, Claire finds clues to Jamie's fate after Culloden. In 1968, she returns to the 18th century and discovers Jamie has married a widowed Laoghaire. Claire's return nullifies their union as illegal. They try to retrieve some hidden treasure so that he can placate Laoghaire with a settlement, but Jamie's nephew Ian is captured by pirates and taken to the West Indies. Jamie and Claire follow and rescue him from Geillis, who had escaped burning at the stake in season one. Claire and Jamie sail for Scotland but are shipwrecked on the coast of Georgia.

=== Season 4 (2018–2019) ===
The 13-episode fourth season, based on Drums of Autumn, aired from November 2018 to January 2019.

In the Province of North Carolina, Claire and Jamie seek to return to Scotland with Fergus, Marsali and Ian. They visit a plantation owned by Jamie's aunt Jocasta Cameron, where they encounter Black slaves. Claire and Jamie decide to leave and claim land that they name Fraser's Ridge, which is already inhabited by the Cherokee. Jamie reunites with Murtagh, now a blacksmith and leader of the Regulator Movement. Lord John visits with Jamie's son, Willy.

In the 1970s, Brianna rejects Roger's marriage proposal. After learning her parents will die in a fire, Brianna travels through the stones. When Roger discovers Brianna has left, he follows her. They meet in Wilmington, North Carolina, and enter into handfast marriage. Shortly after, they get into an argument and Roger leaves. In his absence, Stephen Bonnet rapes Brianna. She reunites with her mother and finally meets her biological father, Jamie. Brianna discovers she is pregnant. Roger goes to Fraser's Ridge, where Brianna's maid Lizzie wrongly assumes that he is the rapist. Lizzie informs Jamie, who beats Roger. Young Ian sells Roger to the Mohawk. Discovering their mistake, they set off to rescue Roger and Ian trades his freedom for Roger's. Roger and Brianna are reunited at Jocasta's plantation and Jamie receives instructions to kill Murtagh, who is a fugitive.

=== Season 5 (2020) ===
The fifth season of 12 episodes, based on The Fiery Cross and the beginning of A Breath of Snow and Ashes, aired from February to May 2020.

Jamie and Claire fight to retain their home at Fraser's Ridge as the American Revolutionary War looms on the horizon. Brianna and Roger marry and Governor William Tryon further pushes Jamie to hunt down Murtagh, forcing Jamie to gather up a militia and counteract the Regulators. He struggles to balance keeping his godfather safe and fulfilling his duties to the Crown, especially under the eye of Lieutenant Knox, who is determined to find and kill Murtagh. Despite Murtagh's pleas for Jocasta to return his love for her, she moves forward with her fourth marriage, choosing the safety and security of her plantation's future over his idealism. Jamie's loyalties are pushed to the breaking point at the Battle of Alamance, when Roger's attempt to warn Murtagh fails and Murtagh is shot dead. Roger is captured and mistakenly hanged by Tryon's soldiers; he survives, but is left traumatized by the experience. Jamie is left devastated in the months following the battle.

Meanwhile, Roger and Brianna's relationship is put to the test as there are signs of Stephen Bonnet's reappearance, forcing Brianna to take matters into her own hands when she is captured by him. Eventually, Brianna and Roger decide to go back through the stones when they realize Jemmy can too, as the future will be much safer for their son. Their attempt fails and the two, taking this as a sign of fate, decide to stay at Fraser's Ridge, along with their large family. Young Ian returns from his time with the Mohawk and learns the truth about Claire, Brianna, and Roger's origins when he confronts them with information passed to him by the Mohawk. Claire continues to subvert conventional medical practices by producing penicillin and covertly providing medical advice under a pseudonym, but her subversive advice backfires on her. Claire is abducted and gang raped by Lionel Brown and his men, but is subsequently rescued by Jamie, Fergus, Roger, and the other men of the Ridge. A wounded Lionel is taken alive back to the Ridge, but Marsali kills him with poison in revenge for his assault on Claire. Though Jamie returns Lionel's body to Richard, Lionel's brother and mayor of Brownsville, Richard subtly threatens Fraser's Ridge and Jamie's family.

=== Season 6 (2022) ===
The sixth season of 8 episodes, based on A Breath of Snow and Ashes, aired from March to May 2022.

The political unrest in the colonies begins to boil over and the Frasers (Jamie and Claire) and the MacKenzies (Roger and Brianna), try to peacefully live on their isolated homestead in the foothills of North Carolina. Jamie is suddenly faced with walking between the fires of loyalty to the oath he swore to the Crown and following his hope for freedom in the new world. Trouble continues with the Browns as they form a committee of safety that threatens the peace on the ridge, driving a wedge between the Native Americans, the colonists, and the Frasers. In the meantime, the Christie family arrive on the Ridge, a throwback to Jamie's time in Ardsmuir Prison, and begin to influence the harmony on the Ridge. Malva Christie, the daughter of Tom Christie, takes a liking to Claire only to betray her in announcing her pregnancy with Jamie as the father. The season ends with a huge amount of unrest involving the Browns and the Christies as Jamie and Claire's grip on Fraser's Ridge becomes ever more fragile.

=== Season 7 (2023–2025) ===
The seventh season, which consists of 16 episodes, is based on the end of A Breath of Snow and Ashes, An Echo in the Bone, Written in My Own Heart's Blood and elements of Go Tell the Bees That I Am Gone, and was released as two half-seasons, with the first part aired from June to August 2023 and the second part from November 2024 to January 2025.

Jamie and Claire Fraser are plunged directly into the violent birth of the United States. Following Claire's harrowing rescue from the gallows in Wilmington, where she was falsely accused of murder, the Frasers must navigate the treacherous landscape of the American Revolution. Meanwhile, facing a life-threatening heart defect for their newborn daughter, Mandy, Brianna and Roger MacKenzie make the agonizing decision to take her and their son, Jemmy, back through the stones to the 20th century. Settling in the 1980s at Lallybroch, they confront new dangers as modern-day intruders threaten their family over a conspiracy involving hidden Jacobite gold.

Back in the 18th century, the once-peaceful Fraser's Ridge is fractured by the war. Jamie, Claire, and Young Ian are drawn into the Continental Army, participating in the pivotal Battles of Saratoga. The conflict forces Jamie to face the agonizing possibility of fighting across the battlefield from his secret Loyalist son, William Ransom. Wearied by the harsh realities of a war pitting neighbor against neighbor, the Frasers eventually resolve to leave America behind and make a perilous journey back to their ancestral home in Scotland.

=== Season 8 (2026) ===
The ten-episode eighth and final season was aired between March and May 2026, and was based on Go Tell the Bees That I Am Gone and parts of A Blessing for a Warrior Going Out, the upcoming tenth and final novel in the series.

Brianna, Roger, and their children return to the 18th century. Among the gifts they bring with them is a book titled Soul of a Rebel written by Frank and published posthumously. Detailing the role of Scots in the revolutionary war, it warns that violence will spread to the backcountry, forcing Jamie to raise a militia and fight at the Battle of Kings Mountain where he dies. Jamie hears the voice of "Black Jack" Randall as he reads it, and questions what motivation Frank had when writing of his death. Meanwhile Jamie's son William struggles with his identity after learning that he is a bastard. He finds comfort in the company of Amaranthus Cowden Grey, claiming to be the widow of his cousin Ben Grey, while investigating the unusual circumstances of Ben's death.

The Frasers attempt to resist fate and avoid political tensions at the Ridge as they learn that a supposedly retired British officer, Captain Cunningham, has become influential in the community. Meanwhile Benjamin Cleveland, whom Jamie is fated to fight alongside, poses a different problem as he kills Loyalists on Jamie's land and threatens Jamie and his family. As the Frasers are dragged into war once again, Young Ian and his new wife find themselves travelling north to learn of the fate of his son and former wife after learning that the Mohawk were attacked in retaliation by the Patriots. Fergus Fraser receives revelations about who fathered him, and Lord John becomes victim in a scheme to deter the British from withdrawing from the war. The final episode sees much of the main cast united at the Ridge as Jamie goes to meet his fate, confident that Frank was not lying but uncertain as to whether he could have been mistaken.

== Cast and characters ==
- Caitríona Balfe as Claire Fraser
- Sam Heughan as James "Jamie" Fraser
- Tobias Menzies as Frank Randall (seasons 1–4, 8) (Note: Menzies only appears in one episode of season four, although credited as a main cast member. Voice only in season eight.) and Jonathan "Black Jack" Randall (seasons 1–3, 8) (Note: Voice only in season eight.)
- Graham McTavish as Dougal MacKenzie (seasons 1–2; guest season 7) and William "Buck" MacKenzie (season 5)
- Duncan Lacroix as Murtagh Fitzgibbons Fraser (seasons 1–5)
- Grant O'Rourke as Rupert MacKenzie (seasons 1–3) (Note: O'Rourke only appears in one episode of season three, although credited as a main cast member.)
- Stephen Walters as Angus Mhor (seasons 1–2)
- Gary Lewis as Colum MacKenzie (seasons 1–2)
- Lotte Verbeek as Geillis Duncan a.k.a. Gillian Edgars (seasons 1–3; guest season 7) (Note: Verbeek only appears in one episode of season two, although credited as a main cast member.)
- Bill Paterson as Edward "Ned" Gowan (seasons 1, 3) (Note: Paterson only appears in one episode of season three, although credited as a main cast member.)
- Simon Callow as Clarence Marylebone, Duke of Sandringham (seasons 1–2) (Note: Callow only appears in one episode of season one, although credited as a main cast member.)
- Laura Donnelly as Janet "Jenny" Fraser Murray (seasons 1–3) (Note: Donnelly only appears in one episode of season two, although credited as a main cast member.)
- Douglas Henshall as Taran MacQuarrie (season 1)
- Steven Cree as Ian Murray (seasons 1–4; guest season 7) (Note: Cree only appears in one episode of season two and one episode of season four, although credited as a main cast member.)
- Stanley Weber as Le Comte St. Germain (season 2)
- Andrew Gower as Prince Charles Edward Stuart (seasons 2–3; guest season 6) (Note: Gower only appears in one episode of season three, although credited as a main cast member.)
- Rosie Day as Mary Hawkins (season 2)
- Dominique Pinon as Master Raymond (season 2; guest season 7, 8)
- Frances de la Tour as Mother Hildegarde (season 2)
- Nell Hudson as Laoghaire MacKenzie (seasons 2–4; recurring season 1; guest season 7) (Note: Hudson only appears in one episode of season two, one episode of season three and one episode of season four, although credited as a main cast member.)
- Clive Russell as Simon Fraser, Lord Lovat (season 2) (Note: Russell only appears in one episode of season two, although credited as a main cast member.)
- Richard Rankin as Roger MacKenzie (seasons 2–8) (Note: Rankin only appears in one episode of season two, although credited as a main cast member.)
- Sophie Skelton as Brianna "Bree" Fraser MacKenzie (seasons 2–8) (Note: Skelton only appears in one episode of season two, although credited as a main cast member.)
- David Berry as Lord John Grey (seasons 3–8) (Note: Berry only appears in one episode of season six, although credited as a main cast member.)
- John Bell as Ian Fraser Murray (seasons 3–8)
- César Domboy as Fergus Claudel Fraser (seasons 3–6, 8)
- Lauren Lyle as Marsali MacKimmie Fraser (seasons 3–6, 8)
- Richard Dillane as Captain Raines (season 3)
- Edward Speleers as Stephen Bonnet (seasons 4–5)
- Maria Doyle Kennedy as Jocasta MacKenzie Cameron (seasons 4–6) (Note: Doyle Kennedy only appears in one episode of season six, although credited as a main cast member.)
- Colin McFarlane as Ulysses (seasons 4–5)
- Natalie Simpson as Phaedre (season 4)
- Tantoo Cardinal as Adawehi (season 4)
- Caitlin O'Ryan as Lizzie Wemyss (seasons 4–8)
- Braeden Clarke as Kaheroton (seasons 4, 6) (Note: Clarke only appears in one episode of season six, although credited as a main cast member.)
- Gregory Dominic Odjig as Satehoronies (season 4)
- Billy Boyd as Gerald Forbes (seasons 4–5) (Note: Boyd only appears in one episode of season four, although credited as a main cast member.)
- Carmen Moore as Wahkatiiosta (season 4)
- Tom Jackson as Tehwahsehwkwe (seasons 4, 6) (Note: Jackson only appears in one episode of season six, although credited as a main cast member.)
- Yan Tual as Father Alexandre Ferigault (season 4) (Note: Tual only appears in one episode of season four, although credited as a main cast member.)
- Sera-Lys McArthur as Johiehon (season 4) (Note: McArthur only appears in one episode of season four, although credited as a main cast member.)
- Chris Larkin as Richard Brown (seasons 5–7)
- Ned Dennehy as Lionel Brown (seasons 5–6)
- Mark Lewis Jones as Tom Christie (seasons 6–7)
- Antony Byrne as Hiram Crombie (seasons 6, 8; guest season 7)
- Glen Gould as Chief Bird (season 6)
- Simon R. Baker as Still Water (season 6)
- Gail Maurice as Tsotehweh (season 6) (Note: Maurice only appears in one episode of season six, although credited as a main cast member.)
- Charles Vandervaart as William Ransom (seasons 7–8)
- Izzy Meikle-Small as Rachel Hunter (season 8, recurring season 7)
- Kieran Bew as Captain Charles Cunningham (season 8)
- Frances Tomelty as Elspeth Cunningham (season 8)
- Turlough Convery as Benjamin Cleveland (season 8; recurring season 8) (Note: Credited with the main cast in episodes nine and ten.)

== Production ==
=== Development ===
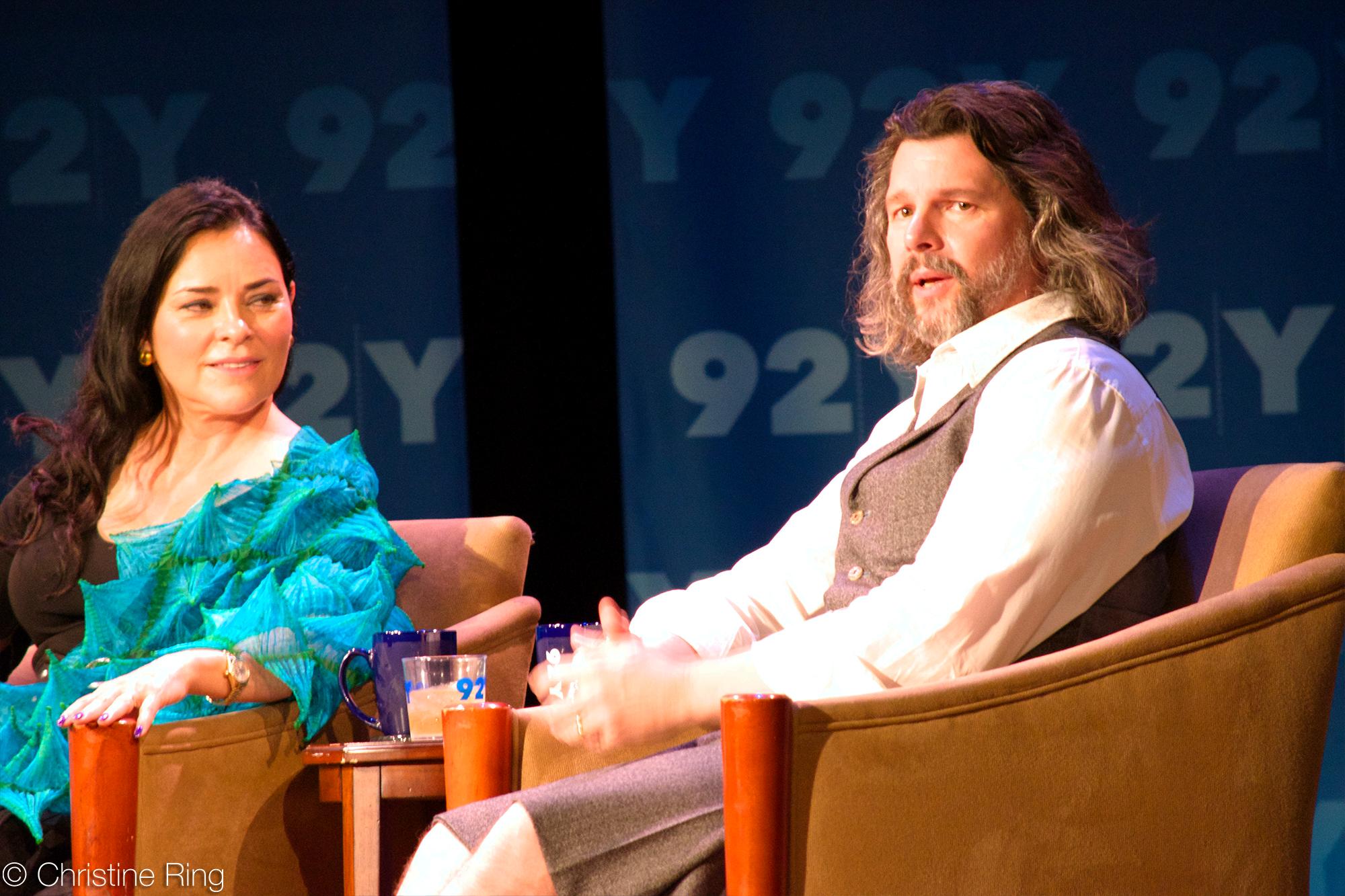
Ronald D. Moore (right) is the developer and showrunner of the Outlander TV series, which is based on the Outlander novel series written by Diana Gabaldon (left).

In July 2012, it was reported that Sony Pictures Television had secured the rights to Gabaldon's Outlander series, with Moore attached to develop the project and Jim Kohlberg (Story Mining and Supply Co) producing. Sony completed the deal with Starz in November 2012, and Moore hired a writing team in April 2013. That June, Starz picked up the Outlander project for a sixteen-episode order, and in August it was announced that John Dahl would direct the first two episodes. Starz CEO Chris Albrecht later said that he had green-lit several genre projects, including Outlander, to shift the network's series development toward "audiences that were being underserved" to "drive a real fervent fan base that then becomes the kind of advocacy group for the shows themselves".

Calling it "a different kind of show than has ever been on, in my memory", Albrecht believed that Outlander's combination of fantasy, action, a strong central romance, and a feminist focus would set it apart. Another distinguishing feature of the show is its use of Scottish Gaelic. Àdhamh Ó Broin is the language consultant and Griogair Labhruidh sang in Gaelic on the second season's soundtrack.

On August 15, 2014, after only the pilot episode had aired, the network renewed the series for a second season of at least thirteen episodes, based on the second book in Gabaldon's series, Dragonfly in Amber. On June 1, 2016, Starz renewed the series for a third and fourth season, which adapt the third and fourth Outlander novels, Voyager and Drums of Autumn.

On May 9, 2018, Starz renewed the series for a fifth and sixth season, which adapt The Fiery Cross and A Breath of Snow and Ashes, respectively and each season to consist of twelve episodes. Balfe and Heughan became producers on the show beginning with Season 5 to have more input and influence over production.

On March 14, 2021, the series was renewed for a seventh season, originally to consist of 12 episodes and adapt the seventh novel, An Echo in the Bone. On June 1, 2021, Starz announced the sixth season would premiere in early 2022 with a shortened eight-episode season, while the seventh season would consist of 16 episodes, which ended up incorporating A Breath of Snow and Ashes, An Echo in the Bone, the eighth novel Written in My Own Heart's Blood and elements of the ninth novel Go Tell the Bees That I Am Gone. On November 22, 2021, Gabaldon announced that the sixth season would premiere on March 6, 2022.

In January 2023, the series was renewed for an eighth and final season to consist of 10 episodes, with one key reason being the cast's desire to move on to other projects. According to reports in August of the year, filming was delayed due to the 2023 Hollywood labor disputes. A start date had been set, but Balfe said there had been no confirmation as to when work would actually commence. The writer's strike is "... obviously a big thing that's going on at the moment Stateside and that may change things. But you know, it's too early to start speculating about that". There was some discussion as to how the series will conclude; Gabaldon was writing the final book but that was not expected to be ready in time for the conclusion to also be used for the series. Executive producer Maril Davis made this comment: "I think about it a lot, I think we're going to do a great job and I have complete confidence in the writers, but we'll see what happens. I'm really confident we'll figure out a way to end it for ourselves". Davis added that they did plan to discuss the proposed ending with the author before finalizing the scripts. In November 2024, Davis and Gabaldon said the final season would mainly cover the ninth novel and "little pieces" of the unpublished tenth novel.

Around the time of the release of the second half the seventh season in November 2024 and subsequently, both Caitriona Balfe and Sam Heughan suggested they would be open to returning to their roles in the future for a continuation of the series, such as an adaptation of the not yet released tenth novel.

=== Writing ===
Moore said of the pilot:

There's a lot of things we did in the first thirty to forty minutes that aren't in the book or are compilations of things that happened in the book.

Moore emphasised that he did not want to present the time-travel dimension in a traditional special effects-laden science fiction manner.

Describing the adaptation of the first season as "straightforward", Moore explained:

It was always kind of clear what the basic structure was: Claire's trying to get home, then she meets this guy, now she's falling in love, now she has a conflict, will she go home. You lay it out in a very linear fashion.

Moore addressed the darker tone of the season's second half, emphasizing that "the show becomes more complicated and the emotional journey more wrenching".

Regarding the second season and the source novel Dragonfly in Amber, Moore said:

The book is a more complicated structure in terms of how Diana [Gabaldon] wrote it ... So it was not as easy an adaptation as the first season was ... Book 2 is just a more complex book. It's laid out very differently, as a result it took more wrangling to try to figure out how to translate this particular story into our season. There were more complications, there were more characters ... It was a bigger task. The thing that gives me the most comfort is that Diana likes it a lot. She had said, 'Oh, I really liked the way you did it. It was a difficult plot, I know, but I think you really found the essence of it. You really found the through line that really defines what this part of the journey is.' ... It's not going to be a literal adaptation because I don't think that's possible with the second book ... But I think it's very much the same story, the major characters are all represented, the major scenes are all represented, and it still gets you to all the same places you want to go.

Gabaldon was employed as consultant to the TV production.

In June 2015, Gabaldon commented on the adaptation of the first season:

I think they did condense it very effectively ... I ended up getting most of the things that I felt strongly about in there. There were only a few instances where the most important stuff in my opinion didn't get in.

In March 2015, Gabaldon said of the scripts for season two:

The Parisian stuff is very good and in fact I'm deeply impressed by the outlines I've seen ... I think they've done a wonderful job of pulling out the most important plot elements and arranging them in a convincing way.

Gabaldon wrote the screenplay for the episode "Vengeance is Mine".

According to Moore, the writing and pre-production for season four began while season three was still in active production. Gabaldon wrote an episode for the fifth season.

=== Casting ===
Promotional poster for season one, featuring Caitríona Balfe and Sam Heughan

On July 9, 2013, it was announced that Sam Heughan had been cast as Jamie Fraser, the male lead. Tobias Menzies was the second actor cast, on August 8, in dual roles of Frank and Jonathan Randall. Stephen Walters and Annette Badland were announced in the recurring roles of Angus Mhor and Mrs. Fitzgibbons on August 29, 2013, with Graham McTavish and Gary Lewis announced as the MacKenzie brothers on the September 4. Series female lead Claire Beauchamp Randall would be portrayed by Caitríona Balfe as announced on September 11, 2013. The series later added Lotte Verbeek as Geillis Duncan and Laura Donnelly as Jamie's sister Jenny in October 2013.

In December 2013, Simon Callow was cast in the supporting role of Duke of Sandringham, and Entertainment Weekly reported in April 2014 that Steven Cree would portray Ian Murray. Bill Paterson was cast as lawyer Ned Gowan in June 2014. Author Gabaldon has a cameo as Iona MacTavish in the August 2014 episode "The Gathering". In August 2014 it was announced that Frazer Hines had been cast in the role of a prison warden in an episode to air in 2015. From 1966 to 1969, Hines had portrayed the Doctor Who character Jamie McCrimmon, who Gabaldon said had inspired the setting of the Outlander series and the character of Jamie Fraser. Hines plays Sir Fletcher Gordon, an English prison warden, in the May 2015 episode "Wentworth Prison".

In June 2015, the series cast Andrew Gower as the Jacobite pretender Prince Charles Edward Stuart; Robert Cavanah as Jamie's Scottish cousin Jared, a wine merchant and Jacobite living in Paris; Margaux Châtelier as Annalise de Marillac, Jamie's French ex-lover; and Laurence Dobiesz as Alex Randall, Black Jack's younger–and gentler–brother. Other cast added for season 2 include Romann Berrux as the French pickpocket Fergus, Rosie Day as the baronet's daughter Mary Hawkins, Stanley Weber as Le Comte St. Germain, Dominique Pinon as healer Master Raymond, Marc Duret as French Minister of Finance Joseph Duverney, Frances de la Tour as Mother Hildegarde, and Audrey Brisson as Sister Angelique. In July 2015, Lionel Lingelser was cast as King Louis XV. Moore revealed in June 2015 that Verbeek would be returning in the role of Geillis. Richard Rankin was cast as Roger Wakefield in December 2015, while Sophie Skelton was chosen to portray Brianna Randall, Claire and Jamie's daughter, in January 2016.

In August 2016, Starz announced that David Berry had been cast as Lord John William Grey for season three. In September, Wil Johnson was cast as Joe Abernathy and John Bell as "Young Ian" Fraser Murray. In October, César Domboy was cast as an adult Fergus and Lauren Lyle as Laoghaire's daughter Marsali MacKimmie. Hannah James and Tanya Reynolds were cast as sisters Geneva and Isobel Dunsany in November 2016.

In October 2017, two season four roles were announced. Maria Doyle Kennedy was cast as Jamie's aunt, Jocasta and Ed Speleers as Stephen Bonnet, an Irish pirate and smuggler. The casting of Colin McFarlane as Jocasta's slave butler Ulysses was announced in January 2018. The Cherokee and Mohawk people in seasons four and five were portrayed by members of First Nations from Canada who traveled to Scotland for the filming.

In May 2020, Berry announced that he would not be returning to Outlander for the sixth season. Nevertheless, he made a guest appearance in one episode in season six.

In May 2022, it was announced that Canadian actor Charles Vandervaart had been cast to play William Ransom, Jamie's son who was raised by Lord John Grey since season three. In October 2022, it was confirmed that Graham McTavish, Nell Hudson, Steven Cree and Lotte Verbeek would reprise their roles in the seventh season.

=== Filming ===
In July 2013, British Chancellor of the Exchequer George Osborne confirmed that the production would benefit from the Creative Sector Tax Relief programme implemented in the UK in 2012, which extends film tax reliefs to high-end television productions. The Scottish government also agreed to help pay for the conversion of a warehouse complex in Wardpark Industrial Estate, near Cumbernauld, into a film studio. Principal photography began on location in Scotland in September 2013. The Cumbernauld studios were used for on set filming, with location shoots taking place at Doune Castle, Stirling; mills in East Linton, East Lothian; Newtonmore in the Scottish Highlands; Rothiemurchus Forest, Aviemore; quarries near Bathgate, West Lothian and Aberfoyle, Stirling, as well as Linlithgow Palace, Loch Rannoch in the Highlands and Falkland and Culross in Fife. Such settings have attracted substantial numbers of international tourists.

Filming for season two began in April 2015, to air in spring 2016. The primary setting for the season is Paris, which Moore explained is being recreated using other locations. Some interiors were filmed on the show's Scotland soundstages, while Prague was used for the exterior street scenes and the Palace of Versailles. In addition some palaces in the south of England which have French rooms and architecture were used as Parisian interiors and part of Versailles. Moore noted that season two of Outlander "will look completely different than season one" with a "richer, more dynamic kind of visual palette". With the change of setting from Scotland to France, he said that "visually you've moved from the heavy woods and stone of season 1 into the finery of the Parisian apartments". He explained:

Everything about Paris is so completely different, especially the costumes ... It's the most stylish city in the world during this time. A lot more money. A lot of finery. Scotland is featuring a lot of heavy wools and more organic colors. In Paris everyone wants to be a peacock. You've got a much wider palette of textiles and colors and styles than you did in Scotland. It's a completely different world. And that kind of goes across the board for all the departments ... There were really no sets or pieces of sets that we could use for Paris that we'd used for Scotland ... There are carriages, there are servants with livery, there are props and furniture. It's completely different. It's a whole new show.

Production on season three began in September 2016 in Scotland and filming took place in Cape Town from March to June 2017. Filming completed on June 16, 2017.

In August 2017, Moore said that for season four, locations in Scotland would double as 18th-century America and some of the mountains and rivers of North Carolina would be recreated using locations in Eastern Europe. Production for season four was completed in Scotland by July 5, 2018.

Production on season five, set primarily in North Carolina, began in Scotland in April 2019. Locations included Kinloch Rannoch (for Craigh na Dun), the Thomas Coats Memorial Baptist Church in Paisley, The Hermitage, Dunkeld in Perthshire and Milne Woods in Bridge of Allan. Much of the filming was completed at Wardpark Studios.

Production on season six was scheduled to begin in May 2020, but was delayed due to the COVID-19 pandemic. Production eventually began in February 2021.

Production for season seven began in April 2022, while filming began in May 2022 in Scotland.

Production for the eighth and final season began in March 2024 and ended on September 27, 2024.

=== Music ===
The music is composed by Bear McCreary. The title song is an adaptation of Robert Louis Stevenson's poem Sing Me a Song of a Lad That Is Gone, set to the tune of the Scottish folk song "The Skye Boat Song" and is sung by McCreary's wife Raya Yarbrough. For the first half of season two, the second verse of the opening theme is sung in French to reflect the season's French setting. For the second half of season three, the second verse of the opening theme has Caribbean music to reflect the season's Jamaican setting. The fourth season opening theme has a colonial American sound. The theme song is sung by Sinéad O'Connor for the seventh season, which was the final song recorded by O'Connor before her death in July 2023. For the eighth and final season, the theme song is sung by Annie Lennox. The final episode of the series used the theme song and the accompanying opening title sequence from the first season.

== Release ==
Outlander premiered in the United States on August 9, 2014. Its first eight episodes aired through September and the remaining eight episodes resumed in April 2015. The first-season finale aired on May 30, 2015. The second season of 13 episodes premiered on April 9, 2016, and the 13-episode third season on September 10, 2017. The fourth season premiered on November 4, 2018, and the fifth on February 16, 2020. The sixth season premiered on March 6, 2022. The first part of the seventh season premiered on June 16, 2023, and the second part premiered on November 22, 2024. As of 2024, the first six seasons are available on Netflix in the United States.

Outlander debuted in Australia on SoHo on August 14, 2014, and began airing in Canada on Showcase on August 24, 2014. The series also premiered on October 21, 2014, in Ireland. In the United Kingdom, it was acquired by Amazon Prime Video, where it premiered on March 26, 2015 In April 2015, The Herald reported that emails leaked in the Sony Pictures Entertainment hack suggested that the broadcast delay in the UK may have been due to sensitivity about the September 2014 Scottish independence referendum. The show later aired on More4 from 2017 to 2019. It later became available through Lionsgate+ and then MGM+ after the former shut down in the U.K. In New Zealand, Outlander was previously distributed by the video streaming service Lightbox. Following Sky's acquisition of Lightbox, Sky's streaming service Neon acquired the distribution rights to Outlander in New Zealand.

== Reception ==
=== Critical response ===
Critical response of Outlander
Season	Rotten Tomatoes	Metacritic
1	92% (263 reviews)	73 (34 reviews)
2	92% (234 reviews)	85 (11 reviews)
3	90% (195 reviews)	87 (6 reviews)
4	88% (170 reviews)	71 (6 reviews)
5	86% (142 reviews)	73 (4 reviews)
6	89% (9 reviews)	—N/a
7	95% (18 reviews)	75 (4 reviews)
8	100% (45 reviews)	80 (7 reviews)

On Rotten Tomatoes, the average rating of the overall series is 91%, while on Metacritic the average rating is 76 out of 100.

==== Season 1 ====
The first season received mostly positive reviews. On Metacritic, it has a rating of 73 out of 100, based on 34 reviews, indicating "generally favorable" reviews. On Rotten Tomatoes, the season has a 92% rating based on 263 reviews. The website's critical consensus reads: "Outlander is a unique, satisfying adaptation of its source material, brought to life by lush scenery and potent chemistry between its leads".

The Huffington Post called the first episode "... A masterpiece of impressive depth ... It is amazing!" Entertainment Weekly gave the premiere an "A−" rating, writing that it was "sexy and smart and stirring". Matt Zoller Seitz of New York magazine also praised the series, calling it "defiantly its own thing: part romance-novel fantasy, part time-travel story and part wartime drama (set across two time periods)". Sonia Saraiya of The A.V. Club gave the first six episodes an A, writing that it "does for 1743 Scotland what Downton Abbey does for 1912 England" and adding that "Outlander succeeds admirably ... it refuses to sit comfortably in any genre."

British reception was more mixed. Alastair McKay of The Evening Standard quoted Saraiya's comparison with Downton Abbey, adding "[The comparison] is entirely correct. It is magical-mystical heuchter-teuchter cobblers." Euan Ferguson of The Observer called it "gorgeous drivel" and Thomas Batten of The Guardian stated "If you love the scenery, shifting allegiances and palace intrigue of [Game of Thrones], but find yourself wishing the pace were a little slower and that the sex scenes were filmed in a more pretentious manner with lots of slow pans and softer lighting, here's your show." Graeme Virtue noted "the rather languid pace of the opening episodes", but praised the show's "rare acknowledgment of the female gaze" in its treatment of sex scenes. The Daily Telegraph also made the Game of Thrones comparison, while The Independent stated "...yes, it's a time-travelling, wish-fulfilment fantasy, but it's done with such flair and attention to detail that it's impossible not to hop on board for the ride."

==== Season 2 ====
The second season received from Metacritic a score of 85 out of 100 based on 11 reviews, indicating "universal acclaim". On Rotten Tomatoes, it reports a 92% rating based on 234 reviews. The website consensus reads: "Outlander returns for a second addictive season of mystery and sweeping romance as Claire and Jamie take on Paris." Based on five episodes for review, Marah Eakin of The A.V. Club gave it a perfect "A" grade and wrote, "It's not just well-written and lovely to look at. It's downright immersive. ... Outlander feels important–even moreso in its second season."

==== Season 3 ====
The third season has a Metacritic score of 87 out of 100 based on 6 reviews, indicating "universal acclaim". Rotten Tomatoes reports a 90% rating based on 195 reviews. The website consensus reads: "Outlander's epic love story returns with the same strong storytelling and an added layer of maturity." Based on six episodes for review, Liz Shannon Miller of IndieWire gave it an "A"-grade review and wrote, "This is a show that's grown and matured since its initial premiere in ways that defied our initial expectations."

==== Season 4 ====
The fourth season received mostly positive reviews. It has a Metacritic score of 71 out of 100 based on 6 reviews, indicating "generally favorable" reviews. Rotten Tomatoes reports an 88% rating based on 170 reviews. The website consensus reads: "Outlander's epic romance settles into a violent fourth season, planting its flag on the American frontier while treading on darker themes."

==== Season 5 ====
The fifth season also received mostly positive reviews. It has a Metacritic score of 73 out of 100 based on 4 reviews, indicating "generally favorable" reviews. Rotten Tomatoes reports an 86% rating based on 142 reviews. The website consensus reads: "Outlander's romantic ardor doesn't burn as bright in this fifth season, but the Frasers remain an enthralling pair as they try to forge a home together."

==== Season 6 ====
The sixth season has an 89% rating on Rotten Tomatoes based on 9 reviews.

==== Season 7 ====
The seventh season has a 95% rating on Rotten Tomatoes based on 18 reviews. On Metacritic, it has received a score of 75 out of 100 based on 4 reviews, indicating "generally favorable" reviews.

==== Season 8 ====
The eighth season has a 100% rating on Rotten Tomatoes based on 45 reviews. On Metacritic, it has received a score of 80 out of 100 based on 7 reviews, indicating "generally favorable" reviews.

=== Ratings ===
The first eight episodes averaged more than 5.1 million multiplatform viewers. In July 2015, noting Outlander's strong ratings, its "vocal online fandom and a slew of think pieces tied to its feminist twists on the action genre", Josef Adalian of Vulture credited Outlander as one of the series responsible for Starz's increased success against competitors like Showtime. On February 11, 2020, cable provider Comcast moved Starz from its base cable packages to an a la carte option. This occurred five days before the premiere of season five.

Viewership and ratings per season of Outlander
Season	Timeslot (ET)	Episodes	First aired		Last aired		Avg. viewers (millions)
Season	Timeslot (ET)	Episodes	Date	Viewers (millions)	Date	Viewers (millions)	Avg. viewers (millions)
1	Saturday 9:00 pm	16	August 9, 2014	0.72	May 30, 2015	0.98	1.04
2	Saturday 9:00 pm	13	April 9, 2016	1.46	July 9, 2016	1.15	1.09
3	Sunday 8:00 pm	13	September 10, 2017	1.49	December 10, 2017	1.43	1.51
4	Sunday 8:00 pm	13	November 4, 2018	1.08	January 27, 2019	1.45	1.04
5	Sunday 8:00 pm	12	February 16, 2020	0.82	May 10, 2020	0.86	0.81
6	Sunday 9:00 pm	8	March 6, 2022	0.64	May 1, 2022	0.44	0.52
7	Friday 8:00 pm	16	June 16, 2023	0.39	January 17, 2025	0.36	N/A
8	Friday 8:00 pm	10	March 6, 2026	N/A	May 15, 2026	N/A	N/A

== Accolades ==
Year	Association	Category	Nominee(s)	Result	Ref.
2014	Critics' Choice Television Awards	Most Exciting New Series	Outlander	Won	
2015	People's Choice Awards	Favorite Cable Sci-Fi/Fantasy Show	Outlander	Won	
2015	Saturn Awards	Best Television Presentation	Outlander	Nominated	
2015	Saturn Awards	Best Actor on Television	Tobias Menzies	Nominated	
2015	Saturn Awards	Best Actress on Television	Caitríona Balfe	Won	
2015	Saturn Awards	Best Supporting Actor on Television	Sam Heughan	Nominated	
2015	Irish Film & Television Awards	Best Actress in a Lead Role Drama	Caitríona Balfe	Nominated	
2015	Irish Film & Television Awards	Rising Star Award	Caitríona Balfe	Nominated	
2015	Emmy Awards	Outstanding Music Composition for a Series (Original Dramatic Score)	Bear McCreary for "Sassenach"	Nominated	
2016	People's Choice Awards	Favorite Cable TV Sci-Fi/Fantasy Show	Outlander	Won	
2016	People's Choice Awards	Favorite Sci-Fi/Fantasy TV Actor	Sam Heughan	Nominated	
2016	People's Choice Awards	Favorite Sci-Fi/Fantasy TV Actress	Caitríona Balfe	Won	
2016	Golden Globe Awards	Best Television Series – Drama	Outlander	Nominated	
2016	Golden Globe Awards	Best Actress – Television Series Drama	Caitríona Balfe	Nominated	
2016	Golden Globe Awards	Best Supporting Actor – Series, Miniseries or Television Film	Tobias Menzies	Nominated	
2016	Costume Designers Guild Awards	Outstanding Period Television Series	Terry Dresbach	Nominated	
2016	Critics' Choice Awards	Most Bingeworthy Series	Outlander	Won	
2016	Women's Image Network Awards	Outstanding Drama Series	Outlander for "The Garrison Commander"	Won	
2016	Women's Image Network Awards	Outstanding Actress in a Drama Series	Caitríona Balfe for "The Garrison Commander"	Won	
2016	Women's Image Network Awards	Outstanding Show Written by a Woman	Anne Kenney for "The Wedding"	Nominated	
2016	Women's Image Network Awards	Outstanding Show Written by a Woman	Toni Graphia for "The Devil's Mark"	Won	
2016	Women's Image Network Awards	Outstanding Show Directed by a Woman	Anna Foerster for "The Wedding"	Nominated	
2016	Saturn Awards	Best Fantasy Television Series	Outlander	Won	
2016	Saturn Awards	Best Actress on Television	Caitríona Balfe	Won	
2016	Saturn Awards	Best Actor on Television	Sam Heughan	Nominated	
2016	Irish Film & Television Awards	Best Actress in a Lead Role Drama	Caitríona Balfe	Nominated	
2016	Costume Society of America	Costume Design Award	Terry Dresbach	Won	
2016	Emmy Awards	Outstanding Costumes for a Period/Fantasy Series, Limited Series or Movie	Terry Dresbach, Elle Wilson, Nadine Powell and Anna Lau for "Not in Scotland Anymore"	Nominated	
2016	Emmy Awards	Outstanding Production Design for a Narrative Period Program (One Hour or More)	Jon Gary Steele, Nicki McCallum and Gina Cromwell for "Not in Scotland Anymore" and "Faith"	Nominated	
2016	BAFTA Scotland Awards	Television drama	Production Team – Tall Ship Productions, Story Mining & Supply Co., Left Bank Pictures, Sony Pictures Television/Amazon Prime Instant Video	Nominated	
2016	BAFTA Scotland Awards	Best Actor in Television	Sam Heughan	Nominated	
2016	BAFTA Scotland Awards	Best Actress in Television	Caitríona Balfe	Won	
2016	Critics' Choice Television Awards	Most Bingeworthy Series	Outlander	Won	
2016	Critics' Choice Television Awards	Best Actor in a Drama Series	Sam Heughan	Nominated	
2016	Critics' Choice Television Awards	Best Actress in a Drama Series	Caitríona Balfe	Nominated	
2016	Scottish Gaelic Awards	International Award	Àdhamh Ó Broin	Won	
2016	Hollywood Professional Association Awards	Outstanding Color Grading – Television	Steven Porter for "Faith"	Nominated	
2016	Hollywood Professional Association Awards	Outstanding Sound – Television	Nello Torri, Alan Decker, Brian Milliken, Vince Balunas for "Prestonpans"	Won	
2017	People's Choice Awards	Favorite TV Show	Outlander	Won	
2017	People's Choice Awards	Favorite Premium Sci-Fi/Fantasy Series	Outlander	Won	
2017	People's Choice Awards	Favorite Sci-Fi/Fantasy TV Actor	Sam Heughan	Won	
2017	People's Choice Awards	Favorite Sci-Fi/Fantasy TV Actress	Caitríona Balfe	Won	
2017	Globes de Cristal Award	Best Foreign Television Series	Outlander	Nominated	
2017	Satellite Awards	Best Genre Series	Outlander	Won	
2017	Satellite Awards	Best Ensemble: Television	Outlander	Won	
2017	Satellite Awards	Outstanding Blu-ray	Outlander	Won	
2017	American Society of Cinematographers	Regular Series for Non-Commercial Television	Neville Kidd for "Prestonpans"	Nominated	
2017	Golden Globe Awards	Best Actress – Television Series Drama	Caitríona Balfe	Nominated	
2017	Oscar Wilde Awards		Caitríona Balfe	Won	
2017	Women's Image Network Awards	Outstanding Drama Series	Outlander	Won	
2017	Women's Image Network Awards	Outstanding Actress in a Drama Series	Caitríona Balfe	Nominated	
2017	Women's Image Network Awards	Outstanding Show Written by a Woman	Diana Gabaldon for "Vengeance Is Mine"	Nominated	
2017	Saturn Awards	Best Fantasy Television Series	Outlander	Won	
2017	Saturn Awards	Best Actor on a Television Series	Sam Heughan	Nominated	
2017	Saturn Awards	Best Actress on a Television Series	Caitríona Balfe	Nominated	
2017	Saturn Awards	Best Guest Performance on a Television Series	Dominique Pinon	Nominated	
2017	Irish Film & Television Awards	Best Actress in a Lead Role in Drama	Caitríona Balfe	Nominated	
2017	Rockie Awards	Sci-Fi, Fantasy and Action	Outlander	Nominated	
2018	Golden Globe Awards	Best Actress – Television Series Drama	Caitríona Balfe	Nominated	
2018	16th Visual Effects Society Awards	Outstanding Supporting Visual Effects in a Photoreal Episode	Richard Briscoe, Elicia Bessette, Aladino Debert, Filip Orrby, Doug Hardy for "Eye of the Storm"	Nominated	
2018	16th Visual Effects Society Awards	Outstanding Effects Simulations in an Episode, Commercial or Real-Time Project	Jason Mortimer, Navin Pinto, Greg Teegarden, Steve Ong for "Eye of the Storm" – Stormy Seas	Nominated	
2018	Saturn Awards	Best Fantasy Television Series	Outlander	Won	
2018	Saturn Awards	Best Actor on Television	Sam Heughan	Nominated	
2018	Saturn Awards	Best Actress on Television	Caitríona Balfe	Nominated	
2019	Golden Globe Awards	Best Actress – Television Series Drama	Caitríona Balfe	Nominated	
2019	Saturn Awards	Best Fantasy Television Series	Outlander	Nominated	
2019	Saturn Awards	Best Actor on a Television Series	Sam Heughan	Won	
2019	Saturn Awards	Best Actress in a Television Series	Caitríona Balfe	Nominated	
2019	Saturn Awards	Best Supporting Actress on Television	Sophie Skelton	Nominated	
2019	Saturn Awards	Best Guest-Starring Performance on a Television Series	Ed Speleers	Nominated	
2021	Satellite Awards	Best Actress in a Drama / Genre Series	Caitríona Balfe	Nominated	
2021	Saturn Awards	Best Fantasy Television Series	Outlander	Nominated	
2021	Saturn Awards	Best Actor on a Television Series	Sam Heughan	Nominated	
2021	Saturn Awards	Best Actress on a Television Series	Caitríona Balfe	Won	
2021	Saturn Awards	Best Supporting Actor on a Television Series	Richard Rankin	Nominated	
2021	Saturn Awards	Best Supporting Actress on a Television Series	Sophie Skelton	Nominated	
2022	British Academy Scotland Awards	Best Actress in Television	Caitríona Balfe	Nominated	
2022	British Academy Scotland Awards	Audience Award	Sam Heughan	Won	
2022	British Academy Scotland Awards	Audience Award	Richard Rankin	Nominated	
2022	Saturn Awards	Best Action-Thriller Television Series: Network/Cable	Outlander	Nominated	
2022	Saturn Awards	Best Actor in a Network or Cable Television Series	Sam Heughan	Nominated	
2022	Saturn Awards	Best Actress in a Network or Cable Television Series	Caitríona Balfe	Nominated	
2022	Saturn Awards	Best Supporting Actress in a Network or Cable Television Series	Sophie Skelton	Nominated	
2023	Saturn Awards	Best Action / Adventure / Thriller Television Series	Outlander	Won	
2023	Saturn Awards	Best Actor in Television Series	Sam Heughan	Nominated	
2023	Saturn Awards	Best Actress in a Television Series	Caitríona Balfe	Won	
2023	Saturn Awards	Best Supporting Actress in a Television Series	Sophie Skelton	Nominated	
2025	Critics' Choice Super Awards	Best Actress in a Science Fiction/Fantasy Series, Limited Series or Made-for-TV Movie	Caitriona Balfe	Nominated	
2025	Critics' Choice Television Awards	Best Actress in a Drama Series	Caitríona Balfe	Nominated	

== Prequel series ==
In February 2022, it was reported that a prequel series was being developed, with Matthew B. Roberts writing and executive producing. In May 2022, executive producer Maril Davis confirmed that the series would focus on the parents of Jamie Fraser. In August 2022, it was confirmed that the prequel series will be titled Blood of My Blood. In January 2023, Starz ordered a 10-episode first season. Outlander: Blood of My Blood premiered on August 8, 2025. In June 2025, the series was renewed for a second season, ahead of the show's premiere.
