= Baragwanath =

Cornish language surname

Baragwanath is a Cornish language surname originating in west Cornwall in the UK.

== Etymology and origins ==
The meaning of bara gwaneth is "wheaten bread" (though Charnock prefers bar gwaneth, "the top of the wheat field"). It is particularly common in Penwith and is recorded as early as the year 1590.

Variants of the name are Baragwaneth, Baragwnath, and Baragwanoth.

== Spread ==
As a result of emigration, members of the Baragwanath family can now be found in South Africa, the UK and Ireland, Australia, the US, and New Zealand.

In Johannesburg, Gauteng, there is a hospital whose name is derived from a local storekeeper, John Albert Baragwanath: the Chris Hani Baragwanath Academic Hospital, Soweto. This hospital has over 3,000 beds.

In Australia, the Baragwanath Transform and the fossil plant Baragwanathia were named after the geologist William Baragwanath (died 1966).

== Notable people with the surname ==
- Judith Baragwanath (born 1951), New Zealand writer
- Minnie Baragwanath, New Zealand disability advocate
- Nicholas Baragwanath, British music theorist, musicologist and pianist
- William Baragwanath (1878–1966), Australian surveyor, geologist and public servant
- David Baragwanath, New Zealand lawyer and jurist

== References in other media ==
- The song by Australian band TISM, "Mr. Ches Baragwanath, State Auditor–General", from their controversial EP Australia the Lucky Cunt deals with the then Auditor-General of Victoria, Ches Baragwanath.
- Diana Gabaldon includes a character named Colenso Baragwanath in An Echo in the Bone and Written in My Own Heart's Blood, the seventh and eighth books in her Outlander series of novels. Baragwanath serves as orderly and groom to William Henry Ransom, Earl of Ellesmere, son of Jamie Fraser and stepson of Lord John Grey (the protagonist of her parallel Lord John series).
