= Lord John Grey (character) =

Fictional character created by Diana Gabaldon

- Outlander and Lord John series character
- David Berry as Lord John Grey (2017)
- First appearance: Novel: Dragonfly in Amber (1992); Television: Outlander; "Je Suis Prest" (2016)
- Last appearance: Television: Outlander; "Give Me Liberty" (2022)
- Created by: Diana Gabaldon
- Portrayed by: Oscar Kennedy, Outlander (2016); David Berry, Outlander (2017–present)

In-universe information
- Gender: Male
- Title: Lord
- Occupation: Officer, British Army
- Spouse: Isobel Dunsany
- Children: William Henry Ransom, Earl of Ellesmere (stepson)
- Relatives: Gerard Grey, Duke of Pardloe (father); Benedicta Grey, Duchess of Pardloe (mother); Harold Grey, Earl of Melton (brother)
- Nationality: British

Lord John William Grey is a fictional character created by Diana Gabaldon. He is a recurring secondary character in Gabaldon's Outlander series of novels, and the main character of the Lord John series of historical mystery novels and novellas. Secretly homosexual "in a time when that particular predilection could get one hanged", the character has been called "one of the most complex and interesting" of the hundreds of characters in Gabaldon's Outlander novels.

== Outlander series ==
Grey first appears in the second Outlander novel Dragonfly in Amber (1992) as a 16-year-old English soldier who chances upon Jamie and Claire Fraser on the eve of the Battle of Prestonpans. Recognizing Jamie as a wanted rebel and presuming Claire to be his prisoner, Grey attempts to save her. Using the threat of harm to Claire, Jamie tricks Grey into revealing information about the nearby British forces, and spares the boy's life.

In Voyager (1994), a mortally injured Jamie is saved from execution as a traitor after the Battle of Culloden in 1746 by Harold Grey, Earl of Melton, as repayment for sparing the younger Grey. Jamie is sent home to Lallybroch to die, but recovers, and goes into hiding. Years later in 1753 he allows himself to be caught, and is placed in Ardsmuir Prison. An adult Lord John Grey is named the new governor of the prison in 1755, and the two form an awkward friendship, which is complicated by Grey's unrequited attraction to Jamie. Grey eventually paroles Jamie at Helwater, the country estate of the Dunsany family, in 1756. Jamie secretly fathers a son with Geneva Dunsany named William, who is raised as the son of Geneva's husband, Lord Ellesmere, after Geneva and Ellesmere's deaths. Jamie decides to leave Helwater in 1764 as the boy's resemblance to him becomes increasingly apparent, and Grey becomes William's stepfather by marrying the boy's aunt and guardian, Isobel Dunsany. A grateful Jamie offers himself to Grey, who declines, but Jamie kisses him. Years later, Grey and Jamie are reunited in Jamaica, where Grey is serving as governor.

The character makes subsequent appearances in Drums of Autumn (1997), A Breath of Snow and Ashes (2005), An Echo in the Bone (2009), and Written in My Own Heart's Blood (2014), as well as in The Fiery Cross (2001) by way of a series of letters to Jamie and his family.

=== Television adaptation ===
Oscar Kennedy as a young John William Grey (2016)

Outlander, a television adaptation of Gabaldon's series, premiered on Starz in August 2014, with each season based on a novel in the sequence. The introduction of Grey in the series was confirmed by Executive Producer Ronald D. Moore in March 2015.

==== Casting ====
The casting of Oscar Kennedy in the role was announced on Twitter in November 2015. Kennedy portrays a young Grey in the 2016 season two episode "Je Suis Prest", adapting the character's appearance in Dragonfly in Amber.

In August 2016, Starz announced that David Berry had been cast as the adult Grey for season three of the series, which adapts Voyager. A photo of Berry as Grey was released in July 2017, prior to the season's debut in September 2017. He debuted in the 2017 episode "All Debts Paid", and made appearances through season five. In May 2020, Berry made a post on Twitter that many took to mean that he would not be returning to Outlander after the fifth season finale. However, it was only the character who did not return for the sixth season, and Berry did reprise the role in season seven.

==== Season two ====
In "Je Suis Prest", young John William Grey, second son of Viscount Melton, encounters Highland warrior Jamie Fraser and his wife Claire in Scotland near where his British regiment is camped. In the mistaken belief that Claire is an English prisoner of the Highlanders, Grey tries to "save" her; Jamie subdues him but spares his life. Information gleaned by Jamie from the encounter helps the Jacobites defeat the British forces at the Battle of Prestonpans.

Unlike in the novel, it is Claire who initiates the ruse of Jamie threatening her to coerce Grey. Pri Figueiredo of Moviepilot called the change "a wasted opportunity to show viewers that Jamie Fraser is more than a bulky and sensual sex toy for Claire", but Terri Schwartz of IGN wrote that "Lord John William Grey's first appearance did not disappoint, and it did a great job establishing who he is as a character without overplaying his future importance."

==== Season three ====
As in Voyager, the season three episode "All Debts Paid" finds an adult Grey as the new governor of Ardsmuir Prison, where Jamie has been incarcerated. Years later, Grey arranges for Jamie's parole at the country estate Helwater. He eventually becomes the stepfather of Jamie's illegitimate son Willie, who is being raised as an earl, in "Of Lost Things". Later in "The Bakra', Grey and Jamie are reunited in Jamaica, where Grey is governor and Jamie is seeking his missing nephew, Young Ian. Jamie is arrested in "Eye of the Storm", but Grey is able to release him due to a lack of evidence of Jamie's alleged crimes.

==== Season four ====
In the season four episode "Blood of My Blood", Grey and Willie visit Jamie and Claire in Fraser's Ridge, their homestead in North Carolina. While Jamie gets to know Willie, Claire nurses Grey, who has contracted measles. He grieves his late wife Isobel, and admits to Claire his lingering attraction to Jamie. Jamie is pained to see Grey and Willie leave. In "If Not For Hope", Grey is a dinner guest of Jamie's aunt Jocasta MacKenzie Cameron. He meets Claire and Jamie's daughter Brianna, and learns that she is unmarried and pregnant. Brianna later spies Grey having sex with another male guest, Judge Alderdyce. Knowing an unwanted suitor plans to propose, Brianna asks Grey to marry her, believing she will be safe with him. He refuses, but then relents when he realizes how much she needs him to help her.

==== Season five ====
Grey attends Brianna's wedding to Roger Mackenzie in "The Fiery Cross". He tells Jamie that Stephen Bonnet, the convicted criminal who raped Brianna, is not dead as they believed, and has been sighted in Wilmington, North Carolina. Brianna overhears. Grey later attends the wedding of Jamie's aunt, Jocasta Cameron, in "Better to Marry Than Burn". Grey visits Claire and Jamie in "Journeycake" with news that William's grandfather Lord Dunsany has died, leaving William as heir to Helwater. Grey leaves a portrait of the boy with Jamie. Grey tells Brianna he is taking Jocasta's manservant Ulysses, a former slave, with him back to England.

== Lord John series ==
Most notably, Grey is also featured in his own Lord John series of historical mystery novels and shorter works that all take place between 1756 and 1761, during the events of Voyager. When Gabaldon was invited to write a short story for the 1998 British anthology Past Poisons: An Ellis Peters Memorial Anthology of Historical Crime, she was interested in the challenge of writing a shorter work but hesitant to use any of the main characters from the Outlander series for fear of creating "a stumbling block in the growth of the next novel." The Lord Grey character came to mind.

"Lord John Grey is an important character in the Outlander series, but he isn't onstage all the time. And when he isn't...well, plainly he's off leading his life and having adventures elsewhere, and I could write about any of those adventures without causing complications for future novels. Beyond that obvious advantage, Lord John is a fascinating character. He's what I call a 'mushroom'—one of those unplanned people who pops up out of nowhere and walks off with any scene he's in—and he talks to me easily (and wittily). He's also a gay man, in a time when to be homosexual was a capital offense, and Lord John has more than most to lose by discovery. He belongs to a noble family, he's an officer in His Majesty's Army, and loves both his family and his regiment; to have his private life discovered would damage—if not destroy—both. Consequently, he lives constantly with conflict, which makes him both deeply entertaining and easy to write about."

That first Lord John story became Lord John and the Hellfire Club (1998); it was well-received and Gabaldon decided that she would write more Grey-centric tales in her spare time. Her next attempt was a larger manuscript that secured the author a deal for three full Grey novels: Lord John and the Private Matter (2003), Lord John and the Brotherhood of the Blade (2007) and The Scottish Prisoner (2011). Gabaldon would also write five additional Lord John novellas between 2003 and 2011. The Lord John spin-off series currently consists of six novellas and three novels. Though they and the main Outlander books can be understood independently of each other, according to Gabaldon there are events in each that will be more thoroughly understood having read both series. They can be generally categorized as historical mysteries, and the three novels are shorter and focus on fewer plot threads than the main Outlander books.

1. Lord John and the Hellfire Club (1998), a novella. Originally published in the 1998 British anthology Past Poisons: An Ellis Peters Memorial Anthology of Historical Crime (edited by Maxim Jakubowski), as well as by Bantam Dell as Lord John and the Hell-Fire Club in a "Complimentary Collector's Special Edition" the same year. It was later included in the Lord John and the Hand of Devils collection (2007).
2. Lord John and the Private Matter (2003), a novel. Published by Delacorte Press on September 30, 2003. Though Gabaldon had intended it to be a novella, Private Matter came in at 320 pages and secured the author a deal for two additional full Grey novels, Lord John and the Brotherhood of the Blade (2007) and The Scottish Prisoner (2011).
3. Lord John and the Succubus (2003), a novella. Originally published in the 2003 Del Rey Books anthology Legends II: New Short Novels by the Masters of Modern Fantasy (edited by Robert Silverberg), and later collected in Lord John and the Hand of Devils (2007).
4. Lord John and the Brotherhood of the Blade (2007), a novel. Published by Delacorte Press on August 28, 2007.
5. Lord John and the Haunted Soldier (2007), a novella. Published in the 2007 Delacorte Press collection Lord John and the Hand of Devils alongside previously published novellas Lord John and the Hellfire Club (1998) and Lord John and the Succubus (2003). As Haunted Soldier is a direct follow-up to her novel Lord John and the Brotherhood of the Blade, Gabaldon pushed the publication of the Hand of Devils collection until after the novel's release.
6. The Custom of the Army (2010), a novella. First published in the 2010 Tor Books fantasy anthology Warriors, edited by George R.R. Martin and Gardner Dozois. In May 2012 it became available as a standalone eBook, and was later included in A Trail of Fire, an Outlander collection released in the United Kingdom, Australia, and New Zealand in late 2012 and released in the United States and Canada in 2014. It was later collected in Seven Stones to Stand or Fall (2017).
7. The Scottish Prisoner (2011), a novel. Published by Delacorte Press on November 29, 2011.
8. Lord John and the Plague of Zombies (2011), a novella. First published in the 2011 Ace Books urban fantasy anthology Down These Strange Streets, edited by George R.R. Martin and Gardner Dozois. In April 2013 it became available as a standalone eBook titled A Plague of Zombies, and was later included in A Trail of Fire, an Outlander collection released in the United Kingdom, Australia, and New Zealand in late 2012 and expected to be released in the United States and Canada in early 2014. The novella was nominated for an Edgar Award by the Mystery Writers of America, for the “Best Short Mystery Story” of 2011.
9. Besieged (2017), a novella. Published in the 2017 Gabaldon collection Seven Stones to Stand or Fall.

With the TV series adaptation of Gabaldon's Outlander series premiering on Starz in 2014, Executive Producer Ronald D. Moore was asked in March 2015 about the possibility of a Lord John series. He said, "It's in the back of our minds as a potential thing, but right now our minds are pretty firmly set on just delivering the second season. We'll see what happens down the line on Lord Grey."

== Character overview ==
Lord John Grey himself has been called one of Gabaldon's "most complex and interesting" Outlander characters. Publishers Weekly notes Grey to be "a competent and likable sleuth" and a " soldier-hero with secrets of his own." Comfortable with his sexuality but necessarily "discreet", Grey navigates mystery and intrigue "with characteristic élan, intelligence, and fortitude, assisted by jeweled goblets of wine and meaningful glances from fetching men." Robert Silverberg wrote of the character, "A gay man in a time when that particular predilection could get one hanged, Lord John is a man accustomed to keeping secrets. He's also a man of honor and deep affections — whether returned or not." Grey is described as being about five feet six inches, slight and good-looking, with fine-boned features. He has long, blond hair and "large, beautiful" blue eyes.

=== Background ===
Born around June 1729, John William Grey is the second child of the Duke and Duchess of Pardloe, Gerard and Benedicta Grey. His brother Harold, called "Hal", is nine years older. John also has two other siblings—Paul and Edgar DeVane—half brothers from his mother's earlier marriage to Captain DeVane. When John is 12, the Duke dies in an apparent gun-inflicted suicide just as accusations surface that he may be a Jacobite. Subsequently, Harold takes the Duke's second title, Earl of Melton, to distance the family from the scandal. John continues to be called Lord John Grey, as is befitting a duke's younger son.

John's godfather had immediately enrolled him into the Beefsteak Club after his birth. He had been taught the use of a blade starting from age three, and when John was seven, his godfather had begun taking him to the Beefsteak Club every Wednesday for lunch.

=== Chronology ===
In 1745, when Grey is sixteen, he informally joins the 46th Regiment, which Hal had raised to restore the family's reputation. Grey mainly serves as a forager and a scout during this time. During the events of Dragonfly in Amber (1992), he comes across Highland warrior Jamie Fraser and his wife Claire in Scotland while exploring the hills surrounding the British campsite. In the mistaken belief that Claire is an English prisoner of the Scots, Grey tries to "save" her; Jamie breaks his arm but spares his life. Information gleaned by Jamie from the encounter leads to the Highlanders defeating the British forces at the Battle of Prestonpans in 1745.

As related later in Voyager (1993), to most of Grey's own regiment he subsequently "had been a pariah and an object of scorn." Around this time, Grey is raped by an unknown fellow soldier, but keeps silent. Grey's first lover is Hector, a twenty-year-old lieutenant in his regiment. Grey is still with the 46th Regiment at the Battle of Culloden in 1746, but is prevented from fighting by his brother Lord Melton. Hector dies in the battle. The British are victorious and the Scottish forces are slaughtered; Lord Melton spares Jamie's life in gratitude for his sparing Grey's, and allows him to flee persecution as a Jacobite rebel.

Around 1747, Grey's cousin Olivia Pearsall is orphaned, and becomes Hal's ward. She moves in with Benedicta and lives there until marriage, and Olivia and Grey become very close. At eighteen, Grey enters into a relationship with George Everett, who takes him to the Lavender House—a discreet club in London that caters to homosexual men. In 1755, a scandal involving Everett causes Grey—now a major—to be reassigned to Ardsmuir Prison in Scotland, where he serves as Governor for a year and a half. At Ardamuir, Grey is reunited with Jamie. After Culloden, Jamie had lived in hiding for seven years, but had finally turned himself in to the British forces so that the starving people at his estate of Lallybroch could collect the reward on his head. Grey and Jamie begin having weekly dinners, playing chess and exchanging information related to the prisoners. Grey falls in love with Jamie, who rejects his advances. Still, Grey cannot dismiss his feelings. In 1756, after the prison is successfully rebuilt into a fortress, Grey arranges for Jamie to be paroled to Helwater, under the eye of family friend Lord Dunsany, instead of being transported to the American colonies for seven years of indentured servitude.

In 1757 during the events of Lord John and the Private Matter (2003), Grey begins investigating Olivia's fiancé, Joseph Trevelyan, whom Grey suspects to have syphilis. During the course of his investigation, Grey visits the Lavender House and has a one-night stand with a young man there. Grey also meets and is joined in his adventure by the handsome Hanoverian Captain Stephan von Namtzen, Landgrave of Erdberg, and takes young Tom Byrd into his employ as his valet. In addition to puzzling out the Trevelyan mystery, Grey helps solve the murder of a fellow soldier who had been suspected of espionage.

In Lord John and the Succubus (2003), Grey is in Prussia serving as the English liaison officer to the First Regiment of Hanoverian Foot. Briefly stationed at the town of Gundwitz with a group of English and Hanoverian soldiers, Grey is at first skeptical when he receives reports of a local succubus victimizing a number of men and murdering a Prussian soldier. While attempting to solve the mystery, Grey tries to navigate his perhaps-mutual attraction to the dashing von Namtzen, as well as to deflect the advances of the beautiful young widow Louisa, Princess von Lowenstein, at whose castle both men are staying.

Later, in Lord John and the Brotherhood of the Blade (2007), Grey becomes romantically involved with Percy Wainwright, the stepson of General Sir George Stanley, Grey's new stepfather. The scandal of the Duke of Pardloe's death is reignited, and despite Hal's prohibitions, Grey investigates. Secretly knowing that his father had been murdered, with Jamie Fraser's help Grey finds that his father had been innocent. He is also reunited with Stephan von Namtzen, who has married Louisa. Percy is discovered in flagrante delicto with a Hanoverian soldier by Grey and two of his men. Faced with hanging for this capital crime, Percy escapes to Ireland with Grey's assistance. Percy's Hanoverian lover allows his commanding officer, von Namtzen, to kill him rather than face the shame of dismissal. Grey returns to the 46th Regiment, which is assigned to fight under Duke Ferdinand of Brunswick and chases French and Austrian troops around in the Rhine Valley for weeks until the Battle of Krefeld. During the battle, Grey takes charge of a gun crew that had lost its commander, and the cannon blows up after a few shots.

Subsequently, in Lord John and the Haunted Soldier (2007), the Royal Commission of Inquiry opens an inquiry into the circumstances surrounding the cannon explosion, and Grey is called to stand before a tribunal. He begins his own investigation as accusations threaten him and his half brother DeVane. In The Custom of the Army (2010), it is 1759 and Grey finds himself both about to be promoted within His Majesty's Army and fresh from a gentlemen's duel in which his opponent was killed. He gladly accepts an urgent summons from his old friend Charlie Carruthers, who is facing court-martial in Canada. There Grey meets and becomes romantically involved with a Native American man named Manoke.

In 1760 in The Scottish Prisoner (2011), Grey and Jamie Fraser find themselves traveling together to Ireland to try to bring back an English soldier with the intent of instigating court-martial procedures against him. During this process they manage to begin to rebuild their friendship. Grey and Stephan von Namtzen finally consummate their long-simmering attraction.

Grey later marries Isobel Dunsany, in part to take care of Jamie Fraser's illegitimate son William by Isobel's deceased sister Geneva.

In 1765 Grey, by then a lieutenant-colonel, has retired from military life and is appointed the Governor of Jamaica.

During Grey's journey to Jamaica, he meets Claire Fraser again, and is later re-acquainted with Jamie in Jamaica. Afterwards, Isobel and William go to join Grey in Jamaica, but Isobel dies during the sea voyage. At the end of his governorship, Grey takes William with him to visit Jamie at Fraser's Ridge, en route to a Virginian plantation that belongs to William. Later, Grey goes to North Carolina to visit Jocasta Cameron, Jamie's aunt, and is introduced to a very pregnant Brianna Fraser, to whom Grey is temporarily engaged so that she would not be bombarded by suitors.

While in Virginia, Grey keeps up a correspondence with the Frasers and brings for Claire several of the ingredients she needs to create ether. Grey also becomes involved again with Manoke, who takes a job at the plantation as his cook. After the American Revolutionary War breaks out, Grey goes to Philadelphia to check on the status of his nephew Henry, who had been wounded in the war. Claire, also visiting Philadelphia at the time, is able to operate on Henry and save his life. Grey and Claire then receive the (erroneously reported) news of Jamie's death, and John later marries Claire to keep her from being arrested as an American spy.

== Reception ==
In August 2016, Joanna Robinson of Vanity Fair called Grey "a character so popular, Gabaldon eventually spun him off into his own novels". Grey has been called "one of the most complex and interesting" of the hundreds of characters in Gabaldon's Outlander novels. Publishers Weekly described him as "a competent and likable sleuth" in 2003. In 2015, Fandomania named him among their "Top 10 Crushworthy LGBT Characters in Sci-Fi/Fantasy". TooFab.com called Grey a "fan favorite", noting that followers of both the book and TV series are eager for a spin-off featuring the character.
