= Saturn Award for Best Actress on Television =

Science fiction television award

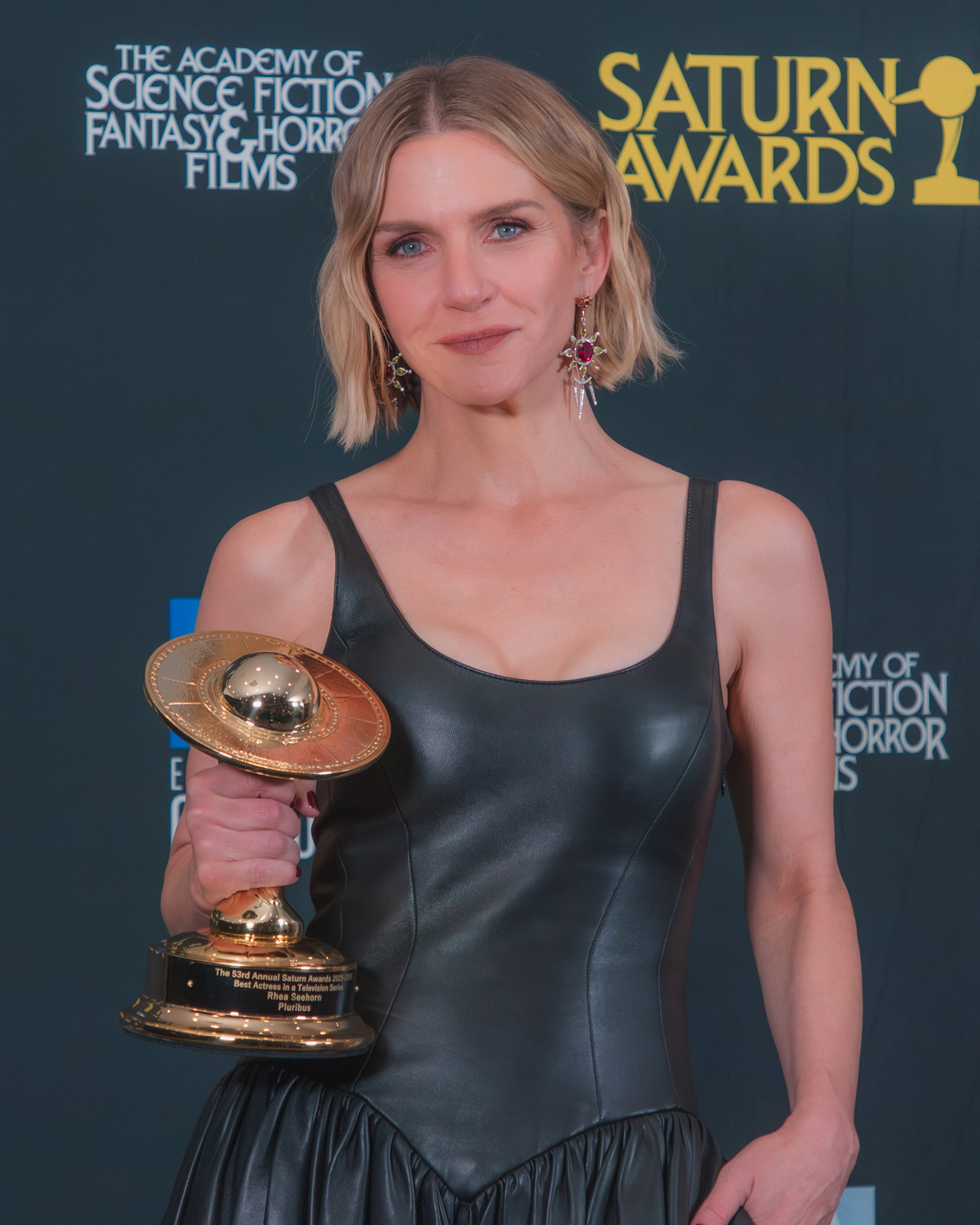
- The 2024/2025 recipient: Rhea Seehorn
- Awarded for: Best performance of the year by a female in a leading role in a genre television series
- Country: United States
- Presented by: Academy of Science Fiction, Fantasy and Horror Films
- First award: 1996
- Currently held by: Rhea Seehorn for Pluribus (2024/2025)
- Website: www.saturnawards.org

The following is a list of Saturn Award winners for Best Actress on Television. The award is presented annually by the Academy of Science Fiction, Fantasy and Horror Films, honoring the work of actresses in science fiction, fantasy, and horror fiction on television. The winners are listed in bold (NOTE: Year refers to year of eligibility, the actual ceremonies are held the following year.)

As of the 47th Saturn Awards in 2022, the award is known as Best Actress in a Network or Cable Television Series and features a sister category: Saturn Award for Best Actress in a Streaming Television Series.

== Winners and nominees ==
=== 1990s ===
Year	Actress	Television Program	Network	Character
1996 **(23rd)**	**Gillian Anderson**	**The X-Files**	**Fox**	**Dana Scully**
1996 **(23rd)**	Claudia Christian	Babylon 5	Syndicated	Susan Ivanova
1996 **(23rd)**	Melissa Joan Hart	Sabrina, The Teenage Witch	ABC	Sabrina Spellman
1996 **(23rd)**	Lucy Lawless	Xena: Warrior Princess	Syndicated	Xena
1996 **(23rd)**	Helen Shaver	Poltergeist: The Legacy	Showtime	Dr. Rachel Corrigan
1996 **(23rd)**	Megan Ward	Dark Skies	NBC	Kimberly Sayers
1997 **(24th)**	**Kate Mulgrew**	**Star Trek: Voyager**	**UPN**	**Kathryn Janeway**
1997 **(24th)**	Gillian Anderson	The X-Files	Fox	Dana Scully
1997 **(24th)**	Sarah Michelle Gellar	Buffy the Vampire Slayer	The WB	Buffy Summers
1997 **(24th)**	Jeri Ryan	Star Trek: Voyager	UPN	Seven of Nine
1997 **(24th)**	Ally Walker	Profiler	NBC	Samantha Waters
1997 **(24th)**	Peta Wilson	La Femme Nikita	USA Network	Nikita
1998 **(25th)**	**Sarah Michelle Gellar**	**Buffy the Vampire Slayer**	**The WB**	**Buffy Summers**
1998 **(25th)**	Gillian Anderson	The X-Files	Fox	Dana Scully
1998 **(25th)**	Claudia Christian	Babylon 5	TNT	Susan Ivanova
1998 **(25th)**	Shannen Doherty	Charmed	The WB	Prue Halliwell
1998 **(25th)**	Kate Mulgrew	Star Trek: Voyager	UPN	Kathryn Janeway
1998 **(25th)**	Jeri Ryan	Star Trek: Voyager	UPN	Seven of Nine
1999 **(26th)**	**Margaret Colin**	**Now and Again**	**CBS**	**Lisa Wiseman**
1999 **(26th)**	Gillian Anderson	The X-Files	Fox	Dana Scully
1999 **(26th)**	Claudia Black	Farscape	Sci-Fi	Aeryn Sun
1999 **(26th)**	Shannen Doherty	Charmed	The WB	Prue Halliwell
1999 **(26th)**	Sarah Michelle Gellar	Buffy the Vampire Slayer	The WB	Buffy Summers
1999 **(26th)**	Kate Mulgrew	Star Trek: Voyager	UPN	Kathryn Janeway

=== 2000s ===
Year	Actress	Television Program	Network	Character
2000 **(27th)**	**Jessica Alba**	**Dark Angel**	**Fox**	**Max Guevara**
2000 **(27th)**	Gillian Anderson	The X-Files	Fox	Dana Scully
2000 **(27th)**	Claudia Black	Farscape	Sci-Fi	Aeryn Sun
2000 **(27th)**	Charisma Carpenter	Angel	The WB	Cordelia Chase
2000 **(27th)**	Sarah Michelle Gellar	Buffy the Vampire Slayer	The WB	Buffy Summers
2000 **(27th)**	Kate Mulgrew	Star Trek: Voyager	UPN	Kathryn Janeway
2001 **(28th)**	**Yancy Butler**	**Witchblade**	**TNT**	**Sara Pezzini**
2001 **(28th)**	Jessica Alba	Dark Angel	Fox	Max Guevara
2001 **(28th)**	Gillian Anderson	The X-Files	Fox	Dana Scully
2001 **(28th)**	Claudia Black	Farscape	Sci-Fi	Aeryn Sun
2001 **(28th)**	Sarah Michelle Gellar	Buffy the Vampire Slayer	The WB	Buffy Summers
2001 **(28th)**	Kristin Kreuk	Smallville	The WB	Lana Lang
2002 **(29th)**	**Jennifer Garner**	**Alias**	**ABC**	**Sydney Bristow**
2002 **(29th)**	Emily Bergl	Taken	Sci-Fi	Lisa Clarke
2002 **(29th)**	Claudia Black	Farscape	Sci-Fi	Aeryn Sun
2002 **(29th)**	Charisma Carpenter	Angel	The WB	Cordelia Chase
2002 **(29th)**	Sarah Michelle Gellar	Buffy the Vampire Slayer	UPN	Buffy Summers
2002 **(29th)**	Kristin Kreuk	Smallville	The WB	Lana Lang
2003 **(30th)**	**Amber Tamblyn**	**Joan of Arcadia**	**CBS**	**Joan Girardi**
2003 **(30th)**	Eliza Dushku	Tru Calling	Fox	Tru Davies
2003 **(30th)**	Jennifer Garner	Alias	ABC	Sydney Bristow
2003 **(30th)**	Sarah Michelle Gellar	Buffy the Vampire Slayer	UPN	Buffy Summers
2003 **(30th)**	Kristin Kreuk	Smallville	The WB	Lana Lang
2003 **(30th)**	Ellen Muth	Dead Like Me	Showtime	Georgia Lass
2004 **(31st)**	**Claudia Black**	**Farscape: The Peacekeeper Wars**	**Sci-Fi**	**Aeryn Sun**
2004 **(31st)**	Kristen Bell	Veronica Mars	UPN	Veronica Mars
2004 **(31st)**	Jennifer Garner	Alias	ABC	Sydney Bristow
2004 **(31st)**	Anne Heche	The Dead Will Tell	CBS	Emily Parker
2004 **(31st)**	Evangeline Lilly	Lost	ABC	Kate Austen
2004 **(31st)**	Amber Tamblyn	Joan of Arcadia	CBS	Joan Girardi
2005 **(32nd)**	**Kristen Bell**	**Veronica Mars**	**UPN**	**Veronica Mars**
2005 **(32nd)**	Patricia Arquette	Medium	NBC	Allison DuBois
2005 **(32nd)**	Jennifer Garner	Alias	ABC	Sydney Bristow
2005 **(32nd)**	Jennifer Love Hewitt	Ghost Whisperer	CBS	Melinda Gordon
2005 **(32nd)**	Kristin Kreuk	Smallville	The WB	Lana Lang
2005 **(32nd)**	Evangeline Lilly	Lost	ABC	Kate Austen
2006 **(33rd)**	**Jennifer Love Hewitt**	**Ghost Whisperer**	**CBS**	**Melinda Gordon**
2006 **(33rd)**	Patricia Arquette	Medium	NBC	Allison DuBois
2006 **(33rd)**	Kristen Bell	Veronica Mars	The CW	Veronica Mars
2006 **(33rd)**	Evangeline Lilly	Lost	ABC	Kate Austen
2006 **(33rd)**	Katee Sackhoff	Battlestar Galactica	Sci-Fi	Kara Thrace
2006 **(33rd)**	Kyra Sedgwick	The Closer	TNT	Brenda Leigh Johnson
2007 **(34th)**	**Jennifer Love Hewitt**	**Ghost Whisperer**	**CBS**	**Melinda Gordon**
2007 **(34th)**	Anna Friel	Pushing Daisies	ABC	Charlotte Charles
2007 **(34th)**	Lena Headey	Terminator: The Sarah Connor Chronicles	Fox	Sarah Connor
2007 **(34th)**	Holly Hunter	Saving Grace	TNT	Grace Hanadarko
2007 **(34th)**	Evangeline Lilly	Lost	ABC	Kate Austen
2007 **(34th)**	Kyra Sedgwick	The Closer	TNT	Brenda Leigh Johnson
2008 **(35th)**	**Mary McDonnell**	**Battlestar Galactica**	**Sci-Fi**	**Laura Roslin**
2008 **(35th)**	Lena Headey	Terminator: The Sarah Connor Chronicles	Fox	Sarah Connor
2008 **(35th)**	Jennifer Love Hewitt	Ghost Whisperer	CBS	Melinda Gordon
2008 **(35th)**	Evangeline Lilly	Lost	ABC	Kate Austen
2008 **(35th)**	Anna Paquin	True Blood	HBO	Sookie Stackhouse
2008 **(35th)**	Kyra Sedgwick	The Closer	TNT	Brenda Leigh Johnson
2008 **(35th)**	Anna Torv	Fringe	Fox	Olivia Dunham
2009 **(36th)**	**Anna Torv**	**Fringe**	**Fox**	**Olivia Dunham**
2009 **(36th)**	Anna Gunn	Breaking Bad	AMC	Skyler White
2009 **(36th)**	Jennifer Love Hewitt	Ghost Whisperer	CBS	Melinda Gordon
2009 **(36th)**	Evangeline Lilly	Lost	ABC	Kate Austen
2009 **(36th)**	Anna Paquin	True Blood	HBO	Sookie Stackhouse
2009 **(36th)**	Kyra Sedgwick	The Closer	TNT	Brenda Leigh Johnson

=== 2010s ===
Year	Actress	Television Program	Network	Character
2010 **(37th)**	**Anna Torv**	**Fringe**	**Fox**	**Olivia Dunham**
2010 **(37th)**	Sarah Wayne Callies	The Walking Dead	AMC	Lori Grimes
2010 **(37th)**	Erica Durance	Smallville	The CW	Lois Lane
2010 **(37th)**	Elizabeth Mitchell	V	ABC	Erica Evans
2010 **(37th)**	Anna Paquin	True Blood	HBO	Sookie Stackhouse
2010 **(37th)**	Kyra Sedgwick	The Closer	TNT	Brenda Leigh Johnson
2011 **(38th)**	**Anna Torv**	**Fringe**	**Fox**	**Olivia Dunham**
2011 **(38th)**	Mireille Enos	The Killing	AMC	Sarah Linden
2011 **(38th)**	Lena Headey	Game of Thrones	HBO	Cersei Lannister
2011 **(38th)**	Jessica Lange	American Horror Story	FX	Constance Langdon
2011 **(38th)**	Eve Myles	Torchwood	Starz	Gwen Cooper
2011 **(38th)**	Kyra Sedgwick	The Closer	TNT	Brenda Leigh Johnson
2012 **(39th)**	**Anna Torv**	**Fringe**	**Fox**	**Olivia Dunham**
2012 **(39th)**	Moon Bloodgood	Falling Skies	TNT	Anne Glass
2012 **(39th)**	Mireille Enos	The Killing	AMC	Sarah Linden
2012 **(39th)**	Sarah Paulson	American Horror Story: Asylum	FX	Lana Winters
2012 **(39th)**	Charlotte Riley	World Without End	Reelz	Caris Wooler
2012 **(39th)**	Tracy Spiridakos	Revolution	NBC	Charlotte Matheson
2013 **(40th)**	**Vera Farmiga**	**Bates Motel**	**A&E**	**Norma Louise Bates**
2013 **(40th)**	Jennifer Carpenter	Dexter	Showtime	Debra Morgan
2013 **(40th)**	Anna Gunn	Breaking Bad	AMC	Skyler White
2013 **(40th)**	Jessica Lange	American Horror Story: Coven	FX	Fiona Goode
2013 **(40th)**	Rachel Nichols	Continuum	Syfy	Kiera Cameron
2013 **(40th)**	Keri Russell	The Americans	FX	Elizabeth Jennings
2014 **(41st)**	**Caitríona Balfe**	**Outlander**	**Starz**	**Claire Randall**
2014 **(41st)**	Hayley Atwell	Marvel's Agent Carter	ABC	Peggy Carter
2014 **(41st)**	Vera Farmiga	Bates Motel	A&E	Norma Louise Bates
2014 **(41st)**	Jessica Lange	American Horror Story: Freak Show	FX	Elsa Mars
2014 **(41st)**	Rachel Nichols	Continuum	Syfy	Kiera Cameron
2014 **(41st)**	Rebecca Romijn	The Librarians	TNT	Eve Baird
2015 **(42nd)**	**Caitríona Balfe**	**Outlander**	**Starz**	**Claire Randall**
2015 **(42nd)**	Gillian Anderson	The X-Files	Fox	Dana Scully
2015 **(42nd)**	Melissa Benoist	Supergirl	CBS	Kara Danvers / Supergirl
2015 **(42nd)**	Kim Dickens	Fear the Walking Dead	AMC	Madison Clark
2015 **(42nd)**	Rachel Nichols	Continuum	Syfy	Kiera Cameron
2015 **(42nd)**	Krysten Ritter	Marvel's Jessica Jones	Netflix	Jessica Jones
2015 **(42nd)**	Rebecca Romijn	The Librarians	TNT	Eve Baird
2016 **(43rd)**	**Melissa Benoist**	**Supergirl**	**The CW**	**Kara Danvers / Supergirl**
2016 **(43rd)**	Caitríona Balfe	Outlander	Starz	Claire Randall
2016 **(43rd)**	Kim Dickens	Fear the Walking Dead	AMC	Madison Clark
2016 **(43rd)**	Vera Farmiga	Bates Motel	A&E	Norma Louise Bates
2016 **(43rd)**	Lena Headey	Game of Thrones	HBO	Cersei Lannister
2016 **(43rd)**	Sarah Paulson	American Horror Story: Roanoke	FX	Audrey Tindall, Shelby Miller and Lana Winters
2016 **(43rd)**	Winona Ryder	Stranger Things	Netflix	Joyce Byers
2017 **(44th)**	**Sonequa Martin-Green**	**Star Trek: Discovery**	**CBS All Access**	**Michael Burnham**
2017 **(44th)**	Gillian Anderson	The X-Files	Fox	FBI Special Agent Dana Scully
2017 **(44th)**	Caitríona Balfe	Outlander	Starz	Claire Randall
2017 **(44th)**	Melissa Benoist	Supergirl	The CW	Kara Danvers / Supergirl
2017 **(44th)**	Lena Headey	Game of Thrones	HBO	Cersei Lannister
2017 **(44th)**	Adrianne Palicki	The Orville	Fox	Commander Kelly Grayson
2017 **(44th)**	Sarah Paulson	American Horror Story: Cult	FX	Ally Mayfair-Richards and Susan Atkins
2017 **(44th)**	Mary Elizabeth Winstead	Fargo	FX	Nikki Swango
2018/2019 **(45th)**	**Emilia Clarke**	**Game of Thrones**	**HBO**	**Daenerys Targaryen**
2018/2019 **(45th)**	Caitríona Balfe	Outlander	Starz	Claire Randall
2018/2019 **(45th)**	Melissa Benoist	Supergirl	The CW	Kara Danvers / Supergirl
2018/2019 **(45th)**	Sandra Oh	Killing Eve	BBC America	Eve Polastri
2018/2019 **(45th)**	Adrianne Palicki	The Orville	Fox	Commander Kelly Grayson
2018/2019 **(45th)**	Candice Patton	The Flash	The CW	Iris West
2018/2019 **(45th)**	Jodie Whittaker	Doctor Who	BBC America	The Doctor
2019/2020 **(46th)**	**Caitríona Balfe**	**Outlander**	**Starz**	**Claire Randall**
2019/2020 **(46th)**	Melissa Benoist	Supergirl	The CW	Kara Danvers / Supergirl
2019/2020 **(46th)**	Regina King	Watchmen	HBO	Angela Abar / Sister Night
2019/2020 **(46th)**	Sonequa Martin-Green	Star Trek: Discovery	CBS All Access	Michael Burnham
2019/2020 **(46th)**	Thandiwe Newton	Westworld	HBO	Maeve Millay
2019/2020 **(46th)**	Candice Patton	The Flash	The CW	Iris West
2019/2020 **(46th)**	Rhea Seehorn	Better Call Saul	AMC	Kim Wexler

=== 2020s ===
Year	Actor	Television Program	Network	Character
2021/2022 **(50th)**
2021/2022 **(50th)**	Network/Cable			
2021/2022 **(50th)**	**Rhea Seehorn**	**Better Call Saul**	**AMC**	**Kim Wexler**
2021/2022 **(50th)**	Caitríona Balfe	Outlander	Starz	Claire Fraser
2021/2022 **(50th)**	Kylie Bunbury	Big Sky	ABC	Cassie Dewell
2021/2022 **(50th)**	Courteney Cox	Shining Vale	Starz	Pat Phelps
2021/2022 **(50th)**	Melanie Lynskey	Yellowjackets	Showtime	Shauna
2021/2022 **(50th)**	Rose McIver	Ghosts	CBS	Samantha Arondekar
2021/2022 **(50th)**	Elizabeth Tulloch	Superman & Lois	The CW	Lois Lane
2021/2022 **(50th)**	Streaming			
2021/2022 **(50th)**	**Ming-Na Wen**	**The Book of Boba Fett**	**Disney+**	**Fennec Shand**
2021/2022 **(50th)**	Millie Bobby Brown	Stranger Things	Netflix	Eleven
2021/2022 **(50th)**	Britt Lower	Severance	Apple TV+	Helly
2021/2022 **(50th)**	Erin Moriarty	The Boys	Amazon Prime Video	Annie January
2021/2022 **(50th)**	Elizabeth Olsen	WandaVision	Disney+	Wanda Maximoff / Scarlet Witch
2021/2022 **(50th)**	Beth Riesgraf	Leverage: Redemption	Amazon Freevee	Parker
2021/2022 **(50th)**	Kate Siegel	Midnight Mass	Netflix	Erin Greene
2022/2023 **(51st)**	**Caitríona Balfe**	**Outlander**	**Starz**	**Claire Fraser**
2022/2023 **(51st)**	Lauren Cohan	The Walking Dead: Dead City	AMC	Maggie Rhee
2022/2023 **(51st)**	Emma D'Arcy	House of the Dragon	HBO	Rhaenyra Targaryen
2022/2023 **(51st)**	Rebecca Ferguson	Silo	Apple TV+	Juliette Nichols
2022/2023 **(51st)**	Tatiana Maslany	She-Hulk: Attorney at Law	Disney+	Jennifer Walters / She-Hulk
2022/2023 **(51st)**	Rose McIver	Ghosts	CBS	Samantha Arondekar
2022/2023 **(51st)**	Elizabeth Tulloch	Superman & Lois	The CW	Lois Lane
2023/2024 **(52nd)**	**Rosario Dawson**	**Ahsoka**	**Disney+**	**Ahsoka Tano**
2023/2024 **(52nd)**	Emma D'Arcy	House of the Dragon	Max	Rhaenyra Targaryen
2023/2024 **(52nd)**	Jodie Foster	True Detective: Night Country	Max	Liz Danvers
2023/2024 **(52nd)**	Danai Gurira	The Walking Dead: The Ones Who Live	AMC	Michonne
2023/2024 **(52nd)**	Kathryn Hahn	Agatha All Along	Disney+	Agatha Harkness
2023/2024 **(52nd)**	Melissa McBride	The Walking Dead: Daryl Dixon	AMC	Carol Peletier
2023/2024 **(52nd)**	Ella Purnell	Fallout	Amazon Prime Video	Lucy MacLean
2024/2025 **(53rd)**	**Rhea Seehorn**	**Pluribus**	**Apple TV+**	**Carol Sturka**
2024/2025 **(53rd)**	Caitríona Balfe	Outlander	Starz	Claire Fraser
2024/2025 **(53rd)**	Millie Bobby Brown	Stranger Things	Netflix	Eleven
2024/2025 **(53rd)**	Sydney Chandler	Alien: Earth	FX	Wendy
2024/2025 **(53rd)**	Britt Lower	Severance	Apple TV+	Helena Eagan / Helly R.
2024/2025 **(53rd)**	Melissa McBride	The Walking Dead: Daryl Dixon	AMC	Carol Peletier
2024/2025 **(53rd)**	Jenna Ortega	Wednesday	Netflix	Wednesday Addams

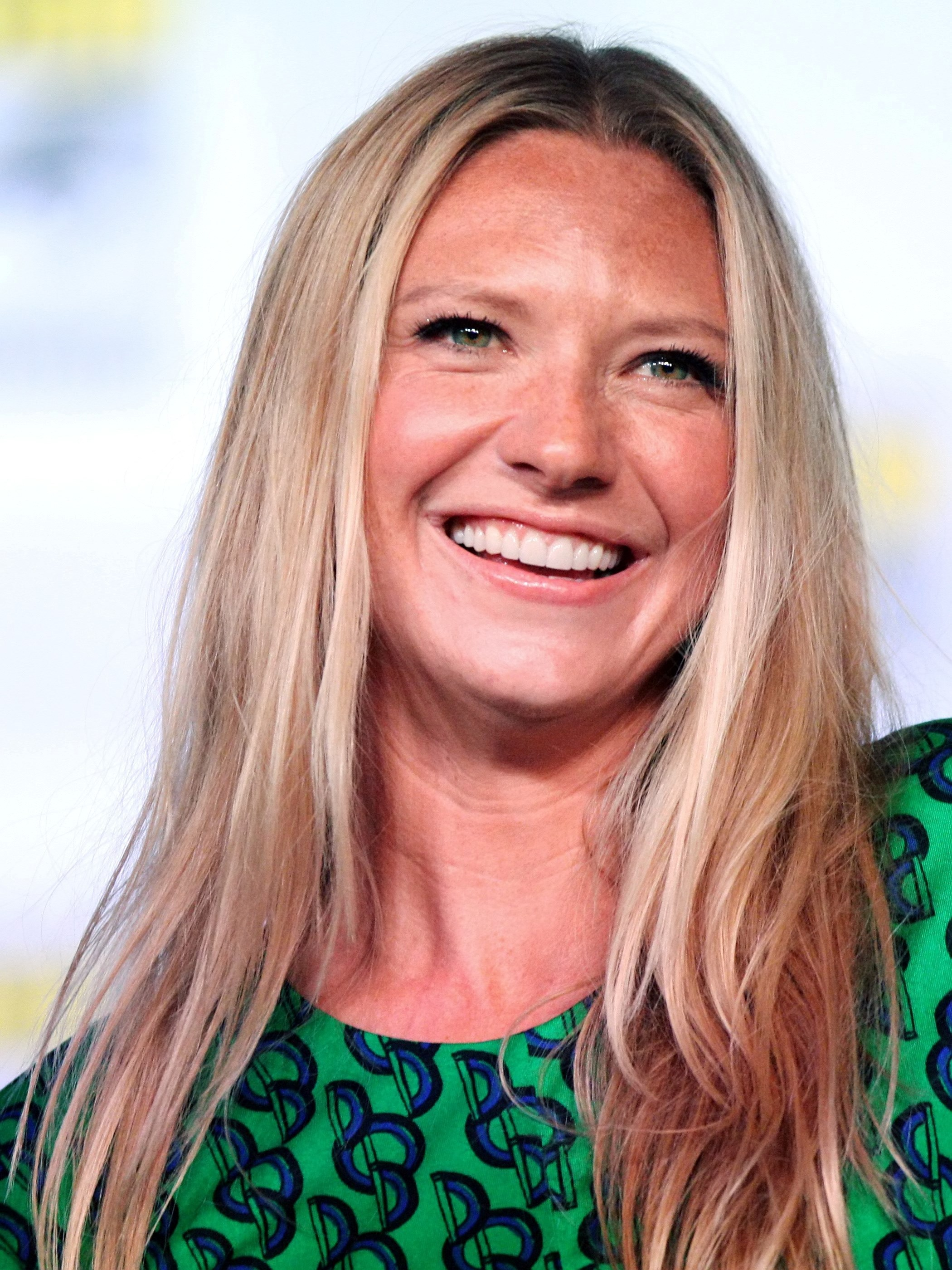
Anna Torv has won the award four times in a row, more than any other actress.

== Multiple nominations ==
8 nominations

- Gillian Anderson

7 nominations

- Caitríona Balfe
- Sarah Michelle Gellar

6 nominations

- Evangeline Lilly
- Kyra Sedgwick

5 nominations

- Melissa Benoist
- Claudia Black
- Lena Headey
- Jennifer Love Hewitt
- Anna Torv

4 nominations

- Jennifer Garner
- Kristin Kreuk
- Kate Mulgrew

3 nominations

- Kristen Bell
- Vera Farmiga
- Jessica Lange
- Rachel Nichols
- Anna Paquin
- Sarah Paulson

2 nominations

- Jessica Alba
- Patricia Arquette
- Charisma Carpenter
- Claudia Christian
- Kim Dickens
- Shannen Doherty
- Mireille Enos
- Anna Gunn
- Sonequa Martin-Green
- Adrianne Palicki
- Candice Patton
- Rebecca Romijn
- Jeri Ryan
- Rhea Seehorn
- Amber Tamblyn

== Multiple wins ==
4 wins

- Caitríona Balfe (2 consecutive)
- Anna Torv (consecutive)

2 wins

- Jennifer Love Hewitt (consecutive)
- Rhea Seehorn

== See also ==
- Saturn Award for Best Actress in Streaming Presentation
