= Claire Fraser (character) =

Fictional character in the Outlander series

- Outlander character
- Caitríona Balfe as Claire Fraser
- First appearance: Novel: Outlander (1991); Television: Outlander "Sassenach" (2014)
- Created by: Diana Gabaldon
- Portrayed by: Caitríona Balfe

In-universe information
- Full name: Claire Elizabeth Beauchamp Randall/Fraser/Grey
- Title: Lady Broch Tuarach
- Spouse: Frank Randall; Jamie Fraser; Lord John Grey (invalid)
- Children: Faith Fraser (daughter); Brianna MacKenzie (daughter); Fergus Fraser (adopted son); William Ransom (stepson)
- Relatives: Julia Beauchamp (mother); Henry Beauchamp (father); Quentin Beauchamp (paternal uncle)
- Nationality: English

Claire Fraser (Née Beauchamp, formerly Randall, temporarily Grey) is a fictional character in the Outlander series of multi-genre novels by American author Diana Gabaldon, and its television adaptation. In the series, Claire is a married World War II nurse visiting Scotland who finds herself transported from 1945 back to 1743. There, she finds adventure, war and romance with the dashing Highland warrior Jamie Fraser. Smart, stubborn, and willful, Claire uses her wits, practical medical skills, and knowledge of the future to survive in the 18th century.

Claire is portrayed by Irish actress Caitríona Balfe in the Starz television series Outlander. Balfe won a Saturn Award for Best Actress on Television in 2015 and 2016, and a People's Choice Award for Favorite Sci-Fi/Fantasy TV Actress in 2016. She also received nominations for the Golden Globe Award for Best Actress – Television Series Drama in 2015, 2016, 2017 and 2018.

== Character ==
When visiting Scotland, married World War II nurse Claire Randall is transported through time from 1945 back to 1743. There, she finds adventure, war and romance with the dashing Highland warrior Jamie Fraser. In the following novels, after the Jacobite defeat at the Battle of Culloden, Claire travels back to her time where she spends 20 years with her former husband Frank Randall, becoming a medical doctor and a surgeon, and raising her and Jamie's daughter Brianna. Finally, having discovered that Jamie survived the Battle of Culloden, she returns to 18th century Scotland and reunites with him. The couple settles in North Carolina, and is soon joined by their daughter Brianna as well as many Scottish settlers.

Gabaldon originally intended Outlander to be straight historical fiction, but after a few days of writing Claire she realized that the character did not behave like an 18th-century woman. Gabaldon eventually leaned into the modern approach to Claire, which prompted the introduction of time travel. Claire is often described as stubborn and impatient, and she refuses to conform to the 18th century societal expectations of women. Practicing medicine and putting to use her 20th century medical knowledge leads to numerous accusations of witchcraft, including a witch trial.

== Outlander novels ==
- Outlander (1991)
- Dragonfly in Amber (1992)
- Voyager (1994)
- Drums of Autumn (1997)
- The Fiery Cross (2001)
- A Breath of Snow and Ashes (2005)
- An Echo in the Bone (2009)
- Written in My Own Heart's Blood (2014)
- Go Tell the Bees That I Am Gone (2021)

== Television series ==
Claire is portrayed by Irish actress Caitríona Balfe in the Starz television series Outlander.

=== Awards and nominations ===
Balfe won a Saturn Award for Best Actress on Television in 2015 and 2016, and a People's Choice Award for Favorite Sci-Fi/Fantasy TV Actress in 2016. She also received nominations for the Golden Globe Award for Best Actress – Television Series Drama in 2016, 2017, 2018 and 2019.
