= Go Tell the Bees That I Am Gone =

2021 novel by Diana Gabaldon

- First edition cover
- Author: Diana Gabaldon
- Language: English
- Series: Outlander series
- Genre: Historical fiction Romance; Science fantasy
- Published: November 23, 2021
- Publisher: Delacorte Press
- Publication place: United States
- Media type: Print (hardcover)
- Pages: 928
- ISBN: 978-1-101-88568-0
- Preceded by: Written in My Own Heart's Blood

Go Tell the Bees That I Am Gone is the ninth book in the Outlander series of novels by Diana Gabaldon, published on November 23, 2021. Centered on time travelling 20th century doctor Claire Randall and her 18th century Scottish Highlander warrior husband Jamie Fraser, the books contain elements of historical fiction, romance, adventure and fantasy.
