= Voyager (novel) =

1993 "Outlander" novel by Diana Gabaldon

- First edition cover
- Author: Diana Gabaldon
- Language: English
- Series: Outlander series
- Genre: Historical fiction Romance; Science fantasy
- Published: December 1, 1993
- Publisher: Delacorte Press
- Publication place: United States
- Media type: Print (hardcover)
- Pages: 870
- ISBN: 978-0385302326
- Preceded by: Dragonfly in Amber
- Followed by: Drums of Autumn

Voyager (published 1993) is the third book in the Outlander series of novels by Diana Gabaldon. Centered on time travelling 20th century doctor Claire Randall and her 18th century Scottish Highlander warrior husband Jamie Fraser, the books contain elements of historical fiction, romance, adventure and fantasy.

The heroine of the bestselling Outlander (1991), Claire, returns in Voyager as a mother to Brianna Randall and living in Boston in the year 1968. The preceding novel, Dragonfly in Amber (1992), ended with Claire and Brianna coming to grips with the truth of the identity of Brianna's real father, Jamie Fraser, and Claire's travel through time. In Voyager, Claire and Brianna trace Jamie's life since the battle of Culloden during the Jacobite rising of 1745. Discovering Jamie survived the massacre that heralded the destruction of many clans in Scotland sends Claire back to the stone circle that twenty years earlier hurtled her through time.

== Plot summary ==
=== 1746 ===
Voyager opens on the battlefield at Culloden, where Jamie Fraser finds himself gravely wounded and his rival Jack Randall dead. Jamie is carried to a nearby farmhouse where 18 Jacobite soldiers have sought refuge after the battle of Culloden. Harold Grey, Earl of Melton, arrives as representative of the Duke of Cumberland and announces the survivors will be shot. As each man is led outside to be executed, Melton takes his name for the records. At Jamie's turn, Melton recognizes him as famed Jacobite “Red Jamie”, but is forbidden to execute him because Jamie spared his younger brother, Lord John Grey, during the Battle of Prestonpans, and he sends Jamie home to die of his wounds.

When government troops scour the country for Jacobite soldiers, Jamie hides in a cave near Lallybroch. He visits his sister, Jenny, and her family once a month to shave, wash, and hear news. By invoking a deed of sasine, Jamie signs Lallybroch over to Jenny’s eldest son, also called Jamie, to prevent the government from seizing their home as the property of a traitor. For a brown wool cap he wears to cover his distinctive red hair, Jamie becomes a Scottish legend, the “Dunbonnet”, and arranges to have himself be captured, whereby his tenants claim the reward and prevent famine among themselves. At Ardsmuir Prison, Jamie becomes the leader of the prisoners under the nickname "Mac Dubh". At Ardsmuir, Jamie meets Lord John Grey again as the new governor of the prison. Lord John's predecessor tells him that he invited Jamie to dinner once a week to discuss the other prisoners and suggests that Lord John continue the custom, which he does. John believes that Jamie knows the whereabouts of the French gold allegedly sent to Bonnie Prince Charlie. When the prison is fully renovated, the Crown transports the prisoners to America and uses the former prison as an army barracks; but John has Jamie sent to Helwater in the Lake District, the stud farm of Lord Dunsany, as a groom.

Dunsany has two daughters; the elder, Geneva, is infatuated with Jamie but is betrothed to Lord Ellesmere, an elderly man, and she blackmails Jamie into sexual relations with her. Geneva leaves Helwater and marries Lord Ellesmere. Nine months later, she gives birth to a boy and dies the next day. Ellesmere tells Lord Dunsany that the baby is not his, and threatens to kill him; but Jamie kills Ellesmere instead. The baby, called William, returns to Helwater with them. In reward for his actions, Lady Dunsany offers to ask Lord John to petition for a pardon so he can go home to Lallybroch. However, Jamie stays several more years at Helwater, until Willie's resemblance to himself becomes evident, whereupon he accepts the pardon.

=== 1968 ===
In the 20th century, Reverend Wakefield’s adopted son, Roger MacKenzie, offers to determine Jamie's fate. When Roger, Claire, and Claire and Jamie's daughter Brianna find evidence of Jamie writing an article printed in 1765, Claire considers returning to him, and Brianna supports her. On Halloween of 1968, Claire returns to Jamie's time.

=== 1766 ===
Claire finds Jamie in Edinburgh under the name of Alexander Malcolm, smuggling liquor in the guise of a printers' shop. His nephew, Young Ian, runs away from Lallybroch to “assist” his uncle in the business. Claire is reunited with her unofficial adopted son, Fergus, who she last knew as a 10-year-old French pickpocket, and who is now in his 30s. To explain her absence, the family tells everyone that Claire was with relatives in America, believing that Jamie was killed at Culloden, and only just learned that he was alive.

After a failed smuggling run, Jamie takes Claire and Young Ian to Lallybroch, where Claire discovers that Jamie married again and has two stepdaughters, Marsali and Joan, and that Jamie's wife is Laoghaire, who, 20 years earlier, had Claire arrested and nearly burned at the stake for witchcraft. Angry and betrayed, she leaves Lallybroch, but Young Ian brings her back, telling her that Laoghaire has shot Jamie. Upon return, Claire sees that the wound is infected and saves Jamie with antibiotics and syringes brought from the 20th century. Jamie negotiates a settlement with Laoghaire, to pay her 1,435 pounds in compensation, and to support her until she marries again. To get the money, he, Claire, and Young Ian return to the “seals’ treasure”: the Jacobite gold and jewels buried on an island not far from Ardsmuir. When they have the treasure, they plan to go to France and sell the jewels, but Young Ian is kidnapped by a strange ship. Jamie and Claire go to France, where Jamie's cousin, Jared, helps them determine the ship's identity and gives them a ship for the West Indies to rescue Ian. Laoghaire’s oldest daughter Marsali goes with them in order to marry Fergus.

At sea, their ship is hailed by the warship Porpoise, looking for a surgeon. While Claire is treating the sick, Porpoise gets under way with Claire on board, and Claire learns that the customs agent searching for Jamie is aboard Porpoise and plans to have Jamie arrested in Jamaica. Claire escapes to Hispaniola, where she is found by a naturalist studying the island's flora, Dr. Stern, and a bizarre, drunken, defrocked priest. Jamie's ship has run aground on Hispaniola following a storm, but Claire soon learns that Jamie had left them to rescue her. He is captured briefly but escapes and is reunited with Claire.

=== Jamaica ===
Disguised as a Frenchman, Jamie attends a ball for the local governor (his old friend Lord John Grey) and leaves to speak to John privately. A young woman is murdered at the ball and the guests are detained under suspicion. Claire also speaks to John and he tells her that he gave Jamie a portrait of his son, Willie, who Jamie has yet to tell her about. Jamie and Claire search for Young Ian at a slave market and later at the plantation of a Mrs. Abernathy, whom they identify as the former Geillis Duncan. After their stay with her, Jamie and Claire discover that Geillis has Ian captive. Jamie and his men plan to recover Ian, only to find that Geillis has left and taken Ian with her. Claire visits Geillis' workroom and finds a picture of Brianna nailed to the table, with suggestion of an intended sacrifice of her. After a struggle in a cave on Hispaniola, Claire kills Geillis with an axe to the neck and she and Jamie escape with Ian. As they sail away from Hispaniola on a stolen ship, they are chased by Porpoise again. In a storm, Porpoise is lost, and the stolen ship is blown off course, and shipwrecked in the American colony of Georgia.
