= An Echo in the Bone =

2009 "Outlander" novel by Diana Gabaldon

- First edition cover
- Author: Diana Gabaldon
- Language: English
- Series: Outlander series
- Genre: Historical fiction Romance; Science fantasy
- Published: September 22, 2009
- Publisher: Delacorte Press
- Publication place: United States
- Media type: Print (hardcover)
- Pages: 820
- ISBN: 978-0385342452
- Preceded by: A Breath of Snow and Ashes
- Followed by: Written in My Own Heart's Blood

An Echo in the Bone is the seventh book in the Outlander series of novels by Diana Gabaldon. Centered on time travelling 20th century doctor Claire Fraser and her 18th century Scottish Highlander warrior husband Jamie Fraser, the books contain elements of historical fiction, romance, adventure and fantasy.

First published and released in the United States on September 22, 2009, the novel continues the adventures of Claire and Jamie in the 18th century, as well as their daughter, Brianna MacKenzie and her husband, Roger MacKenzie, who returned to the 20th century at the end of the previous book, A Breath of Snow and Ashes.

== Plot summary ==
In the 20th century at Lallybroch, Brianna, Roger, Jem, and Mandy are reading letters from Claire and Jamie from the past, one of which mentions hidden gold, with a location known only to Jem. Roger's ancestor William Buchleigh "Buck" MacKenzie shows up at Lallybroch, having accidentally gone through the stones at Craigh na Dun in 1778. Given his date of death on the family record, Brianna and Roger know he is unlikely to make it safely back. Rob Cameron, one of Brianna's coworkers, kidnaps Jem, and it appears that he has taken Jem into the past. Roger and Buck travel through time to find them, "Take me to Jeremiah," Roger thinks. But Rob appears at Brianna's home and orders her to tell Jem to disclose the location of the gold. Jem is locked underground at the dam where Brianna and Rob work. He finds an electric train and starts an escape; his fate is unseen.

In the past, Lord William Ellesmere (Jamie's son who was raised as Lord John Grey's son) is involved in the American Revolution where he distinguishes himself. Arch and Mrs. (Murdina) Bug go after the gold on Fraser's Ridge. During a confused confrontation, Mrs. Bug shoots Jamie when he tells her to stop, and Young Ian shoots her. Young Ian feels guilty for killing Mrs. Bug; Arch vows to take his revenge when he has "someone worth losing." Claire, Jamie, and Ian leave their mountain home for Scotland to see Jenny, Ian the elder, and their children, and also to recover Jamie's printing press. Before they can leave America, they become involved in the Revolutionary War; Jamie accidentally shoots the hat off William's head at Saratoga. A kinsman of Jamie's on the British side, Simon Fraser of Balnain, is killed, and Jamie and Claire are asked to take his body back to Scotland. Before they leave, a stranger tries to blackmail Jamie, but Young Ian kills him. Claire, Jamie, and Young Ian leave for Scotland to bury Jamie's relative, and Young Ian leaves his dog Rollo with his friend, a Quaker woman named Rachel Hunter. Jamie, Claire, and Young Ian reach Scotland, where Ian the elder, husband to Jamie's sister Jenny and Jamie's best childhood friend, is dying of consumption. Ian and Jenny are ecstatic that Young Ian has returned, but Jenny is hostile to Claire, who is unable to cure Ian Sr. Jamie apologizes to Laoghaire (his second wife) for their separation. Laoghaire's daughter and Jamie's adopted daughter, Joan, requires Laoghaire to marry her lover (a crippled servant), so that she (Joan) can become a nun. A letter from Laoghaire's daughter Marsali reveals that her son, Henri-Christian, is very ill. In this missive, Marsali beseeches Claire's help in treating him. Claire agrees to return to America to treat Henri-Christian, stipulating that Laoghaire marry her lover, stop taking alimony from Jamie, and help Joan become a nun.

Claire saves Henri-Christian's life, with the help of Lord John, and saves Lord John's injured nephew Henry. Lord John's niece Dottie has come to America as well, in love with Rachel's brother, a Quaker physician named Denzell Hunter. Claire receives a letter from Jamie that Ian Sr. has died and Jenny has decided to leave Lallybroch. Word later arrives that Jamie has been lost at sea. Claire is about to be arrested for being a spy when Lord John insists on marrying Claire for her protection, as well as for the protection of Fergus, Marsali, and their children. Arch Bug tries to kill Rachel, but Young Ian fights him, and William kills Arch. Jamie returns alive, with Redcoats after him, and pretends to take Lord John hostage and flees; William realizes that Jamie is his father, flies into a rage, and storms out.

== Characters ==
Claire Elizabeth Beauchamp Randall Fraser - Main female character around whom the series revolves. Nurse/Physician. Born in 1918 and married in the 20th century to professor/historian Frank Randall, Claire falls through the standing stones at Craigh na Dun in Scotland at Beltane (1 May) while on a second honeymoon with Frank in 1946, and finds herself in the 18th century Scotland Highlands in 1743. She is forced to marry James Alexander Malcolm MacKenzie Fraser (Jamie), whom she eventually falls in love with. Mother of Faith (stillborn, 18th century) and Brianna, adopted mother of Fergus, and mother-in-law to Roger and Marsali. Returned through the stones to 20th century in 1746 to protect hers and Jamie's unborn child (who is then born in Boston in the 20th century). Twenty years later, after Frank Randall has died, Claire discovers (through Roger's research) that Jamie probably didn't die at Culloden, and she returns through the standing stones to 1766 to search for him.

James Alexander Malcolm MacKenzie Fraser - Laird of Lallybroch (Scotland) and Fraser's Ridge, North Carolina. Former inmate of Ardsmuir Prison. Eighteenth century husband of Claire, whom he affectionately calls "Sassenach". Father of Faith (stillborn - mother : Claire), Brianna (mother : Claire) and William Ransom (mother : Geneva Dunsany), adopted father to Fergus (with Claire).

Lord John William Grey - Retired veteran of the Rising of 1745 and Seven Years' War. The former governor of Ardsmuir Prison. Jamie and Claire's long-time friend. Stepfather of William Ransom, brother to Harold Grey, Duke of Pardloe, and uncle to Benjamin, Henry, Adam, and Dorothea Grey.

Lt. Lord William Ransom - The 9th Earl of Ellsmere, stepson of Lord John Grey, and the illegitimate son of James Fraser and Geneva Dunsany. Cousin to the children of Hal Grey, Duke of Pardloe, as well as the children of Jenny and Ian Murray.

Ian Murray (Jr.) - Jenny and Ian Murray's son, Jamie's nephew, and Fergus', Brianna's and William's cousin. Adopted into the Mohawk, but returned to the Ridge with Rollo, his half-wolf dog.

Brianna Ellen Fraser MacKenzie - Jamie and Claire's daughter born in 20th century Boston and raised by Claire and Frank Randall. Younger sister of Faith (stillborn), younger adoptive sister of Fergus, and older paternal half-sister of William. Arrives in the 18th century in 1769. She marries Roger and they have two children: a son, Jeremiah, known as "Jemmy" and a daughter, Amanda Claire MacKenzie (Mandy). Returned to the 20th century at the end of A Breath of Snow and Ashes due to baby Amanda's heart condition.

Roger MacKenzie Wakefield - One-time Oxford professor and historian, folksinger, minister and Gaelic teacher. Twentieth century descendant of Geillis Duncan and Dougal MacKenzie, Great-nephew and adopted son of Rev. Reginald Wakefield (Outlander), and Jamie and Claire's son-in-law. Arrives in the 18th century in 1769. Married to Brianna and father of Jemmy and Mandy. At the end of A Breath of Snow and Ashes, takes his family back to the 20th century to get medical help for baby Amanda's heart condition. The family then moves to live at present-day Lallybroch, the Fraser family home.

Jeremiah "Jemmy" Alexander Ian Fraser MacKenzie - Roger and Brianna's son, born in 18th century colonial North Carolina, and who, like his parents, granny Claire, and sister Amanda, can time-travel.

Amanda "Mandy" Claire Hope MacKenzie - Roger and Brianna's daughter, born in 18th century colonial North Carolina, and who, like her parents, granny Claire, and brother Jemmy, can time-travel. Her medical condition caused her parents to travel back to the future, to have it corrected. Jemmy went with them.

Fergus Claudel Fraser - Printer, one-time French pickpocket and spy. Jamie and Claire's adopted son. First appears in Dragonfly in Amber. Married to Marsali.

Marsali Fraser - Laoghaire's daughter, Jamie's stepdaughter and daughter-in-law, and Claire's daughter-in-law. First appears in Voyager. Married to Fergus and mother to Germain, Joan, Félicite, and Henri-Christian.

Henri-Christian Fraser - Fergus and Marsali's youngest son, a little person.

Janet "Jenny" Fraser Murray - The one time Lady of Lallybroch, 18th century, married to Ian Murray Sr. Older sister of James Fraser and mother of Jamie, Maggie, Katherine, Michael, Janet, and Ian.

Ian Murray, Sr - Jamie Fraser's childhood/lifetime best friend. Married to Janet "Jenny" Fraser, Jamie's beloved older sister.

Tom Christie - A former inmate of Ardsmuir Prison. Malva's and Allan's father. In love with Claire. Arrives at the Ridge at the end of Fiery Cross.

Denys Randall-Isaacs - The son of Alex Randall, adopted son of Jonathan "Black Jack" Randall, and ancestor of Frank Randall, Claire Fraser's 20th century husband.

Perseverance "Percy" Wainwright Beauchamp - English spy married into a French noble family. One-time lover (and later, stepbrother) of Lord John Grey.

Dr. Denzell Hunter - Quaker physician serving in the Revolutionary American Army.

Rachel Hunter - Quaker nurse assisting her brother serving in the Revolutionary American Army. Love interest of Ian Murray Jr.

For both Ian Murrays, Senior/Junior are not used in-character, but rather Old/Young, variants thereof, or the similar Gaelic words Mor/Og.
