= Nicholas Baragwanath =

British music theorist, musicologist and pianist

Nicholas Baragwanath is a British music theorist, musicologist and pianist. He is currently Professor of Music at the University of Nottingham. He is best known for his contributions to the compositional theory and practice of 19th-century Italian Opera. He regularly writes and presents for BBC Radio 3.

== Education ==
Baragwanath trained as a pianist at the Royal Academy of Music and, under Ryszard Bakst, at the Royal Northern College of Music. In 1998, he completed his MA and D.Phil at the University of Sussex and lectured at the University of Wellington, New Zealand. In 2001, Baragwanath moved to the Royal Northern College of Music to become Head of Postgraduate Studies and later became the Dean of Research and Enterprise. Since 2010, he has taught at the University of Nottingham.

== Research on 19th century Italian Opera and 18th century pedagogy ==
Baragwanath's research into the Italian traditions of 19th century Opera has revised opinions as to how composition was learned by composers by offering a detailed analysis of the methods of the Italian conservatories, notably in Naples and Northern Italy. These historical Italian methods of composition, grounded in solfeggio, partimento and counterpoint, offer an alternative method of analysis of Italian Opera to the standard Austro-German tradition.

Baragwanath's latest book on the solfeggio tradition provides the first major study of the fundamentals of eighteenth-century music education. It recovers an entirely forgotten art of melody that allowed musicians to develop exceptional skills in improvisation, composition, and score-reading.

== Books ==
- The Italian Traditions and Puccini: Compositional Theory and Practice in Nineteenth-Century Opera (2011). Indiana University Press.
- The Solfeggio Tradition: A Forgotten Art of Melody in the Long Eighteenth Century (2020). Oxford University Press.
- The Ocean of Sopranos: Career of a Castrato Singer, Luigi Marchesi (1754-1829) (2024). Amsterdam: Stile Galante.
- Music Theory and Analysis Special Issue: Solfeggio in the Eighteenth Century (2024). Leuven University Press.

== Awards ==
- Society for Music Theory: Outstanding Multi-Author Collection (2025) - Music Theory and Analysis Special Issue: Solfeggio in the Eighteenth Century.
- Vice-Chancellor's Medal: University of Nottingham (2018).
- Westrup Prize (2006) - Musicology and Critical Theory: The Case of Wagner, Adorno, and Horkheimer.
- Marjorie Weston Emerson Award (2014) - Mozart’s early chamber music with keyboard: traditions of performance, composition and commodification in Mozart’s Chamber Music with Keyboard, edited by Martin Harlow (Cambridge, 2012).

== See also ==
- Solfeggio
- Partimento

== Bibliography ==
- Davis, Andrew (2014), "The Italian Traditions and Puccini: Compositional Theory and Practice in Nineteenth-Century Opera", Nineteenth-Century Music Review, 11 (1), Nineteenth-Century Music Review, 11, pp 135-166: 135–141, doi:10.1017/S1479409814000019, S2CID 191782994
- Valenti, Chloe (2013), "The Italian Traditions and Puccini: Compositional Theory and Practice in Nineteenth-Century Opera by Nicholas Baragwanath (review)", Music and Letters, 94 (4), Music and Letters, Oxford University Press. 32(1), 283-290: 689–690, doi:10.1093/ml/gct113
- Gjerdingen, Robert (2013), Review: The Italian Traditions and Puccini: Compositional Theory and Practice in Nineteenth-Century Opera. (PDF), Journal of Music Theory 57:1, archived from the original (PDF) on 2016-03-05
