= Drums of Autumn =

1996 "Outlander" novel by Diana Gabaldon

- First edition cover
- Author: Diana Gabaldon
- Language: English
- Series: Outlander series
- Genre: Historical fiction Romance; Science fantasy
- Published: December 30, 1996
- Publisher: Delacorte Press
- Publication place: United States
- Media type: Print (hardcover)
- Pages: 880
- ISBN: 978-0385311403
- Preceded by: Voyager
- Followed by: The Fiery Cross

Drums of Autumn is the fourth book in the Outlander series of novels by Diana Gabaldon. Centered on time travelling 20th century doctor Claire Randall and her 18th century Scottish Highlander warrior husband Jamie Fraser, the books contain elements of historical fiction, romance, adventure, and fantasy.

The fourth season of Outlander, the TV series adaptation of Gabaldon's novels, is based on Drums of Autumn.

== Synopsis ==
The heroine of the bestselling Outlander, Claire, returns in Drums of Autumn, reunited with her husband Jamie Fraser and facing a new life in the American colonies. As the preceding novel, Voyager, concluded with Jamie Fraser and his wife Claire shipwrecked on the Georgia coastline in 1766 —and happy to be out of Scotland—Drums of Autumn picks up where Voyager left off.

== Plot ==
Jamie and Claire, as well as Fergus, Marsali, and Ian, make their way first to Charleston, and then Wilmington, before settling in the North Carolina foothills in hopes of building a homestead. Fergus' wife Marsali stayed behind on the island of Jamaica expecting the arrival of their first child. At the same time, Brianna Ellen Randall and her suitor, historian Roger Wakefield, remain safely ensconced in the 20th century. Now orphaned by her mother's departure to the past, Brianna struggles to accept her loss and satisfy her curiosity about a father she has never met, only to discover a tragic piece of "history" that threatens her parents' happiness in the past. This discovery sends Brianna back through time on a mission to save her parents that sends Roger after her.
