= Dragonfly in Amber =

1992 "Outlander" novel by Diana Gabaldon

- First edition cover
- Author: Diana Gabaldon
- Language: English
- Series: Outlander series
- Genre: Historical fiction Romance; Science fantasy
- Published: July 1, 1992
- Publisher: Delacorte Press
- Publication place: United States
- Media type: Print (hardcover)
- Pages: 752
- ISBN: 978-0385302319
- Preceded by: Outlander
- Followed by: Voyager

Dragonfly in Amber is the second book in the Outlander series of novels by Diana Gabaldon. Centered on time travelling 20th century nurse Claire Randall and her 18th century Scottish Highlander warrior husband Jamie Fraser, the books contain elements of historical fiction, romance, adventure and fantasy. This installment chronicles Claire and Jamie's efforts to prevent the Jacobite rising that Claire knows will end disastrously for the Scots.

A television adaptation of the series, called Outlander, premiered on Starz in August 2014. The show's second season—which aired May through July 2016—was based on the events of Dragonfly in Amber.

== Plot summary ==
=== Scotland, 1968 ===
Claire Randall has returned to her own time, where she has been living for 20 years with her husband Frank. Following his death, she brings her daughter, Brianna, to the home of the Randalls' old friend, Reverend Reginald Wakefield. There, Claire hopes the Reverend's adopted son, Roger, can help her discover what happened to the men of Lallybroch after the Battle of Culloden. Roger, using his Oxford credentials to obtain information, finds proof that the men of Lallybroch returned home safely. He accompanies Claire and Brianna to an old churchyard, looking for the grave of Jonathan Randall, Frank's ancestor, but also finds Jamie Fraser's gravestone: it is part of a "marriage stone", showing Claire's name but no date. Claire reveals Brianna's true paternity to her and Roger. Brianna angrily denies her mother's story, but Roger is fascinated, and Claire recounts her time after the events of Outlander.

=== Paris, 1744 ===
At the end of Outlander, Claire has convinced Jamie to stop the Jacobite rising and the subsequent slaughter. After learning that Charles Stuart is trying to get money from the French king Louis XV to fund the Jacobite cause, they travel to Paris, where Jamie uses his cousin Jared's wine business to gain the aristocratic connections necessary to plot against Stuart. A French boy named Claudel, brought up in a brothel, helps Jamie flee from some thugs, and Jamie hires him to steal the prince's correspondence, and renames him Fergus. Claire befriends an English girl named Mary Hawkins and rumors continue about Claire’s connections to witchcraft. When a group of rapists attack Mary and Claire, they are afraid of Claire and refer to her as “La Dame Blanche”. Mary Hawkins is in love with Alex Randall, the brother of Jack Randall.

When Jonathan "Black Jack" Randall arrives in Paris, Claire makes Jamie promise to spare Randall's life to protect his descendant Frank (Claire's modern-day husband). However, Jamie challenges Randall to a duel, and renders him impotent. Claire miscarries their first daughter and is taken to the hospital. Jamie is sent to the Bastille for dueling. In order to secure Jamie’s release, Claire asks the King of France, who expects that Claire will sleep with him in return. He also asks Claire to use her knowledge as “La Dame Blanche” to identify a traitor. Jamie and Claire reconcile and must return to Scotland as a part of their agreement with the King.

=== Scotland, 1745 and the Rising ===
Claire frees Jamie by an arrangement with King Louis XV of France, and they are banished from France. Back in Scotland with Fergus, they settle into farm life at his home at Lallybroch with Jamie's sister Jenny and her family. Jamie receives a letter from Charles Stuart, announcing his attempt to retake the throne of Scotland, which the prince has signed Jamie's name to, branding him a traitor to the Crown. Left with no choice, he gathers the men of Lallybroch to join the Jacobite army. Lord John Grey, a young Hanoverian scout stumbles upon Jamie and Claire. Thinking Claire a prisoner, Grey tries to "save" her, whereupon Jamie breaks the boy's arm but spares his life. Information gleaned by Jamie from this encounter helps the Jacobites win at the Battle of Prestonpans.

Charles Stuart dispatches Jamie to convince his grandfather, Lord Lovat, to send his men to join Stuart’s forces, and eventually he agrees to send troops led by his son Simon. When Jamie and Claire return to Edinburgh, then find the men of Lallybroch have been imprisoned for desertion, as the men had left for Lallybroch on Jamie’s orders. Claire visits the men in prison and tends to Alex Randall. After a skirmish and a night of hiding in a church with Jamie, Dougal MacKenzie and his men, Claire is taken by Hanoverian troops who think she is a hostage. She is taken to the Duke of Sandringham’s home where she tries to ascertain whether he is a Jacobite. After being imprisoned in her room by Sandringham, Jamie rescues Claire. They leave with Mary Hawkins, who insists on coming with them. Hugh Monroe is killed in an attempt to save Claire and Murtagh kills the Duke of Sandringham. Upon their return to Edinburgh, Mary Hawkins and Alex Randall are reunited, and before his death, Alex has Mary and Jack Randall marry. Mary is pregnant, and Claire realizes that Frank’s lineage is safe after all.

As the disastrous Battle of Culloden approaches, Jamie and Claire discuss assassinating Charles Stuart, but decide against it. Dougal MacKenzie, having overheard their conversation, accuses Claire of persuading Jamie to betray his people, and attempts to kill Claire. Dougal is stabbed by Jamie and dies in his arms. Knowing he is wanted for murder and will soon die, Jamie attempts to ensure that his nephew young Jamie will inherit Lallybroch and to send Claire back through the stones to 1946. He tells Claire he knows she is pregnant and forces Claire and the unborn Brianna to return to her own time to spare her from the battle's aftermath. Jamie returns to Culloden, intending to die in the battle.

=== 1968 ===
When Claire returned in 1946, Frank disbelieved her story but insisted on helping her raise Brianna, and asked that she would only tell Brianna the truth after his death. Upon hearing the truth, Brianna refuses to believe Claire's story. Claire enlists Roger's help by revealing him as the descendant of Dougal MacKenzie and Geillis Duncan. Claire admits to Roger that while hiding in the caves of the Highlands, plotting Jamie's escape from prison (as told in Outlander), Dougal had delivered a message from Geillis that read: "I do not know if it is possible, but I think so" and the numbers 1,9,6 and 8. Claire deduces that these signify the year 1968, and Claire and Roger suspect that Geillis was telling her the year of her own time travel. Claire, Roger, and eventually Brianna witness Geillis Duncan/Gillian Edgars' disappearance through the stone circle at Craigh na Dun after she murders her husband, Greg Edgars. Ultimately, Roger informs Claire that Jamie did not die at Culloden.

== Critical reception ==
Publishers Weekly called Dragonfly in Amber an "immensely long, compulsively readable sequel to Outlander", and noted that by "portraying life in court and hut and on the battlefield through the eyes of a strong-minded, modern participant, Gabaldon offers a fresh and offbeat historical view, framed by an intriguing contemporary issue of Claire's daughter's paternity."
