= A Breath of Snow and Ashes =

2005 "Outlander" novel by Diana Gabaldon

- Author: Diana Gabaldon
- Language: English
- Series: Outlander series
- Genre: Historical fiction Romance; Science fantasy
- Published: September 27, 2005
- Publisher: Delacorte Press
- Publication place: United States
- Media type: Print (hardcover)
- Pages: 1157
- ISBN: 978-0-385-32416-8
- OCLC: 61280307
- Dewey Decimal: 813/.54 22
- LC Class: PS3557.A22 B74 2005
- Preceded by: The Fiery Cross
- Followed by: An Echo in the Bone

A Breath of Snow and Ashes is the sixth book in the Outlander series of novels by Diana Gabaldon, published on September 27, 2005. Centered on time travelling 20th century doctor Claire Fraser and her 18th century Scottish Highlander warrior husband Jamie Fraser, the books contain elements of historical fiction, romance, adventure and fantasy.

== Plot summary ==
Claire is the wife of Jamie Fraser, her 18th century husband, and facing the politics and turmoil of the forthcoming American Revolution. The preceding novel, The Fiery Cross, concluded with political unrest in the colonies beginning to boil over and the Frasers trying to peacefully live on their isolated homestead in the foothills of North Carolina. Jamie is suddenly faced with walking between the fires of loyalty to the oath he swore to the British crown and following his hope for freedom in the new world.

== Reception ==
A Breath of Snow and Ashes debuted at #1 on The New York Times Hardcover Fiction Best-Seller List in 2005 and won the Quill Award for Science Fiction/Fantasy/Horror.
