= The Fiery Cross (novel) =

2001 "Outlander" novel by Diana Gabaldon

- Author: Diana Gabaldon
- Language: English
- Series: Outlander series
- Genre: Historical fiction Romance; Science fantasy
- Published: November 6, 2001
- Publisher: Delacorte Press
- Publication place: United States
- Media type: Print (hardcover)
- Pages: 992
- ISBN: 0-385-31527-9
- OCLC: 47666791
- Dewey Decimal: 813/.54 21
- LC Class: PS3557.A22 F54 2001
- Preceded by: Drums of Autumn
- Followed by: A Breath of Snow and Ashes

The Fiery Cross is the fifth book in the Outlander series of novels by Diana Gabaldon, published on November 6, 2001. Centered on time-travelling 20th-century doctor Claire Randall and her 18th-century Scottish Highlander warrior husband Jamie Fraser, the books contain elements of historical fiction, romance, adventure and fantasy.

== Plot summary ==
Claire, the heroine of Outlander, figures in The Fiery Cross as a reluctant oracle and wife to Jamie Fraser, her 18th-century partner, and faces the politics and turmoil of the forthcoming American Revolution. As the preceding novel, Drums of Autumn, concluded with Jamie Fraser and his wife Claire helping their daughter and new son-in-law, from the 20th century, settle into life on Fraser's Ridge, The Fiery Cross picks up the storyline exactly where it was left—with Brianna Ellen Randall Fraser and Roger Mackenzie about to make their nuptials official and baptize their son Jeremiah. With the American Revolution only a few years away and unrest brewing, Jamie is called to form a militia to put down the beginnings of rebellion in North Carolina, and risk his life for a king he knows he must betray soon. Gabaldon delivers the endings to several strands of storyline she had woven through Drums of Autumn; mysterious plots and characters are revealed and by the end, the Frasers and their family are poised on the edge of war.
