= Jamie Fraser (character) =

Fictional character in Outlander series

- Outlander and Lord John series character
- Sam Heughan as Jamie Fraser
- First appearance: Novel: Outlander (1991); Television: Outlander "Sassenach" (2014)
- Created by: Diana Gabaldon
- Portrayed by: Sam Heughan

In-universe information
- Full name: James Alexander Malcolm MacKenzie Fraser
- Aliases: Jamie MacTavish; The Dunbonnet; Red Jamie; Mac Dubh; Alexander Malcolm; Jamie Roy; Etienne Alexandre
- Nickname: Jamie
- Spouses: Claire Fraser; Laoghaire Mackenzie (annulled)
- Children: Faith Fraser (eldest daughter; stillborn); Brianna Randall (daughter); William Ransom (illegitimate son); Fergus Fraser (adopted son)
- Relatives: Janet "Jenny" Fraser Murray (sister); William “Willy” Fraser (brother)
- Religion: Roman Catholicism
- Nationality: Scottish

James "Jamie" Fraser is a fictional character in the Outlander series of multi-genre novels by American author Diana Gabaldon, and its television adaptation. In the series, married World War II nurse Claire Randall is visiting Scotland when she is transported through time from 1945 back to 1743. There she finds adventure, war and romance with the dashing Highland warrior Jamie Fraser, a grandson of Lord Lovat and senior member of Gabaldon's fictionalized Clan Fraser. Jamie Fraser also appears in two novels in the Lord John series of historical mysteries, and in the 2013 novella Virgins.

Jamie is portrayed by Sam Heughan in the Starz television series Outlander.

== Concept and creation ==
Gabaldon took the name "Jamie" from the Doctor Who character Jamie McCrimmon, portrayed in the television series by Frazer Hines. Gabaldon had seen the Doctor Who serial The War Games, which inspired her to set her novel in Scotland. Gabaldon developed Jamie from an account in the Eric Linklater book Prince in the Heather, in which a single Jacobite named Fraser survives the mass execution of his fellows. According to Gabaldon, Jamie's looks and character are based on Gabaldon's husband, Doug Watkins.

Hines guest starred in the May 2015 episode "Wentworth Prison" of Outlander, the television series adaptation of Gabaldon's novels.

== Character ==
When married World War II nurse Claire Randall is transported through time from 1945 back to 1743, she meets dashing Highland warrior Jamie Fraser.

Jeff Jensen of Entertainment Weekly wrote, "The stories the show told during the second half of the first season deepened [Claire and Jamie's] bond and their need for each other. Jamie in particular was made to confront his personal and cultural attitudes about gender roles, understand how they impact Claire, and recognize the value to him of having a wife that was his equal in every way."

Gabaldon describes Jamie as handsome and unusually tall, with distinctive red hair, deep blue eyes, and fair skin. The character uses many aliases throughout the series, including Jamie MacTavish, James, The Dunbonnet, Red Jamie/Seumas Ruadh, Mac Dubh, Alex MacKenzie, and Alexander Malcolm.

== Appearances ==
Jamie is a main character of Gabaldon's Outlander series. He also appears in two novels in the Lord John series of historical mysteries, and in the 2013 novella Virgins.

=== Outlander novels ===
- Outlander (1991)
- Dragonfly in Amber (1992)
- Voyager (1994)
- Drums of Autumn (1997)
- The Fiery Cross (2001)
- A Breath of Snow and Ashes (2005)
- An Echo in the Bone (2009)
- Written in My Own Heart's Blood (2014)
- Virgins, prequel novella in the anthology Dangerous Women (2013)
- Go Tell the Bees That I Am Gone (2021)

=== Lord John novels ===
- Lord John and the Brotherhood of the Blade (2007)
- The Scottish Prisoner (2011)

== Television series ==
Jamie is portrayed by Sam Heughan in the Starz television series Outlander.

=== Awards and nominations ===
Heughan was nominated for a Saturn Award for Best Supporting Actor on Television in 2015, and Best Actor on Television in 2016. Heughan was also nominated for a People's Choice Award for Favourite Sci-Fi/Fantasy TV Actor in 2016 and 2017, a 2016 BAFTA Scotland Award for Best Actor in Television, and a 2016 Critics' Choice Television Award for Best Actor in a Drama Series.
