= Written in My Own Heart's Blood =

2014 "Outlander" novel by Diana Gabaldon

- First edition cover
- Author: Diana Gabaldon
- Language: English
- Series: Outlander series
- Genre: Historical fiction Romance; Science fantasy
- Published: June 10, 2014
- Publisher: Delacorte Press
- Publication place: United States
- Media type: Print (hardcover)
- Pages: 825
- ISBN: 978-0-385-34443-2
- Preceded by: An Echo in the Bone
- Followed by: Go Tell the Bees That I Am Gone

Written in My Own Heart's Blood is the eighth book in the Outlander series of novels by Diana Gabaldon. Centered on time travelling 20th century doctor Claire Randall and her 18th century Scottish Highlander warrior husband Jamie Fraser, the books contain elements of historical fiction, romance, adventure and fantasy.

Published on June 10, 2014, Written in My Own Heart's Blood continues the love story of Claire and Jamie as well as the story arcs of multiple characters from the previous novel, An Echo in the Bone.

Gabaldon announced the novel's title in September 2011.

== Plot summary ==
The British evacuation of Philadelphia and the ensuing Battle of Monmouth are the major events from the book based on real history.

Claire marries John Grey for protection after Jamie is presumed lost at sea. John and Jamie fight when the details are revealed. John's stepson William is angry at finding out he's Jamie's biological son. Jamie's nephew Ian marries Rachel Hunter and her brother Denzell weds John's niece Dorothea in the same ceremony. The Hunters are Quakers and their service with the Continental Army even as noncombatants gets them ostracized by other Quakers.

Claire is wounded at Monmouth and Jamie resigns from the Continental Army to remain by her side. After spending time in Savannah, they return to Fraser's Ridge, their farm settlement in North Carolina.

The printshop and home of Jamie's adopted son Fergus burns down. Fergus's son Henri-Christian dies trying to escape the flames.

In the 20th century, Jamie and Claire's grandson Jeremiah is kidnapped (storyline of An Echo in the Bone). Their son-in-law Roger meets Jamie's father and his own when time traveling to find Jeremiah. After the boy is recovered, his family joins the Frasers in the 18th century.

== Characters ==
Claire Elizabeth Beauchamp Randall Fraser - Main character around whom the series revolves. Nurse/Physician. Born in 1918 and married in the 20th century to professor/historian Frank Randall, Claire falls through the standing stones at Craigh na Dun in Scotland at Beltane (1 May) while on a second honeymoon with Frank in 1946, and finds herself in the 18th century Scotland Highlands in 1743. She is forced to marry James Alexander Malcolm MacKenzie Fraser (Jamie), with whom she eventually falls in love. Mother of Faith (stillborn, 18th century) and Brianna, adoptive mother of Fergus, and mother-in-law to Marsali. Returned through the stones to 20th century in 1746 to protect her and Jamie's unborn child (who is then born in Boston in the 20th century). Twenty years later, after Frank Randall has died, Claire discovers (through Roger's research) that Jamie probably didn't die at Culloden, and she returns through the standing stones to 1766 to search for him.

James Alexander Malcolm MacKenzie Fraser - Laird of Lallybroch (Scotland) and Fraser's Ridge, North Carolina. Former inmate of Ardsmuir Prison. Eighteenth century husband of Claire, whom he affectionately calls "Sassenach". Father of Faith (stillborn - mother: Claire), Brianna (mother: Claire), adoptive father to Fergus (with Claire), biological father of William Ransom (mother: Geneva Dunsany), ex-stepfather to Marsali and Joan (mother: ex-wife Laoghaire), .

Lord John William Grey - Retired veteran of the Rising of 1745 and Seven Years' War. The former governor of Ardsmuir Prison. Jamie and Claire's long time friend. Stepfather of William Ransom, brother to Harold Grey, Duke of Pardloe, and uncle to Benjamin, Henry, Adam, and Dorothea Grey.

Lt. Lord William Ransom - The 9th Earl of Ellsmere, stepson of Lord John Grey, and the illegitimate son of James Fraser and Geneva Dunsany. Cousin to the children of Hal Grey, Duke of Pardloe, as well as the children of Jenny and Ian Murray.

Ian Murray ("Young" or equivalent like the Gaelic "Og" used to distinguish from his father of the same name) - Jenny and Ian Murray's son, Jamie and Claire's nephew, and Fergus', Brianna's and William's cousin. Adopted into the Mohawk, but returned to the Ridge with Rollo, his half-wolf dog.

Brianna Ellen MacKenzie - Jamie and Claire's daughter born in 20th century Boston and raised by Claire and Frank Randall. Arrives in the 18th century in 1769. She marries Roger and they have two children: a son, Jeremiah, known as "Jemmy" and a daughter, Amanda Claire Hope MacKenzie (Mandy).

Roger MacKenzie - One-time Oxford professor and historian, folksinger, minister and Gaelic teacher. Twentieth century descendant of Geillis Duncan and Dougal MacKenzie, great-nephew and adopted son of Rev. Reginald Wakefield (Outlander), and Jamie and Claire's son-in-law. Arrives in the 18th century in 1769. Married to Brianna and father of Jemmy and Mandy. The family lives at present-day Lallybroch, the Fraser family home.

Jeremiah Alexander Ian Fraser MacKenzie - Roger and Brianna's son, born in 18th century colonial North Carolina, who like his parents, granny Claire and sister Amanda, can time travel.

Fergus Claudel Fraser - Printer, one-time French pickpocket and spy. Jamie and Claire's adopted son. First appears in Dragonfly in Amber. Married to Marsali and father to Germaine, Joan, Félicite, and Henri-Christian.

Marsali Fraser - Laoghaire's daughter, Jamie's stepdaughter and daughter-in-law, and Claire's daughter-in-law. First appears in Voyager. Married to Fergus and mother to Germain, Joan, Félicité, and Henri-Christian.

Henri-Christian Fraser - Fergus and Marsali's youngest son, a little person.

Janet "Jenny" Fraser Murray - The one time Lady of Lallybroch, 18th century, married to Ian Murray Sr. Older sister of James Fraser and mother of Jamie, Maggie, Katherine, Michael, Janet, and Ian.

Denys Randall-Isaacs - The son of Alex Randall, putative son of Jonathan "Black Jack" Randall, and ancestor of Frank Randall, Claire Fraser's 20th century husband.

Perseverance "Percy" Wainwright Beauchamp - English spy married into a French noble family. One-time lover (and later, stepbrother) of Lord John Grey.

Dr. Denzell Hunter - Quaker physician serving in the Revolutionary American Army.

Rachel Hunter - Quaker nurse assisting her brother serving in the Revolutionary American Army. Love interest of Young Ian Murray.

Rob Cameron - Colleague of Brianna's at the North of Scotland Hydro-Electric Board
