= List of TV Guide covers (2020s) =

The following is a list of issue covers of TV Guide magazine from the decade of the 2020s, with dates from January 2020 to the present day. This list reflects only the regular bi-weekly issues of TV Guide (no one-time special issues). The entries on this table include each cover's subjects and their artists (photographer or illustrator).

== 2020 ==
Issue start	Issue end	Cover subject	Cover type (credit)
2020-01-06	2020-01-19	Caitriona Balfe and Sam Heughan of Outlander	Photograph
2020-01-20	2020-02-02	Patrick Stewart of Star Trek: Picard	Photograph
2020-02-03	2020-02-16	Scott Bakula of NCIS: New Orleans	Photograph
2020-02-17	2020-03-01	Laurie Metcalf, John Goodman, and Sara Gilbert of The Conners	Photograph
2020-03-02	2020-03-17	Spring Preview	Photo montage
2020-03-18	2020-03-29	Milo Ventimiglia and Mandy Moore of This Is Us	Photograph
2020-03-30	2020-04-12	Pauley Perrette of Broke	Photograph
2020-04-13	2020-04-26	LL Cool J, Chris O’Donnell, and Linda Hunt (inset) of NCIS: Los Angeles	Photograph
2020-04-27	2020-05-10	Catherine Bell and James Denton of Good Witch	Photograph
2020-05-11	2020-05-24	Angela Bassett and Peter Krause of 9-1-1	Photograph
2020-05-25	2020-06-07	Steve Carell, John Malkovich, and Lisa Kudrow of Space Force	Photograph
2020-06-08	2020-06-21	Matthew Rhys of Perry Mason	Photograph
2020-06-22	2020-07-05	Mark Harmon of NCIS	Photograph
2020-07-06	2020-07-19	Rocsi Diaz and The Miz of Cannonball	Photograph
2020-07-20	2020-08-02	Valerie Bertinelli of Valerie's Home Cooking	Photograph
2020-08-03	2020-08-16	"Your Fan Favorites" issue	Photo Montage
2020-08-17	2020-08-30	Soap operas return to production (4 issues); *Denise Richards, Thorsten Kaye, and Katherine Kelly Lang of The Bold and the Beautiful; *Deidre Hall and Drake Hogestyn of Days of Our Lives; *Maurice Benard and Laura Wright of General Hospital; *Eric Braeden and Melody Thomas Scott of The Young and the Restless	Photograph
2020-08-31	2020-09-13	2020 NFL season (2 issues); *Tom Brady of the Tampa Bay Buccaneers; *Patrick Mahomes of the Kansas City Chiefs	Photograph
2020-09-14	2020-09-27	"Fall Sneak Peek" issue	Photo montage
2020-09-28	2020-10-11	"The 68th Annual Fall Preview"	Word art
2020-10-12	2020-10-25	Michael Weatherly of Bull	Photograph
2020-10-26	2020-11-08	Mark Harmon and David McCallum of NCIS	Photograph
2020-11-09	2020-11-22	The cast of Supernatural on the occasion of the series' finale	Illustration
2020-11-23	2020-12-06	Hallmark Channel's "Countdown to Christmas 2020" (4 covers); *Ana Ayora and Robert Buckley of The Christmas House; *Lacey Chabert and Will Kemp of The Christmas Waltz; *Adrian Holmes and Holly Robinson Peete of The Christmas Doctor; *Tamera Mowry-Housley and Michael Xavier of Christmas Comes Twice	Photograph
2020-12-07	2020-12-20	Tom Selleck of Blue Bloods	Photograph
2020-12-21	2021-01-03	Mayim Bialik of Call Me Kat	Photograph

== 2021 ==
Issue start	Issue end	Cover subject	Cover type (credit)
2021-01-04	2021-01-17	Holly Hunter and Ted Danson of Mr. Mayor	Photograph
2021-01-18	2021-01-31	Jared Padalecki of Walker	Photograph
2021-02-01	2021-02-14	Sam Heughan of Men in Kilts	Photograph
2021-02-15	2021-02-28	Chris McNally, Erin Krakow, and Kevin McGarry of When Calls the Heart	Photograph
2021-03-01	2021-03-14	Jonathan Tucker and Riann Steele of Debris	Photograph
2021-03-15	2021-03-28	"TV's True Crime Craze!"	Photo Montage
2021-03-29	2021-04-11	Christopher Meloni of Law & Order: Organized Crime	Photograph
2021-04-12	2021-04-25	"Secrets of WWE Legends"	Photo Montage
2021-04-26	2021-05-09	Supergirl (2 covers); *Melissa Benoist; *Benoist with Chyler Leigh	Photograph
2021-05-10	2021-05-23	Scott Bakula and Chelsea Field of NCIS: New Orleans, on the occasion of the series' finale	Photograph
2021-05-24	2021-06-06	"Summer Preview," featuring Zooey Deschanel and Michael Bolton of The Celebrity Dating Game	Photograph
2021-06-07	2021-06-20	"Sci-Fi Spectacular," featuring Tom Hiddleston of Loki	Photograph
2021-06-21	2021-07-04	"First Look at Fall TV," featuring Mariska Hargitay of Law & Order: Special Victims Unit, Mark Harmon of NCIS, Missy Peregrym of FBI, and William Petersen of CSI: Vegas	Photo Montage
2021-07-05	2021-07-18	A preview of Discovery Channel's "Shark Week"	Photograph
2021-07-19	2021-08-01	A preview of the Tokyo Olympics, featuring Team USA athletes Simone Biles, Carli Lloyd, Caeleb Dressel, and Allyson Felix	Photo Montage
2015-08-02	2021-08-15	Meghan Ory, Robert Buckley, and Treat Williams of Chesapeake Shores	Photograph
2021-08-16	2021-08-29	"Fall Sneak Peek," featuring Vanessa Lachey of NCIS: Hawaii	Photograph
2021-08-30	2021-09-12	"Fall TV Preview," featuring Jorja Fox and William Petersen of CSI: Vegas	Photograph
2021-09-13	2021-09-26	"Returning Favorites" issue, featuring Mariska Hargitay of Law & Order: Special Victims Unit and Christopher Meloni of Law & Order: Organized Crime	Photo Montage
2021-09-27	2021-10-10	The Sopranos star James Gandolfini and, in inset, Michael Gandolfini of Sopranos prequel film The Many Saints of Newark	Photograph
2021-10-11	2021-10-24	Kate Walsh, on the occasion of her return to Grey's Anatomy	Photograph
2021-10-25	2021-11-07	Barry Watson and Jill Scott of Lifetime's Highway to Heaven movie reboot (original Highway star Michael Landon appears in an inset)	Photograph
2021-11-08	2021-11-21	"Hallmark Kicks Off the Holidays" (3 covers); *Will Adams and Olivia Washington of A Holiday in Harlem; *Teri Hatcher and James Denton of A Kiss Before Christmas; *Jordin Sparks and Michael Xavier of A Christmas Treasure	Photograph
2021-11-22	2021-12-05	*Michael C. Hall of Dexter: New Blood; *The Beatles of the documentary Get Back (flipside bonus cover)	Hall: Photograph; Beatles: Photo Montage
2021-12-06	2021-12-19	"Lifetime's Christmas Gift," featuring Melissa Joan Hart, Mario Lopez, and Jana Kramer	Photo Montage
2021-12-20	2021-01-02	Temuera Morrison and Ming-Na Wen of The Book of Boba Fett	Photograph

== 2022 ==
Issue start	Issue end	Cover subject	Cover type (credit)
2022-01-03	2022-01-16	Cole Hauser and Kelly Reilly of Yellowstone	Photograph
2022-01-17	2022-01-30	"2022 Preview: The Shows We Can't Wait to See"	Photo Montage
2022-01-31	2022-02-13	A tribute to Bob Saget	Photograph
2022-02-14	2022-02-27	Camryn Manheim, Sam Waterston, and Anthony Anderson of the revived Law & Order	Photograph
2022-02-28	2022-03-13	Caitriona Balfe and Sam Heughan of Outlander	Photograph
2022-03-14	2022-03-27	Tom Selleck, Bridget Moynahan, Donnie Wahlberg, and Will Estes of Blue Bloods	Photograph
2022-03-28	2022-04-10	Anthony Anderson and Tracee Ellis Ross of Black-ish	Photograph
2022-04-11	2022-04-24	"The Hot List," featuring Alan Ritchson of Reacher	Photograph
2022-04-25	2022-05-08	Ken Jennings of Jeopardy!	Photograph
2022-05-09	2022-05-22	Katrina Law, Sean Murray, Gary Cole, and Wilmer Valderrama of NCIS	Photograph
2022-05-23	2022-06-12	Jensen Ackles of The Boys (TV Guide's first three-week "triple issue")	Photograph
2022-06-13	2022-07-03	Kelly Reilly and, in insets, Kevin Costner and Cole Hauser of Yellowstone	Photograph
2022-07-04	2022-07-24	"First Look at Fall TV," featuring Sylvester Stallone of Tulsa King	Photograph
2022-07-25	2022-08-14	"Summer TV How-To Guide"; Inset: "24 Hours of Elvis Presley on TCM"	Photograph
2022-08-15	2022-08-28	Matt Smith of House of the Dragon	Photograph
2022-08-29	2022-09-11	"70th Annual Fall Preview," featuring Ismael Cruz Córdova, Morfydd Clark, and Robert Aramayo of The Lord of the Rings: The Rings of Power	Photograph
2022-09-12	2022-09-25	Caitlin Bassett, Raymond Lee, and Ernie Hudson of Quantum Leap	Photograph
2022-09-26	2022-10-09	Tom Selleck and Bridget Moynahan of Blue Bloods	Photograph
2022-10-10	10/23/202	Actors Meg Donnelly & Drake Rodger and (in inset) executive producer Jensen Ackles of The Winchesters	Photograph
2022-10-24	2022-11-06	Brandon Scott Jones, Utkarsh Ambudkar, Rose McIver, and Rebecca Wisocky of Ghosts	Photograph
2022-11-07	2022-11-20	Wes Bentley, Kevin Costner, and Kelly Reilly of Yellowstone	Photograph
2022-11-21	2022-12-04	"Holiday Preview," spotlighting Hallmark Channel's newest seasonal films (4 covers); *Lacey Chabert and Wes Brown of Haul Out the Holly; *Shannon Chan-Kent and Shannon Kook of A Big Fat Family Christmas; *Nikki DeLoach and Brennan Elliott of The Gift of Peace; *Nadine Ellis, B. J. Britt, and Tamala Jones of The Holiday Stocking	Photograph
2022-12-05	2022-12-18	Kirsten Vangsness, Joe Mantegna, and A. J. Cook of Criminal Minds: Evolution	Photograph
2022-12-19	2023-01-01	John Krasinski of Jack Ryan	Photograph

== 2023 ==
Issue start	Issue end	Cover subject	Cover type (credit)
2023-01-02	2023-01-15	Reba McEntire of Big Sky	Photograph
2023-01-16	2023-01-29	John Larroquette and Melissa Rauch of Night Court	Photograph
2023-01-30	2023-02-12	Max Thieriot and (in inset) Jordan Calloway and Stephanie Arcila of Fire Country	Photograph
2023-02-13	2023-02-26	Perdita Weeks and Jay Hernandez of Magnum P.I.	Photograph
2023-02-27	2023-03-12	The cast of NCIS	Photo montage
2023-03-13	2023-03-26	Beau Mirchoff, Nancy Travis, and Tiera Skovbye of Ride	Photograph
2023-03-27	2023-04-09	The 60th anniversary of General Hospital	Photo montage
2023-04-10	2023-04-23	Donnie Wahlberg of Blue Bloods	Photograph
2023-04-24	2023-05-07	Troy Gentile, Sam Lerner, Hayley Orrantia, Wendi McLendon-Covey, Sean Giambrone, and Bentley the dog of The Goldbergs	Photograph
2023-05-08	2023-05-21	The cast of NCIS: Los Angeles	Photo montage
2023-05-22	2023-06-11	Sadie Stanley and Lexi Underwood of Cruel Summer	Photograph
2023-06-12	2023-07-02	Sam Heughan and Caitríona Balfe of Outlander	Photograph
2023-07-03	2023-07-23	Timothy Olyphant of Justified: City Primeval	Photograph
2023-07-24	2023-08-13	Jonathan Roumie of The Chosen	Photograph
2023-08-14	2023-09-03	Elvis Presley, subject of the Paramount+ documentary Reinventing Elvis: The '68 Comeback	Photograph
2023-09-04	2023-09-24	"Fall Preview," featuring Jesse L. Martin of The Irrational	Photograph
2023-09-25	2023-10-15	Gerry Turner of The Golden Bachelor	Photograph
2023-10-16	2023-11-05	Kelsey Grammer of Frasier	Photograph
2023-11-06	2023-11-26	Hallmark Channel's holiday film preview (4 covers); *Lacey Chabert and Scott Wolf of A Merry Scottish Christmas; *Aias Dalman, Lucas Bryant, and Nikki DeLoach of A World Record Christmas; *Richard Harmon, Krystal Joy Brown, Juan Riedinger, and Tina Lifford of Heaven Down Here; *Kristoffer Polaha and Bethany Joy Lenz of A Biltmore Christmas	Photograph
2023-11-27	2023-12-17	Olivia Swann and Todd Lasance of NCIS: Sydney	Photograph
2023-12-18	2024-01-07	Abigail Spencer, Jon Cryer, and Donald Faison of Extended Family	Photograph

== 2024 ==
Issue start	Issue end	Cover subject	Cover type (credit)
2024-01-08	2024-01-28	Sam Heughan of Outlander and The Couple Next Door	Photograph
2024-01-29	2024-02-18	Tom Selleck and Will Estes of Blue Bloods	Photograph
2024-02-19	2024-03-10	Hiroyuki Sanada of Shōgun	Photograph
2024-03-11	2024-03-31	Tony Goldwyn of Law & Order	Photograph
2024-04-01	2024-04-21	Giancarlo Esposito of Parish	Photograph
2024-04-22	2024-05-12	Justin Hartley of Tracker	Photograph
2024-05-13	2024-06-02	Iain Armitage of Young Sheldon	Photograph
2024-06-03	2024-06-23	Pat Sajak of Wheel of Fortune	Photograph
2024-06-24	2024-07-14	"First Look at Fall TV," featuring Kaitlin Olson of High Potential	Photograph
2024-07-15	2024-08-04	Bugs Bunny, on the occasion of a MeTV Toons special celebrating the Warner Bros. character's 84th birthday	Illustration
2024-08-05	2024-08-25	Adam Demos, Arielle Kebbel, Kekoa Kekumano of Rescue: HI-Surf	Photograph
2024-08-26	2024-09-15	"Fall Preview," featuring Don Johnson and Joshua Jackson of Doctor Odyssey	Photograph
2024-09-16	2024-10-06	"Returning Favorites" issue, featuring Joan Vassos of The Golden Bachelorette	Photograph
2024-10-07	2024-10-27	The final episodes of Blue Bloods (4 covers); *Will Estes and Vanessa Ray; *Bridget Moynahan; *Tom Selleck and Len Cariou; *Donnie Wahlberg and Marisa Ramirez	Photograph
2024-10-28	2024-11-17	Allison Tolman, David Alan Grier, and Wendi McLendon-Covey of St. Denis Medical	Photograph
2024-11-18	2024-12-08	Hallmark Channel's Christmas films (4 covers); *Paul Campbell, Andrew Walker, Miles Marthaller, and Tyler Hynes of Three Wiser Men and a Boy; *Hynes and Hunter King of Holiday Touchdown: A Chiefs Love Story; *Ser'Darius Blain and Sara Canning of Christmas on Call; *Maggie Lawson and Janel Parrish of Sugarplummed	Photograph
2024-12-09	2024-12-29	Caitríona Balfe and Sam Heughan of Outlander	Photograph
2024-12-30	2025-01-19	Tim Allen and Kat Dennings of Shifting Gears	Photograph

== 2025 ==
Issue start	Issue end	Cover subject	Cover type (credit)
2025-01-	2025-02-09	"Winter Preview," featuring Melissa Roxburgh of The Hunting Party	Photograph
2025-02-10	2025-03-02	Josh McDermitt, Lex Scott Davis, Stephen Amell, and Bryan Greenberg of Suits LA	Photograph
2025-03-03	2025-03-23	Ryan Seacrest, Carrie Underwood, Lionel Richie, and Luke Bryan of American Idol; Asif Ali, Poorna Jagannathan, and Saagar Shaikh of Deli Boys (streaming flipside cover)	Photograph
2025-03-24	2025-04-13	Madison Lintz, Titus Welliver, and Mimi Rogers of Bosch; Matt Bomer, Nathan Lane, Nathan Lee Graham, and the late Linda Lavin of Mid-Century Modern (streaming flipside cover)	Photograph
2025-04-14	2025-05-04	Sheryl Lee Ralph and Quinta Brunson of Abbott Elementary; Christopher Meloni of Law & Order: Organized Crime (streaming flipside cover)	Photograph
2025-05-05	2025-05-25	"Nostalgia TV" issue, featuring Ronny Howard and Andy Griffith of The Andy Griffith Show on MeTV; Josh Holloway and Rachel Hilson of Duster (streaming flipside cover)	Photograph
2025-05-26	2025-06-15	Sofía Vergara, Terry Crews, Simon Cowell, Howie Mandel, and Mel B of America's Got Talent; Jeffrey Dean Morgan of Destination X (flipside cover)	Photograph
2025-06-16	2025-07-06	Gordon Ramsay of Gordon Ramsay's Secret Service; Jessica Camacho and Jensen Ackles of Countdown (streaming flipside cover)	Photograph
2025-07-07	2025-07-27	"Let the Games Begin!" featuring hosts Martin Short of Match Game and, in insets, Steve Harvey of Celebrity Family Feud and Elizabeth Banks of Press Your Luck; Ernest Kinglsey, Jr. and Sterling K. Brown of Washington Black (streaming flipside cover)	Photograph
2025-07-28	2025-08-17	Cote de Pablo and Michael Weatherly of NCIS: Tony & Ziva; Alicia Silverstone of Irish Blood (streaming flipside cover)	Photograph
2025-08-18	2025-09-07	"Fall Sneak Peek," featuring Jessica Capshaw and Chris O'Donnell of 9-1-1: Nashville; Chris Hemsworth of Limitless (streaming flipside cover)	Photograph
2025-09-08	2025-09-28	"Fall Preview," featuring Bozoma Saint John and Jimmy Fallon of On Brand with Jimmy Fallon; Zachary Quinto of Brilliant Minds (streaming flipside cover)	Photograph
2025-09-29	2025-10-19	Jason Beghe of Chicago P.D., Taylor Kinney of Chicago Fire, and S. Epatha Merkerson of Chicago Med; Reid Scott, Maura Tierney, Tony Goldwyn, Odelya Halevi, and Hugh Dancy of Law & Order (streaming flipside cover)	Photograph
2025-10-20	2025-11-09	Molly Parker and Felicity Huffman of Doc; Joseph Sikora, Emayatzy Corinealdi, and McKinley Freeman of Reasonable Doubt (streaming flipside cover)	Photograph
2025-11-10	2025-11-30	A preview of Hallmark Channel's holiday programming *Sarah Drew and Peter Mooney of Mistletoe Murders; *Tamera Mowry-Housley of Baked With Love: Holiday; *Holland Roden and Matthew Daddario of Holiday Touchdown: A Bills Love Story; *Andrew Walker and Lacey Chabert of She's Making a List	Photograph
2025-12-01	2025-12-21	"A Classic Christmas," promoting FETV's lineup of classic holiday TV episodes Siân Brooke and Katherine Devlin of Blue Lights (streaming flipside cover)	Photograph
2025-12-22	2026-01-11	Melissa Roxburgh of The Hunting Party; Tenika Davis, Nick E. Tarabay, and Graham McTavish of Spartacus: House of Ashur (streaming flipside cover)	Photograph (Roxburgh: Lindsay Siu/NBC; Spartacus: James Dimmock/Starz Entertainment)

== 2026 ==
Issue start	Issue end	Cover subject	Cover type (credit)
2026-01-12	2026-02-01	Annie Potts, Josh Charles, and Abigail Spencer of Best Medicine; Stephen Graham, Erin Doherty, and Malachi Kirby of A Thousand Blows (streaming flipside cover)	Photograph
2026-02-02	2026-02-22	Zahn McClarnon of Dark Winds; Aldis Hodge and Isaiah Mustafa of Cross (streaming flipside cover)	Photograph
2026-02-23	2026-03-14	Bobby Moynihan, Daniel Radcliffe, Tracy Morgan, and Erika Alexander of The Fall and Rise of Reggie Dinkins; Adam Levine, Kelly Clarkson, and John Legend of The Voice (streaming flipside cover)	Photograph
2026-03-16	2026-04-05	Sam Heughan and Caitriona Balfe of Outlander; A preview of Hulu's Love Overboard (streaming flipside cover)	Photograph
2026-04-06	2026-04-26	The cast of The Golden Girls, on the occasion of the series' addition to MeTV's schedule A roundup of "Faith and Family" programming, including Michael Iskander of House of David and, in insets, Jonathan Roumie of The Chosen and Minnie Driver of The Faithful: Women of the Bible (flipside cover)	Photograph
2026-04-27	2026-05-17	Laurie Davidson, Ella Bruccoleri, and Dónal Finn of The Other Bennet Sister; Aidan Turner, David Tennant, and Alex Hassell of Rivals (flipside cover)	Photograph
2026-05-18	2026-06-07	Sophia Vergara, Howie Mandel, Simon Cowell, Terry Crews, and Mel B of America's Got Talent; Jimmy Fallon and Keke Palmer of Password (flipside cover)	Photograph
2026-06-08	2026-06-28	"Your Summer Binge Watch," featuring Connie Britton & Kyle Chandler of Friday Night Lights, John Krasinski of the film Jack Ryan: Ghost War, Kathy Bates of Matlock, Dominic Monaghan, Evangeline Lilly, & Matthew Fox of Lost, and Noah Wyle of The Pitt; Tina Fey of The Four Seasons (streaming flipside cover)	Binge: Photo montage; Fey: Photograph
2026-06-29	2026-07-19	Hannah Waddingham and Octavia Spencer of Ride or Die "10 Hot Movies to Stream from Home," featuring Ryan Gosling of Project Hail Mary, Kate Hudson & Hugh Jackman of Song Sung Blue, Ariana Grande of Wicked: For Good, Neve Campbell of Scream 7, and Anne Hathaway of The Devil Wears Prada 2 (streaming flipside cover)	Ride or Die: Photograph; "Binge": Photo Montage
2026-07-20	2026-08-09	Scott Michael Foster and Lacey Chabert of Paris Is Always a Good Idea; Howard Charles and Nicholas Pinnock of Fightland (streaming flipside cover)	Photograph
2026-08-10	2026-08-30	Jeremy Irvine, Jamie Roy, Harriet Slater, and Hermione Corfield of Outlander: Blood of My Blood "10 Can't-Miss New Shows: The Best of 2026 — So Far," featuring cast photos from The Fall and Rise of Reggie Dinkins, Dutton Ranch, The Other Bennet Sister, Scrubs, and Widow's Bay (streaming flipside cover)	Blood: Photograph; "Can't-Miss": Photo Montage
2026-08-31	2026-09-20	"Fall Preview" issue, featuring The Traitors: New Blood host Alan Cumming and, on the flipside, the show's contestants	Photograph
2026-09-21	2026-10-11	"Returning Favorites" issue, featuring Kelly Clarkson, Riley Green, Queen Latifah, and Adam Levine of The Voice; Hope Davis and Peter Krause of Line of Fire (flipside cover)	Photograph
2026-10-12	2026-11-01	Tim Daly and Téa Leoni of Newlyweds; Anna Maxwell Martin and David Mitchell of Ludwig (streaming flipside cover)	Photograph

== Sources ==
- TV Guide magazine cover archive
