= List of Outlander characters =

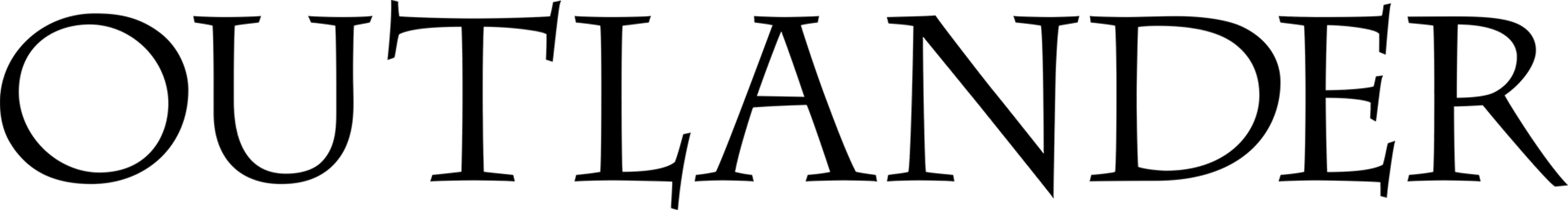

The following is a partial list of characters from Diana Gabaldon's Outlander series as first introduced, beginning with the 1991 novel Outlander. The story focuses on 20th century nurse Claire Randall, who time travels to 18th-century Scotland and finds adventure and romance with the dashing Jamie Fraser. A mix of several genres, the series features elements of historical fiction, romance, adventure, mystery and science fiction/fantasy. In August 2014, the US-based cable channel Starz debuted a TV series adaptation based on the novels.

== Main characters ==
Character	Description	First Appearance		
Character	Description	Novel	Television	Actor
Claire Fraser	Practical and independent nurse from the 1940s who finds herself in the Scottish Highlands in the 1740s. Already married to Frank Randall, she falls in love with Jamie Fraser and becomes his wife in the past. She is a gifted natural physician and an amateur botanist, skills that can appear to be witchcraft in the 18th century.	Outlander (1991)	Season 1 ("Sassenach")	Caitriona Balfe
Claire Fraser	Practical and independent nurse from the 1940s who finds herself in the Scottish Highlands in the 1740s. Already married to Frank Randall, she falls in love with Jamie Fraser and becomes his wife in the past. She is a gifted natural physician and an amateur botanist, skills that can appear to be witchcraft in the 18th century.	Outlander (1991)	Season 1 ("Sassenach")	Elizabeth Bowie (young)
Claire Fraser	Practical and independent nurse from the 1940s who finds herself in the Scottish Highlands in the 1740s. Already married to Frank Randall, she falls in love with Jamie Fraser and becomes his wife in the past. She is a gifted natural physician and an amateur botanist, skills that can appear to be witchcraft in the 18th century.	Outlander (1991)	Outlander: Blood of My Blood season 1 ("Something Borrowed")	Mae and Tuesday Roberts (young)
James "Jamie" MacKenzie Fraser (a.k.a. Jamie MacTavish)	A young Scottish redhead with a complicated past and a disarming sense of humor, Jamie is intelligent, principled, and, by 18th-century standards, educated and worldly. He falls in love with Claire. He has the title Laird of Broch Tuarach, James' family's home. His wife, Claire Fraser, is accorded the title Lady Broch Tuarach.	Outlander (1991)	Season 1 ("Sassenach")	Sam Heughan
James "Jamie" MacKenzie Fraser (a.k.a. Jamie MacTavish)	A young Scottish redhead with a complicated past and a disarming sense of humor, Jamie is intelligent, principled, and, by 18th-century standards, educated and worldly. He falls in love with Claire. He has the title Laird of Broch Tuarach, James' family's home. His wife, Claire Fraser, is accorded the title Lady Broch Tuarach.	Outlander (1991)	Season 5 ("The Fiery Cross")	Ethan Thorn (young)
Frank Randall	Claire's husband in the 20th century is a history professor with a deep interest in his genealogy and heritage. He worked for MI6 during World War II.	Outlander (1991)	Season 1 ("Sassenach")	Tobias Menzies
Jonathan Wolverton Randall (a.k.a. Black Jack Randall)	Frank Randall's ancestor, a British army officer. According to Jamie Fraser the "Black" refers to the color of his corrupt soul. He bears a strong resemblance to his descendant, Frank Randall.	Outlander (1991)	Season 1 ("Sassenach")	Tobias Menzies
Murtagh Fitzgibbons Fraser	Jamie's godfather, albeit taciturn, is very loyal to Jamie and Claire and is one of only a few people from the past to know the truth about Claire.	Outlander (1991)	Season 1 ("Sassenach")	Duncan Lacroix
Murtagh Fitzgibbons Fraser	Jamie's godfather, albeit taciturn, is very loyal to Jamie and Claire and is one of only a few people from the past to know the truth about Claire.	Outlander (1991)	Outlander: Blood of My Blood season 1 ("Providence")	Rory Alexander (young)
Colum MacKenzie	The Laird of Leoch, Colum is a chief of the MacKenzie clan, and Jamie's maternal uncle. Colum shelters Jamie and Claire from the English. He has Toulouse-Lautrec Syndrome.	Outlander (1991)	Season 1 ("Castle Leoch")	Gary Lewis
Colum MacKenzie	The Laird of Leoch, Colum is a chief of the MacKenzie clan, and Jamie's maternal uncle. Colum shelters Jamie and Claire from the English. He has Toulouse-Lautrec Syndrome.	Outlander (1991)	Outlander: Blood of My Blood season 1 ("Providence")	Séamus McLean Ross (young)
Dougal MacKenzie	Colum's younger Jacobite brother, who leads the clan in battle because his older brother is physically disabled. He is the biological father of Colum's son, Hamish, and took Jamie as foster son for a year as a teen. He has four daughters, and later a son with Geillis Duncan.	Outlander (1991)	Season 1 ("Sassenach")	Graham McTavish
Dougal MacKenzie	Colum's younger Jacobite brother, who leads the clan in battle because his older brother is physically disabled. He is the biological father of Colum's son, Hamish, and took Jamie as foster son for a year as a teen. He has four daughters, and later a son with Geillis Duncan.	Outlander (1991)	Outlander: Blood of My Blood season 1 ("Providence")	Sam Retford (young)
Geillis Duncan (a.k.a. Gillian Edgars)	The wife of the procurator fiscal who possesses knowledge of the use of herbs and plants for healing. Having an affair with Dougal MacKenzie, she is pregnant with his child when imprisoned for witchcraft. Her pregnancy wins a brief reprieve on her death sentence. Claire learns that Geillis is a time traveller from the 1960s. In 1968, Geillis (whose 20th-century name is Gillian Edgars) murders her husband, Greg Edgars, in a ritual to travel back through the stones.	Outlander (1991)	Season 1 ("Castle Leoch")	Lotte Verbeek
Roger MacKenzie	The adopted son of Reverend Wakefield, directly descended from Dougal MacKenzie and Geillis Duncan. As an adult, he meets, falls in love and marries Brianna Fraser, Claire and Jamie's daughter, later they have three children : Jeremiah, Amanda and David.	Outlander (1991)	Season 1 ("Both Sides Now")	Rory Burns (young)
Roger MacKenzie	The adopted son of Reverend Wakefield, directly descended from Dougal MacKenzie and Geillis Duncan. As an adult, he meets, falls in love and marries Brianna Fraser, Claire and Jamie's daughter, later they have three children : Jeremiah, Amanda and David.	Outlander (1991)	Season 2 ("Dragonfly in Amber")	Richard Rankin
Fergus Fraser	French orphan named Claudel whom Claire and Jamie take in and rename Fergus. He loses his hand, and later marries Laoghaire's daughter, Marsali	Dragonfly in Amber (1992)	Season 2 ("Useful Occupations and Deceptions")	Romann Berrux (young)
Fergus Fraser	French orphan named Claudel whom Claire and Jamie take in and rename Fergus. He loses his hand, and later marries Laoghaire's daughter, Marsali	Dragonfly in Amber (1992)	Season 3 ("A. Malcolm")	César Domboy
Lord John Grey	Sixteen-year-old English soldier who chances upon Jamie and Claire on the eve of the Battle of Prestonpans. Jamie spares his life, and this debt is repaid later as Grey's elder brother, the Earl of Melton, spares Jamie from execution after the Battle of Culloden. Years later, an adult Lord John becomes the governor of Ardsmuir Prison, where he and prisoner Jamie begin an unlikely but complicated friendship.	Dragonfly in Amber (1992)	Season 2 ("Je Suis Prest")	Oscar Kennedy (young)
Lord John Grey	Sixteen-year-old English soldier who chances upon Jamie and Claire on the eve of the Battle of Prestonpans. Jamie spares his life, and this debt is repaid later as Grey's elder brother, the Earl of Melton, spares Jamie from execution after the Battle of Culloden. Years later, an adult Lord John becomes the governor of Ardsmuir Prison, where he and prisoner Jamie begin an unlikely but complicated friendship.	Dragonfly in Amber (1992)	Season 3 ("All Debts Paid")	David Berry
Brianna MacKenzie	Claire and Jamie's daughter, raised in 20th-century Boston as Frank's child for the first two decades of her life. Upon learning the truth about her biological father, Jamie, she follows her mother back through the stones. As an adult, she meets, falls in love and marries Roger MacKenzie, later they have three children : Jeremiah, Amanda and David.	Dragonfly in Amber (1992)	Season 2 ("Faith")	Niamh Elwell (young)
Brianna MacKenzie	Claire and Jamie's daughter, raised in 20th-century Boston as Frank's child for the first two decades of her life. Upon learning the truth about her biological father, Jamie, she follows her mother back through the stones. As an adult, she meets, falls in love and marries Roger MacKenzie, later they have three children : Jeremiah, Amanda and David.	Dragonfly in Amber (1992)	Season 2 ("Dragonfly in Amber")	Sophie Skelton
Brianna MacKenzie	Claire and Jamie's daughter, raised in 20th-century Boston as Frank's child for the first two decades of her life. Upon learning the truth about her biological father, Jamie, she follows her mother back through the stones. As an adult, she meets, falls in love and marries Roger MacKenzie, later they have three children : Jeremiah, Amanda and David.	Dragonfly in Amber (1992)	Season 3 ("All Debts Paid")	Gemma Fray (young)
Ian Fraser Murray ("Young Ian")	Youngest son of Ian Murray and Jenny Fraser.	Voyager (1993)	Season 3 ("A. Malcolm")	John Bell
Marsali MacKimmie Fraser	Laoghaire MacKenzie's elder daughter by Simon MacKimmie.	Voyager (1993)	Season 3 ("First Wife")	Lauren Lyle
William Ransom, 9th Earl of Ellesmere	Son and heir of Lord Ellesmere and Geneva Dunsany; actually fathered by Jamie Fraser.	Voyager (1993)	Season 3 ("Of Lost Things")	Clark Butler
William Ransom, 9th Earl of Ellesmere	Son and heir of Lord Ellesmere and Geneva Dunsany; actually fathered by Jamie Fraser.	Voyager (1993)	Season 4 ("Blood of My Blood")	Oliver Finnegan
William Ransom, 9th Earl of Ellesmere	Son and heir of Lord Ellesmere and Geneva Dunsany; actually fathered by Jamie Fraser.	Voyager (1993)	Season 7 ("The Happiest Place on Earth")	Charles Vandervaart
Stephen Bonnet	Irish smuggler and pirate that Jamie and Claire encounter.	Drums of Autumn (1996)	Season 4 ("America the Beautiful")	Edward Speleers
Jocasta MacKenzie Cameron	Jamie Fraser's aunt, the youngest sister of Ellen, Colum, and Dougal MacKenzie.	Drums of Autumn (1996)	Season 4 ("Do No Harm")	Maria Doyle Kennedy
Jocasta MacKenzie Cameron	Jamie Fraser's aunt, the youngest sister of Ellen, Colum, and Dougal MacKenzie.	Drums of Autumn (1996)	Outlander: Blood of My Blood season 1 ("Providence")	Sadhbh Malin (young)

== Supporting characters ==
20th century
Character	Description	First Appearance		
Character	Description	Novel	Television	Actor
Rev. Dr. Reginald Wakefield	A vicar in Inverness and amateur historian and genealogist. He adopts young Roger.	Outlander (1991)	Season 1 ("Sassenach")	James Fleet
Rev. Dr. Reginald Wakefield	A vicar in Inverness and amateur historian and genealogist. He adopts young Roger.	Outlander (1991)	Outlander: Blood of My Blood season 2 ("Remembrance Day")	Tom Ashley (young)
Mrs. Baird	The nosy proprietor of an Inverness bed and breakfast; she hosts Claire and Frank on their second honeymoon after World War II.	Outlander (1991)	Season 1 ("Sassenach")	Kathryn Howden
Mrs. Baird	The nosy proprietor of an Inverness bed and breakfast; she hosts Claire and Frank on their second honeymoon after World War II.	Outlander (1991)	Outlander: Blood of My Blood season 1 ("Birthright")	Anita Vettesse (young)
Mrs. Graham	Reverend Wakefield's druid housekeeper, she predicts Claire's "love of two men".	Outlander (1991)	Season 1 ("Sassenach")	Tracey Wilkinson
Mrs. Graham	Reverend Wakefield's druid housekeeper, she predicts Claire's "love of two men".	Outlander (1991)	Outlander: Blood of My Blood season 2 ("Remembrance Day")	Emma Hartley-Miller (young)
Fiona Graham	Mrs. Graham's granddaughter.	Dragonfly in Amber (1992)	Season 2 ("Dragonfly in Amber")	Iona Claire
Greg Edgars	Husband of Gillian Edgars (Geillis Duncan) in 1968.	Dragonfly in Amber (1992)	Season 2 ("Dragonfly in Amber")	James Robinson
Millie Nelson	A married woman whom Claire befriends after returning to modern times.	—N/a	Season 3 ("The Battle Joined")	Kimberley Nixon
Joe Abernathy	Claire's friend from medical school.	Voyager (1993)	Season 3 ("Surrender")	Wil Johnson
Sandy Travers	Frank's longtime mistress, a Harvard professor and one of his former students.	—N/a	Season 3 ("All Debts Paid")	Sarah MacRae
Gayle	Brianna's best friend and college roommate.	Drums of Autumn (1996)	Season 4 ("Common Ground")	Simona Brown
Rob Cameron	Colleague of Brianna MacKenzie at the North of Scotland Hydro-Electric Board.	An Echo in the Bone (2009)	Season 7 ("Singapore")	Chris Fulton

=== Introduced in Outlander (1991) ===
18th century
Character	Description	First Appearance		
Character	Description	Novel	Television	Actor
Rupert MacKenzie	A loyal member of Clan MacKenzie; Jamie's second cousin.	Outlander (1991)	Season 1 ("Sassenach")	Grant O'Rourke
Rupert MacKenzie	A loyal member of Clan MacKenzie; Jamie's second cousin.	Outlander (1991)	Outlander: Blood of My Blood season 1 ("Providence")	Louis O'Rourke (young)
Angus Mhor	When Jamie takes Laoghaire's punishment, Mhor beats him. He assuages Colum's pain. The role is expanded in the television series as a close friend of Jamie's.	Outlander (1991)	Season 1 ("Sassenach")	Stephen Walters
Angus Mhor	When Jamie takes Laoghaire's punishment, Mhor beats him. He assuages Colum's pain. The role is expanded in the television series as a close friend of Jamie's.	Outlander (1991)	Outlander: Blood of My Blood season 1 ("Providence")	Marlow Walters (young)
Janet "Jenny" Fraser Murray	Jamie's strong-willed older sister is married to Ian Murray, and they have children. She is as stubborn as her brother.	Outlander (1991)	Season 1 ("Castle Leoch"); Season 7 ("Unfinished Business")	Laura Donnelly; Kristin Atherton
Glenna "Mrs. Fitz" Fitzgibbons	The long-time housekeeper of Castle Leoch, she manages all functions as head cook and butler. She is Laoghaire MacKenzie's grandmother.	Outlander (1991)	Season 1 ("Castle Leoch")	Annette Badland
Glenna "Mrs. Fitz" Fitzgibbons	The long-time housekeeper of Castle Leoch, she manages all functions as head cook and butler. She is Laoghaire MacKenzie's grandmother.	Outlander (1991)	Outlander: Blood of My Blood season 1 ("Providence")	Sally Messham (young)
Laoghaire MacKenzie	A young girl of 16 who is attracted to Jamie. She sends Claire to Geillis just prior to the witch trial because she "loves" Jamie and wants him back. She is Mrs Fitz's granddaughter. Later she becomes the mother of Marsali and Joan.	Outlander (1991)	Season 1 ("Castle Leoch")	Nell Hudson
Letitia MacKenzie	Wife of Colum, mother of Hamish.	Outlander (1991)	Season 1 ("Castle Leoch")	Aislín McGuckin
Letitia MacKenzie	Wife of Colum, mother of Hamish.	Outlander (1991)	Outlander: Blood of My Blood season 1 ("Providence")	Rebekah Lumsden (young)
Alec "Auld Alec" MacMahon	The Master of Horse of Castle Leoch wears a patch over his missing eye.	Outlander (1991)	Season 1 ("Castle Leoch")	Liam Carney
Alec "Auld Alec" MacMahon	The Master of Horse of Castle Leoch wears a patch over his missing eye.	Outlander (1991)	Outlander: Blood of My Blood season 1 ("Providence")	Michael Cooke (young)
Hamish MacKenzie	The son and heir of Colum and his wife Letitia, who has secretly been fathered by Dougal MacKenzie.	Outlander (1991)	Season 1 ("Castle Leoch")	Roderick Gilkison
Gwyllyn	A Welshman, and visiting bard at Castle Leoch.	Outlander (1991)	Season 1 ("The Way Out")	Gillebride MacMillan
Arthur Duncan	The procurator fiscal of the village of Cranesmuir, and husband of Geillis.	Outlander (1991)	Season 1 ("The Way Out")	John Sessions
Father Bain	A Cranesmuir priest, who accuses Claire of witchcraft.	Outlander (1991)	Season 1 ("The Way Out")	Tim McInnerny
Tammas Baxter	Colum's page boy and Mrs. Fitz's nephew whom Claire saves after he is poisoned.	—N/a	Season 1 ("The Way Out")	Daniel Kerr
Iona MacTavish	A relative of Jamie's.	—N/a	Season 1 ("The Gathering")	Diana Gabaldon
Ned Gowan	A lawyer from Edinburgh who works for Colum and is Claire's lawyer at her witchcraft trial.	Outlander (1991)	Season 1 ("Rent")	Bill Paterson
Ned Gowan	A lawyer from Edinburgh who works for Colum and is Claire's lawyer at her witchcraft trial.	Outlander (1991)	Outlander: Blood of My Blood season 1 ("Providence")	Conor MacNeill (young)
Willie	Young man in Dougal's rent-collecting group.	—N/a	Season 1 ("Rent")	Finn Den Hertog
Lieutenant Jeremy Foster	A Redcoat who is interested in the presence of Claire, a genteel Englishwoman, among the brutal Highlanders.	—N/a	Season 1 ("Rent")	Tom Brittney
Corporal Hawkins	Aide to Jack Randall.	Outlander (1991)	Season 1 ("The Garrison Commander")	Edmund Digby-Jones
Brian Fraser	Jamie's father, who died a few years before Claire's arrival.	Mentioned in Outlander (1991)	Season 1 ("The Garrison Commander")	Andrew Whipp
Brian Fraser	Jamie's father, who died a few years before Claire's arrival.	Mentioned in Outlander (1991)	Outlander: Blood of My Blood season 1 ("Providence")	Jamie Roy (young)
Hugh Munro	A licensed beggar, who is an able messenger and Jamie's friend.	Outlander (1991)	Season 1 ("Both Sides Now")	Simon Meacock
Harry	A Redcoat deserter who tries to rape Claire but is killed by her.	Outlander (1991)	Season 1 ("Both Sides Now")	James Groom
Horrocks	An English deserter who knows the truth that Jamie did not shoot the Sergeant-Major.	Outlander (1991)	Season 1 ("The Reckoning")	Lochlann Ó Mearáin
Clarence Marylebone, Duke of Sandringham	Has a secret connection to Jack Randall and is a secret Jacobite.	Outlander (1991)	Season 1 ("By the Pricking of My Thumbs")	Simon Callow
Andrew MacDonald	Rival clansman who later joins Jamie in fighting for Charles Stuart.	—N/a	Season 1 ("By the Pricking of My Thumbs")	Jim Sweeney
Ian Murray	Jenny's husband and Jamie's childhood friend, he lost his leg below the knee from an infection of a wound received during a battle at Daumier.	Outlander (1991)	Season 1 ("Lallybroch")	Steven Cree
Jamie Murray ("Wee Jamie")	Jenny and Ian's oldest son, named for his uncle.	Outlander (1991)	Season 1 ("Lallybroch")	Aaron Wright (young)
Jamie Murray ("Wee Jamie")	Jenny and Ian's oldest son, named for his uncle.	Outlander (1991)	Season 3 ("Surrender")	Rhys Lambert
Jamie Murray ("Wee Jamie")	Jenny and Ian's oldest son, named for his uncle.	Outlander (1991)	Season 3 ("First Wife")	Conor McCarry
Taran MacQuarrie	Leader of the Black Watch, a local militia in Scotland.	Outlander (1991)	Season 1 ("Lallybroch")	Douglas Henshall
Ronald MacNab	Drunkard tenant of Lallybroch.	Outlander (1991)	Season 1 ("Lallybroch")	Richard Jack
Mary MacNab	Ronald's wife.	Outlander (1991)	Season 3 ("Surrender")	Emma Campbell-Jones
Rabbie MacNab	Ronald and Mary's young son.	Outlander (1991)	Season 1 ("Lallybroch")	Jamie Kennedy (young)
Rabbie MacNab	Ronald and Mary's young son.	Outlander (1991)	Season 3 ("Surrender")	Stuart Campbell
Crenshaw	A member of the Watch.	—N/a	Season 1 ("Lallybroch")	Francis Magee
Lennox	A member of the Watch.	—N/a	Season 1 ("Lallybroch")	Douglas Russell
Mrs. Crook	Crook is a housekeeper at Lallybroch.	Outlander (1991)	Season 1 ("The Watch")	Margaret Fraser
Margaret "Maggie" Murray	Jenny and Ian's second child, and oldest daughter.	Outlander (1991)	Season 1 ("The Watch")	Infant
Mrs. Martins	A midwife who helps deliver Jenny's baby.	Outlander (1991)	—N/a	—N/a
Sir Fletcher Gordon	Civilian governor in charge of Wentworth Prison.	Outlander (1991)	Season 1 ("Wentworth Prison")	Frazer Hines
Marley	Jack Randall's henchman at Wentworth Prison.	Outlander (1991)	Season 1 ("Wentworth Prison")	Richard Ashton
Sir Marcus MacRannoch	Once an admirer of Jamie's mother Ellen Mackenzie, he gives refuge to Claire and Jamie in his cottage, Eldridge Manor. His cattle are used to help break Jamie out of Wentworth.	Outlander (1991)	Season 1 ("Wentworth Prison")	Brian McCardie
Sir Marcus MacRannoch	Once an admirer of Jamie's mother Ellen Mackenzie, he gives refuge to Claire and Jamie in his cottage, Eldridge Manor. His cattle are used to help break Jamie out of Wentworth.	Outlander (1991)	Outlander: Blood of My Blood season 1 ("Providence")	Dom Fraser (young)
Lady Annabelle MacRannoch	The wife of Marcus, who helps Claire tend Jamie's wounds.	Outlander (1991)	—N/a	—N/a
Malcolm Grant	Grant wanted an arranged marriage with Jamie's mother Ellen MacKenzie, and is no longer a MacKenzie ally.	Outlander (1991)	Outlander: Blood of My Blood season 1 ("Providence")	Jhon Lumsden (young)
Abbot Alexander Fraser	One of Jamie's six Fraser uncles who lives in France.	Outlander (1991)	—N/a	—N/a
Francois Anselm Mericoeur d'Armagnac (Father Anselm)	A Franciscan friar, who befriends Claire and introduces her to the Perpetual Adoration. She tells him her true story.	Outlander (1991)	Season 1 ("To Ransom a Man's Soul")	Ian Hanmore

=== Introduced in Dragonfly in Amber (1992) ===
18th century
Character	Description	First Appearance		
Character	Description	Novel	Television	Actor
Le Comte St. Germain	French nobleman who quickly becomes an enemy to Claire and Jamie.	Dragonfly in Amber (1992)	Season 2 ("Through a Glass, Darkly")	Stanley Weber
Jared Fraser	Jamie's cousin, a wine merchant in Paris.	Dragonfly in Amber (1992)	Season 2 ("Through a Glass, Darkly")	Robert Cavanah
Master Raymond	An apothecary whom Claire befriends in Paris.	Dragonfly in Amber (1992)	Season 2 ("Not in Scotland Anymore")	Dominique Pinon
Prince Charles Edward Stuart	Jacobite pretender to the British throne.	Dragonfly in Amber (1992)	Season 2 ("Not in Scotland Anymore")	Andrew Gower
Louise de la Tour de Rohan	Socialite friend of Claire's who is secretly having an affair with Prince Charles.	Dragonfly in Amber (1992)	Season 2 ("Not in Scotland Anymore")	Claire Sermonne
Mary Hawkins	English girl staying with her uncle in Paris.	Dragonfly in Amber (1992)	Season 2 ("Not in Scotland Anymore")	Rosie Day
Annalise de Marillac	Jamie's former flame.	Dragonfly in Amber (1992)	Season 2 ("Not in Scotland Anymore")	Margaux Châtelier
Joseph Duverney	The king's finance minister.	Dragonfly in Amber (1992)	Season 2 ("Not in Scotland Anymore")	Marc Duret
Alex Randall	Jack Randall's younger brother.	Dragonfly in Amber (1992)	Season 2 ("Not in Scotland Anymore")	Laurence Dobiesz
Suzette	Maid at Jared Fraser's home in Paris.	Dragonfly in Amber (1992)	Season 2 ("Not in Scotland Anymore")	Adrienne-Marie Zitt
Magnus	Butler at Jared Fraser's home in Paris.	Dragonfly in Amber (1992)	Season 2 ("Not in Scotland Anymore")	Robbie McIntosh
Louis XV	King of France.	Dragonfly in Amber (1992)	Season 2 ("Not in Scotland Anymore")	Lionel Lingelser
Madame Elise	Proprietress of a Parisian brothel.	Dragonfly in Amber (1992)	Season 2 ("Not in Scotland Anymore")	Michèle Belgrand
Mother Hildegarde	Nun in charge of L'Hôpital des Anges.	Dragonfly in Amber (1992)	Season 2 ("Useful Occupations and Deceptions")	Frances de la Tour
Sister Angelique	Nun at L'Hôpital des Anges.	Dragonfly in Amber (1992)	Season 2 ("Useful Occupations and Deceptions")	Audrey Brisson
Monsieur Foret	The king's executioner who also works at L'Hôpital des Anges.	Dragonfly in Amber (1992)	Season 2 ("La Dame Blanche")	Niall Greig Fulton
Jules de Rohan	Louise's husband.	Dragonfly in Amber (1992)	Season 2 ("La Dame Blanche")	Howard Corlett
Silas Hawkins	Mary Hawkins' uncle, an English wine merchant.	Dragonfly in Amber (1992)	Season 2 ("La Dame Blanche")	Sion Tudor Owen
Albert Danton	Mysterious man who rapes Mary.	Dragonfly in Amber (1992)	Season 2 ("La Dame Blanche")	Andrea Dolente
Simon Fraser, Lord Lovat	Jamie's abrasive paternal grandfather.	Dragonfly in Amber (1992)	Season 2 ("The Fox's Lair")	Clive Russell
Simon Fraser, Lord Lovat	Jamie's abrasive paternal grandfather.	Dragonfly in Amber (1992)	Outlander: Blood of My Blood season 1 ("Providence")	Tony Curran (young)
Simon Fraser, Master of Lovat	Lord Lovat's son and heir.	Dragonfly in Amber (1992)	Season 2 ("The Fox's Lair")	James Parris
Maisri	Seeress in the employ of Lord Lovat.	Dragonfly in Amber (1992)	Season 2 ("The Fox's Lair")	Maureen Beattie
Maisri	Seeress in the employ of Lord Lovat.	Dragonfly in Amber (1992)	Outlander: Blood of My Blood season 1 ("Needfire")	Katharine O'Donnelly (young)
Kincaid	Young man from Lallybroch who joins Jamie in fighting for Charles Stuart, but dies of his injuries after the Battle of Prestonpans.	Dragonfly in Amber (1992)	Season 2 ("The Fox's Lair")	Gregor Firth
Ross the Smith	Lallybroch blacksmith among those who fight with Jamie for Charles Stuart. Jamie sends him and the other men home on his way to Lord Lovat's, but they are captured as deserters. In the TV series, Ross and Kincaid make a pact which inspires Angus in the episode "Prestonpans", but leads to the latter's death.	Dragonfly in Amber (1992)	Season 2 ("The Fox's Lair")	Scott Kyle
Lord General George Murray	Chief commander of Charles Stuart's army.	Dragonfly in Amber (1992)	Season 2 ("Prestonpans")	Julian Wadham
Quartermaster John O'Sullivan	Battle adviser to Charles Stuart at Culloden.	Dragonfly in Amber (1992)	Season 2 ("Prestonpans")	Gerard Horan
Katherine "Kitty" Murray	Jenny and Ian's second daughter.	Dragonfly in Amber (1992)	—N/a	—N/a

=== Introduced in Voyager (1993) ===
18th century
Character	Description	First Appearance		
Character	Description	Novel	Television	Actor
Harold "Hal" Grey, Earl of Melton, Duke of Pardloe	Lord John Grey's older brother, a colonel in the British army.	Voyager (1993)	Season 3 ("The Battle Joined")	Sam Hoare
Colonel Harry Quarry	Lord John's predecessor as governor of Ardsmuir Prison.	Voyager (1993)	Season 3 ("All Debts Paid")	Jay Villiers
Duncan Innes	One of the men imprisoned at Ardsmuir with Jamie Fraser.	Voyager (1993)	Season 5 ("The Fiery Cross")	Alastair Findlay
Ronnie Sinclair	One of the men imprisoned at Ardsmuir with Jamie Fraser.	Voyager (1993)	Season 5 ("The Fiery Cross")	Paul Donnelly
William Dunsany, Viscount Ashness and Baron Derwent	Nobleman whose son and heir Gordon was a friend of Lord John's, and who died at Prestonpans. Master of the country estate Helwater.	Voyager (1993)	Season 3 ("Of Lost Things")	Rupert Vansittart
Louisa Dunsany, Viscountess Ashness and Baroness Derwent	Lord Dunsany's wife.	Voyager (1993)	Season 3 ("Of Lost Things")	Beth Goddard
Geneva Dunsany	Lord Dunsany's elder daughter, later Countess of Ellesmere.	Voyager (1993)	Season 3 ("Of Lost Things")	Hannah James
Isobel Dunsany	Lord Dunsany's younger daughter.	Voyager (1993)	Season 3 ("Of Lost Things")	Tanya Reynolds
Ludovic Ransom, 8th Earl of Ellesmere	Elderly nobleman who marries Geneva Dunsany.	Voyager (1993)	Season 3 ("Of Lost Things")	James Cameron Stewart
Jeffries	An Irish coachman employed by Lord Dunsany.	Voyager (1993)	—N/a	—N/a
Yi Tien Cho ("Mr. Willoughby")	Chinese exile living in Edinburgh in Jamie's service.	Voyager (1993)	Season 3 ("A. Malcolm")	Gary Young
Madame Jeanne	The owner of the Edinburgh brothel who is an accomplice to Jamie's smuggling operation.	Voyager (1993)	Season 3 ("A. Malcolm")	Cyrielle Debreuil
Dorcas	Prostitute at Madame Jeanne's brothel.	Voyager (1993)	Season 3 ("A. Malcolm")	Keira Lucchesi
Peggy	Prostitute at Madame Jeanne's brothel.	Voyager (1993)	Season 3 ("A. Malcolm")	Kirsty Strain
Molly	Prostitute at Madame Jeanne's brothel.	Voyager (1993) (as "Mollie")	Season 3 ("A. Malcolm")	Kimberly Sinclair
Geordie	Jamie's apprentice at his print shop.	Voyager (1993)	Season 3 ("A. Malcolm")	Lorn Macdonald
Sir Percival Turner	Superintending Customs Officer for the Edinburgh district who ignores Jamie's smuggling in exchange for bribes.	Voyager (1993)	Season 3 ("A. Malcolm")	Paul Brightwell
Lesley	One of Jamie's associates.	—N/a	Season 3 ("A. Malcolm")	Keith Fleming
Hayes	One of Jamie's associates.	—N/a	Season 3 ("A. Malcolm")	James Allenby-Kirk
Barton	A mysterious man searching Jamie's room at the brothel.	—N/a	Season 3 ("A. Malcolm")	Ian Conningham
Senga	A barmaid who demands that Mr. Willoughby pay for her time.	Voyager (1993) (as "Maggie")	Season 3 ("A. Malcolm")	Shannon Swan
Pauline	A domestic at the brothel.	Voyager (1993)	Season 3 ("A. Malcolm")	Jane MacFarlane
Reverend Archibald Campbell	A missionary caring for his sister.	Voyager (1993)	Season 3 ("Creme de Menthe")	Mark Hadfield
Margaret Campbell	Archibald's mentally unstable sister.	Voyager (1993)	Season 3 ("Creme de Menthe")	Alison Pargeter
Harry Tomkins	A customs agent in the employ of Sir Percival Turner.	Voyager (1993)	Season 3 ("Creme de Menthe")	Ian Reddington
Mr. Haugh	An apothecary in Edinburgh.	Voyager (1993)	Season 3 ("Creme de Menthe")	Gary French
Brighid	A barmaid with whom young Ian loses his virginity.	—N/a	Season 3 ("Creme de Menthe")	Zoe Barker
McDaniel	A regular buyer of Jamie's contraband spirits.	—N/a	Season 3 ("Creme de Menthe")	Robin B. Smith
Joan MacKimmie	Laoghaire MacKenzie's younger daughter by Simon MacKimmie.	Voyager (1993)	Season 3 ("First Wife")	Layla Burns
Janet Murray	Jenny and Ian's youngest daughter, twin to Michael Murray.	Voyager (1993)	Season 3 ("First Wife")	Cora Tsang
Michael Murray	Jenny and Ian's son, and twin to Janet.	Voyager (1993)	Season 7 ("Unfinished Business")	Angus Miller
Captain Raines	Captain of the Artemis, the ship Claire and Jamie take to rescue Young Ian.	Voyager (1993)	Season 3 ("The Doldrums")	Richard Dillane
Mr. Warren	Sailing master of the Artemis.	Voyager (1993)	Season 3 ("The Doldrums")	Karl Thaning
Manzetti	Crew member of the Artemis.	Voyager (1993)	Season 3 ("The Doldrums")	Cameron Robertson
Aloysius Murphy	Ship's cook on the Artemis.	Voyager (1993)	Season 3 ("The Doldrums")	Nigel Betts
Thomas Leonard	Captain of the English man-of-war Porpoise.	Voyager (1993)	Season 3 ("The Doldrums")	Charlie Hiett
Elias Pound	Midshipman on the Porpoise who is assigned to assist Claire.	Voyager (1993)	Season 3 ("The Doldrums")	Albie Marber
Jones	Steward on the Porpoise.	Voyager (1993)	Season 3 ("The Doldrums")	Gustav Gerdener
Joe Howard	Seaman on the Porpoise who is the source of the typhoid fever outbreak.	Voyager (1993)	Season 3 ("The Doldrums")	Nathan Lynn
Baxley	Second mate of the Artemis.	—N/a	Season 3 ("The Doldrums")	Russell Crous
Hogan	Seaman on the Artemis.	—N/a	Season 3 ("The Doldrums")	Nic Rasenti
Bernard Cosworth	Ship's cook on the Porpoise.	—N/a	Season 3 ("The Doldrums")	Lawrence Joffe
Annekje Johansen	Wife of the gunner on the Porpoise, who befriends Claire and helps her escape the ship.	Voyager (1993)	Season 3 ("Heaven and Earth")	Chanelle de Jager
Mr. Overholt	Purser of the Porpoise.	Voyager (1993)	Season 3 ("Heaven and Earth")	Matt Newman
Father Fogden	Disgraced priest who lives in Saint-Domingue.	Voyager (1993)	Season 3 ("Uncharted")	Nick Fletcher
Mamacita	Father Fogden's servant, and the mother of his deceased wife Ermenegilda.	Voyager (1993)	Season 3 ("Uncharted")	Vivi Lepori
Kenneth MacIver	Overseer of Jared Fraser's plantation, Blue Mountain House, on Jamaica.	Voyager (1993)	Season 3 ("The Bakra")	James McAnerney
Rosie MacIver	Kenneth's wife.	Voyager (1993)	Season 3 ("The Bakra")	Muireann Kelly
Hercules	Geillis' slave in her guise as Mrs. Abernathy on Jamaica.	Voyager (1993)	Season 3 ("The Bakra")	Apolinalho Antonio
Atlas	Hercules' twin, also a slave owned by Geillis.	Voyager (1993)	Season 3 ("Eye of the Storm")	Patrick Lavisa
Mayer Rothschild	A Jewish coin dealer based on the historical figure of the same name.	Voyager (1993)	—N/a	—N/a
Dr. Lawrence Stern	Naturalist studying the flora of Hispaniola.	Voyager (1993)	—N/a	—N/a
Mina Alcott	Widow in Jamaica who is murdered at the Governor's ball.	Voyager (1993)	—N/a	—N/a

=== Introduced in Drums of Autumn (1996) ===
18th century
Character	Description	First Appearance		
Character	Description	Novel	Television	Actor
Governor William Tryon	Governor of North Carolina.	Drums of Autumn (1996)	Season 4 ("America the Beautiful")	Tim Downie
Eutroclus	Free Black man who serves on the riverboat Sally Ann.	Drums of Autumn (1996)	Season 4 ("America the Beautiful")	Leon Herbert
Ulysses	Jocasta's slave butler.	Drums of Autumn (1996)	Season 4 ("Do No Harm")	Colin McFarlane
Phaedre	Jocasta's house slave.	Drums of Autumn (1996)	Season 4 ("Do No Harm")	Natalie Simpson
Farquard Campbell	Jocasta's loyal friend.	Drums of Autumn (1996)	Season 4 ("Do No Harm")	James Barriscale
Lieutenant Wolff	A senior naval officer who serves as the Navy's liaison with Jocasta and River Run.	Drums of Autumn (1996)	Season 4 ("Do No Harm")	Lee Boardman
John Quincy Myers	A "mountain man" from the backcountry of North Carolina.	Drums of Autumn (1996)	Season 4 ("Do No Harm")	Kyle Rees
Nayawenne	Shaman of the Tuscarora, and Chief Nacognaweto's grandmother.	Drums of Autumn (1996)	—N/a	—N/a
Adawehi	Cherokee wise woman.	—N/a	Season 4 ("Common Ground")	Tantoo Cardinal
Tawodi	Cherokee warrior.	—N/a	Season 4 ("Common Ground")	Will Strongheart
Gerhard Mueller	Patriarch of a German family that lives near Fraser's Ridge.	Drums of Autumn (1996)	Season 4 ("Savages")	Urs Rechn
Rosewitha Mueller	Gerhard's wife.	Drums of Autumn (1996)	Season 4 ("Savages")	Nicola Ransom
Petronella Mueller	Gerhard's daughter-in-law.	Drums of Autumn (1996)	Season 4 ("Savages")	Marie Hacke
Tommy Mueller	Gerhard's son.	Drums of Autumn (1996)	Season 4 ("Savages")	David Christopher Roth
Joseph Wemyss	Bond servant to Claire and Jamie Fraser.	Drums of Autumn (1996)	Season 4 ("Down the Rabbit Hole")	Alec Newman
Lizzie Wemyss Beardsley	Joseph's daughter, bond servant to Brianna Randall.	Drums of Autumn (1996)	Season 4 ("Down the Rabbit Hole")	Caitlin O'Ryan
Morag MacKenzie	William Buccleigh MacKenzie's wife, and a direct ancestor of Roger MacKenzie.	Drums of Autumn (1996)	Season 4 ("Down the Rabbit Hole")	Elysia Welch
Gerald Forbes	A wealthy lawyer in Cross Creek and Jocasta's friend.	Drums of Autumn (1996)	Season 4 ("If Not For Hope")	Billy Boyd
Nacognaweto	Chief of the Tuscarora people from the village of Anna Ooka in North Carolina.	Drums of Autumn (1996)	—N/a	—N/a
William Buccleigh MacKenzie	Son of Dougal MacKenzie and Geillis Duncan, raised by William John and Sarah MacKenzie.	Drums of Autumn (1996)	Season 5 ("The Ballad of Roger Mac"); Season 7 ("Where the Waters Meet")	Graham McTavish; Diarmaid Murtagh
Germain Fraser	The eldest child and first born son of Fergus and Marsali Fraser, elder brother of Joan, Félicité, and Henri-Christian †, he is also the eldest grandson of Claire and Jamie Fraser, and the cousin of Jemmy and Mandy MacKenzie.	Drums of Autumn (1996)	Season 5 ("The Fiery Cross")	Robin Scott
Jeremiah "Jemmy" MacKenzie	Firstborn and only son of Brianna and Roger Mackenzie, Mandy's elder brother, Claire and Jamie Fraser's grandson, cousin of: Germain, Joan, Félicité, Henri-Christian, and an unborn child.	Drums of Autumn (1996)	Season 5 ("Famous Last Words"); Season 7 ("A Practical Guide for Time-Travelers"	Andrew and Matthew Adair; Blake Johnston-Miller

=== Introduced in The Fiery Cross (2001) ===
18th century
Character	Description	First Appearance		
Character	Description	Novel	Television	Actor
Joan Fraser	Second child and eldest daughter of Fergus and Marsali Fraser.	The Fiery Cross (2001)	—N/a	—N/a
Aaron Beardsley	Owner of Beardsley's Trading Post.	The Fiery Cross (2001)	Season 5 ("Free Will")	Christopher Fairbank
Fanny Beardsley	Aaron's wife.	The Fiery Cross (2001)	Season 5 ("Free Will")	Bronwyn James
Josiah Beardsley	One of two orphaned identical twins purchased as bond servants by the Beardsleys.	The Fiery Cross (2001)	Season 5 ("The Fiery Cross")	Paul Gorman
Keziah Beardsley	Josiah's twin, deaf because of a childhood injury.	The Fiery Cross (2001)	Season 5 ("Free Will")	Paul Gorman
Isaiah Morton	Militiaman who pursues Alicia Brown despite his being already married to a woman in Granite Falls.	The Fiery Cross (2001)	Season 5 ("Free Will")	Jon Tarcy
Alicia Brown	A resident of Brownsville who falls in love with Isaiah Morton.	The Fiery Cross (2001)	Season 5 ("The Company We Keep")	Anna Burnett
Lionel Brown	Alicia's father.	The Fiery Cross (2001)	Season 5 ("The Company We Keep")	Ned Dennehy
Richard Brown	Alicia's uncle.	The Fiery Cross (2001)	Season 5 ("The Company We Keep")	Chris Larkin
Tom Christie	One of the men imprisoned at Ardsmuir with Jamie Fraser.	The Fiery Cross (2001)	Season 6 ("Echoes")	Mark Lewis Jones
Allan Christie	Tom's son.	The Fiery Cross (2001)	Season 6 ("Echoes")	Alexander Vlahos
Malva Christie	Tom's daughter.	The Fiery Cross (2001)	Season 6 ("Echoes")	Jessica Reynolds
Manfred McGillivray	Young man temporarily betrothed to Lizzie Wemyss.	The Fiery Cross (2001)		
Ute McGillivray	Manfred's mother, a compulsive matchmaker.	The Fiery Cross (2001)	Season 5 ("Between Two Fires")	Anja Karmanski
Donald MacDonald	Scottish half-pay British soldier.	The Fiery Cross (2001)	Season 6 ("Echoes")	Robin Laing

=== Introduced in A Breath of Snow and Ashes (2005) ===
18th century
Character	Description	First Appearance		
Character	Description	Novel	Television	Actor
Amanda "Mandy" MacKenzie	Daughter of Brianna Fraser and Roger MacKenzie, and granddaughter of Claire and Jamie Fraser.	A Breath of Snow and Ashes (2005)	Season 7 ("The Happiest Place on Earth")	Rosa Morris
Félicité Fraser	Third child and second daughter of Fergus and Marsali Fraser.	A Breath of Snow and Ashes (2005)	Season 8 ("Soul of a Rebel")	Kara Caldwell
Henri-Christian Fraser	The fourth child and second son of Fergus and Marsali, a dwarf.	A Breath of Snow and Ashes (2005)	Season 8 ("Soul of a Rebel")	Benjamin Moss
Jezebel Hatfield Morton	The wife Isaiah Morton abandoned in Granite Falls who comes to Cross Creek looking for him.	A Breath of Snow and Ashes (2005)		

=== Introduced in An Echo in the Bone (2009) ===
18th century
Character	Description	First Appearance		
Character	Description	Novel	Television	Actor
Minerva Wattiswade Grey	Wife of Harold Grey, Duke of Pardloe, Earl of Melton.	An Echo in the Bone (2009); Lord John and the Brotherhood of the Blade (2007)		
Adam Grey	Second son of Harold and Minerva Grey.	An Echo in the Bone (2009); Lord John and the Brotherhood of the Blade (2007)		
Henry Grey	Third and youngest son of Harold and Minerva Grey.	An Echo in the Bone (2009); Lord John and the Brotherhood of the Blade (2007)	Season 7 ("A Most Uncomfortable Woman")	Harry Jarvis
Dorothea "Dottie" Grey	Daughter and youngest child of Harold and Minerva Grey.	An Echo in the Bone (2009); Lord John and the Brotherhood of the Blade (2007)		

=== Introduced in Written in My Own Heart's Blood (2014) ===
18th century
Character	Description	First Appearance		
Character	Description	Novel	Television	Actor
Benjamin Grey	Eldest son of Harold and Minerva Grey.	Written in My Own Heart's Blood (2014); Lord John and the Brotherhood of the Blade (2007)	Season 8 ("Prophecies")	Alex Bhat

== Appearances (TV series) ==
= Main cast (credited)
= Recurring cast (3+)
= Guest cast (1-2)

=== Main cast ===
The following actors have been credited in the opening titles of the television series.

Actor	Character	Seasons									
Actor	Character	1		2	3	4	5	6	7		8
Actor	Character	Part 1	Part 2	2	3	4	5	6	Part 1	Part 2	8
Caitríona Balfe	Claire Beauchamp	Main (Note: In season 1, part 1, Claire Beauchamp is also portrayed by guest actress Elizabeth Bowie in a flashback.)	Main	Main	Main	Main	Main	Main	Main	Main	Main
Sam Heughan	Jamie Fraser	Main (Note: In seasons 5 and 7, Jamie Fraser is also portrayed by guest actor Ethan Thorn in flashbacks.)	Main	Main	Main	Main	Main	Main	Main	Main	Main
Tobias Menzies	Frank Randall	Main (Note: Menzies only appears in one episode of season four, although credited as a main cast member.)	Main	Main	Main	Main					Voice only (Note: Credited as "Special Guest Performance by" in episode one, and with the main cast in the other episodes in which his voice is featured.)
Tobias Menzies	Jonathan "Black Jack" Randall	Main	Main	Main	Main						Voice only
Graham McTavish	Dougal MacKenzie	Main	Main	Main						Guest (Note: Credited as "Special Appearance by".)	
Graham McTavish	William "Buck" MacKenzie						Main		Recurring (Note: In seasons 7-8, William "Buck" MacKenzie is portrayed by recurring actor Diarmaid Murtagh.)	Recurring	Recurring
Duncan Lacroix	Murtagh Fitzgibbons Fraser	Main	Main	Main	Main	Main	Main				
Grant O'Rourke	Rupert MacKenzie	Main (Note: O'Rourke only appears in one episode of season three, although credited as a main cast member.)	Main	Main	Main						
Stephen Walters	Angus Mhor	Main	Main	Main							
Gary Lewis	Colum MacKenzie	Main	Main	Main							
Lotte Verbeek	Geillis Duncan a.k.a. Gillian Edgars	Main (Note: Verbeek only appears in one episode of season two, although credited as a main cast member.)	Main	Main	Main					Guest (Note: Credited as "Featuring".)	
Bill Paterson	Edward "Ned" Gowan	Main	Main		Main (Note: Paterson only appears in one episode of season three, although credited as a main cast member.)						
Simon Callow	Clarence Marylebone		Main (Note: Callow only appears in one episode of season one, although credited as a main cast member.)	Main							
Laura Donnelly	Janet "Jenny" Fraser Murray	Guest	Main (Note: Donnelly only appears in one episode of season two, although credited as a main cast member.)	Main	Main					Guest (Note: In season 7, Janet "Jenny" Fraser Murray is played by guest actress Kristin Atherton.)	
Douglas Henshall	Taran MacQuarrie		Main								
Steven Cree	Ian Murray		Main (Note: Cree only appears in one episode of season two and one episode of season four, although credited as a main cast member.)	Main	Main	Main				Guest (Note: In season 7, Ian Murray is also portrayed by guest actor Gabriel Calderwood in a flashback.)	
Stanley Weber	Le Comte St. Germain			Main							
Andrew Gower	Prince Charles Edward Stuart			Main (Note: Gower only appears in one episode of season three, although credited as a main cast member.)	Main			Guest			
Rosie Day	Mary Hawkins			Main							
Dominique Pinon	Master Raymond			Main						Guest	Guest
Frances de la Tour	Mother Hildegarde			Main							
Nell Hudson	Laoghaire MacKenzie	Recurring	Recurring	Main (Note: Hudson only appears in one episode of season two, one episode of season three and one episode of season four, although credited as a main cast member.)	Main	Main				Guest	
Clive Russell	Simon Fraser			Main (Note: Russell only appears in one episode of season two, although credited as a main cast member.)							
Richard Rankin	Roger Wakefield	Guest (Note: In season 1, part 1, Roger Wakefield is portrayed by guest actor Rory Burns.)		Main (Note: Rankin only appears in one episode of season two, although credited as a main cast member.) (Note: In season 2, Roger Wakefield is also portrayed by guest actor Rory Burns.)	Main	Main	Main	Main	Main	Main	Main
Sophie Skelton	Brianna Randall			Main (Note: Skelton only appears in one episode of season two, although credited as a main cast member.) (Note: In season 2, Brianna Randall is also portrayed by guest actress Niamh Elwell. In seasons 3 and 4, Brianna Randall is also portrayed by guest actress Gemma Fray.)	Main	Main	Main	Main	Main	Main	Main
David Berry	Lord John Grey			Guest (Note: In season 2, John William Grey is portrayed by guest actor Oscar Kennedy.)	Main (Note: Berry only appears in one episode of season six, although credited as a main cast member.)	Main	Main	Main	Main	Main	Main
John Bell	Ian Fraser Murray				Main	Main	Main	Main	Main	Main	Main
César Domboy	Claudel "Fergus" Fraser			Recurring (Note: In season 2, Claudel "Fergus" Fraser is portrayed by recurring actor Romann Berrux.)	Main (Note: In season 3, Claudel "Fergus" Fraser is also portrayed by guest actor Romann Berrux.)	Main	Main	Main			Main
Lauren Lyle	Marsali MacKimmie Fraser				Main	Main	Main	Main			Main
Richard Dillane	Captain Raines				Main						
Edward Speleers	Stephen Bonnet					Main	Main				
Maria Doyle Kennedy	Jocasta MacKenzie Cameron					Main (Note: Doyle Kennedy only appears in one episode of season six, although credited as a main cast member.)	Main	Main			
Colin McFarlane	Ulysses					Main	Main				
Natalie Simpson	Phaedre					Main					
Tantoo Cardinal	Adawehi					Main					
Caitlin O'Ryan	Lizzie Wemyss					Main	Main	Main	Main		Main
Braeden Clarke	Kaheroton					Main		Main (Note: Clarke only appears in one episode of season six, although credited as a main cast member.)			
Gregory Dominic Odjig	Satehoronies					Main					
Billy Boyd	Gerald Forbes					Main (Note: Boyd only appears in one episode of season four, although credited as a main cast member.)	Main				
Carmen Moore	Wahkatiiosta					Main					
Tom Jackson	Tehwahsehwkwe					Main		Main (Note: Jackson only appears in one episode of season six, although credited as a main cast member.)			
Yan Tual	Father Alexandre Ferigault					Main (Note: Tual only appears in one episode of season four, although credited as a main cast member.)					
Sera-Lys McArthur	Johiehon					Main (Note: McArthur only appears in one episode of season four, although credited as a main cast member.)					
Chris Larkin	Richard Brown						Main (Note: Larkin only appears in one episode of season seven, although credited as a main cast member.)	Main	Main		
Ned Dennehy	Lionel Brown						Main	Main			
Mark Lewis Jones	Tom Christie							Main	Main		
Glen Gould	Chief Bird							Main			
Simon R. Baker	Still Water							Main			
Gail Maurice	Tsotehweh							Main (Note: Maurice only appears in one episode of season six, although credited as a main cast member.)			
Charles Vandervaart	William "Willie" Ransom				Guest (Note: In season 3, William "Willie" Ransom was portrayed by guest actor Clark Butler and in season 4 he was portrayed by guest actor Oliver Finnegan.)	Guest			Main	Main	Main
Izzy Meikle-Small	Rachel Hunter								Recurring	Recurring	Main
Kieran Bew	Captain Charles Cunningham										Main
Frances Tomelty	Elspeth Cunningham										Main
Turlough Convery	Benjamin Cleveland										Main (Note: Convery is credited with the main cast in episodes nine and ten, and as guest starring in the other episodes in which he appears.)

=== Recurring cast ===
The following actors have been credited in at least three episodes within a season of the television series. Only named characters are listed.

Actor	Character	Seasons									
Actor	Character	1		2	3	4	5	6	7		8
Actor	Character	Part 1	Part 2	2	3	4	5	6	Part 1	Part 2	8
James Fleet	Rev. Dr. Reginald Wakefield	Recurring	Guest	Guest							
Tracey Wilkinson	Mrs. Graham	Guest	Guest	Guest							
Annette Badland	Glenna Fitzgibbons	Recurring	Guest								
Liam Carney	Old Alec	Guest	Guest								
Aislín McGuckin	Letitia MacKenzie	Recurring	Guest								
Roderick Gilkison	Hamish MacKenzie	Recurring									
Daniel Kerr	Tammas	Guest	Guest								
Lucy Hollis	Jeanie Hume	Guest	Guest								
Finn Den Hertog	Willie	Recurring	Recurring								
Andrew Whipp	Brian Fraser	Guest	Guest							Recurring	
Jim Sweeney	Andrew MacDonald		Guest	Recurring	Guest						
Douglas Russell	Lennox		Recurring								
Claire Sermonne	Louise de Rohan			Recurring							
Marc Duret	Joseph Paris Duverney			Recurring							
Lionel Lingelser	King Louis XV of France			Recurring							
Laurence Dobiesz	Alexander Randall			Recurring							
Michèle Belgrand	Madame Elise			Recurring							
Adrienne-Marie Zitt	Suzette			Recurring							
Robbie McIntosh	Magnus			Recurring							
Marième Diouf	Delphine			Recurring							
Niall Greig Fulton	Monsieur Forez			Recurring							
Scott Kyle	Ross			Recurring							
Gregor Firth	Kincaid			Recurring							
Julian Wadham	Lord General George Murray			Recurring	Guest						
Gerard Horan	Quartermaster John O'Sullivan			Recurring	Guest						
Iona Claire	Fiona Graham Buchan			Guest	Guest	Recurring			Guest	Guest	Guest
Wil Johnson	Dr. Joe Abernathy				Recurring		Guest				
Keith Fleming	Lesley				Recurring	Guest		Guest			
James Allenby-Kirk	Hayes				Recurring	Guest		Guest			
Gary Young	Yi Tien Cho a.k.a. Mr. Willoughby				Recurring						
Mark Hadfield	Archibald Campbell				Recurring						
Alison Pargeter	Margaret Campbell				Recurring						
Charlie Hiett	Captain Thomas Leonard				Recurring						
Russell Crous	Second Mate Baxley				Recurring						
Nic Rasenti	Hogan				Recurring						
Cameron Robertson	Manzetti				Recurring						
Tim Downie	Governor William Tryon					Recurring	Recurring				
Grant Stott	Captain Freeman					Recurring					
Leon Herbert	Eutroclus					Recurring					
Kyle Rees	John Quincy Myers					Recurring	Recurring	Guest			
Ciaron Kelly	Ernie Buchan					Guest			Guest	Guest	Guest
Martin Donaghy	Bryan Cranna					Recurring	Guest				
Sarah Collier	Murdina Bug						Recurring	Recurring	Guest		
Hugh Ross	Arch Bug						Recurring	Recurring	Recurring	Guest	
Paul Gorman	Josiah Beardsley						Recurring	Recurring	Guest		Recurring
Paul Gorman	Keziah Beardsley						Recurring	Recurring	Guest		Recurring
Jon Tarcy	Isaiah Morton						Recurring				
Michael Xavier	Lieutenant Hamilton Knox						Recurring				
Paul Donnelly	Ronnie Sinclair						Recurring	Recurring	Guest		
Robin Scott	Germain Fraser						Recurring	Recurring			Recurring
Alastair Findlay	Duncan Innes						Recurring	Guest			
Gary Lamont	Evan Lindsay						Recurring	Recurring	Guest		Recurring
Jack Tarlton	Kenny Lindsay						Recurring	Guest	Guest		Guest
Gilly Gilchrist	Geordie Chisholm						Recurring	Guest			
Reno Cole	Hugh Findlay						Recurring				
Francesco Piacentini-Smith	Iain Og Findlay						Recurring				
Andrew and Matthew Adair	Jeremiah "Jemmy" MacKenzie						Recurring	Recurring	Recurring		
Blake Johnston-Miller	Jeremiah "Jemmy" MacKenzie								Recurring	Recurring	Recurring
Brennan Martin	Wendigo Donner						Guest		Recurring		
Jessica Reynolds	Malva Christie							Recurring	Guest		
Alexander Vlahos	Allan Christie							Recurring	Guest		
Robin Laing	Donald MacDonald							Recurring	Guest		
Joanne Thomson	Amy McCallum Lindsay							Recurring			Guest
Caleb Reynolds	Aidan McCallum							Recurring			
Cillian McDonald	Aidan McCallum										Guest
Antony Byrne	Hiram Crombie							Recurring	Guest		Recurring
Pauline Turner	Mrs. Crombie							Recurring			Guest
Thérèse Bradley	Mistress McGregor							Recurring			
Malcolm Shield	Mr. McGregor							Recurring			
Ryan Hunter	Padraic MacNeill							Recurring			
Euan Bennet	Obadiah Henderson							Recurring			
Joey Phillips	Doctor Denzell Hunter								Recurring	Recurring	Recurring
Harry Jarvis	Henry Grey								Guest	Recurring	Guest
Rosa Morris	Amanda "Mandy" MacKenzie								Recurring	Recurring	Recurring
Ben Lambert	Captain Richardson								Recurring	Recurring	Guest
Chris Fulton	Rob Cameron								Recurring	Recurring	Guest (Note: Uncredited.)
Angus Macfadyen	Brigadier General Simon Fraser								Recurring		
Nikosis Sakihaw Kingfisher	Swiftest of Lizards a.k.a. Ian James								Guest		Recurring
Barry O'Connor	Colonel Daniel Morgan								Guest	Guest	
Gloria Obianyo	Mercy Woodcock									Recurring	Guest
Sutara Gayle	Mrs. Figg									Recurring	
Silvia Presente	Jane "Arabella" Pocock									Recurring (Note: In season 7, Jane Pocock is also portrayed by guest actress Lily Rose O'Neill in a flashback.)	Guest
Jonathan Kerrigan	Reverend Peleg Woodsworth									Recurring	
Florrie May Wilkinson	Frances "Fanny" Pocock									Recurring (Note: In season 7, Frances Pocock is also portrayed by guest actresses Helena and Isabelle Edmonstone in a flashback.)	Recurring
Michael Lindall	Perseverance Wainwright a.k.a. Percival "Percy" Beauchamp									Guest	Recurring
Carla Woodcock	Amaranthus Cowden Grey										Recurring
Benjamin Moss	Henri-Christian Fraser										Recurring
Alex Bhat	Benjamin Grey										Recurring
Tomisin Ajani	Aaron Whitaker										Recurring
Hamza Ripley Abdallah	Tom MacLeod										Recurring

=== Guest cast ===
The following actors have been credited in one or two episodes within a season of the television series. Only named characters are listed.

Actor	Character	Seasons									
Actor	Character	1		2	3	4	5	6	7		8
Actor	Character	Part 1	Part 2	2	3	4	5	6	Part 1	Part 2	8
Tom Brittney	Lieutenant Jeremy Foster	Guest		Guest							
Simon Meacock	Hugh Munro	Guest		Guest							
Jamie Kennedy	Rabbie MacNab		Guest	Guest							
Stuart Campbell	Rabbie MacNab				Guest						
Aaron Wright	James "Wee Jamie" Fraser Murray		Guest								
Rhys Lambert	James "Wee Jamie" Fraser Murray				Guest						
Conor McCarry	James "Wee Jamie" Fraser Murray				Guest					Guest	
Margaret Fraser	Mrs. Crook		Guest	Guest							
Robert Cavanah	Jared Fraser			Guest	Guest						
Sam Hoare	Harold "Hal" Grey, Earl of Melton				Guest					Guest	
Jay Villiers	Colonel Harry Quarry				Guest			Guest			
Layla Burns	Joan MacKimmie				Guest	Guest				Guest	
Chris Donald	Phillip Wylie					Guest	Guest				
Mercy Ojelade	Mary					Guest		Guest			
Josh Whitelaw	Ethan MacKinnon					Guest	Guest				
Elysia Welch	Morag MacKenzie					Guest	Guest				
Samuel Collings	Edmund Fanning					Guest	Guest				
Melanie Gray	Margaret Tryon					Guest	Guest				
Simon Harrison	General George Washington					Guest					
Gary Fannin	General George Washington									Guest	
Morgan Holmstrom	Wahionhaweh a.k.a. Emily							Guest	Guest		Guest
James Weber Brown	Cornelius Harnett							Guest	Guest		
Eugene O'Hare	Governor Josiah Martin							Guest	Guest		
Katie Redford	Margit							Guest	Guest		

==== Season 1 ====
- Kathryn Howden as Mrs. Baird
- Prentis Hancock as Uncle Lamb
- Donald Gillies as William Talbot
- Donald Sinclair as Fingal Duncan
- Kenny Lindsay as Clyde MacKenzie
- David MacKenzie as Kyle
- Artair Donald as Malcolm
- Muireann Kelly as Dolina
- Tim McInnerny as Father Bain
- Gillebride MacMillan as Gwyllyn the Bard
- John Sessions as Arthur Duncan
- Lynsey-Anne Moffat as Mrs. Baxter
- David McKay as Niall Drummond
- Nicola Clark as Shona MacNeill
- Bryan Larkin as Geordie
- Diana Gabaldon as Iona MacTavish
- Valerie Edmond as Donalda Gilchrist
- Tam Dean Burn as Alastair
- Mark Kydd as Marcus
- Linda Jane Devlin as Morag
- Belle Jones as Shirley
- Kate Donnelly as Muriel
- Robert Williamson as Torcall Iverson
- Martin Burns as Beathan Young
- John Heffernan as Brigadier General Lord Oliver Thomas
- Ian Dunn as Captain Yates
- Matthew Steer as Lieutenant Hughes
- Edmund Digby-Jones as Corporal Hawkins
- Kevin Mains as Andrew Gow
- Frank Gilhooley as Torin
- Hilary MacLean as Edina
- Rachel McReath as Mairi
- Nina Gilhooly as Isabella
- John Wark as Detective Collins
- Alan McHugh as Sergeant McKinney
- Olivia Morgan as Sally
- James Groom as Harry
- Nicholas Aaron as Arnold
- Gerry McLaughlin as Constable Boyle
- Lochlann O'Mearain as Horrocks
- Graeme McKnight as Private McGinnis
- James Young as Alexander MacDonald
- Andrew Rothney as Neil MacDonald
- Paul Tinto as Rob MacDonald
- Kern Falconer as Kilgore
- Mark McDonnell as Watt
- Johnny Austin as John Macrae
- Mark Prendergast as Alastair Duffie
- Kim Allan as Robena Donaldson
- Francis Magee as Crenshaw
- Richard Jack as Ronald MacNab
- Matthew Douglas as Corporal Dawson
- Richard Cant as Collins
- Paul Charlton as Duncan
- Naomi Neilson as Mabel
- David Leith as Robert
- Martin Brody as Seoirse Ward
- Mark Jeary as Private Edward Richards
- Sally Howitt as Kyrie
- Richard Ashton as Marley
- Frazer Hines as Sir Fletcher Gordon
- Brian McCardie as Sir Marcus MacRannoch
- Gary Lind as Absalom
- Ian Hanmore as Father Anselm
- Sandy Grierson as Brother Paul

==== Season 2 ====
- Sandy Welch as Dr. Edwards
- Margaux Châtelier as Annalise de Marillac
- Audrey Brisson as Sister Angelique
- Gaia Weiss as Countess St. Germain
- Howard Corlett as Jules de Rohan
- Siôn Tudor Owen as Silas Hawkins
- Ian Bustard as Vicomte Marigny
- Andrea Dolente as Danton
- Herbert Forthuber as General D'Arbanville
- Paul Lacoux as Monsignor Flèche
- Scarlett Mack as Toinette
- Ilario Calvo as Father Laurentin
- Maureen Beattie as Maisri
- James Parris as Simon Fraser
- Tyler Collins as Private Lucas
- Billy Griffin, Jr. as Corporal Grant
- Alex Hope as Richard Anderson
- Alice McMillan as Molly Cockburn
- Bridget McCann as Alice McMurdo
- Sarah Higgins as Allina Clerk
- Tom Cox as Colonel James Gardner
- Robert Curtis as Lieutenant Barnes
- Brendan Patricks as Captain Claremont
- Sean Hay as Donald Cameron of Lochiel
- James Robinson as Greg Edgars
- Carol Ann Crawford as Mrs. Berrow
- Charles Jamieson as Mr. Berrow

==== Season 3 ====
- Oliver Tilney as Lieutenant Wallace
- Colin Stinton as Dean Jackson
- Kimberley Nixon as Millie Nelson
- Roger Ringrose as Dr. Thorne
- Rory Barraclough as Frederick MacBean
- Ryan Ralph Gerrard as Giles McMartin
- Greg Esplin as Hamish
- Geoff McGivern as Dr. Simms
- Emma Campbell-Jones as Mary MacNab
- Rufus Wright as Captain Samuel Lewis
- Will Richards as Private Jenkins
- Ryan Fletcher as Corporal MacGregor
- Martin Delaney as Jerry Nelson
- Martin Docherty as Mackay
- Murray McArthur as Duncan Kerr
- Sarah MacRae as Sandy Travers
- Shane Quigley Murphy as Patrick
- Neil Ashton as Corporal Brame
- Hannah James as Lady Geneva Dunsany
- Tanya Reynolds as Lady Isobel Dunsany
- Rupert Vansittart as Lord William Dunsany
- Beth Goddard as Lady Louisa Dunsany
- James Cameron Stewart as Lord Ellesmere
- Fiona Francis as Lady Grozier
- Greg Powrie as John Burton
- Richard Addison as Mr. Evans
- Ali Craig as Dorsey
- Mitchell Mullen as Dean Tramble
- Douglas Reith as Professor Brown
- Cyrielle Debreuil as Jeanne LeGrand
- Lorn Macdonald as Geordie
- Ian Conningham as Barton
- Paul Brightwell as Sir Percival Turner
- Shannon Swan as Senga
- Jane MacFarlane as Pauline
- Keira Lucchesi as Dorcas
- Kirsty Strain as Peggy
- Kimberly Sinclair as Molly
- Ian Reddington as Harry Tompkins
- Zoe Barker as Brighid
- Gary French as Mr. Haugh
- Robin B. Smith as McDaniel
- Cora Tsang as Janet Murray
- Albie Marber as Elias Pound
- Nigel Betts as Aloysius Murphy
- Karl Thaning as First Mate Warren
- Gustav Gerdener as Seaman Jones
- Lawrence Joffe as Bernard Cosworth
- Nathan Lynn as Joe Howard
- Chanelle De Jager as Annekje Johansen
- Matt Newman as Mr. Overholt
- Nick Fletcher as Father Fogden
- Vivi Lepori as Mamacita
- James McAnerney as Kenneth MacIver
- Muireann Kelly as Rosie MacIver
- Apolinhalo Antonio as Hercules
- Joel Rosenblatt as Henry
- Thapelo Sebogodi as Temeraire
- Adrian Collins as Diogo
- Victor Kalambai as Abeeku
- Laudo Liebenberg as Erasmo
- Patrick Lavisa as Atlas
- Brett Williams as Mr. Oliver
- Jessica Walsh as Lucille Oliver
- Nandi Horak as Mrs. Oliver

==== Season 4 ====
- Rainer Sellien as Baron Penzler
- Ainsley Jordan as Judith Wylie
- Graeme Stirling as Mr. Stanhope
- Geoffrey Newland as Mr. Lillington
- Peter Collins as Sergeant Heyns
- James Ringer Beck as Private Griswold
- James Barriscale as Farquard Campbell
- Craig McGinlay as MacNeill
- Lee Boardman as Lieutenant Wolff
- Brian Ferguson as Lucius Gordon
- Cameron Jack as Overseer Byrnes
- Gerry Kielty as Kyle
- Jerome Holder as Rufus
- Joel Okocha as Thomas
- Trevor Carroll as Ta'wineonawira "Otter Tooth"
- Colin Michael Carmichael as Peter
- Flint Eagle as Tskili Yona
- Simona Brown as Gayle
- Will Strongheart as Tawodi
- Wesley French as Chief Nawohali
- Crystle Lightning as Giduhwa
- Urs Rechn as Gerhard Mueller
- Nicola Ransom as Rosewitha Mueller
- David Christopher Roth as Tommy Mueller
- Marie Hacke as Petronella Mueller
- Hilary Lyon as Patty Baird
- Stuart McQuarrie as Tim Baird
- Laura Ferries as Hester
- Samuel Pashby as Danny Graham
- Albert Welling as Pastor Gottfried
- Caoimhe Clough as Isobeail
- Alec Newman as Joseph Wemyss
- Caitlin Ward as Marion
- Edwin Flay as John Gillette
- Elizabeth Appleby as Martha Washington
- Nolan Willis as Tom
- Jack Reid as John Frohock
- John Mackie as Malachi Fyke
- Tom Hardwicke as Gotarzes
- Tim Barrow as Vardanes
- Kieran Baker as Lysias
- Andrew McIntosh as Peter
- James MacKenzie as Caleb
- Andrew Steele as Judge Alderdyce
- Stuart McMillan as Captain McPeters
- Louise Oliver as Miss Forbes
- Maggie Macleod as Mrs. Alderdyce
- Tim Chipping as Sergeant Southworth
- Mat Urey as Sergeant Scott
- Ryan Havelin as Corporal Benton

==== Season 5 ====
- Mark Cox as Reverend Caldwell
- Anita Vettesse as Margaret Chisholm
- Luke Roskell as Lee Withers
- Paul Kennedy as Herman Husband
- Callum Coates as John Evans
- James Doherty as Charles Turnbull
- Andy Apollo as Mr. Marsden
- Nicola Jo Cully as Nonie Farrish
- Paul Cassidy as Leith Farrish
- Carole Anders as Ruth Aberfeldy
- Anja Karmanski as Ute McGillivray
- Bronwyn James as Fanny Beardsley
- Christopher Fairbank as Aaron Beardsley
- Susan Coyle as Joan Findlay
- Anna Burnett as Alicia Brown
- Sarah Belcher as Meg Brown
- Muireann Brown as Lucinda Brown
- Connor McIndoe as Hiram Brown
- Stephen McCole as Graham Menzies
- Stephen Mitchell as Father Beggs
- Samantha Dakin as Nurse Atwell
- James Gaddas as Judge Martin Atticus
- Stephen Clyde as Robert Barlow
- Clive Hayward as Quincy Arbuckle
- Sharon Young as Mrs. Laurence
- Helen McAlpine as Mrs. Shepherd
- Christopher Bowen as Hector Cameron
- Rosie Graham as Morna Cameron
- Miles Richardson as Colonel Chadwick
- Matthew Cottle as Hubert Sherston
- Charlotte Asprey as Phoebe Sherston
- Jack Stewart as Charles Morgan
- Thomas Mugglestone as Henry Jones
- Leah Shine as Eppie
- Lorraine McIntosh as Mrs. Sylvie
- Peter Warnock as Capitano Howard
- Richard Gadd as Duff
- Megan McGuire as Mabel
- Gerald Tyler as Arvin Hodgepile
- Michael Monroe as Cuddy Brown
- Alexis Rodney as Tebbe
- Calum Barbour as Garrick
- Andrew John Tait as Hanlon
- Hayley Doherty as Rose Brown

==== Season 6 ====
- Nathan Byrne as James McCready
- Brian Pettifer as Old Charlie
- Dyfan Dwyfor as Private Hughes
- Solly McLeod as Private Lambie
- Nebli Basani as Alastair McLeod
- Richard Glaves as Captain Thornton
- Anne Kidd as Grannie Wilson
- David Gant as The Sin Eater
- Blair Lamora as Walela
- Barbara Patrick as Selu
- Sinead Macinnes as Hortense MacNeill
- Marty Wildman as Tehhonahtake
- Michael Geary as Scotchee Cameron
- Shauna Macdonald as Flora MacDonald
- Russell Watters as Allan MacDonald
- Freddie Stevenson as Ainsley Beeston
- Dominic Wolf as Captain Chapman
- David Mahoney as Fogarty Simms
- Adam Kotz as Sheriff Tolliver
- Michael Cooke as Ezra
- Mark Rannoch as Jack
- Hunter Bishop as Amon Oakes
- Chris Dennis as Curtis Brown
- Tim Faraday as Jacoby

==== Season 7 ====
- Sarah Finigan as Sadie Ferguson
- Liza Sadovy as Maisie Tolliver
- Iain MacRae as Reverend McMillan
- Reanne Farley as Elizabeth Martin
- Harri Pitches as Lieutenant Tate
- Euan Macnaughton as Ross Campbell
- Angus Yellowlees as Rodham
- Kim McGarrity as Lydia
- Tobi Bakare as Walter Woodcock
- Daniel Gosling as Lieutenant Stactoe
- Cameron Anderson as Major General St. Clair
- Olivier Raynal as Brigadier Generale Fermoy
- Cameron Fulton as Andy Pfeiffer
- Brad Morrison as Craig Dowd
- Daren Elliott Holmes as Antioch Johnson
- Donna Williams as Mrs. Johnson
- Gemma McElhinney as Mrs. Raven
- Emma Hindle as Mrs. Wellman
- Bradley Connell as Tommy Wellman
- Henry Ashton as Lieutenant Sandy Hammond
- Kevin Lennon as Lionel Menzies
- Josh Morrison as Bobby Hurragh
- Fiona Knowles as Mrs. Stewart
- Mark Frost as Major General John Burgoyne
- Adam Astill as Colonel Grant
- Stefan Willi Wang as Baron Friedrich Von Riedesel
- Felix Uff as Captain Sir Francis Clerke
- Johannes Schreiber as Gruenwald
- Euan Stamper as Private Taft
- Rod Hallett as Major General Benedict Arnold
- Ged Simmons as Major General Horatio Gates
- Fraser Bryson as Tim Murphy
- Sandy Jack as Joey Boswell Murray
- Angus Miller as Michael Murray
- Sophia McLean as Margaret Murray Lyle
- Adam McNamara as John Murray
- Orla Russell as Angelica Lyle
- Angus Kennedy as Amias Ratliff
- Lucinda Dryzek as Sissy Bertram
- Paul Sparkes as Captain Morse
- Christine Steel as Peggy Chew
- Connor Byrne as Cumberpatch
- Jamie Newall as Reverend Corey
- Ben Freeman as Corporal Jethro Woodbine
- Anthony Howell as Colonel Watson Smith
- Adam Jackson-Smith as Captain Harkness
- Joe Rising as Captain Baines
- Nicholas Ralph as Jeremiah "Jerry" Walter MacKenzie
- David McGowan as Constable Kinley
- Hannah Jarrett-Scott as Constable Laughlin
- Charles Créhange as Marquis de Lafayette
- John Whittle as Colonel Waldron
- Martin Oelbermann as Oberst von Schnell
- Chris Porter as General Charles Lee
- Hyoie O'Grady as Lieutenant Judah Bixby
- Tom Duncan as Lieutenant Beautyman
- Wilf Scolding as Private Abraham Shaftstall
- Max Pemberton as Charlie Whelan
- Ben Cura as Captain Jared Leckie

==== Season 8 ====
- Miguel Alvarez as Sebastian Vasquez
- Paddy Duff as Lieutenant Graves
- Kara Caldwell as Felicité Fraser
- Lucy Jack as Joanie Fraser
- Ethan Chalmers as Orrie McCallum
- Bill Caple as Private Thomas
- Gerard Miller as Captain Ronson
- Jason Callender as Mr. Jones
- Ewan Donald as Gordon McLure
- Estella Daniels as Susannah Whitaker
- Annelle Olaleye as Agnes Whitaker
- Sapphire Joy as Binta
- Nicholas Tizzard as Major General Alexander Leslie
- Daniel Crespin as Mr. Bembridge
- Mark Huberman as Lieutenant Colonel Francis Marion
- Lemuel Ariel Adou as Christophe
- Christy O'Donnell as Private Winslow Carver
- Meegwun Fairbrother as Thayendanegea a.k.a. Joseph Brant
- Océane Kitura Bohémier-Tootoo as Ahdohwahgeseon a.k.a. Catharine Brant
- V. Lamont Gillies as Abigail
- Brandon Alexis as Ahroniaronwateh
- Sam Garioch as Private Chesley
- Hannah Boyd as Mrs. Jeanne Louvière
- Charles Aitken as Major Patrick Ferguson
