= Harriet Slater =

Harriet Slater may refer to:

- Harriet Slater (actress) (born 1994), English actress
- Harriet Slater (politician) (1903–1976), British politician
