= Roger McKenzie =

Roger McKenzie may refer to:

- Roger McKenzie (musician) (1971–1995), English musician and DJ
- Roger McKenzie (comics) (1950–2026), American comic book writer
- Roger McKenzie, British activist associated with the Campaign for Nuclear Disarmament

== See also ==
- Roger MacKenzie, a fictional character in the novel series and TV series Outlander
