= Pearl (2020 film) =

- Directed by: Bobby Roth
- Written by: Bobby Roth
- Produced by: Bobby Roth; Jeffrey White
- Starring: Anthony LaPaglia; Larsen Thompson; Sarah Carter
- Cinematography: John S. Bartley; Chris Burns
- Edited by: Jean Crupper
- Music by: Paul Haslinger
- Production companies: Jung N Restless Productions Inc. Jeffrey White Productions
- Distributed by: Quiver Distribution
- Release date: 11 August 2020
- Running time: 93 minutes
- Country: United States
- Language: English

Pearl is a 2020 American drama film directed by Bobby Roth, starring Anthony LaPaglia, Larsen Thompson and Sarah Carter.

== Cast ==
- Anthony LaPaglia as Jack Wolf
- Larsen Thompson as Pearl
- Sarah Carter as Helen
- Barbara Williams as Eve
- Néstor Carbonell as Anthony
- J. August Richards as Isaac Robbins
- Melissa Macedo as Silvia
- Nighttrain Schickele as Zack
- Bruce Davison as The Dean
- Reed Diamond as Marty Siegel

== Release ==
The film was released on 11 August 2020.

== Reception ==
Frank Schenk of The Hollywood Reporter wrote that Roth "delivers a familiar-feeling but affecting tale about a middle-aged man who finds emotional redemption when he’s suddenly tasked with parental responsibilities he never imagined he’d have." Bradley Gibson of Film Threat gave the film a score of 8/10 and wrote, "The film explores dark territory but treats the subjects with emotional intelligence and sensitivity. Whether or not Jack and Pearl come to mean anything to each other, the journey they take toward becoming “father and daughter” is enlightening."

Joe Leydon of Variety wrote, "Wildly uneven but sporadically affecting, Bobby Roth’s Pearl is a curiously disjointed drama that relies on the compelling performances of veteran actor Anthony LaPaglia and promising newcomer Larsen Thompson for most of its emotional impact."
