= Tarot (2024 American film) =

Film by Spenser Cohen and Anna Halberg

- Theatrical release poster
- Directed by: Spenser Cohen; Anna Halberg
- Written by: Spenser Cohen; Anna Halberg
- Based on: Horrorscope by Nicholas Adams
- Produced by: Leslie Morgenstein; Scott Glassgold; Elysa Koplovitz Dutton
- Starring: Harriet Slater; Adain Bradley; Avantika; Wolfgang Novogratz; Humberly González; Larsen Thompson; Olwen Fouéré; Jacob Batalon
- Cinematography: Elie Smolkin
- Edited by: Tom Elkins; Josh Sgarlata
- Music by: Joseph Bishara
- Production companies: Screen Gems; Alloy Entertainment; Ground Control
- Distributed by: Sony Pictures Releasing
- Release date: May 3, 2024
- Running time: 92 minutes
- Country: United States
- Language: English
- Budget: $8 million
- Box office: $49.3 million

Tarot is a 2024 American supernatural horror film written and directed by Spenser Cohen and Anna Halberg, in their feature film directorial debuts, based on the 1992 novel Horrorscope by Nicholas Adams. The film stars Harriet Slater, Adain Bradley, Avantika, Wolfgang Novogratz, Humberly González, Larsen Thompson, and Jacob Batalon as a group of college students who, after using a strange Tarot deck, begin to gruesomely die one by one. Olwen Fouéré co-stars.

Tarot was released in the United States by Sony Pictures Releasing on May 3, 2024. The film received generally negative reviews from critics but was a box office success, grossing $49.3 million worldwide over a budget of $8 million.

== Plot ==
A group of college friends – Haley, Grant, Paxton, Paige, Madeline, Lucas, and Elise – rent a mansion in the Catskills for Elise's birthday. As the atmosphere turns awkward following Haley and Grant's recent breakup, the group attempt to lighten the mood by having Haley read their fortunes with a box of strange old tarot cards discovered in the basement. Elise gets The High Priestess; Lucas gets The Hermit; Madeline The Hanged Man; Paige The Magician; and Paxton The Fool. Grant receives The Devil; Haley herself gets the Death card.

The next day, the group returns to campus. That night, Elise is lured to the attic then attacked by a monstrous version of The High Priestess, who proceeds to bludgeon her to death with the attic ladder. The group meets again after finding out about Elise's death and that night, while returning home, Lucas is terrorized by The Hermit and chased into the restricted area of a train station, before being killed by a speeding train. Each death corresponds to the tarot readings the friends received.

Suspecting something amiss with the deck and they are in danger, the remaining five visit Alma Astrom, an expert on tarot they found online. Alma reveals that the cards belonged to an astrologer who, in 1798, served a Hungarian count and would predict the future for him. After a reading that his pregnant wife and child would die in childbirth came true, the grief-stricken count ordered his men to kill the astrologer's daughter as revenge. The astrologer, enraged with grief, doomed the count and his friends to death with her cards, then killed herself and cursed her deck to kill anyone who used it. The cards are responsible for several massacres over the years, including Alma's own group of friends. She was the sole survivor, as she did not do a reading on herself. Alma urges them to destroy the deck. While driving to the Catskills mansion, their car breaks down on a bridge. Madeline freaks out, leaves the car and runs away, only to be hanged by The Hanged Man. A terrified Paxton returns to campus, where The Fool stalks and attacks him in an elevator.

At the mansion, Haley, Grant, and Paige are unable to burn the cards and request Alma's help. Alma summons the astrologer's spirit, but the astrologer does a reading on her and kills her with the Six of Swords. The Magician lures Paige into the basement and hypnotizes her. She hides in a box but gets locked inside, and The Magician fatally saws her in half. Desperate, Haley comes up with the idea to read the astrologer's horoscope. As Grant is dragged away by The Devil, Haley does a reading on the astrologer, giving her Death. Eventually, Haley lets go of the grief from her mother's death. The astrologer's spirit is burned alongside the deck.

Haley and Grant reconcile over their survival. They reunite with Paxton, who survived thanks to his roommate opening the elevator door and making The Fool disappear.

== Cast ==
- Harriet Slater as Haley
- Adain Bradley as Grant
- Jacob Batalon as Paxton
- Avantika as Paige
- Humberly González as Madeline
- Wolfgang Novogratz as Lucas
- Larsen Thompson as Elise
- Olwen Fouéré as Alma

== Production ==
Deadline Hollywood reported the production of Horrorscope in June 2022, with Jacob Batalon, Alana Boden, Avantika Vandanapu, Adain Bradley joining the cast. The film was directed and written by Spenser Cohen and Anna Halberg, based on Nicholas Adams's 1992 novel of the same name. Ground Control's Scott Glassgold produced through Alloy Entertainment, together with Leslie Morgenstein and Elysa Koplovitz Dutton. Halberg and Cohen served as executive producers. Screen Gems also produced the film. In July 2022, Humberly González joined the cast. In October 2022, Harriet Slater joined the cast. Filming took place in Belgrade, Serbia.

Production design was by New Zealand production designer Felicity Abbott.

In January 2024, the film was renamed to Tarot.

== Release ==
Tarot was originally scheduled to be released on June 28, 2024, before being moved up to May 10, 2024. It was later moved to May 3, 2024.

== Reception ==
=== Box office ===
As of August 2, 2024, Tarot has grossed $18.8 million in the United States and Canada and $30.3 million in other territories, for a worldwide total of $49.1 million.

In the United States and Canada, Tarot was released alongside The Fall Guy, and was projected to gross $5–6 million from 3,104 theaters in its opening weekend. The film made $2.5 million on its first day, including $715,000 from preview screenings. It went on to debut at $6.3 million, finishing in fourth. The film made $3.4 million in its second weekend (a drop of 47.7%) and $2 million in its third, finishing in fourth and seventh place, respectively. The film is considered a box office success.

=== Critical response ===
On the review aggregator website Rotten Tomatoes, 17% of 63 critics' reviews are positive, with an average rating of 4.20/10. The website's consensus reads: "Reshuffling well-worn tropes to dismaying effect, Tarot's fate is decidedly dour." Metacritic, which uses a weighted average, assigned the film a score of 36 out of 100, based on 12 critics, indicating "generally unfavorable" reviews. Audiences polled by CinemaScore gave the film an average grade of "C–" on an A+ to F scale, while those polled by PostTrak gave it a 59% overall positive score.

Benjamin Lee of The Guardian gave the film 2/5 stars, writing, "Flashes of competence are not enough to distract from a sense of crushing pointlessness, more watery slop served up lukewarm for undemanding Friday night horror fans, who really ought to be demanding so much more." Variety's Todd Gilchrist said the film "repeatedly leverages the genre's laziest mood-setting and suspense-building devices to keep its audience on the edge of their seats." IGN's Jesse Hassenger gave it 2/10 stars, saying, "Tarot seems perpetually uncertain about whether it should play its thinly conceived premise for laughs, or actually pursue real scares. It winds up with neither, stumbling around in the dark and turning its small ensemble into a crude means of timekeeping for its surprisingly sluggish 90-minute runtime."

Alison Foreman of IndieWire gave the film a B grade, writing, "Cohen and Halberg manage an admirable faith in their own movie -- delivering consistently delightful kills in a soapy story that doesn't seem insecure until the very end."

== Accolades ==
Felicity Abbott won the Docklands Studios Melbourne Award for Best Production Design at the 2025 ADPG Awards for her work on the film.
