= Larsen Thompson =

American actress, dancer and model

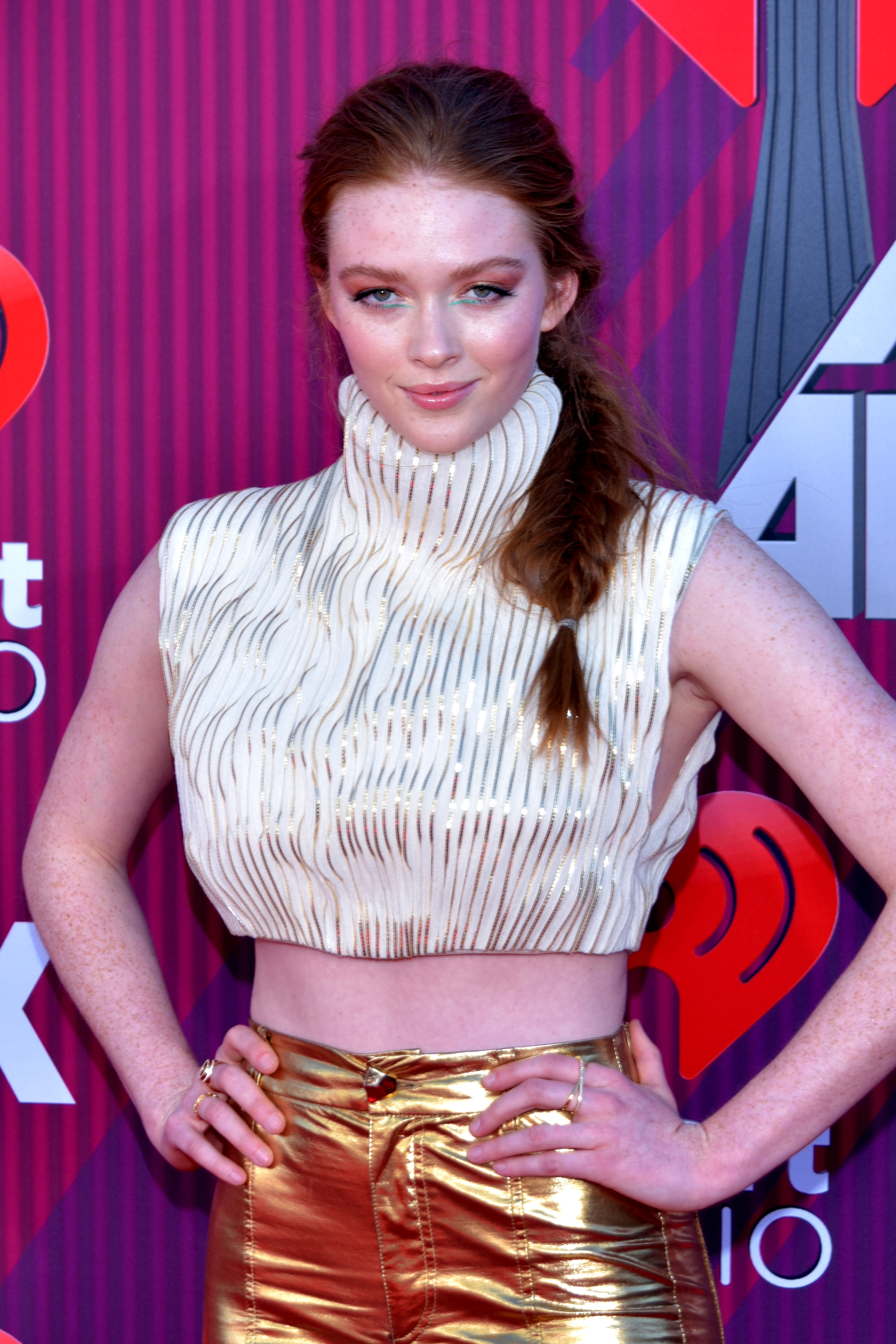
- Thompson at the 2019 iHeartRadio Music Awards in Los Angeles California on March 14, 2019
- Born: November 19, 2000 (age 25); Thousand Oaks, California, U.S.
- Occupations: Actress; dancer; model
- Years active: 2010–present
- Height: 1.70 m (5 ft 7 in)
- Website: LarsenThompson.com

Larsen Thompson (born November 19, 2000) is an American actress, model, and dancer. She portrayed Pearl in the 2020 film of the same name.

== Early life ==
Thompson began dancing at an early age when she was 4. At age 9, she was training in hip-hop, tap, contemporary, and ballet. At 12, she began traveling to international dance conventions.

== Career ==
In 2013, she signed with Zuri Models children's talent agency. She appeared as a dancer/actor in shows, such as America's Got Talent, Disney Awards for Florida, 2013 Teen Choice Awards with Christina Aguilera and Pitbull, Nickelodeon’s The Fresh Beat Band, The Voice, and X-factor.

At age 15, Thompson got her first big break when her choreographed YouTube video 'IDFWU' went viral, receiving over 4 million views in 2016. Later that year, her choreographed YouTube video for 'Run The World' also went viral, receiving over 8 million views. Thompson also appeared in Sia's music video for The Greatest, and Børns' track American Money in 2016.

In 2017, Thompson was featured in an official dance video for P!nk's "Beautiful Trauma", and Katy Perry's video in "Chained to the Rhythm".

In 2018, Thompson collaborated with Marc Jacobs for the brand's fragrance Friends of Daisy. Her debut feature film Bloodline with Seann William Scott by Blum House Productions was released in September 2018.

Thompson has modeled for Betsey Johnson, Dior, Fendi, Juicy Couture, Superga, Target, Puma, Gap, Hollister, and others.

She has appeared as a backup dancer for artists, including Børns, Christina Aguilera, Janet Jackson, Katy Perry, P!nk, Sia, Silento, and more. She has also danced alongside Janet Jackson while on her Unbreakable Tour in Southern California, as well as dancing in commercials for Macy's, the Troll's movie with Betsey Johnson, Vogue Italia x Gucci, and others.

== Personal life ==
Thompson started dating The Summer I Turned Pretty actor Gavin Casalegno in 2016, but they quietly broke up on harmonious terms in 2022, according to sources close to the former couple.

== Filmography ==
Film and television roles
Year	Title	Role	Notes
2010	I Am	Daughter	
2011	The Fresh Beat Band	Dancer	Episode: "Keeping It Green"
2013	Shake It Up	Dancer	Episode: "Opposites Attract It Up"
2015	Love Is Blindness	Watching Teenager	Short film
2016	Desierto Y Larson	Larsen	Short film
2018	Bloodline	Kelly	
2019	Boléro	Maya	Short film
2020	The SpongeBob Movie: Sponge on the Run	Dancer	
2020	Pearl	Pearl	
2022	The Midnight Club	Julia Jayne	2 episodes
2023	American Cherry	Sasha	
2024	Tarot	Elise	

=== Music videos ===
Year	Title	Artist	Role	Ref(s)
2016	"The Greatest"	Sia	Dancer	
2017	"Beautiful Trauma"	P!nk	Beautiful	
