= Scarlett Mack =

Irish/Scottish actress (born 1989)

- Born: 5 June 1989 (age 37); Belfast, Northern Ireland
- Education: B.A in French from Lancaster University diplome
- Occupation: Actress

Scarlett Mack (born 5 June 1989) is an Irish/Scottish actress, best known for her role as Amy McConachie in the film Blackbird.

== Early life and education ==
Mack was born in Belfast, Northern Ireland; she moved to Fife at the age of three, where she lived until she was 17. She completed a BA in Contemporary Theatre at the Lancaster Institute of Contemporary Art, and also earned a BA in French from Lancaster University, taking a year to study in Lyon to attain fluency in French and her DEUF diplome.

She then applied to the Royal Conservatoire of Scotland, formerly the Royal Scottish Academy of Music and Drama, was accepted and awarded a full scholarship. She graduated in July 2013.

== Career in theatre ==
Mack acted in several theatrical productions, including Eight, Possibilities and The Play That Killed Me at the Tron Theatre in Glasgow. She amused audiences in her role as the housemaid in Blithe Spirit at the Perth Theatre.

In 2015 Mack performed a lead role in the play The Effect, by Lucy Prebble, at the Tron Theatre.

== Career in film and television ==
In 2013, Mack performed the role of Amy in the film Blackbird, which premiered at the Edmonton International Film Festival and was nominated for the Michael Powell Best British Film Award at that festival. It was also nominated for the Best Film Audience Award at the Scottish BAFTAs 2013.

Mack acts the ongoing role of Louise Poise in the comedy series Rab C. Nesbitt, and can be seen in an advertisement for Tunnock's Caramel Wafer.
