= Brian McCardie =

Scottish actor and writer (1965–2024)

- McCardie in 2014
- Born: 22 January 1965; Glasgow, Scotland
- Died: 28 April 2024 (aged 59); Glasgow, Scotland
- Occupations: Actor; writer
- Years active: 1989–2024

Brian McCardie (22 January 1965 – 28 April 2024) was a Scottish actor and writer, known for his role as John Thomas "Tommy" Hunter in the BBC police procedural series Line of Duty.

== Early life and education ==
Brian McCardie was born on 22 January 1965 in Glasgow, Scotland.

He attended St. Brendan's, then St. Athanasius Primary Schools before going on to attend Our Lady's High School in Motherwell, North Lanarkshire. His parents moved from Motherwell to Carluke, South Lanarkshire while he was at school, and he developed an interest in theatre, starring in a production of the musical Godspell with a local drama group consisting of youngsters from local schools.

== Career ==
McCardie began his career in 1989, appearing in an episode of EastEnders as Seb. In 1990, he appeared in the television film Forget About Me as Bunny, before going on to appear in Waterfront Beat between 1990 and 1991 as PC Ronnie Barker. He portrayed Alasdair, alongside Liam Neeson in 1995's blockbuster, Rob Roy.

McCardie portrayed organised crime boss John Thomas "Tommy" Hunter in Line of Duty between 2012 and 2014. He also appeared in the BBC One three-part drama Time in 2021, as Jackson Jones, written by Jimmy McGovern, directed by Lewis Arnold and starring Stephen Graham and Sean Bean. He also appeared in Sky Atlantic's Domina, set in Ancient Rome, playing Cicero. He performed his self-penned one-man play Connolly about James Connolly at the Lyric Theatre, Belfast.

McCardie performed readings of his own poems at various venues around Ireland and was filming them for distribution online.

McCardie’s final screen role was as Isaac Grant in Outlander: Blood of My Blood. Episode four, his final filmed appearance, was dedicated to his memory.

== Death ==
McCardie died as a result of an aortic dissection on 28 April 2024, at the age of 59.

== Selected filmography ==
=== TV series ===
Year	Series	Role
1990	Forget About Me	Bunny
1990-1991	Waterfront Beat	PC Ronnie Barker
1991	Tonight at 8.30	Bill – 1st Soldier
1991	Murder Most Horrid	Supermarket Assistant
1993	Doctor Finlay	Archie Henderson
1994-2010	Taggart	Thomas Keenan / Fisher / Martin McLean / Alex Currie
1999	Kavanagh QC	Philip Boxer
2004	The Bill	Taffy Saunders
2006	Murphy's Law	Billy Johnstone
2006	Low Winter Sun	Det. Con Joe Geddes
2007	Lilies	Dadda Moss
2007	The Whistleblowers	Tim Robey
2007	Rebus	Brian Robertson
2008	Shameless	Paddy McGrath
2008	Kiss of Death	Michael Bovery
2008	Heroes and Villains	Hernán Cortés
2010	Thorne: Sleepyhead	Frank Calvert
2010	Accused	DI Warren
2011	Case Histories	Terence Smith
2012	Titanic	First Officer Murdoch
2012	Vexed	Robert Randell
2012-2014	Line of Duty	Tommy / John Thomas Hunter
2013	The Crash	Charlie Harris
2013	MI High	Mr. McNab
2015	The Musketeers	Sebastian Lemaitre
2015	Holby City	Archie Pugh
2015	Outlander	Sir Marcus MacRannoch
2016	Snatch	Uncle Dean
2016	Rebellion	James Connolly
2017	Fortitude 2	Lazlo Hindemith
2018	Ordeal by Innocence	Bellamy Gould
2018	Moscow Noir	Lord Pendergast
2019	Giri/Haji	Jack
2019	Last of The Czars	Prime Minister Pyotr Stolypin
2019	Charles lst	Sir John Pym
2021	Domina	Cicero
2021	Time	Jackson Jones
2023	Six Four	Bill Martin
2023	The Long Shadow	Steve
2023	Murder is Easy	
2023	Dog Days	
2023	The Tower	Ray Walker
2025	Outlander: Blood of My Blood	Isaac Grant

=== Films ===
Year	Series	Role
1995	Dirty Old Town	Vic Leigh
1995	Rob Roy	Alasdair McGregor
1995	Kidnapped	David Balfour
1996	The Ghost and the Darkness	Angus Starling
1997	Speed 2: Cruise Control	Merced
1999	200 Cigarettes	Eric
1999	Rituals and Resolutions (short)	Will
2001	Beyond the City Limits	Sergei Akotia
2003	Mr. Barrington	Mr Barrington
2003	Solid Air	Robert Houston Junior
2005	Ellie Parker	Acting Student
2009	The Damned United	Dave Mackay
2009	Wasted	Party Host
2009	Seaside Stories	Dr Forbes
2010	Soulboy	Fish-shop Bobby
2010	Anywhere But Here	Peter McBride
2012	Doors Open	Charlie Calloway
2013	For Those in Peril	Dr Forbes
2013	The Groundsman (short)	Steve
2013	Filth	Dougie Gillman
2014	Ghosts	Jacob Engstrand
2014	Peterman	Bill
2014	Wasted Time	Danny
2015	Dropping Off Michael	Duncan
2016	Scarlet (short)	Fisherman
2016	The Job	Geoff
2017	Come Out of the Woods (short)	PC Brian Cassidy
2018	Walk Like a Panther	Ziggy Barrow
2018	Agatha and the Truth of Murder	Sir Hugh Persimmion
2019	Our Ladies	Police Sergeant
2023	Mia and The Dragon Princess	Skipper Matthews
2024	Damaged	Avery Thompson

=== Voice actor ===
- The Witcher 2 (2011, Video Game) – (English version, voice)
- The Ripper (2011, Computer Game) – The Reverend (voice)
