= Outlander: Blood of My Blood =

2025 historical romance drama television series

- Genre: Historical romance drama
- Based on: Characters by Diana Gabaldon
- Developed by: Matthew B. Roberts
- Showrunner: Matthew B. Roberts
- Starring: Harriet Slater; Jamie Roy; Hermione Corfield; Jeremy Irvine; Tony Curran; Séamus McLean Ross; Sam Retford; Rory Alexander; Conor MacNeill; Brian McCardie; Sara Vickers; Simon Merrells; Alastair Mackenzie
- Opening theme: "For My Love That's Lost" by Julie Fowlis
- Composer: Bear McCreary
- Countries of origin: United States; United Kingdom
- Original language: English
- No. of seasons: 2
- No. of episodes: 19

Production
- Executive producers: Matthew B. Roberts; Ronald D. Moore; Maril Davis; Jim Kohlberg; Luke Parker Bowles; Toni Graphia; Luke Schelhaas; Michael Wilson
- Producers: Michael Wilson; Patrick Conroy
- Production location: Scotland
- Cinematography: Alasdair Walker; Peter Robertson; Søren Bay; Neville Kid; Stuart Biddlecombe; Scott Napier
- Editors: Michael O'Halloran; Alanah Jones; Hibah Schweitzer; Leah Tuscano; Amy D'Alessandro; Michelle Grainger; Luke Brown
- Running time: 60–80 minutes
- Production companies: Left Bank Pictures; Story Mining & Supply Co.; Tall Ship Productions; No Fooling Productions; Sony Pictures Television

Original release
- Network: Starz
- Release: August 8, 2025 – present

Related
- Outlander

Outlander: Blood of My Blood is an historical romance drama television series that serves as a prequel to the television series Outlander (2014–2026), which is based on the book series of the same name by Diana Gabaldon.

The series follows the parents of both protagonists from the original series, Jamie Fraser and Claire Beauchamp. Jamie's parents in 18th century Scotland are played by Harriet Slater as Ellen MacKenzie and Jamie Roy as Brian Fraser. Claire's parents in World War I are played by Hermione Corfield as Julia Moriston and Jeremy Irvine as Henry Beauchamp.

Outlander: Blood of My Blood premiered on Starz on August 8, 2025. The first season consists of ten episodes. In June 2025, the series was renewed for a second season ahead of the series premiere on September 18, 2026.

== Premise ==
Outlander: Blood of My Blood is a love story that tells the tales of how the parents of Jamie Fraser came together in 18th century Scotland and how the parents of Claire Beauchamp met during World War I in England. A trailer released in July 2025 also revealed a time travel element involving Claire's parents that appears to intersect with the 18th century timeline.

== Cast ==
=== Main ===
- Harriet Slater as Ellen MacKenzie, Jamie Fraser's mother. Jules Hynd Horne portrays young Ellen MacKenzie in flashbacks in season 2.
- Jamie Roy as Brian Fraser, Jamie's father
- Hermione Corfield as Julia Moriston, Claire Fraser's mother
- Jeremy Irvine as Henry Beauchamp, Claire's father
- Tony Curran as Simon Fraser, Lord Lovat, Brian's father
- Séamus McLean Ross as Colum MacKenzie, Ellen's younger brother and the eldest son of Red Jacob MacKenzie. George Burch portrays young Colum MacKenzie in flashbacks in season 2.
- Sam Retford as Dougal MacKenzie, Ellen and Colum's younger brother and the third child of Red Jacob MacKenzie. Jacob Ferguson portrays young Dougal MacKenzie in flashbacks in season 2.
- Rory Alexander as Murtagh Fitzgibbons Fraser, Brian's best friend and second cousin
- Conor MacNeill as Ned Gowan, secretary at Castle Leoch
- Brian McCardie as Isaac Grant (season 1), laird of Clan Grant and Malcolm Grant's father
- Sara Vickers as Davina Porter, housekeeper at Castle Leathers and Brian Fraser's mother
- Simon Merrells as Malcolm MacKinnon Grant (season 2; recurring season 1), Malcolm Grant's uncle
- Alastair Mackenzie as John Cameron (season 2), Jocasta's husband

=== Recurring ===
- Sally Messham as Mrs Fitzgibbons, head housekeeper of Castle Leoch
- Jhon Lumsden as Malcolm Grant (season 1), Isaac's son and suitor to Ellen
- Terence Rae as Arch Bug, a man of Clan Grant
- Sadhbh Malin as Jocasta MacKenzie Cameron, Ellen's sister and youngest child of Red Jacob
- Ailsa Davidson as Janet MacKenzie (season 1; guest season 2), Ellen's sister
- Rebekah Lumsden as Letitia Chisholm MacKenzie, Colum's wife
- Chick Allan as Balloch, Lord Lovat's brutal right-hand enforcer
- Lauren McQueen as Seema, a prostitute who falls in love with Henry
- Bobby Rainsbury as Maura Grant MacKenzie (season 2; guest season 1), Malcolm's sister and, later, Dougal's wife
- Ruby Fubara as Grace (season 2), a London-born maidservant to the Camerons
- Michael Cooke as Alec MacMahon (season 2; guest season 1), Master of Horse at Castle Leoch
- Katharine O'Donnelly as Maisri, a seer in service of Lord Lovat
- Craig Clelland as Old Rupert MacKenzie (season 2), a warrior of Clan MacKenzie
- Ross Mann as Old Angus MacKenzie (season 2), a warrior of Clan MacKenzie
- Marlow Walters as Wee Angus MacKenzie (season 2; guest season 1), Old Angus's son
- Bryan Dick as Hugh Cameron, John Cameron's cousin
- Digby Edgley as Captain Lord Gerard Grey, Lord John Grey's father

=== Guest ===
- Louis O'Rourke as Wee Rupert MacKenzie
- George Kemp as Quentin Lambert "Uncle Lamb" Beauchamp
- Mae and Tuesday Roberts as Claire Beauchamp

==== Season 1 ====
- Peter Mullan as Red Jacob MacKenzie, the late laird of Castle Leoch. Barry John Kinsella portrays young Red Jacob in flashbacks in season 2.
- Ryan Fletcher as James MacKinney
- Annabelle Dowler as Lizbeth
- Matthew Barker as Captain Lambie
- Harry Eaton as Private William "Willie" Charlton
- Madeline Appiah as Ùna Hay
- Lauren Grace as Morven Grant
- Caolán Downs as Ewan
- Calum Barbour as Tearlach
- Jack Bishop as Lachlan Grant
- Elizabeth Millbank-Turner as Mairead
- Anita Vettesse as Mrs. Baird
- Karen Bartke as Mrs. Mitchell
- Allison McKenzie as Mrs. Hughes
- Gabriel Quigley as Mrs. Stewart
- Karen Fishwick as Ailsa
- Kit Laveri as Mary
- Melissa Collier as Esther
- Molly Jane Graham as Jessica
- Ciara Thomson as Kirstin
- Jessica Donnelly as Patricia
- Claire Cassidy as Geraldine
- Ceit Smith as Kay
- Dom Fraser as Marcus MacRannoch
- Jamie Sives as Rob Roy MacGregor
- Joanne Crawford as Lady Margaret Nairne
- Max Wrottesley as Captain Andrew Fleming
- Andrew John Tait as Davie Beaton
- Craige Els as John Erskine, Earl of Mar
- Stuart McQuarrie as Cluny MacPherson
- Holly Barbour as Hetty

==== Season 2 ====
- Luke Aquilina as Caleb MacKenzie
- Tom Ashley as Rev. Reginald Wakefield
- Emma Hartley-Miller as Mrs. Graham
- Naomi Stirrat as Nurse Wilson
- Alasdair Harvey as Dr. Perryman
- Amro Mahmoud as Firouz
- Macleod Stephen as Robert MacKinney
- Kyle McGuinness as Borland
- Patrick Capaloff-Fowler as Thomson
- Leo MacNeill as Forbes
- Andrew Douglas as Docherty
- Sorcha Groundsell as Murdina Bug
- Finley Glasgow as Jonathan "Jack" Randall
- Lily Travers as Charlotte Seaton
- Erin Shanagher as Margaret Grant
- Bobby Bradley as Lieutenant Bodmin
- Jacob Dudman as the Duke of Sandringham
- Guido Renner as King George I
- Beth Frieden as Sophia von Kielmansegg
- Kareem Nasif as Mehemet
- Zubair Asghar as Mustapha

== Episodes ==
Season	Episodes	Originally released	
Season	Episodes	First released	Last released
1	10	August 8, 2025	October 10, 2025
2	10	September 18, 2026	November 27, 2026

=== Season 1 (2025) ===
No. overall	No. in season	Title	Directed by	Written by	Original release date
1	1	"Providence"	Jamie Payne	Matthew B. Roberts	August 8, 2025
2	2	"S.W.A.K. (Sealed with a Kiss)"	Jamie Payne	Kiersten Van Horne	August 8, 2025
3	3	"School of the Moon"	Jamie Payne	Teleplay by : Margot Ye; Story by : Curtis Kheel and Margot Ye	August 15, 2025
4	4	"A Soldier's Heart"	Emer Conroy	Macy Grace Smolsky	August 22, 2025
5	5	"Needfire"	Emer Conroy	Taylor Mallory	August 29, 2025
6	6	"Birthright"	Matthew Moore	Danielle Berrow	September 5, 2025
7	7	"Luceo Non Uro"	Matthew Moore	Margot Ye	September 12, 2025
8	8	"A Virtuous Woman"	Azhur Saleem	Kiersten Van Horne	September 19, 2025
9	9	"Braemar"	Azhur Saleem	Diana Gabaldon	September 26, 2025
10	10	"Something Borrowed"	Azhur Saleem	Diana Gabaldon & Matthew B. Roberts	October 10, 2025

=== Season 2 (2026) ===
No. overall	No. in season	Title	Directed by	Written by	Original release date
11	1	"Remembrance Day"	Azhur Saleem	Danielle Berrow	September 18, 2026
12	2	"The Veil of Time"	Emer Conroy	Margot Ye	September 25, 2026
13	3	"Rabbits Don't Swim"	Azhur Saleem	Toni Graphia	October 2, 2026
14	4	"A Portion of My Soul"	Emer Conroy	Sarah H. Haught	October 9, 2026
15	5	"Forgive Me, Father"	Emer Conroy	Luke Schelhaas	October 16, 2026
16	6	"Small Mercies"	Azhur Saleem	Taylor Mallory	October 23, 2026
17	7	"Heart of the Highlands"	Azhur Saleem	Luke Schelhaas & Sarah H. Haught	October 30, 2026
18	8	"The Dance"	Azhur Saleem	Toni Graphia & Danielle Berrow	November 6, 2026
19	9	"Another Man's Shadow"	Emer Conroy	Diana Gabaldon	November 20, 2026
20	10	"Twelfth Night"	TBA	Matthew B. Roberts	November 27, 2026

== Production ==
=== Development ===
A prequel series was reported in February 2022 to be in development, written and executive produced by Outlander showrunner / executive producer Matthew B. Roberts. In May 2022, executive producer Maril Davis confirmed that the series would focus on the parents of Jamie Fraser. In August 2022, it was confirmed that the prequel series will be titled Blood of My Blood. In January 2023, Starz ordered a 10-episode first season. Once production started in February 2024, it was confirmed that the series would also focus on Claire's parents. Gabaldon has said the prequel series is based in part on material she had written for the first of three potential books about Jamie's parents, who were the focus of Roberts's first conception of the new series. He later came up with the time travel element involving Claire's parents that would connect the two storylines in the series. Gabaldon had said she was not interested herself in the story of Claire's parents, but was receptive to the ideas pitched by the TV writers. In June 2025, the series was renewed for a second season, ahead of the show's premiere.

=== Casting ===
In February 2024, the first casting announcements revealed that Harriet Slater, Jamie Roy, Hermione Corfield, and Jeremy Irvine were cast as the future parents of Jamie and Claire, respectively. Tony Curran was also cast as Lord Lovat, Jamie's grandfather. Then Rory Alexander, Sam Retford, Séamus McLean Ross, and Conor MacNeill were cast as younger versions of characters from the original Outlander series. Brian McCardie, Jhon Lumsden, Sara Vickers, and Peter Mullan were added to the cast at the beginning of April. Sally Messham, Terence Rae, Ailsa Davidson, Sadhbh Malin, Annabelle Dowler, and Harry Eaton rounded out the cast at the end of the month.

=== Filming ===
==== Season 1 ====
Filming began in January 2024 in Glasgow, Scotland, but production had to be put on hold due to storms in the area, and filming resumed at the end of February. Part of the filming was also done on location at Doune Castle, serving as Castle Leoch. On July 19, 2024, Starz announced on social media that filming had wrapped.

==== Season 2 ====
By June 2025, production was underway on the second season in Scotland. On December 18, 2025, Starz announced on its social media that filming for season two had wrapped.

== Release ==
Outlander: Blood of My Blood premiered on August 8, 2025. The second season premiered on September 18, 2026.

== Reception ==
On the review aggregator website Rotten Tomatoes, the first season has an approval rating of 91% based on 22 critics' reviews. The website's critics consensus is, "Tapping into a rich vein of romance and swashbuckling adventure, Blood of My Blood is a swoon-worthy spinoff that exemplifies the original Outlander's best qualities." Metacritic, which uses a weighted average, assigned a score of 70 out of 100, based on 15 critics, indicating "generally favorable" reviews.
