= Sadhbh Malin =

Irish actress

- Born: Ireland
- Occupations: Actress, writer
- Years active: 2014–present
- Known for: Outlander: Blood of My Blood

Sadhbh Malin is an Irish actress and writer from Dún Laoghaire, Dublin. She is known for her work in theatre, television, and film, including her roles in Love, Rosie (2014), Conversations with Friends (2022), and as Jocasta Cameron in Outlander: Blood of My Blood (2025).

== Early life and education ==
Malin was educated at St. Conleth's College in Ballsbridge and Newpark Comprehensive School in Blackrock before training in acting at The Lir Academy in Dublin, completing the three-year BA (Hons) programme from 2017 to 2020.

== Career ==
=== Theatre ===
Malin co-founded the female-led theatre company Philomena P with Sinéad Gallagher. Together, they created the play in heat, which premiered at The New Theatre during the 2023 Dublin Fringe Festival.

=== Film and television ===
Malin made her film debut in 2014 in Love, Rosie, playing the role of Clare.

She later appeared in short films (2017, 2021, 2023) and in 2022 portrayed Camille in the television adaptation of Sally Rooney's novel Conversations with Friends.

In 2025, Malin was cast as Jocasta Cameron in the Outlander: Blood of My Blood prequel series, portraying the youngest sibling of Ellen MacKenzie.

== Name ==
Her given name, Sadhbh, is pronounced "Sive".

== Selected filmography ==
Year	Title	Role	Notes
2014	Love, Rosie	Clare	Film
2022	Conversations with Friends	Camille	TV series
2025	Outlander: Blood of My Blood	Jocasta Cameron	TV series
