= Harriet Slater (actress) =

British actress (born 1994)

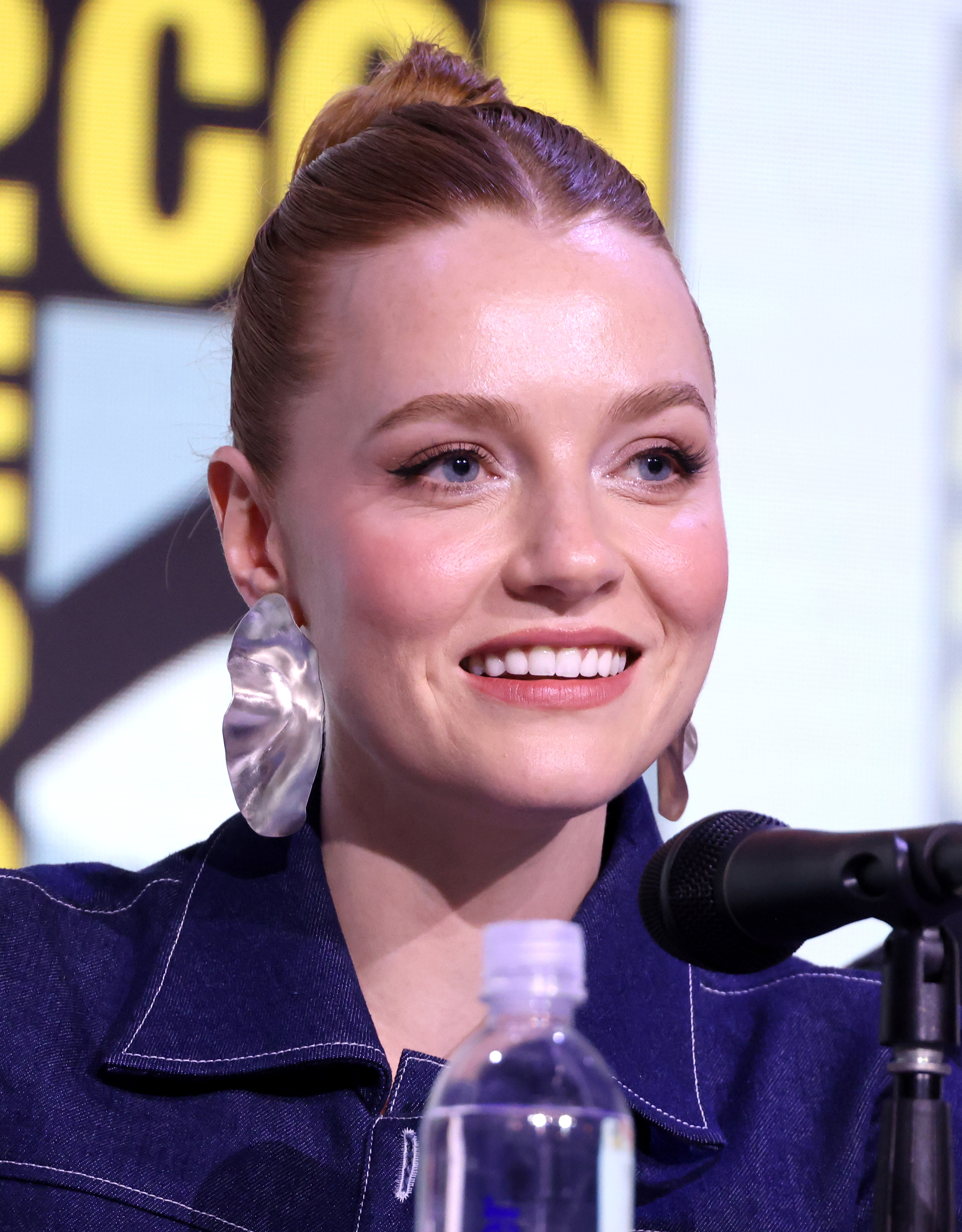
- Slater in 2025
- Born: Harriet Marston Slater; 18 February 1994 (age 32); Leicester, England
- Education: Guildford School of Acting
- Occupation: Actress
- Years active: 2016–present

Harriet Marston Slater (born 18 February 1994) is an English actress. On television, she is known for her roles in the DC Universe series Pennyworth (2019–2022), the MGM+ period drama Belgravia: The Next Chapter (2024) and the Starz prequel Outlander: Blood of My Blood (2025). She was named a 2023 Bright Young Thing by Tatler.

== Early life ==
Harriet Marston Slater was born on 18 February 1994 in Leicester, England, and raised there. Her extended family were active in amateur dramatics. She joined a local youth theatre group, the Little Theatre, at six. She found acting a stress-reliever for anxiety. Slater has mentioned Lindsay Lohan and Jane Fonda as inspirations. She graduated with a Bachelor of Arts in Acting from the Guildford School of Acting in 2016.

== Career ==
After graduating from drama school, Slater began her career in regional theatre, making her professional debut in The Man with the Hammer at the Theatre Royal, Plymouth in 2016. She next appeared in the Royal Shakespeare Company production of Phil Porter's Vice Versa at the Swan Theatre in 2017. She also appeared in The Secret Seven at Storyhouse.

Slater made her television debut when she was cast as Sandra Onslow in the DC Universe series and Batman prequel Pennyworth, which premiered on Epix in 2019. After playing a recurring character during the first season, she joined the main cast for the subsequent two seasons. She made her feature film debut in the 2020 indie fantasy film Emily and the Magical Journey. In 2023, she had a small role in Indiana Jones and the Dial of Destiny.

In 2024, Slater starred as Clara Trenchard (née Dunn) in Helen Edmundson's period drama Belgravia: The Next Chapter for MGM+. In February 2024, it was announced that she had been cast as Ellen MacKenzie in the Outlander prequel series Outlander: Blood of My Blood. She appeared in the films Tarot (also known as Horrorscope) and True Haunting.

== Personal life ==
As of 2023, Slater is in a relationship.

== Filmography ==
=== Film ===
Year	Title	Role	Notes
2020	Emily and the Magical Journey	Kayla	
2023	Indiana Jones and the Dial of Destiny	Fran	
2024	Tarot	Haley	
2026	Fall 2: Deadpoint	Jax Hunter	

=== Television ===
Year	Title	Role	Notes
2019–2022	Pennyworth	Sandra Onslow	Recurring role (season 1); main role (seasons 2–3)
2020	All Creatures Great and Small	Brenda	Episode: "A Cure for All Ills"
2024	Belgravia: The Next Chapter	Clara Dunn / Clara Trenchard	Main role
2025	Outlander: Blood of My Blood	Ellen MacKenzie	Main role

== Stage ==
Year	Title	Role	Notes
2016	The Man with the Hammer	Jodie	Theatre Royal, Plymouth
2017	Vice Versa	Meretrix / Voluptua (understudy)	Swan Theatre, Stratford-upon-Avon
2017	The Secret Seven	Janet	Storyhouse, Chester
