= Jamie Roy =

Scottish actor

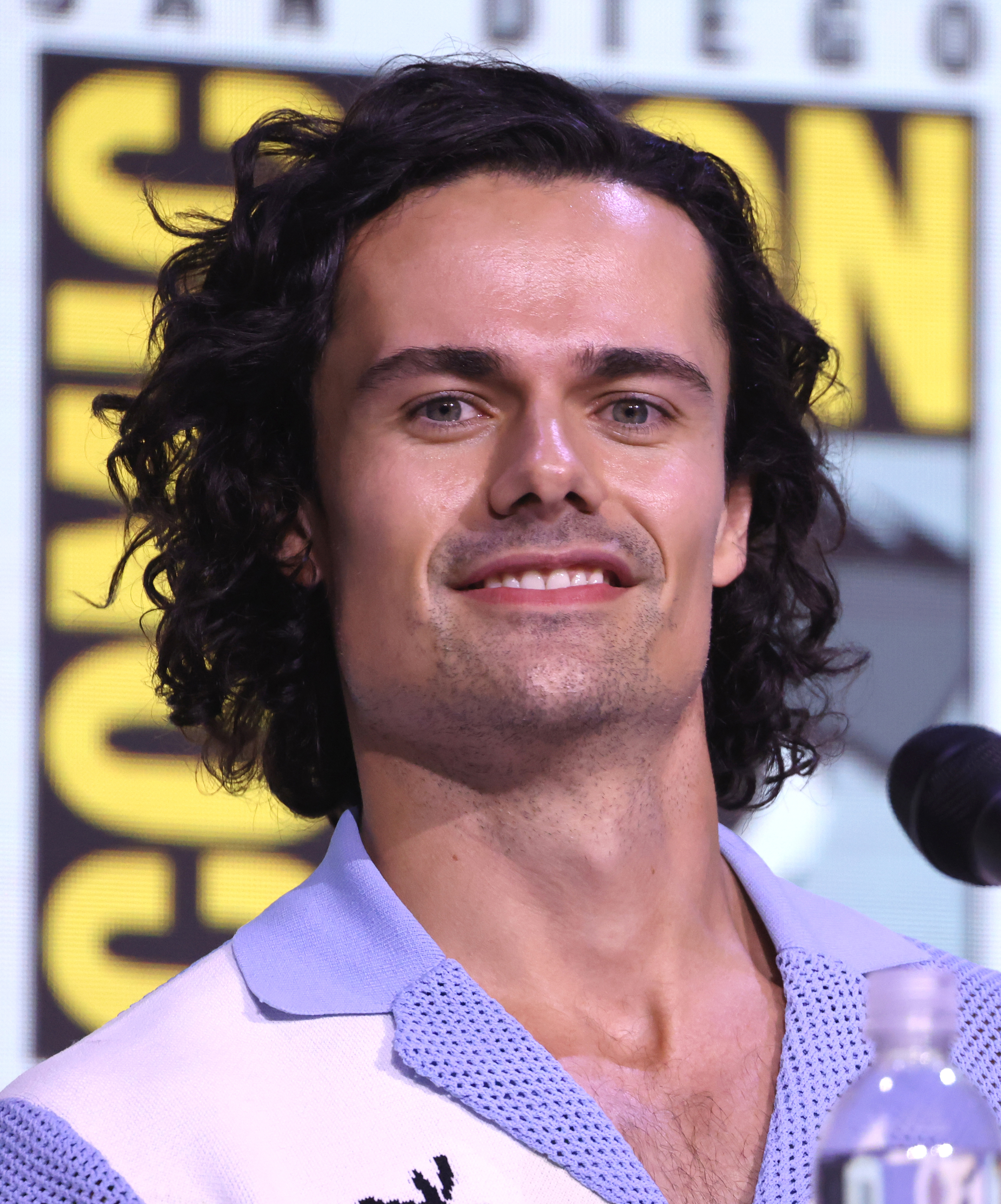
- Roy in 2025
- Born: Jamie Brian Roy; 22 April 1993 (age 33); Greenock, Scotland
- Education: Strathclyde University
- Occupation: Actor
- Years active: 2018-present
- Height: 6 ft 1 in (1.85 m)

Jamie Brian Roy is a Scottish actor. He is best known for his role in the Starz historical romance drama Outlander: Blood of My Blood.

== Early life and education ==
Jamie Brian Roy was born on 22 April 1993 in Greenock, Scotland. He lived there for three months before moving with his mother to Lenzie, a town outside Glasgow, where he was raised. He later lived in the west end of Glasgow.

He graduated from the Strathclyde Business School in Glasgow. He took acting classes in Govan and later studied at the New York Film Academy in Miami.

== Career ==
Roy turned down a management consultancy job in the US to pursue acting. He worked at Walt Disney World for three years, performing as Kristoff from Frozen, before moving to Los Angeles, where he picked up small television roles.

Roy had roles in the television films Your Boyfriend is Mine, Flowers and Honey, Burning Little Lies, and Picture Perfect Lies. He also starred in Squeaky Clean Mysteries: Hazardous Duty and Condor's Nest. Roy had not worked for two years before booking his breakout role as Brian Fraser in Outlander: Blood of My Blood. He had previously auditioned for Outlander twice without success.

== Personal life ==
Roy has been in a relationship with American actress Annika Foster since 2021.

He is an ambassador for the Scottish SPCA.
