= Anael (disambiguation) =

Anael is an alternative name for the angel or archangel Haniel.

Anael may also refer to:

- Anael (Book of Tobit), person in scripture
- Anael (Kushiel's Legacy), character in fantasy novel series
