= Kushiel =

Punitive angel in Judeo-Christian folklore

In Judeo-Christian folklore the angel Kushiel, meaning "Rigid One of God", punishes individuals in Hell.

== In Hebrew writings ==
Kushiel is one of seven angels of punishment along with Hutriel, Lahatiel, Makatiel, Puriel (also written Pusiel), Rogziel and Shoftiel.

As a "presiding angel of Hell," he is said to punish nations with a whip made of fire, although, along with the other angels of punishment, is reported in Second Book of Enoch 10:3 to dwell in the third heaven.

== In popular culture ==
In 2001, Kushiel first appeared as a character in Jacqueline Carey's series of novels entitled Kushiel's Legacy. Kushiel was the punishing angel of the Yeshuites' One God

== See also ==
- Jewish angelic hierarchy
- List of angels in theology
- Zabaniyya
