= God-slayer (disambiguation) =

A god-slayer is one who slays gods.

God-slayer may also refer to:

- God Slayer, a 1990 video game
- The God Slayer, a 2027 video game
- Godslayer, a novel by Jacqueline Carey
- Spawn: Godslayer, a comic book series
- "Godslayer", a song by White Zombie from the album Make Them Die Slowly
