= The Sundering (disambiguation) =

The Sundering may refer to:

- The Sundering (Dungeons & Dragons), a fictional event set in the Forgotten Realms
- The Sundering (novel), a novel by Walter Jon Williams
- The Sundering (series), a series of novels by Jacqueline Carey
- "The Sundering", a song by the Sword from the album Gods of the Earth
