= You Might Be the Killer =

2018 film directed by Brett Simmons

- Directed by: Brett Simmons
- Written by: Covis Berzoyne; Thomas P. Vitale; Brett Simmons
- Story by: Chuck Wendig; Sam Sykes
- Produced by: Griff Furst; Thomas P. Vitale; Brett Simmons; Isaiah LaBorde
- Starring: Fran Kranz; Alyson Hannigan; Brittany S. Hall; Patrick Reginald Walker; Keith David; Bryan Price
- Cinematography: Andrew Strahorn
- Edited by: Stephen Pfeil
- Music by: Andrew Morgan Smith
- Production companies: Curmudgeon Films; Vital Signs Entertainment
- Distributed by: Screen Media Ventures
- Release dates: September 21, 2018 (Fantastic Fest); December 4, 2018 (United States)

You Might Be the Killer is a 2018 American supernatural slasher film directed by Brett Simmons and written by Covis Berzoyne, Thomas P. Vitale, and Simmons, based on an idea by Chuck Wendig and Sam Sykes. The film stars Fran Kranz and Alyson Hannigan, and features Brittany S. Hall, Patrick Reginald Walker, Keith David, and Bryan Price in supporting roles.

== Plot ==
At Camp Clear Vista, panicked lead counselor Sam hides in a cabin and calls his friend Chuck, a horror movie enthusiast, and explains that a masked murderer is roaming the campgrounds. Asked for more details, Sam begins recounting his first day at the camp with fellow counselors and several friends, including his ex-girlfriend Imani.

While on the phone with Chuck, Sam momentarily blacks out and wakes up to the cabin on fire. Sam escapes, briefly spotting the masked killer, and finds a new hiding spot. With Chuck's help, Sam recalls more events.

After discovering several dead bodies, the group found themselves trapped at the camp. While patrolling the woods for the killer, Sam stumbled upon Freddie and Nancy, who for some reason could not hear him. As he witnessed the killer slaughtering them, Sam suffered a blackout.

As Sam is covered in blood, has the killer's weapon as well as a mysterious wooden mask, Sam and Chuck conclude that Sam may be the killer. His blackouts were moments where the "killer" personality took over. After Sam makes several unsuccessful attempts to destroy the mask, Chuck theorizes that the mask may have imprinted on him. Fearful that the surviving counselors are going to kill him, Sam goes back into hiding. Chuck asks Sam to remember how everything started.

After flashing back to several kills, Sam recalls telling the story of the mask's origin, which happened right at the campground many years ago. The origin of the mask dated back to the early day of colonization of European settlers when a group of Cajun people migrated to the land, bringing their dark magic with them. The Cajun black magic went awry and unleashed a dark entity that possessed people and made them massacre each other until a powerful sorcerer sealed the entity in an oak tree. Centuries later, a woodcarver crafted a mask from a tree containing a dark spirit. Influenced by the mask, the carver murdered many people until he himself was killed by a young woman. He was buried along with the mask. The bored group start to look for the grave.

One of his friends, Drew, tricked Sam into revealing the woodcarver's grave. Drew uncovered the mask and, when warned not to wear it, put it on Sam as a joke. A possessed Sam recovered the woodcarver's weapon and killed Drew.

Sam recalls more murders, concluding with the last kill involving throwing Imani into a spike pit. Sam's feelings for Imani allows him to take off the mask. Keeping track of the kills, Chuck advises Sam to be aware of Jamie, who might be the Final Girl.

A supernatural compulsion causes Sam to don the mask again and kill Brad. Imani emerges from the spike pit, having faked her death, to regroup with Jamie. The two knock the mask off Sam and lock him in a shed. Chuck explains the Final Girl concept to the two remaining women.

Despite their efforts to keep the mask away, Sam wears it once more and breaks out of the shed, prompting Imani and Jamie to run. Believing she will survive as the Final Girl, Imani tries to kill Jamie, but Jamie kills her instead. Chuck tells Jamie that she needs to kill Sam at the woodcarver's grave because it is the place of power.

Managing to tear off the mask, Sam heads to the gravesite. Seeing Jamie, Sam convinces her that they both can survive if they stop the curse by burying the mask. Jamie agrees, but becomes compelled to wear the mask when she touches it. Wearing the mask, Jamie stabs Sam with the woodcarver's blade, killing him. She then walks off with the mask.

Two years later Chuck receives a call from a panicked Sam, having become undead.

== Cast ==
- Fran Kranz as Sam Wescott
- Alyson Hannigan as Chuck
- Brittany S. Hall as Imani
- Jenna Harvey as Jamie
- Bryan Price as Steve "The Kayak King"
- Patrick Reginald Walker as Brad
- Jack Murillo as Freddie
- Catt Bellamy as Drew
- Savannah DesOrmeaux as Nancy
- Carol Jean Wells as Heather
- Peter Jaymes as Bob
- Olivia Brown as Carol
- Jesse Gallegos as Ted
- Clara Chong as Alice
- Isaiah LaBorde as the Wood Carver
- Keith David as Sheriff James (voice)

Co-writer and producer Thomas P. Vitale appears as a Rings of Saturn customer.

== Production ==
The concept for the film originated in July 2017 between the banter of two writers, Sam Sykes and Chuck Wendig, on Twitter, where they had been discussing the tropes of a typical slasher film. The idea was then developed into a film to be directed by Brett Simmons, with Sykes and Wendig involved as producers.

Filming was underway in Louisiana by May 2018.

== Release and reception ==
The film debuted at the 2018 Fantastic Fest, and screened at the Toronto After Dark Film Festival as well as about 15 other festivals in the U.S. and around the world. On December 6, 2018 it was released on Shudder before being released on DVD and Blu-ray on February 5, 2019.

On review aggregator Rotten Tomatoes, the film holds an approval rating of 60% based on 20 reviews, with an average rating of 5.4/10.
