= Phoenix Fan Fusion =

Speculative fiction convention

Coordinates: 33.4°N 112.1°W

- Status: Active
- Genre: Speculative fiction
- Venue: Phoenix Convention Center
- Location: Phoenix, Arizona
- Country: United States
- Inaugurated: 2002; 22 years ago
- Attendance: 130,145 in 2025
- Organizer: Square Egg Entertainment
- Website: phoenixfanfusion.com

Phoenix Fan Fusion (formerly Phoenix Comicon and Phoenix Comic Fest) is a speculative fiction entertainment and comic book convention held annually in Phoenix, Arizona. It was founded as the Phoenix Cactus Comicon in June 2002, and originally consisted of a one-day six-hour event held in Ahwatukee, Arizona. The convention plays host to comic related panels, programming events, art contests, and autograph signings for all ages. It is a three-day event (Friday-Sunday) held during the summer at the Phoenix Convention Center in downtown Phoenix. On Thursday evening prior to the official opening of the event, there is a preview for professionals, exhibitors, and select guests pre-registered for all three days.

Originally showcasing comic books, science fiction/fantasy and film/television, and related popular arts, the convention has expanded over the years to include a larger range of pop culture elements, such as horror, anime, manga, animation, toys, collectible card games, video games, webcomics, and fantasy novels. In 2016, the convention set an attendance record of 106,096, and reportedly generates approximately $5 million in revenue for the city of Phoenix. Then-Phoenix Comicon also began to expand programming into the surrounding hotels starting in 2013, including the Hyatt Regency, Marriott Renaissance and Sheraton Phoenix Downtown Hotels.

== History and organization ==
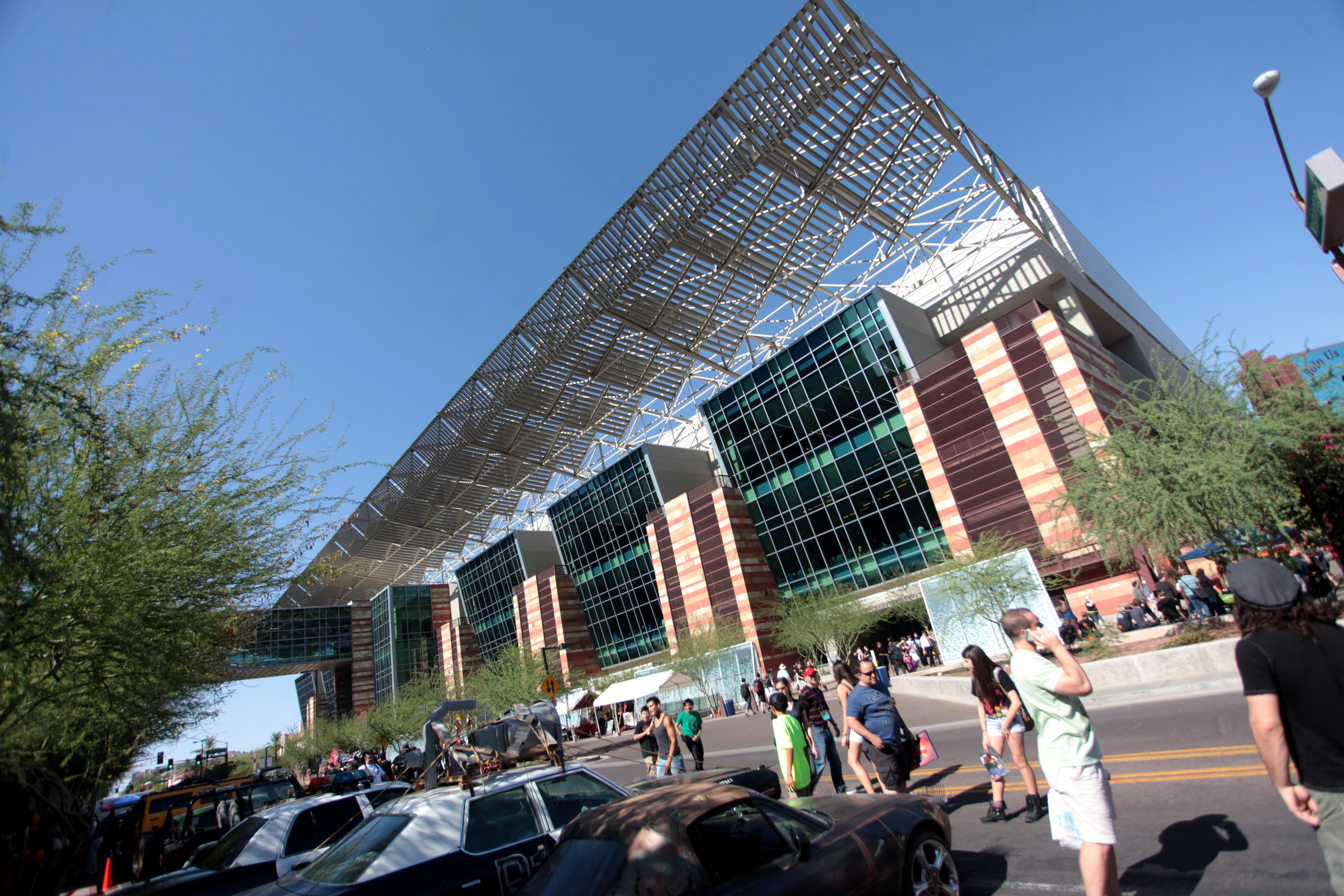
The Phoenix Convention Center has hosted the annual convention since 2010.

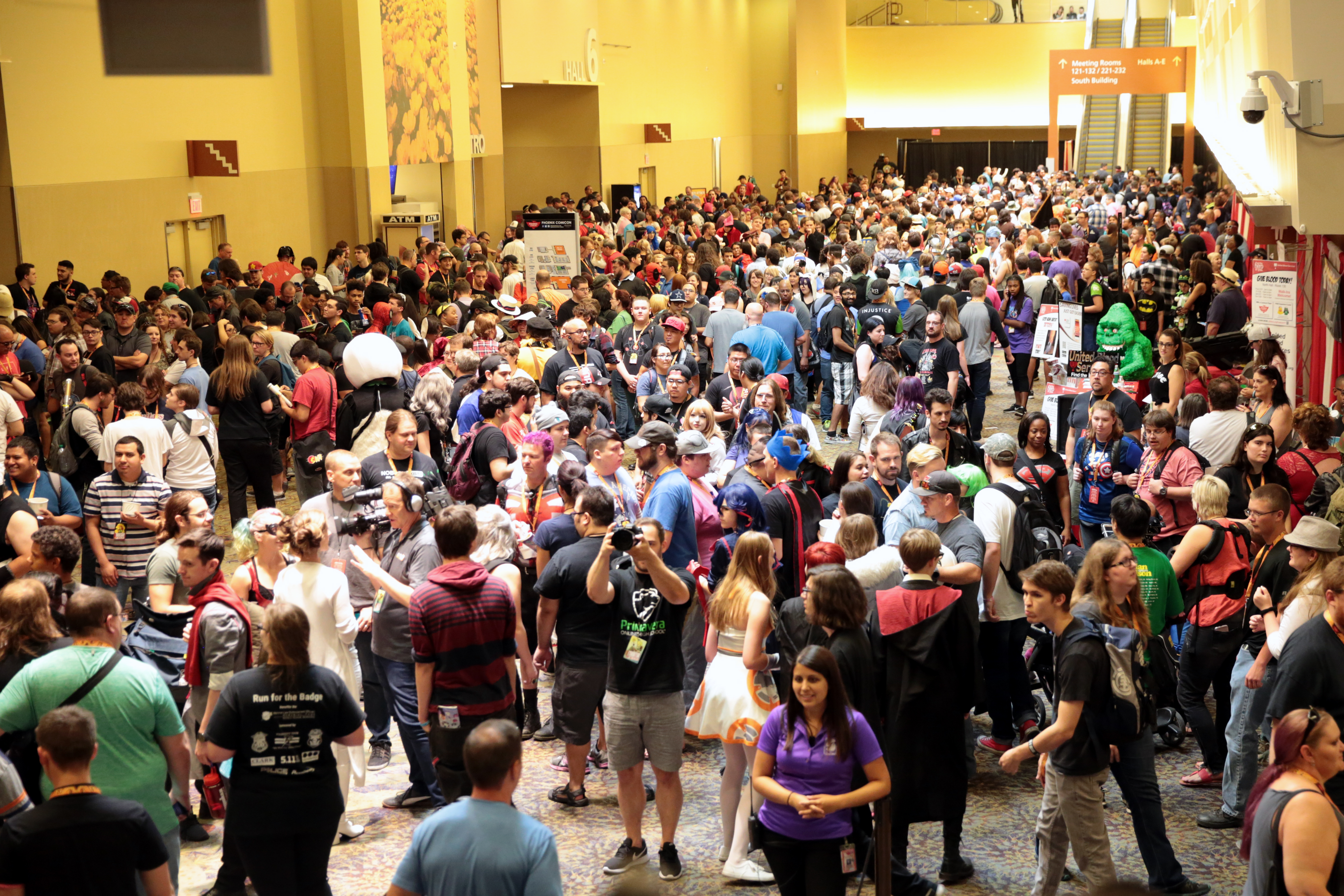
Phoenix Comicon 2017

The first Phoenix Comicon was held in June 2002 as Phoenix Cactus Comicon. It was a one-day convention lasting six hours held at a Best Western in Ahwatukee, Arizona. Admission was $3 per person and there were 432 attendees, along with a few local creators and exhibitors. The following three years, the convention was held at the Glendale Civic Center. The size of the convention and the attendance were doubled from the previous year, and the Sunday morning six-hour length of the convention was maintained. The convention began to bring out some guests from out of state including Spider-Man artist Todd Nauck and comic legend Marv Wolfman. The programming was increased to include Q&A's with guests, how-to workshops, and film trailer presentations.

In 2006, the convention was held at the Mesa Convention Center in Mesa, Arizona, for the first time in its history. It also became a two-day convention, with a Friday preview night, and featured guests such as voice actors Johnny Yong Bosch and Greg Ayres. The exhibitor room was dramatically expanded, as was the amount of programming offered. This was the first convention to expand beyond comic books into the greater pop culture community, including anime, manga, sci-Fi, fantasy and cosplay. Over the weekend, there were over 2,600 attendees. From 2007 to 2009, the convention was held in January at the Mesa Convention Center, where attendance jumped past 3,200. The convention first forayed into media guests in 2007, when Feedback, the winner of Stan Lee's Who Wants to Be a Superhero? attended. In 2009, the event was expanded to 3 days, with a Thursday preview night. It was also announced at the 2009 convention that due to an overwhelming attendance of around 7,000 people that year, the convention in 2010 would be moved to the Phoenix Convention Center the next year and that the dates would be moved to the end of May.

Starting in 2010, the convention was held on Memorial Day weekend at the Phoenix Convention Center and Grand Hyatt Hotel in Phoenix. This change was due to the large increase in attendance and the availability of funds to hold the convention in a larger venue. Increasingly popular celebrities such as Leonard Nimoy, George Takei, and Stan Lee also attended the convention as special guests. One of the highlights of the 2013 event included the world premiere of "Pilgrim of Eternity", the first full-length episode of the award-winning Star Trek Continues fan film web series and a sequel to "Who Mourns for Adonais?". In 2014, due to a scheduling conflict, the convention was moved to the first week of June as opposed to Memorial Day weekend. The convention also expanded its presence into the South and West buildings of the convention center, as well as nearby hotels including the Hyatt Regency Hotel, Marriott Renaissance Hotel and Sheraton Phoenix Downtown Hotel. The 2015 and 2016 convention took place the weekend after Memorial Day weekend at the Phoenix Convention Center, and further utilized the convention facilities, including expanding to the third level ballroom in order to accommodate a larger amount of attendees for popular media guests.

Beginning in 2017, the convention again took place on Memorial Day weekend at the Phoenix Convention Center, with the same being true through 2022.

On May 25, 2017, the first day of the 2017 convention, a man was arrested at the convention after posting his intent to kill police officers to Facebook and was found in possession of several firearms and knives. The man believed he was the Punisher, and intended to kill bad police officers, along with actor Jason David Frank, who was attending the convention as a guest. Security changes were made to the event, including a ban on prop weapons resembling any sort of gun which included those constructed from cardboard and foam. Other prop weapons needed to be deemed safe by security. Although vendors were still allowed to sell toy weapons, they were to be sealed and to be taken off the premises immediately after purchase. These new rules resulted in the cancellation of several panels focused on making prop weapons. The attendance for the convention declined steadily in the following days.

In January 2018, the convention was renamed Phoenix Comic Fest. This was done to avoid use of the term "comic con", which is a response to a San Diego Comic-Con lawsuit. In 2018, bracelets were given to attendees in place of laminated passes. On the Saturday of the con, a fire alarm caused an evacuation just before 8 pm; many attendees stayed just outside the convention center. At 9:30 p.m., it was determined to be a false alarm, but what was left of the scheduling for Saturday night had to be cancelled and rescheduled for safety reasons. The following morning the convention announced that attendees who had purchased a Saturday pass would be able to obtain a Sunday pass as compensation for Saturday's incident. The convention hours were extended as well. During the 2018 convention, it was announced that the convention would again be renamed in 2019 to Phoenix Fan Fusion.

The 2020 Phoenix Fan Fusion was cancelled due to the COVID-19 pandemic. It was initially deferred to 2021 but then rescheduled for January 2022. However, in September 2021, due to uncertainties surrounding Delta variant of COVID-19, Phoenix Fan Fusion was once again postponed to May 2022.

== Events ==
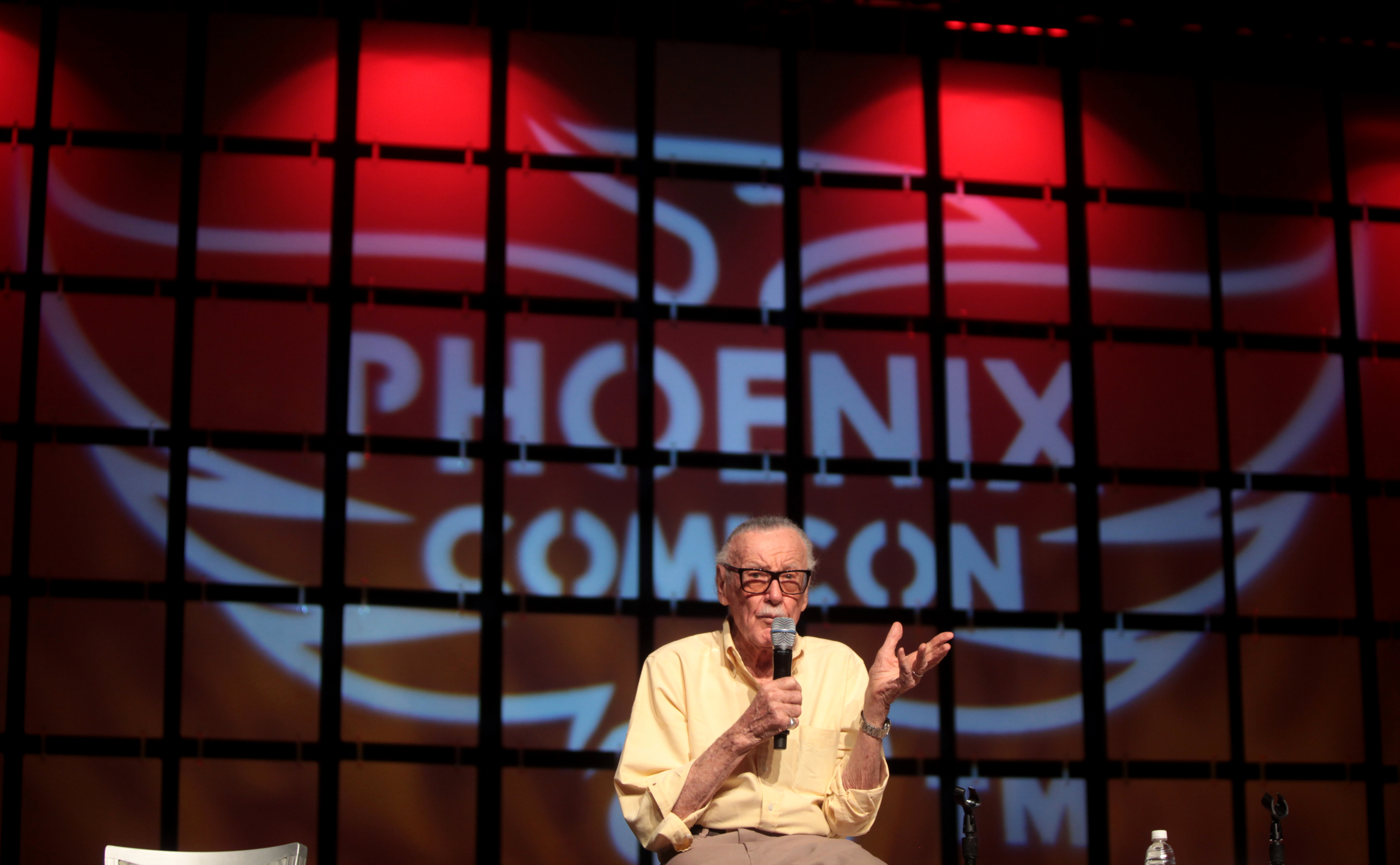
Stan Lee addressing attendees at the 2014 Phoenix Comicon.

Along with panels, seminars, and workshops with comic book professionals, evenings at the convention include events such as themed prom parties, the annual Masquerade costume contest, and a Film Festival with several different prize opportunities.

In 2014, Phoenix Comicon also began a partnership with NASA, allowing attendees to participate in the FameLab program, as well as hear from NASA representatives at various panels throughout the convention. Phoenix Comicon also partnered with media guests and entertainers to offer special events outside the convention, including a performance by Brian Posehn, Myq Kaplan, and Mike Drucker for their comedy group Comedy Mutant, as well as a one-man performance of Star Wars, presented by Charlie Ross.

Like most comics conventions, Phoenix Fan Fusion features a large floor space for exhibitors. These exhibitors include media companies, as well as comic-book dealers and collectibles merchants. The exclusive collectibles sold include merchandise of licensed movie, comic book, and animation characters. Also like most comics conventions, Phoenix Fan Fusion includes an autograph and photo opportunity area, as well as the Artists' Alley, where comics artists can sign autographs and provide free or paid sketches.

For the first time ever, Phoenix Comicon held a separate event in December 2014, titled Phoenix Comicon Fan Fest, at the University of Phoenix Stadium in Glendale, Arizona. The convention functioned as a smaller version of Phoenix Comicon, maintaining its usual elements of panels, workshops, and exhibitors, while expanding its focus on comic book artists, and fan interaction with its various media guests. Convention organizers stated that they saw a desire from their audience to host a convention in Arizona during the winter, but due to the costs involved with renting the Phoenix Convention Center and blocking off rooms at nearby hotels, the decision was made to host the Fan Fest in Glendale at the University of Phoenix Stadium. Several television and media guests attended the first ever Fan Fest, including David Ramsey, Colin Baker, and Michael Biehn among others, including several dozen comic book artists and creators. In 2016, the Fan Fest was moved to the Phoenix Convention Center, and took place in October, rather than December. The Fan Fest event was officially canceled by Square Egg Entertainment in June 2018.

== Locations and dates ==
=== Phoenix Fan Fusion / Comicon / Comic Fest ===
No.	Dates	Location	Attendance	Special Guests
1	June 9, 2002	Best Western Hotel, Ahwatukee, AZ	432	None
2	April 13, 2003	Glendale Civic Center	780	None
3	April 2004	Glendale Civic Center	690	None
4	April 2005	Glendale Civic Center	680	Todd Nauck, Marv Wolfman
5	September 23–24, 2006	Mesa Convention Center	2,600	Christine Auten, Greg Ayres, Josh Blaylock, Johnny Yong Bosch, Shannon Denton, Eyeshine, Christy Lijewski, Jen Quick, Armand Villavert Jr.
6	January 27–28, 2007	Mesa Convention Center	3,200	Shannon Denton, Crispin Freeman, Tiffany Grant, Matt Greenfield, M. Alice LeGrow, Angel Medina, Vic Mignogna, George Pérez, Jen Quick, Amy Reeder Hadley, among others.
7	January 26–27, 2008	Mesa Convention Center	5,200	Maral Agnerian, Greg Ayres, David Beaty, Jeremy Bulloch, Svetlana Chmakova, Luci Christian, Shannon Denton, Walter Koenig, Jeph Loeb, Peter Mayhew, Ed McGuinness, Dawn "Kaijugal" McKechnie, Angel Medina, Michelle Ruff, Armand Villavert Jr., Mark Waid, Wil Wheaton, Andrew Wheelan, among others.
8	January 23–25, 2009	Mesa Convention Center	7,000	David Beaty, Lou Ferrigno, Tiffany Grant, Erin Gray, Matt Greenfield, Reuben Langdon, Yuri Lowenthal, Tara Platt, Christophe Tang, Wil Wheaton, among others.
9	May 28–30, 2010	Phoenix Convention Center, Hyatt Regency Hotel	13,988	Stan Lee, Wil Wheaton, Lou Ferrigno, LeVar Burton, Felicia Day, Jonathan Frakes, Genie Francis, James Marsters, Philip Tan, Greg Capullo, Mike McFarland, John Scalzi, among others.
10	May 26–29, 2011	Phoenix Convention Center, Hyatt Regency Hotel	23,001	Stan Lee, Wil Wheaton, Leonard Nimoy, George Takei, Sandeep Parikh, Jeff Lewis, Cassandra Peterson, Billy Dee Williams, Paul McGillion, Todd McFarlane, Max Brooks, Bruce Boxleitner, Jaime Paglia, Aaron Douglas, Alex Albrecht, Kristin Bauer van Straten, Vic Mignogna, Kazha, Brina Palencia, Ernie Hudson, John Scalzi, Cherie Priest, Robert J. Sawyer, among others.
11	May 24–27, 2012	Phoenix Convention Center, Hyatt Regency Hotel	32,127	William Shatner, Ed Asner, George Pérez, Greg Horn, Yvonne Navarro, Jeff Mariotte, Jeremy Bulloch, Vic Mignogna, Kazha, Arthur Suydam, Gil Gerard, Erin Gray, James A. Owen, Gini Koch, Billy Tucci, Weston Ochse, Tony Amendola, Stuart Immonen, Kathryn Immonen, Brent Spiner, Levar Burton, Michael Dorn, Marina Sirtis, Colin Ferguson, David Finch, Garth Ennis, Craig W. Chenery, Casper Van Dien, Dina Meyer, Lou Ferrigno, Jon Bernthal, among others.
12	May 23–26, 2013	Phoenix Convention Center, Hyatt Regency Hotel, Marriott Renaissance Hotel	55,313	John Barrowman, Nichelle Nichols, J. Michael Straczynski, Bill Mumy, Claudia Christian, Jerry Doyle, Peter Jurasik, Jason Carter, Robin Atkin Downes, Andrea Thompson, Michael Forest, Tracy Scoggins, Julie Caitlin Brown, Mira Furlan, Walter Koenig, Pat Tallman, Stephen Furst, Cindy Morgan, Garrett Wang, Kristin Bauer, Amanda Tapping, Jewel Staite, Sam Witwer, Michael Rooker, Alexis Tipton, Gigi Edgley, David Franklin, Dean Cain, Chandler Riggs, Laurie Holden, Yuri Lowenthal, Vic Mignogna, Tara Platt, Grant Imahara, Wil Wheaton, Chris Gore, Tara Strong, among others.
13	June 5–8, 2014	Phoenix Convention Center, Hyatt Regency Hotel, Marriott Renaissance Hotel, Sheraton Phoenix Downtown Hotel	77,818	Bruce Campbell, Nathan Fillion, John Barrowman, Adam West, John Rhys-Davies, Mark Sheppard, Don Rosa, Mark Bagley, Patrick Rothfuss, Danny Glover, John Ratzenberger, Stan Lee, Brian Posehn, Burt Ward, Julie Newmar, Todd McFarlane, Walter Jones, David Yost, Austin St. John, Richard Dean Anderson, Charlaine Harris, Manu Bennett, Dean Lorey, Crispin Freeman, Jim Butcher, Todd Haberkorn, Jason Spisak, Cary Elwes, Stephen Amell, Michael Rooker, Kelly Le Brock, Catherine Bach, Amber Benson, Dean Lorey, Sonny Strait, Paul and Storm, among others.
14	May 28–31, 2015	Phoenix Convention Center, Hyatt Regency Hotel, Marriott Renaissance Hotel, Sheraton Phoenix Downtown Hotel	75,501	Summer Glau, Jason Momoa, Paul Cornell, Mike Zeck, Edward James Olmos, Charisma Carpenter, Renee Witterstaetter, Sherrilyn Kenyon, Jim Beaver, William Tucci, Scott Sigler, Lou Ferrigno, Weston Ochse, Yvonne Navarro, Van Jensen, Michael Shanks, Alexis Denisof, Alyson Hannigan, Barry Bostwick, Christopher Lloyd, Chuck Huber, Danielle Panabaker, David Morrissey, Jason Isaacs, Karl Urban, Katee Sackhoff, Lexa Doig, Mary McDonnell, Max Brooks, Nell Campbell, Patricia Quinn, Ron Perlman, Tom Kane, Roger L. Jackson, Veronica Taylor, Vic Mignogna, Todd Haberkorn, Chris Doohan, Michele Specht, David Baron, John Layman, Mike S. Miller, Brian Pulido, Art Adams, Todd Nauck, Eric Basaldua, Michael A. Stackpole, Bret Blevins, Joel Gomez, Don Rosa, Jacen Burrows, Brett Booth, Jae Lee, Fábio Moon, Gabriel Bá, Jim Steranko, Norm Rapmund, Rafael Albuquerque, Ryan Ottley, Tim Vigil, among others.
15	June 2–5, 2016	Phoenix Convention Center, Hyatt Regency Hotel	106,096	Alex Kingston, Billie Piper, Oded Fehr, Mark Pellegrino, Timothy Omundson, Bob Morley, Arryn Zech, Caitlin Glass, Caity Lotz, Dan Starkey, David Fielding, David Ramsey, D. C. Douglas, Emma Caulfield, Eve Myles, Gates McFadden, Glenn Morshower, James Marsters, Jess Harnell, Kane Hodder, Sam Jones, Patrick Rothfuss, George Perez, Kara Ashley, Ksenia Solo, Lee Majors, Lindsay Wagner, Martin Kove, Maurice LaMarche, Neve McIntosh, Nolan North, Ralph Macchio, Robert Beltran, Sean Astin, Tony Todd, Troy Baker, William Zabka, Mike Zeck, among others.
16	May 25–28, 2017	Phoenix Convention Center, Hyatt Regency Hotel	80,703	Dick Van Dyke, Alan Tudyk, Karen Gillan, Bonnie Wright, Jon Bernthal, Elden Henson, Kevin Conroy, PJ Haarsma, Gabriel Luna, Curtis Armstrong, Danny Trejo, Anthony Michael Hall, Vic Mignogna, Sean Schemmel, Christopher Sabat, Todd Haberkorn, Teddy Sears, Karen David, John de Lancie, Osric Chau, David Anders, Sean Maguire, Rachel Skarsten, Michael Rosenbaum, Neal McDonough, Ciara Renée, Garrett Wang, Robert Duncan McNeill, Jason David Frank, Osric Chau, Ryan Hurst, Peter David, Robin Hobb, Terry Brooks, Michael A. Stackpole, Arthur Suydam, Norm Rapmund, Dan Jurgens, Diane Pershing, Diana Gabaldon, Kevin J. Anderson, Timothy Zahn, Dan Wells, Jim Shooter, Jae Lee, Frank Beddor, Sam Sykes, Myke Cole, Pierce Brown, Jim Butcher, Sherrilyn Kenyon, among others.
17	May 24–27, 2018	Phoenix Convention Center	57,853	Tim Curry, William Shatner, Wil Wheaton, Michael Rooker, Dan Fogler, Sean Gunn, Greg Grunberg, Jason David Frank, Jeremy Bulloch, Michael Chiklis, Ming-Na Wen, Sean Maher, Adelaide Kane, Eddie McClintock, Graham McTavish, Manu Bennett, Linda Larkin, Paige O'Hara, Rebekah McKendry, Sam J. Jones, Charles Martinet, Bryce Papenbrook, Trina Nishimura, Barbara Dunkelman, Justin Briner, Steve Blum, Mary Elizabeth McGlynn, Greg Capullo, Scott Snyder, Jae Lee, Alan Davis, Todd McFarlane, Bob Camp, Brian Azzarello, Brian Pulido, Dan Parent, James Tynion IV, Marguerite Bennett, Mark Farmer, Klaus Janson, Adi Granov, Christopher Paolini, Cory Doctorow, Melissa Marr, Diana Gabaldon, Sam Sykes, Myke Cole, Alan Dean Foster, V. E. Schwab, Emily Devenport, Gail Carriger, Jody Lynn Nye, John Scalzi, Melinda M. Snodgrass, L. E. Modesitt, Jr., Mercedes Lackey, Sylvain Neuvel, Aprilynne Pike, Chuck Wendig, Delilah S. Dawson, Jeffrey Brown, Joseph Nassise, Michael A. Stackpole, Larry Dixon, Yvonne Navarro, among others.
18	May 23–26, 2019	Phoenix Convention Center		Adam Savage, Amy Jo Johnson, Arryn Zech, Barbara Dunkelman, Billy Dee Williams, Brian Herring, Catherine Tate, Chris Sarandon, Christopher Sabat, Elijah Wood, Garrett Wang, George Takei, James Rallison, Jeff Goldblum, Jeremy Shada, John Barrowman, Kara Eberle, Lucie Pohl, Matthew Lewis, Nichelle Nichols, Paul Reubens, Phi Phi O'Hara, Ray Park, Robin Lord Taylor, Samantha Ireland, Steve Cardenas, Summer Glau, Tom Kenny, Walter Koenig, among others.
19	May 27-29, 2022	Phoenix Convention Center		Billy West, Christopher Daniel Barnes, Christopher Eccleston, Doug Jones, Felicia Day, Jim Cummings, Jodi Benson, John DiMaggio, Katie Griffin, Linda Ballantyne, Heartless Aquarius, James A. Owen, among others.
20	June 2-4, 2023	Phoenix Convention Center		Stephen Amell, Christopher Eccleston, Matt Lanter, Katee Sackhoff, Jeremy Renner, Sonequa Martin-Green, James Arnold Taylor
21	May 24-26, 2024	Phoenix Convention Center		Dee Bradley Baker, Dante Basco, Giancarlo Esposito, Zach Aguilar, Todd McFarlane, Simu Liu, Michael Rooker, Alan Tudyk, Dick Van Dyke
22	June 6-8, 2025	Phoenix Convention Center	130,145	Hayden Christensen, Elijah Wood, Dominic Monaghan, Sean Astin, Billy Boyd, John Rhys-Davies, Marisa Tomei, Ron Perlman, Chloe Bennett, Ming-Na Wen, Jeff Ward, Vincent D'Onofrio, Anthony Daniels, Kevin Altieri, Manny Jacinto, Rob Wiethoff, Roger Clark, Simon Pegg, Rainn Wilson, Jonathan Frakes, Brent Spiner, Paige O'Hara, Eugene Cordero, Jason Lee, Kevin Smith, Jason Mewes, Katey Sagal
23	June 5-7, 2026	Phoenix Convention Center		Misha Collins, Liam O'Brien, Emily Swallow, Scott Patterson, Jamie Campbell Bower, Reagan Murdock, Whitney Moore, Matthew Mercer, Luis Carazo, Alexander Ward, Marisha Ray, Sandy Fox, Neil Newbon, Kevin Smith, Danny Elfman, Brian O'Halloran, Adam McArthur, John Rhys Davies, Steve Burns, Ruth Connell, Rob Benedict, Peggy "Dogpool", Nikki Reed, Kim Rhodes, Ian Somerhalder, Heather Locklear, Emi Lo, Briana Buckmaster, Laura Bailey, Kaiji Tang, John Cena, Sarah Wiedenheft, George Takei, Maile Flanagan, Ray Chase, Max Mittelman, Travis Willingham, May Hong, Ryan Colt Levy, Sean Gunn, Lex Lang, Eric Vale, Jim Beaver, Anne Yatco, Robbie Daymond, Lex Lang

=== Phoenix Fan Fest ===
	Date	Location	Attendance	Special Guests
1	December 12–14, 2014	University of Phoenix Stadium	11,403	David Ramsey, Colin Baker, Paul McGann, Tom Skerritt, Ben Browder, Michael Biehn, Jennifer Blanc, Eddie McClintock, Linda Blair, Jae Lee, Bob Layton, Norm Rapmund, Neal Adams, James A. Owen, among others.
2	December 4–6, 2015	University of Phoenix Stadium, Renaissance Hotel Glendale	Unknown	Karen Gillan, Sean Maher, Alaina Huffman, Julian Richings, Gareth David-Lloyd, Dirk Benedict, Denise Crosby, W. Morgan Sheppard, Kevin Sorbo, Alan Oppenheimer, Melendy Britt, Tom Lenk, Tim Seeley, Aaron Lopresti, Don Rosa, Frank Beddor, among others.
3	October 22–23, 2016	Phoenix Convention Center	Unknown	Millie Bobby Brown, John Cena, Nikki Bella, Brie Bella, Daniel Bryan, Brett Dalton, Elizabeth Henstridge, David Harbour, Jake "The Snake" Roberts, Bob Layton, Tahmoh Penikett, The Honky Tonk Man, Tim Rose, among others.
4	November 11–12, 2017	Phoenix Convention Center	Unknown	Ernie Hudson, Zach Callison, Mara Wilson, AJ Michalka, Kevin McNally, Mallory Jansen, Gail Kim, Lisa Marie Varon, Grace Rolek, Peter Ostrum, Julie Dawn Cole, Denise Nickerson, Paris Themmen, James A. Owen, Aprilynne Pike, among others.
