= Diana Gabaldon =

American author (born 1952)

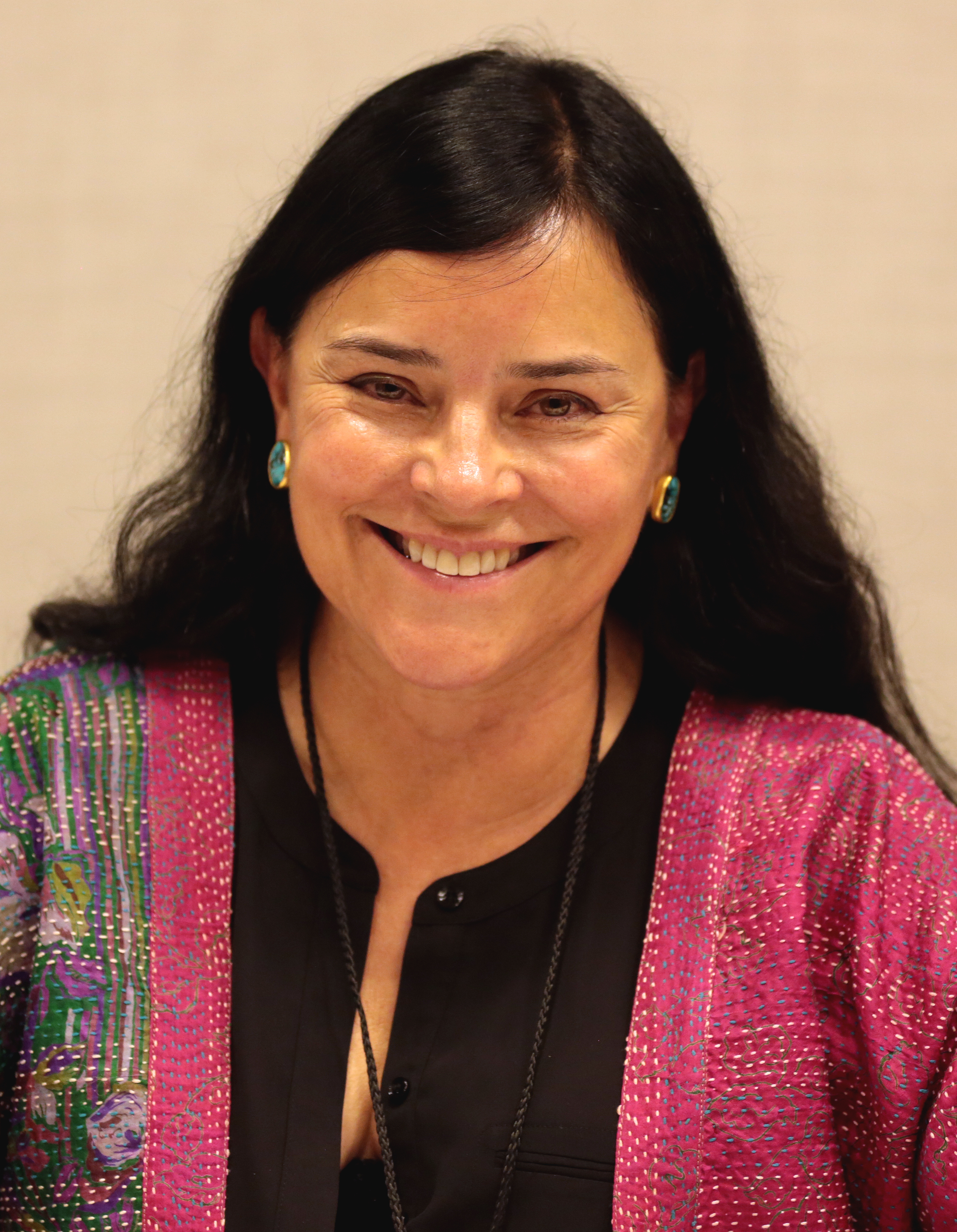
- Gabaldon in 2017
- Born: January 11, 1952 (age 74); Williams, Arizona, US
- Education: Northern Arizona University (BS, PhD); University of California, San Diego (MS)
- Occupations: Novelist, professor
- Spouse: Doug Watkins
- Children: 3 (including Sam Sykes)
- Parent: Tony Gabaldon (father)
- Writing career
- Period: 1991–present
- Genres: Speculative fiction, historical fiction, historical romance, historical mystery, historical fantasy, scientific literature
- Notable works: Science Software Quarterly; Outlander series; Lord John series
- Website: www.dianagabaldon.com

Diana J. Gabaldon (/ˈɡæbəldoʊn/; born January 11, 1952) is an American author and television writer. She is best known for the book series Outlander. Her books merge multiple genres, featuring elements of historical fiction, romance, mystery, adventure and science fiction/fantasy. A television adaptation of the Outlander novels premiered on Starz in 2014.

== Early life and education ==
Gabaldon was born on January 11, 1952, in Williams, Arizona, United States, the daughter of Jacqueline Sykes and Tony Gabaldon (1930–1998), an Arizona state senator from Flagstaff for sixteen years and later a supervisor of Coconino County. Her father was of Mexican ancestry, and her mother was of English descent.

Gabaldon grew up in Flagstaff, Arizona. She earned a bachelor of science in zoology from Northern Arizona University(1970–1973), a master of science in marine biology from the University of California, San Diego, Scripps Institution of Oceanography (1973–1975), and a PhD in behavioral ecology from Northern Arizona University(1975–1978).

== Career ==
Diana Gabaldon began her writing career at Gold Key Comics, initially sending a query that stated, "I've been reading your comics for the last 25 years, and they've been getting worse and worse. I'm not sure if I could do better myself, but I'd like to try." Editor Del Connell provided a script sample and bought her second submission.

Gabaldon was the founding editor of Science Software Quarterly in 1984 while employed at the Center for Environmental Studies at Arizona State University. During the 1980s, Gabaldon wrote software reviews and technical articles for computer publications such as a review of Full Impact, as well as popular-science articles and Disney comics. She was a professor with an expertise in scientific computation at ASU for 12 years before leaving to write full-time.

=== Novels ===
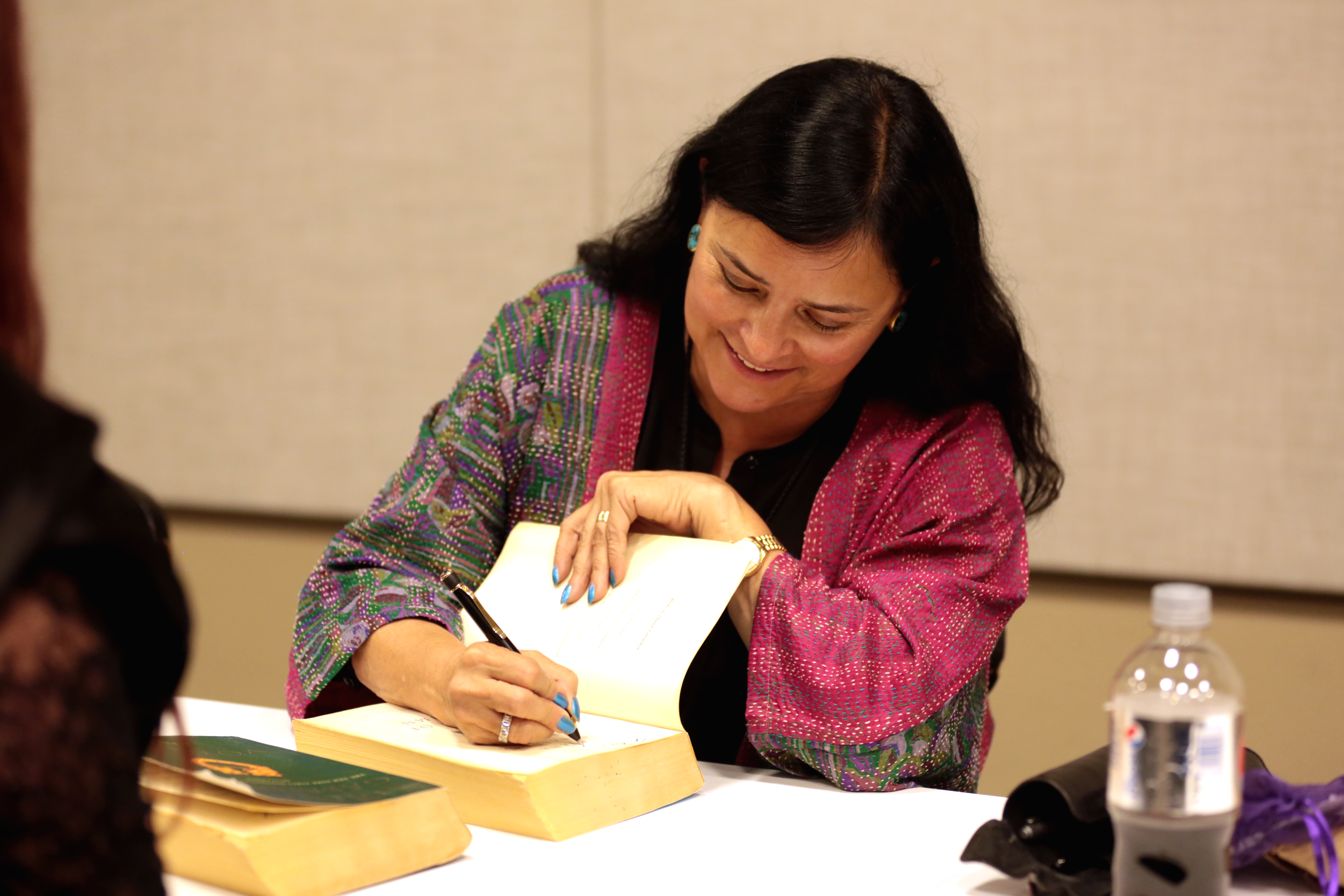
Gabaldon signing books at the 2017 Phoenix Comicon

In 1988, Gabaldon decided to write a novel for "practice, just to learn how", and with no intention to show it to anyone. As a research professor, she decided that a historical novel would be easiest to research and write, but she had no background in history and initially no particular time period in mind. Gabaldon happened to see a rerun episode of the Doctor Who science fiction TV series titled "The War Games". One of the Doctor's companions was a Scot from around 1745, a young man about 17 years old named Jamie McCrimmon, who provided the initial inspiration for her main male character, James Fraser, and for her novel's mid-18th century Scotland setting. Gabaldon decided to have "an Englishwoman to play off all these kilted Scotsmen", but her female character "took over the story and began telling it herself, making smart-ass modern remarks about everything".

To explain the character's modern behavior and attitudes, Gabaldon chose to use time travel. Writing the novel at a time "when the World Wide Web didn't exist", she did her research "the old-fashioned way, by herself, through books". Later, Gabaldon posted a short excerpt of her novel on the CompuServe Literary Forum, where author John E. Stith introduced her to literary agent Perry Knowlton. Knowlton represented her based on an unfinished first novel, tentatively titled Cross Stitch. Her first book deal was for a trilogy, the first novel plus two then-unwritten sequels. Her US publishers changed the first book's title to Outlander, but the title remained unchanged in the UK. According to Gabaldon, her British publishers liked the title Cross Stitch, a play on "a stitch in time"; however, the American publisher said it "sounded too much like embroidery" and wanted a more "adventurous" title. When her second book was finished, Gabaldon resigned her faculty position at Arizona State University to become a full-time author.

As of 2021, the Outlander series comprises nine published novels. The ninth installment, Go Tell the Bees That I Am Gone, was published on November 23, 2021. Gabaldon also published The Exile (An Outlander Graphic Novel) in 2010. The Lord John series are additional books in the Outlander series rather than a spin-off series, centering on a secondary character from the original series. Gabaldon announced in September 2021 that she is working on the tenth Outlander series book. In May 2025 she announced that she is still writing the book, that it will be the final novel in the main series, and that it be called A Blessing for a Warrior Going Out.

== Personal life ==
Gabaldon lives in Scottsdale, Arizona, with her husband Doug Watkins, with whom she has three adult children. Her son, Sam Sykes, is also a fantasy writer.

Gabaldon is a Roman Catholic and identifies as a Libertarian.

== Published works ==
=== Outlander series ===
The Outlander series focuses on 20th-century nurse Claire Randall, who time travels to 18th-century Scotland and finds adventure and romance with the dashing James Fraser. Set in Scotland, France, the West Indies, England and North America, the novels merge multiple genres, featuring elements of historical fiction, romance, mystery, adventure and science fiction/fantasy.

==== Main series ====
- Outlander (1991) (published in the UK and Australia as Cross Stitch)
- Dragonfly in Amber (1992)
- Voyager (1993)
- Drums of Autumn (1996)
- The Fiery Cross (2001)
- A Breath of Snow and Ashes (2005)
- An Echo in the Bone (2009)
- Written in My Own Heart's Blood (2014)
- Go Tell the Bees That I Am Gone (2021)

==== Short works ====
- "A Leaf on the Wind of All Hallows" (2010), a short story in the anthology Songs of Love and Death. Later collected in A Trail of Fire (2012), and Seven Stones to Stand or Fall (2017).
- The Space Between (2013), a novella in the anthology The Mad Scientist's Guide to World Domination. Later collected in A Trail of Fire (2012), and Seven Stones to Stand or Fall (2017).
- Virgins (2013), a novella in the anthology Dangerous Women, later collected in Seven Stones to Stand or Fall (2017).
- "Past Prologue" (2017), a short story written with Steve Berry and published in the anthology MatchUp. The story acts as a crossover between the Outlander franchise and Berry's Cotton Malone series, featuring the characters Cotton Malone and Jamie Fraser.
- A Fugitive Green (2017), a novella published in the Gabaldon collection Seven Stones to Stand or Fall.

==== Related ====
- The Outlandish Companion (1999), a guide to the Outlander series containing synopses, a character guide, and other notes and information; revised and updated as The Outlandish Companion (Volume One) (2015)
- The Exile: An Outlander Graphic Novel (2010)
- The Outlandish Companion (Volume Two) (2015)
- "Vengeance Is Mine", Outlander season 2 episode (June 18, 2016)
- "Journeycake", Outlander season 5 episode (May 3, 2020)
- "Ye Dinna Get Used to It", Outlander season 7 episode (December 27, 2024)
- "Braemar", Outlander: Blood of My Blood season 1 episode (September 26, 2025)
- "Something Borrowed", Outlander: Blood of My Blood season 1 episode (October 10, 2025; co-written with Matthew B. Roberts)

=== Lord John series ===
The Lord John series is a sequence of novels and shorter works that center on Lord John Grey, a recurring secondary character in Gabaldon's Outlander series. The spin-off series currently consists of five novellas and three novels, which all take place between 1756 and 1761, during the events of Gabaldon's Voyager. They can be generally categorized as historical mysteries, and the three novels are shorter and focus on fewer plot threads than the main Outlander books.

- Lord John and the Private Matter (2003), novel
- Lord John and the Brotherhood of the Blade (2007), novel
- The Scottish Prisoner (2011), novel

==== Novellas ====
- Lord John and the Hellfire Club (1998), novella first published in the anthology Past Poisons, edited by Maxim Jakubowski
- Lord John and the Succubus (2003), novella first published in Legends II, edited by Robert Silverberg
- Lord John and the Haunted Soldier (2007), novella published in Lord John and the Hand of Devils
- Lord John and the Hand of Devils (2007), collection of three novellas (Lord John and the Hellfire Club, Lord John and the Succubus and Lord John and the Haunted Soldier)
- The Custom of the Army (2010), novella published in Warriors, edited by George R.R. Martin and Gardner Dozois, and later collected in Seven Stones to Stand or Fall (2017).
- Lord John and the Plague of Zombies (2011), novella published in Down These Strange Streets, edited by George R.R. Martin and Gardner Dozois, and later collected in Seven Stones to Stand or Fall (2017).
- Besieged (2017), novella published in the Gabaldon collection Seven Stones to Stand or Fall.

=== Other works ===
- Naked Came the Phoenix (2001), a collaboration with twelve other authors
- "Humane Killer", short story co-written with Sam Sykes, published in The Dragon Book: Magical Tales from the Masters of Modern Fantasy (2009)
- "Dirty Scottsdale", short crime story set in Phoenix, Arizona, published in Phoenix Noir (2009), an anthology with fifteen other authors

=== Scientific works ===
Professor Gabaldon's research works included:

- Gabaldon, Diana J. (1979). Factors involved in nest site selection by piñon jays (Thesis). Flagstaff, AZ: Northern Arizona University. p. 241.

- Doctoral dissertation about the Pinyon jay

- Clark, L.; Gabaldon, Diana J. (1979). "Nest Desertion by the Piñon Jay" (PDF). The Auk. 96 (4). American Ornithological Society: 796–798. doi:10.1093/auk/96.4.796 (inactive July 11, 2025). JSTOR 4085669. S2CID 86007311. Archived from the original (PDF) on July 1, 2016.

- Cited in Pinyon jay

- Gabaldon, Diana J. (1979). "Observation of a Possible Alternate Mode of Feeding in a Porcellanid Crab (Petrolisthes Cabrilloi Glassell, 1945) (Decapoda, Anomura)". Crustaceana. 36 (1). Brill: 110–112. doi:10.1163/156854079x00285. ISSN 0011-216X. JSTOR 20103368. S2CID 84962642.

- About Petrolisthes cabrilloi

- Montevecchi, W. A.; Ricklefs, R. E.; Kirkham, I. R.; Gabaldon, Diana (April 1, 1984). "Growth Energetics of Nestling Northern Gannets (Sula bassanus)". The Auk. 101 (2). American Ornithological Society: 334–341. doi:10.1093/auk/101.2.334. ISSN 0004-8038. S2CID 55118062.

- Cited in Northern gannet

- Gordon, M. S.; Gabaldon, Diana J.; Yip, A. Y.-w. (1985). "Exploratory observations on microhabitat selection within the intertidal zone by the Chinese mudskipper fish Periophthalmus cantonensis". Marine Biology. 85 (2). Springer: 209–215. Bibcode:1985MarBi..85..209G. doi:10.1007/bf00397439. ISSN 0025-3162. S2CID 83585142.

- About the New Guinea mudskipper

== Adaptations ==
The Outlander series has been released in unabridged (read by Davina Porter) and abridged (read by Geraldine James) audiobooks. Several of the Lord John books have been released in audiobook form, read by Jeff Woodman.

A television adaptation of the Outlander series premiered on Starz in the US on August 9, 2014. Gabaldon made a cameo appearance as Iona MacTavish in the August 2014 episode "The Gathering". Gabaldon is a paid consultant for the show, and wrote the screenplay for the 2016 season 2 episode "Vengeance Is Mine".

In 2010 Gabaldon adapted the first third of Outlander into The Exile: An Outlander Graphic Novel, illustrated by Hoang Nguyen. The same year, a 14-song cycle based on Outlander was released under the title Outlander: The Musical.

== Reception and awards ==
Gabaldon's Outlander won the Romance Writers of America's RITA Award for Best Romance of 1991. A Breath of Snow and Ashes (2005) debuted at #1 on The New York Times Hardcover Fiction Best-Seller List and won the Quill Award for Science Fiction/Fantasy/Horror. In 2007, The Montreal Gazette noted that Gabaldon's books "are in demand in 24 countries in 19 languages", and that the author "continues to churn out one bestseller after another". By 2012 her novels had been published in 27 countries and 24 languages. She has since gone on to win numerous awards for both her writing and her contributions to the UK, one of which was from the National Trust for Scotland's "Great Scot" award, rarely given to a non-Scot. Also, Gabaldon received the St Andrews Society of Los Angeles & Southern California "Robert Burns Lifetime Achievement Award." Gabaldon continues to be recognized and given accolades.

Lord John and the Private Matter reached No. 8 on The New York Times Hardcover Fiction Best-Seller List in 2003. In 2007, Lord John and the Brotherhood of the Blade debuted at #1, and the Hand of Devils collection reached No. 24 on The New York Times Hardcover Fiction Best-Seller List. The Scottish Prisoner debuted at #6 on The New York Times E-Book Fiction Best-Seller List in 2011, and the novella A Plague of Zombies was nominated for an Edgar Award by the Mystery Writers of America for the “Best Short Mystery Story” the same year. Reviewing the Lord John series, Publishers Weekly said that "Gabaldon's prose is crisply elegant", and that she "brings an effusive joy to her fiction that proves infectious even for readers unfamiliar with her work or the period".
