= Songs of Love and Death (anthology) =

2010 anthology edited by George R. R. Martin and Gardner Dozois

- First edition cover
- Editors: George R. R. Martin; Gardner Dozois
- Author: Various
- Language: English
- Genre: Romance/Science fiction/Fantasy
- Published: November 16, 2010
- Publisher: Gallery Books
- Publication place: United States
- Media type: Print (hardcover)
- Pages: 480
- ISBN: 1439150141

Songs of Love and Death: All-Original Tales of Star-Crossed Love is a cross-genre anthology featuring 17 original short stories of romance in science fiction/fantasy settings, edited by George R. R. Martin and Gardner Dozois and released on November 16, 2010. Suzanne Johnson wrote for Tor.com, "From zombie-infested woods in a postapocalyptic America to faery-haunted rural fields in eighteenth-century England, from the kingdoms of high fantasy to the alien world of a galaxy-spanning empire, these are stories of lovers who must struggle against the forces of magic and fate."

== Contents ==
1. “Love Hurts” by Jim Butcher (The Dresden Files)
2. “The Marrying Maid” by Jo Beverley
3. “Rooftops” by Carrie Vaughn
4. “Hurt Me” by M.L.N. Hanover
5. “Demon Lover” by Cecelia Holland
6. “The Wayfarer’s Advice” by Melinda M. Snodgrass (Imperials)
7. “Blue Boots” by Robin Hobb
8. “The Thing About Cassandra” by Neil Gaiman
9. “After the Blood” by Marjorie M. Liu
10. “You and You Alone” by Jacqueline Carey (Kushiel's Legacy)
11. “His Wolf” by Lisa Tuttle
12. “Courting Trouble” by Linnea Sinclair
13. “The Demon Dancer” by Mary Jo Putney
14. “Under/Above the Water” by Tanith Lee
15. “Kashkia” by Peter S. Beagle
16. “Man in the Mirror” by Yasmine Galenorn
17. “A Leaf on the Wind of All Hallows” by Diana Gabaldon (Outlander)
