= Kushiel's Avatar =

2003 novel by Jacqueline Carey

- First edition cover
- Author: Jacqueline Carey
- Cover artist: John Jude Palencar
- Language: English
- Series: Kushiel's Legacy
- Genre: Fantasy
- Publisher: Tor Books
- Publication date: 2003
- Publication place: United States
- Media type: Print (Hardback & Paperback)
- ISBN: 0-312-87240-2 (first edition, hardback)
- OCLC: 51088193
- Dewey Decimal: 813/.6 21
- LC Class: PS3603.A74 K77 2003
- Preceded by: Kushiel's Chosen
- Followed by: Kushiel's Scion

Kushiel's Avatar is a 2003 fantasy novel by American writer Jacqueline Carey, the third book in her Kushiel's Legacy series. It is often referred to as the last of the Phèdre Trilogy.

== Synopsis ==
In the ten years of peace following the events of Kushiel's Chosen, Phèdre nó Delaunay has established a position of prominence. As a leading courtesan of Terre D'Ange and confidante of the Queen, she occupies a significant place in D'Angeline society. However, the fate of her longtime friend Hyacinthe, who is bound by the terms of an angel's curse, continues to concern her. The search for the means of his freedom becomes connected with the search for the missing son of her former lover and adversary, Melisande Shahrizai. Phèdre and her consort Joscelin Verreuil travel through several lands, ultimately locating the boy in a remote and dangerous place, and working to free him from his captors.
