= Alyson Hannigan =

American actress and television presenter (born 1974)

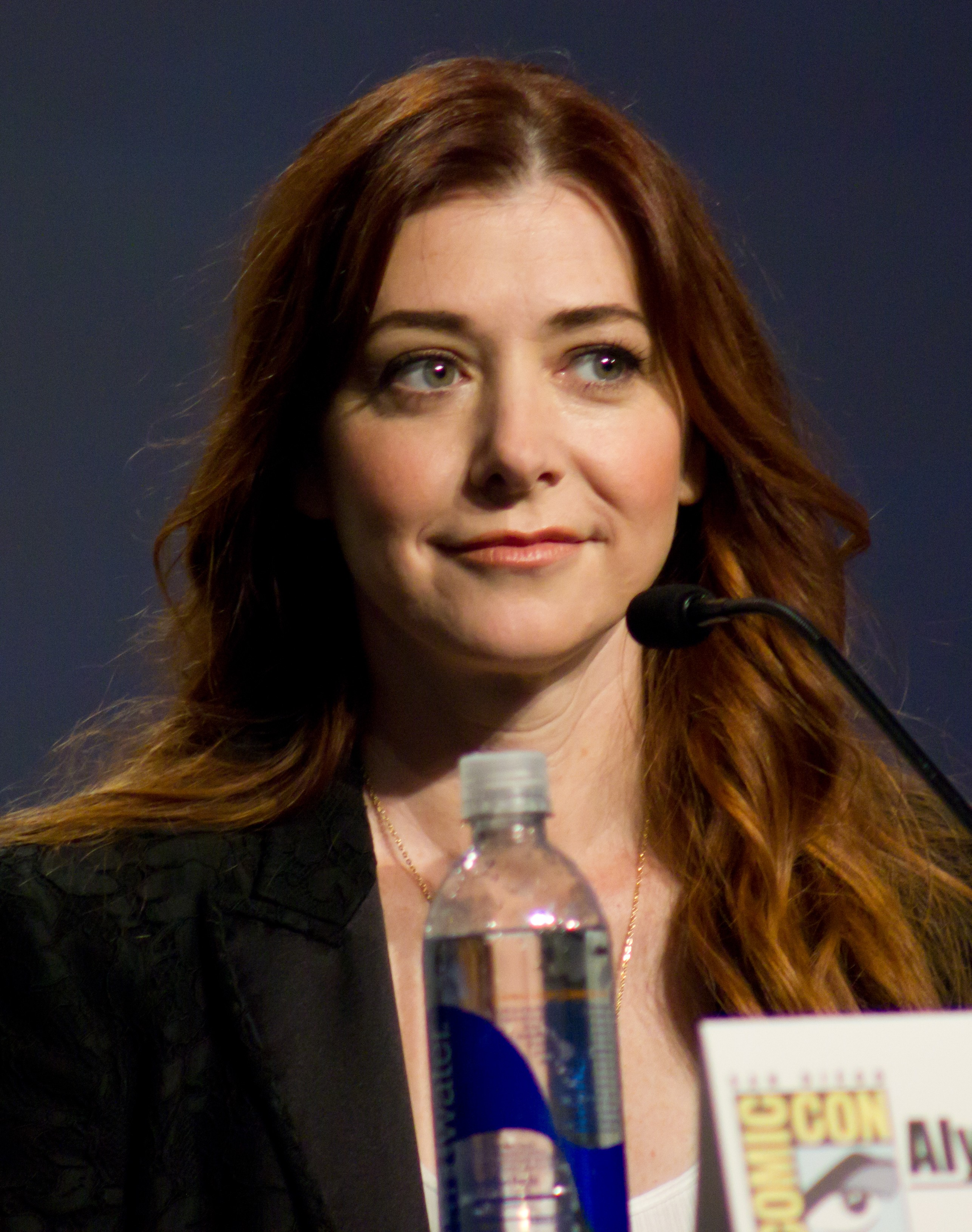
- Hannigan in 2013
- Born: March 24, 1974 (age 52); Washington, D.C., U.S.
- Other name: Alyson Denisof
- Education: California State University, Northridge (BA)
- Occupations: Actress; television presenter
- Years active: 1986–present
- Spouse: Alexis Denisof (m. 2003)
- Children: 2

Signature
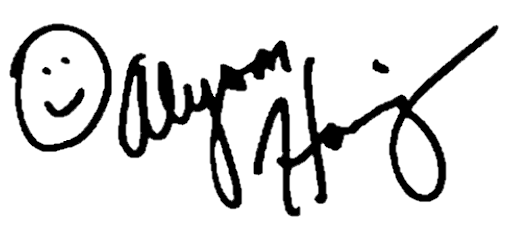

Alyson Lee Hannigan (born March 24, 1974) is an American actress and television presenter. She began her film career with supporting roles in the comedy films Impure Thoughts (1986) and My Stepmother Is an Alien (1988), receiving a Young Artist Award nomination for the latter. In 1999, she began starring in the American Pie film series as Michelle Flaherty, the films' primary love interest, appearing in every film in the series from 1999 to 2012. For her role in the series, she was nominated for three Teen Choice Awards and won a Young Hollywood Award. She went on to star in the parody film Date Movie (2006), the slasher film You Might Be the Killer (2018), and the superhero film Flora & Ulysses (2021).

Hannigan got her start in television starring in the short-lived sitcom Free Spirit from 1989 to 1990, for which she earned a Young Artist Award nomination. After several minor roles in television films and other series, she appeared in her breakout role as teenage witch Willow Rosenberg in the supernatural drama series Buffy the Vampire Slayer, appearing in every episode from 1997 to 2003. Her role on the show was critically acclaimed and won her the Saturn Award for Best Supporting Actress on Television and a Teen Choice Award. From 2005 to 2014, she starred as Lily Aldrin in the sitcom How I Met Your Mother, for which she won two People's Choice Awards. Hannigan hosted the television show Penn & Teller: Fool Us (2016–2023), and provided the voice of Claire Clancy in the Disney Junior animated series Fancy Nancy (2018–2022).

== Early life and education ==
Hannigan was born on March 24, 1974 in Washington, D.C., the only child of Emilie (Posner) Haas, a real-estate agent, and Alan Hannigan, a Teamsters trucker. Her father is of Irish ancestry and her mother is Jewish. At age four, Hannigan began appearing in commercials. After spending her childhood in her mother's hometown of Atlanta, Georgia, Hannigan moved to Hollywood at age 11 after securing an agent. As a teenager, Hannigan babysat for the children of her future How I Met Your Mother co-star, Bob Saget.

Living with her mother and attending North Hollywood High School, she successfully auditioned for agents while visiting her father in Santa Barbara. After high school, she attended California State University, Northridge, where she was a member of the Alpha Chi Omega sorority and earned a degree in psychology.

== Career ==
=== 1986–2004: Career beginnings and breakthrough ===
Hannigan's first major film role was in My Stepmother Is an Alien, a science-fiction comedy released in 1988; one of her co-stars in the film was actor Seth Green, who later joined her in the regular cast of Buffy the Vampire Slayer as her on-screen boyfriend. In 1989, her first regular role on a television series came when she was cast in the short-lived ABC sitcom Free Spirit.

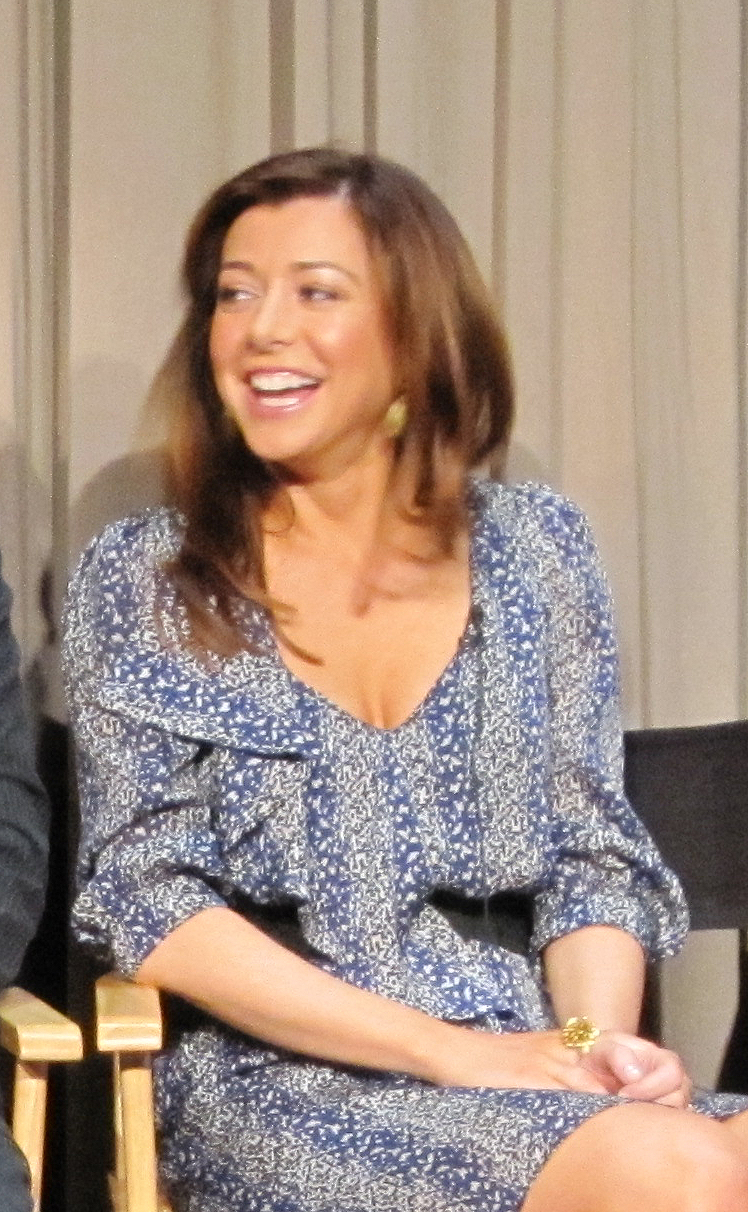
Hannigan at a celebration of the 100th episode of How I Met Your Mother at the Paley Centre, 2010

In 1997, Hannigan was cast to play Willow Rosenberg, Buffy Summers' best friend, on the supernatural television series Buffy the Vampire Slayer. The show became a success, and Hannigan gained recognition, subsequently appearing in several films aimed at teenage audiences, including Boys and Girls (2000). She had a supporting role as Michelle Flaherty in the comedy film American Pie (1999), and appeared in a much larger role in its sequels American Pie 2 (2001) and American Wedding (2003). In 2017, Forbes reported that the American Pie films have grossed $989.5 million at the worldwide box office, and became a pop culture phenomenon.

She also had a recurring guest spot on the Buffy the Vampire Slayer spin-off, Angel, reprising her role of Willow. In early 2004, Hannigan made her West End debut, starring in a stage adaptation of When Harry Met Sally... at the Theatre Royal Haymarket, opposite Luke Perry.

=== 2005–2014: How I Met Your Mother ===
In early 2005, she had a recurring guest role as Trina Echolls in three episodes of UPN's teen mystery series Veronica Mars. In September 2005, Hannigan returned to starring in a regular television series, taking the main role of Lily Aldrin in CBS's sitcom How I Met Your Mother. The series followed architect Ted Mosby and his group of friends in New York City. Ted recounts to his children the events that led him to meet their mother. Hannigan's character Lily was a kindergarten teacher and amateur painter, who eventually married lawyer Marshall Eriksen, portrayed by Jason Segel. Hannigan won the People's Choice Award for Favorite TV Comedy Actress in 2010. Known for its unique structure, humor, and incorporation of dramatic elements, How I Met Your Mother was popular throughout its run. The series ran for nine seasons and the one-hour series finale aired on March 31, 2014.

In February 2006, she starred as Julia Jones in Date Movie, a parody of romantic comedies. She was also a guest star on the ABC animated sitcom The Goode Family in 2009.

Hannigan joined forces with Emily Deschanel, Jaime King, Minka Kelly, and Katharine McPhee in a "video slumber party" featured on FunnyorDie.com to promote regular breast cancer screenings for the organization Stand Up 2 Cancer. Hannigan reprised the role of Michelle in the comedy film American Reunion (2012). The film followed the friends attending a high school reunion thirteen years after graduating from high school. The film was a success at the box office, and grossed $235 million worldwide. For her role in the film, she was nominated for Choice Movie Actress: Romantic Comedy award at the 2012 Teen Choice Awards.

=== 2015–present: Television hosting ===
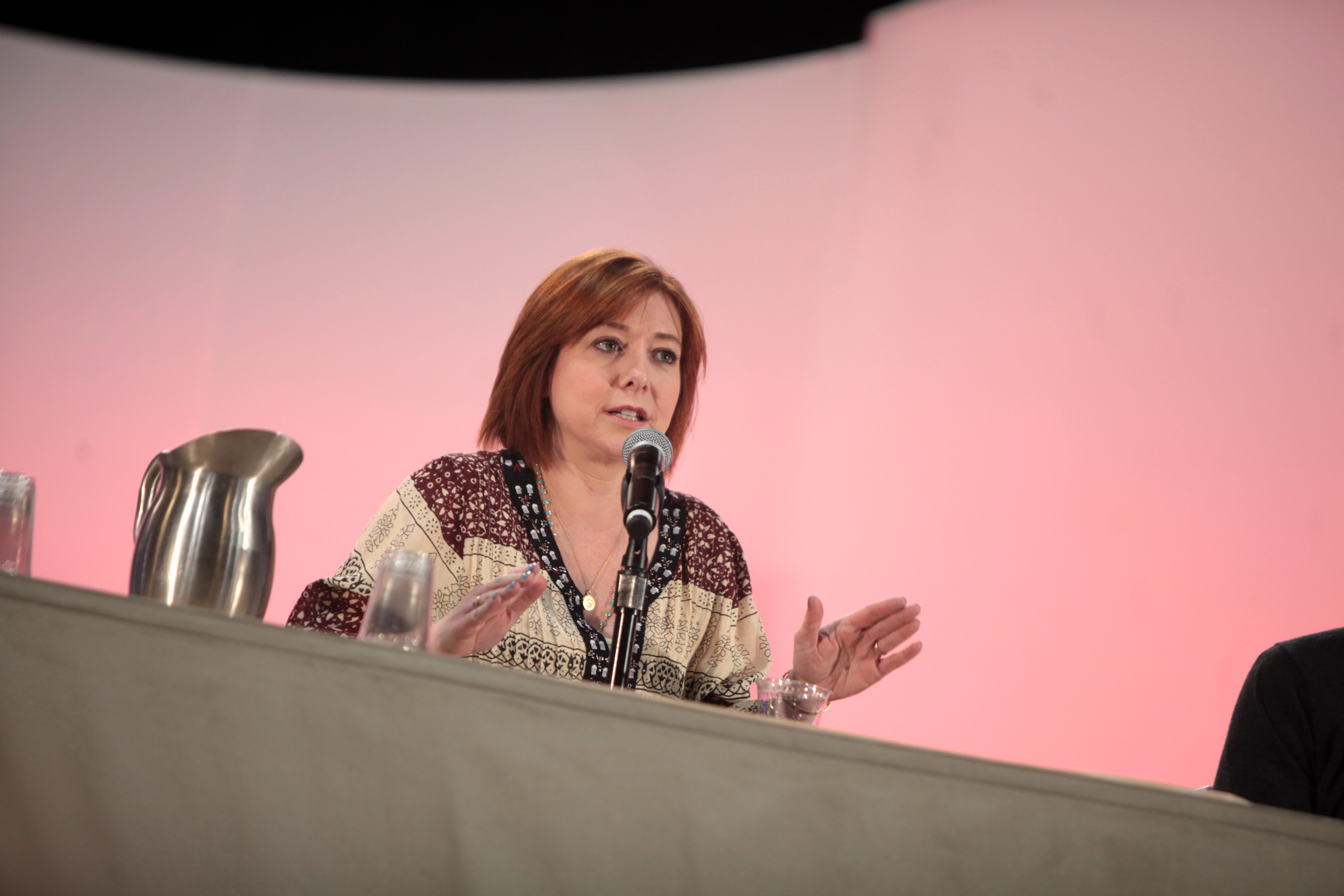
Hannigan at the 2015 Phoenix Comicon

Hannigan hosted the television series Penn & Teller: Fool Us from 2016 to 2023. Hannigan played Ann Possible, Kim's mother, in the Disney Channel original film Kim Possible (2019), based on the animated series. She voiced the role of Claire Nancy in Disney Junior's animated series Fancy Nancy (2018–2022). The show ran for three seasons, and the series finale aired on February 18, 2022.

In September 2023, Hannigan was announced as one of the contestants on season 32 of Dancing with the Stars, partnering with Sasha Farber. The couple made it to the finals and finished in fifth place.

Hannigan played a supporting role in the 2026 romantic comedy Solo Mio.

== Personal life ==
Hannigan married her Buffy the Vampire Slayer and Angel co-star Alexis Denisof at Two Bunch Palms Resort in Desert Hot Springs, California, on October 11, 2003. The couple live in Encino, Los Angeles, with their two daughters. Their home was used as a set for This Is Us.

== Filmography ==
=== Film ===
Year	Title	Role	Notes
1986	Impure Thoughts	Patty Stubbs	Credited as Allison Hannigan
1988	My Stepmother Is an Alien	Jessie Mills	
1998	Dead Man on Campus	Lucy	
1999	Hayley Wagner, Star	Jenna Jakes	
1999	American Pie	Michelle Flaherty	
2000	Boys and Girls	Betty	
2001	Beyond the City Limits	Lexi	
2001	American Pie 2	Michelle Flaherty	
2003	American Wedding	Michelle Flaherty	
2006	Date Movie	Julia Jones	
2006	Farce of the Penguins	Hottie Penguin	Voice
2011	Love, Wedding, Marriage	Courtney	
2012	American Reunion	Michelle Levenstein	
2016	Do You Take This Man	Rachael	
2018	You Might Be the Killer	Chuck	
2021	Flora & Ulysses	Phyllis Buckman	
2026	Solo Mio	Meghan	

=== Television ===
Year	Title	Role	Notes
1989–1990	Free Spirit	Jessie Harper	Main role, 14 episodes
1990	Roseanne	Jan	Episode: "Like, a New Job"
1991	Switched at Birth	Gina Twigg (Age 13–16)	Television film
1993	Almost Home	Samantha	2 episodes
1994	Touched by an Angel	Cassie Peters	Episode: "Cassie's Choice"
1995	The Stranger Beside Me	Dana	Television film
1996	For My Daughter's Honor	Kelly	Television film
1996	Picket Fences	Peggy Patterson	Episode: "To Forgive Is Divine"
1997–2003	Buffy the Vampire Slayer	Willow Rosenberg	Main role, 144 episodes
1999–2000	100 Deeds for Eddie McDowd	Gigi	Voice, 3 episodes
2000	The Wild Thornberrys	Gerda	Voice, episode: "Every Little Bit Alps"
2001–2003	Angel	Willow Rosenberg	3 episodes
2002–2003	Rugrats	Cynthia P.I./Young Starlet	Voice, 3 episodes
2004	That '70s Show	Suzy Simpson	2 episodes
2004	King of the Hill	Stacey Gibson	Voice, episode: "Talking Shop"
2005	Veronica Mars	Trina Echolls	3 episodes
2005–2014	How I Met Your Mother	Lily Aldrin	Main role, 206 episodes
2009	The Goode Family	Michelle	Voice, episode: "Graffiti in Greenville"
2010	Food Network Challenge	Herself	Host; Episode: "Outrageous Pumpkins 2"
2011	The Simpsons	Melody	Voice, episode: "Flaming Moe"
2011, 2018	Robot Chicken	Various voices	2 episodes
2011; 2013; 2023	American Dad!	Chelsea	Voice, episode: "Virtual In-Stanity"
2011; 2013; 2023	American Dad!	Ugly Stepsister #2	Voice, episode: "Finger Lenting Good"
2011; 2013; 2023	American Dad!	Lexie	Voice, episode: "Cow I Met Your Moo-ther"
2014	Sofia the First	Winter	Voice, episode: "Winter's Gift"
2014	The McCarthys	Pam	Episode: "Red Sox Swap"
2016–2023	Penn & Teller: Fool Us	Herself	Host, 103 episodes
2018–2022	Fancy Nancy	Claire Clancy	Voice, main role (57 episodes)
2019	Kim Possible	Ann Possible	Television film
2019	Pure	Esther Dunkel	2 episodes
2019	Abducted: The Mary Stauffer Story	Mary Stauffer	Television film
2020–2021	Outrageous Pumpkins	Herself	Host, 8 episodes
2020	Girl Scout Cookie Championship	Herself	Host, 4 episodes
2020	Outmatched	Annabeth	Episode: "Couple's Friends"
2021	Martha Gets Down and Dirty	Herself	Episode: "House Planting Party"
2021	Adorableness	Herself	Panelist
2023	Doogie Kameāloha, M.D.	Dawn	Episode: "Message from the Chief"
2023	Office Race	Pat	Comedy Central original television film
2023	Dancing with the Stars	Contestant	Contestant on season 32; 11 episodes
2024	Beat Bobby Flay	Contestant	Episode: "Sweet Defeat"

=== Video games ===
Year	Title	Role	Notes
2002	Buffy the Vampire Slayer	Willow Rosenberg	

=== Stage ===
Year	Title	Role	Theatre
2004	When Harry Met Sally...	Sally Albright	Theatre Royal Haymarket

== Awards and nominations ==
Year	Award	Category	Nominated work	Result
1989	Young Artist Award	Best Young Actress in a Motion Picture – Comedy or Fantasy	My Stepmother Is an Alien	Nominated
1990	Young Artist Award	Best Young Actress Starring in a Television Series	Free Spirit	Nominated
2000	Young Hollywood Awards	Best Ensemble Cast	American Pie	Won
2000	Teen Choice Awards	Choice TV Sidekick	Buffy the Vampire Slayer	Nominated
2001	Saturn Awards	Best Supporting Actress on Television	Buffy the Vampire Slayer	Nominated
2001	Teen Choice Awards	Choice TV Sidekick	Buffy the Vampire Slayer	Nominated
2002	Saturn Awards	Best Supporting Actress on Television	Buffy the Vampire Slayer	Won
2002	Teen Choice Awards	Choice TV Sidekick	Buffy the Vampire Slayer	Won
2003	Saturn Awards	Best Supporting Actress on Television	Buffy the Vampire Slayer	Nominated
2003	Satellite Awards	Best Supporting Actress – Television Series	Buffy the Vampire Slayer	Nominated
2003	Teen Choice Awards	Choice TV Sidekick	Buffy the Vampire Slayer	Nominated
2004	Teen Choice Awards	Choice Movie Actress – Comedy	American Wedding	Nominated
2004	Teen Choice Awards	Choice Movie Liplock (shared with Jason Biggs)	American Wedding	Nominated
2008	Teen Choice Awards	Choice TV Show – Comedy	How I Met Your Mother	Nominated
2009	People's Choice Awards	Favorite TV Comedy Actress	How I Met Your Mother	Won
2010	People's Choice Awards	Favorite TV Comedy Actress	How I Met Your Mother	Nominated
2012	Teen Choice Awards	Choice Movie Actress: Romantic ComedyChoice Movie Actress – Comedy Comedy	American Reunion	Nominated
2014	People's Choice Awards	Favorite TV Gal Pals (shared with Cobie Smulders)	How I Met Your Mother	Nominated
