= Science Software =

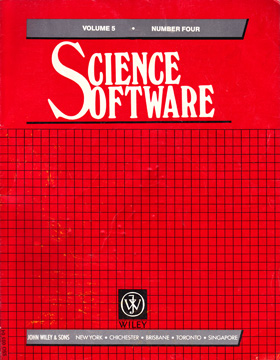
- Discipline: Computer science
- Language: English
- Edited by: Diana Gabaldon

Publication details
- Former name: Science Software Quarterly
- History: 1985–1990
- Publisher: Arizona State University, John Wiley & Sons, Inc.
- Frequency: Quarterly

Standard abbreviations
- ISO 4: Sci. Softw.

Indexing
- ISSN: 0893-9101

The Science Software (formerly Science Software Quarterly) was a scientific journal for scientists of all disciplines who used computers in the 1980s, particularly desktop platforms such as the IBM PC (introduced in 1981), Macintosh (introduced in 1984), and Apple II (introduced in 1977). The journal featured reviews of scientific applications and other software that were available at the time for many different disciplines and branches of science. Each issue also contained articles about scientific computing and regular features. Available by individual subscription, SSQ was published quarterly, or four times per year. Each issue contained about 110 pages.

== History ==
Science Software Quarterly was founded in 1984 by executive editor Diana Gabaldon, who at the time was an assistant professor in the Center for Environmental Studies at Arizona State University. SSQ was first published by ASU. In 1987, the journal was acquired by a new publisher, John Wiley & Sons, who changed the title to Science Software. The software reviews and articles in the journal were not peer-reviewed.

On the new market for scientific software in 1986, Gabaldon wrote, "Within the last year, scientific and technical computer users have emerged as a significant vertical market." But scientists had been using personal computers before their market was discovered. "This means that computer-using scientists were frequently forced to write their own software if they wanted something specific to their needs." SSQ helped acquaint scientists with the newest software applications on the market and provided evaluations from peers, who reviewed the products.

== Scientist reviewers ==
Authors of the SSQ reviews were volunteer scientists who were experts in their field, selected by the executive editor. For software applications new on the market, the scientist reviewer would install and use the product in his or her work, and then evaluate it. Or a scientist could choose to write a review of software that he or she was already using. Manufacturers supplied a current copy of the software free of charge to each reviewer.

== Contents ==
=== Software reviews ===
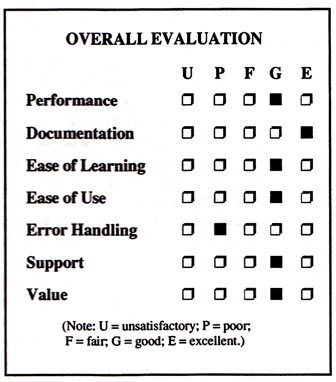
Example of an SSQ Evaluation Box

SSQ scientist reviewers would install, learn to use, then evaluate a software package based on the following categories:

- Performance
- Documentation
- Ease of Learning
- Ease of Use
- Error handling
- Support provided from the software company
- Value

Reviewers would write a section on each category above within the review. A checkbox graphic for each review article allowed readers to see at a glance the reviewer's marks for each of the four categories, giving ratings of Unsatisfactory, Poor, Fair, Good, or Excellent.

The review articles would begin with a listing of the vendor for the software, the current price, and the system requirements, which included the type of computer platform, operating system version, minimum RAM (memory) needed, etc. for the software to work properly.

=== Articles ===
Articles of interest to scientists using computers were included in SSQ and Science Software on a wide range of topics, such as "Transferring BASIC programs From the Apple II to the IBM-PC." In this example, converting data from one operating system to another was explored and explained, which could be a difficult problem in the 1980s.

=== Other features ===
Besides the software reviews, the backbone of SSQ and Science Software, each issue contained:

- An editorial article
- Letters to the Editors
- A Readers' Survey, which provided feedback to the editor on what readers liked about SSQ and what they wanted to see in future issues.

=== Features ===
The features section of the journal contained a variety of information each month, including:

- "New Products and Software in Development," which listed what was new, interesting or updated in hardware and software.
- "Books in Brief" gave a quick look at recent and relevant computer titles.
- "Database Profiles," condensed information on the latest in online and primed database resources.
- "The Wanted List," a listing service that allowed readers to post requests for information or a special software package.
- "Users' Groups," a listing to help readers find other people who shared their interests.
- "On the Periphery," which listed and described computer resources, including peripherals, addons, training videotapes, classes, demos, and "anything onelse on the periphery of scientific computing."

=== Recent References ===
The Recent References section listed articles that might be of interest to scientists using desktop computers, from a wide variety of sources. Articles were listed by author.

=== Published software reviews ===
The published software reviews section listed scientific software reviews in other journals that might be of interest to readers. Examples:

- TERMDOK—Multilingual Technical Dictionary. Raitt, D: Online Review 12:304-315, 1988.
- Microsoft Word, Version 4.0. Small, GW: Journal of Chemical Information and Computer Sciences 28: 234–235, 1988.

== Availability ==
When published, copies were available to individual subscribers by regular mail. Science Software Quarterly was discontinued in 1990. To date, an archive of the journal has not been established on the World Wide Web.
