= Outlander (novel) =

1991 novel by Diana Gabaldon

- First edition cover
- Author: Diana Gabaldon
- Language: English
- Series: Outlander series
- Genre: Historical fiction Romance; Science fantasy
- Published: June 1, 1991
- Publisher: Delacorte Books
- Publication place: United States
- Media type: Print (hardcover)
- Pages: 850
- ISBN: 0-385-30230-4
- OCLC: 22509186
- Followed by: Dragonfly in Amber

Outlander (published in the United Kingdom as Cross Stitch) is a historical fantasy novel by American writer Diana Gabaldon, first published in 1991. Initially set around the time of the Second World War, it focuses on nurse Claire Beauchamp, who travels through time to 18th-century Scotland, where she finds adventure and romance with the dashing Jamie Fraser. It is the first novel in the Outlander series, which is set to comprise ten books, nine of which have already been published. The television adaptation of the series premiered on Starz in the US on August 9, 2014.

A mix of several genres, the series has elements of historical fiction, romance, adventure and traditional fantasy. It has sold over 25 million copies. The first book won a Romance Writers of America's RITA Award in 1992.

== Plot summary ==
In 1946, (Note: The edition published in the UK is set in 1946; however, the editions published in North America are set in 1945. See Development section.) after working apart during the Second World War, former British Army nurse Claire Randall and her husband Frank Randall, a history professor, go on a second honeymoon to Inverness, Scotland. Frank conducts research into his family history and Claire goes plant-gathering near a stone circle on the hill of Craigh na Dun. Investigating a buzzing noise near the stones, she touches one and faints; upon waking, she encounters Frank's ancestor, Captain Jack Randall. Before Captain Randall can attack her, he is knocked unconscious by a highlander who takes Claire to his clansmen. As the Scots inexpertly attend their injured comrade Jamie, Claire uses her medical skill to set Jamie's dislocated shoulder. The men identify themselves as members of Clan MacKenzie, and Claire eventually concludes that she has traveled into the past. She represents herself as an English widow who is traveling to France to see her family. The Scots do not believe her and take her to Castle Leoch, where Claire searches for a way to return to her own time.

The highlanders of 1743 see Claire as a "Sassenach", or "Outlander", ignorant of Gaelic culture. Her medical skills eventually earn their respect; but the clan chieftain, Colum MacKenzie, suspects her of being a government spy. Colum sends her with his brother, Dougal, to collect rents; on the way he also solicits donations for the Jacobites, overseen by Ned Gowan, a lawyer from Edinburgh who is working for the Clan.

When chance again brings her to his attention, Captain Randall tells Dougal to bring Claire to him for questioning. There is suspicion that she is perhaps a spy. To keep Claire from Randall, Dougal has her wed Jamie, which makes her a Scottish citizen. Torn between her attachment to Jamie and the thought of Frank, Claire tries to return to Craigh na Dun. However, she is captured by Randall's men, requiring Jamie to rescue her. Upon returning to Castle Leoch, Claire continues acting as the official healer, and befriends Geillis Duncan, the wife of a local official, who shares a knowledge of medicine. Eventually Claire and Geillis are charged with witchcraft while Jamie is away, but Jamie returns in time to save Claire. While imprisoned with Geillis, Claire learns that Geillis is part of the plot to restore King James to the Scottish throne along with Dougal and that she is also pregnant with his child. Just before their escape, Claire realizes that Geillis is, like herself, from the future, when she sees a smallpox vaccine scar on her arm. Geillis also sees Claire's scar.

Claire tells Jamie her real story, and he takes her to Craigh na Dun. When he offers her the chance to stay or go, she decides to stay. Jamie takes her to his home of Lallybroch, where they meet Jamie's sister Jenny and her husband, Ian. Though Jamie is still a fugitive from the government, he reclaims his position as Laird of Lallybroch, until one of his tenants betrays him and he is taken to Wentworth Prison. Claire and the MacKenzie clansmen attempt to rescue him, but they fail, and Claire is captured by Randall, who threatens to have her raped. Jamie offers himself in Claire's place, and Randall frees Claire into the woods. Claire tells Randall that she is a witch and tells him the exact day of his death, which she knows from Frank's family history. Thereafter Claire is befriended by Sir Marcus MacRannoch, a former suitor of Jamie's mother. While MacRannoch's men distract Wentworth's guards, the clansmen drive a herd of cattle through the underground halls, trampling a man. They rescue Jamie, who has been assaulted physically and sexually by Randall, and take him to MacRannoch's stronghold, where Claire tends Jamie's wounds. As soon as Jamie is able, they and Jamie's godfather, Murtagh, escape to Saint Anne de Beaupre's monastery in France, where another of Jamie's uncles is abbot. As she and Jamie emerge from a sacred hot spring under the Abbey, Claire reveals that she is pregnant.

== Main characters ==
- Claire Beauchamp Randall Fraser: A warm, practical and independent former combat nurse who inadvertently travels back in time to the Scottish Highlands in the mid-18th century. Though married to Frank Randall in the 20th century, she falls for Jamie Fraser in the 18th century. A gifted natural physician and an amateur botanist, Claire is an only child and orphan, raised by her archaeologist uncle.
- James "Jamie" MacKenzie Fraser (a.k.a. Jamie MacTavish): A strapping young Scottish redhead with a complicated past and disarming sense of humor. Jamie is intelligent, principled, and, by 18th century standards, educated and worldly. He picks up languages very easily, and after initial conflict he falls in love with the mysterious Claire. Though he does not always know what she is doing, Jamie usually trusts Claire.
- Franklin “Frank” Wolverton Randall: Claire's husband in the 20th century and a history professor with a deep interest in his genealogy and heritage. He worked for MI6 during the Second World War as an intelligence agent.
- Jonathan Randall (a.k.a. "Black Jack" Randall): The primary villain of the story and Frank Randall's ancestor, a British army officer. According to Jamie, the “Black” refers to the color of his soul. Jack physically resembles his descendant Frank, but has a sadistic sexual obsession with Jamie.
- Callum (Colum) MacKenzie: Chief of the MacKenzie clan and Jamie's maternal uncle, who shelters Jamie and Claire from the government troops. He suffers from Toulouse-Lautrec Syndrome.
- Dougal MacKenzie: Callum's younger Jacobite brother, who leads the clan in battle because his older brother is disabled. It is hinted that he might be the biological father of Callum's son, Hamish. He also took Jamie as a foster son for a time as a teen. Dougal has four daughters with his wife, and a son with Geillis Duncan.
- Geillis/Geilie Duncan: The wife of the procurator fiscal, who believes that she is a witch, and has knowledge of herbs and plants. Geillis is pregnant with Dougal MacKenzie’s child when imprisoned for witchcraft, which wins her a brief reprieve of her death sentence. She murders her husband, Arthur Duncan. Ultimately Claire realizes that she is a time-traveler from the 1960s.
- Murtagh Fitzgibbons Fraser: Jamie's godfather, who is taciturn, quiet and brave, and very loyal to Jamie, whom he cares for as a son. At first he does not accept Claire, but changes his mind when he sees how much Jamie loves her.
- Laoghaire MacKenzie: A young girl of sixteen who is attracted to Jamie. She sends Claire to Geillis Duncan just prior to the witch trial because she "loves" Jamie and wants him back.

== Development and inspiration ==
Diana Gabaldon planned to write a novel with a historical setting "for practice", but did not have a specific setting in mind until she happened to watch The War Games, a classic Doctor Who serial, on PBS. Her eye was caught by the character Jamie McCrimmon, a young Scot from 1745 played by actor Frazer Hines. The image of the young man in the kilt stayed with her, and she decided to set her novel in 18th century Scotland. She named her male protagonist "Jamie" after the Doctor Who character (however, the surname "Fraser" was not taken from actor Frazer Hines, since the PBS station cut off the programme's credits).

Gabaldon's initial plan was to write a "straight historical novel", but as she began to write the character of Claire, she says the character "promptly took over the story and began telling it herself, making smart-ass modern remarks about everything." Gabaldon decided to make the character a modern woman and determine how she came to be in 18th century Scotland later.

Gabaldon acknowledged a date discrepancy between the American version of the novel, the plot of which begins in 1945, and the British version, which begins in 1946. She explained, "Reay Tannahill, a Scot who kindly proofread the novel before it was published in the UK, said that 1946 would have been a more accurate representation of conditions as I described them in Scotland." Gabaldon was able to rework all of the dates for the UK edition, but the American version was too far along in production to change.

== Reception and awards ==
Publishers Weekly said of Outlander, "Absorbing and heartwarming, this first novel lavishly evokes the land and lore of Scotland, quickening both with realistic characters and a feisty, likable heroine." With 25 million copies sold, Outlander is one of the best-selling book series of all time. The novel won the Romance Writers of America's RITA Award for Best Romance of 1991.

== Television series ==
In June 2013, Starz ordered 16 episodes of a television adaptation, and production began in October 2013 in Scotland. The series premiered in the US on August 9, 2014. It was picked up for a second season on August 15, 2014, and for a third and fourth season on June 1, 2016. On May 9, 2018, Starz renewed the series for a fifth and sixth season.

== Other adaptations ==
In 2010 Gabaldon adapted the first third of Outlander into The Exile: An Outlander Graphic Novel, illustrated by Hoang Nguyen. The same year, a 14-song cycle based on Outlander was released under the title Outlander: The Musical.
