= Santa Olivia =

2009 novel by Jacqueline Carey

- Author: Jacqueline Carey
- Language: English
- Series: Santa Olivia series
- Genre: Science fiction
- Publisher: Grand Central Publishing
- Publication date: May 29, 2009
- Publication place: United States
- Media type: Print (Paperback)
- Pages: 352 pp
- ISBN: 978-0-446-19817-2
- OCLC: 245026015
- Followed by: Saints Astray

Santa Olivia is a novel by Jacqueline Carey, the first in a series that is continued by Saints Astray.

== Plot summary ==
Set in a future dystopia United States, the town of Santa Olivia is effectively a desert war zone where people have no rights and legally no longer exist, with the town's name even being changed simply to "Outpost No. 12". The main character is that of Loup Garron, a daughter of a genetically modified father who was bred by the US military as a weapon and has since escaped to Outpost. He becomes engaged with Loup's mother, a resident of Outpost, but is forced to leave before his daughter is born. Loup grows up to become a boxer in Outpost in order to try to escape and eventually find her father.
