= Banewreaker =

2004 novel by Jacqueline Carey

- Author: Jacqueline Carey
- Language: English
- Series: The Sundering
- Genre: Fantasy
- Publisher: Tor Books
- Publication date: November 1, 2004
- Publication place: United States of America
- Media type: Print (Hardback, Paperback)
- Pages: 432
- ISBN: 0-7653-0521-6
- OCLC: 54974407
- Dewey Decimal: 813/.6 22
- LC Class: PS3603.A74 B35 2004
- Followed by: Godslayer

Banewreaker is a fantasy novel by Jacqueline Carey. It is Carey's fourth novel and the first in The Sundering series. Banewreaker is set in Urulat, inspired by J. R. R. Tolkien's Middle-earth, the setting of The Lord of the Rings.

== Premise ==
The world of Urulat was presided over by the Shapers. Ages ago, the youngest Shaper, Satoris, was condemned by his siblings for sharing his gifts too freely with the race of Men. The resulting war was a devastating cataclysm, after which the side of light lay to one end of an ocean, and Satoris to the other, reviled by even the race of Men.

Satoris rules in the fortress of Darkhaven with his loyal inner circle, striving to protect his people from a world that condemns him. The Commander General of his army is Tanaros Blacksword, a man who fled to Darkhaven when he was betrayed by his people long ago. When rumors stir that the opposing faction seeks to forge a final, devastating alliance to crush him once and for all, Satoris dispatches Tanaros to kidnap Cerelinde, the noble Lady of the Ellylon. In so doing Tanaros must confront his feelings for the side of the light, and for Cerelinde, as his actions will change the fate of the race of Men and of Satoris.

== Influences ==
The novel begins with a quote from John Milton's "Paradise Lost". Carey has acknowledged that Banewreaker was influenced by Tolkien's The Lord of the Rings, as well as the classical tragedy form, revisiting the good versus evil scheme of Tolkien by telling the story as an "epic tragedy" from the perspective of the characters who are perceived by most of Urulat as evil. Carey stated that "it departs from convention in one significant way, which is that it's sympathetic to the losing side, and over the course of the two volumes, the story emerges as one long, colossal tragedy."
