= The Exile: An Outlander Graphic Novel =

2010 graphic novel

Publication information
- Publisher: Del Rey
- Format: One-shot
- Genre: Historical romance
- Publication date: September 2010
- No. of issues: 1

Creative team
- Written by: Diana Gabaldon
- Artist: Hoang Nguyen

The Exile: An Outlander Graphic Novel is a 2010 graphic novel based on Diana Gabaldon's 1991 novel Outlander. Written by Gabaldon with artwork by Hoang Nguyen, the work adapts the first third of Outlander. The Outlander series incorporates elements of historical fiction, romance, mystery, adventure and science fiction/fantasy.

== Plot ==
Retelling the first third of Outlander, the graphic novel follows married World War II nurse Claire Beauchamp Randall, who finds herself transported back in time to Scotland in 1743. There she encounters civil war and the dashing Highland warrior Jamie Fraser. Unlike the source novel, this work is presented from the point of view of Murtagh Fitzgibbons Fraser, Jamie's godfather and sworn protector.

== Characters ==
- Claire Beauchamp-Randall: Married World War II nurse who finds herself transported back in time to 1743 Scotland and ends up marrying Jamie Fraser.
- James "Jamie" Alexander Malcolm MacKenzie Fraser: Young mid-18th century redheaded Highland warrior
- Murtagh Fitzgibbons Fraser: Loyal member of the Clan MacKenzie-Fraser who has sworn to protect Jamie since birth

== Reception ==
Publishers Weekly called The Exile "a disappointment" as a graphic novel, noting that it "suffers under the weight of dialogue intended for a much longer book" and that "scenes that ought to be exciting, such as sword fights and escapes from the law are breezed over in a page or two." The review praised Nguyen's artwork and recommended the graphic novel for Gabaldon's fans. Noting Gabaldon's experience as a writer for Disney Comics, Casey Brienza of GraphicNovelsReporter.com wrote that "the marriage of picture and text is a skillful one." Brienza called Nguyen's representations of the characters "dead on" and labeled the work "a credible addition to Gabaldon's literary oeuvre that is certain to become a must-have for loyal readers who are liable to have never picked up a graphic novel before."

The Exile debuted at #1 on The New York Times Best-Seller List for graphic novels, spent three weeks at #1 and remained on the list for 14 weeks.
