= Kushiel's Mercy =

2008 novel by Jacqueline Carey

- Author: Jacqueline Carey
- Cover artist: Cheryl Griesbach and Stanley Martucci
- Language: English
- Series: Imriel Trilogy
- Genre: Fantasy
- Publisher: Warner Books
- Publication date: 12 June 2008
- Publication place: United States
- Media type: Print (Hardback)
- Pages: 653 (hardback)
- ISBN: 0-446-50004-6 (hardback)
- OCLC: 167517577
- Dewey Decimal: 813/.6 22
- LC Class: PS3603.A74 K84 2008
- Preceded by: Kushiel's Justice
- Followed by: Naamah's Kiss

Kushiel's Mercy is a fantasy novel by American writer Jacqueline Carey, the sixth book in her Kushiel's Legacy series. First published in 2008, it is the sequel to Kushiel's Justice, and the final book in the Imriel Trilogy, the second trilogy in the Kushiel's Legacy series.

== Plot summary ==
Sidonie and Imriel confess their love, causing a national uproar. To mitigate the turmoil and quell the uprising, Queen Ysandre decrees that she won't acknowledge the lovers. To appease the Queen, Imriel embarks on a quest to find his mother and return her to the kingdom where she faces treason charges and execution.
