= The Mad Scientist's Guide to World Domination =

2013 short story anthology

- First edition cover
- Editors: John Joseph Adams
- Author: Various
- Cover artist: Ben Templesmith
- Language: English
- Genre: Various
- Published: February 19, 2013
- Publisher: Tor Books
- Publication place: United States
- Media type: Print (hardcover)
- Pages: 368
- ISBN: 0765326442

The Mad Scientist's Guide to World Domination is a short story anthology edited by John Joseph Adams and published by Tor Books on February 19, 2013.

== Contents ==
The collection contains the following stories:

1. Foreword by Chris Claremont
2. "Professor Incognito Apologizes: An Itemized List" by Austin Grossman
3. "Father of the Groom" by Harry Turtledove
4. "Laughter at the Academy" by Seanan McGuire
5. "Letter to the Editor" by David D. Levine
6. "Instead of a Loving Heart" by Jeremiah Tolbert
7. "The Executor" by Daniel H. Wilson
8. "The Angel of Death Has a Business Plan" by Heather Lindsley
9. "Homo Perfectus" by David Farland
10. "Ancient Equations" by L. A. Banks
11. "Rural Singularity" by Alan Dean Foster
12. "Captain Justice Saves the Day" by Genevieve Valentine
13. "The Mad Scientist’s Daughter" by Theodora Goss
14. The Space Between by Diana Gabaldon
15. "Harry and Marlowe Meet the Founder of the Aetherian Revolution" by Carrie Vaughn
16. "Blood & Stardust" by Laird Barron
17. "A More Perfect Union" by L. E. Modesitt, Jr.
18. "Rocks Fall" by Naomi Novik
19. "We Interrupt This Broadcast" by Mary Robinette Kowal
20. "The Last Dignity of Man" by Marjorie M. Liu
21. "The Pittsburgh Technology" by Jeffrey Ford
22. "Mofongo Knows" by Grady Hendrix
23. "The Food Taster’s Boy" by Ben H. Winters
