= Impure Thoughts =

1986 American comedy film

- Directed by: Michael A. Simpson
- Written by: Michael J Malloy; Michael A. Simpson
- Produced by: William VanDerKloot; Michael A. Simpson; Michael J Malloy
- Starring: John Putch; Terry Beaver; Brad Dourif; Lane Davies
- Cinematography: William VanDerKloot
- Edited by: William VanDerKloot
- Music by: James Oliverio
- Distributed by: ASA Communications
- Release date: November 1986
- Running time: 83 minutes
- Country: United States
- Language: English

Impure Thoughts is a 1986 American comedy film. The film was directed by Michael A. Simpson. It marked Alyson Hannigan's feature film debut.

== Plot ==
Four male friends are reunited after not being in contact with each other for several years. However, the meeting place is Purgatory, the afterlife state of limbo between heaven and hell. In Purgatory, these friends reflect on their pasts while they were living. They especially focus on their years in Catholic school and their coming of age.

== Cast ==
- John Putch as Danny Stubbs
- Terry Beaver as William Miller
- Brad Dourif as Kevin Harrington
- Lane Davies as Steve Barrett
- Judith Anderson - narration
- Alyson Hannigan as Patty Stubs (credited as Allison Hannigan)

== Production ==
The budget was less than $500,000.

== Release ==
The film's distributor was based in Springfield, Massachusetts and released the film in the Boston area to tap in to the local Catholic audience. The film opened the week ended November 26, 1986 at Copley Place, grossing $6,000.
