= Sam Sykes =

American writer

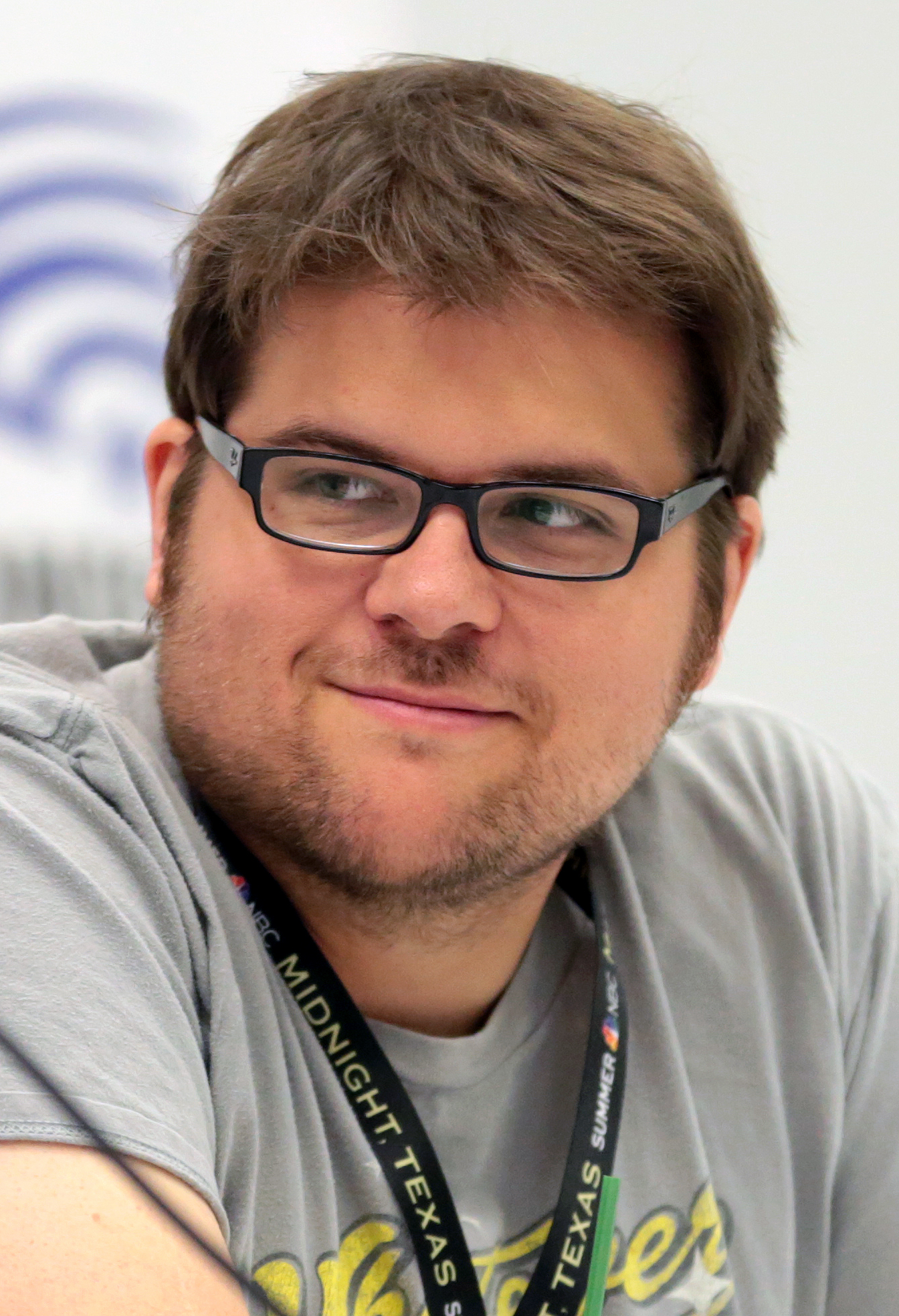
- Sykes at WonderCon 2017
- Born: Sam Watkins
- Occupation: Novelist
- Parent(s): Diana Gabaldon (mother); Doug Watkins (father)
- Relatives: Tony Gabaldon (grandfather)
- Writing career
- Genre: Epic fantasy
- Notable works: Aeons' Gate series; Bring Down Heaven series; The Grave of Empires series
- Website: www.samsykes.com

Sam Watkins is an American epic fantasy writer who publishes fiction as Sam Sykes.

He is the son of Diana Gabaldon, author of the Outlander series.

== Reception ==
His debut trilogy of novels, the Aeons' Gate series, was appreciated by critics for its characterization and dialogue, and for its deconstruction of standard fantasy tropes, but criticized for its meandering, derivative plot.

== Controversy ==
In 2020, multiple authors, including Megan O'Keefe, accused Sykes of making "gross, sexual comments" at various conventions over the years. Sykes issued an apology, acknowledging "the harm [he] caused through [his] vulgar and sexual words, [his] poor judgment and [his] lack of respect for [his] colleagues." In response, his publisher Orbit Books announced that they would not be acquiring further books from Sykes and would not be arranging or supporting any public appearances for Sykes, including at conventions. Both Sykes and Orbit Books pledged to donate a portion of the profits from Sykes' books.

== Bibliography ==
=== Aeons' Gate series ===
- Tome of the Undergates (2010), ISBN 978-1616142421
- Black Halo (2011), ISBN 978-1616143558
- The Skybound Sea (2012), ISBN 978-1616146764
- "Name the Beast", short story in the 2013 cross-genre anthology Dangerous Women

=== Bring Down Heaven series ===
- The City Stained Red (2015)
- The Mortal Tally (2016)
- God's Last Breath (2017)

=== The Grave of Empires series ===
- Seven Blades in Black (April 2019)
- The Gallows Black (May 2019), a short novella set before Seven Blades of Black
- Ten Arrows of Iron (August 2020)
- Three Axes to Fall (December 2022)

=== Pathfinder Tales ===
- Shy Knives (2016)
