= Godslayer =

2006 novel by Jacqueline Carey

- First edition
- Author: Jacqueline Carey
- Cover artist: Donato Giancola
- Language: English
- Series: The Sundering series
- Genre: Fantasy
- Publisher: Tor Books
- Publication date: September 1, 2006
- Publication place: United States
- Media type: Print(Hardback, Paperback)
- Pages: 349 pp
- ISBN: 0-7653-1239-5
- OCLC: 57475847
- Dewey Decimal: 813/.6 22
- LC Class: PS3603.A74 G63 2005
- Preceded by: Banewreaker

Godslayer is a fantasy novel by Jacqueline Carey. It continues the epic tragedy of The Sundering, begun in Banewreaker.
