= Anael (Book of Tobit) =

Brother of Tobit, mentioned in the Bible

Anael is a brother of Tobit in the Book of Tobit, mentioned in Chapter 1 verse 21 of the Greek version.

The verse corresponds to verse 24 in the Latin version (called Tobias), but the Latin version does not mention Anael.

The name means "God has answered" (ענהאל).
