= The Sundering (series) =

Book series by Jacqueline Carey

- Banewreaker; Godslayer
- Author: Jacqueline Carey
- Country: United Kingdom
- Language: English

The Sundering is a series of two fantasy novels by Jacqueline Carey made up of Banewreaker, and Godslayer. The books portray a conflict between light and dark, as in J. R. R. Tolkien's The Lord of the Rings, with The Sundering taking the form of a tragedy where neither side is solely good or evil.

== Novels ==
The Sundering consists of:

1. Banewreaker (2004)
2. Godslayer (2005)

== Introduction ==
Once upon a time, the Seven Shapers dwelled in accord and shaped the world to their will. But Satoris, the youngest among them, was deemed too generous in his gifts to the race of Men, and so began the Shapers' War, which Sundered the world. Now six of the Shapers lay to one end of a vast ocean, and Satoris to the other, reviled by even the race of Men. Satoris has established himself in his citadel of Darkhaven, with his own agents and allies. The rest of the mortal world's inhabitants stand against Satoris, and now some seek to bring about a prophecy that foretells his downfall, primarily through a youth named Dani. Satoris dispatches Tanaros, his trusted Commander General, to end an alliance that would threaten Darkhaven. Tanaros, who originated across the sea before he entered Satoris' service, must grapple with increasingly weighty events as it becomes clear that he could doom Satoris.

== The Shapers ==
Haomane First-Born
The first of the Shapers and has become the leader of the Six in facing the Sunderer. He created the Ellylon, who are immortal except if killed by steel. His Gift is thought, for which he is named Lord-of-Thought. He gave this Gift only to Elyll and Man, making them more intelligent than the other sapient races.
Arahila the Fair
Born-of-the-Heart. Creator of mankind. Her gifts are grace, compassion, and love.
Satoris Third-Born
The leader of the forces of Darkhaven. Once named "The Sower" because of his gift – quickening of the flesh (Reproduction) – His enemies have named him "Banewreaker" and "The Sunderer".
Neheris-of-the-Leaping-Waters
Creator of mountains and the Fjelltroll.
Meronin Fifth-Born
Creator of the deep seas.
Yrinna-of-the-Fruits
Creator of plants and the peaceful Dwarves.
Oronin Last-Born
Creator of Death and the Were.

== Major characters ==
Lord General Tanaros Caveros Blacksword
The main point-of-view character through the series, Darkhaven's military leader. He is one of the Three – lieutenants of Satoris that were made immortal. He came to Satoris after murdering his wife and his king who had an affair and a child together – an act that earned him the name "Kingslayer."
Ushahin Dreamspinner
Another of the Three, Darkhaven's spymaster. A half-breed human/Ellylon, hated by both races and mutilated as a child, he was raised by the Were and now welcomes the insane and unwanted to Darkhaven.
Lord Vorax
A Staccian and one of the Three. Darkhaven's primary diplomat.
Cerelinde
An Ellyon princess and betrothed of Aracus Altorus. Their wedding would fulfill one of the requirements of the prophecy that foretells Satoris' downfall.
Blaise Cavaros
A distant descended relative of General Tanaros. A soldier working for the opponents of Darkhaven, trying to reclaim the honor of his family which was lost long ago when General Tanaros killed his king and defected to Satoris.
Aracus Altorus
Betrothed of Cerelinde. A descendant of the child that Tanaros' wife had had with his King.
Malthus the Wise
A mage, sent long ago by Haomane to defeat Satoris and recover the sword Godslayer. He still bears one of the fragments of the mystic jewel.
Lilias
The Sorceress of Beshtanag who has obtained one of the fragments of the mystic jewel.
Dani the Bearer
A Yarru youth who is key to bringing about the prophecy of Satoris' end. He is the only one who can carry the means of quenching the fires of Darkhaven.
Thulu
A Yarru man, Uncle and guide to Dani
