= Outlander (book series) =

Historical fantasy books by Diana Gabaldon

- Original cover of Outlander (1991), the first novel in the series
- Outlander (1991); Dragonfly in Amber (1992); Voyager (1994); Drums of Autumn (1997); The Fiery Cross (2001); A Breath of Snow and Ashes (2005); An Echo in the Bone (2009); Written in My Own Heart's Blood (2014); Go Tell the Bees That I Am Gone (2021)
- Author: Diana Gabaldon
- Country: United States
- Language: English
- Genre: Historical fiction Fantasy
- Publisher: Delacorte Press
- Published: June 1, 1991–present
- Media type: Print (hardback & paperback); Audiobook
- Followed by: Lord John series

Outlander is a series of historical fantasy novels by American author Diana Gabaldon. Gabaldon began the first volume of the series, Outlander, in the late 1980s; it was published in 1991. She has published nine out of a planned ten volumes. The ninth novel in the series, Go Tell the Bees That I Am Gone, was released on November 23, 2021.

The Outlander series focuses on 20th-century British nurse Claire Randall, who time travels to 18th-century Scotland and finds adventure and romance with the dashing Highland warrior Jamie Fraser. The books have sold over 50 million copies worldwide as of 2021.

Among the many derived works are two short stories, three novellas, a novel series featuring recurring secondary character Lord John Grey, a graphic novel, a musical album, and two television series.

== Publishing history ==
=== Outlander novel series ===
==== Novels ====
1. Outlander (1991) (published in the UK, New Zealand and Australia as Cross Stitch)
2. Dragonfly in Amber (1992)
3. Voyager (1993)
4. Drums of Autumn (1996)
5. The Fiery Cross (2001)
6. A Breath of Snow and Ashes (2005)
7. An Echo in the Bone (2009)
8. Written in My Own Heart's Blood (2014)
9. Go Tell the Bees That I Am Gone (2021)

In May 2025, Gabaldon said on social media that the tenth novel, which she has suggested could be the final one in the series, would be titled A Blessing for a Warrior Going Out.

==== Audiobooks ====
The Outlander series has been released in both unabridged (read by Davina Porter) and abridged audiobooks (read by Geraldine James). The unabridged versions of the audiobooks have also been recorded by Kristin Atherton, who plays Jenny Murray in Season 7 of the Outlander TV series. Several of the Lord John books have been released in audiobook form, read by Jeff Woodman.

=== Novellas and short stories ===
- "A Leaf on the Wind of All Hallows" (2010), a short story in the anthology Songs of Love and Death, later collected in A Trail of Fire (2012), and Seven Stones to Stand or Fall (2017). It tells the WWII story of Roger MacKenzie Wakefield's parents Jerry and Dolly, as Jerry discovers for himself the mystery of the stones.
- "The Space Between" (2013), a novella in the anthology The Mad Scientist's Guide to World Domination, later collected in A Trail of Fire (2012), and Seven Stones to Stand or Fall (2017). It chronicles a journey undertaken by Joan MacKimmie (Jamie Fraser's step-daughter) and Michael Murray (Jenny Fraser Murray's son).
- "Virgins" (2013), a novella in the anthology Dangerous Women, later available as a standalone e-book, and collected in Seven Stones to Stand or Fall (2017). Set in 1740 France, it introduces 19-year-old Jamie Fraser as he and his 20-year-old friend Ian Murray become young mercenaries.
- "Past Prologue" (2017), a short story published in the anthology MatchUp. It is written as a collaboration by Steve Berry and Diana Gabaldon, in a story that crosses over their two fictional universes, with Cotton Malone from Berry's novels meeting Jamie Fraser.
- "A Fugitive Green" (2017), a novella published in the Gabaldon collection Seven Stones to Stand or Fall. It features Hal Grey, brother of Lord John Grey, and his future wife Minerva.

=== Graphic novel ===
In 2010, Gabaldon adapted the first third of Outlander into a graphic novel, illustrated by Hoang Nguyen.

=== Lord John series ===
The Lord John series is a sequence of novels and shorter works that center on Lord John Grey, a recurring secondary character from the Outlander novels. The spin-off series consists of five novellas and three novels, which all take place between 1756 and 1761, during the events of Gabaldon's Voyager. They can be generally categorized as historical mysteries, and the three novels are shorter and focus on fewer plot threads than the main Outlander books. Several of the Lord John books have been released in audiobook form, read by Jeff Woodman.

=== Other ===
- The Outlandish Companion (1999), a guide to the Outlander series containing synopses, a character guide, and other notes and information; revised and updated as The Outlandish Companion (Volume One) (2015)
- The Outlandish Companion (Volume Two) (2015)

== Inspiration ==
Gabaldon was inspired by the Doctor Who character Jamie McCrimmon to set her series in Jacobite Scotland, and to name its protagonist Jamie.

This character wore a kilt, which I thought rather fetching, and demonstrated—in this particular episode—a form of pigheaded male gallantry that I've always found endearing: the strong urge on the part of a man to protect a woman, even though he may realize that she's plainly capable of looking after herself.

Frazer Hines, who played McCrimmon, appears in an episode of the first season of the television series Outlander.

== Characters ==
Core characters include:

- Claire Beauchamp Randall Fraser, the titular Outlander, a 20th-century nurse (and later doctor) who travels through time to the 18th century
- James 'Jamie' Alexander Malcolm MacKenzie Fraser, Claire's 18th-century husband
- Frank Randall, Claire's 20th-century husband
- Brianna Mackenzie, Claire and Jamie's second daughter, an engineer, married to Roger
- Roger Wakefield Mackenzie, a 20th-century historian, later minister, husband to Brianna
- Lord John Grey, a secondary character in the main series and the focus of the spin-off Lord John series

== Musical ==
In 2010, a 14-song cycle based on Outlander was released under the title Outlander: The Musical. With music by Kevin Walsh and lyrics by Mike Gibb, the project was approved by Gabaldon after Gibb had approached the author in Scotland with the idea to adapt her novel into a stage production. As Gabaldon recalled, "I laughed and said, 'That’s the screwiest idea I’ve heard yet – go ahead.' So they did, and the results were stunning." Though the stage production remains in development, the 14-song cycle is available on CD from Amazon.com and for download on iTunes.

In 2012, Broadway composer Jill Santoriello began collaborating with Gibb and Walsh on the project, writing the music and cowriting the lyrics with Gibb for a new song called "One More Time." The song was recorded with vocals by Rebecca Robbins.

== Television series ==
In June 2013, Starz ordered 16 episodes of a television adaptation, and production began in October 2013 in Scotland. The series premiered in the US on August 9, 2014, with Caitríona Balfe and Sam Heughan starring as Claire and Jamie. It was picked up for a second season on August 15, 2014, and for a third and fourth season on June 1, 2016. On May 9, 2018, Starz renewed the series for a fifth and sixth season. Further renewals for seventh and eighth seasons were announced in early 2021 and late 2022 respectively.

In January 2023, Starz greenlit a 10-episode prequel series, Outlander: Blood of My Blood, based on Jamie's and Claire’s parents. Gabaldon is an executive producer.

== Accolades ==
In November 2025, Diana Gabaldon donated the literary archive for the Outlander series of novels to the Cushing Memorial Library and Archives at Texas A&M University in College Station, TX. Galabaldon's works will be added to the Science Fiction and Fantasy Research Collection which includes works by George R.R. Martin, Martha Wells, and Kristen Britain. In addition to preserving Gabaldon's works, the library plans to make the works available to students and scholars conducting research.
