= Jacqueline Carey =

American fiction writer

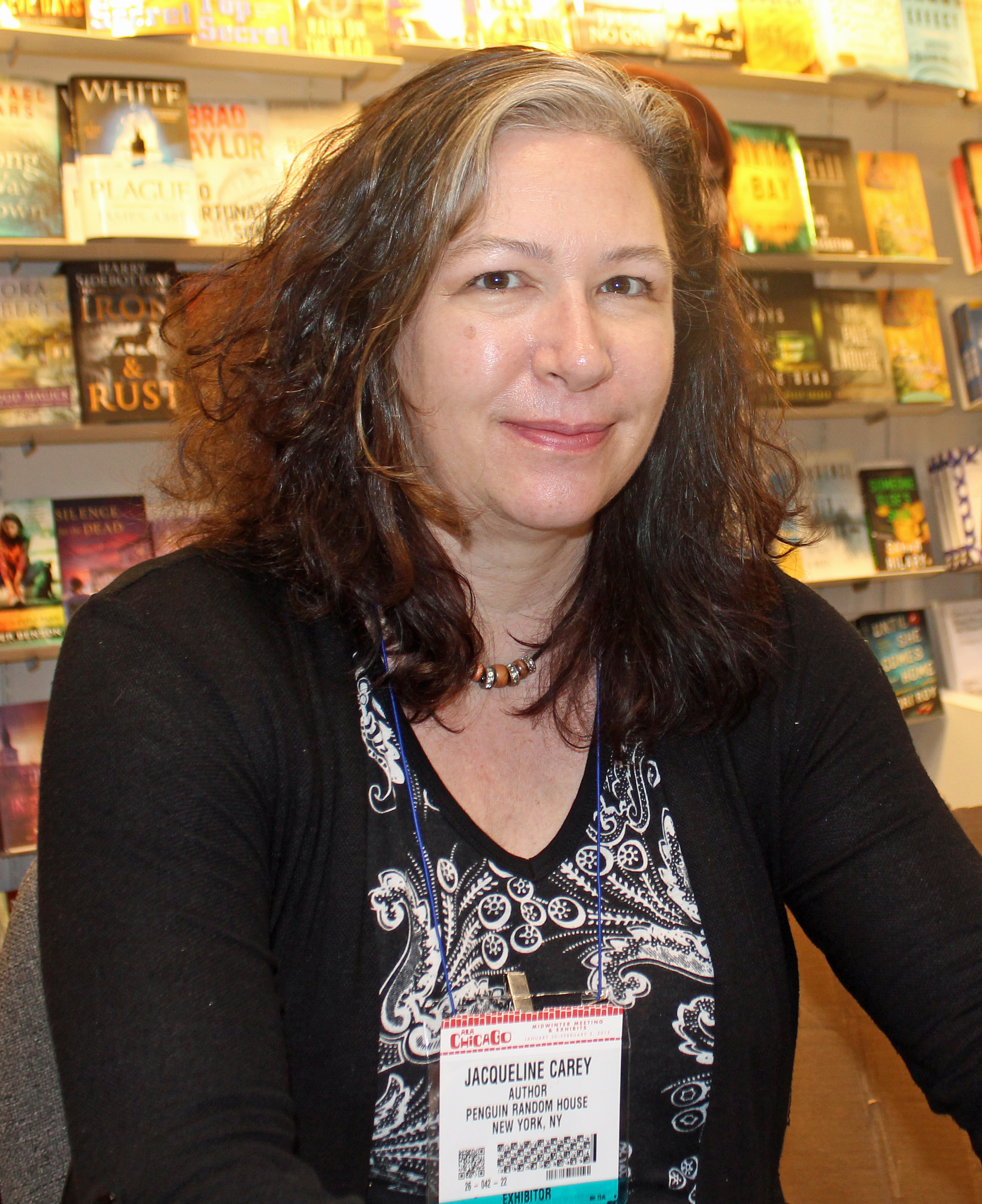
- Born: Jacqueline A. Carey; October 9, 1964 (age 61); Highland Park, Illinois, U.S.
- Education: Lake Forest College (BA)
- Occupation: Novelist
- Writing career
- Genre: Fantasy
- Notable work: Kushiel's Legacy series
- Notable awards: 2002 Locus Award for Best First Novel
- Website: jacquelinecarey.com

Jacqueline A. Carey (born October 9, 1964) is an American writer, primarily of fantasy fiction.

== Biography ==
Carey was born in Highland Park, Illinois, and attended Lake Forest College, both in the northern suburbs of Chicago. She received B.A. degrees in psychology and English literature in 1986. During college she spent 6 months working in a London bookstore as part of a work exchange program, where she decided to write professionally. After returning she started her writing career while working at the art center of a local college. After ten years, she discovered success with the publication of her first book in 2001. Currently, Carey lives in Saugatuck, Michigan and is a member of the oldest Mardi Gras krewe in the state.

== Career ==
=== Writing ===
Carey's literary work has been recognized and highlighted at Michigan State University in their Michigan Writers Series.

== Works ==
=== Terre D'Ange ===
Her first novel was Kushiel's Dart, published by Tor Books in 2001, and the recipient of the 2002 Locus Award for Best First Novel. The Kushiel's Legacy trilogy, completed with Kushiel's Chosen and Kushiel's Avatar, follows the story of a courtesan in a historical fantasy or alternate history (Terre d'Ange) society that follows a demi-god, Elua, whose precept is "Love as thou wilt". The map of Terre d'Ange, the "Land of the Angels," bears a striking resemblance to that of France. Fictional versions of Greece, Great Britain, Italy, Germany, and Spain also figure prominently in the series. Elua was born when the blood of Yeshua ben Yosef, the son of the one God, mingled with the tears of the Magdelene and carried in the womb of Mother Earth. With Elua's peaceful wanderings and the one God's rejection of him, seven angels then rejected God to become Elua's companions on Earth. These angels and Elua himself then founded a nation and comingled with humans before leaving. D'Angelines are the people from their descent.

The first trilogy, Kushiel's Legacy, begins with the story of Phèdre nò Delaunay, a courtesan's 'flawed' and unwanted daughter who is sold into indentured servitude. The first book of the trilogy, Kushiel's Dart, was retold from the point of view of Joscelin Verreuil, a warrior and protector of Phèdre, in a later addition to the trilogy titled Cassiel's Servant, published in 2023.

The second trilogy (named Treason's Heir in the UK and frequently dubbed the Imriel Trilogy in North America), is a continuation of the storyline started in Kushiel's Legacy. The main protagonist is Imriel nò Montrève de la Courcel, third in line for the throne of Terre d'Ange and adopted son of Phèdre nò Delaunay de Montrève.

The third trilogy, whose third novel Naamah's Blessing came out in June 2011, takes place a century after both trilogies and features the protagonist Moirin of the Maghuinn Dhon. Moirin is half-D'Angeline and half of the Maghuin Donn. She is touched by the blessing of Naamah as well as her diadh-anam, the bear-goddess of the Maghuin Dhonn. After a terrible accident and the revelation that her father is a priest of Naamah, Moirin sets sail for Terre d'Ange in search of a destiny her bear-goddess has foretold. Instead of a seemingly clear destiny, Moirin finds herself in an entanglement of court intrigue, scandal and passion. Tossed between the Queen and her courtier, Moirin must decide which path to take before she bleeds dry in the process. She also meets Lo Feng, a sort-of priest of Ch'in, present day China. Feng teaches our heroine the five styles of breathing and offers a respite from her complicated court life. In following her destiny, she will also follow Feng and his young apprentice across yet another ocean where she will meet a princess possessed by a dragon. This is just the first test Moirin will encounter along her destiny's path. She discovers through her diadh-anam that her true love has never been far away. She will travel through cities, deserts and vast areas in an attempt to join the two together. Through her travels, she will always remember that she still has unfinished business back in Terre d'Ange before she can ever hope to see her mother again.

According to Publishers Weekly, "Carey's triumph as a writer lies in her ability to turn these stock—nearly stereotyped—components into an engaging, fascinating novel."

=== Other ===
Carey's second fantasy series is The Sundering, consisting of Banewreaker, published in 2004, and Godslayer, published in 2005. It is a story in the vein of J. R. R. Tolkien's The Lord of the Rings, but told as a tragedy from the point of view of the "dark" side.

Carey's third series begins with Santa Olivia, published in 2009 and concludes with its sequel, Saints Astray, in 2011. Through a Facebook contest, Carey offered fans the chance to choose a new name for the sequel to Santa Olivia, as her publishers were not happy with the working title. The new title of Saints Astray was announced on her Facebook fan page on August 27, 2010.

Carey's first standalone novel, Miranda and Caliban was published in 2017. It's a retelling of William Shakespeare's The Tempest, about Prospero's daughter Miranda and her friendship with the strange, feral boy Caliban.

== Bibliography ==
=== Fiction ===
- Kushiel's Legacy series
  - Phèdre Trilogy
    - 1 Kushiel's Dart (June 2001)
    - 2 Kushiel's Chosen (April 2002)
    - 3 Kushiel's Avatar (April 2003)
  - Imriel Trilogy
    - 1 Kushiel's Scion (June 2006)
    - 2 Kushiel's Justice (June 2007)
    - 3 Kushiel's Mercy (June 2008)
  - Moirin Trilogy
    - 1 Naamah's Kiss (June 2009)
    - 2 Naamah's Curse (June 2010)
    - 3 Naamah's Blessing (June 2011)
  - Extra books
    - Earth Begotten (April 2003) limited edition companion book
    - Cassiel's Servant (August 2023)
- The Sundering series
  - 1 Banewreaker (November 2004)
  - 2 Godslayer (August 2005)
- Santa Olivia series
  - 1 Santa Olivia (May 2009)
  - 2 Saints Astray (October 2011)
- Agent of Hel series
  - 1 Dark Currents (October 2012)
  - 2 Autumn Bones (October 2013)
  - 3 Poison Fruit (October 2014)
- Miranda and Caliban (February 2017)
- Starless (June 2018)

==== Short stories ====
- "One Hundred Ablutions" in A Fantasy Medley 3 (2015), edited by Yanni Kuznia
- "The Martyr of the Roses" in Unfettered (2013), edited by Shawn Speakman
- "You and You Alone" in Songs of Love and Death (2010), edited by George R. R. Martin and Gardner Dozois
- "In The Matter of Fallen Angels" in Elemental: The Tsunami Relief Anthology (2006), edited by Steven Savile and Alethea Kontis
- "The Isle of Women" in Emerald Magic: Great Tales of Irish Fantasy (2004), edited by the Rev. Andrew Greeley
- "Jazznight" in I-94: A Collection of Southwest Michigan Writers (1997), edited by Brett Van Ernst

==== Online archived short stories ====
- "The Peacock Boy,"in The Scroll (issue 4, 1995), edited by Thom O'Connor
- "Actaeon," in The Scroll (issue 6, 1995)
- "The Antedivulians," Prisoners of the Night No. 9 (1995)
- "In the City," in Quanta (1995), edited by Daniel K. Appelquist
- "Bludemagick," in InterText (issue #26, July–August 1995), edited by Jason Snell
- "What Bled Through the Wall," in Clique of the Tomb Beetle (1996)

=== Non-fiction ===
- Angels: Celestial Spirits in Legend & Art (1997)

== Awards ==
- 2002 Locus Award for Best First Novel for Kushiel's Dart
- 2001 Romantic Times Reviewers' Choice Award, Best Fantasy Novel for Kushiel's Dart
- Barnes & Noble, Top Ten Science Fiction & Fantasy of 2001 for Kushiel's Dart
- Amazon.com Editors, Top Ten Fantasy of 2001 for Kushiel's Dart
- Borders, Top Ten Fantasy of 2002 for Kushiel's Chosen
- Amazon.com Editors, Top Ten Fantasy of 2003 for Kushiel's Avatar
