= Kushiel's Legacy =

Series of fantasy novels by Jacqueline Carey

- Kushiel's Dart; Kushiel's Chosen; Kushiel's Avatar; Kushiel's Scion; Kushiel's Justice; Kushiel's Mercy
- Author: Jacqueline Carey
- Country: United States of America
- Language: English
- Followed by: Moirin Trilogy

Kushiel's Legacy is a series of fantasy novels by American writer Jacqueline Carey, comprising the Phèdre Trilogy and the Imriel Trilogy (called the "Treason's Heir" trilogy in the United Kingdom). Since the series features a fictional version of medieval Western Europe, it can be considered historical fantasy or alternate history.

== Novels ==
Kushiel's Legacy consists of the following novels (with release dates). This is also the chronological order within the story.

- Phèdre Trilogy series follows the story of Phèdre nó Delaunay
  - 1 Kushiel's Dart (June 2001)
  - 2 Kushiel's Chosen (April 2002)
  - 3 Kushiel's Avatar (April 2003)
- Cassiel's Servant (August 2023), a retelling of the events of Kushiel's Dart from Joscelin Verreuil's point of view
- Imriel Trilogy series (UK title: Treason's Heir trilogy) follows the story of Imriel nó Montreve de la Courcel
  - 1 Kushiel's Scion (June 2006)
  - 2 Kushiel's Justice (June 2007)
  - 3 Kushiel's Mercy (June 2008)
- Moirin Trilogy series follows the story of Moirin of the Maghuin Dhonn, more than a century after the events of Kushiel's Mercy
  - 1 Naamah's Kiss (June 2009)
  - 2 Naamah's Curse (June 2010)
  - 3 Naamah's Blessing (June 2011)

The names for Kushiel's Chosen and Kushiel's Avatar were initially to be Naamah's Servant and Elua's Child respectively. This was changed for continuity and branding. Similarly, the initial title of Naamah's Kiss had been Naamah's Gift, but was changed prior to publication.

There is a short story in the compendium Songs of Love and Death (2010), entitled "You and You Alone". It chronicles the story of Delaunay, Phedre's foster father and mentor, and Rolande de la Courcel.

== Alternate history ==
In the series, the Roman Empire (called the Tiberian Empire) had fallen due to internal conflict instead of the barbarian invasions, and the Germanic peoples were kept at bay to the east of the Rhine (called Rhenus with its Latin name). Paul the Apostle did not live to form Christianity and followers of Jesus (called Yeshua ben Yosef) live as a sect of Messianic Judaism known as the Yeshuites. An offshoot from Yeshuites, led by a descendant of Jesus and his angel companions, had made its foothold in Gaul after a long period of exile and persecution. Their creed, based on the apotheosis of early angelic founders, predominates in the country now known as Terre d'Ange.

== Companion material ==
Cover of Earth Begotten

Earth Begotten is a companion book to Jacqueline Carey's Kushiel's Legacy fantasy series. It is essentially a prelude to the tales of Terre d'Ange and explores the mythology and origins of Blessed Elua and his seven angelic companions. While the story is very short, fewer than 1500 words, it builds on references to Elua and His Companions throughout the series and elaborates on Elua's conception and ascension to the "true Terre d'Ange that lies beyond".

Earth Begotten was published in April, 2003 by Havilah Press. A strictly limited run of 50 copies was produced to ensure that the bound version remained a collector's item. The book is printed in silver ink on black paper in Centaur type. The pages were printed by hand using a Columbian hand press. The outer boards are veneered in wood that has been treated with silver pigment and lined with scarlet endpapers.

The full text is available on Jacqueline Carey's website.

== Background ==
The main setting of Kushiel's Legacy is the country of Terre d'Ange, the "Land of the Angels". D'Angelines, as the citizens are called, are descended from Blessed Elua and his band of fallen angels. Elua was born when the blood of the crucified Yeshua ben Yosef, the son of the One God, mixed with the tears of the Magdalene and then was quickened by Mother Earth. Scorned by his grandfather, the One God, Elua wandered the Earth with eight companion angels. The eight were Naamah, Anael, Azza, Shemhazai, Camael, Cassiel, Eisheth, and Kushiel. After years of wandering, Elua and his companions settled in the land that would become Terre d'Ange. Elua espoused the precept "Love as thou wilt" and he and his companions inter-bred with the native populace, creating the D'Angeline people. Elua himself is a cross between Dionysus and a wandering fertility god associated with nature, love, and liberty.

Kushiel's Legacy is set about one thousand years after the time of Elua, and the D'Angeline people worship him and his eight companions as gods. They live by his precept, "Love as thou wilt," and, since Naamah sold her body at times to support Elua during their wanderings, consider prostitution to be a sacred service. This service is regulated by its own guild. Furthermore, to serve in the Court of Night-Blooming Flowers, composed of several Houses, each with their own interpretation of Naamah's reasons for prostituting herself, is regarded as the highest pinnacle in Naamah's Service.

Terre d'Ange is divided into seven provinces, each with a companion as its patron deity. Cassiel, who eschewed mortal love and never fully rejected the One God, is the only companion without a province. The Cassiline Brotherhood, however, follows the ways and philosophy of Cassiel and have a prominent role in d'Angeline society. Naamah (patron Goddess of the Night Court) is the patron of Namarre, Anael of L'Agnace, Azza of Azzalle, Shemhazai of Siovale, Camael of Camlach, Eisheth of Eisande, and Kushiel of Kusheth.

The royal House Courcel rules Terre D'Ange from the City of Elua in L'Agnace. At the beginning of the series relations are generally good with Terre d'Ange's neighboring countries of Aragonia, Caerdicca Unitas, and distant Khebbel-im-Akkad. Skaldia, however, has long sought to conquer the D'Angelines. They also have good relations with Alba and Eire though scarce given the impact of the Master of the Straits.

The heroine of the first three installments of the series is anguissette Phèdre nó Delaunay, whose unique talents lead her to save her nation from several terrible fates. The second trilogy of the series follows Imriel nó Montrève de la Courcel, Phèdre's adopted son and Prince of Terre d'Ange in his quest to manhood. The third trilogy within the Kushiel Universe follows Moirin, a half-d'Angeline and half-Alban descendant of House Courcel, approximately 100 years after Kushiel's Legacy.

== Major characters ==
Phèdre nó Delaunay
the heroine of the first trilogy, an anguissette.
Anafiel Delaunay
Phèdre's mentor and foster father.
Alcuin nó Delaunay
Phèdre's foster brother.
Joscelin Verreuil
Phèdre's Cassiline bodyguard.
Hyacinthe
a Tsingano, Phèdre's longtime friend.
Melisande Shahrizai
a D'Angeline noblewoman.
Ysandre de la Courcel
queen of Terre d'Ange.
Drustan mab Necthana
Cruarch ruler of Alba.
Waldemar Selig
leader of Skaldia.
