= Lord John series =

Mystery novels by Diana Gabaldon

- First stand-alone print cover, Hell-Fire Club (1998)
- Lord John and the Hellfire Club (1998); Lord John and the Private Matter (2003); Lord John and the Succubus (2003); Lord John and the Brotherhood of the Blade (2007); Lord John and the Haunted Soldier (2007); The Custom of the Army (2010); The Scottish Prisoner (2011); Lord John and the Plague of Zombies (2011)
- Author: Diana Gabaldon
- Country: United States
- Language: English
- Genre: Historical mystery Gay literature
- Publisher: Delacorte Press
- Published: November 1998 – present
- Media type: Print (Hardcover & Paperback); Audiobook
- Preceded by: Outlander series
- Website: dianagabaldon.com

The Lord John series is a sequence of historical mystery novels and shorter works written by Diana Gabaldon that center on Lord John Grey, a recurring secondary character in the author's Outlander series. Secretly homosexual "in a time when that particular predilection could get one hanged," the character has been called "one of the most complex and interesting" of the hundreds of characters in Gabaldon's Outlander novels. Starting with the 1998 novella Lord John and the Hellfire Club, the Lord John spin-off series currently consists of six novellas and three novels.

== Origins ==
Gabaldon introduced Grey in the second Outlander novel Dragonfly in Amber (1992) as a sixteen-year-old English soldier who chances upon Jamie and Claire Fraser on the eve of the Battle of Prestonpans. The character returns, as an adult, in Voyager (1993) and Drums of Autumn (1996). When Gabaldon was invited to write a short story for the 1998 British anthology Past Poisons: An Ellis Peters Memorial Anthology of Historical Crime, she was interested in the challenge of writing a shorter work but hesitant to use any of the main characters from the Outlander series for fear of creating "a stumbling block in the growth of the next novel." The Lord John character came to mind. She said:

Lord John Grey is an important character in the Outlander series, but he isn't onstage all the time. And when he isn't ... well, plainly he's off leading his life and having adventures elsewhere, and I could write about any of those adventures without causing complications for future novels. Beyond that obvious advantage, Lord John is a fascinating character. He's what I call a 'mushroom'—one of those unplanned people who pops up out of nowhere and walks off with any scene he's in—and he talks to me easily (and wittily). He's also a gay man, in a time when to be homosexual was a capital offense, and Lord John has more than most to lose by discovery. He belongs to a noble family, he's an officer in His Majesty’s Army, and loves both his family and his regiment; to have his private life discovered would damage—if not destroy—both. Consequently, he lives constantly with conflict, which makes him both deeply entertaining and easy to write about.

That first Lord John story became Lord John and the Hellfire Club (1998); it was well-received and Gabaldon decided that she would write more Grey-centric tales in her spare time. Her next attempt was a larger manuscript that secured the author a deal for three full Grey novels: Lord John and the Private Matter (2003), Lord John and the Brotherhood of the Blade (2007) and The Scottish Prisoner (2011). Gabaldon would also write four additional Lord John novellas between 2003 and 2011. Meanwhile, the character of Grey appeared in the Outlander novels A Breath of Snow and Ashes (2005) and An Echo in the Bone (2009), as well as in The Fiery Cross (2001) by way of a series of letters to Jamie and his family. To date, the Lord John works all take place between 1756 and 1761, during the events of Gabaldon's Voyager. They can be generally categorized as historical mysteries, and the three novels are shorter and focus on fewer plot threads than the main Outlander books. Several of the Lord John books have been released in audiobook form, read by Jeff Woodman.

Lord John Grey himself has been called one of Gabaldon's "most complex and interesting" Outlander characters. Publishers Weekly notes Grey to be "a competent and likable sleuth" and a " soldier-hero with secrets of his own." Comfortable with his sexuality but necessarily "discreet", Grey navigates mystery and intrigue "with characteristic élan, intelligence, and fortitude, assisted by jeweled goblets of wine and meaningful glances from fetching men." Robert Silverberg wrote of the character, "A gay man in a time when that particular predilection could get one hanged, Lord John is a man accustomed to keeping secrets. He's also a man of honor and deep affections—whether returned or not."

== Works ==
=== Lord John and the Hellfire Club (1998) ===
Lord John and the Hellfire Club
- Author: Diana Gabaldon
- Published in: Past Poisons
- Publisher: Headline Publishing
- Publication date: 1998
- ISBN: 0747275017

The novella Lord John and the Hellfire Club was originally published in the 1998 British anthology Past Poisons: An Ellis Peters Memorial Anthology of Historical Crime (edited by Maxim Jakubowski), as well as by Bantam Dell as Lord John and the Hell-Fire Club in a "Complimentary Collector's Special Edition" the same year. It was later included in the Lord John and the Hand of Devils collection (2007).

Plot

Set in 1756 London, the novella follows the adventures of Lord John as he stumbles upon the secrets of the Hellfire Club, an underground society concerned with the supernatural. While at the Beefsteak Club, Grey is introduced to Robert Gerald, a cousin by marriage to Grey's friend and colleague, Harry Quarry. Gerald asks Grey to meet him in secret that night, hinting at intrigue, but he is later killed in front of Grey and Quarry before he can divulge the reason for the meeting. The two men begin to search for clues to the murder, and Grey is soon invited to a Hellfire Club meeting by George Everett, one of its members (and one of Grey's former lovers). When Grey attends the meeting at the club's hideout, Medmenham Abbey, he soon discovers that his life might be in danger as well.

=== Lord John and the Private Matter (2003) ===
Lord John and the Private Matter
- Author: Diana Gabaldon
- Publisher: Delacorte Press
- Publication date: 2003
- Pages: 320
- ISBN: 0385337477

The first full-length Lord Grey novel, Lord John and the Private Matter, was published by Delacorte Press on September 30, 2003. Though Gabaldon had intended it to be a novella, Private Matter came in at 320 pages and secured the author a deal for two additional full Grey novels, Lord John and the Brotherhood of the Blade (2007) and The Scottish Prisoner (2011). Private Matter reached #8 on The New York Times Hardcover Fiction Best-Seller List. Publishers Weekly said of the novel, "Grey is a competent and likable sleuth, and Gabaldon's prose is crisply elegant."

Plot

Set in 1757 England, the novel follows Lord John's attempt to resolve a delicate situation involving his cousin's betrothed, Joseph Trevelyan, while searching for the murderer of a fellow soldier suspected of espionage and recovering missing military intelligence. Grey meets and is joined in his investigation by the handsome Hanoverian Captain Stephan von Namtzen, Landgrave of Erdberg, and takes young Tom Byrd into his employ as his valet.

=== Lord John and the Succubus (2003) ===
Lord John and the Succubus
- Author: Diana Gabaldon
- Published in: Legends II
- Publisher: Del Rey Books
- Publication date: 2003
- ISBN: 0-345-45644-0
- OCLC: 42695477

The novella Lord John and the Succubus was originally published in the 2003 Del Rey Books anthology Legends II: New Short Novels by the Masters of Modern Fantasy (edited by Robert Silverberg), and later collected in Lord John and the Hand of Devils (2007).

Plot

Set in 1758, the story finds Lord John in Prussia serving as the English liaison officer to the First Regiment of Hanoverian Foot. Briefly stationed at the town of Gundwitz with a group of English and Hanoverian soldiers, Major Grey is at first skeptical when he receives reports of a local succubus victimizing a number of men and murdering a Prussian soldier. Accompanying the town Buergermeister to a graveyard in his search for the creature's resting place, Grey stumbles upon the corpse of an English soldier, which only feeds the superstitious fears of the soldiers and townspeople. While attempting to solve the mystery, Grey tries to navigate his perhaps-mutual attraction to the dashing Hanoverian Captain Stephan von Namtzen, as well as to deflect the advances of the beautiful young widow Louisa, Princess von Lowenstein, at whose castle both men are staying.

=== Lord John and the Brotherhood of the Blade (2007) ===
Lord John and the Brotherhood of the Blade
- Author: Diana Gabaldon
- Publisher: Delacorte Press
- Publication date: 2007
- Pages: 512
- ISBN: 0385337493

Gabaldon's second full-length Lord John novel, the 512-page Lord John and the Brotherhood of the Blade, was published by Delacorte Press on August 28, 2007. It debuted at #1 on The New York Times Hardcover Fiction Best-Seller List. In a 2007 podcast, Gabaldon noted that each of her books, though complex, "can actually be reduced to a single word that embodies all of the thematic complexity of that book," and that the word for Brotherhood of the Blade is "honor".

Plot

In 1759, Lord John finds that someone has reawakened the long-forgotten scandal of his father's death 17 years earlier, and the old controversy threatens to cause trouble for himself and his elder brother Harold, Earl of Melton. Despite Hal's desire to leave the secrets of the past buried, Grey seeks the help of his old friend Jamie Fraser, whose secrets may both help and complicate Grey's investigations.

=== Lord John and the Haunted Soldier (2007) ===
Lord John and the Haunted Soldier
- Author: Diana Gabaldon
- Published in: Lord John and the Hand of Devils
- Publisher: Delacorte Press
- Publication date: 2007
- ISBN: 0385311397

The novella Lord John and the Haunted Soldier was published in the 2007 Delacorte Press collection Lord John and the Hand of Devils alongside previously published novellas Lord John and the Hellfire Club (1998) and Lord John and the Succubus (2003). As Haunted Soldier is a direct follow-up to her novel Lord John and the Brotherhood of the Blade, Gabaldon pushed the publication of the Hand of Devils collection until after the novel's release.

Plot

Picking up right after the events of Brotherhood of the Blade in 1759, Grey searches for the culprit behind a suspicious cannon explosion as others seek to blame him or his half-brother for the incident.

=== The Custom of the Army (2010) ===
The Custom of the Army
- Author: Diana Gabaldon
- Published in: Warriors
- Publisher: Tor Books
- Publication date: 2010
- ISBN: 978-0765320483

The novella The Custom of the Army was first published in the 2010 Tor Books fantasy anthology Warriors, edited by George R.R. Martin and Gardner Dozois. In May 2012 it became available as a standalone e-book, and was later included in A Trail of Fire, an Outlander collection released in 2012. It was later collected in Seven Stones to Stand or Fall (2017).

Plot

In 1759, Lord John finds himself both about to be promoted within His Majesty's Army and fresh from a gentlemen's duel in which his opponent was killed. Grey gladly accepts an urgent summons from his old friend Charlie Carruthers, who is facing court-martial in Canada.

=== The Scottish Prisoner (2011) ===
The Scottish Prisoner
- Author: Diana Gabaldon
- Publisher: Delacorte Press
- Publication date: 2011
- Pages: 560
- ISBN: 0385337515

Gabaldon's third full-length Lord John novel, the 560-page The Scottish Prisoner, was published by Delacorte Press on November 29, 2011. It debuted at #6 on The New York Times E-Book Fiction Best-Seller List.

Plot

In 1760, Lord John and Jamie Fraser are reunited again as Grey seeks Jamie's help investigating a conspiracy that leads them to Ireland, and danger.

=== Lord John and the Plague of Zombies (2011) ===
Lord John and the Plague of Zombies
- Author: Diana Gabaldon
- Published in: Down These Strange Streets
- Publisher: Ace Books
- Publication date: 2011
- ISBN: 0441020747

The novella Lord John and the Plague of Zombies was first published in the 2011 Ace Books urban fantasy anthology Down These Strange Streets, edited by George R.R. Martin and Gardner Dozois. In April 2013, it became available as a standalone e-book titled A Plague of Zombies, and was later included in A Trail of Fire, an Outlander collection released in the United Kingdom, Australia, and New Zealand in late 2012 and expected to be released in the United States and Canada in early 2014. The novella was nominated for an Edgar Award by the Mystery Writers of America for the “Best Short Mystery Story” of 2011. It was later collected in Seven Stones to Stand or Fall (2017).

Plot

In 1761, Lord John is sent to Jamaica in command of a battalion to put down a slave rebellion and soon finds himself investigating a mystery involving snakes, spiders and zombies.

=== Besieged (2017) ===
Besieged
- Author: Diana Gabaldon
- Published in: Seven Stones to Stand or Fall
- Publisher: Delacorte Press
- Publication date: 2017
- ISBN: 978-0399593420

The novella Besieged was first published in the 2017 Gabaldon collection Seven Stones to Stand or Fall.

Plot

In 1762, Lord John is set to step down as temporary military governor of Jamaica when he learns that his mother is in Havana, Cuba, where the British Navy is headed to lay siege. He departs to rescue her, accompanied by his valet, Tom Byrd, the ex-zombie Rodrigo, and Rodrigo's wife, Azeel.

== Collections ==
=== Lord John and the Hand of Devils (2007) ===
Lord John and the Hand of Devils is a 2007 Delacorte Press collection of the first three Lord John novellas: the previously published Lord John and the Hellfire Club (1998) and Lord John and the Succubus (2003), and the new tale Lord John and the Haunted Soldier, exclusive to this volume. Gabaldon pushed the publication of the collection until after the release of her novel Lord John and the Brotherhood of the Blade, since the action of Haunted Soldier picks up where Brotherhood of the Blade ends. Hand of Devils reached #24 on The New York Times Hardcover Fiction Best-Seller List. Publishers Weekly noted, "Gabaldon brings an effusive joy to her fiction that proves infectious even for readers unfamiliar with her work or the period."

=== A Trail of Fire (2012) ===
A Trail of Fire (Four Outlander Tales) is a collection of Outlander short works released in the United Kingdom, Australia, and New Zealand in late 2012 and expected to be released in the United States and Canada in early 2014. It includes two previously published Lord John novellas, The Custom of the Army (2010) and Lord John and the Plague of Zombies (2011), as well as the previously published Outlander short story "A Leaf on the Wind of All Hallows" (2012) and novella The Space Between (2013). According to Gabaldon, the volume is delayed in the US and Canada until February 2014 when the rights to The Space Between in those areas revert to her.

=== The Lord John Series e-book (2013) ===
In April 2013 Gabaldon released an e-book collection called The Lord John Series featuring all three of her Lord John novels (Lord John and the Private Matter, Lord John and the Brotherhood of the Blade and The Scottish Prisoner) as well as the initial three novellas collected as Lord John and the Hand of Devils (Lord John and the Hellfire Club, Lord John and the Succubus and Lord John and the Haunted Soldier). Though calling itself an omnibus, the collection does not include the previously published Lord John novellas The Custom of the Army (2010) and Lord John and the Plague of Zombies (2011), which appear together in the Outlander collection A Trail of Fire.

== Reception ==
In August 2016, Joanna Robinson of Vanity Fair called Grey "a character so popular, Gabaldon eventually spun him off into his own novels". Lord John and the Private Matter reached #8 on The New York Times Hardcover Fiction Best-Seller List in 2003. Publishers Weekly said of the novel, "Grey is a competent and likable sleuth, and Gabaldon's prose is crisply elegant." In 2007, Lord John and the Brotherhood of the Blade debuted at #1, and the Hand of Devils collection reached #24 on The New York Times Hardcover Fiction Best-Seller List. In a review of Hand of Devils, Publishers Weekly noted, "Gabaldon brings an effusive joy to her fiction that proves infectious even for readers unfamiliar with her work or the period." The Scottish Prisoner debuted at #6 on The New York Times E-Book Fiction Best-Seller List in 2011, and A Plague of Zombies was nominated for an Edgar Award by the Mystery Writers of America for the “Best Short Mystery Story” the same year. Of Scottish Prisoner, Publishers Weekly said, "A complicated plot will likely baffle new readers, but long-time Gabaldon fans will find plenty to love."

The character of Lord John Grey has been called "one of the most complex and interesting" of the hundreds of characters in Gabaldon's Outlander novels. In 2015, Fandomania named him among their "Top 10 Crushworthy LGBT Characters in Sci-Fi/Fantasy".

A television series adaptation of Gabaldon's Outlander series premiered on Starz in 2014, and Executive Producer Ronald D. Moore was asked in March 2015 about the possibility of a Lord John television series. He said, "It's in the back of our minds as a potential thing, but right now our minds are pretty firmly set on just delivering the second season. We'll see what happens down the line on Lord Grey." Oscar Kennedy subsequently portrayed a young Grey in the 2016 season two episode "Je Suis Prest", adapting the character's appearance in Dragonfly in Amber. With the August 2016 casting of David Berry as the adult Grey for season three of the series, Joanna Robinson theorized about the possibility of an eventual spin-off series.
