= Bannerless =

2017 book by Carrie Vaughn

- Author: Carrie Vaughn
- Language: English
- Genre: Post apocalyptic science fiction
- Publisher: Mariner Books, Houghton Mifflin Harcourt
- Publication date: July 11, 2017
- Publication place: United States
- Pages: 272
- ISBN: 978-0-544-94730-6

Bannerless is a 2017 post-apocalyptic novel by Carrie Vaughn. It takes place in the future, within the fictional society of the Coast Road, a network of agrarian communities that arises in California after natural disasters caused a societal collapse.

== Synopsis ==
After climate change causes a series of natural catastrophes, the United States collapses in the Fall. A series of agrarian settlements in California form a new society called the Coast Road. The people of the Coast Road were able to maintain records of life before the Fall as well as basic medical and agricultural knowledge, but have lost most modern technologies.

While socially progressive and egalitarian, the Coast Road implements a number of rules to prevent their society from being overtaxed. Birth control is mandatory and residents must receive permission to reproduce, and causing environmental damage is also prohibited. Rule violations are sought out and punished by investigators, who maintain the rules in the Coast Road. Investigators Enid and Tomas are sent to the small town of Pasadan where a mysterious death has occurred.

== Publication ==
The novel is based on a short story which appeared in Lightspeed.

== Reception ==
The novel received mostly positive reviews from critics. Clay Bonneyman Evans of Colorado Arts and Sciences described it as "a mélange of murder mystery, post-apocalyptic world-building and a serious argument in favor of sustainability and responsible social policy."

Critics praised the novel's premise and worldbuilding for subverting post-apocalyptic tropes which typically feature more cynical characters and dystopian societies. Adrienne Martini of Locus and Liz Bourke of Tor.com praised the characterization of Enid, and the overall community of characters in the book. Martini and Bourke praised the use of flash backs to explore Enid's backstory, while Publishers Weekly felt that "the numerous flashbacks rob the story of its urgency, making this less powerful than it could have been."

The novel won the 2018 Philip K. Dick Award.
