= Past Poisons =

Past Poisons: An Ellis Peters Memorial Anthology of Historical Crime
- First edition cover
- Editors: Maxim Jakubowski
- Author: Various
- Language: English
- Genre: Historical mystery
- Published: 12 November 1998
- Publisher: Headline Publishing
- Publication place: United Kingdom
- Media type: Print (Hardcover)
- Pages: 373
- ISBN: 0747275017

Past Poisons: An Ellis Peters Memorial Anthology of Historical Crime is a 1998 British anthology of historical mystery short stories and novellas, edited by Maxim Jakubowski. The collection is named for novelist Ellis Peters, whose Cadfael Chronicles (1977–1994) are generally credited for popularizing the combined genre of historical fiction and mystery fiction that would become known as historical mystery.

== Contents ==
The anthology includes:

- "A Counter-blast to Tobacco" by Paul C. Doherty
- "Wheel in the Sky" by Edward D. Hoch
- "Starstruck at San Simeon" by Janet Laurence
- "Death by Eros" by Steven Saylor
- "Damned Spot" by Julian Rathbone
- "Showman" by Peter Lovesey
- "The Padder's Lesson" by Molly Brown
- "To Dispose of an Abbot" by Susanna Gregory
- "The Mamur Zapt and the Catherine Wheel" by Michael Pearce
- "The Great Brogonye" by David Howard
- "The Unkindest Cut" by Kate Ross
- "Girl Talk" by Marilyn Todd (1st century BC Rome). A Claudia Seferius short story.
- "Invitation to a Poisoning" by Peter Tremayne
- "The Last High Queen" by Anne Perry
- "To Encourage the Others" by Martin Edwards
- "Psalm for a Dead Disciple" by Edward Marston
- "Handsel Monday" by Catherine Aird
- "An Academic Question" by John Maddox Roberts (51 BC Athens). This short story is an installment of the SPQR series, set immediately prior to the novel The Princess and the Pirates (2005).
- Hellfire (Lord John and the Hellfire Club) by Diana Gabaldon (Late 1750s England). This novella is the first work in the Lord John series, a spin-off of the supporting character Lord John Grey from Gabaldon's Outlander series of historical novels.
- "The Party May Yet be Living" by Lindsey Davis
