= Michael Pearce (author) =

British writer (1933–2022)

Michael Pearce (1933–2022) was a British writer of historical fiction and police procedurals, known for his series of nineteen Mamur Zapt detective novels set in Egypt during the opening years of the 20th century.

Covering a period from approximately 1908 through 1920, the Mamur Zapt novels feature a detective named Gareth Cadwallader Owen whose career and cases reflect the history of British colonialism in the Nile Valley, as well as the history of Egyptology, Coptic Christian and Muslim relations, European privileges via the Capitulations, and more.

== Early life ==
Pearce was raised in Anglo-Egyptian Sudan.

== Career ==
As an adult, he trained as a Russian interpreter during the Cold War, and subsequently became involved with Amnesty International.

His first novel, The Mamur Zapt and the Return of the Carpet, was published in 1988. That was the start of a Mamur Zapt series of mysteries.

Pearce also published a number of A Dead Man in... mysteries, set in the period preceding the First World War and featuring Sandor Seymour, an officer of Scotland Yard's Special Branch who is sent by the British Foreign Office to deal with various crimes involving members of the British diplomatic service. These mysteries are notable for their attention to period details and settings.

Pearce's The Mamur Zapt and the Spoils of Egypt (1992) won the Crime Writers' Association's Last Laugh Award for funniest crime novel, and his Death of an Effendi (1999) was shortlisted for the Ellis Peters Award for best historical crime novel.

== Death ==
Pearce died in 2022.

== Bibliography ==
#	Title	Year	Series
1	The Mamur Zapt and the Return of the Carpet	1988	Mamur Zapt
2	The Mamur Zapt and the Night of the Dog	1989	Mamur Zapt
3	The Mamur Zapt and the Donkey-Vous	1990	Mamur Zapt
4	The Mamur Zapt and the Men Behind	1991	Mamur Zapt
5	The Mamur Zapt and the Girl in the Nile	1992	Mamur Zapt
6	The Mamur Zapt and the Spoils of Egypt	1992	Mamur Zapt
7	The Mamur Zapt and the Camel of Destruction	1993	Mamur Zapt
8	The Snake Catcher's Daughter	1994	Mamur Zapt
9	The Mingrelian Conspiracy	1995	Mamur Zapt
10	The Fig Tree Murder	1997	Mamur Zapt
11	Dmitri and the Milk-Drinkers	1997	Dmitri Kameron'
12	The Last Cut	1998	Mamur Zapt
12a	"The Mamur Zapt and the Catherine Wheel"	1998	Short story, Past Poisons
13	Death of an Effendi	1999	Mamur Zapt
14	Dmitri and the One-Legged Lady	1999	Dmitri Kameron
15	A Cold Touch of Ice	2000	Mamur Zapt
16	The Face in the Cemetery	2001	Mamur Zapt
17	A Dead Man in Trieste	2004	Seymour of Special Branch
18	A Dead Man in Istanbul	2005	Seymour of Special Branch
19	The Point in the Market	2005	Mamur Zapt
20	A Dead Man in Athens	2006	Seymour of Special Branch
21	A Dead Man in Tangier	2007	Seymour of Special Branch
22	A Dead Man in Barcelona	2008	Seymour of Special Branch
23	The Mark of the Pasha	2008	Mamur Zapt
24	A Dead Man in Naples	2009	Seymour of Special Branch
25	A Dead Man in Malta	2010	Seymour of Special Branch
26	The Bride Box	2013	Mamur Zapt
27	The Mouth of the Crocodile	2014	Mamur Zapt
28	The Women of the Souk	2016	Mamur Zapt

(Note that some reprint editions of the Mamur Zapt series retitle the books by dropping the opening phrase "The Mamur Zapt and...".)

== See also ==
- List of British writers
- List of novelists
