= Mamur Zapt =

Historical fiction protagonist

The Mamur Zapt is the protagonist of an award-winning series of historical fiction police procedurals, written by Sudanese-born British novelist Michael Pearce. The novels are set in Cairo at the turn of the twentieth century. Egypt was ruled notionally by a khedive but the British administered the country at the time. Rather than being a specific person, "Mamur Zapt" was the official title of the head of the Cairo secret police. Pearce filled this role with Gareth Cadwallader Owen, a Welsh army captain.

The first in the series, The Mamur Zapt and the Return of the Carpet, was published in 1988.

As of 2016, there are 19 novels in the Mamur Zapt series.

== Titles in the series ==
1. The Mamur Zapt and the Return of the Carpet. Collins Crime. 1988. ISBN 9780002321679.
2. The Mamur Zapt and the Night of the Dog. Collins Crime. 1989. ISBN 9780002322119.
3. The Mamur Zapt and the Donkey-Vous. Collins. 1990. ISBN 978-0002322652.
4. The Mamur Zapt and the Men Behind. Harper Fontana. 1991. ISBN 9780006472667.
5. The Mamur Zapt and the Girl in the Nile. Collins. 1992. ISBN 9780002323680.
6. The Mamur Zapt and the Spoils of Egypt. Collins Crime. 1992. ISBN 9780002324175.
7. The Mamur Zapt and the Camel of Destruction. Collins Crime. 1993. ISBN 9780002324878.
8. The Snake Catcher's Daughter. Collins Crime. 1994. ISBN 9780002325349.
9. The Mingrelian Conspiracy. Collins Crime. 1995. ISBN 9780002325684.
10. The Fig Tree Murder. Collins Crime. 1997. ISBN 9780002326193.
11. The Last Cut. Collins Crime. 1998. ISBN 9780002326582.
12. Death of an Effendi. Collins Crime. 1999. ISBN 9780002326858.
13. A Cold Touch of Ice. Harper Collins. 2000. ISBN 9780002326971.
14. The Face in the Cemetery. Collins Crime. 2001. ISBN 9780002326988.
15. The Point in the Market. Poisoned Pen. 2003. ISBN 9781590581377.
16. The Mark of the Pasha. Poisoned Pen. 2008. ISBN 9781590584446.
17. The Bride Box. Severn House. 2013. ISBN 9780727883032.
18. The Mouth of the Crocodile. Severn House. 2015. ISBN 9780727884633.
19. The Women of the Souk. Severn House. 2016. ISBN 9780727886187.
