= List of Outlander episodes =

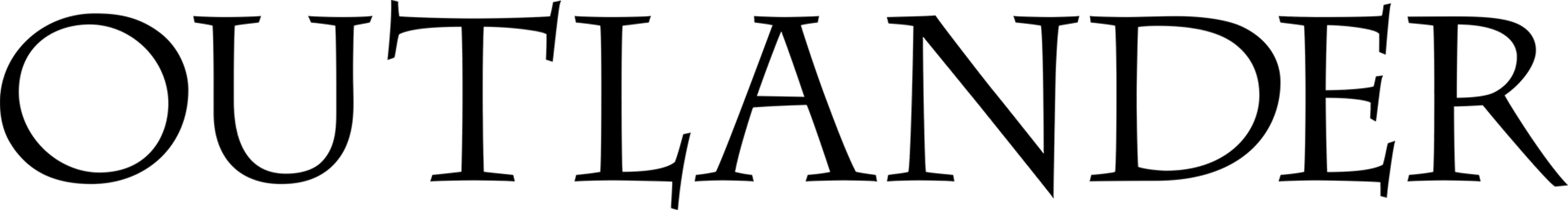

Outlander is a historical drama television series based on the book series of the same name of historical time travel novels by Diana Gabaldon. Developed by Ronald D. Moore and produced by Sony Pictures Television and Left Bank Pictures for Starz, the show premiered on August 9, 2014. It stars Caitríona Balfe as Claire Randall, a married former World War II nurse, later surgeon, who in 1946 finds herself transported back to the Scotland of 1743 where she meets and falls in love with the dashing Highland warrior Jamie Fraser (Sam Heughan) and becomes embroiled in the Jacobite risings.

During the course of the series, 101 episodes of Outlander aired over eight seasons, between August 9, 2014, and May 15, 2026.

== Series overview ==
Season	Episodes		Originally released	
Season	Episodes		First released	Last released
1	16	8	August 9, 2014	September 27, 2014
1	16	8	April 4, 2015	May 30, 2015
2	13		April 9, 2016	July 9, 2016
3	13		September 10, 2017	December 10, 2017
4	13		November 4, 2018	January 27, 2019
5	12		February 16, 2020	May 10, 2020
6	8		March 6, 2022	May 1, 2022
7	16	8	June 16, 2023	August 11, 2023
7	16	8	November 22, 2024	January 17, 2025
8	10		March 6, 2026	May 15, 2026

== Episodes ==
=== Season 1 (2014–2015) ===
No. overall	No. in season	Title	Directed by	Written by	Original release date	U.S. viewers (millions)
Part 1
1	1	"Sassenach"	John Dahl	Ronald D. Moore	August 9, 2014	0.72
In 1945, Claire Randall, a former WWII combat nurse, is visiting Inverness, Scotland, with her husband Frank. The couple are becoming reacquainted after their long wartime separation. Frank is researching his family history, in particular his 18th Century ancestor Jonathan "Black Jack" Randall. The morning after observing a modern Druid ritual at a stone circle on the hill of Craigh na Dun, Claire touches one of the stones, and wakes up lying on the ground. Soon she is in the middle of a skirmish between British government troops and Jacobite Highlanders, and comes face to face with Frank's ancestor, "Black Jack" Randall, who is a captain in the Dragoon Guards. A Scotsman rescues Claire and she meets Jamie Fraser. As they flee, she sets his dislocated arm and later treats his bullet wound. Claire is brought to Castle Leoch, and realises that she has somehow travelled back in time.
2	2	"Castle Leoch"	John Dahl	Ronald D. Moore	August 16, 2014	0.90
Claire is presented to Colum MacKenzie, laird of Castle Leoch, where she learns she has landed in 1743. She eventually realises she is suspected of being a government spy. She meets Geillis Duncan, and witnesses Jamie doing a kindness for Laoghaire, the pretty young granddaughter of Mrs Fitzgibbons. As Claire plans to return to Inverness and the stones, Colum decides it is best to keep her at Leoch, against her will, as healer to the clan.
3	3	"The Way Out"	Brian Kelly	Anne Kenney	August 23, 2014	1.00
Claire hopes that her medical skills will earn the MacKenzies' trust, and her eventual freedom, but only makes herself indispensable. By saving Mrs Fitzgibbons's nephew from poisoning, which the fanatical Father Bain had declared as demonic possession, Claire makes a new enemy. Even though she earns some trust from the MacKenzies, she is called a miracle-worker and is therefore presumed too valuable to let go. After she and Jamie collude to help a youth punished for stealing, Claire is given renewed hope of being able to travel home when she hears a folk tale about a time-traveller and the stones.
4	4	"The Gathering"	Brian Kelly	Matthew B. Roberts	August 30, 2014	0.84
Claire plots her escape during a clan gathering at Leoch, but Jamie convinces her that she would fail. Escorting her back, he finds himself in a dangerous position with Colum that he had been trying to avoid, but manages to make an oath of loyalty while manoeuvering himself out of trouble with his kinsman. Claire earns Dougal's respect while tending a dying man on a boar hunt, and he decides to take her with him on his rent-collecting tour.
5	5	"Rent"	Brian Kelly	Toni Graphia	September 6, 2014	0.95
Claire clashes with Dougal and his men on the rent-collecting journey, especially when Dougal uses Jamie's scars to collect more money from the villagers. A young man, who turn outs to be an army officer, tries unsuccessfully to "free" her from the Jacobites. Later, she realises that they are collecting funds for the Jacobite Army as part of the Jacobite rising. Knowing from history that their cause is doomed, she tries to warn them off. The episode ends with the army officer returning with his troops to retrieve young Claire from the Jacobites.
6	6	"The Garrison Commander"	Brian Kelly	Ira Steven Behr	September 13, 2014	1.10
The soldiers take Claire to meet Brigadier-General Lord Thomas, who promises her safe passage to Inverness in the company of Black Jack Randall. When Thomas leaves, Randall tries to discover why she is in Scotland. She concocts a story and he describes in detail his vicious whipping of young Jamie. Dougal comes to take her away, but Randall insists that he has to deliver Claire to Fort William the following day. They leave, and Dougal tells Claire he does not have to turn her in if she marries Jamie and as a consequence becomes Scottish.
7	7	"The Wedding"	Anna Foerster	Anne Kenney	September 20, 2014	1.23
Claire and Jamie marry to protect her from Randall, and try to get to know each other better afterwards to make the consummation less awkward. They realise their feelings for each other, but Claire is still torn thinking about Frank.
8	8	"Both Sides Now"	Anna Foerster	Ronald D. Moore	September 27, 2014	1.42
In 1946, Frank is losing hope of finding Claire, but goes to the stone circle one last time. In the past, Claire finds herself nearby to the stones and runs for them. She hears Frank calling, and he hears her as well. But Claire is captured by government troops before she can reach the stones, and a despondent Frank leaves as she is taken to Fort William. Claire nearly talks her way out of being interrogated by Randall, but he turns the tables on her. Just as he is about to rape her at knifepoint, Jamie appears in the window.
Part 2
9	9	"The Reckoning"	Richard Clark	Matthew B. Roberts	April 4, 2015	1.22
Jamie saves Claire from Black Jack Randall, but the dynamic of their marriage is tested. Jamie tries to ease the conflict between Colum and Dougal sparked by Claire's rescue. Jamie rebuffs a seduction by Laoghaire, who then leaves a bad luck charm under Claire and Jamie's bed.
10	10	"By the Pricking of My Thumbs"	Richard Clark	Ira Steven Behr	April 11, 2015	0.86
Claire confronts a spiteful Laoghaire, but is surprised to learn that the charm came from Geillis. Jamie petitions the Duke of Sandringham for help to rid himself of Randall and the price on his head, while Claire secretly uses her historical knowledge to leverage his help in Jamie's favour. Dougal is inconsolable after his wife's death from an illness, but Geillis, pregnant with his child, is pleased. When Geillis's husband dies at a banquet for the Duke, Claire realises that Geillis poisoned him. Colum forbids Dougal from pursuing a relationship with Geillis, exiling Dougal to his estate with Jamie in tow. Claire and Geillis are arrested for witchcraft.
11	11	"The Devil's Mark"	Mike Barker	Toni Graphia	April 18, 2015	1.09
Claire and Geillis face charges of witchcraft. Ned Gowan comes to their defence, but witnesses, including Laoghaire and Father Bain, testify against them, and they are found guilty. Before Jamie can fight his way out of the courtroom with his wife, Geillis confesses and exonerates Claire. Claire recognises from the smallpox vaccine scar on Geillis's shoulder that she too is from the future; 1968 to be exact. Geillis is taken to be burned at the stake. When Jamie asks Claire about her scar, she tells him of her time travel. He believes her, takes her back to Craigh na Dun, and wishes her well in returning to her own time. But Claire decides not to go back.
12	12	"Lallybroch"	Mike Barker	Anne Kenney	April 25, 2015	1.11
Jamie takes Claire to his family home of Lallybroch, where he clashes with his strong-willed sister Jenny. Taking up his role as laird, he disrupts the household until Claire sets him straight. After Jamie narrowly avoids a run-in with passing soldiers, he and Jenny make amends.
13	13	"The Watch"	Metin Hüseyin	Toni Graphia	May 2, 2015	1.05
Soldiers of the Black Watch arrive at Lallybroch, and Jamie pretends to be a Fraser cousin. Claire realises that Jenny's impending childbirth will be a dangerous, breech birth, but Jenny swears her to secrecy. An army defector, Horrocks, appears and threatens to reveal that Jamie has a price on his head unless Jamie pays him. Jenny's husband Ian kills Horrocks. Coming clean to Black Watch officer MacQuarrie, Jamie agrees to join their raid. Jenny gives birth to a daughter with Claire's help. Meanwhile, the raiding party is ambushed by government troops who capture Jamie.
14	14	"The Search"	Metin Hüseyin	Matthew B. Roberts	May 9, 2015	1.08
Claire and Jenny set out to find Jamie. They learn he has escaped his captors, and a newly-arrived Murtagh takes Claire on a journey to find him. Their plan is to have Jamie find them by touring the countryside with Claire as a singer called "The Sassenach". They attract Dougal's attention, and he tells them that Jamie has been recaptured and tried, and is awaiting execution at Wentworth Prison. Claire makes a deal with Dougal that she will marry him if she couldn't save Jamie from execution. She then convinces three of Dougal's men, including Willie, to help her rescue Jamie.
15	15	"Wentworth Prison"	Anna Foerster	Ira Steven Behr	May 16, 2015	1.01
Randall appears at Wentworth Prison and tortures Jamie, seeking his submission. Meanwhile, Claire gets into the prison to save her husband. When Randall catches her, Jamie submits to rape by Randall in exchange for her freedom. Before she leaves, Claire "curses" Randall and tells him what will be the date of his death. When all seems lost, Murtagh comes up with a plan to rescue Jamie.
16	16	"To Ransom a Man's Soul"	Anna Foerster	Ira Steven Behr & Ronald D. Moore	May 30, 2015	0.98
Murtagh's rescue is successful and Randall left for dead, but Jamie remains tortured by his ordeal. As Claire tends to his injuries, Jamie is tormented by memory of his rape and torture. He asks for Willie's blade to end his life. Claire makes her "time traveller" confession to Father Anselm at the abbey and he absolves her. Claire convinces Jamie by reminding the promise he made when they got married and tells him that she will have him in any way that she can and if he wishes to die she will die with him. Murtagh accompanies them as they set sail for safety in France, where Claire hopes to meet Charles Stuart and somehow prevent the catastrophic Battle of Culloden. As they set sail, Claire tells Jamie that she is pregnant.

=== Season 2 (2016) ===
No. overall	No. in season	Title	Directed by	Written by	Original release date	U.S. viewers (millions)
17	1	"Through a Glass, Darkly"	Metin Hüseyin	Ronald D. Moore	April 9, 2016	1.46
Claire awakes at Craigh Na Dun in 1948. Grieving over Jamie's assumed death in battle, she is reunited with Frank, who cannot understand her reappearance but is desperate to reconcile. Claire explains where and when she has been, including her marriage with Jamie and that she is carrying his child. Initially furious and heartbroken, Frank promises that they will raise the child together and resume married life. She later recalls her arrival with Jamie to France, where they make contact with Jamie's Jacobite cousin Jared Fraser, and make an enemy of the Comte St. Germain.
18	2	"Not in Scotland Anymore"	Metin Hüseyin	Ira Steven Behr	April 16, 2016	1.24
In 1744, Claire and Jamie have settled in Paris, ostensibly working for Jared but actually seeking to foil the Jacobite rebellion. Jared arranges for Jamie to meet with Prince Charles Edward Stuart himself, but Jamie cannot deter him from planning to seize the British throne for his father. Claire secures an invitation to the Palace of Versailles, where she hopes to meet Louis XV and thwart his funding of the Jacobite cause. The Frasers make an impression, and are reunited with the Duke of Sandringham. Claire is shocked to learn that Randall is still alive, and is not sure if she should tell Jamie.
19	3	"Useful Occupations and Deceptions"	Metin Hüseyin	Anne Kenney	April 23, 2016	1.21
While Jamie continues to try and sour the financing of Prince Charles's rebellion, Claire makes herself useful at L'Hôpital des Anges, a charity hospital run by the imperious Mother Hildegarde. Jamie meets a 10-year-old boy at a brothel, hires him to pick messages from pockets, adopts him, and names him Fergus. Claire and Jamie discover that Sandringham is helping Charles secure funds from English aristocrats, which Jamie hopes to thwart. Though spending time with Sandringham will surely reveal to Jamie that Randall is alive, Claire cannot bear to tell Jamie herself.
20	4	"La Dame Blanche"	Douglas Mackinnon	Toni Graphia	April 30, 2016	1.17
Claire finally tells Jamie about Randall, and the potential for vengeance reinvigorates Jamie. Claire suspects the Comte St. Germain when an attempt is made on her life, and she and Jamie plan a dinner party to paint Charles and his cause in a bad light to Sandringham. Murtagh, Claire and the young Mary Hawkins are attacked on their way to the party, and Mary is raped. Back at the house, the party goes as planned until a misunderstanding sparks a brawl. At the party, the Duke of Sandringham relates a story of his trip to see Pope Benedict XIV who refused to see him.
21	5	"Untimely Resurrection"	Douglas Mackinnon	Richard Kahan	May 7, 2016	1.13
The disastrous dinner party has discouraged Charles's investors, but the prince finds a new one in Jamie's enemy, St. Germain. Charles puts Jamie and St. Germain into business together, to their concern. Trying to preserve Frank's lineage, Claire sabotages the blossoming relationship between Mary Hawkins and Alex Randall. Black Jack Randall appears at Versailles, and Jamie challenges him to a duel. Jamie is angry when Claire forces him to swear that he will not harm Randall until he has conceived a child with Mary.
22	6	"Best Laid Schemes..."	Metin Hüseyin	Matthew B. Roberts	May 14, 2016	1.03
Jamie tells Murtagh the truth about Claire's past. Claire uses her medical knowledge to give St. Germain's men symptoms that resemble those of smallpox. Jamie and Murtagh then steal the Comte's wine shipment, seemingly dashing Charles's hopes. Fate brings Jamie and Randall face to face, and Claire arrives just in time to see them duelling. As Jamie stabs Randall and gendarmes arrive to arrest them, a pregnant Claire collapses, bleeding.
23	7	"Faith"	Metin Hüseyin	Toni Graphia	May 21, 2016	1.10
Claire and Jamie's daughter is stillborn, and a devastated Claire nearly dies from fever. With Jamie in the Bastille, Claire discovers that he duelled with Randall because he had discovered him raping Fergus. Claire seeks mercy for Jamie from the king, who forces her to decide the fates of suspected "sorcerers" Master Raymond and St. Germain. She contrives to save them, but Raymond poisons St. Germain. Claire submits sexually to the king in exchange for Jamie's freedom. She and Jamie reconcile, and they visit their daughter Faith's grave before leaving Paris for Scotland.
24	8	"The Fox's Lair"	Mike Barker	Anne Kenney	May 28, 2016	1.06
In Scotland, Jamie finds himself compelled to support the Jacobite rebellion. He and Claire seek military assistance from his grandfather, Lord Lovat, and are reunited with Colum and Laoghaire. Colum hopes to discourage the rebellion, which he is certain will fail. Laoghaire begs Claire's forgiveness, and later agrees to help Claire and Jamie manipulate Lovat. Playing both sides, Lovat promises peace to Colum, but also sends Jamie some troops as reinforcements.
25	9	"Je Suis Prest"	Philip John	Matthew B. Roberts	June 4, 2016	0.94
Claire and Jamie are reunited with Angus, Rupert and Dougal. As Jamie and Murtagh attempt to train Lovat's men, the camps remind Claire of her traumatic experiences in World War II. She and Jamie later coerce young scout William Grey to reveal vital information about the government army nearby.
26	10	"Prestonpans"	Philip John	Ira Steven Behr	June 11, 2016	0.82
Jamie and the Jacobite army fight the Battle of Prestonpans. Surprising their enemies in the fog, the Jacobites are victorious, but Angus later dies of his injuries.
27	11	"Vengeance Is Mine"	Mike Barker	Diana Gabaldon	June 18, 2016	0.86
When Claire, Jamie and their party are surrounded by government soldiers, Claire pretends to be a hostage of the Jacobites so Dougal can negotiate their safe passage. Taken to "safety", Claire finds herself face to face with the Duke of Sandringham and his goddaughter Mary Hawkins. She also recognises Sandringham's valet, Danton, as the man who had raped Mary. Sandringham intends to lure "Red Jamie" to save Claire, and then turn them both over to the authorities. Forewarned, Jamie and Murtagh slip into the castle. Mary kills Danton, and Murtagh beheads Sandringham to fulfill his promise to Claire and Mary to avenge their attack in Paris.
28	12	"The Hail Mary"	Philip John	Ira Steven Behr & Anne Kenney	June 25, 2016	1.05
Jamie tries to avoid the Battle of Culloden by launching a preemptive strike against the government troops while they are celebrating the Duke of Cumberland's birthday, but the Prince gets lost in the dark. Claire finds herself trying to convince Randall to marry Mary, who is pregnant with a dying Alex's child. A dying Colum asks Claire to help him end his life painlessly. Before she does, he tells her that Geillis was not burned at the stake until after her child with Dougal was born, and that the child was adopted into the MacKenzie clan.
29	13	"Dragonfly in Amber"	Philip John	Toni Graphia & Matthew B. Roberts	July 9, 2016	1.15
In 1968, fifty-year-old Claire is reunited with Reverend Wakefield's adopted son, Roger, in Inverness. Her twenty-year-old daughter, Brianna, discovers that she is not Frank's biological daughter, but refuses to believe her mother's tale of time travel. Meanwhile, Brianna meets Scottish independence activist Gillian Edgars, whom Claire later recognises is Geillis Duncan. Before the battle of Culloden in 1746, Jamie and Claire are forced to kill Dougal when he overhears their last-ditch plot to kill the Prince. Jamie insists that Claire save herself and their unborn child by travelling back through the stones, and she is utterly heartbroken at the thought of leaving him. They arrive at the stones as the battle begins, and bid each other an emotional farewell. Back in 1968, Claire realises Roger is a descendant of Geillis and Dougal. To prevent Gillian's death, they try to stop her from travelling back through time. They arrive too late, but seeing Gillian disappear into the stone convinces Brianna that her mother is telling the truth. Roger reveals to Claire that Jamie did not die at Culloden.

=== Season 3 (2017) ===
No. overall	No. in season	Title	Directed by	Written by	Original release date	U.S. viewers (millions)
30	1	"The Battle Joined"	Brendan Maher	Ronald D. Moore	September 10, 2017	1.49
In 1948, a pregnant Claire moves to Boston with Frank. Their relationship is tense, and she struggles to adjust to her new life as a housewife. She gives birth to Jamie's daughter. In 1746, Jamie finally kills Jack Randall at the battle of Culloden. Jamie and Rupert survive the battle and take refuge in a farm house with other Jacobites, but Jamie's wounds are grave. They are caught by redcoats, and Rupert is executed. Just as Jamie's turn comes, he is recognised by Lord Melton, the elder brother of the boy—John Grey—whose life Jamie spared before Prestonpans. Bound by honour, Melton secretly removes Jamie from the farm house and sends him home to Broch Tuarach, expecting him to die en route.
31	2	"Surrender"	Jennifer Getzinger	Anne Kenney	September 17, 2017	1.40
Baby Brianna has brought Claire and Frank closer, but the memory of Jamie stands between them. Searching for fulfillment, Claire enrolls in medical school as the only woman in her class. Jamie, still struggling to come to terms with life without Claire, has survived for six years at Lallybroch, but with the authorities still searching for him, he lives in a cave as an outlaw. Soldiers come to Lallybroch repeatedly, harassing Jenny and Ian for information about Jamie's whereabouts. When Fergus loses a hand in a run-in with a group of soldiers, Jamie arranges to be "caught", so that Jenny can claim the reward and the authorities will leave his family alone.
32	3	"All Debts Paid"	Brendan Maher	Matthew B. Roberts	September 24, 2017	1.55
Claire graduates from medical school. Years later as Brianna graduates high school, Frank tells Claire he wants a divorce so he can marry his mistress and return to England. They are poised to argue over where Brianna will live, but Frank is killed in a car accident. Jamie is serving time in Ardsmuir Prison, where he is the leader and spokesman for Jacobite prisoners of war. His uneasy relationship with the new governor, an adult Lord John Grey, evolves into friendship. When the prison is shuttered, Murtagh and the rest of the prisoners are sent to the American colonies as indentured servants, while John paroles Jamie to work at a private estate called Helwater.
33	4	"Of Lost Things"	Brendan Maher	Toni Graphia	October 1, 2017	1.59
Claire and Brianna, with the help of Roger Mackenzie, research history to track Jamie to Ardsmuir, but when the trail runs cold, they return to America. Serving as a groom for the Dunsany family, Jamie is blackmailed into sex by heiress Geneva. When she and her earl husband die, leaving their newborn son Willie an orphan, Geneva's sister Isobel keeps the secret that the child is really Jamie's. Years later, when the young earl's resemblance to him is becoming obvious, Jamie leaves Helwater, with Willie in the care of Isobel and Lord John, who are engaged to be married.
34	5	"Freedom & Whisky"	Brendan Maher	Toni Graphia	October 8, 2017	1.60
In December 1968, Roger arrives in Boston having discovered a clue to Jamie's whereabouts in 1765. Brianna urges Claire to go back and reunite with Jamie, and mother and daughter have a tearful farewell. In Edinburgh in 1765, Claire finds Jamie in a print shop.
35	6	"A. Malcolm"	Norma Bailey	Matthew B. Roberts	October 22, 2017	1.72
Claire and Jamie are reunited. She shares photos of Brianna, and he tells Claire about his son Willie. She also learns that Jamie prints subversive material, smuggles wine and spirits, and lives in a brothel owned by his associate, Madame Jeanne. Claire is reunited with an adult Fergus and delighted to meet Jenny's son, Young Ian. Claire and Jamie spend the night at the brothel, re-consummating their marriage and their love for each other. While Jamie is out on a business errand, Claire finds herself in danger from a rummaging intruder who threatens to have his way with her. Claire fights back, resulting in a sudden "catastrophe".
36	7	"Crème de Menthe"	Norma Bailey	Karen Campbell	October 29, 2017	1.52
Dodging a blade, Claire's attacker trips and falls, suffering a critical head injury. Refusing to let him die, Claire insists an attempted trepanation but is unable to save his life. Ian arrives desperately looking for his son, Young Ian. Jamie claims he has not seen the boy, though young Ian has surreptitiously been working for him smuggling alcohol. Interrupting his very first romp with a lass, Young Ian is confronted by an intruder at the print shop, who discovers Jamie's treasonous pamphlets. In the melee, the shop is soon consumed by fire, but Jamie saves the boy.
37	8	"First Wife"	Jennifer Getzinger	Joy Blake	November 5, 2017	1.64
Jamie takes Claire and young Ian home to Lallybroch. Claire is enraged and threatens to leave when she discovers that Jamie has married a twice widowed Laoghaire. She also struggles to regain the trust of Jenny, who is suspicious of her return and still oblivious to the truth of Claire's origins. Laoghaire accidentally shoots Jamie during a confrontation with him and Claire. Jamie recovers thanks to the penicillin that Claire has brought, and he explains to her his reasons for marrying Laoghaire. Ned Gowan negotiates a settlement with Laoghaire, and Jamie decides to retrieve the treasure on Silky Isle to pay for it. Young Ian swims to the island in an injured Jamie's place. Jamie and Claire are horrified to see the boy forcibly taken aboard a ship and carried away after finding the treasure.
38	9	"The Doldrums"	David Moore	Shannon Goss	November 12, 2017	1.49
Learning in France that young Ian's ship is heading for Jamaica, Claire and Jamie pursue it on a trading ship, the Artemis. At sea, Fergus reveals that Laoghaire's daughter Marsali is aboard, and they seek Jamie's approval for their marriage. The ship loses wind and the crew is about to kill one of Jamie's men as a "Jonah" (man of bad luck) when the wind returns. The Royal Navy warship HMS Porpoise stops them and seeks help, her crew stricken with a plague. Claire determines that the disease is typhoid fever and trains them to stop its spread, but the ship carries her off with the captain's promise to leave her in Jamaica to wait for the Artemis.
39	10	"Heaven and Earth"	David Moore	Luke Schelhaas	November 19, 2017	1.23
On the Porpoise, Claire struggles against suspicion from some of the crew, but eventually manages to stop the spread of the disease. She discovers that the captain knows Jamie's true identity and plans to have him arrested in Jamaica for treason and murder. When they go ashore, she tries to escape but is apprehended by the captain. That night at sea, a woman named Annejke encourages Claire to jump overboard using an empty barrel as a raft, as the current will carry her towards land. Meanwhile, on the Artemis, Jamie is confined after threatening the captain, wanting him to sail faster in pursuit of the Porpoise. He tries to get Fergus to help him take control of the ship, but Fergus instead persuades the captain to let Jamie rejoin the crew after he promises not to mutiny again.
40	11	"Uncharted"	Charlotte Brandström	Karen Campbell & Shannon Goss	November 26, 2017	1.40
Claire swims ashore, and walks inland, struggling to survive the harsh tropical environment. She is found and taken in by Father Fogden, a runaway priest. In passing, he tells her of a cave in Jamaica where people have been known to disappear. A few days later, the Artemis reaches the island, needing to make repairs after a storm, her captain having died. As the ship is about to sail, Claire attracts Jamie's attention from the beach using a mirror, and they are reunited. Back on the island, Fogden marries Fergus and Marsali. The next day, Jamie, Claire and the crew set sail for Jamaica.
41	12	"The Bakra"	Charlotte Brandström	Luke Schelhaas	December 3, 2017	1.51
Geillis is holding Young Ian prisoner in Jamaica. She makes him drink tea that compels him to tell the truth about Jamie and the treasure. Jamie and Claire reach the island, and Claire gets into an altercation at the slave market. Jamie buys her the slave, Temeraire, to defuse the situation. They attend a ball thrown by the new governor, whom they discover is Lord John. Claire is reunited with Geillis, who offers to help with their search. At the ball, Margaret Campbell prophesies that a king will rule Scotland again when a two-hundred-year-old child is killed. Fergus sees Captain Leonard arrive, and warns Jamie, who flees. Temeraire tells Claire and Jamie that Geillis is holding Ian. On their way to Geillis's villa, Jamie is arrested by Leonard.
42	13	"Eye of the Storm"	Matthew B. Roberts	Matthew B. Roberts & Toni Graphia	December 10, 2017	1.43
Claire is captured whilst searching Geillis's slave houses for Ian. The governor's troops recover Jamie from Captain Leonard, and Lord John sets Jamie free after Leonard is unable to produce any evidence of his alleged crimes. Meanwhile, Claire tells Geillis about her return to the 20th century, and Geillis realises that it is Claire's child who must die before Scotland gains its new king. Jamie frees Claire, and they rescue Ian from Geillis, who is killed by Claire during the struggle. The group sets sail from Jamaica, but are shipwrecked in a storm. Jamie saves Claire from drowning, and they are washed up together on the shore of the Province of Georgia in British America.

=== Season 4 (2018–2019) ===
No. overall	No. in season	Title	Directed by	Written by	Original release date	U.S. viewers (millions)
43	1	"America the Beautiful"	Julian Holmes	Matthew B. Roberts & Toni Graphia	November 4, 2018	1.08
In North Carolina, Jamie and Claire plan to sell Geillis's gemstones to pay for everyone's passage back to Scotland. They help thief Stephen Bonnet, who has fled his execution, escape recapture. Jamie and Claire decide to stay in America to start a new life; Fergus and Marsali, who is pregnant, decide to stay as well. En route to visit Jamie's aunt, he and Claire are attacked and robbed by Stephen and his gang of bandits. Stephen takes the jewels, as well as Claire's wedding ring, and kills Jamie's associate Lesley.
44	2	"Do No Harm"	Julian Holmes	Karen Campbell	November 11, 2018	0.87
Jamie, Claire, and Young Ian arrive at River Run, the sprawling plantation of Jamie's maternal aunt, Jocasta MacKenzie Cameron. Claire is uncomfortable that Jocasta owns slaves, and when she names Jamie as her heir, he reveals his intent to somehow free them. Jocasta's friend Farquard tries to convince him of the futility of such an attempt. A slave attacks a white overseer; Claire and Jamie save the critically injured slave from immediate execution, but an angry mob demands they hand him over. Forced to comply, Claire euthanises him first.
45	3	"The False Bride"	Ben Bolt	Jennifer Yale	November 18, 2018	0.86
To Jocasta's disappointment, Jamie and Claire decide to leave River Run and make a life of their own elsewhere. Lost in the woods during a storm, Claire finds a human skull and a stone pendant, and sees a ghost of an Indian. She and Jamie follow mysterious footprints that lead them back together. Claire notices modern silver fillings in the skull, which means the deceased had been a time traveller as well. They come to a beautiful stretch of land and decide to claim it. Back in 1970, Brianna and Roger reunite to take a trip to North Carolina. He proposes but she is not ready, a response that sparks an argument between them.
46	4	"Common Ground"	Ben Bolt	Joy Blake	November 25, 2018	0.96
Accepting Governor William Tryon's offer of land, Jamie and Claire settle in what Jamie has named Fraser's Ridge. They are hassled by a group of Cherokee warriors, and a bear. Jamie is attacked by the bear and kills it, learning that it is actually a Cherokee banished for rape. He and the tribe agree to live with each other in peace. In 1971, Roger learns of Jamie and Claire's settlement in North Carolina and calls Brianna to tell her that her parents found each other. He later learns that the Frasers had perished in a fire, but decides not to tell Brianna. Meanwhile, she has travelled to Scotland without telling Roger, to "see her mother".
47	5	"Savages"	Denise Di Novi	Bronwyn Garrity	December 2, 2018	0.96
Claire delivers Petronella Mueller's baby, but Petronella, her baby, and her brother-in-law soon die of the measles. Believing the Cherokee cursed him, a distraught Gerhard Mueller scalps the healer Adawehi, Claire's friend, in revenge. The Indians retaliate, killing Gerhard and his wife and burning their house. Meanwhile, Jamie is reunited with Murtagh, who is now a blacksmith in a nearby town. In 1971, Roger tracks Brianna to Inverness, where she has gone through the standing stones of Craig Na Dunn to warn her parents of their imminent destiny.
48	6	"Blood of My Blood"	Denise Di Novi	Shaina Fewell	December 9, 2018	1.04
Lord John comes to Fraser's Ridge with young William. Murtagh learns that William is Jamie's son, but agrees to keep the secret. Jamie takes the fully grown William hunting and fishing in the forest while Claire nurses John, who has contracted measles. William angers the Cherokee by taking a fish from one of their traps, and Jamie is willing to sacrifice himself to protect his illegitimate son. John recovers, and Jamie is pained to see William leave thereafter.
49	7	"Down the Rabbit Hole"	Jennifer Getzinger	Shannon Goss	December 16, 2018	1.12
Brianna, having arrived in 1769, makes her way across Scotland, twisting her ankle and collapsing in the cold until she is found and taken in by none other than Laoghaire. Roger, following Brianna through the stones, joins the crew of Stephen Bonnet's ship to follow her to America. Brianna remembers the days before Frank's death. Laoghaire realises that Brianna is Claire and Jamie's daughter and decides to have her burned as a witch, but Joan, Laoghaire's youngest daughter, takes Brianna to Lallybroch. During the crossing, Roger tries to help his ancestor, Morag MacKenzie, avoid Stephen's cruelty. After being taken to a harbor town by her uncle Ian, Brianna is approached by an indentured servant Joseph Wemyss, who begs Brianna to take his daughter, Elizabeth, as her servant so she doesn't become his master's concubine. Brianna agrees and books passage to America for them both.
50	8	"Wilmington"	Jennifer Getzinger	Luke Schelhaas	December 23, 2018	0.91
Roger and Brianna are reunited in Wilmington and exchange handfasting vows, but she learns that he knew that her parents would die and did not tell her, and pushes him away, telling him to return to the 1980s. Claire and Jamie are introduced to George Washington, and Jamie is alerted to an ambush set for Murtagh and his fellow insurgents. Claire performs emergency surgery on Edmund Fanning while Jamie secretly sends Fergus to warn Murtagh. Brianna encounters Stephen Bonnet and recognizes the wedding ring he is holding is Claire's; Bonnet rapes her as payment for the ring.
51	9	"The Birds & the Bees"	David Moore	Matthew B. Roberts & Toni Graphia	December 30, 2018	1.01
Brianna finds Jamie in Wilmington, and is reunited with Claire. Roger is forced to rejoin Stephen's crew for the rest of his voyage, but is determined to return to Brianna. Claire guesses that Brianna is pregnant, and Brianna admits that she was raped. Roger comes to Fraser's Ridge, but Lizzie mistakenly identifies Roger to Jamie as Brianna's attacker, and Jamie beats Roger senseless and tells Young Ian to dispose of him. Claire finds the ring, and realises that Stephen is Brianna's rapist.
52	10	"The Deep Heart's Core"	David Moore	Luke Schelhaas	January 6, 2019	1.16
Roger is a prisoner of the Mohawk, and vows to escape them and reunite with Brianna. Meanwhile, Brianna considers an abortion, which Claire warns would be dangerous. Brianna learns what Jamie did and straightens out the misidentification between Roger and Stephen Bonnet. Furioous, she demands Jamie, Claire, and Young Ian recover Roger, while Murtagh brings Brianna and Lizzie to Jocasta's plantation. Roger escapes in the woods, stumbles upon a standing stone ring, and considers whether to return to his own time.
53	11	"If Not for Hope"	Mairzee Almas	Shaina Fewell & Bronwyn Garrity	January 13, 2019	1.27
Roger has stayed in the past, and has been recaptured by the Mohawk. At River Run, Jocasta holds a dinner party of unmarried men as potential suitors for Brianna, concerned for the future of an unwed and pregnant niece. Lord John arrives and learns that Brianna is pregnant, and she later spies him having sex with another male guest, Judge Alderdyce. Knowing that Gerald Forbes plans to propose, Brianna asks John to marry her, believing she will be safe with him. He refuses, but then relents after she tells him about her assault and her current predicament. Murtagh and Fergus capture Stephen at Jamie's request, but Murtagh and Stephen are caught by the authorities. As Jamie tracks Roger, he feels guilty for beating him, and for the harsh things he said to Brianna.
54	12	"Providence"	Mairzee Almas	Karen Campbell	January 20, 2019	1.27
While Fergus plots to break Murtagh out of jail in Wilmington, Brianna insists Lord John bring her to confront Stephen, who has been incarcerated in the same place. She confronts Stephen and offers her forgiveness, though swearing that her baby will never know he existed. A badly-injured Roger arrives at the Mohawk encampment in the upstate area of the Province of New York; he meets Father Alexandre Ferigault, another captive. Ferigault had lived among the Mohawk and fathered a child with one of them, Johiehon, but due to his sin felt unworthy to baptise the baby. Alexandre is tortured but will not perform the ritual, and is finally subjected to the painfully slow and deadly burning of his feet at the stake. Roger escapes, but comes back to throw accelerant on the fire to put Alexandre out of his misery. Johiehon puts down her baby and joins Alexandre in the flames. As a chained Stephen scrambles to reach a dropped set of keys, Fergus and Murtagh send Brianna and John away and then flee the jail, which they destroy with explosives to cover their flight.
55	13	"Man of Worth"	Stephen Woolfenden	Toni Graphia	January 27, 2019	1.45
Brianna gives birth to a boy at River Run. Jamie, Claire, and Young Ian arrive at the Mohawk settlement, but the natives are alarmed by the stone pendant Claire is wearing and send the Frasers away. A group of Mohawk come to Jamie and Claire's camp seeking the stone, which belonged to a former member of their tribe, Otter Tooth, who had prophesied the destruction of the Mohawk. Claire had previously determined from his skull that this man was also a time traveler. The Frasers convince the group to help them free Roger. They are caught in the attempt, but ultimately Young Ian offers himself as a replacement for Roger. On the journey back to North Carolina, Claire tells Roger about Brianna's rape and pregnancy, giving him the chance to decide if he can raise a child that may not be his. Brianna is devastated when Claire and Jamie return to River Run alone, but Roger appears before they depart for Fraser's Ridge and declares his love for Brianna. Jamie receives a letter from Governor Tryon telling him to find and kill the leader of the Regulators: Murtagh.

=== Season 5 (2020) ===
No. overall	No. in season	Title	Directed by	Written by	Original release date	U.S. viewers (millions)
56	1	"The Fiery Cross"	Stephen Woolfenden	Matthew B. Roberts	February 16, 2020 (Note: The episode was first made available on February 14, 2020, exclusively to Starz subscribers only on the Starz app and Starz On Demand.)	0.815
In 1770, Roger and Brianna are formally married, though the festivities are marred by news, from Lord John, that Stephen Bonnet has been seen around Wilmington. Jamie offers room and board to a young man, Josiah Beardsley, who offers to hunt for the Ridge. Aunt Jocasta names Brianna's son, Jeremiah MacKenzie who is called "Jemmy," heir to River Run, mostly to test if Roger married Brianna for money; she and Murtagh, who is still involved with her, comment positively on his response. Governor Tryon orders Col. James Fraser to muster a militia in order to oppose the Regulators, which he does by appealing to Highland traditions, particularly the firing of a Celtic cross. He names Roger MacKenzie his captain and deputy whilst he is abroad. Finally, he releases Murtagh from his oath of loyalty to Ellen MacKenzie and therefore her son Jamie, allowing him to hide.
57	2	"Between Two Fires"	Stephen Woolfenden	Toni Graphia & Luke Schelhaas	February 23, 2020	0.787
Murtagh leads a mob of Regulators in tarring and feathering Wilmington public servants. Jamie, accompanied by British Army officer Lt. Knox, leads the search for the Regulators whilst simultaneously working to free them, leading Murtagh to compliment him on how well he navigates between two fires. Back at Fraser's Ridge, a settler dies of appendicitis, leading Claire to fret over the (lack of) medical education in this time. She writes some advice, particularly on women's reproductive health, using the pen name "Dr. Rawlings" after the person who first owned the equipment Jamie bought her, but decides not to do anything with it, instead choosing to teach Marsali to become her assistant. She also begins to search for a certain type of mold, hoping to create homemade penicillin.
58	3	"Free Will"	Jamie Payne	Luke Schelhaas	March 1, 2020	0.772
Jamie has Fergus write a note to be sent to a printer; Fergus grabs one of "Dr. Rawlings"'s manuscripts, without realizing, to write the note on. Jamie, joined by Claire, then leads the militia to Brownsville. As they travel, the camp is infiltrated by Josiah Beardsley – or, rather, his twin brother Keziah. Jo admits that both he and Kezzie are indentured servants to a man named Aaron Beardsley, and Jamie resolves to buy their contracts while sending Roger ahead with the militia. However, Beardsley's wife, Fanny, is largely unhelpful, mostly to hide the fact that she has bludgeoned Beardsley in the attic and left him lying there for days, taking revenge on a man who raped and beat her. She then gives birth to her child, conceived of a love affair between herself and a (Black) slave. She abandons her daughter with the Frasers, who bring the child with them after finding Jo and Kezzie's contracts and putting Aaron Beardsley out of his misery.
59	4	"The Company We Keep"	Jamie Payne	Barbara Stepansky	March 8, 2020	0.762
Capt. Roger MacKenzie, arriving in Brownsville with the Ridge militia, finds himself caught in a family feud: one of Jamie's men-at-arms, Isaiah Morton, has defiled Alicia Brown, bringing an end to a lucrative arranged marriage, and now Lionel and Richard Brown, joint heads of the family, want his head. Roger struggles to keep the peace, losing the respect of some of Jamie's men in the process, while buying time for Jamie to arrive. One of the Browns adopts the Beardsley infant, but as Claire is conducting business, she learns that her "Dr. Rawlings" notes have been published by accident, and that both Lionel and Richard Brown are irate at their wives cutting them off. Alicia protests that she and Isaiah were in love and that he promised marriage; Isaiah protests that he is already married, though he does not love his wife; in the end, Jamie arranges for the two to elope together.
60	5	"Perpetual Adoration"	Meera Menon	Alyson Evans & Steve Kornacki	March 15, 2020	0.733
At the Ridge, Claire continues her quest to create penicillin, whilst having flashbacks to a (20th-century) Scottish patient who died of penicillin allergy – which, among other things, inspired her return to Scotland in 1968 and discovery of Jamie's survival. Roger finds the gemstone Stephen Bonnet gave for the upkeep of his son Jemmy, and Brianna admits to him that Bonnet may still be alive – and, she fears, nearby (she had a suspicion of being watched in the previous episode). Roger is offended that she implied Jemmy might be Bonnet's, knowing she would never do so without believing in the possibility herself. Finally, Gov. Tryon, in an effort to alleviate the Regulator crisis, offers pardons to all of them except Murtagh Fitzgibbons. Lt. Knox, searching for Murtagh's known associates, gets his hands on the roster for Ardsmuir Prison; Jamie is forced to strangle him to obscure his connection to Murtagh.
61	6	"Better to Marry Than Burn"	Meera Menon	Stephanie Shannon	March 22, 2020	0.823
Aunt Jocasta has chosen to wed Duncan Inness; Jamie and Claire attend in person. They meet Philip Wiley, a fop and a dandy, and leverage his flirtations with Claire into a promise to set them up with a smuggler who can ship out Jamie and Fergus's whiskey: Stephen Bonnet. Back at the Ridge, a swarm of locusts threatens the crop, and Roger and Brianna take charge to drive them off. Finally, Murtagh sneaks into River Run and makes an impassioned plea for Jocasta's love, but Jocasta reveals her own tragic past: married to a Jacobite, she, her husband Hector Cameron, and their daughter Morna fled after Culloden, only to be apprehended by Redcoats and French Jacobite gold found in their possession; Morna was slain in the chaos, proof to Jocasta that she should never marry someone who loves politics more than his family. Murtagh, though not denying her accusations, promises that she will always be second-most-important to him.
62	7	"The Ballad of Roger Mac"	Stephen Woolfenden	Toni Graphia	March 29, 2020	0.812
In May 1771, Jamie turns 50. Governor Tryon has massed his soldiers and militia to exterminate the Regulator movement once and for all. Brianna, staying with a family in nearby Burlington, North Carolina, learns that the royalists and Regulators are camped on either side of the Great Alamance Creek, and rushes into camp with recollections from her studies: the Battle of Alamance, which will inspire the American Revolution, ends with a resounding Regulator defeat. Jamie sends Roger to warn Murtagh, on grounds that Murtagh will be more likely to believe a time traveler. Alas, Murtagh, no stranger to lost causes, resolves to stay, and breathes his last protecting Jamie. Even worse, Roger gets distracted by Morag MacKenzie, the woman he helped on Stephen Bonnet's ship, who is present at the Regulator camp; her husband, William Buccleigh "Buck" MacKenzie, becomes suspicious and subdues him. Jamie, Claire and Brianna find Roger hanged from a tree.
63	8	"Famous Last Words"	Stephen Woolfenden	Danielle Berrow	April 12, 2020	0.784
In a flashback to the 20th century, Professor Roger Wakefield lectures his Oxford University students on the importance of last words; Brianna, dropping in, asks him what his would be. In August 1771, Roger, who managed to survive his hanging, has become voluntarily mute, struggling with repeated post-traumatic flashbacks, rendered as black-and-white silent film which gradually gain sound and color as the episode continues. (Claire and Brianna accurately diagnose the condition.) Young Ian Murray returns to Fraser's Ridge, distinctly less talkative. Governor Tryon has furnished Roger with 5,000 acres of land in an attempt to apologize for the unlawful hanging, and both Roger and Ian are sent out to survey it; Roger, looking down a sheer cliff, has one last flashback to what he saw as he dangled – the face of his beloved wife, Brianna. He then interrupts Ian, who is also seeking solace in death after some unnamed disgrace which severed him from the Mohawk. The two return to Fraser's Ridge, ready to speak.
64	9	"Monsters and Heroes"	Annie Griffin	Shaina Fewell	April 19, 2020	0.837
Whilst leading a hunting party, Jamie is bitten by a snake. Roger, his only companion, lugs him back to the Ridge. Alas, the leg has become infected, and even a last-minute scramble for maggots yields no results. Claire has penicillin, but lost her (20th-century) syringe at the Battle of Alamance, and discusses with Jamie the need to potentially amputate his leg. Jamie at first resists, but Fergus and Young Ian convince him to abandon his pride. It's Brianna, investigating the head of the snake which Roger brought back with him, who jury-rigs a syringe out of the snake's fang, allowing Jamie to recover intact.
65	10	"Mercy Shall Follow Me"	Annie Griffin	Megan Ferrell Burke	April 26, 2020	0.850
In Wilmington, Stephen Bonnet has plotted to inherit River Run, via his son Jeremiah, by arranging for Jocasta and Duncan Inness to experience accidents. First, however, he needs Jemmy. Jamie arranges for a meeting between them, but Bonnet sends an underling: he noticed Claire and Brianna around town, and contrives to kidnap Brianna. He asks her to teach him how to function in polite society, explaining his past as an orphan and confessing his nightmares of drowning with no one to help. However, when Brianna is unable to fake affection for him, he arranges for her to be sold to a white slaver. Fortunately, Jamie, Claire and Roger have arrived to intervene. Brianna has Bonnet taken back to Wilmington and tried for his crimes, and he is sentenced to death by drowning; Brianna, watching from the shore, shoots him – both putting him out of his misery and ensuring he is dead.
66	11	"Journeycake"	Jamie Payne	Diana Gabaldon	May 3, 2020	0.866
Lionel and Richard Brown have formed their own militia, ostensibly to protect the local region from Indians, but it is implied that they themselves are committing the "Indian" attacks. Jemmy is playing with the opal brought back by "Otter Tooth," the 1960s time traveler born as Robert Springer, and experiences it as warm – as do Claire, Roger and Brianna – while Ian and Jamie find it cool to the touch. This confirms to the Frasers that, whatever quality enables time travel, Jemmy has it. The MacKenzies decide to return to the 1970s and spend the episode saying their goodbyes and packing up to leave, while Ian becomes only the third 18th-century citizen (after Murtagh and Jamie himself) to learn that Claire, Roger and Brianna are from the future. At their farewell dinner, Claire treats them to what she calls "18th-century journeycake": peanut butter and jelly sandwiches. Meanwhile, Lionel Brown's wife is injured and he brings her to the Ridge for treatment; there, he finds Claire's medical equipment, labeled with Dr. Rawlings' name. Ian takes the MacKenzies to the standing stones outside Ocracoke, North Carolina and the three go through, only to be flabbergasted by what they see on the other side. Meanwhile, the Browns stage a raid on Jamie's whisky still. While the men of the Ridge are investigating, Lionel Brown kidnaps Claire.
67	12	"Never My Love"	Jamie Payne	Matthew B. Roberts & Toni Graphia	May 10, 2020	0.855
Claire imagines a home in 1980s America at which her whole family – Army officer Ian Murray, hippies Fergus and Marsali, Jocasta and a still-living Murtagh, and Jamie himself – celebrate Thanksgiving, whilst the titular single by The Association plays on the gramophone, allowing her refuge from her 1772 reality of having been kidnapped and gang-raped. Jamie has lit the fiery cross to summon all fighting men of Fraser's Ridge to join him. This, unexpectedly, includes Roger and Brianna MacKenzie: the standing stones, apprehending their wish to return home, sent them right back out again. Claire is warned by one of Lionel Brown's followers, Wendigo Donner, to fit in more with the 1770s: Donner too is from the 1960s, and agrees to help Claire escape in exchange for a gemstone to power his return to his own time. He disappears before Jamie, Roger, Fergus, Ian and their men catch up with Lionel Brown's posse, putting them all to the sword. Only Lionel himself is left alive; Jamie brings him back to the Ridge for questioning, but he meets an untimely end after he threatens Marsali too many times. Jamie returns his corpse to Richard Brown, who promises further trouble. But Claire is safe, and with children and adopted children – Fergus, Marsali, Ian, Brianna, Roger and Jemmy – by her side, begins to recover from her ordeal.

=== Season 6 (2022) ===
No. overall	No. in season	Title	Directed by	Written by	Original release date	U.S. viewers (millions)
68	1	"Echoes"	Kate Cheeseman	Matthew B. Roberts	March 6, 2022	0.641
Jamie's earlier times at Ardsmuir Prison resurface when Tom Christie brings his community to Fraser's Ridge. Claire is making ether to use as anaesthetic in her practice, as well as using it to cope with flashbacks from the incident with Lionel Brown. Jamie is asked by the Governor to act as an Indian liaison with the Cherokee, highlighting the conflict in his mind about supporting the Loyalists or the Rebels in the upcoming revolution.
69	2	"Allegiance"	Kate Cheeseman	Steve Kornacki & Alyson Evans	March 13, 2022	0.559
Jamie and Young Ian visit the Cherokee, who ask for guns to defend their land, including against white people moving west. Tom Christie's daughter Malva shows an interest in learning from Claire, attending an examination of Marsali's pregnancy. Roger is asked to preside at a funeral, when the woman briefly revives, awakening whispers of witchcraft about Claire. Fergus drinks, struggling with feelings of guilt for not protecting his family, but arrives in time for the birth of his son Henri-Christian, a dwarf.
70	3	"Temperance"	Justin Molotnikov	Shaina Fewell	March 20, 2022	0.575
Roger catches boys of the Ridge putting Henri-Christian in the river to see if he is a demon. Fergus tells Claire about his childhood in the Paris brothels and the way that dwarfs were treated. He worries for his newborn son. Brianna is trying to find her place, making matches using phosphorus, and building a spinning wheel for Marsali. Tom Christie, who has an injured right hand, speaks to Claire about having it surgically corrected, creating goodwill from both parties; however, it is only temporary, as Christie's religious conservatism and Claire's 20th-century liberalism butt heads. Fergus, having been kicked out by Marsali on account of his drinking, attempts suicide, only to be stopped by Jamie. Claire is concerned by news that the Boston Tea Party, presage to the Revolutionary War, has happened.
71	4	"Hour of the Wolf"	Christiana Ebohon-Green	Luke Schelhaas	March 27, 2022	0.475
Jamie and Ian take the guns to the Cherokee. Ian is reminded of his time with the Mohawk, and his wife and daughter. The Mohawk who is now married to Ian's wife (Kaheroton) is also visiting the Cherokee and tells of his son. Ian wonders if the Mohawk were correct in exiling him for not belonging. Kaheroton and Ian are reconciled when Ian saves him during a duel.
72	5	"Give Me Liberty"	Christiana Ebohon-Green	Barbara Stepansky	April 3, 2022	0.486
Flora McDonald, who helped Bonnie Prince Charlie to exile, speaks to keep the Scots in America loyal to the English crown. Jamie connects with the Sons of Liberty in Wilmington, where Lord John Grey, Aunt Jocasta and many others have come to hear Flora. Fergus has gone to run a print shop in New Bern, and while packing for the trip, Marsali notices that Brianna is pregnant.
73	6	"The World Turned Upside Down"	Justin Molotnikov	Toni Graphia	April 10, 2022	0.534
Roger is preaching in the new church and notices that the MacNeills are absent. Claire, Brianna, Malva and Lizzie go to check on them and find them near death from the bloody flux (amoebic dysentery). Soon more in the village fall ill and many die. Claire also falls ill with a fever and headache. After she recovers, the Christies arrive and Malva accuses Jamie of seducing her and fathering a child. Jamie denies it, several others are potential fathers. Claire tries to get her to confess and she and Allan accuse her of witchcraft. Claire takes ether and passes out as Malva is crossing the fields, and wakes to find her dead in the garden. She cuts out the baby but it dies.
74	7	"Sticks and Stones"	Jamie Payne	Danielle Berrow	April 24, 2022	0.469
Tom has made Malva confess her sin before the congregation and she names Jamie as the father. The community has turned against Claire. Ian finds the dead sin eater and mentions his missing fingers. Lizzie is pregnant to one of the Beardsleys; Jamie insists she marry one. Claire confesses to Jamie about seeing Lionel and her fears of guilt for what her arrival in the past to be with Jamie has caused. Brown's Committee of Safety arrive to arrest Claire for murder.
75	8	"I Am Not Alone"	Jamie Payne	Luke Schelhaas	May 1, 2022	0.441
Jamie refuses to hand Claire over and there is a shootout. There is a siege, and although the fisher folk come (to support the Committee) and the Scots (to support Jamie) there is an impasse until Tom Christie says he will guarantee Jamie and Claire's safety on the road. Roger, Brianna and Jemmy head off for the presbytery in Edmonton for Roger to become a minister. Jamie and Claire are separated on the journey, Tom follows Claire, and Ian follows Jamie. Claire is put in the cells at Wilmington. Ian and the Mohawk rescue Jamie before he is put aboard a ship for Scotland.

=== Season 7 (2023–2025) ===
No. overall	No. in season	Title	Directed by	Written by	Original release date	U.S. viewers (millions)
Part 1
76	1	"A Life Well Lost"	Lisa Clarke	Danielle Berrow	June 16, 2023	0.387
Jamie and Ian race to Wilmington, but arrive to find that Claire has been taken from jail to tend to a pregnant woman. Before Jamie can put together a plan to rescue her, Tom Christie makes a confession. Meanwhile, Roger begins training to become a minister.
77	2	"The Happiest Place on Earth"	Lisa Clarke	Toni Graphia	June 23, 2023	0.301
After Brianna gives birth to her daughter, Amanda, Claire notices something is wrong. Brianna and Roger must return to their time to keep their family whole, and Jamie suggests Claire should go with them. Some unwelcome visitors at Fraser's Ridge find buried secrets.
78	3	"Death Be Not Proud"	Jacquie Gould	Tyler English-Beckwith	June 30, 2023	0.237
With their home destroyed, Jamie, Claire, and Ian decide to return to Scotland for a while. Jamie tells Claire he sees things from her time in his dreams. In 1978, Brianna and Roger open a chest that has been in storage for 200 years.
79	4	"A Most Uncomfortable Woman"	Jacquie Gould	Marque Franklin-Williams	July 7, 2023	0.441
Jamie is conscripted into the Continental Army, and sent to Fort Ticonderoga. Claire and Ian decide that they will also stay and fight. William Ransom, Jamie's illegitimate son and a British soldier, is sent on a mission through the Great Dismal Swamp. In 1980, Brianna applies for an engineering job at a dam, and Jeremiah talks of supernatural creatures called "Nuckelavee" in their home.
80	5	"Singapore"	Tracey Deer	Taylor Mallory	July 14, 2023	0.325
At Lallybroch, Jemmy and Mandy search for their grandfather's grave, and Brianna and Roger read letters from 1777. Under Maj. Gen. Arthur St. Clair, Jamie commands Fraser's Irregulars building defences for Fort Ticonderoga. Claire helps the sick and injured, clashing with Lt Stactoe. From the south, Ian gathers information from native tribes, while the British approach from the north. Jamie learns his cousin Brig. Gen. Simon Fraser of Balnain is in command of the advancing British, and is concerned Simon will place artillery on a nearby hill. Claire tells him about WWII Gen. Arthur Percival at Singapore, who focused guns towards the sea, but was instead attacked from behind by land. Jamie argues with Brig. Gen. Fermoy about taking the hill. William Ransom helps Dr Denzell Hunter and his sister Rachel escape a deadly trap at the Johnson's. At the dam, Rob Cameron locks Brianna inside, where she finds an odd phenomenon in the tunnels. Ian is sent to find the Mohawk Joseph Brant (AKA Thayendanegea) at Shadow Lake, where he talks to Wahionhaweh and Swiftest of Lizards. Jemmy gets in trouble with Miss Glendenning for speaking Gaelic in school. Ian meets Rachel at the fort. Mandy sees the Nuckelavee.
81	6	"Where the Waters Meet"	Tracey Deer	Sarah H. Haught	July 21, 2023	0.332
William Ransom arrives at Fort Ticonderoga where British Gen. Simon Fraser now commands after Jamie's canoe evacuation. Ian leads the civilians through the woods. Mrs Raven's irrational fears get Claire captured and returned to the fort, where she tends to Walter Woodcock's post-amputation complications. William reports to Capt. Richardson who mentors him on spy-craft and second chances. William then runs into Claire who is demanding better treatment for prisoners. Roger meets with Jemmy's headmaster and gets a job teaching Gaelic. Brianna and Roger link her dam tunnels experience with the ley line from the Achavanich standing stones, and he adds it to his Hitchhiker's Guide to Time Travel. Rob accidentally reads the guide and invites himself to dinner. Ian and Jamie plan to rescue Claire. Ian runs into William, who grants a life for a life. They reunite with the Continental Army. Ian visits Rachel. Jamie meets Col. Daniel Morgan and joins his rifle regiment. Claire recalls the Battles of Saratoga which draws France into the war, and tells Jamie about his son William. Roger catches the Nuckelavee.
82	7	"A Practical Guide for Time-Travelers"	Joss Agnew	Margot Ye	July 28, 2023	0.380
Encamped at Stillwater, NY, Capt. Richardson assigns William to courier duty, but he asks Gen. Simon Fraser to fight in the First Battle of Saratoga instead. The Nuckelavee, Buck MacKenzie, tells Roger and Brianna how he arrived in the 20th century, after Buck tried to hang Roger at Alamance (in "The Ballad of Roger Mac"). They question his intentions, and tell Buck about family relations. Rob makes a surprise visit. Buck contemplates returning to his own time, after learning the year of his death. After reading Roger's Guide, Rob kidnaps Jemmy to travel through the stones. Ian and his scouts capture a British turncoat with intel on Gen. John Burgoyne's skirmishing movements. Jamie faces the British in battle under Col. Morgan.
83	8	"Turning Points"	Joss Agnew	Luke Schelhaas	August 11, 2023	0.334
Finding Jamie on the battlefield, Claire fends off a pair of looters, and then comforts Dr Hunter after dealing with casualties. She sends Ian to deliver medical ingredients to Rachel and they reveal their feelings. She trades yet more ingredients with Maj. Gen. Benedict Arnold. Jamie fights in the Second Battle of Saratoga and is ordered to shoot his cousin, Gen. Simon Fraser, nearly killing William. Another of Morgan's Rifles hits Gen. Fraser, and Jamie visits him on his deathbed in the British camp. Gen. Gates sends Jamie home to Scotland with Simon's body. Ian says goodbye to Rachel before leaving for Scotland. Roger and Buck go through the stones to find Jemmy. On the trail to Valley Forge, Rachel passes Arch Bug, Ian's adversary (after events in "Death Be Not Proud").
Part 2
84	9	"Unfinished Business"	Stewart Svaasand	Barbara Stepansky	November 22, 2024	0.279
Jamie buries Simon and returns to Lallybroch. Ian reunites with family, but his father has consumption and his mother, Jenny, is struggling with his imminent death. Ian tells them about Rachel. Jamie has unfinished business; he cedes Balriggan to Laoghaire on condition that she marry and releases Joan MacKimmie to take her vows as a nun. Claire tells Ian's brother Michael not to be in France past 1788 due to "The Terror" of the French Revolution which is imminent, and she reveals she is a time traveller. Roger and Buck return through the stones to 1739, not 1778. They split up to find Jemmy. Roger arrives at Lallybroch, greeted by Jamie's father, Laird Brian Fraser. Claire receives a letter from Lord John in Philadelphia, pleading for her return to perform life-saving surgery on his nephew, Henry. Ian's parents urge him to return with her so he can be with Rachel. Buck takes ill. Roger takes him to a healer, and runs into Geillis Duncan.
85	10	"Brotherly Love"	Stewart Svaasand	Luke Schelhaas	November 29, 2024	0.222
Jamie buries Ian Murray Sr at Lallybroch. Claire operates on Lord Henry Grey at Mercy Woodcock's home in Philadelphia. Arch Bug stalks and captures Rachel, threatening to kill her as revenge against Ian. Bug and Ian struggle and William intervenes, shooting Bug. Captain Amias Ratliff of the HMS Roberts reports to Claire that Jamie's ship the Euterpe was lost at sea with all hands. Captain Richardson comes to arrest Claire for espionage. Lord John Grey proposes marriage to save her from hanging. Back in 1739 Scotland, Geillis tends to Buck. Dougal MacKenzie soon arrives with RAF tags belonging to Roger's father, who went MIA in WWII.
86	11	"A Hundredweight of Stones"	Lisa Clarke	Sarah H. Haught	December 6, 2024	N/A
Lord John Grey weds Claire to save her from the gallows. As she contemplates suicide, John comforts her and they sleep together. They reconcile their marriage as a joined tribute to Jamie's memory. Later, John hosts a soirée and introduces her as Lady John Grey. Captain Richardson approaches Claire to spy on John for the Rebels, but she refuses. Ian and Rachel discuss their love, their future, and Ian's past with Emily, before he leaves for Valley Forge. Roger searches for his father, gaining a jewelled necklace as a clue. Brianna is confronted by Rob, who reveals he did not travel to the past and is still searching for the hidden gold. He threatens her at knifepoint, but she knocks him unconscious with a cooking pan. John opposes his nephew Henry's wish to marry Mercy, putting John at odds with Claire. Jamie suddenly arrives at John's house and reveals he was not on board the sunken ship. William learns accidentally that he is Jamie's biological son. British soldiers enter to arrest Jamie, and he escapes by taking John hostage.
87	12	"Carnal Knowledge"	Lisa Clarke	Toni Graphia	December 13, 2024	0.246
John confesses his carnal knowledge of Claire to Jamie while they thought him dead. Their fight is interrupted by Corp. Jethro Woodbine of Dunning's Rangers, who takes John prisoner because of his relation to Maj. Gen. Charles Grey who committed the Paoli Massacre. They plan to hang him. Jamie takes French correspondence to Morgan, who introduces him to Gen. George Washington. Washington promotes Jamie to Brigadier General in command of a battalion. William asks Claire about the circumstances of his conception, and he leaves angrily. He then meets Ian and Rachel on the road where he learns of their betrothal. Another fight ensues, and William has Ian arrested. After Jamie forces William to release Ian, he goes to confront Claire. Dr Hunter tends to John's eye. John tries to escape.
88	13	"Hello, Goodbye"	Jan Matthys	Madeline Brestal & Evan McGahey	December 20, 2024	N/A
With Rob contained, Brianna and Mandy leave Lallybroch to actively search for Jemmy. Likewise remembering his mother's tale, Jemmy actively tries to rescue himself. Ian and Rachel wed as their friends observe in silence. In 1739, Roger and Buck recognise an area that will become Loch Errochty Dam, and Jeremiah is hunted by locals. A Continental officer, Rev. Peleg Woodsworth, finds John. Jamie and Claire make up, and he dons his general's uniform. Rob escapes, so the police don't believe Brianna; she takes matters into her own hands.
89	14	"Ye Dinna Get Used to It"	Jan Matthys	Diana Gabaldon	December 27, 2024	N/A
Lafayette bumps into Claire, literally; she and Jamie hosts Gen. Washington's party at John's house. Ian spies out Gen. Henry Clinton's New Jersey camp, and shows Rachel how to apply his war paint. Jamie takes command of 300 men. John turns coat to survive and ends up in Jamie's camp. Claire fixes his eye. Brianna confronts Rob and two others at Lallybroch. Jane Pocock and little sister Fanny flee Philadelphia; she returns William's gorget and asks for protection. William is sent to Oberst Von Schnell at Spotswood. John learns it is a trap by Capt. Richardson; he and Ian go to rescue him.
90	15	"Written in My Own Heart's Blood"	Joss Agnew	Danielle Berrow	January 3, 2025	N/A
Prior to the Battle of Monmouth, Jamie recalls his mother's death. Claire, Rachel and Dr Hunter care for the wounded at Tennent Church, and Claire proves her skill to Capt. Jared Leckie. Roger tells Buck of his parents, and Buck suggests going back to 1980. John and Ian enter the Hessian camp to save William. Fanny informs William that Jane was arrested by Maj. Jenkins. Brianna finds Roger's letter from 1739 and decides to take the children to find him. As the British retreat near the church, Jamie's men exchange fire with the troops and Claire is shot. Leckie refuses to operate, so Dr Hunter is recalled as she lies dying. Jamie refuses a direct order to rejoin the fighting and writes his resignation in blood on the messenger's body.
91	16	"A Hundred Thousand Angels"	Joss Agnew	Matthew B. Roberts & Toni Graphia	January 17, 2025	0.356
Jane is interviewed for a broadsheet, but refuses to provide the inquisitor with details, so he threatens her sister Fanny. William asks John to help Jane escape punishment. When John refuses, he asks for Jamie's assistance instead. During a rescue attempt, they discover that Jane has committed suicide. While convalescing, Claire dreams of Master Raymond. John visits Claire, and makes a truce with Jamie. In 1739, Roger is reunited with Brianna and the children, and she meets Laird Brian Fraser, her grandfather, who built Lallybroch for his late wife Ellen. Ian asks about returning to North Carolina, and Rachel reveals she is pregnant. Jamie invites Fanny to live with them on Fraser's Ridge, and Claire comforts her. Fanny reveals that her mother's name was Faith, the same name as Claire's stillborn child. Fanny sings a song Faith taught her, which Claire recognises as the song she sang to her child, and Claire suspects her child may have actually lived.

=== Season 8 (2026) ===
No. overall	No. in season	Title	Directed by	Written by	Original release date	U.S. viewers (millions)
92	1	"Soul of a Rebel"	Jan Matthys	Sarah H. Haught	March 6, 2026	N/A
Claire kills Sebastian Vasquez, who brags about killing Captain Pocock and his wife Faith and selling their daughters Jane and Frances into prostitution. In Savannah, Georgia 1779, at Fergus Fraser & Sons, Jamie warns about printing seditious pamphlets, and travels with Claire and Fanny back to Fraser's Ridge, where Ian has rebuilt their house. William hears that his cousin Benjamin has died. Lord John Grey vows justice against the turncoat Richardson, encouraging William (whether he calls himself Ransom, Fraser or Grey) to neither wallow in alcohol, nor renounce his earldom. Trader Hiram Crombie introduces his partner Captain Charles Cunningham, who claims he no longer fights for the British, but Jamie is suspicious. Roger, Brianna and their children reunite with Jamie and Claire. William assures Ben's widow, Amaranthus Cowden Grey, of her son Trevor's future. Jamie determines to move the gold so that Rob cannot find it. Jamie and Brianna find branded and hanged loyalists. After slapping Mandy for calling her a witch, Cunningham's mother Elspeth declares they "are all undoubtedly going to hell". From Frank Randall's book, The Soul of a Rebel: The Scottish Roots of the American Revolution, Jamie's reads of his impending death at the Battle of Kings Mountain.
93	2	"Prophecies"	Caitríona Balfe	Barbara Stepansky	March 13, 2026	N/A
Jamie invites Cunningham to Freemasonry meetings. Henry Grey marries Mercy Woodcock, despite the ban on interracial marriages. William determines to find out how Ben died while held prisoner by the Continental Army. While berry picking, a bear mauls Amy McCallum-Lindsay, but Claire is unable to help as Amy's husband Evan and Aidan McCallum watch her die. Elspeth bonds with Claire while preparing Amy's corpse for viewing and burial. Jamie leads a bear hunt, but Cunningham had already killed it. Claire helps Rachel through labour to bear a son, Oggy. Benjamin Cleveland tries in vain to enlist Jamie into the Overmountain militia to protect against Tories, and admits to hanging loyalists. Cleveland is also after the ex-Tory Cunningham, who speaks at the Lodge about his wife's death during childbirth. Cunningham prophecies that he has "seven years from Saratoga" to live after his son Simon died in the battle. Jamie doubts Cunningham's "God-given" purpose, but "hears" Frank saying, Cunningham has five more years to live. Meanwhile, William travels to the Continental Army camp, discovering the tin soldier he had given Ben in 1775 is missing. He exhumes Ben's body, but finds someone else buried in Ben's grave.
94	3	"Abies Fraseri"	Metin Hüseyin	Madeline Brestal	March 20, 2026	N/A
Jamie argues with Claire after John invites Brianna to paint Amaranthus's and Trevor's portrait. Binta and Agnes ask Claire to deliver Susannah Whitaker's twins, despite her husband Aaron's reluctance. Recalling Master Raymond's words when Faith was stillborn, Susannah's stillborn girl begins breathing. To Jamie, Claire describes "a pale blue light" flowing from her fingertips into the baby. A strand of her hair changes to "the color of moonlight" just as the Indian woman had predicted. Meanwhile, Major General Alexander Leslie tells William about John's governance of Ardsmuir prison twenty-five years earlier. Percival Beauchamp pressures John to meet printer Claudel Fraser, in return for locating Captain Richardson. After showing Ben's tin soldier to William, Amaranthus kisses him. Cleveland claims smuggled guns after killing two officers, one of whom lewdly propositioned Fanny. Jamie retrieves a letter about back country Abies fraseri, and from Cunningham's cipher, unmasks him as a British spy sent by General Charles Cornwallis and Major Patrick Ferguson to exploit "the loyal Southerner" by recruiting a militia on Fraser's land. Cunningham tries enlisting Fraser, promising he can keep his ridge after the King's victory, bringing him, in Frank’s words, "closer to Kings Mountain and closer to your history".
95	4	"Muskets, Liberty, and Sauerkraut"	Metin Hüseyin	Evan McGahey	March 27, 2026	N/A
Jamie provides gold for guns, instructing Roger and Brianna to keep safe during the Siege of Savannah with Marsali MacKimmie and Fergus Fraser, who toasts, "To muskets, liberty and sauerkraut". While recruiting men with Josiah and Ian, William Buccleigh MacKenzie assures Jamie that Rob Cameron "won't be bothering them again". After Claire relocates Elspeth's shoulder, Fanny comments on brothel-living. Brianna and William talk about their father, Jamie. Wanting to establish a French colony in the Old Northwest, Percival reveals Fergus's parentage, born Claudel from Amélie LeVigne Beauchamp and the Comte St Germain, whose Paris estate is held in trust for him. Amaranthus proposes William abdicate his earldom to their firstborn. Cunningham makes a pass at Claire. At Crombie's Emporium, Rachel reads about the Patriot Army's Susquehanna River massacre, retaliating for Joseph Brant's raids. She accompanies Ian northward to rescue his former wife Wahionhaweh (aka Emily) and son, Swiftest of Lizards. Jamie tasks Ian to learn more about Jane's family from the brothel girls in Philadelphia. Lieutenant Colonel Francis Marion angrily rejects Roger's request for guns because Jamie "abandoned his troops at Monmouth to tend his wife". Prevented from leaving, Roger decides to fight alongside Marion's Patriots.
96	5	"Send for the Devil"	Niall MacCormick	Luke Schelhaas	April 3, 2026	N/A
Aaron warns that Cunningham is coming to take Fraser's Ridge and hang Jamie. Brianna encourages William to get to know Jamie as she did. Threatened by Partland's militia from the settlement of Ninety Six, Jamie resigns to "deal with the devil". After praying while Dr Denzell Hunter treats drummerboy Christophe's neck wound, Roger survives artillery fire. Jamie sends for his Ardsmuir men to defend against Cunningham's loyalists. Claire and Elspeth pray together, waiting to see who survives. Since Cunningham speaks politics at Lodge, urging loyalty to King and Country, Jamie rebuts from the Declaration of Arbroath, "never will we...be brought under English rule....we are fighting...for freedom". After noting loyalists, Jamie escapes during the closing prayer. Elspeth tells Claire, Jamie's hanging would be a just execution for a traitor. Jamie knocks out Crombie, and tells Cunningham to leave "my land. On foot or in a box". Believing himself impervious, Cunningham attacks Jamie. To save Jamie, Buck shoots Cunningham, paralysing his legs; Claire treats him. Amaranthus initiates premarital sex with William, who later finds Ben alive as a Continental Army officer. Josiah returns with Cleveland's militiamen. Claire remarks, "Send for the devil, the devil appears".
97	6	"Blessed Are the Merciful"	Metin Hüseyin	Danielle Berrow	April 10, 2026	N/A
For defeating Ninety-Six's militiamen, Jamie realises he owes Cleveland. Roger tells Brianna he wants to be ordained. Benjamin, now General Ralph Bleeker, tells William about Thomas Paine's Common Sense, and that it was Amaranthus's idea to fake his death. Realising how William "comforted" Amaranthus, Ben confines William in the guardhouse after fighting. Ahroniaronwateh warns Ian away from Shadow Lake, referring him to Thayendanegea, whose wife Ahdohwahgeseon confirms Wahionhaweh still lives, but Thayendanegea prohibits Ian from seeing her. After Jamie evicts his betrayers, Mrs Crombie begs mercy for their wives and children, despite their husbands' forbiddance. Doctor Hunter plans William's escape from Private Chesley. For his battle actions, Marion grants Roger the guns he requested. Despite her jealousy, Rachel petitions for Ian to see Wahionhaweh and her son, whom Thayendanegea did not know was his. Insisting their husbands relinquish weapons and swear fealty, Jamie revokes his banishment letter, and writes new tenancy contracts for their wives, quoting scripture, "Blessed are the merciful, for they shall obtain mercy." Recounting her dream that soldiers captured their son, forcing him to die in battle, Wahionhaweh grants Ian custody of Ian James, and renames Oggy, Hunter. Claire declares friendship as Elspeth takes Charles to England.
98	7	"Evidence of Things Not Seen"	Tracey Deer	Toni Graphia	April 17, 2026	N/A
Jamie climbs Kings Mountain to survey it. William confronts Amaranthus, and informs John that Ben turned coat. A rough looking man throws produce at Marsali. Fanny is distraught for losing her grandmère's lace square. Percy informs John that Richardson is sailing for Savannah. William catches them kissing, and confronts John about "knowing" Jamie at Ardsmuir, but John has had enough of William's ingratitude and disrespect. Ian discovers a pamphlet, Jane Eleanora Pocock: The Life of a Whore and Murderess, confirming Jane's mother was Faith, who sailed to North Carolina to find her mother. Alerted of fire by Joanie, Marsali evacuates. Roger catches Henri-Christian. Fergus lowers Germain before falling through the burning roof. Brianna reveals she is pregnant. Marsali tells her about threatening poems, one about fire. Jamie and Claire reveal to Fanny that Faith was their daughter, upsetting Fanny, who has lost everyone. They reassure her, "that faith is the evidence of things not seen", and asks her to have faith in them. It is revealed that in 1744 Paris, Master Raymond had given baby Faith to Mrs Jeanne Louvière, teaching her to sing "I Do Like to Be Beside the Seaside" that he learned from Claire.
99	8	"In the Forest"	Tracey Deer	Ronald D. Moore	April 24, 2026	N/A
After burying Fergus on Fraser's Ridge, Marsali decides to sign papers to receive St Germain's estate to rebuild the print shop and support the Rebels, her family, and her unborn child. From Frank's nickname for Brianna, Jamie thinks his book, dedicated to "Deadeye", might be meant more as a warning to her than him. He studies it, preparing for the coming battle. Buck tells Roger how he went to 1980 and killed Rob, who bought a gemstone to travel through the stones. Brianna builds a Hall rifle to counter the Ferguson rifles they will face. William confides with Brianna regarding Amaranthus. He goes fishing and calls John a sodomite, asking if Jamie was his lover, resentful towards both for withholding the truth. Claire admonishes him that Jamie may soon die in battle. Jamie trains men to skirmish; Aaron and his men join Jamie's militia. William proposes they go hunting together, "in the forest", and Jamie explains why he left William as a boy at Helwater; embracing, they reconcile. After praying at Jane's memorial cairn, Fanny finds a raw gemstone that cracks as she hears the stones buzzing like bees. At Tannahill's solicitor office, Richardson knocks John unconscious while Percy watches.
100	9	"Pharos"	Emer Conroy	Diana Gabaldon	May 8, 2026	N/A
John wakes, chained, and confronted by carnal acts with Neil Patrick Stapleton. Percy (aka Perseverance Wainwright) contributes his own testimony, including incest. John "does not submit to blackmail". Richardson wants John's brother Hal to convince the House of Lords to continue funding the war. John scratches "pharos" (Greek for lighthouse) inside his ring, trusting Percy to deliver it to William. Seven weeks later, Amaranthus enlists Claire, Jamie, and William, who beat Percy to reveal John's captor. Given the ring, William surmises, "Tybee". Jamie and William infiltrate Richardson's boathouse, killing two guards, freeing John. At gunpoint, Claire captures Richardson, who reasons, victorious British abolitionists could free 800,000+ slaves across the realm. Otherwise, American slavery continues "85 more years" starting "another bloody war". Claire deduces, "The Civil War...You're a time traveller". After changing Culloden and Alamance history failed, Claire concludes Richardson cannot succeed, releasing him, but John kills him. John and Jamie finally reconcile. Learning Jamie's fate at Kings Mountain, Brianna urges him to stay, but to protect Brianna, he needs to fight. John forces Percy to sign an affidavit confessing his crimes, or die. Faced with prison, Percy shoots himself. Cleveland arrives to gather men against Ferguson, "You owe me Fraser".
101	10	"And the World Was All Around Us"	Emer Conroy	Matthew B. Roberts	May 15, 2026	N/A
Jamie writes his last will and testament, and spends time with Claire and Brianna before leaving with Roger, Ian and others. Claire imparts advice to a tearful Fanny before joining Jamie. Roger and Claire hang back to treat wounded, as their militia meets Col. Campbell, but hearing the battle, Claire approaches their lines. Meanwhile, Brianna, Rachel and Lizzie quietly shuck corn while Fanny relays Claire's advice. Patriots advance uphill towards Ferguson's lines. Against Roger's warning, Claire, frantic to find Jamie alive, joins them, shooting a Redcoat and avoiding musket fire, before Ferguson's troops surrender. Claire spots Jamie, shouting "No!" as Ferguson attacks from horseback. Jamie breaks his sword, declaring, "It's over, Sassenach." Jamie asks Ferguson to surrender, but he shouts "never" and shoots Jamie. Buck, Ian and others kill Ferguson. Jamie dies in Claire's arms. After a night of mourning, Claire concedes, "He's home", exhaling. Series epilogue: Outside in the rain, Jamie watches Claire inside combing her hair. Frank Randall asks, "can I help you", but Jamie departs. The rain ends, night turns to day, and he touches the centre standing stone. Blue flowers appear as he walks away. A flashback montage ends back on Kings Mountain with Jamie and Claire, her hair now completely white. They both open their eyes, inhaling.

== Ratings ==
Outlander : U.S. viewers per episode (millions)

Season	Episode number																Average
Season	1	2	3	4	5	6	7	8	9	10	11	12	13	14	15	16	Average
1	0.72	0.90	1.00	0.84	0.95	1.10	1.23	1.42	1.22	0.86	1.09	1.11	1.05	1.08	1.01	0.98	1.04
2	1.46	1.24	1.21	1.17	1.13	1.03	1.10	1.06	0.94	0.82	0.86	1.05	1.15	–			1.09
3	1.49	1.40	1.55	1.59	1.60	1.72	1.52	1.64	1.49	1.23	1.40	1.51	1.43	–			1.51
4	1.08	0.87	0.86	0.96	0.96	1.04	1.12	0.91	1.01	1.16	1.27	1.27	1.45	–			1.07
5	0.82	0.79	0.77	0.76	0.73	0.82	0.81	0.78	0.84	0.85	0.87	0.86	–				0.81
6	0.64	0.56	0.58	0.48	0.49	0.53	0.47	0.44	–								0.52
7	0.38	0.30	0.24	0.44	0.33	0.33	0.38	0.33	0.28	0.22	TBD	0.25	TBD	TBD	TBD	0.36	TBD

Audience measurement performed by Nielsen Media Research
