= Carrie Vaughn =

American author (born 1973)

- Vaughn at Worldcon in Helsinki in 2017
- Born: January 28, 1973 (age 53); Mather Air Force Base, Sacramento, California, U.S.
- Education: Occidental College (BA); University of Colorado Boulder (MA)
- Occupation: Novelist
- Writing career
- Period: 1999–present
- Genres: Fantasy, romance, science fiction, paranormal romance
- Notable works: Colorado Book Award (2017); Philip K. Dick Award (2018)
- Website: carrievaughn.com

Carrie Vaughn (born January 28, 1973) is an American writer, the author of the urban fantasy Kitty Norville series. She has published more than 60 short stories in science fiction and fantasy magazines as well as short story anthologies and internet magazines. She is one of the authors for the Wild Cards books. Vaughn won the 2018 Philip K. Dick Award for her novel Bannerless. Her short story collection, Amaryllis and Other Stories, won the 2017 Colorado Book Award.

== Early life and education ==
Vaughn at Worldcon 2026

Vaughn was born in Sacramento, California to a military family. Her family moved all over the United States before ending up in Colorado, where Vaughn graduated high school. She earned a Bachelor of Arts degree from Occidental College in Los Angeles, during which she did a study abroad year at the University of York.

She later graduated from the University of Colorado Boulder with a Master of Arts degree in English Literature.

== Career ==
Vaughn's stories have received a number of mention credits in The Year's Best Science Fiction, edited by Gardner Dozois and The Year's Best Fantasy and Horror, edited by Ellen Datlow, Terry Windling, Kelly Link, and Gavin Grant.

Her short story "Amaryllis", originally published in Lightspeed Magazine, was named a year's best in Gardner Dozois's Twenty-Eighth Annual Collection of the Year's Best Science Fiction and was nominated for a Hugo Award. Her short story "That Game We Played During the War" was a finalist for the 2017 Hugo Award.

Vaughn is a 1998 graduate of the intensive 6-week Odyssey Writing Workshop, one of the top speculative fiction writing workshops in the USA. In 2009, she returned to the workshop as the special writer-in-residence. In 2020, she was a visiting guest lecturer.

While the Kitty Norville books are published as fantasy, they have been popular with romance readers as well. In 2005, Kitty and the Midnight Hour won Romantic Times Reviewers' Choice Award for "Best First Mystery". Vaughn has said she welcomes the attention, but that it was unexpected:

I emerged from the world of science fiction and fantasy, but I'm being promoted as a romance writer. It's kind of like Jerry Lewis becoming popular in France, I guess.

Vaughn's 2016 collection, Amaryllis and Other Stories, won the 2017 Colorado Book Award.

Her novel Bannerless won the 2018 Philip K. Dick Award. The sequel, The Wild Dead, another murder mystery following Bannerless main character Enid, was published in 2018.

Vaughn's short story "Woolly" was a finalist for the 2026 Theodore Sturgeon Award.

== Personal life ==
Vaughn lives in Boulder, Colorado. She enjoys hiking in the nearby Rocky Mountain National Park.

== Bibliography ==
=== Novels ===
==== Kitty Norville ====
1. Kitty and the Midnight Hour (2005)
2. Kitty Goes to Washington (2006)
3. Kitty Takes a Holiday (2007)
4. Kitty and the Silver Bullet (2008)
5. Kitty and the Dead Man's Hand (February 2009)
6. Kitty Raises Hell (March/April 2009)
7. Kitty's House of Horrors (January 2010)
8. Kitty Goes to War (June 2010)
9. Kitty's Big Trouble (July 2011)
10. Kitty Steals the Show (July 2012)
11. Kitty Rocks the House (March 2013)
12. Kitty in the Underworld (July 2013)
13. Low Midnight (December 2014)
14. Kitty Saves the World (April 2015)

The book Kitty's Greatest Hits (Aug 2011) contains short stories written over a long period and, in Vaughn's words, "its continuity is all over the map, from 500 years before the novels take place on up to the recent ones." Vaughn does not include it in the numbering of novels, and considers Kitty Steals the Show to be the 10th novel in the series.

==== Golden Age ====
- After the Golden Age (April 2011)
- Dreams of the Golden Age (January 2014)

==== The Bannerless Saga ====
- Bannerless (July 2017)
- The Wild Dead (July 2018)

==== The Naturalist Society ====
- The Naturalist Society (November 2024)
- The Glass Slide World (October 2025)

==== Other novels ====
- Voices of Dragons (March 2010)
- Discord's Apple (July 2010)
- Steel (March 2011)
- Martians Abroad (January 2017)
- Questland (June 2021)

==== Novellas ====
- The Ghosts of Sherwood (June 2020)
- The Heirs of Locksley (August 2020)

==== Omnibus editions ====
1. Long-Time Listener, First-Time Werewolf (2007) is a Science Fiction Book Club edition collecting Kitty and the Midnight Hour, Kitty Goes to Washington, Kitty Takes a Holiday, and "Kitty Meets the Band."

==== Wild Cards ====
- "Ghost Girl Takes Manhattan" Wild Cards, Vol. 1 reissue, 2010, Tor Books
- "Always Spring in Prague" Wild Cards, Vol. 4 reissue, 2014, Tor Books
- "Just Cause" Busted Flush, 2008 Tor Books
- "Chosen Ones," Inside Straight, 2008 Tor Books
- "Nuestra Señora de la Esperanza" 2014 Tor.com Original
- "The Thing About Growing Up in Jokertown" 2016 Tor.com Original
- "Long is the Way," 2019 Tor.com Original, with Sage Walker

=== Short fiction ===
Vaughn lists and links to a number of her short stories on her website.

=== Collections ===
Amaryllis and Other Stories (August 2016)

==== Kitty Norville ====
1. "Doctor Kitty Solves All Your Problems" Weird Tales 324, Summer 2001
2. "Kitty Loses Her Faith" Weird Tales 333, Fall 2003
3. "Kitty and the Mosh Pit of the Damned" Weird Tales 338
4. "Winnowing the Herd" Strange Horizons, October 16, 2006. A tale of Kitty and her radio station.
5. "Looking After Family" Realms of Fantasy, February 2007. A tale of Cormac the assassin.
6. "Kitty's Zombie New Year" Weird Tales 345
7. "Life is the Teacher" Hotter Than Hell, June 2008 (ed. by Kim Harrison)
8. "Il Est Ne" Wolfsbane and Mistletoe, October 2008 (ed. by Charlaine Harris)
9. "The Temptation of Robin Green" The Mammoth Book of Paranormal Romance, April 2009 (ed. Trisha Telep)
10. "Conquistador de la Noche" Subterranean Online, Spring 2009 (ed. Gardner Dozois). The origin story of Rick the vampire.
11. "Kitty Learns the Ropes" Full Moon City, ed. Darrell Schweitzer, March 2010
12. "Wild Ride" Running with the Pack, ed. Ekaterina Sedia
13. "God's Creatures" Dark and Stormy Knights, ed. P.N. Elrod, July 2010
14. "Defining Shadows," Those Who Fight Monsters, ed. by Justin Gustainis, Edge Science Fiction and Fantasy, March 2011
15. "It's Still the Same Old Story," Down These Strange Streets, ed. George R. R. Martin and Gardner Dozois, November 2011
16. "The Arcane Art of Misdirection," Hex Appeal, ed. P.N. Elrod, June 2012
17. "Unternehmen Werewolf," Halloween: Magic, Mystery, and the Macabre, ed. by Paula Guran, September 2013.
18. "Bellum Romanum," Urban Enemies anthology, ed. by Joseph Nassise, Simon & Schuster, August 2017.

==== Other stories ====
1. "PCS" Military Lifestyle Magazine, July 1994
2. "The Girl with the Pre-Raphaelite Hair" Talebones 17, Fall 1999
3. "The Haunting of Princess Elizabeth" Sword and Sorceress XVII, May 2000
4. "A Riddle in Nine Syllables" Talebones 20, Fall 2000
5. "In Time" Talebones 21, Spring 2001
6. "Silence Before Starlight" Talebones 23, Winter 2001
7. "The Librarian's Daughter" Realms of Fantasy, August 2002
8. "The Heroic Death of Lieutenant Michkov" Polyphony 1, Fall 2002
9. "Strife Lingers in Memory" Realms of Fantasy, December 2002
10. "A Hunter's Ode to His Bait" Realms of Fantasy, February 2003
11. "After the Golden Age" Dogtown Review 1, May 2004
12. "This is the Highest Step in the World" All-Star Zeppelin Adventure Stories, October 2004
13. "Peace in Our Time" Futurismic.com, December 2004
14. "The Bravest of Us Touched the Sky" Talebones 29, Winter 2004
15. "Dances from the Unseelie Court," The Eggplant Online Library, May 2005
16. "Danae at Sea" TEL: Stories, Fall 2005
17. "Draw Thy Breath in Pain" Paradox #8, December 2005
18. "The Whimsical Lives of Bean Counters" Talebones 31, Winter 2005
19. "Real City" Futurismic.com, June 2006
20. "Last Moments of a Doomed Race" Son and Foe #4, 2006
21. "For Fear of Dragons" Weird Tales, Oct/Nov 2006
22. "Of Swords and Horses" Realms of Fantasy, December 2006
23. "Crows" Talebones 34, Winter 2006
24. "A Princess of Spain" The Secret History of Vampires, April 2007
25. "Marrying In" Asimov's Science Fiction, June 2007
26. "Swing Time" Baen's Universe, June 2007
27. "Free Space" Baen's Universe, August 2007
28. "A Letter to Nancy" Realms of Fantasy, August 2008
29. "Little Black Dress" Spicy Slipstream Stories, September 2008 (ed. by Jay Lake & Nick Mamatas)
30. "Gamma Ray vs. Death" Better Off Undead, November 2008 (anthology from DAW Books)
31. "The Nymph's Child" Fast Ships, Black Sails, Fall 2008
32. "The Happiest Place" Realms of Fantasy, February 2009
33. "1977" Ravens in the Library, Spring 2009 (ed. Phil Brucato and Sandra Buskirk)
34. "Watching" Killer Rabbits and Zombie Raccoons, October 2009 (ed. Kerrie Hughes)
35. "The Book of Daniel" Talebones 39, Winter 2009
36. "Just Another Word" Realms of Fantasy, April 2010
37. "The Girls from Avenger" Warriors, ed. George R. R. Martin and Gardner Dozois, March 2010.
38. "Amaryllis," Lightspeed Magazine, debut issue, June 2010
39. "Rooftops," Songs of Love and Death, ed. George R. R. Martin and Gardner Dozois, November 2010.
40. "Threads," The Thackery T. Lambshead Cabinet of Curiosities, ed. by Jeff and Ann VanderMeer, June 2011
41. "Now Purple With Love's Wound," Brave New Love, ed. Paula Guran, February 2012
42. "Harry and Marlow and the Talisman of the Cult of Egil," Lightspeed, February 2012
43. "Don Quixote," Armored, ed. John Joseph Adams, March 2012
44. "Astrophilia" Clarkesworld, July 2012
45. "Harry and Marlowe Meet the Founder of the Aetherian Revolution" The Mad Scientist's Guide to World Domination, ed. John Joseph Adams, February 2013
46. "Game of Chance" Unfettered, ed Shawn Speakman, June 2013
47. "The Art of Homecoming" Asimov's Science Fiction, July 2013
48. "The Best We Can," Tor.com, July 2013. Reprinted in The Year's Best Science Fiction 31, edited by Gardner Dozois.
49. "Raisa Stepanova," Dangerous Women, ed. George R.R. Martin and Gardner Dozois, December 2013.
50. "Harry and Marlowe and the Intrigues at the Aetherian Exhibition," Lightspeed Magazine, February 2014.
51. "Salvage", Lightspeed Magazine Special Women Destroy Science Fiction! issue, June 2014.
52. "Roaring Twenties," Rogues, ed. George R.R. Martin and Gardner Dozois, June 2014.
53. "Harry and Marlowe Versus the Haunted Locomotive of the Rockies," Lightspeed Magazine, July 2014.
54. "G.I. Joe: Luck Be a Lady," Kindle Worlds, July 2014.
55. "That Game We Played During The War", Tor.com, March 2016
56. "Where Would You Be Now?" Tor.com, February 2018. Prequel to Bannerless.
57. "Sinew and Steel and What They Told," Tor.com, March 2020
58. "Polly And (Not) Charles Conquer The Solar System" Clarkesworld, August 2022
