= Down These Strange Streets =

2011 urban fantasy anthology edited by George R. R. Martin and Gardner Dozois

- First edition cover
- Editors: George R. R. Martin; Gardner Dozois
- Author: Various
- Language: English
- Genre: Urban fantasy
- Published: October 4, 2011
- Publisher: Ace Books
- Publication place: United States
- Media type: Print (Hardcover)
- Pages: 496
- ISBN: 0441020747

Down These Strange Streets is an urban fantasy anthology edited by George R. R. Martin and Gardner Dozois and released on October 4, 2011.

== Contents ==
- “The Bastard Stepchild” (Introduction) by George R. R. Martin
- “Death by Dahlia” by Charlaine Harris
- “The Bleeding Shadow” by Joe R. Lansdale
- “Hungry Heart” by Simon R. Green
- “Styx and Stones” by Steven Saylor
- “Pain and Suffering” by S. M. Stirling
- “It’s Still the Same Old Story” by Carrie Vaughn
- “The Lady Is a Screamer” by Conn Iggulden
- “Hellbender" by Laurie R. King
- “Shadow Thieves” by Glen Cook
- “No Mystery, No Miracle” by Melinda Snodgrass
- “The Difference Between a Puzzle and a Mystery” by M. L. N. Hanover
- “The Curious Affair of the Deodand” by Lisa Tuttle
- Lord John and the Plague of Zombies by Diana Gabaldon (novella)
- “Beware the Snake” by John Maddox Roberts
- “In Red, With Pearls” by Patricia Briggs
- “The Adakian Eagle” by Bradley Denton
