= Full Moon City =

- Cover of first edition
- Editors: Darrell Schweitzer; Martin H. Greenberg
- Language: English
- Genre: Fantasy/horror
- Publisher: Pocket Books
- Publication date: 2010
- Publication place: United States
- Media type: Print (paperback)
- Pages: xii, 307 pp.
- ISBN: 978-1-4165-8413-1

Full Moon City is an anthology of fantasy/horror short stories on the subject of lycanthropy, edited by Darrell Schweitzer and Martin H. Greenberg. It was first published as an ebook by Pocket Books in February 2010, and in paperback by the same publisher in March 2010.

== Summary ==
The book collects fifteen short stories by various authors, with an introduction by the editor.

== Contents ==
- "Introduction: Children of the Night" (Darrell Schweitzer)
- "The Truth About Werewolves" (Lisa Tuttle)
- "Innocent" (Gene Wolfe)
- "Kitty Learns the Ropes" (Carrie Vaughn)
- "No Children, No Pets" (Esther M. Friesner)
- "Sea Warg" (Tanith Lee)
- "Country Mothers' Sons" (Holly Phillips)
- "A Most Unusual Greyhound" (Mike Resnick)
- "The Bitch" (P. D. Cacek)
- "The Aarne-Thompson Classification Revue" (Holly Black)
- "Weredog of Bucharest" (Ian Watson)
- "I Was a Middle-Age Werewolf" (Ron Goulart)
- "Kvetchula's Daughter" (Darrell Schweitzer)
- "And Bob's Your Uncle" (Chelsea Quinn Yarbro)
- "The Bank Job" (Gregory Frost)
- "La Lune T'attend" (Peter S. Beagle)

== Reception ==
Publishers Weekly called the anthology "an uneven collection of urban werewolf tales written by some of fantasy's biggest names," stating that "[f]or every tale that pushes the boundaries, two more are content to go through the motions, making this a fairly average affair." The reviewer singled out the pieces by Black, Lee and Friesner for particular praise, but noted that [v]ery few other stories rise above satisfactory or mildly memorable." Editor Schweitzer's own contribution was called "humorous" but "out of place" due to its "vampire-centric" nature.

The anthology was also reviewed by Rich Horton in Locus no. 591, April 2010 and Vicky Gilpin in Dead Reckonings no. 8, Fall 2010.
