= Kitty Norville =

Protagonist of a series of novels by Carrie Vaughn

Kitty Norville is the main character of a series of novels by Carrie Vaughn. She is a werewolf who hosts a popular syndicated radio phone-in show based in Denver called "The Midnight Hour". The program focuses on supernatural issues, beings and creatures she encounters.

== Kitty and the Midnight Hour ==
Kitty and the Midnight Hour
- First edition cover
- Author: Carrie Vaughn
- Cover artist: Craig White
- Language: English
- Series: Kitty Norville
- Genre: Fantasy novel
- Publisher: Warner Books
- Publication date: 2005
- Publication place: United States
- Media type: Print (Paperback)
- Pages: 288 pp (first edition, paperback)
- ISBN: 0-446-61641-9 (first edition, paperback)
- OCLC: 62096687

"Kitty" Norville, a late-night radio DJ, accidentally starts a late-night talk show about werewolves, vampires, and other mythical creatures. The catch is she is a werewolf herself, and the secret is supposed to stay silent.

=== Plot points ===
- Carl is the Alpha of the pack and therefore able to physically dominate his pack.
- Kitty spends the novel dealing with multiple attempts on her life.
- A preacher is offering to "save" the supernatural community if they come and join his traveling Bible show. A Midnight Hour listener calls in to confirm Kitty's suspicions that all is not right with this show. This plot point is completed in Kitty Goes to Washington.
- Being supernatural is not a state Kitty wants her listeners to aspire to. While it may sound interesting, the reality is not what they expect.

== Kitty Goes to Washington ==
Kitty Goes to Washington
- Author: Carrie Vaughn
- Cover artist: Craig White
- Language: English
- Series: Kitty Norville
- Genre: Fantasy novel
- Publisher: Little, Brown
- Publication date: July 2006
- Publication place: United States
- Media type: Print (Paperback)
- Pages: 260 pp (first edition, paperback)
- ISBN: 0-446-61642-7 (first edition, paperback)

Some editions of this novel also includes the short story Kitty Meets the Band.

=== Plot points ===
- Kitty learns more about vampires, whom she was generally suspicious of, and stays with one during her trip. This vampire has kept close ties to her mortal family, who all seem to love their many times great-grandmother.
- A new love interest appears in the form of a were-jaguar, names Luis who is also part of the Brazilian embassy.
- Ben's relationship with Kitty and his personality are developed.
- The supernatural community claims werewolves and vampires are created by a disease. Government researchers decide to medically study victims of such attacks.
- Kitty meets a psychic and television personality. At first she believes he is a hoax, but after speaking with him for a few minutes she becomes convinced he is genuine and realizes how ironic her behavior is given her condition.
- Kitty and company defeat a powerful fae posing as a Christian preacher who can "cure" werewolves and vampires. Instead, he is feeding on the hopes and fears of his supernatural congregation. The fae is banished from this world, and may or may not return in future installments. The supernaturals under his control were freed.
- The crazed Senator Duke kidnaps Kitty. He wants to show the world how vicious werewolves are, and keeps her caged up and under cameras during a full moon. She changes, but rather than being vicious and entertaining for the newsmen, she curls up in the back of her cell.

== Kitty Takes a Holiday ==
Kitty Takes a Holiday
- First edition cover
- Author: Carrie Vaughn
- Cover artist: Craig White
- Language: English
- Series: Kitty Norville
- Genre: Fantasy
- Publisher: Little, Brown
- Publication date: April 2007
- Publication place: United States
- Media type: Print (Paperback)
- Pages: 336 pp (first edition, paperback)
- ISBN: 0-446-61874-8 (first edition, paperback)

After her lycanthropy is captured on film in Washington, Kitty decides to go on vacation. She rents a cabin and decides to write a book of her memoirs. Trouble quickly ensues as slaughtered animals are left outside her door and a visitor from her past arrives with unexpected news.

=== Plot summary ===
With the money she got from her lawsuits in Washington, Kitty has decided to take some time off from her radio show. Inspired by Thoreau and his experiences at Walden, she rents a cabin and begins to write a book, although she has a hard time focusing.

During Kitty's vacation, Cormac drives up to her cabin with an injured Ben and tells Kitty that he had called Ben to help with a werewolf hunt. Ben was attacked and infected by one of the werewolves, who Cormac then killed. They mend Ben the best they can while Ben makes it clear that he would rather be dead than a werewolf. Kitty decides that she is going to show Ben that he can live with lycanthropy. She takes him in, then finds that the only way to make him safe is to create a new pack of the two of them, which makes her alpha. She is with him for his first change on the full moon.

While Ben is being tended to, Kitty tells Cormac about the dead animals that have been left on her door step along with small barbed-wire crosses. He thinks that these objects are part of a curse and makes some calls. The objects begin to get worse as a circle of crosses are left surrounding Kitty's cabin and skinned animals are left hanging in the trees. Cormac continues to look into the curse, until he finds Ben and Kitty sleeping in each other's arms. Upset, he gets in his Jeep and leaves.

A few nights later, Tony Rivera shows up at the cabin, called by Cormac. He tells Kitty that he can find out who is attempting to use magic on her. He traces the magic back to Alice and Sheriff Marks, but it backfired and drew dark energy to the region rather than repelling it. The locals agree to break the curse on Kitty. As they are about to lift it, the use of magic draws the attention of the skinwalker that had been involved in the attack on Ben. Kitty tries to fend it off, but it pins her to the ground and attacks. Cormac arrives in time to injure the skinwalker, who shifts back to Miriam Wilson, and then he kills her.

Despite the killing being self-defense, Cormac is arrested. Ben and Kitty work to prove his innocence by driving to New Mexico, where Ben had been attacked, to try to find evidence that Miriam was a skinwalker. Though the local attorney believes in skin-walkers, he is being pressured by Sheriff Marks to press charges, and Cormac has too much of a record of skirting the law to not prosecute. Cormac takes a plea-bargain of four years in prison. Kitty ends her vacation after Cormac's trial, and goes back to her show, "Kitty and the Midnight Hour." She also finishes her book.

== Kitty and the Silver Bullet ==
Kitty and the Silver Bullet
- Pre-release Cover
- Author: Carrie Vaughn
- Cover artist: Craig White
- Language: English
- Series: Kitty Norville
- Genre: Fantasy
- Publisher: Warner Books
- Publication date: 2008
- Publication place: United States
- Media type: Print (Paperback)

The fourth book in the Kitty Norville series was released in 2008.

After visiting Cormac in jail, Kitty has a miscarriage. Kitty and Ben are visited by Rick, who tells them he needs to take over as head vampire of Denver and asks them if they will help. Kitty declines and Rick leaves. Later, Kitty is told that her mother may have cancer. Kitty rushes to Denver to see her mother taking Ben with her, and Kitty introduces Ben to her family. Kitty meets a new vampire: Mercedes Cook, an actress. Kitty then meets Carl and Meg again and they add to the problems with Rick and the head vampire problem, Ben becomes worried for Kitty's safety and teaches her how to use a gun. At the end Kitty shoots Meg and Carl is killed by his pack and Kitty and Ben become the Alpha pair of the pack. Ben also proposes to Kitty.

== Kitty and the Dead Man's Hand ==
Kitty and the Dead Man's Hand
- Author: Carrie Vaughn
- Cover artist: Craig White
- Language: English
- Series: Kitty Norville
- Genre: Fantasy novel
- Publisher: Warner Books
- Publication date: Feb 2009
- Publication place: United States
- Media type: Print (Paperback)
- Pages: 320
- ISBN: 0-446-19953-2

Already the alpha pair of Denver's werewolf pack, Kitty and Ben now plan to tie the knot by eloping to Vegas. Kitty is looking forward to sipping drinks by the pool and recording her popular radio show on live TV, but her hotel is filled with werewolf-hating bounty hunters. Elsewhere on the Strip, an old-school magician might be wielding real magic, the vampire community harbors a dark secret, and the star of a suspicious animal act is determined to seduce Kitty.

== Kitty Raises Hell ==
Kitty Raises Hell
- Author: Carrie Vaughn
- Cover artist: Craig White
- Language: English
- Series: Kitty Norville
- Genre: Fantasy novel
- Publisher: Warner Books
- Publication date: Apr 2009
- Publication place: United States
- Media type: Print (Paperback)
- Pages: 336
- ISBN: 0-446-19954-0

Sometimes what happens in Vegas doesn't stay in Vegas.

Kitty and Ben flee The City That Never Sleeps, thinking they were finished with the dangers there, but the sadistic cult of lycanthropes and their vampire priestess have laid a curse on Kitty in revenge for her disrupting their rituals. Starting at the next full moon, danger and destruction the form of fire strikes Kitty and the pack of werewolves she's sworn to protect.

She enlists the help of a group of TV paranormal investigators - one of whom has real psychic abilities - to help her get to the bottom of the curse that's been laid on her. Rick, the Master vampire of Denver, believes a deeper plot lies behind the curse, and he and Kitty argue about whether or not to accept the help of a professional demon hunter - and vampire - named Roman, who arrives a little too conveniently in the nick of time.

Unable to rely on Rick, and unwilling to accept Roman's offer of help for a price, Kitty and her band of allies, including Vegas magician Odysseus Grant and Kitty's own radio audience, mount a trap for the supernatural being behind the curse, a destructive force summoned by the vengeful cult, a supernatural being that none of them ever thought to face.

== Kitty's House of Horrors ==
Kitty's House of Horrors
- Author: Carrie Vaughn
- Cover artist: Craig White
- Language: English
- Series: Kitty Norville
- Genre: Fantasy novel
- Publisher: Warner Books
- Publication date: Jan 2010
- Publication place: United States
- Media type: Print (Paperback)
- Pages: 304
- ISBN: 0-446-19955-9

Kitty has agreed to appear on TV's first all-supernatural reality show. She's expecting cheesy competitions and manufactured drama starring shapeshifters, vampires, and psychics. But what begins as a publicity stunt turn into a fight for her life.

The cast members, including Kitty, arrive at the remote mountain lodge where the show is set. As soon as filming starts, violence erupts and Kitty suspects that the show is a cover for a nefarious plot. Then the cameras stop rolling, cast members start dying, and Kitty realizes she and her monster housemates are ironically the ultimate prize in a very different game. Stranded with no power, no phones, and no way to know who can be trusted, she must find a way to defeat the evil closing in before it kills them all.

== Kitty Goes to War ==
Kitty Goes to War
- Author: Carrie Vaughn
- Cover artist: Craig White
- Language: English
- Series: Kitty Norville
- Genre: Fantasy novel
- Publisher: Tor Books
- Publication date: Jun 2010
- Publication place: United States
- Media type: Print (Paperback)
- Pages: 352
- ISBN: 0-7653-6561-8

Kitty is contacted by a friend at the NIH's Center for the Study of Paranatural Biology. Three Army soldiers recently returned from the war in Afghanistan are being held at Ft. Carson in Colorado Springs. They're killer werewolves—and post traumatic stress has left them unable to control their shape-shifting and unable to interact with people. Kitty agrees to see them, hoping to help by bringing them into her pack.

Meanwhile, Kitty gets sued for libel by CEO Harold Franklin after featuring Speedy Mart—his nationwide chain of 24-hour convenience stores with a reputation for attracting supernatural unpleasantness—on her show.

Very bad weather is on the horizon.

== Kitty's Big Trouble ==
Kitty's Big Trouble
- Author: Carrie Vaughn
- Cover artist: Craig White
- Language: English
- Series: Kitty Norville
- Genre: Fantasy novel
- Publisher: Tor Books
- Publication date: Jun 2011
- Publication place: United States
- Media type: Print (Paperback)
- ISBN: 0-7653-6565-0

Kitty's recent run-in with werewolves traumatized by the horrors of war has made her start wondering how long the US government might have been covertly using werewolves in combat. Have any famous names in our own history might have actually been supernatural? She's got suspicions about William Tecumseh Sherman. Then an interview with the right vampire puts her on the trail of Wyatt Earp, vampire hunter.

But her investigations lead her to a clue about enigmatic vampire Roman and the mysterious Long Game played by vampires through the millennia.

== Kitty's Greatest Hits ==
Kitty's Greatest Hits
- Author: Carrie Vaughn
- Cover artist: Craig White
- Language: English
- Series: Kitty Norville
- Genre: Fantasy novel
- Publisher: Tor Books
- Publication date: Aug 2011
- Publication place: United States
- Media type: Print (Paperback)
- Pages: 320
- ISBN: 0-7653-2957-3

Compilation of Kitty Norville short fiction including 2 new stories.

Includes:

- "Conquistador de la Noche", 2009 (the origin story of Denver's Master vampire, Rick)
- "A Princess of Spain", 2007
- "Il Est Né", 2008
- "The Book of Daniel", 2009
- "The Temptation of Robin Green", 2009
- "Looking After Family", 2007
- "God's Creatures", 2010
- "Wild Ride", 2010 (how Kitty's friend T.J. became a werewolf)
- "Winnowing the Herd", 2006
- "Kitty and the Mosh Pit of the Damned", 2006
- "Kitty's Zombie New Year", 2007
- "Life Is the Teacher", 2008 (revisits Emma, the human-turned-unwilling-vampire who serves the vampire Master of Washington, D.C.)
- "You're on the Air", 2011 (about one of Kitty’s callers after he hangs up the phone)
- "Long Time Waiting", 2011 (a novella that reveals what happened to Cormac in prison)

== Kitty Steals the Show ==
Kitty Steals the Show
- Author: Carrie Vaughn
- Cover artist: Craig White
- Language: English
- Series: Kitty Norville
- Genre: Fantasy novel
- Publisher: Tor Books
- Publication date: Aug 2012
- Publication place: United States
- Media type: Print (Paperback)
- Pages: 352
- ISBN: 978-0765365668

Kitty is set to attend The First International Conference on Paranatural Studies in London with Ben and Cormac/Amelia. While there she meets Ned, head vampire of London, and Caleb, alpha werewolf of London. Kitty learns more about the Long Game while running into old friends and enemies (Joseph Tyler, Luis, Dr. Flemming, Merecedes Cook) along with new allies and enemies.

== Kitty Rocks the House ==
Kitty Rocks the House
- Author: Carrie Vaughn
- Cover artist: Craig White
- Language: English
- Series: Kitty Norville
- Genre: Fantasy
- Publisher: Tor Books
- Publication place: United States
- Media type: Print (Paperback)

On the heels of Kitty's return from London, a new werewolf shows up in Denver, one who threatens to split the pack by challenging Kitty's authority at every turn. The timing could not be worse; Kitty needs all the allies she can muster to go against the ancient vampire, Roman, if she's to have any hope of defeating his Long Game. But there's more to this intruder than there seems, and Kitty must uncover the truth, fast. Meanwhile, Cormac pursues an unknown entity wreaking havoc across Denver; and a vampire from the Order of St. Lazarus tempts Rick with the means to transform his life forever.

== Kitty in the Underworld ==
Kitty in the Underworld
- Author: Carrie Vaughn
- Cover artist: Craig White
- Language: English
- Series: Kitty Norville
- Genre: Fantasy
- Publisher: Tor Books
- Publication date: June 2013
- Publication place: United States
- Media type: Print (Paperback)
- Pages: 320
- ISBN: 978-0765368683

As Denver adjusts to a new master vampire, Kitty gets word of an intruder in the Denver werewolf pack’s territory, and she investigates the challenge to her authority. She follows the scent of the lycanthrope through the mountains where she is lured into a trap, tranquilized, and captured. When she wakes up, she finds herself in a defunct silver mine: the perfect cage for a werewolf. Her captors are a mysterious cult seeking to induct Kitty into their ranks in a ritual they hope will put an end to Dux Bellorum. Though skeptical of their power, even Kitty finds herself struggling to resist joining their cause. Whatever she decides, they expect Kitty to join them in their plot, willingly or otherwise.

== Low Midnight ==
Low Midnight
- Author: Carrie Vaughn
- Cover artist: Craig White
- Language: English
- Series: Kitty Norville (spinoff)
- Genre: Fantasy novel
- Publisher: Tor Books
- Publication date: December 2014
- Publication place: United States
- Media type: Print (Paperback)
- Pages: 320
- ISBN: 978-0-7653-6869-0

Unlike the other novels in the series, this book follows Cormac, although Kitty appears repeatedly to assist him. Cormac tries to decode the journal given to Kitty by the sorceress in the previous novel. The path leads to western Colorado and the sorceress' aunt, a low-level witch who had introduced her to magic. As a price for helping to decode the journal, the aunt asks Cormac to solve a local hundred-year-old murder, leading him into trouble with his former militia acquaintances.

== Kitty Saves the World ==
Kitty Saves the World
- Author: Carrie Vaughn
- Cover artist: Craig White
- Language: English
- Series: Kitty Norville
- Genre: Fantasy
- Publisher: Tor Books
- Publication date: August 2015
- Publication place: United States
- Media type: Print (Paperback)
- Pages: 336
- ISBN: 978-0765368706

Following the discoveries made by Cormac in Low Midnight, Kitty and her allies are ready to strike. But, when their assassination attempt on the evil vampire Dux Bellorum fails, Kitty finds herself running out of time. The elusive vampire lord has begun his apocalyptic end game, and Kitty still doesn't know where he will strike.

Kitty and her pack experiences pressure in Denver through Dux Bellorum's cult. The stakes of winning were low, she needs to call for her allies so she can save the town.

== The Immortal Conquistador ==
A collection of short stories published in March 2020.

A Spanish conquistador arrives in the new world, becomes a vampire, and spends the next 500 years defending his friends and territory, eventually meeting Kitty, and then joining the Order of Saint Lazarus of the Shadows.

Don Ricardo de Avila y Zacatecas, the last surviving member of Coronado’s company, Conquistador de la Noche, once the Master of Santa Fe, and until last week the Master of Denver. Also called Rick.

— Carrie Vaughn, "El conquistador del tiempo"

- "Preface" (Rick arrives in Europe after having spent 500 years in North America)
- "Conquistador de la noche" (also published in Kitty's Greatest Hits)
- "El hidalgo de la noche" (no longer the only vampire in North America, Rick has to deal with competition)
- "Dead Men in Central City" (Rick meets Doc Holliday)
- "El conquistador del tiempo" (Rick gets caught at a crossroads fight between the North American vampires and the forces of Dux Bellorum/Roman)

== Kitty's Mix-tape ==
Short story collection published in October 2020.

Contains:

- "Kitty Walks on By, Calls Your Name"
- "It’s Still the Same Old Story"
- "The Island of Beasts"
- "The Beaux Wilde"
- "Unternehmen Werwolf"
- "Kitty and the Full Super Bloodmoon Thing"
- "Kitty and Cormac’s Excellent Adventure"
- "Sealskin"
- "The Arcane Art of Misdirection"
- "What Happened to Ben in Vegas"
- "Kitty and the Super Blue Blood or Whatever Moon Thing"
- "Defining Shadows"
- "Bellum Romanum"
- "Kitty Learns the Ropes"
- "Kitty Busts the Feds"
