= Warriors (anthology) =

2010 fiction anthology edited by George R. R. Martin and Gardner Dozois

- First edition cover
- Editors: George R. R. Martin; Gardner Dozois
- Author: Various
- Language: English
- Genre: Science fiction/Fantasy
- Published: March 16, 2010
- Publisher: Tor Books
- Publication place: United States
- Media type: Print (Hardcover & Paperback)
- Pages: 736
- ISBN: 978-0-76532-048-3
- Followed by: Dangerous Women

Warriors is a cross-genre, all-original fiction anthology featuring stories on the subjects of war and warriors; it was edited by George R. R. Martin and Gardner Dozois. The book's Introduction, "Stories from the Spinner Rack", was written by Martin. This anthology was first published in hardcover by Tor Books on March 16, 2010. It won a Locus Award for Best Anthology in 2011.

The book was later split and republished in paperback as Warriors 1 (ISBN 9780765360267, published in 2010); Warriors 2 (ISBN 9780765360274, published in 2011) and Warriors 3 (ISBN 9780765360281, also published in 2011). Stories from the Spinner Rack is included in all the three split books.

== Contents ==
- "The King of Norway", by Cecelia Holland; included in Warriors 1
- "Forever Bound", by Joe Haldeman; included in Warriors 1
- "The Triumph", by Robin Hobb; included in Warriors 3
- "Clean Slate", by Lawrence Block; included in Warriors 3
- "And Ministers of Grace", by Tad Williams; included in Warriors 1
- "Soldierin'", by Joe Lansdale; included in Warriors 3
- "Dirae", by Peter S. Beagle; included in Warriors 2
- "The Eagle and the Rabbit", by Steven Saylor; included in Warriors 1
- "Seven Years from Home", by Naomi Novik; included in Warriors 2
- The Custom of the Army, by Diana Gabaldon (novella); included in Warriors 3
- "The Pit", by James Rollins; included in Warriors 3
- "Out of the Dark", by David Weber; included in Warriors 2
- "The Girls from Avenger", by Carrie Vaughn; included in Warriors 3
- "Ancient Ways", by S. M. Stirling; included in Warriors 2
- "Ninieslando" by Howard Waldrop; included in Warriors 2
- "Recidivist" by Gardner Dozois; included in Warriors 2
- "My Name is Legion", by David Morrell; included in Warriors 3
- "Defenders of the Frontier", by Robert Silverberg; included in Warriors 1
- "The Scroll", by David W. Ball; included in Warriors 2
- The Mystery Knight, by George R. R. Martin (novella); included in Warriors 1

== Reception ==
Warriors won a Locus Award for Best Anthology in 2011.
