= Shaina Fewell =

Television writer and producer

Shaina Fewell is an American television writer and producer. In 2017, she became writer and producer on the television show Outlander season 4 for Starz and produced 13 episodes of the series. She also wrote episode 6 and co-wrote episode 11 of season 4. She was Supervising Producer on season 5 & season 6. Most recently, Shaina served as Co-Executive Producer and Writer on Fate: The Winx Saga. In 2016, Fewell was Writer Co-Producer on Guilt, which debuted June 13, 2016 on Freeform.

In 2012, Fewell wrote for Lifetime Network's hit TV series The Client List as Executive Story Editor where she penned the show's first musical episode.

Prior to this, she wrote for One Tree Hill at The CW for three seasons. Episodes written by Fewell include: The Killing Moon (2012); The Drinks We Drank Last Night (2011); and, Learning To Fall (2010).

Fewell's passion for music and travel inspired the television show Project MyWorld broadcast on The 101 Network (an exclusive service of DirecTV), which she co-created, executive produced and starred in, showcasing her global travels for two seasons as she discovered up and coming indie bands.

Fewell has developed several shows including: a super-heroine project with Stan Lee and a time travel project with Universal Studios and Parkes-MacDonald.

Fewell is currently developing a TV show for Insurrection Media based on a book called Mila 2.0 optioned from HarperCollins Publishers. Executive Producer David Alpert and Skybound Entertainment are attached.

== Filmography ==
=== Television ===
Year	Title	Role	Notes
2006-07	Project MyWorld	Writer, Executive Producer	17 episodes
2010-12	One Tree Hill	Guest Star, Writer	18 episodes
2013	The Client List	Writer	2 episodes
2016	Guilt	Writer, Co-Producer	10 episodes
2018-22	Outlander	Writer, Supervising Producer, Producer	33 episodes
2022	Fate:The Winx Saga	Writer, Co-Executive Producer	7 episodes
