= Harlan Ellison bibliography =

This is a list of works by Harlan Ellison (1934–2018). It includes his literary output, screenplays and teleplays, voiceover work, and other fields of endeavor.

== Novels and novellas ==
- Web of the City (1958; originally published as Rumble)
- The Man with Nine Lives (1960; revised and reprinted in 2011 under the author's preferred title The Sound of a Scythe)
- Spider Kiss (1961; originally published as Rockabilly)
- Doomsman (1967; re-issued under the author's preferred title Way of an Assassin in the collection Rough Beasts)
- A Boy and His Dog (1969; made into a film)
- The Starlost #1: Phoenix Without Ashes (1975; adaptation by Edward Bryant of Ellison's TV pilot script)
- All the Lies That Are My Life (1980; later included in the author's 1980 collection Shatterday)
- Run for the Stars (1991; a 1957 novella here republished in a preferred text edition as part of a Tor Double)
- Mefisto in Onyx (1993; later included in the author's 1997 collection Slippage)
- Blood's a Rover (2018, Subterranean Press; a "fix-up" novel, consisting of "Eggsucker" and "Run Spot, Run", two short stories, as well as A Boy and His Dog and an unproduced teleplay from the 1970s, entitled "Blood's a Rover")

== Short story collections ==
- The Deadly Streets (1958)
- Sex Gang (1959) (as by Paul Merchant)
- A Touch of Infinity (1960)
- Children of the Streets (1961) (originally published as The Juvies)
- Gentleman Junkie and Other Stories of the Hung-Up Generation (1961)
- Ellison Wonderland (1962) (also published as Earthman, Go Home!) Ellison calls his home in Sherman Oaks, California "Ellison Wonderland."
- Paingod and Other Delusions (1965)
- I Have No Mouth, and I Must Scream (1967)
- From the Land of Fear (1967)
- Love Ain't Nothing But Sex Misspelled (1968)
- The Beast That Shouted Love at the Heart of the World (1969)
- Over the Edge (1970)
- Partners in Wonder (1971) (collaborations with 14 other writers)
- Approaching Oblivion (1974)
- Deathbird Stories (1975)
- No Doors, No Windows (1975)
- Strange Wine (1978)
- Shatterday (1980) (reissued 2007 by Edgeworks Abbey/Tachyon Publications)
- Stalking the Nightmare (1982)
- Angry Candy (1988)
- Mind Fields (1994) (33 stories inspired by the art of Jacek Yerka)
- Slippage (1997)
- Troublemakers (2001) (collection produced for the Young Adult market and featuring, for the most part, previously collected material)
- Pulling a Train (2012, Kicks Books)
- Rough Beasts (2012, Edgeworks Abbey)
- Getting in the Wind (2013, Kicks Books)
- Honorable Whoredom at a Penny a Word (2013, Edgeworks Abbey)
- Again, Honorable Whoredom at a Penny a Word (2014, Edgeworks Abbey)
- The Top of the Volcano: The Award-Winning Stories of Harlan Ellison (2014, Subterranean Press)
- 8 in 80 (2014, Edgeworks Abbey)
- Can & Can'tankerous (2015, Subterranean Press)
- Coffin Nails (2016, Charnel House)
- Ellison Under Glass (2018, Charnel House)
- Possibly Impossible (2021, Edgeworks Abbey)
- Harlan Ellison's Greatest Hits (2024) (posthumous short story collection, edited by J. Michael Straczynski)

== Retrospectives and omnibus collections ==
- Alone Against Tomorrow: a 10-Year Survey (1971) (published in the UK in two volumes as All the Sounds of Fear (1973) and The Time of the Eye (1974))
- The Fantasies of Harlan Ellison (1979) (contains "Paingod and Other Delusions" (1965) and "I Have No Mouth, and I Must Scream" (1967))
- The Essential Ellison: a 35-Year Retrospective (1987) (edited by Terry Dowling with Richard Delap and Gil Lamont)
- Dreams With Sharp Teeth (1991) (contains "I Have No Mouth, and I Must Scream" (1967), Deathbird Stories (1975) and Shatterday (1980))
- Edgeworks. 1 (1996) (contains "Over the Edge" (1970) and "An Edge in My Voice" (1985))
- Edgeworks. 2 (1996) (contains "Spider Kiss" (1961) and "Stalking the Nightmare" (1982))
- Edgeworks. 3 (1997) (contains "The Harlan Ellison Hornbook" (1990) and "Harlan Ellison's Movie" (1990))
- Edgeworks. 4 (1997) (contains Love Ain't Nothing But Sex Misspelled (1968) and The Beast That Shouted Love at the Heart of the World (1969))
- The Essential Ellison: a 50-Year Retrospective Revised & Expanded (2001) (edited by Terry Dowling with Richard Delap and Gil Lamont)
- The Glass Teat Omnibus: The Glass Teat and The Other Glass Teat (2011) (published by Charnel House, a handmade book published in a very limited edition; includes a February 2011 audio recording of Ellison reading "Welcome to the Gulag", a new introduction written for this updated publication of his essays on and criticism of television.)
- The Top of the Volcano: The Award-winning Stories of Harlan Ellison (2014)
- Fingerprints On the Sky: The Authorized Harlan Ellison Bibliography, The Illustrated Reader's Guide edited by Tim Richmond (2015) Subterranean Press

=== Note ===
The White Wolf Edgeworks Series was originally scheduled to consist of 31 titles reprinted over the course of 20 omnibus volumes. Although an ISBN was created for Edgeworks. 5 (1998), which was to contain both Glass Teat books, this title never appeared. The series is notorious for its numerous typographical errors.

== Nonfiction ==
- Memos from Purgatory (1961)
- The Glass Teat (1970) (essays of opinion on television, 1968–1970)
- The Other Glass Teat (1975) (further essays of opinion on television, 1970–1972)
- The Book of Ellison (1978) (edited by Andrew Porter)
- Sleepless Nights in the Procrustean Bed (1984) (edited by Marty Clark)
- An Edge in My Voice (1985)
- Harlan Ellison's Watching (1989) (reissued 2008 by M Press)
- The Harlan Ellison Hornbook (1990)
- Harlan Ellison's Endlessly Watching (2014, Edgeworks Abbey)
- The Last Person to Marry a Duck Lives 300 Years Ago: Pointed Essays (2016, Edgeworks Abbey)
- FOE: Friends of Ellison (2019, Edgeworks Abbey)
- Why Do You Call Me Ishmael When You Know My Name Is Bernie? (2019, Edgeworks Abbey)
- Ask Uncle Harlan (2020, Edgeworks Abbey)

== Editorials ==
- "Star Trek" (May 1987; The Magazine of Fantasy & Science Fiction)
- "The End of Horror" (January 1991; The Magazine of Fantasy & Science Fiction)

== Television plays ==
TV series	Episode	Original aired	Note(s)
Route 66	"A Gift for a Warrior?"	1963	Script by Larry Marcus based on a story by Ellison
Ripcord	"Where Do Elephants Go to Die?"	1963	—N/a
Burke's Law	"Who Killed Alex Debbs?"	October 25, 1963, on ABC	—N/a
Burke's Law	"Who Killed Purity Mather?"	December 6, 1963, on ABC	—N/a
Burke's Law	"Who Killed Andy Zygmunt?"	March 13, 1964, on ABC	—N/a
Burke's Law	"Who Killed 1/2 of Glory Lee?"	May 8, 1964, on ABC	—N/a
The Outer Limits	"Soldier"	September 19, 1964, on ABC	—N/a
Voyage to the Bottom of the Sea	"The Price of Doom"	October 12, 1964, on ABC	Credited as "Cord Wainer Bird"
The Outer Limits	"Demon with a Glass Hand"	October 17, 1964, on ABC	Won the Writers Guild of America Award
The Alfred Hitchcock Hour	"Memo from Purgatory"	December 21, 1964, on NBC	Based on his autobiographical story "The Gang"
The Man from U.N.C.L.E.	"The Sort of Do-It-Yourself Dreadful Affair"	September 23, 1966, on NBC	—N/a
The Man from U.N.C.L.E.	"The Pieces of Fate Affair"	February 24, 1967, on NBC	Wrote the script and co-wrote the story with Yale Udoff
Star Trek	"The City on the Edge of Forever"	April 6, 1967, on NBC	Won the Hugo Award and Writers Guild of America Award for his original script
Cimarron Strip	"Knife in the Darkness"	January 25, 1968, on CBS	—N/a
The Flying Nun	"You Can't Get There from Here"	April 11, 1968, on ABC	Credited as "Cordwainer Bird"
The Young Lawyers	"The Whimper of Whipped Dogs"	March 10, 1971, on ABC	Unrelated to the Ellison story of the same name.
Circle of Fear	"Earth, Air, Fire and Water"	January 19, 1973, on NBC	Co-wrote the story with D. C. Fontana, who wrote the script
The Starlost	"Voyage of Discovery" (Original title "Phoenix Without Ashes")	September 22, 1973	Credited as "Cordwainer Bird"; won the Writers Guild of America Award for his original script
Logan's Run	"Crypt"	November 7, 1977, on CBS	Story only; teleplay by Al Hayes
The Twilight Zone	"Paladin of the Lost Hour"	November 8, 1985, on CBS	Based on Ellison's short story of the same name; won the Writers Guild of America Award
The Twilight Zone	"Gramma"	February 14, 1986, on CBS	Based on the short story by Stephen King
The Twilight Zone	"Crazy as a Soup Sandwich"	April 1, 1989, in syndication	—N/a
Cadillacs and Dinosaurs	"Wildfire"	January 28, 1994, on CBS	Story only, teleplay by David Wise
Babylon 5	"A View from the Gallery"	February 11, 1998, on TNT	Co-wrote the story with J. Michael Straczynski, who wrote the script
The Hunger	"The Face of Helene Bournouw"	February 27, 1998, on Showtime	Credited as "Cordwainer Bird"
The Hunger	"Footsteps"	March 27, 1998, on Showtime	Story only; credited as "Cordwainer Bird"; teleplay by Gerald Wexler
Silver Surfer	"Antibody"	April 11, 1998, on Fox Kids	Story only; teleplay by Larry Brody and Michael Steven Gregory
Babylon 5	"Objects in Motion"	November 11, 1998, on TNT	Co-wrote the story with J. Michael Straczynski, who wrote the script
Masters of Science Fiction	"The Discarded"	August 25, 2007, on ABC	Co-wrote the script with Josh Olson; based on Ellison's short story "The Abnormals" (sometimes titled "The Discarded")
Love, Death & Robots	"Life Hutch"	May 14, 2021, on Netflix	Based on the short story by Ellison, screenplay by Philip Gelatt

== Published/produced screenplays and teleplays ==
- The Oscar, with Clarence Greene and Russell Rouse, from the novel by Richard Sale.
- Phoenix Without Ashes (original, unaired and unaltered, Writers Guild of America Award-winning teleplay), published in Faster Than Light (1975, Harper & Row), alongside original stories by George R.R. Martin and Ben Bova, and reprints by Isaac Asimov.
- I, Robot (1994), (based on stories by Isaac Asimov, illustrated by Mark Zug)
- The City on the Edge of Forever (1996), (Star Trek episode, original screenplay, with commentary. For an in-depth review of this book see. This script was also published in Six Science Fiction Plays (1976) edited by Roger Elwood)
- Harlan Ellison's Movie (1990), (unproduced feature-length screenplay serialised in Ellison's weekly newspaper column The Harlan Ellison Hornbook and collected in the omnibus volume Edgeworks. 3 (1996))
- Flintlock (unproduced Harlan Ellison teleplay) (1987), (unproduced pilot teleplay for a proposed 1972 TV series based on James Coburn's character in Our Man Flint, published in both editions of the retrospective volume The Essential Ellison (1987, 2001))
- The Whimper of Whipped Dogs (1975), (teleplay produced in the TV series The Young Lawyers, serialised in Ellison's weekly newspaper column The Glass Teat and collected in The Other Glass Teat (1975); unrelated to Ellison's later 1973 short story, "The Whimper of Whipped Dogs")
- The Whimper of Whipped Dogs (unfinished screenplay based on Ellison's 1973 short story of the same title as, but completely unrelated to the Young Lawyers teleplay referenced above; three treatments of the opening sequence were published in the June 1988 issue of The Magazine of Fantasy and Science Fiction and later appeared in Harlan Ellison's Watching (1989))
- Soldier, produced for The Outer Limits in 1964; published alongside the short story on which it was based in his 1967 collection From the Land of Fear.
- Crazy as a Soup Sandwich, produced for The Twilight Zone in 1989; published in his 1997 collection Slippage.
- Nackles, written for The Twilight Zone, an adaptation of a Donald E. Westlake story written, but never produced, in 1985, published in The Twilight Zone Magazine in 1986 and in a limited edition of Slippage which was published Mark Ziesing in 1997.
- Memo from Purgatory, produced for The Alfred Hitchcock Hour in 1964, Soldier, produced for The Outer Limits in 1964, Demon With a Glass Hand, produced for The Outer Limits in 1964, Paladin of the Lost Hour, produced for The Twilight Zone in 1985, Crazy as a Soup Sandwich produced for The Twilight Zone in 1989, and The Face of Helene Bournouw, produced for The Hunger in 1998, were all published in Brain Movies: The Original Teleplays of Harlan Ellison, Volume One, published by Edgeworks Abbey/Publishing 180 in 2011.
- Killing Bernstein, written, but unproduced, for Darkroom, 1982, Deeper Than the Darkness, retitled "A Knife in the Darkness", produced for Cimarron Strip in 1968, Mealtime, retitled "The Price of Doom", produced for Voyage to the Bottom of the Sea in 1964, The Sort of Do-It-Yourself Dreadful Affair, produced for The Man From U.N.C.L.E. in 1966, The Pieces of Fate Affair, produced for The Man From U.N.C.L.E. in 1967, and Phoenix Without Ashes, the pilot for The Starlost that was rewritten and retitled as "Voyage of Discovery", produced in 1973, are all collected in Brain Movies: The Original Teleplays of Harlan Ellison, Volume Two, published by Edgeworks Abbey/Publishing 180 in 2011.
- None of the Above, an adaptation of the Norman Spinrad novel Bug Jack Barron, written for director Costa-Gavras in the early 1980s, published by Edgeworks Abbey in November 2012.
- Cutter's World, an original, two-hour 1987 pilot teleplay for a western-tinged science fiction series for CBS, that was to have been directed by Roger Corman, Who Killed Alex Debbs?, a script that was produced for the hit 1960s show, Burke's Law, the initial outline for Demon with a Glass Hand, and The Ship That Kills, an unproduced story outline for a 1974–1975 Depression-era series called The Manhunter, starring Ken Howard, are collected in Brain Movies Vol. 3, published by Edgeworks Abbey and available from HarlanEllisonBooks.com.
- Brillo, an unproduced, two-hour teleplay pilot, written in collaboration with Ben Bova, for ABC, Who Killed Purity Mather?, written and produced for Burke's Law, and Jeffrey's Being Quiet, written for Sixth Sense, are collected in Brain Movies Vol. 4, published by Edgeworks Abbey and available from HarlanEllisonBooks.com.
- The Dark Forces, an unproduced pilot, written for NBC, Who Killed Andy Zygmunt?, written and produced for Burke's Law, Where Do the Elephants Go to Die?, written and produced for Ripcord, an unproduced teleplay for The Rat Patrol as well as outlines for Batman and Logan's Run are collected in Brain Movies Vol. 5, published by Edgeworks Abbey and available from HarlanEllisonBooks.com.
- Brain Movies: The Original Teleplays of Harlan Ellison, Volume One (2013, Edgeworks Abbey)
- Brain Movies: The Original Teleplays of Harlan Ellison, Volume Two (2013, Edgeworks Abbey)
- Brain Movies: The Original Teleplays of Harlan Ellison, Volume Three (2013, Edgeworks Abbey)
- Brain Movies: The Original Teleplays of Harlan Ellison, Volume Four (2013, Edgeworks Abbey)
- Brain Movies: The Original Teleplays of Harlan Ellison, Volume Five (2013, Edgeworks Abbey)

See also The Starlost #1: Phoenix without Ashes (1975), the novelization by Edward Bryant of the teleplay for the pilot episode of The Starlost, which includes a lengthy afterword by Ellison describing what happened during production of the series.

== Anthologies edited by ==
- Dangerous Visions (1967) (also issued as a three-volume paperback edition)
- Again, Dangerous Visions (1972) (also issued as a two-volume paperback edition)
- Medea: Harlan's World (1985)
- The Last Dangerous Visions (2024) (published posthumously)

== Collections edited by ==
- Nightshade and Damnations by Gerald Kersh (1968) (also introduction)
- Jacques Futrelle's "The Thinking Machine": The Enigmatic Problems of Prof. Augustus S. F. X. Van Dusen, PhD, LL. D., F. R. S., M. D., M. D. S. by Jacques Futrelle (2007 (also introduction)

== Selected short stories ==
- "A Boy and His Dog"
- "Adrift Just Off the Islets of Langerhans: Latitude 38° 54' N, Longitude 77° 00' 13" W"
- "The Beast That Shouted Love at the Heart of the World"
- "The Deathbird"
- "The Diagnosis of Dr. D'arqueAngel"
- "The Dragon on the Bookshelf"
- "From A to Z, in the Chocolate Alphabet"
- "From A to Z, in the Sarsaparilla Alphabet". F&SF. 100 (2): 5–30. Feb 2001.
- "Grail"
- "I Have No Mouth, and I Must Scream" – made into a CD-ROM PC video game I Have No Mouth, and I Must Scream in 1995.
- "Jeffty Is Five"
- "Knox"
- "The Prowler in the City at the Edge of the World"
- ""Repent, Harlequin!" Said the Ticktockman" – One of the most frequently reprinted stories in the English language and the second most frequently anthologized sf story
- "Shatterday" – adapted as an episode of the 1980s revival of The Twilight Zone
- "Shattered Like A Glass Goblin”
- "Soldier From Tomorrow" – adapted by Ellison in his script for the Outer Limits episode "Soldier". The film The Terminator had sufficient similarities to the story that later prints of the film acknowledge Ellison.
- "Try a Dull Knife"
- "The Whimper of Whipped Dogs"
- "How's the Night Life on Cissalda?"
- "Paladin of the Lost Hour"
- "The Man Who Rowed Christopher Columbus Ashore" – included in the Best American Short Stories anthology for 1993

== Comics adaptations of works by Ellisons ==
- Harlan Ellison's Dream Corridor, Vol. One, collecting the comic book series Dream Corridor, was published by Dark Horse Comics in 1996, artwork and adaptations by various artists and writers, and based on previously published short fiction by Ellison. Each issue had included one original short story.
- Harlan Ellison's Dream Corridor, Vol. Two was published by Dark Horse Comics in association with Edgeworks Abbey, Ellison's own imprint, in 2007. Artwork and adaptations by various artists and based on previous short fiction. This contained material not originally published in the original Dream Corridor series.
- Phoenix Without Ashes was published by IDW as a comic book.

=== Note ===
Stories originally contained in the Dream Corridor series, based on paintings by artists.

- "Midnight in the Sunken Cathedral" (Paintings by Stephen Hickman and Michael Whelan)
- "Pulling Hard Time" (Painting by Sam Raffa)
- "Anywhere But Here, With Anyone But You" (Painting by Leo and Diane Dillon)
- "Chatting with Anubis" (Painting by Jane McKenzie)
- "The Museum on Cyclops Avenue" (Painting by Ron Brown)

== Original graphic novels ==
- DC Science Fiction Graphic Novel #5, graphic novel by DC Comics, with illustrations and coloring by Marshall Rogers was published in September 1986 (based on Ellison's Demon with a Glass Hand Story)
- Harlan Ellison's 7 Against Chaos, hardcover graphic novel by DC Comics, with illustrations by Paul Chadwick and coloring by Ken Steacy was published in July 2013 (based on Ellison's original treatment for the first Star Trek motion picture)

== Other comics ==
In addition to the many adaptations of Ellison's work, as well as original stories for the graphic novel format, Ellison also wrote superhero comic book scripts for Marvel Comics and DC Comics, and several stories for various other publishers' comic book anthology series.

=== DC Comics ===
- Batman #237 (based on ideas by) (1971)
- Detective Comics #567 (1986)
- Batman: Gotham Knights #13 (Batman Black and White) (2001)
- DC Comics Presents: Justice League of America #1 (2004)
- Spirit #2 (Black and White back-up) (2010)
- Batman '66 the Lost Episode #1 (plotter) (2015)

=== EC Comics ===
- Weird Science-Fantasy #24 (plotter) (1954)

=== Marvel Comics ===
- The Avengers #88, #101 (plotter) (1971, 1972)
- The Incredible Hulk #140 (plotter) (1971)
- Daredevil #208-209 (1984)
- Heroes for Hope #1 (1985)

=== Moonstone Books ===
- The Phantom Chronicles #2 (prose story) (2010)

=== Warren ===
- Creepy #32 (1970)

== Video games ==
- I Have No Mouth, and I Must Scream

== Memoirs ==
On an edition of Public Radio International's arts and culture series Studio 360 broadcast on May 30, 2008, Ellison announced that he had signed with a "major publisher" to produce his memoirs, under the tentative title Working Without a Net. That title first appeared in the television show Babylon 5, for which Ellison was a creative consultant: in the episode "TKO" (originally broadcast in 1994), the fictional character Susan Ivanova is seen reading and laughing at a book entitled Working Without a Net by Harlan Ellison in 2258. Ultimately, Ellison chose author Nat Segaloff to write his biography and sat down for several hours of interviews, with the understanding that Ellison would have no veto over what would be in the book. That book, A Lit Fuse: The Provocative Life of Harlan Ellison, was published on July 14, 2017, by NESFA Press.

== Current publications ==
The print-on-demand publishers Edgeworks Abbey and Open Road publish works by Ellison.

I Have No Mouth & I Must Scream was included in American Fantastic Tales, volume II (from the 1940s to now), edited by Peter Straub and published by the Library of America in 2009. The Best American Mystery Stories of the Century edited by Tony Hillerman and Otto Penzler (Houghton Mifflin, 2000) included Ellison's "The Whimper of Whipped Dogs."

In October 2010, a special hardcover collection Unrepentant: A Celebration of the Writings of Harlan Ellison (Garcia Publishing Services, 2010) was issued by MadCon, a convention in Wisconsin at which Ellison was the guest of honor. In addition to including "How Interesting: A Tiny Man" (previously published in "Realms of Fantasy" magazine,) it also included "'Repent, Harlequin! Said the Ticktockman", "Some Frightening Films of the Forties" (a never before reprinted essay,) an illustrated bibliography of Ellison's fiction books by Tim Richmond, an article by Robert T. and Frank Garcia on Ellisons television work, an appreciation/essay by Dark Horse Comics publisher Michael Richardson, an article about Deep Shag's audio recordings of Ellison speaking engagements by Michael Reed, a 6-page B&W gallery of covers by Leo and Diane Dillon, a two-page Neil Gaiman-drawn cartoon and an official biography.

In March 2011, Subterranean Press released an expanded edition of Deathbird Stories featuring new introductory material, new afterwords and three additional stories (the never-before-collected "From A to Z, in the Sarsaparilla Alphabet", together with "Scartaris, June 28th", and "The Man Who Rowed Christopher Columbus Ashore").

In November 2011, Edgeworks Abbey (Ellison's personal publishing arm) and Spectrum Fantastic, published a pocket-sized gift book entitled Bugf#ck: The Useless Wit & Wisdom of Harlan Ellison. It contains quotes on writing, sex, politics, love and war, as well as pertinent excerpts from his short stories, and a handful of personal photographs of the author. In December 2011, Edgeworks Abbey began publishing original collections and retrospectives in two different series: the Brain Movies series (which contain teleplays from Ellison's award-winning career as a screenwriter) and the Harlan 101 series (which contain reprints, and original, unpublished stories and essays, and serve as an introduction to Ellison's writings). December 1, 2011 saw the simultaneous publication of four books: Brain Movies: Volume One, Brain Movies: Volume Two, Harlan 101: Encountering Ellison, and The Sound of a Scythe and Three Brilliant Novellas.

In May 2012, Kicks Books published Pulling a Train, the first of two reprints of early writings by Ellison, originally published in pulp magazines and in paperbacks for the crime fiction market. Simultaneously, the publisher of "Deep Shag" Records released "On the Road With Ellison, Volume Six".

In October 2012, Kicks Books published Getting in the Wind, the second half of a reissue of stories originally published as Sex Gang, under Ellison's Paul Merchant pseudonym in the 1950s.

In November 2012, Edgeworks Abbey published None of the Above, an unproduced screenplay adaptation (written for director Costa-Gavras) of Norman Spinrad's novel, Bug Jack Barron, and Rough Beasts, seventeen never-before-collected pulp stories from the 1950s.

In April 2013, Hardcase Crime – publishers of original and reprint paperback crime fiction – published a reprint of Web of the City.

In May 2013, Edgeworks Abbey published Brain Movies: Volume Three and Brain Movies: Volume Four, two further collections of Ellison's teleplays, including two unproduced pilots.

In July 2013, DC Comics published, in hardcover, Harlan Ellison's 7 Against Chaos, illustrated by Paul Chadwick.

In November 2013, Edgeworks Abbey and HarlanEllisonbooks.com published, Brain Movies: Volume Five, including a treatment for an unproduced episode of Batman, an unproduced, original teleplay, "The Dark Forces", and several others. Also published was Honorable Whoredom at a Penny A Word which is another collection – similar to Getting in the Wind, etc. – that collects Ellison's older, earlier fiction, written when he was learning his craft. This book collects stories written for men's magazines, "confessionals" and other digests of the pulp era, such as "The Golden Virgin", "Scum Town" and "They Killed My Kid!".

Edgeworks Abbey released four volumes in 2014: 8 in 80 by Ellison edited by Susan Ellison, Again, Honorable Whoredom at a Penny a Word, Brain Movies: Volume Six, and Harlan Ellison's Endlessly Watching.

In 2014, Subterranean Press published The Top of the Volcano: The Award-Winning Stories of Harlan Ellison, collecting twenty-three of Ellison's Nebula, Hugo, Bram Stoker, Edgar, Best American Short Story and Locus-Award-winning short fiction.

In December 2015, Subterranean Press published Can & Can'tankerous, containing previously uncollected short stories by Harlan Ellison.

== Voice acting ==
=== Audiobooks ===
- Harlan! Harlan Ellison Reads Harlan Ellison – released 1976, Alternate World Recordings
- Blood!: The Life and Future Times of Jack the Ripper – Alternate World Recordings, 1977
- On the Road with Ellison Volume 1 – released 1983, reissued 2001 on Deep Shag Records
- Twenty Thousand Leagues Under the Seas by Jules Verne – Dove Audio, 1996
- The Titanic Disaster Hearings: The Official Transcripts of the 1912 Senate Investigation by Tom Kuntz (Audio Literature, June 1998)
- Mars by Ben Bova, NewStar, 1999
- Return to Mars by Ben Bova, NewStar, 1999
- The Voice From the Edge, Vol.1: I Have No Mouth and I Must Scream – released 1999 on Fantastic Audio and Audible.com 2011
- A Wizard of Earthsea by Ursula K. Le Guin, Audio Adventures, 2001
- City of Darkness by Ben Bova, Fantastic Audio, 2001
- The Voice From the Edge, Vol.2: Midnight in the Sunken Cathedral – released 2001 on Fantastic Audio, and Audible.com 2011
- Demons by John Shirley – Recorded Books, 2002
- Ender's Game by Orson Scott Card – Audio Renaissance, 2004
- On the Road with Ellison Volume 2 – released 2004 on Deep Shag Records
- The Stonehenge Gate by Jack Williamson – Blackstone Audio, January 2006
- On the Road with Ellison Volume 3 – released 2007 on Deep Shag Records
- Through the Looking-Glass by Lewis Carroll – Blackstone Audio, November 2008
- The Voice From the Edge, Vol. 3: Pretty Maggie Moneyeyes – released 2009 on Blackstone Audio and Audible.com 2011
- More Than Human by Theodore Sturgeon – Blackstone Audio, 2010
- On the Road with Ellison Volume 4 – released 2010 on Deep Shag Records
- On the Road with Ellison Volume 5 – released 2011 on Deep Shag Records
- The Voice From the Edge, Vol. 4: The Deathbird & Other Stories – Audible.com 2011
- The Voice From the Edge, Vol. 5: Shatterday & Other Stories – Audible.com 2011
- On the Road with Ellison Volume 6 – released 2012 on Deep Shag Records
- Honeymoon in Hell by Fredric Brown – Blackstone Audio, March 2014
- Night Ride, and Other Journeys by Charles Beaumont – Blackstone Audio, April 2014
- Untouched by Human Hands by Robert Sheckley – Blackstone Audio, March 2015
- On the Road with Ellison Volume 7 – released 2018 on Deep Shag Records
- On the Road with Ellison Volume 8 – released 2024 on Deep Shag Records

=== Television ===
- Mother Goose and Grimm (1991–92)
- The Pirates of Dark Water (1992–1993)
- Phantom 2040, episode "A Boy and His Cat" (1994)
- Space Cases (1996–97)
- Babylon 5 (1996–1998)
- Scooby-Doo! Mystery Incorporated, episodes "The Shrieking Madness" (2010) and "Come Undone" (2013) (as himself)
- The Simpsons, episode "Married to the Blob" (2014) (as himself)

== Documentary ==
In 2007, Dreams with Sharp Teeth received its first public screening at the Writers Guild Theatre in Los Angeles. The documentary about Ellison and his work was written and directed by Erik Nelson with archival footage of Ellison. It was released on DVD by New Video Group on May 26, 2009. Ellison's last public appearance in his hometown was in September 2007 for the Midwestern debut of the documentary at Cleveland Public Library.
