= The Voice From the Edge =

Series of audiobooks collecting short stories by Harlan Ellison

The Voice From the Edge is a series of audiobooks collecting short stories written and narrated by American author Harlan Ellison. The first two volumes were published by Fantastic Audio; they were republished by Blackstone Audio in 2011. The uploading of these audio books to a newsgroup on the internet led to a court case to decide the liability of a service provider according to the Digital Millennium Copyright Act. The fourth volume was published by Audible.

Stories collected in these audio books include some of Ellison's best known works, from his earliest publications, from the 1950s, to his more recent, published in the early to late 2000s. Ellison as an audio actor/reader was nominated for a Grammy Award for Best Spoken Word Album for Children twice and has won several Audie Awards. Reviews of these collections praise Ellison's skilled narration.

== Volumes ==
=== The Voice From the Edge, Vol.1: I Have No Mouth and I Must Scream ===
Released in 1999. John DeNardo of Kirkus Reviews mentioned this album for "anyone who can read more than 10 books in a month" as a supplement to his list of "10 Sci-Fi and Fantasy Books For January 2012". Ellison won a Bram Stoker Award for this collection.

==== Track listing ====
1. Introduction to I Have No Mouth and I Must Scream
2. I Have No Mouth, and I Must Scream (1967) (Hugo Award winner)
3. "Repent, Harlequin!" Said the Ticktockman (1965) (Nebula award winner) (Hugo Award Winner)
4. The Lingering Scent of Woodsmoke (1996)
5. Laugh Track (1984)
6. The Time of the Eye (1959)
7. The Very Last Day of a Good Woman (1958)
8. Paladin of the Lost Hour (1985)
9. A Boy and His Dog (1969) (Nebula Award winner)
10. Grail (1981)

=== The Voice From the Edge, Vol.2: Midnight in the Sunken Cathedral ===
Released in 2001, it was reviewed by Kat Hooper of Fantasy Literature, who stated, "if there's anything that Harlan Ellison does better than write great stories, it's narrate them", although she warns that some of the stories, though thought-provoking, are unpleasant to hear. The stories were written between 1956 and 1995.

==== Track listing ====
1. In Lonely Lands (1958)
2. S.R.O. (1957)
3. Midnight in the Sunken Cathedral (1995)
4. The End of the Time of Leinard (1958)
5. Pennies, Off a Dead Man's Eyes (1969)
6. Rat Hater (1956)
7. Go Toward the Light (1994)
8. Soft Monkey (1987)
9. Jeffty is Five (1977) (Hugo Award and Nebula Award winner)
10. Prince Myshkin, and Hold the Relish (1982)
11. The Function of Dream Sleep (1988)
12. The Function of Dream Sleep, post script (2001)

=== The Voice From the Edge, Vol.3: Pretty Maggie Moneyeyes ===
Released in 2009, it was once again reviewed by Kat Hooper. She extols Ellison's storytelling skills, while warning that some of the stories are "gross". This volume was published by Audio Literature. Volume three is notable in that—apart from the new introductions or afterwords in each collection—it contains the first essay in these Ellison Audio book collections (Valerie: A True Memoir). It also contains a reading by another author, Robert Bloch, originally done for a vinyl record album released by the Harlan Ellison Record Collection, in the late 1970s. Bloch's story A Toy for Juliette, is included because the story on the next track is Ellison's continuation of the plot.

==== Track listing ====
1. Between Heaven and Hell (2004)
2. Pretty Maggie Moneyeyes (1967)
3. Maggie Afterword (2009)
4. Twilight In the Cupboard (2004)
5. Kiss of Fire (1972)
6. Fever (2004)
7. The Discarded (1959)
8. The Discarded Afterword (2009)
9. Darkness Falls On the River (2004)
10. Status Quo at Troyden's (1958)
11. Tired Old Man (1975)
12. Tired Old Man Afterword (2009)
13. The Silence (2004)
14. Valerie: A True Memoir (1972)
15. Valerie Afterword (2009)
16. Base (2004)
17. Base Afterword (2009)
18. Introduction to Bloch (2009)
19. A Toy For Juliet Read by Robert Bloch (1967)
20. The Prowler in the City at the Edge of the World (1967)

=== The Voice From the Edge, Vol.4: The Deathbird and Other Stories ===
Published by Audible in 2011, it includes four prize winning stories, and, as in the earlier volumes, Ellison reads his own work. The print version of this collection won a British Science Fiction Award for short fiction.

==== Track listing ====
1. Ellison Wonderland
2. The Deathbird (Hugo and Locus winner)
3. The Creation of Water
4. Run for the Stars
5. Croatoan
6. The Beast Who Shouted Love at the Heart of the World (Hugo winner)
7. The Slab
8. The Man Who Rowed Christopher Columbus Ashore
9. The Dreams a Nightmare Dreams
10. The Whimper of Whipped Dogs
11. Killing Bernstein
12. Count the Clock That Tells the Time (Locus winner)
13. How Interesting: A Tiny Man (Nebula winner)

=== The Voice From the Edge, Vol.5: Shatterday & Other Stories ===
Published by Audible in 2011. This is the final volume in the series. Most of the stories are from Ellison's most experimental period in the 1960s and 1970s.

==== Track listing ====
1. Delusion for a Dragon Slayer (Hugo nominee)
2. Shatterday (Nebula nominee)
3. Flop Sweat
4. In the Oligocenskie Gardens
5. Basilisk (Hugo & Locus winner; Nebula nominee)
6. Shattered Like a Glass Goblin (Nebula nominee)
7. Adrift Just Off the Islets of Langerhans: Latitude 38° 54' N, Longitude 77° 00' 13" W" (Hugo & Locus winner)
8. On the Downhill Side (Nebula nominee)
9. Susan
10. All the Lies That Are My Life (Hugo nominee)
11. Goodbye to All That (Nebula nominee)
