= Can & Can'tankerous =

2015 collection of short stories by Harlan Ellison

- Author: Harlan Ellison
- Language: English
- Genre: Speculative fiction
- Publisher: Subterranean Press
- Publication date: December 31, 2015
- Publication place: United States
- Media type: Print
- Pages: 236
- ISBN: 978-1-59606-751-6
- Preceded by: The Last Person To Marry A Duck Lived 300 Years Ago

Can & Can'tankerous is a 2015 collection of previously uncollected short stories written by Harlan Ellison. The collection includes the story "How Interesting: A Tiny Man", which won the 2011 Nebula Award for Best Short Story alongside "Ponies" by Kij Johnson. The collection was edited by Jason Davis and includes an introduction to the story "Loose Cannon" written by Neil Gaiman.

== Contents ==
- "How Interesting: A Tiny Man"

Originally published in Realms of Fantasy, February 2010 issue. Also reprinted in 2010 in Unrepentant: A Celebration of the Writings of Harlan Ellison, edited by Robert T. Garcia.

- "Never Send to Know for Whom the Lettuce Wilts"

First published in The Magazine of Fantasy & Science Fiction, January 2002 issue. A heavily revised, expanded and retitled version of an Ellison story originally published in 1956. It was also included in the 2001 reprint collection Troublemakers.

- "Objects of Desire in the Mirror are Closer than They Appear"

The Magazine of Fantasy & Science Fiction, October/November 1999. Later included in the 2001 revised and expanded edition of The Essential Ellison.

- "Harlan Ellison's Loose Cannon" (800-word introduction by Neil Gaiman)
- "Loose Cannon; or, Rubber Ducks from Space"

Amazing Stories, issue 603, 2004. A 200-word piece of flash fiction, written as part of the magazine's series of 1,000 words inspired by a painting.

- "From A to Z, in the Sarsaparilla Alphabet"

The Magazine of Fantasy & Science Fiction, February 2001. Later included in Deathbird Stories: Expanded Edition, released in 2011 by Subterranean Press.

- "Weariness"

Published in Shadow Show: All New Stories in Celebration of Ray Bradbury (2012).

- "The Toad Prince; or, Sex Queen of the Martian Pleasure-Domes"

Amazing Stories issue 600, 1999. A novelette that, according to the author's afterword, was originally written in the early 1990s. Reprinted the same year in Realms of Fantasy (August 2001).

- "Incognita, Inc."

Hemispheres, the Inflight Magazine of United Airlines, January 2001 issue. Also reprinted in 2001 in The Year's Best Fantasy and Horror: Fourteenth Annual Collection, edited by Ellen Datlow and Terri Windling and, in 2007, in Summer Chills, edited by Stephen Jones.

- "Goodbye to All That"

Appeared in McSweeney's Mammoth Treasury of Thrilling Tales, a 2002 anthology edited by Michael Chabon. Originally written in the mid-1990s for the Harlan Ellison's Dream Corridor comic series but not included at the time due to a publication hiatus, it was finally incorporated into the series in March 2007 as part of Harlan Ellison's Dream Corridor: Volume Two.

- "He Who Grew Up Reading Sherlock Holmes"

Published in Subterranean Magazine, The Final Issue, August 2014, online.
