= Mind Fields =

Book by Harlan Ellison

- Attack at Dawn appears on the cover.
- Author: Harlan Ellison
- Illustrator: Jacek Yerka
- Cover artist: Jacek Yerka
- Language: English
- Genre: Short stories
- Publisher: Morpheus International
- Publication date: 1994
- Publication place: United States
- Media type: Print (hardcover)
- Pages: 71 pp
- ISBN: 1-883398-03-7
- OCLC: 30117410
- Dewey Decimal: 759.13 20
- LC Class: ND955.P63 Y472 1994

Mind Fields is a book featuring paintings by Polish painter Jacek Yerka combined with short stories and prose poems by American writer Harlan Ellison. The 34 paintings by Yerka were created first. Ellison then wrote a short story based on a single painting. The exception was "Under the Landscape" which was based on two separate paintings.

== Contents ==
1. The Creation of Water
2. Twilight in the Cupboard
3. Amok Harvest
4. Theory of Tension
5. Back to Nature
6. Internal Inspection
7. Metropolis II
8. In the Oligocenskie Gardens
9. Europe
10. Fever
11. Attack at Dawn
12. Susan
13. Between Heaven and Hell
14. Shed of Rebellion
15. To Each His Own
16. Eruption
17. The Inquisition
18. Beneath the Dunes
19. The Silence
20. Darkness Falls on the River
21. Paradise
22. Express Delivery
23. The Agitators
24. Truancy at the Pond
25. Ammonite
26. Base
27. Foraging in the Field
28. Traffic Prohibited
29. Afternoon with the Bros. Grimm
30. The Cosmic Barnyard
31. Under the Landscape (two paintings)
32. Ellison Wonderland
33. Please Don't Slam the Door

== Paintings ==
The paintings in Mind Fields are typical of Yerka's style. According to Yerka, many of the paintings, including "Between Heaven and Hell" and "Attack at Dawn", draw on his childhood memories from the 1950s as their primary inspiration. Other paintings, such as "Amok Harvest" and "Express Delivery", draw on his experiences traveling through the Polish countryside.

Yerka was responsible for the title of all but two of the story-paintings, which were named by Ellison. The first of these, "Susan", was named after Ellison's wife. Ellison also named the painting "Ellison Wonderland" after one of his short story collections and his home in California because he "was hoping that they would give [him] that painting." The painting was later given to Ellison as a gift shortly after the book was published during an interview with Tom Snyder on The Late Late Show.

== Stories ==
Ellison became involved with Yerka's paintings when he was asked to write an introduction to the Mind Fields collection. According to Ellison, he found the paintings so inspiring that he told his publishers that he wanted to write a story for each one. While Ellison generally based the narrative of each story on some aspect of the painting, this was not always the case. In "Attack at Dawn" for instance, the story has little to do with the physical objects represented in Yerka's painting. Instead, Ellison chose to base the story on the painting's prominent themes of transformation and attack.

Ellison also wrote many of the stories to reflect subjects and themes that commonly occur in his work. "Twilight in the Cupboard" and "The Silence" both prominently feature the themes of Jewish assimilation and the Holocaust. The former was inspired in part by Ather D. Morse's 1967 book While Six Million Died. "Eruption" and "Ammonite" embody the lost city/Atlantis theme present in much of Ellison's work. "Metropolis II" also incorporates themes from many of Ellison's other stories. In particular, it mixes autobiographical details with fiction in a manner similar to "All the Lies that are My Life" and other stories.

Although Ellison did not follow his usual custom of writing an introduction to the book, he did provide commentary on 17 of the stories in the form of endnotes. These notes describe the background to some of the stories, and point out important themes. Yerka's son Philip died during the creation of the book, and Ellison dedicated the final story "Please Don't Slam the Door" to his memory in one of the notes.
