= Paingod and Other Delusions =

Short story collection by Harlan Ellison

- First edition cover
- Author: Harlan Ellison
- Cover artist: Jack Gaughan
- Language: English
- Genre: Science fiction
- Publisher: Pyramid Books
- Publication date: 1965
- Publication place: United States
- Media type: Print (paperback)
- Pages: 178
- ISBN: 0-515-03646-3
- OCLC: 4317819

Paingod and Other Delusions is a collection of short stories by American writer Harlan Ellison. It was originally published in paperback in 1965 by Pyramid Books. Pyramid reissued the collection four times over the next fifteen years, with a new introduction added for a uniform edition of Ellison books in 1975. Ace Books issued an edition in 1983. The collection's only hardcover edition is The Fantasies of Harlan Ellison, which compiles it together with Ellison's "I Have No Mouth and I Must Scream".

The general theme that runs through each of these stories is the rejection of the establishment and the fight of the individual against a corrupt authority. "Repent, Harlequin!" Said the Ticktockman", winner of the 1966 Hugo Award, the 1965 Nebula Award and the 2015 Prometheus Hall of Fame Award, as well as being one of the most reprinted stories in the English language, "Wanted In Surgery", and "The Crackpots" are particularly famous examples of this theme in Ellison's work.

== Contents ==
- Introduction (1965): "Spero Meliora: From the Vicinity of Alienation"
- New Introduction (1975 and later editions): "Your Basic Crown of Thorns"
- "Paingod"
- ""Repent, Harlequin!" Said the Ticktockman"
- "The Crackpots"
- "Sleeping Dogs"
- "Bright Eyes"
- "The Discarded"
- "Wanted In Surgery"
- "Deeper Than the Darkness"

== Reception ==
Spider Robinson, reviewing the 1975 reissue, noted that the stories came from an early stage of Ellison's career, describing the concepts as "striking and brilliant" but finding that "the craft, the execution of those ideas, might best be described as impulsive".
