= The Deadly Streets =

1958 short story collection by Harlan Ellison

- First US edition
- Author: Harlan Ellison
- Language: English
- Genre: short stories
- Publisher: Ace Books
- Publication date: 1983
- Publication place: United States
- Media type: Print (paperback)
- Pages: 192

The Deadly Streets is a collection of short stories published by author Harlan Ellison in 1958.

The stories explore the violent themes Ellison experienced as part of the street gang The Barons when he was researching Web of the City.

== Contents ==
The table of contents for Ace's 1983 edition are as follows:

- New Introduction(1983): Avoiding Dark Places
- Introduction to First Edition(1958): Some Sketches of the Damned
- Rat Hater
- "I'll Bet You a Death"
- We Take Care of Our Dead
- The Man With the Golden Tongue
- Johnny Slice's Stoolie
- Joy Ride
- Buy Me That Blade
- The Hippie-Slayer
- Kid Killer
- With a Knife in Her Hand
- Sob Story (written with Henry Slesar)
- Look Me in the Eye, Boy!
- The Dead Shot
- Ship-Shape Pay-Off (written with Robert Silverberg)
- Made in Heaven
- Students of the Assassin
