= Alone Against Tomorrow =

Alone Against Tomorrow: Stories of Alienation in Speculative Fiction
- First edition
- Author: Harlan Ellison
- Cover artist: Brad Johannsen
- Language: English
- Genre: Science fiction
- Publisher: Macmillan Publishers
- Publication date: 1971
- Publication place: United States
- Media type: Print (hardcover)
- Pages: 277

Alone Against Tomorrow: Stories of Alienation in Speculative Fiction is a collection of short stories by American writer Harlan Ellison. Published in the United States in 1971, it as a ten-year retrospective of Ellison's short stories. It was later published in the United Kingdom in two volumes as All the Sounds of Fear in 1973 and The Time of the Eye in 1974 (the 1974 volume only containing a new introduction). All of the stories in this collection center around isolation and alienation, and were selected from previous short story collections to fit this theme.

The book was dedicated to, among others, four student protesters who were killed in the Kent State shootings of 1970. This dedication prompted a response from a reader calling the students "hooligans" who were "Communist-led radical revolutionaries and anarchists, and deserved to be shot". This letter was reprinted in the introduction to Ellison's subsequent 1974 short story collection Approaching Oblivion. Ellison states that this letter frightened him and was one of the things that led him to change that collection from a call to action to a cry of frustration and disillusionment.

== Contents ==
- "I Have No Mouth, and I Must Scream"
- "The Discarded"
- "Deeper Than the Darkness"
- "Blind Lightning"
- "All the Sounds of Fear"
- "The Silver Corridor"
- ""Repent, Harlequin!" Said the Ticktockman"
- "Bright Eyes"
- "Are You Listening?"
- "Try a Dull Knife"
- "In Lonely Lands"
- "Eyes of Dust"
- "Nothing for My Noon Meal"
- "O Ye of Little Faith"
- "The Time of the Eye"
- "Life Hutch"
- "The Very Last Day of a Good Woman"
- "Night Vigil"
- "Lonelyache"
- "Pennies, Off a Dead Man's Eyes"
