= Gentleman Junkie and Other Stories of the Hung-Up Generation =

1961 collection of short stories by Harlan Ellison

- First edition
- Author: Harlan Ellison
- Cover artist: Leo Dillon
- Language: English
- Genre: Crime • mystery
- Publisher: Regency Books
- Publication date: 1961
- Publication place: United States
- Media type: Print (paperback)
- Pages: 160
- OCLC: 3812102
- LC Class: CPB Box no. 2516 vol. 2

Gentleman Junkie and Other Stories of the Hung-Up Generation is an early collection of short stories by Harlan Ellison, originally published in paperback in 1961. Most of the stories were written while Ellison was a draftee in the United States army between 1957 and 1959. These were sold to Rogue Magazine, a pulp fiction magazine of the era. Other stories in the collection had appeared previously in publications ranging from Alfred Hitchcock's Mystery Magazine to a Chicago weekly newspaper.

Gentleman Junkie... is different from many of Ellison's subsequent short story collections in that none of the stories are in the speculative fiction genre. The stories provide social commentary on racial discrimination, bigotry, and other forms of injustice prevalent in United States during the 1950s. In particular, 'Daniel White for the Greater Good' and 'The Night of Delicate Terrors' depict the plight of African Americans prior to the Civil Rights Act of 1964. Other stories also deal with oppression and injustice. 'Free With This Box' is based on an occurrence in Ellison's childhood and describes abuse of power by police.

Dorothy Parker famously gave it a good review, saying Ellison was "a good, honest, clean writer, putting down what he has seen and known, and no sensationalism about it." Ellison has since stated that the positive review from such a prominent literary figure changed his life and gave him a sense of validation as an author.

== Contents ==
- Foreword (by Frank M. Robinson)
- Introduction: The Children of Nights (1961 edition)
  - New Introduction: The Children of Nights (1975 edition)
- Final Shtick
- Gentleman Junkie
- May We Also Speak? Four Statements from the Hung-Up Generation:
  1. Now You're on the Box!
  2. The Rocks of Gogroth
  3. Payment Returned, Unopened
  4. The Truith
- Daniel White for the Greater Good
- Lady Bug, Lady Bug
- Free With This Box!
- There's One on Every Campus
- At the Mountains of Blindness
- This is Jackie Spinning
- No Game for Children
- The Late, Great Arnie Draper
- High Dice
- Enter the Fanatic, Stage Center
- Someone is Hungrier
- Memory of a Muted Trumpe
- The Time of the Eye (1961 edition)
- Turnpike (1975 edition)
- Sally in Our Alley
- The Silence of Infidelity
- Have Coolth
- RFD #2 (with H. Slesar)
- No Fourth Commandment
- The Night of Delicate Terrors

== External Reviews ==
- http://www.islets.net/collections/gentleman.html
