= The Man with Nine Lives =

The Man with Nine Lives may refer to:

- The Man with Nine Lives (film), a 1940 film with Boris Karloff
- "The Man with Nine Lives" (Battlestar Galactica), an episode of the original Battlestar Galactica TV series guest-starring Fred Astaire
- The Man with Nine Lives, a novel by Harlan Ellison
- The Man with Nine Lives, an episode of Mona the Vampire
