= The Harlan Ellison Hornbook =

1990 compilation by Harlan Ellison

- First trade edition (publ. Penzler)
- Author: Harlan Ellison
- Language: English
- Subject: essays
- Publisher: Mirage Press (signed, numbered), Warner Books Inc.
- Publication date: 1990
- Publication place: United States
- Media type: Print (Hardcover)
- Pages: 417 pp
- ISBN: 978-0-89296-239-6

The Harlan Ellison Hornbook is a 1990 compilation of columns written by Harlan Ellison for several counterculture newspapers in Los Angeles, mostly for the Los Angeles Free Press and the L.A. Weekly News in 1972 and 1973.

Many of the essays are of an autobiographical nature as Ellison writes about particularly colorful moments from his past, including a love affair gone bad with a woman who he identifies only as "Valerie," an infamous diatribe about his hatred of Christmas entitled, "No Offense Intended, But Fuck Xmas!", a tribute to his departed dog Ahbhu, and a chilling account of his journey to San Quentin State Prison to visit a man on death row.

Also included is an article about Lenny Bruce that originally appeared in Los Angeles magazine, a tribute to the comic wit of illustrator George L. Carlson, and an essay defending comic books as a legitimate art form entitled, "Did Your Mother Throw Yours Out?" that originally appeared in Playboy magazine.

Mirage Press simultaneously published the Hornbook in a signed and numbered slipcased edition in 1990, along with the separate companion volume of the screenplay for Harlan Ellison's Movie. Both were reprinted again in Edgeworks 3, published by White Wolf Publishing in 1997.
