= Love Ain't Nothing But Sex Misspelled =

- First edition
- Author: Harlan Ellison
- Cover artist: Leo and Diane Dillon
- Language: English
- Genre: Short stories
- Publisher: Trident Press; Ace Books
- Publication date: 1968
- Publication place: United States
- Pages: 382
- OCLC: 10297

Love Ain't Nothing But Sex Misspelled is a collection of short stories by American writer Harlan Ellison.

It was originally published in hardback in 1968. Ace Books issued an edition in 1983. This edition modified the table of contents by shuffling the order of the material, and replacing nine stories from the 1968 edition with three additional ones. Ellison removed those nine stories from the reissue because they were available in other collections and he had grown sensitive to such overlap.

The book was reissued again in 1997 by White Wolf Publishing as part of their Edgeworks series of Ellison reprints. Once again modifying the table of contents, it contains a further changed order and additional swapping of stories: one of the 1983 additions was retained, an additional two from the 1968 edition were removed, and two new stories were added.

== Contents (from the 1968 edition) ==
- "Ernest and the Machine God"
- "All the Sounds of Fear"
- "Battle Without Banners"
- "Delusion for a Dragon Slayer"
- "Lonelyache"
- "O Ye of Little Faith"
- "Pretty Maggie Moneyeyes"
- "Punky & the Yale Men"
- "The Resurgence of Miss Ankle-Strap Wedgie"
- "Final Shtick"
- "Daniel White for the Greater Good"
- "Neither Your Jenny nor Mine"
- "The Night of Delicate Terrors"
- "A Prayer for No One's Enemy"
- "A Path Through the Darkness"
- "Mona at Her Windows"
- "What I Did on My Vacation This Summer by Little Bobby Hirschhorn, Age 27"
- "Blind Bird, Blind Bird, Go Away from Me!"
- "Riding the Dark Train Out"
- "G. B. K. - A Many-Flavored Bird"
- "The Universe of Robert Blake"
- "The Face of Helene Bournouw"
- "Motherhood, Apple Pie and the American Way"

== Contents (from the 1983 edition) ==
- Introduction
- "Neither Your Jenny Nor Mine"
- "The Universe of Robert Blake"
- "G.B.K. - A Many Flavored Bird"
- "Riding The Dark Train Out"
- "Valerie"
- "The Resurgence of Miss Ankle-strap Wedgie"
- "Daniel White For The Greater Good"
- "Blind Bird, Blind Bird, Go Away From Me!"
- "What I Did On My Vacation This Summer, By Little Bobby Hirchhorn, Age 27"
- "Mona At Her Windows"
- "When I Was A Hired Gun"
- "A Path Through The Darkness"
- "Battle Without Banners"
- "A Prayer for No One's Enemy"
- "Punky & The Yale Men"
- "I Curse The Lesson and Bless The Knowledge"

== Contents (from Edgeworks 3) ==
- Introduction
- "The Resurgence of Miss Ankle-Strap Wedgie"
- "The Universe of Robert Blake"
- "G. B. K. - A Many-Flavored Bird"
- "Neither Your Jenny nor Mine"
- "Riding the Dark Train Out"
- "Moonlighting"
- "What I Did on My Vacation This Summer by Little Bobby Hirschhorn, Age (1964)"
- "Mona at Her Windows"
- "Blind Bird, Blind Bird, Go Away from Me!"
- "Passport"
- "I Curse the Lesson and Bless the Knowledge"
- "Battle Without Banners"
- "A Path Through the Darkness"
- "A Prayer for No One's Enemy"
- "Punky & the Yale Men"
