= The Discarded =

- Short story by Harlan Ellison
- Country: United States
- Language: English
- Genres: Science fiction, tragedy

Publication
- Published in: Fantastic
- Publication type: Magazine
- Publication date: April 1959

"The Discarded" is a science fiction short story by American writer Harlan Ellison. It was first published in the April 1959 issue of Fantastic and was later included in the 1965 short story collection Paingod and Other Delusions and the third volume of the audiobook collection The Voice From The Edge.

It has been adapted into comic and television format, the latter of which was an episode of the American series Masters of Science Fiction. Prior to his death, Ellison announced that he was working on a novel adaptation based on the teleplay and original short story.

== Synopsis ==
The story follows a group of humans sent to live on a space station. They believe that they were rejected by humanity for their mutations, as it was feared that allowing them to continue living on Earth would cause the mutations to spread and multiply. After a generation has passed, the station occupants notice that a ship from Earth is en-route to intersect with them. From the ship's crew they learned that the banishment was not effective, as the mutations only stopped for a brief period and then began to grow more severe. The earthlings need the blood of the discarded humans, as it's believed that their blood contains an enzyme that can prevent future mutations. The discarded humans are reluctant but ultimately agree to participate, as they are made to believe that they will be allowed to return to their original homes. Celebration breaks out on the station, but it is short lived as they discover that they were betrayed when a ship arrives with more mutants that have been exiled from Earth.

== Release ==
"The Discarded" was first published in the April 1959 issue of Fantastic magazine. It was later reprinted in the short story collection Paingod and Other Delusions, published in 1965 and reissued ten years later. The story, which has also gone by the title "The Abnormals", has been republished in other short story collections and has been translated into French and Italian.

An audiobook adaptation of "The Discarded" was included in the 2009 third volume of the short story collection The Voice From The Edge, which was narrated by Ellison. It was accompanied by The Discarded Afterword, published in 2009.

== Adaptations ==
=== Comics ===
"The Discarded" was one of several stories adapted into a comic format for the 1978 comic story collection The Illustrated Harlan Ellison. The story's pencils, inks, and colors were by Michael Whelan, while Alex Jay performed the lettering.

Of the adaptation, Ellison noted that he was not upset that the story, along with several of his others, were shortened to fit the collection as "I can’t get very upset because they were edited down. If they are diminished I suspect they were diminishable. They were capable of being diminished." He further noted that he did not see the adaptations as inferior as they would serve as a good introduction to his work for those unfamiliar.

The story was given a second adaptation for the second volume of Harlan Ellison's Dream Corridor, which was published in 2007 through Dark Horse Comics. Steve Rude served as the story's penciller and inker.

=== Novel ===
In a 2010 interview with Wired's Sarah Bernhardt, Ellison mentioned that he was working on a novel version of "The Discarded" that would draw upon both the original short story and the Masters of Science Fiction teleplay. He reported that he had worked on the novel from May until August 2010 and that it would be his last book.

=== Television ===
"The Discarded" has been adapted into an episode of the television series Masters of Science Fiction, which was broadcast in the US on August 25, 2007. Presented by Stephen Hawking and developed into a screenplay by Ellison and Josh Olson, the episode was directed by Jonathan Frakes and starred John Hurt and Brian Dennehy.

In a featured review for the episode SF Site noted that the acting was better than in prior episodes and praised the special effects while stating that "it is the ideas examined in "The Discarded" which really provide the show with its power." The Sun Sentinel also had praise, calling it "the most poignant, the most gracefully written and the most fully fleshed-out of the four installments". Ellison has voiced his approval of the episode, but that it "will probably be the last thing I'll write for television."

== Reception ==
The Houston Press's Jef Rouner included "The Discarded" on their list of Ellison's top ten best short stories.

== See also ==
- List of sources for anthology series
