= Edgeworks 1 =

Edgeworks 1 is a 1996 novel written by Harlan Ellison.

== Plot summary ==
Edgeworks 1 is a novel in which a limited anthology of writings showcases the prolific author’s expansive career—from magazine columns to his television work, including the Star Trek episode "The City on the Edge of Forever." Anchored by the novel Over the Edge, this 500-plus-page hardback collects essays, and the material offers a raw and revealing look at Ellison's outspoken persona and creative convictions.

== Reception ==
Paul Pettengale reviewed Edgeworks 1 for Arcane magazine, rating it a 6 out of 10 overall, and stated that "it is pretty interesting to get a glimpse inside the mind of a man so many of us have had (for the most part) anonymous experience of. Ellison is an interesting guy, it's just that he really wants you to know the fact. Yes, this is a worthy collection of works, but I wonder if anyone will actually read all of it cover to cover. It's a bit like Hunter Thomson's Great Shark Hunt - it's good to dip іп and out of, but reading it as a whole is a herculean task."

== Reviews ==
- Review by Darrell Schweitzer (1996) in Aboriginal Science Fiction, Summer 1996
- Review by Don D'Ammassa (1996) in Science Fiction Chronicle, #190 October 1996
- Review by Lucas Gregor (1997) in Absolute Magnitude, Spring 1997
