= No Doors, No Windows =

First edition (publ. Pyramid Books) Cover art by Leo and Diane Dillon.

No Doors, No Windows is a 1975 short story collection by American author Harlan Ellison. It contains mostly suspense and crime tales along with a lengthy introduction by Ellison.

== Contents ==
- Introduction: "Blood/Thoughts"
- "The Whimper of Whipped Dogs"
- "Eddie, You're My Friend"
- "Status Quo at Troyden's"
- "Nedra at f:5.6"
- "Opposites Attract"
- "Toe the Line"
- "Down in the Dark"
- "Pride in the Profession"
- "The Children's Hour"
- "White Trash Don't Exist"
- "Thicker Than Blood"
- "Two Inches in Tomorrow's Column"
- "Promises of Laughter"
- "Ormond Always Pays His Bills"
- "The Man on the Juice Wagon"
- "Tired Old Man"
