= Spider Kiss =

Novel by Harlan Ellison

- First edition (original title)
- Author: Harlan Ellison
- Original title: Rockabilly
- Language: English
- Genre: Fiction
- Publisher: Gold Medal Books
- Publication date: 1961
- Publication place: United States
- Media type: Print (Paperback)
- Pages: 176
- ISBN: 9781497604292
- OCLC: 6953790

Spider Kiss (originally titled Rockabilly) is a 1961 novel by American author Harlan Ellison.

A 2007 re-release of the novel printed on the back cover that Spider Kiss had the distinction of being the only novel enshrined in the Rock and Roll Hall of Fame.

== Plot ==
A seemingly shy and humble country boy named Luther Sellers is discovered to have a magnificent voice and mesmerizing stage presence. He is given the stage name Stag Preston and after a short time on the "Chittlin' Circuit" becomes a major rockabilly music star under the tutelage of a manager who seems to be patterned after Elvis Presley's manager, "Colonel" Tom Parker. Over time Luther's success goes to his head and his "Aw, shucks..." demeanor simply becomes a gimmick used to keep his fans, whom he secretly despises, believing that he hasn't really left his country roots and humble upbringing.

In reality Stag lives up to his stage name, using his fame and seductive powers to lure any woman he can into his bed, leaving broken hearts and scandals everywhere he goes. The latter are all tidied up by his money-grubbing manager, who doesn't want anything to taint his cash cow. Meanwhile, Stag's growing megalomania eventually has him treating everyone around him like dirt and becoming harder and harder to work with. Eventually he is entangled in a scandal that takes all their power to cover up, and sets into motion the events leading to Stag's downfall.

== 1982 assault ==
In 1982, Ellison assaulted the publisher and CEO of Grosset & Dunlap after Spider Kiss was reprinted and mistakenly labeled as science fiction, Ellison knew this would mislead readers. Prior to the assault there was an angry exchange about the incident through the mail. Ellison later said the publisher, "Didn't know me from a pissoir."

After the assault and before anyone could call the police, Ellison's editor got him out of the building in a freight elevator. Ellison then got a taxi and 15 minutes later arrived at a television studio to videotape an episode of the Alpha Repertory Television Service talk show Nightcap hosted by Studs Terkel and Calvin Trillin, along with Ellison other panelists included science fiction writers Gene Wolfe and Isaac Asimov.

Ellison was never arrested for the assault.

== Critical reception ==
Comics Buyer's Guide, "I thought it was a good book the first two times I read it. I think it's a great book today."

Green Man Review, "I think that's what makes this book important -- it represents an era of rock that's gone for good now (though not necessarily a better one -- prefabricated music is still prefabricated)."
