= The Beast That Shouted Love at the Heart of the World =

1969 short story collection by Harlan Ellison

- First edition
- Author: Harlan Ellison
- Cover artist: Leo and Diane Dillon
- Language: English
- Genre: Speculative fiction
- Published: 1969
- Publisher: Avon
- Publication place: United States
- Media type: Print (paperback)
- Pages: 254
- OCLC: 16989821

The Beast That Shouted Love at the Heart of the World is a short story collection by American writer Harlan Ellison, published in 1969. It contains one of the author's most famous stories, "A Boy and His Dog", adapted into a film of the same name. "The Beast That Shouted Love at the Heart of the World" won the 1969 Hugo Award for Best Short Story, while "A Boy and His Dog" was first published in New Worlds was nominated for a Hugo Award for Best Novella and won the 1969 Nebula Award for Best Novella.

== Contents ==
- "Introduction: The Waves in Rio"
- "The Beast That Shouted Love at the Heart of the World"
- "Along the Scenic Route"
- "Phoenix"
- "Asleep: With Still Hands"
- "Santa Claus vs. S.P.I.D.E.R."
- "Try a Dull Knife"
- "The Pitll Pawob Division"
- "The Place With No Name"
- "White on White"
- "Run for the Stars"
- "Are You Listening?"
- "S.R.O."
- "Worlds to Kill"
- "Shattered Like a Glass Goblin"
- "A Boy and His Dog"

== In popular culture ==
- "The Beast that Shouted 'I' at the Heart of the World", a pun on the book’s title, is the Japanese title for the last episode of the Neon Genesis Evangelion anime series. The word アイ ("ai") can be read as the Japanese word ai (love) but is also the typical transcription of English "I," leaving the reading ambiguous.
