= Ellison Wonderland =

Book by Harlan Ellison

- First edition
- Author: Harlan Ellison
- Cover artist: Victor Kalin
- Language: English
- Genre: Science fiction
- Publisher: Paperback Library
- Publication date: 1962
- Publication place: United States
- Media type: Print (paperback)
- Pages: 191
- OCLC: 8228843

Ellison Wonderland is a collection of short stories by author Harlan Ellison that was originally published in 1962. Gerry Gross bought the book from Ellison in 1961, providing him with the funds he needed to move to Los Angeles. Subsequent payments after the book was published supplied the author with enough money to survive until he was able to find a job writing for a television series. It was later reprinted in 1974 by New American Library with an introduction by Ellison.

The stories are in the genre of speculative fiction, and concentrate on the themes of loneliness, the end of the world, and the flaws of humanity. Ellison wrote a short introduction to each story, a tradition that he would repeat in many of his later short story collections. Many of the stories in this collection, such as "All the Sounds of Fear", "The Very Last Day of a Good Woman" and "In Lonely Lands", would turn up in later anthologies of Ellison's short stories.

== Contents ==
- Introduction: The Man on the Mushroom
- Commuter's Problem
- Do-it-yourself
- The Silver Corridor
- All the Sounds of Fear
- Gnomebody
- The Sky is Burning
- Mealtime
- The Very Last Day of a Good Woman
- Battlefield
- Deal from the Bottom
- The Wind Beyond the Mountains
- Back to the Drawing Boards
- Nothing for My Noon Meal
- Hadj
- Rain, Rain, Go Away
- In Lonely Lands
