= Stalking the Nightmare =

Book by Harlan Ellison

- First edition
- Author: Harlan Ellison
- Cover artist: Jane Mackenzie
- Language: English
- Genre: Science fiction, postmodernism
- Publisher: Phantasia Press
- Publication date: 1982
- Publication place: United States
- Media type: Print (hardcover)
- Pages: 332
- ISBN: 0-932096-16-6
- OCLC: 8825918
- Dewey Decimal: 813/.54 19
- LC Class: PS3555.L62 S7 1982

Stalking the Nightmare is a 1982 collection of short stories and nonfiction pieces by American writer Harlan Ellison. The short stories are interspersed with "Scenes from the Real World" sections, which are essays on a variety of topics. Although most of the stories had not previously appeared in any of Ellison's books, four of them were taken from his out of print 1970 collection Over the Edge.

The story "Djinn, No Chaser" was later adapted by Haskell Barkin into an episode of the 1980s television series Tales from the Darkside with the same title.

== Contents ==
- Foreword by Stephen King
- "Introduction: Quiet Lies the Locust Tells"
- "Grail"
- "The Outpost Undiscovered By Tourists"
- "Blank..."
- Scenes From the Real World: I - The 3 Most Important Things In Life
- "Visionary" (written with Joe L. Hensley)
- "Djinn, No Chaser"
- "Invasion Footnote"
- Scenes From the Real World: II - Saturn, November 11
- "Night of Black Glass"
- "Final Trophy"
- "!!!The!!Teddy!Crazy!!Show!!!"
- "The Cheese Stands Alone"
- Scenes From The Real World: III - "Somehow, I Don't Think We're In Kansas, Toto"
- "Transcending Destiny"
- "The Hour That Stretches"
- "The Day I Died"
- 3 Tales From the Mountains of Madness: "Tracking Level", "Tiny Ally", "The Goddess in the Ice"
- Scenes From The Real World: IV - Gopher In the Gilly
