= Memos from Purgatory =

1961 book by Harlan Ellison

- First edition
- Author: Harlan Ellison
- Cover artist: Leo and Diane Dillon
- Language: English
- Subject: Street gangs, prison
- Publisher: Regency
- Publication date: 1961
- Publication place: United States
- Media type: Print (paperback)
- Pages: 160

Memos from Purgatory is Harlan Ellison's account of his experience with juvenile gangs when he joined one to research them for his first novel, Web of the City. It also describes the author's experience during an overnight stay in jail.

== Contents ==
- New Introduction: Memo '83 (1983 edition)
- New Introduction: Memo '75 (1975 edition)
- Memo '69 (1969 and 1975 editions)
- A Message from the Sponsor
- Prologue
- Book One: The Gang
  - Nine chapters
- Transition
- Book Two: The Tombs
  - Seven chapters
- Conclusion

== Summary ==
The book is divided into two main sections, separated by a shorter transition.

"Book One: The Gang" is devoted to Ellison's ten weeks as a member of a street gang he calls The Barons, in the Red Hook neighborhood of Brooklyn, New York considered one of the most dangerous areas of the city in 1954. His goal was to research what became his first novel, Web of the City. Thus Ellison was in regular contact with his literary agent during his time in the Barons.

He rents a run-down apartment, and practices quick draw knife tricks. Under an assumed name, he begins spending time at a soda fountain frequented by the gang members. Impressing them with his tough demeanor and refusal to back down when intimidated, the gang members eventually invite him to join. He is initiated in several phases. First, by stripping to the waist and running the gauntlet where gang members flip their sharpened belt buckles at him like whips. Second, by engaging in sexual intercourse with a female gang member. He is expected to take part in a "rumble" or mass fight with another gang, but this requirement is suspended pending such an occasion. Furthermore, he must disavow any Jewish or African ancestry, or association with communism (Ellison is in fact Jewish). Ellison devotes space to an analysis of the lifestyle and habits of the Barons. Between 16 and 20 years old, they come from broken homes and are inarticulate high school drop outs with little sense of the future. The girls are viewed as property, expected to allow their current sexual partner to burn or cut his initials into her skin. The highest accomplishment for a Baron is to join the Merchant Marines when he turns 21. Deaths are uncommon, but violence is routine with stabbings, beatings and other injuries. Nonetheless, Ellison begins to feel kinship with most of his gang associates, and affection for his unorthodox girlfriend. He is eventually promoted to the position of war counselor for the gang.

Ellison writes about a knife fight with a Baron who held a grudge against him, in which he sustains bad cuts. He leaves the gang after a rumble with the Puerto Rican Flyers gang in Prospect Park, where he is injured again and witnesses brutal behavior on all sides.

"Transition" summarizes the next several years in Ellison's life. In addition to a stint in the Army and a divorce from his wife, he writes and lectures extensively on youth gangs. He kept several weapons from his time in the gang (a .22 revolver, a switchblade knife, and a set of brass knuckles), which he used in his lectures.

"Book Two: The Tombs" is expanded from an essay "Buried in the Tombs" for The Village Voice and describes Ellison's experience in The Tombs, as New York City's jail was nicknamed. Two detectives visit his apartment in 1960, investigating a complaint that he is a narcotics user and has illegal weapons. (Ellison blames this complaint on a former friend who borrowed a portable typewriter and called the police in retaliation when Ellison demanded the typewriter's return). The officers quickly accept that the staunchly anti-drug Ellison is not an addict ("I didn't even use No-Doz") but say that his weapons collection is another matter, and arrest him for violation of the Sullivan Act against concealed weapons. He describes the detectives as professional and polite, but rigidly bound by duty and bureaucracy. After his arrest he experiences what he describes as a series of indignities, such as being chained to a blood-spattered man who attacked a young woman with a hammer. He encounters a man called "Pooch", who was the leader of the Barons and updates Ellison on the fates of his former friends. Several are dead, all of them scarred physically and emotionally from their time in the gang.

Eventually Ellison is bailed out and a Grand Jury ultimately dismisses all charges.

The book has a dedication to Ellison's friend Ted White, a jazz critic and fiction author who bailed him out of jail and who had encouraged him to write down his experiences.

== Television adaptation ==
Ellison later adapted "Book One: The Gang" into a teleplay for The Alfred Hitchcock Hour. The episode aired in 1964 under the slightly different title "Memo from Purgatory" and starred James Caan as the author Jay Shaw (based on Ellison), and Walter Koenig as the gang's leader. The character of Shaw decides to write a book about a juvenile street gang and researches his subject by joining The Barons gang in Brooklyn. Although this is the same gang Ellison joined to research Web of the City, the events of the episode were fictionalized.
