= Harlan Ellison's Watching =

1989 compilation by Harlan Ellison

- First edition hardcover
- Author: Harlan Ellison
- Cover artist: Ilene Meyer
- Language: English
- Subject: Film criticism
- Genre: Non-fiction
- Publisher: Underwood-Miller
- Publication date: 1989 (1st edition)
- Publication place: United States
- Media type: Print (Hardcover)
- Pages: 514 pp (first edition)
- ISBN: 978-0-88733-067-4
- OCLC: 19981018
- Dewey Decimal: 791.43 20
- LC Class: PN1995 .E58 1989

Harlan Ellison's Watching (ISBN 0-88733-067-3) is a 1989 compilation of 25 years' worth of essays and film reviews by Harlan Ellison, originally published in Cinema magazine, the Los Angeles Free Press, Starlog magazine, and The Magazine of Fantasy and Science Fiction among others.

== Synopsis ==
In the book, Ellison discusses his background as a film critic and his general views on film criticism. Highlights include a critique of Star Wars Episode IV: A New Hope (entitled "Luke Skywalker is a Nerd and Darth Vader Sucks Runny Eggs"), which he described as "shallow" and "a film without soul, without a core," and writing that Gremlins "suffers from the dreaded Jerry Lewis Syndrome: it vacillates between a disingenuous homeliness and an egomaniacal nastiness."

Ellison also discussed what he viewed as unjust treatment of films like Brazil and Dune by their respective studios. He also championed obscure films he considered of exemplary quality, such as Big Trouble in Little China, which had "some of the funniest lines spoken by any actor this year to produce a cheerfully blathering live-action cartoon that will give you release from the real pressures of your basically dreary lives" and Joe, which he said was "a visceral experience on a par with going black-belting with Bruce Lee. Joe will kick the shit out of you. It will set the blood slamming against your cranial walls. It will make you as cold as Ultima Thule."

== Reaction ==
In his review for the New York Times, Robert Moss wrote, "In contrast to the detached, impersonal tone of the average film critic, Mr. Ellison pronounces almost exclusively at the top of his voice...His style routinely mixes a standard critical idiom with esoteric vocabulary, slang, a liberal use of obscenities and many homemade coinages."
