= The Deathbird =

Novelette by Harlan Ellison

"The Deathbird" was originally published in the March 1973 issue of F&SF, illustrated by Leo & Diane Dillon.

"The Deathbird" is a novelette by American writer Harlan Ellison. It won the 1974 Hugo Award for Best Novelette and Locus Award for Best Short Story.

It has been included in the author's short story collection Deathbird Stories.

== Plot ==
The story is formatted as a test of sorts, worth three-quarters of some final grade. The action is interrupted at points with test questions, some of which do not make sense. Millions of years ago, "The Mad One", also known as Ialdabaoth or God, took over the earth in a sort of cosmic lawsuit. The original creators left behind one last member of their race, Dira, to tell humans the truth about their god, but the dominant traditions throughout the ages denounce Dira as evil. Now, the world is coming to an end and Nathan Stack, the latest incarnation of a long line of humans going back to Lilith's husband, is revived by Snake (aka Dira) after spending 250,000 years in an underground crypt to make the journey to the mountain where God lives. He is the only human capable of confronting him and putting the Earth out of its misery through the summoning of what is referred to as the Deathbird.

The story also contains a few side plots, presumably about Nathan Stack or previous reincarnations of him. These stories tell of people who have had to make difficult decisions, allowing loved ones to die. In one such story, his mother is partially paralyzed and suffering from cancer which will eventually, slowly and painfully, travel to her heart. She eventually convinces him to inject her with a lethal substance in a hypodermic needle, killing her and ending her pain. This situation is repeated at the end of the story, where Nathan Stack must "use the needle" to summon the Deathbird and end the pain of the planet.
