= The Beast That Shouted Love at the Heart of the World (short story) =

1968 science fiction short story by Harlan Ellison

- Short story by Harlan Ellison
- Country: United States
- Language: English
- Genre: Science fiction

Publication
- Published in: Galaxy Science Fiction
- Publication type: Periodical
- Publisher: Galaxy Publishing Corp
- Media type: Print (magazine, hardback & paperback)
- Publication date: June 1968

"The Beast That Shouted Love at the Heart of the World" is a 1968 science fiction short story by American writer Harlan Ellison. It won the Hugo Award for Best Short Story in 1969.

== Background ==
According to Ellison, the story was intended as an experiment. It is not a sequential story but is written as though events were taking place on the rim of a wheel with everything coming together at the center. The end result is that the structure of the story is difficult to analyze and only makes sense as a whole work.

== Publication history ==
The story was first published in the June 1968 edition of Galaxy Science Fiction as "The Beast That Shouted Love", and was collected with other Ellison short stories as the first story in The Beast That Shouted Love at the Heart of the World in 1969. Subsequent publications have been in collections such as Dark Stars, edited by Robert Silverberg, in 1969, The Hugo Winners: Volumes One and Two, edited by Isaac Asimov, in 1971, and as part of Ellison's own retrospective collection, Edgeworks 4, in 1997.

== Summary ==
The story includes many seemingly unrelated threads told in omniscient narration, ultimately connecting them with offhand mentions and details. The threads can be categorized as: events on Earth, events in an alien community known as the Concord, and descriptions of non-physical concepts.

A man, William Sterog, goes on a killing spree. He poisons 200 people with an insecticide stolen from a pest control man, kills 93 people on a jet flight by means of a time bomb planted in his mother's suitcase, and shoots 44 people in a stadium with a machine gun before he is arrested.

In presumably the far future, an expedition from Earth discovers a new planet with a 37-foot-tall (11 m) statue on it. The statue has an alien but beatific face. The figure is wearing a toga and grasping a strange object. The narration notes that the statue's expression is the very same that Sterog had when the judge sentenced him to death at his final court hearing.

The narration then goes on to describe a concept known as "Crosswhen" which is described as possibilities, outcomes, distance, and time all "beyond human thought."

Next, a violent and insane seven-headed dragon is captured and "drained" using a technique invented by an alien man named Semph. The dragon is described as being "crosswhen" to another subject referred to as "the maniac." The narration leaves it ambiguous to whether or not the maniac and the dragon are two distinct beings or perhaps even two distinct consciousness of the same mind. Semph talks with his rival, Linah, about the nature of the "draining." Semph argues that draining has possible consequence to others elsewhere while Linah, arguing on behalf of a community known as the Concord, argues that it is a necessary risk to ensure their own survival, even at the expense of others. The dragon is drained and the remnant, left behind following the draining, is a man. Semph then reveals that he has sent the drained aspects ("dangerous essences") elsewhere, not contained in a tank as planned. He alludes to these elements as part of an unelaborated "field." A panicked Linah demands to know where the aspects have been sent to.

The next thread is extremely brief. It mentions the term: Djam Karet (roughly translated as "the hour that stretches"), which it then uses throughout the next thread.

The narration goes on to tell of the historical meeting between Pope Leo I and Attila the Hun in 452. The details of the meeting are uncertain, but the result was that Attila did not attack Rome as he had done to other cities. The narration notes that the city had been attacked forty years earlier by Alaric the Goth and three years later by King Gaiseric. The narration implies connection of these actions (and Attila's inaction) as connected to the "field" and the drained mind of the seven-headed-dragon with randomness through time (or Djam Karet).

Semph is tried by the Concord, and is sentenced to be executed for his actions during the draining. In a final conversation with Linah, the nature of the draining is revealed to be extraction and condensation of insanity into a vapor-like form, from organisms. The vapor is usually sent outside Concord's domain (referred to as "the center") and sent elsewhere (referred to as "out there"). While Semph was against this protocol for the possibility that it affected other races (i.e., people on Earth), Linah sided with it to safeguard the Concord. The field mentioned earlier is a metaphysical entity that pulses with violence and madness; the alien beings of the Concord have been "draining" madness from their world and sending it to the Earth. As per tradition, after the execution, Linah builds a memorial for Semph which is implied to be the statue mentioned earlier.

The last thread deals with a near-madman who finds a box in the ruins of a city in Germany, on Earth, as he searches for food. He opens the box, releasing a wisp of purple violent smoke into the air, likely the vapor. The next day World War IV starts.

== Reception ==
The short story has been called a "marvelously effective meditation on the nature of evil" that weaves magic into its unpromising premise. It is considered one of the stories that signaled Ellison's development into a thoughtful and mature fantasist and secured his reputation as a bold science-fiction innovator.

== Other media connections ==
- Harlan Ellison plotted a story for Marvel Comics' The Incredible Hulk comic book, issue #140 (June 1971), under the title: "The Brute that Shouted Love at the Heart of the Atom".
- The Japanese title of Episode 26 of Neon Genesis Evangelion is called "The Beast that Shouted "AI" at the Heart of the World" (世界の中心でアイを叫んだけもの, Sekai no Chuushin de AI o Sakenda Kemono). The word アイ("AI") can be read as the Japanese word ai (love) but is also the regular transcription of English "I", continuing a minor theme of double meanings in Evangelion titles.

== Sources ==
- Weil, Ellen; Brooke-Rose, Christine; Wolfe, Gary K. (2002). Harlan Ellison: The Edge of Forever. Ohio State University Press. ISBN 0-8142-0892-4.
