= The Glass Teat =

Book of television reviews and essays written by Harlan Ellison

- First edition
- Author: Harlan Ellison
- Cover artist: Leo and Diane Dillon
- Language: English
- Publication date: 1970
- Publication place: United States

The Glass Teat: Essays of Opinion on Television is a 1970 compilation of television reviews and essays written by Harlan Ellison as a regular weekly column for the Los Angeles Free Press from late 1968 to early 1970, discussing the effects of television upon society.

== Summary ==
The title implies that TV viewers are analogous with unweaned children. Discussion of television is frequently interspersed in the essays with lengthy asides about Ellison's personal life, experiences and opinions in general.

== Reception and legacy ==
Modern critics have noted that his criticisms remain relevant. The book's topics were dictated by the trends and fashions of the day.

Ellison later collected a second volume of criticism entitled The Other Glass Teat, which was published in 1975.
