= Medea: Harlan's World =

US 1985 science fiction anthology

- First edition
- Cover artist: Frank Kelly Freas
- Language: English
- Genre: Science fiction
- Published: 1985
- Publisher: Phantasia Press
- Publication place: United States
- Media type: anthology

Medea: Harlan's World (1985; ISBN 0-932096-36-0) is a 1985 collection of science fiction short stories by different authors, all taking place on the same fictional moon. It was an experiment in collaborative science fictional world-building, featuring contributions by Hal Clement, Frank Herbert, and others.

It was based on a 1975 UCLA seminar called "10 Tuesdays Down a Rabbit Hole", held by Harlan Ellison and other science fiction authors.

== Contents ==
- Introduction: Cosmic Hod-Carriers
- Part I: The Specs
  - Introduction
  - Basic Concepts: Astrophysics, Geology (by Hal Clement)
  - Geology, Meteorology, Oceanography, Geography, Nomenclature, Biology (by Poul Anderson)
  - Biology, Ecology, Xenology (by Larry Niven)
  - Xenology, Sociology, Politics, Theology, Mathematics (by Frederik Pohl)
- Part II: The Concept Seminar
- Part III: The Extrapolations, the Questions
- Part IV: Second Thoughts
- Part V: The Stories
  - "Farside Station" by Jack Williamson
  - "Flare Time" by Larry Niven
  - "With Virgil Oddum at the East Pole" by Harlan Ellison
  - "Swanilda's Song" by Frederik Pohl
  - "Seasoning" by Hal Clement
  - "Concepts" by Thomas M. Disch
  - "Songs of a Sentient Flute" by Frank Herbert
  - "Hunter's Moon" by Poul Anderson
  - "The Promise" by Kate Wilhelm
  - "Why Dolphins Don't Bite" by Theodore Sturgeon
  - "Waiting for the Earthquake" by Robert Silverberg
