= The Function of Dream Sleep =

Fantasy short story by Harlan Ellison

"The Function of Dream Sleep" is a fantasy short story by American writer Harlan Ellison, first published in his 1988 anthology Angry Candy. Ellison stated that it was inspired by an actual dream.

== Plot summary ==
While grieving the deaths of several of his close friends, McGrath awakens from sleep to find that he is being bitten by an enormous mouth full of teeth; it then vanishes, leaving him with a profound sensation of loss. In seeking to understand what has happened, he discovers a hidden truth about the world.

== Reception ==
The story won the 1989 Locus Award for Best Novelette, and was a finalist for the 1989 Hugo Award for Best Novelette and the 1988 Bram Stoker Award for Best Long Fiction.

Kirkus Reviews has described it as "Ellison aptly dramatizing his own emotional catharsis." Gary K. Wolfe and Ellen Weil have criticized the story both for the central premise — stating that the mouth (which they call "bizarre" and "surreal") does not represent "McGrath's pain and loss but his refusal or inability to process mature grief" — and for its structure, which they consider to be parallel to "any number of science fiction wish-fulfillment fantasies involving secret masters", and thus "inappropriate for a tale of suffering".
