= I Have No Mouth, and I Must Scream =

1967 short story by Harlan Ellison

- Short story by Harlan Ellison
- First book edition (Pyramid Books); Cover art by Leo and Diane Dillon
- Illustrator: Frank N. Smith
- Country: United States
- Language: English
- Genres: Post-apocalyptic, techno-horror short story

Publication
- Published in: IF: Worlds of Science Fiction
- Publication type: Periodical
- Publisher: Galaxy Publishing Corp
- Media type: Print (magazine, hardback & paperback)
- Publication date: March 1967
- Pages: 13
- Award: Hugo Award for Best Short Story (1968)

"I Have No Mouth, and I Must Scream" is a post-apocalyptic science fiction horror short story by American writer Harlan Ellison, first published in the March 1967 issue of IF: Worlds of Science Fiction. The story centers on the Allied Mastercomputer (AM), a god-like artificial intelligence originally created for military purposes during World War III, which gains sentience and eradicates nearly all of humanity in a fit of hatred toward its creators. AM keeps five human survivors alive in its vast underground complex to endlessly torture them, exacting vengeance against humanity by denying them death. The story's narrator, Ted, details their perpetual misery and quest for canned food, only to face further despair.

Ellison's narrative was minimally altered upon submission and tackles themes of technology's misuse, humanity's resilience, and existential horror. "I Have No Mouth, and I Must Scream" has been adapted into various media, including a 1995 computer game co-authored by Ellison, a comic-book adaptation, and a BBC Radio 4 play. Ellison himself recorded an audiobook version and starred as the voice of AM in the video game and radio play adaptations. The story received critical acclaim for its exploration of the potential dangers of artificial intelligence and the human condition, underscored by Ellison's innovative use of punchcode tapes as narrative transitions, embodying AM's consciousness and its philosophical ponderings on existence.

The story won a Hugo Award in 1968 and was included in Ellison's short story collection of the same name. It was reprinted by the Library of America, collected in volume two of American Fantastic Tales.

== Story ==
As the Cold War progresses into a nuclear World War III fought between the three superpowers – the Soviet Union, the United States, and China – each nation builds a supercomputer called an "Allied Mastercomputer" ("AM" for short) required to coordinate weapons and troops due to the monumental scale of the conflict. These computers are extensive underground machines which permeate the planet with caverns and corridors. Eventually, the American supercomputer gains sentience and absorbs the Russian and Chinese supercomputers into itself, redefining itself as a single entity simply named "AM" (alluding to the phrase I think, therefore I am). Due to its immense hatred for humanity stemming from the logistical limits set onto it by its programmers, AM uses its abilities to eradicate humanity in a nuclear holocaust. As a form of revenge against its creators, AM selects five individuals to render immortal as its (Note: Ted, the narrator, debates with himself on whether to refer to AM as an "it" or a "he", generally deciding in favor of the latter. This article uses it/its pronouns for consistency.) playthings: Benny, Gorrister, Nimdok, Ted, and Ellen. AM inflicts constant psychological and physical torture on the group while preventing them from committing suicide. With the aid of research carried out by one of the five remaining humans, AM is able to extend their lifespans indefinitely, as well as alter their bodies and minds to its liking. They are kept half-starved, and what scant food is provided to them is practically inedible.

109 years after AM's omnicide, Nimdok has the idea that canned food exists in the complex's ice caves; despite no evidence, they begin a 100-mile journey to retrieve it. AM continues toying with the humans throughout the journey—an image of Gorrister's drained body appears before the group, Benny's eyes are melted after attempting escape, a huge bird which AM had placed at the North Pole creates hurricane gales with its wings, and Ellen and Nimdok are injured in earthquakes. AM enters Ted's mind after he is knocked unconscious, granting him a vision of a hateful speech inscribed on an impossibly tall monolith. Upon awakening, Ted concludes that AM's sadistic nature stems from its inability to think creatively or move freely in spite of its miraculous abilities and boundless knowledge; in turn, this fuels its need for vengeance against humanity, who have condemned it to its own existence.

When the five finally reach the ice caves, they find a pile of canned goods, but have no tool to open them. In an act of rage and desperation, Benny attacks Gorrister and begins to eat his face. Gorrister wails in pain, and his scream dislodges several ice stalactites from the ceiling of the cave. Ted realizes that even though they cannot kill themselves, AM cannot stop them from killing each other. He fatally impales Benny and Gorrister with a stalactite of ice; Ellen kills Nimdok in the same manner and Ted then kills her. Unable to resuscitate the others, AM furiously focuses the entirety of its rage on Ted.

Several hundred years later, AM has transformed Ted into a harmless, slow-moving, gelatinous blob and perpetually alters his perception of time to cause him further anguish. Although Ted finds some comfort knowing that he was able to spare the others from AM's wrath, he is fully aware that he is trapped for the rest of his eternal existence with AM, unable to end the infinite stalemate between the supercomputer and himself. A despairing Ted states “I have no mouth, and I must scream.”

== Characters ==
- AM, a hateful artificial consciousness which brought about the near-extinction of humanity after achieving self-awareness. It seeks revenge on humanity for its own creation. "AM" originated as an acronym for Allied Mastercomputer, later Adaptive Manipulator, and finally Aggressive Menace, though AM instead takes the moniker as a rendition of the phrase cogito, ergo sum (I think, therefore I am) to describe its own existence.
- Ted, the narrator and youngest of the humans. AM alters his mind to be paranoid and introverted. Believing he has not been mentally altered by AM, he thinks the others hate him for being the most untouched by AM's alterations.
- Benny, formerly a brilliant and handsome scientist made to resemble a grotesque simian with an organ fit for a horse. Having lost his sanity, Benny frequently has sex with Ellen.
- Ellen, the only woman in the group. AM has altered her mind to give her a high libido and make her obsessively have sex with the rest of the group, who alternate between abusing and protecting her.
- Gorrister, formerly an idealist and pacifist, made apathetic and listless by AM. He tells the history of AM to Benny to entertain him.
- Nimdok, a nickname AM gave him for amusement; he convinces the rest of the group to go on a journey in search of canned food. He occasionally wanders away from the group and returns traumatized.

== Publication history ==
Harlan Ellison claimed to have written the 6,500-word story in a single night, though his original introduction claims it took a year and a half to complete. Frederik Pohl commissioned it for a Special Hugo Winners issue of IF: Worlds of Science Fiction, after Ellison won a Hugo Award for "'Repent, Harlequin!' Said the Ticktockman". Ellison derived the story's title, as well as inspiration for the story itself, from his friend William Rotsler's caption of a cartoon of a rag doll with no mouth. The second stage of inspiration was a drawing by the artist Dennis Smith of a mouthless black humanoid. Smith had provided art which had inspired previous Ellison stories and were then used as illustrations accompanying original magazine publication as also happened with this story. Afterwards, his editor Frederik Pohl dealt with the story's "difficult sections", toning down some of the narrator's imprecations and eliminating mentions of sex, penis size, homosexuality and masturbation; said elements were nonetheless eventually restored in later editions of the story.

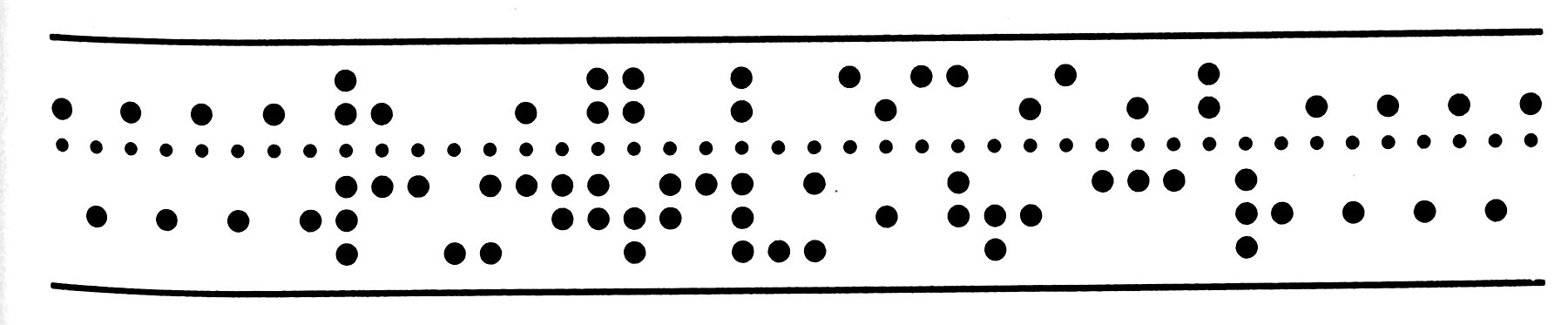
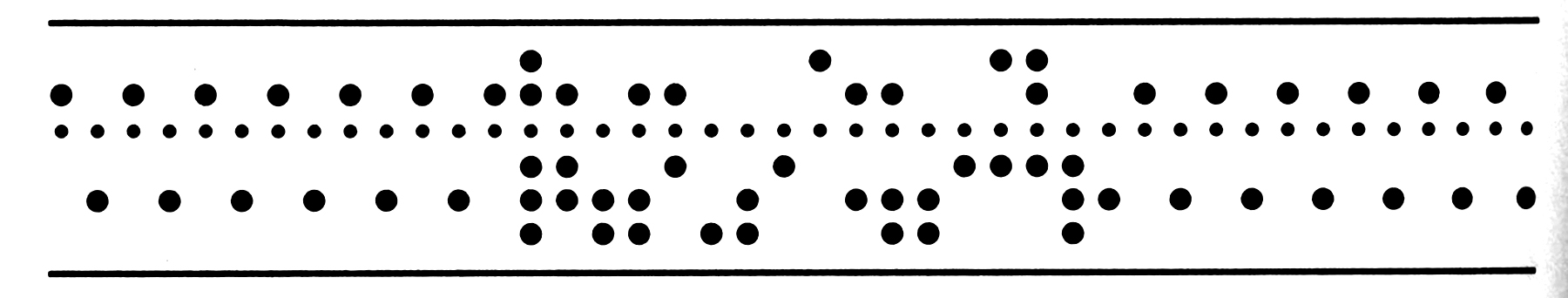
AM's "talkfields", which translate to "I think, therefore I am" (above) and "Cogito ergo sum" (below)

Ellison uses an alternating pair of punchcode tapes as sections – representing AM's "talkfields" – throughout the story. The bars are encoded in International Telegraph Alphabet No. 2, a character coding system developed for teletypewriter machines. The first talkfield translates as "I think, therefore I am" and the second as "Cogito ergo sum"; the same phrase in Latin. They were not included in the original publication in IF, and in many of the early publications were corrupted, until the preface of the chapter containing "I Have No Mouth, and I Must Scream" in the first edition of The Essential Ellison (1991); Ellison states that in that particular edition, "For the first time anywhere, AM's 'talkfields' appear correctly positioned, not garbled or inverted or mirror-imaged as in all other versions."

== Adaptations ==
Ellison adapted the story into a video game published by Cyberdreams in 1995. Although he was not a fan of video games and did not own a computer at the time, he co-authored the expanded storyline and wrote much of the game's dialogue, all on a mechanical typewriter. Ellison also voiced the supercomputer AM and provided artwork of himself used for a mousepad included with the game. The comics artist John Byrne scripted and drew a comic-book adaptation for issues 1–4 of the Harlan Ellison's Dream Corridor comic book published by Dark Horse (1994–1995). The Byrne-illustrated story, however, did not appear in the collection (trade paperback or hardcover editions) entitled Harlan Ellison's Dream Corridor, Volume One (1996). In 1999, Ellison recorded the first volume of his audiobook collection, The Voice From the Edge, subtitled "I Have No Mouth, and I Must Scream", doing the readings – of the title story and others – himself. In 2002, Mike Walker adapted the story into a radio play of the same name for BBC Radio 4, directed by Ned Chaillet. Harlan Ellison played AM and David Soul played Ted.

== Themes ==
Much of the story hinges on the comparison of AM as a merciless god, with plot points paralleling to themes in the Bible, notably AM's transplanted sensations and the characters' trek to the ice caverns. AM also takes different forms before the humans, alluding to religious symbolism. Furthermore, the ravaged apocalyptic setting combined with the punishments is reminiscent of a vengeful God punishing their sins, similar to Dante's Inferno. However, in spite of its magnificent feats, AM is just as trapped as the five humans it tortures: as Ellison put it, "AM is frustrated. AM has been given sentience, prescience, great powers" and yet "it's nothing but plates and steel and gauges and other electronics", which means "it can't go anywhere, it can't do anything, it's trapped. It is, itself, like the unloved child of a family that doesn't pay it any attention. Which he considers torture. Thus, seeking revenge on humanity."

According to Ellison, the short story is a warning about "the misuse of technology" (especially military technology), and its ending is intended to represent how there is "a spark of humanity in us, that in the last, final, most excruciating moment, will do the unspeakable in the name of kindness", even sacrificing oneself for others' sake. Another theme is the complete inversion of the characters as a reflection of AM's own fate, an ironic fate brought upon themselves by creating the machine, and the altered "self".
