= Web of the City =

1958 debut novel by Harlan Ellison

- First edition (original title)
- Author: Harlan Ellison
- Language: English
- Publisher: Pyramid Books
- Publication date: 1958
- Publication place: United States
- Media type: Print (paperback)
- Pages: 190
- OCLC: 9304637
- LC Class: CPB Box no. 2970 vol. 20

Web of the City (originally published as Rumble) is the first novel written by American author Harlan Ellison. The novel follows the story of Rusty Santoro, a teenage member of the fictional Cougars street gang in the 1950s Brooklyn, New York. In order to research the book, Ellison spent time in an actual street gang in Brooklyn. His book Memos from Purgatory (1961) is a non-fiction account of his time in the Barons.

== Background ==
In 1954, Harlan Ellison – inspired by the juvenile delinquency-themed novels of Hal Ellson (Note: No relation to Harlan Ellison) – decided to research and write a novel about the teenage street gangs of Brooklyn. Before writing the novel, Ellison became a member of the Brooklyn gang The Barons under an assumed name. The gang's territory was in Red Hook, considered to be one of the most dangerous neighborhoods in Brooklyn. He acted as "war counselor" for the gang for ten weeks before leaving.

After leaving the street gang, Ellison went to Basic Training at Fort Benning, Georgia, to begin his military service. The bulk of the novel was written during his spare time at the camp between mid-1956 and March 1957. In an introduction to the 2013 reprint by Hard Case Crime, Ellison claimed he wrote most of the manuscript in the evening hours while sitting in the toilet with a board on his lap and his portable typewriter atop the board. The book was originally bought by Walter Fultz, an editor at the small independent publishing company Lion Books. The company went out of business before it could publish Web of the City, but Pyramid Books soon bought the rights to Lion's catalog. Pyramid changed the name to Rumble and published it in 1958, while Ellison was a private in the army. The first Ellison knew of the title change was when he received a copy of the book (with other volumes) to review.

== Plot summary ==
The plot revolves around the character of Rusty Santoro, a member of a fictional Brooklyn street gang. In the novel, Santoro is caught between his meager prospects in the neighborhood and obligations to his gang, The Cougars. Throughout the book he struggles with the prospect of leaving his neighborhood and his gang life behind. The novel depicts street fights, murders, and other realities of gang life in urban areas.

== Proposed film adaptation ==
In the 1960s American International Pictures announced it was going to make a film version starring Frankie Avalon and Annette Funicello.
