= Adrift Just Off the Islets of Langerhans =

Short story by Harlan Ellison

- Short story by Harlan Ellison
- Country: United States
- Language: English
- Genre: Science fiction

Publication
- Published in: The Magazine of Fantasy & Science Fiction
- Publication type: Periodical
- Publisher: Mercury Press
- Media type: Print (magazine)
- Publication date: October 1974

"Adrift Just Off the Islets of Langerhans: Latitude 38° 54' N, Longitude 77° 00' 13" W" is a 1974 science fiction novelette by American writer Harlan Ellison. It was originally published in The Magazine of Fantasy & Science Fiction in October 1974, and subsequently republished in Ellison's 1975 collection of god-themed short fiction, Deathbird Stories, in the 1991 Byron Preiss-edited anthology The Ultimate Werewolf, and in Ellison's 2006 anthology The Essential Ellison: A 50 Year Retrospective.

The islets of Langerhans are part of the pancreas.

== Synopsis ==
Larry Talbot wants to die, but cannot unless he first knows the exact physical location of his soul. To this end, he tracks down Victor Frankenstein, who sends him on a fantastic voyage.

The title latitude and longitude indicate a location in Washington, D.C., next to Union Station (38°54′00″N 77°00′13″W).

== Reception ==
"Adrift Just Off the Islets of Langerhans" won the 1975 Hugo Award for Best Novelette and the 1975 Locus Award for Best Novelette.

Jayme Lynn Blaschke has described "Adrift Just Off the Islets of Langerhans" as "impenetrable and baffling", and John C. Wright has stated that his only recollection of the story is "a vague sense of disgust"—and that in the story, Dr Frankenstein was portrayed as quoting The Wizard of Oz. Conversely, in 1977, George Edgar Slusser referred to the tale as "one of (Ellison's) most ambitious and provocative tales to date."
