= Jacek Yerka =

Polish surrealist painter from Toruń

- Born: Jacek Kowalski; 1952 (age 73–74); Toruń, Poland
- Education: Nicolaus Copernicus University in Toruń
- Known for: Painting
- Movement: Surrealism
- Family: Married with 4 daughters
- Awards: 1995 World Fantasy Award

Jacek Yerka (born Jacek Kowalski in 1952) is a Polish surrealist painter from Toruń. Yerka's work has been exhibited in Poland, Germany, Monaco, France, and the United States. His work has been displayed in Polish art museums.

== Early life ==
Jacek Yerka was born in Toruń, Poland in 1952. He was born into an artistic family with both his parents graduates from a local fine art academy. His earliest memories were of paints, inks, paper, erasers and brushes. As a child, Yerka loved to draw and make sculptures. He hated playing outside, and preferred to sit down with a pencil, creating and exploring his own world. This difference between the other children in his primary school led to social problems with his peers and Yerka describes his primary school life as being a "grey, sometimes horrifying reality". However, Yerka later became 'untouchable' in his high school due to his clever sketches of the school's worst bullies.

== Life in the Academy ==
Yerka had never intended to be an artist like his parents and was considering doing astronomy or medicine. However, a year before his final exam, he decided for the first time to try working with paint, which resulted in his decision to study fine art and graphic design instead. According to Yerka, during his period studying in the academy he was pressured by his instructors to eschew detail and realism in favor of the fashion of the times - but did not relent, adhering to the meticulous classic Flemish technique that still typifies his work. In time they came to see him as a brilliant - though troubled - talent.

During his studies at the academy, each day was split into two sections. In the morning and afternoon he had to do tests, projects and attend lectures, and during the evening he was given a couple hours to work at a painting that was shown only to his family and friends. He graduated from the Faculty of Fine Arts at Nicolaus Copernicus University in Toruń, specializing in printmaking.

== Life as an artist ==
Yerka began working full-time as an artist in 1980. He had several contracts with galleries in Warsaw and also worked for commissions. He cites Hieronymus Bosch, Pieter Bruegel, Cagliostro, Jan van Eyck, and Hugo van der Goes as formative influences on his work. His subject matter ranges from odd beasts to whimsical landscapes incorporating extraordinary architecture, and includes imagery gleaned from his childhood, such as his grandmother's kitchen. Says Yerka, "For me, the 1950s were a kind of golden age ... If I were, for instance, to paint a computer, it would definitely have a pre-war aesthetic to it."

In 1990, Yerka received a contract with Hollywood producer Rene Daalder to design figures, monster-machines and surreal landscapes for the science fiction film Strawberry Fields, based on the Beatles song of the same name. The film planned to combine both Yerka's work with songs from the Beatles and Yerka participated in the first stage of its production. His work typically progresses from a graphite sketch, to crayon drawing, then a pastel com, and finally an acrylic painting.

Yerka solicits input on developing works from his wife and four daughters.

== Awards ==
- World Fantasy Award for Best Artist, 1995
- Awarded an honorary paver placard by the city of Toruń, June 24, 2008
