= How Interesting: A Tiny Man =

2010 short story by Harlan Ellison, originally published in Realms of Fantasy

"How Interesting: A Tiny Man" is a 2010 science fiction/magical realism short story by American writer Harlan Ellison. It was first published in Realms of Fantasy.

== Plot summary ==
A scientist creates a tiny man. The tiny man is initially very popular, but then draws the hatred of the world, and so the tiny man must flee, together with the scientist (who is now likewise hated, for having created the tiny man).

== Reception ==
"How Interesting: A Tiny Man" won the 2010 Nebula Award for Best Short Story, tied with Kij Johnson's "Ponies". It was Ellison's final Nebula nomination and win, of his record-setting eight nominations and three wins.

Tor.com calls the story "deceptively simple", with "execution (that) is flawless" and a "Geppetto-like" narrator, while Publishers Weekly describes it as "memorably depict(ing) humanity's smallness of spirit". The SF Site, however, felt it was "contrived and less than profound".

Nick Mamatas compared "How Interesting: A Tiny Man" negatively to Ellison's other Nebula-winning short stories, and stated that the story's two mutually exclusive endings (in one, the tiny man is killed; in the other, he becomes God) are evocative of the process of writing short stories. Ben Peek considered it to be "more allegory than (...) anything else", and interpreted it as being about how the media "give(s) everyone a voice", and also about how Ellison was treated by science fiction fandom.
