= "Repent, Harlequin!" Said the Ticktockman =

Short story by Harlan Ellison

"'Repent, Harlequin!' Said the Ticktockman"
- Short story by Harlan Ellison
- Country: United States
- Language: English
- Genre: Science fiction short story

Publication
- Published in: Galaxy
- Publication type: Periodical
- Publisher: Galaxy Publishing Corporation
- Media type: Print (Magazine)
- Publication date: December 1965
- Pages: 11
- Awards: Nebula Award for Best Short Story (1966); Hugo Award for Best Short Fiction (1966); 3rd Locus Online Best 20th Century Short Story (2012); Prometheus Hall of Fame Award (2015)

"'Repent, Harlequin!' Said the Ticktockman" is a 1965 dystopian science fiction short story by American writer Harlan Ellison. First published in the science fiction magazine Galaxy in December 1965, it won the 1965 Nebula Award for Best Short Story, the 1966 Hugo Award for Best Short Fiction, and the 2015 Prometheus Hall of Fame Award.

"'Repent, Harlequin!' Said the Ticktockman" was written in a single six-hour session as a submission to a Milford Writer's Workshop the following day. A version of the story, read by Ellison, was recorded and issued on vinyl, but has long been out of print. The audio recording has since been reissued with other stories, by Blackstone Audio, under the title "The Voice From the Edge, Vol. 1".

The story was first collected in Ellison's Paingod and Other Delusions and has also appeared in several retrospective volumes of Ellison's work, including Alone Against Tomorrow, The Fantasies of Harlan Ellison, The Essential Ellison, Troublemakers and The Top of the Volcano. The story has been translated into a number of other languages.

== Plot ==
The story opens with an epigraph from Civil Disobedience by Henry David Thoreau.

In a dystopian future, time is strictly regulated and everyone must do everything according to an extremely precise time schedule. Perpetrators are punished for the crime of being late by having their lives shortened by an amount of time equal to the delay they have caused. These punishments are administered by the Master Timekeeper, nicknamed the "Ticktockman," who uses a device called a "cardioplate" to stop the heart of any violator who has lost all the remaining time in their life through repeated violations.

Everett C. Marm, disguised as the anarchical Harlequin, engages in whimsical rebellion against the Ticktockman. Everett is in a relationship with a girl named Pretty Alice, who is exasperated by the fact that he is never on time. The Harlequin disrupts the carefully kept schedule of his society with methods such as distracting factory workers from their tasks by showering them with thousands of multicolored jelly beans or giving public speeches through a bullhorn to encourage people to ignore their schedules, forcing the Ticktockman to pull people off their normal jobs to hunt for him.

Eventually, the Harlequin is captured. The Ticktockman tells him that Pretty Alice has betrayed him, wanting to return to the punctual society everyone else lives in. The Harlequin sneers at the Ticktockman's command for him to repent. However, the Ticktockman decides not to stop the Harlequin's heart, and instead sends him to Coventry. The brainwashed Harlequin later reappears in public to announce that he was wrong before and that it is always good to be on time.

At the end of the story, the Ticktockman scoffs in disbelief at the news, delivered by one of his subordinates, that he has fallen three minutes behind schedule.

== Reception ==
Donald A. Wollheim and Terry Carr selected the story for the anthology World's Best Science Fiction: 1966. When reviewing the collection, Algis Budrys faulted it as a "primitive statement ... about [the] solidly acceptable idea [that] regimentation is bad".

== Copyright suit ==
On 15 September 2011, Ellison filed a lawsuit in federal court in California, claiming that the plot of the 2011 film In Time was based on "Repent...". The suit, naming New Regency and director Andrew Niccol as well as a number of anonymous John Does, appears to base its claim on the similarity that both the completed film and Ellison's story concern a dystopian future in which people have a set amount of time to live which can be revoked, given certain pertaining circumstances by a recognized authority known as a Timekeeper. The suit initially demanded an injunction against the film's release, though Ellison later altered his suit to instead ask for screen credit before ultimately dropping the suit, with both sides releasing the following joint statement: "After seeing the film In Time, Harlan Ellison decided to voluntarily dismiss the Action. No payment or screen credit was promised or given to Harlan Ellison. The parties wish each other well, and have no further comment on the matter."

== See also ==
- Dystopia
- In Time
- Logan's Run
- Nineteen Eighty-Four
- The Price of Life (1987 film)
