= Harlan Ellison =

American writer (1934–2018)

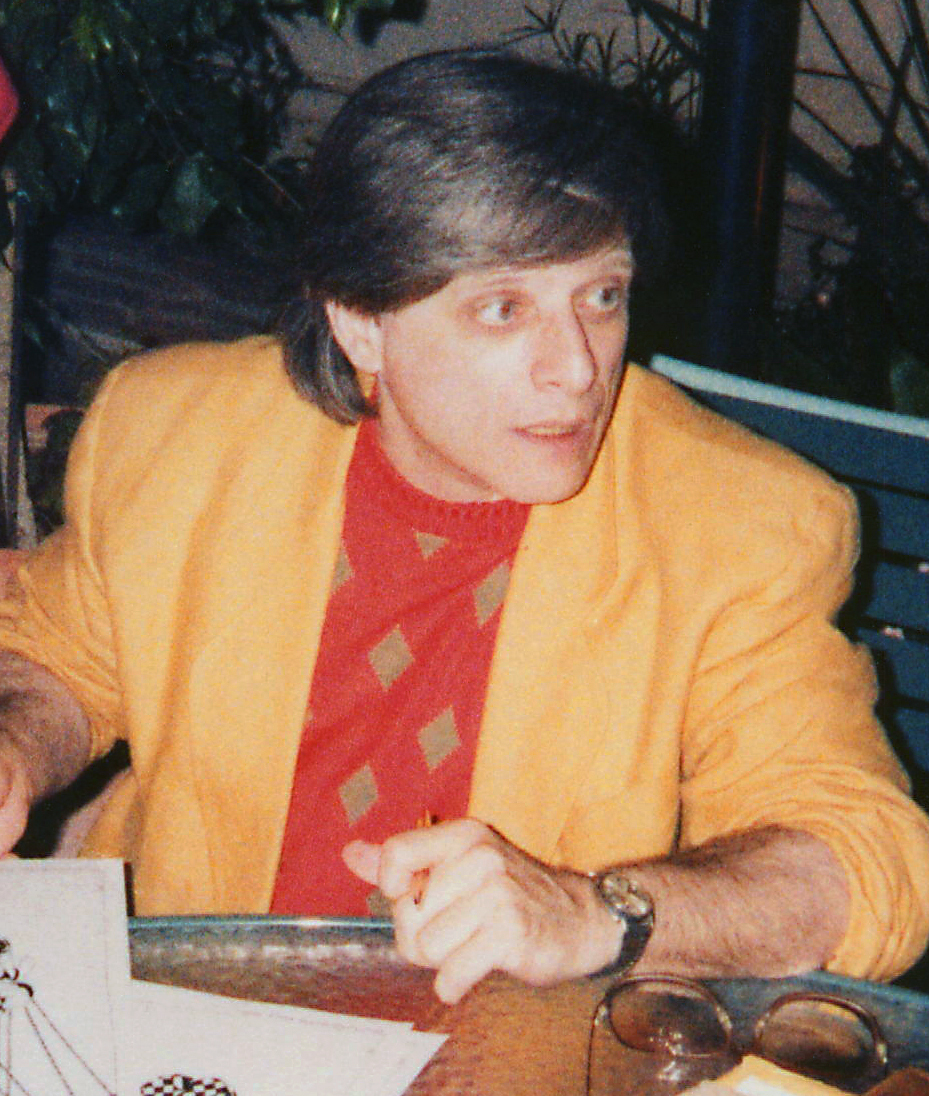
- Ellison in 1986
- Born: Harlan Jay Ellison; May 27, 1934; Cleveland, Ohio, U.S.
- Died: June 28, 2018 (aged 84); Los Angeles, California, U.S.
- Occupations: Author; screenwriter; essayist
- Spouses: Charlotte B. Stein (m. 1956; div. 1960); Billie Joyce Sanders (m. 1960; div. 1963); Loretta (Basham) Patrick (m. 1966; div. 1966); Lori Horowitz (m. 1976; div c. 1977); Susan Toth (m. 1986)
- Writing career
- Pen name: Cordwainer Bird, Nalrah Nosille, and 8 others
- Period: 1949–2018
- Genres: Speculative fiction, fantasy, crime fiction, mystery, horror, science fiction, film and television criticism
- Notable works: Dangerous Visions (editor), A Boy and His Dog, "I Have No Mouth, and I Must Scream", "'Repent, Harlequin!' Said the Ticktockman", "The City on the Edge of Forever"
- Movement: New Wave
- Website: harlanellison.com/home.htm

Harlan Jay Ellison (May 27, 1934 – June 28, 2018) was an American writer, known for his prolific and influential work in New Wave speculative fiction and for his outspoken, combative personality. His published works include more than 1,700 short stories, novellas, screenplays, comic-book scripts, teleplays, essays, and a wide range of criticism covering literature, film, television, and print media.

Some of his best-known works include the 1967 Star Trek episode "The City on the Edge of Forever", which is regarded as one of the best episodes in the Star Trek franchise — he subsequently wrote a book about the experience that includes his original teleplay — his A Boy and His Dog cycle (which was made into a film), and his short stories "I Have No Mouth, and I Must Scream" (later adapted by Ellison into a video game) and "'Repent, Harlequin!' Said the Ticktockman". He was also editor and anthologist for Dangerous Visions (1967) and Again, Dangerous Visions (1972). Ellison won numerous awards, including multiple Hugos, Nebulas, and Edgars.

== Biography ==
=== Early life and career ===
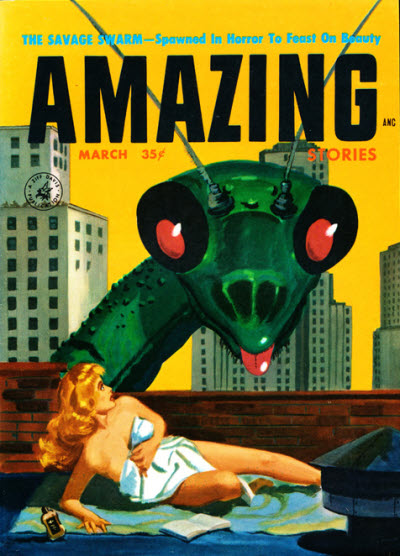
Ellison's 1957 novella "The Savage Swarm", cover-featured in Amazing Stories, was collected under the author's preferred title, "The Air from the Past", in Coffin Nails (2016).

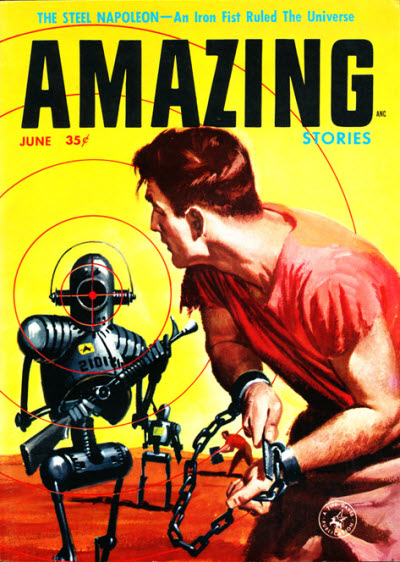
A few months later, another Ellison novella, "The Steel Napoleon", also took the cover of Amazing. It, too, was collected in Coffin Nails (2016).

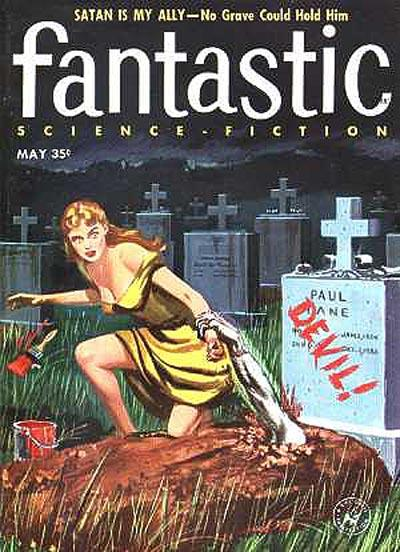
Another Coffin Nails (2016) novella, "Satan Is My Ally", was the cover story on the May 1957 issue of Fantastic Science Fiction. It also appeared in Possibly Impossible (2021).

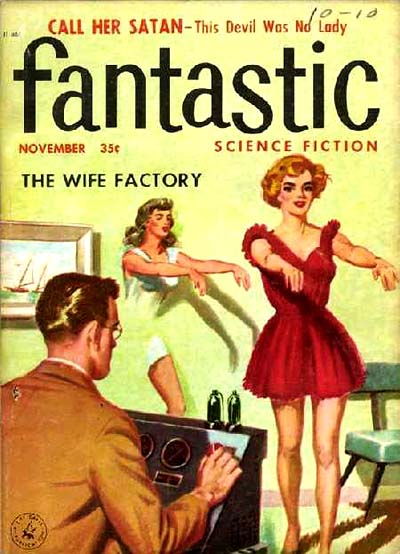
Ellison wrote "The Wife Factory" for Fantastic under the house name "Clyde Mitchell". It appeared in the November 1957 issue. The novella was collected in Coffin Nails (2016).

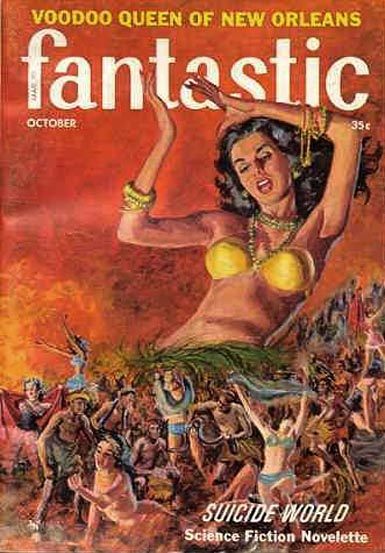
Ellison's "Suicide World", the cover story for the October 1958 Fantastic, was collected in Coffin Nails (2016) and Possibly Impossible (2021) under the author's preferred title: "Waste".

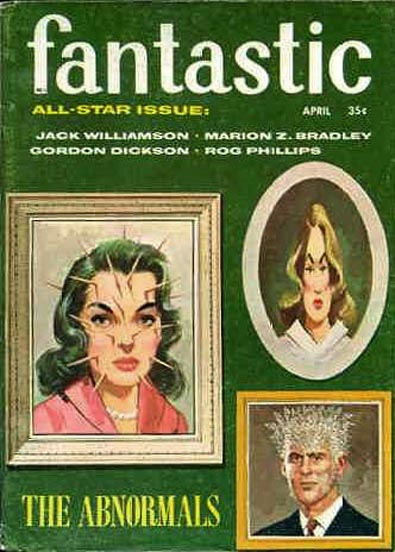
Ellison's "The Abnormals", the cover story for the April 1959 Fantastic, appears in Ellison collections as "The Discarded".

Ellison was born to a Jewish family in Cleveland, Ohio, on May 27, 1934, the son of Serita (née Rosenthal) and Louis Laverne Ellison, a dentist and jeweler. His older sister Beverly was born in 1926. Some time after Beverly's birth, his family moved to Painesville, Ohio, but returned to Cleveland in 1949, following his father's death. Ellison frequently ran away from home. In an interview with Tom Snyder, he would later claim it was due to discrimination by his high school peers. Throughout Ellison's childhood, antisemitism was widespread throughout America, which led to his early life spent in isolation. According to Ellison, by age 18 he had completed a series of odd jobs as a "tuna fisherman off the coast of Galveston, itinerant crop-picker down in New Orleans, hired gun for a wealthy neurotic, nitroglycerine truck driver in North Carolina, short-order cook, cab driver, lithographer, book salesman, floorwalker in a department store, door-to-door brush salesman, and as a youngster, an actor in several productions at the Cleveland Play House". In 1947, a fan letter he wrote to Real Fact Comics became his first published writing.

Ellison attended Ohio State University for 18 months (1951–53) before being expelled. Famous for self mythologizing, he claimed in interviews he was expelled for verbally or physically abusing a creative writing professor who excoriated the science fiction genre and Ellison's writing. He also claimed to have sent the professor a copy of every story he published. A biography published about him (Weil and Wolfe), however, found that he was expelled for having a “a reported grade point average of .086.”

Ellison published two serialized stories in the Cleveland News during 1949, and he sold a story to EC Comics early in the 1950s. During this period, Ellison was an active member of science fiction fandom. He published his own science fiction fanzines, such as Dimensions, which had previously been the Bulletin of the Cleveland Science Fantasy Society and later Science Fantasy Bulletin. Ellison moved to New York City in 1955 and lived with Robert Silverberg as they both pursued writing careers. Over the next two years, he published more than 100 short stories and articles. The short stories collected as Sex Gang — which Ellison described in a 2012 interview as "mainstream erotica"—date from this period.

He served in the U.S. Army from 1957 to 1959. His first novel, Web of the City, was published under the title Rumble during his military service in 1958, and Ellison said that he had written the bulk of it while undergoing basic training at Fort Benning, Georgia. He served in the Public Information Office at Fort Knox, Kentucky, where he wrote articles and reviews for the post's weekly newspaper.

After leaving the army, he relocated to Chicago, where he edited Rogue magazine.

=== Hollywood and beyond ===
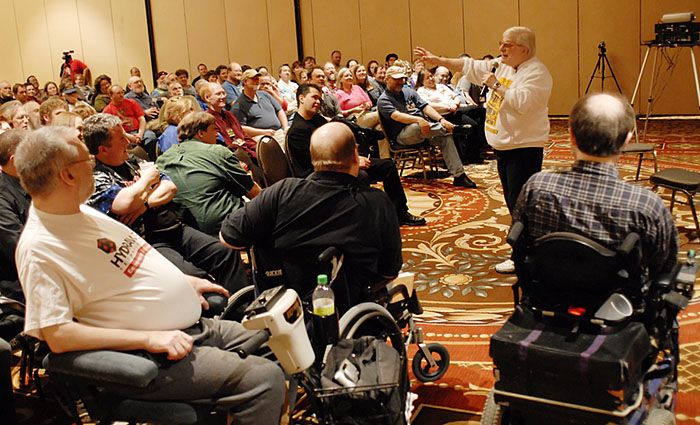
Ellison speaking at an SF convention, 2006

Ellison moved to California in 1962 and began selling his writing to Hollywood. Ellison sold scripts to many television shows: Burke's Law (4 episodes), Route 66, The Outer Limits, The Alfred Hitchcock Hour, Star Trek, The Man from U.N.C.L.E. (2 episodes), Cimarron Strip and The Flying Nun.

Ellison's screenplay for the Star Trek episode "The City on the Edge of Forever" is often considered the best of the 79 episodes in the series.

He co-wrote the screenplay for The Oscar (1966), starring Stephen Boyd and Tony Bennett.

In 1965, he participated in the second and third Selma to Montgomery marches, led by Martin Luther King Jr.

In 1966, the journalist Gay Talese wrote a profile of Frank Sinatra for Esquire, which the magazine later named as the best magazine piece ever written. The article, entitled "Frank Sinatra Has a Cold", briefly describes a verbal clash between Sinatra and Ellison, in which the crooner took exception to Ellison's boots during a billiards game Ellison was playing with Omar Sharif, Leo Durocher, and Peter Falk.

Ellison was hired as a writer for Walt Disney Studios, but was fired on his first day after Roy O. Disney overheard him in the studio commissary joking about making a pornographic animated film featuring Disney characters.

Ellison continued to publish short fiction and nonfiction pieces in various publications, including some of his best known stories. "'Repent, Harlequin!' Said the Ticktockman" (1965) is a celebration of civil disobedience against repressive authority. "I Have No Mouth, and I Must Scream" (1967) is a story where five humans are tormented by an all-knowing computer throughout eternity. The story was the basis of a 1995 computer game; Ellison participated in the game's design and provided the voice of the god-computer AM. Another story, "A Boy and His Dog", examines the nature of friendship and love in a violent, post-apocalyptic world and was made into the 1975 film of the same name, starring Don Johnson.

In 1967, Ellison edited the Dangerous Visions collection, which attracted a "special citation at the 26th World SF Convention for editing 'the most significant and controversial SF book published in 1967.'" In his introduction Isaac Asimov described it as epitomising a "second revolution" in science fiction as "science receded and modern fictional techniques came to the fore."

From 1968 to 1970, Ellison wrote a regular column on television for the Los Angeles Free Press. Titled "The Glass Teat", Ellison's column examined television's impact on the politics and culture of the time, including its presentations of sex, politics, race, the Vietnam War, and violence. The essays were collected in two anthologies, The Glass Teat: Essays of Opinion on Television followed by The Other Glass Teat.

Ellison served as creative consultant to the 1980s version of The Twilight Zone science fiction TV series and as a conceptual consultant for Babylon 5. As a member of the Screen Actors Guild (SAG), he had voice-over credits for shows, including The Pirates of Dark Water, Mother Goose and Grimm, Space Cases, Phantom 2040, and Babylon 5, and made an onscreen appearance in the Babylon 5 episode "The Face of the Enemy".

A frequent guest on the Los Angeles science fiction/fantasy culture radio show Hour 25, hosted by Mike Hodel, Ellison took over as host when Hodel died. Ellison's tenure was from May 1986 to June 1987.

Ellison's short story "The Man Who Rowed Christopher Columbus Ashore" (1992) was selected for inclusion in the 1993 edition of The Best American Short Stories.

Ellison, as an audio actor/reader, was nominated for a Grammy Award for Best Spoken Word Album for Children twice and won several Audie Awards.

In 2014, Ellison made a guest appearance on the album Finding Love in Hell by the stoner rock band Leaving Babylon, reading his piece "The Silence" (originally published in Mind Fields) as an introduction to the song "Dead to Me."

Ellison's official website, harlanellison.com, was launched in 1995 as a fan page; for several years, Ellison was a regular poster in its discussion forum.

Ellison's voice is one of 80 used in the NPRmageddon podcast (which is unrelated to National Public Radio), which appeared after his death.

=== Personal life and death ===
Ellison married five times; each relationship ended within a few years, except the last. His first wife was Charlotte Stein, whom he married in 1956. They divorced in 1960, and he later described the marriage as "four years of hell as sustained as the whine of a generator." Later that year he married Billie Joyce Sanders; they divorced in 1963. His 1966 marriage to Loretta Patrick lasted only seven weeks. In 1976, he married Lori Horowitz. He was 41 and she was 19, and he later said of the marriage, "I was desperately in love with her, but it was a stupid marriage on my part." They were divorced after eight months. He briefly had a relationship with actress Grace Lee Whitney, allegedly ending it when he found her to be smoking cannabis in his house. He and Susan Toth (1960–2020) married in 1986, and they remained together, living in Sherman Oaks, until his death 32 years later. He referred to his home as "The Lost Aztec Temple of Mars". Susan died in August 2020, age 60.

Ellison was a longtime friend of actor Robert Culp, whom he had in mind when writing the script for The Outer Limits episode "Demon with a Glass Hand".

Ellison described himself as a Jewish atheist. In his writing, his work resembles traditional Jewish storytelling and works such as I'm Looking for Kadak (1974) and Mom (1976) include glossaries of Yiddish phrases.

In 1994, he had a heart attack and was hospitalized for quadruple coronary artery bypass surgery. From 2010, he received treatment for clinical depression.

In September 2007, Ellison attended the Midwestern debut of the documentary about his life, Dreams with Sharp Teeth, at the Cleveland Public Library in his hometown of Cleveland, Ohio. This would be Ellison's last public appearance in his hometown.

On about October 10, 2014, Ellison had a stroke. Although his speech and cognition were unimpaired, he suffered paralysis on his right side, for which he was expected to spend several weeks in physical therapy before being released from the hospital.

Ellison died in his sleep at his home in Los Angeles on the morning of June 28, 2018. His literary estate is executed by Babylon 5 creator J. Michael Straczynski.

== Pseudonyms ==
Ellison on occasion used the pseudonym Cordwainer Bird to alert members of the public to situations in which he felt his creative contribution to a project had been mangled by others, beyond repair, typically Hollywood producers or studios (see also Alan Smithee). The first such work to which he signed the name was "The Price of Doom", an episode of Voyage to the Bottom of the Sea (though it was misspelled as Cord Wainer Bird in the credits). An episode of Burke's Law ("Who Killed Alex Debbs?") credited to Ellison contains a character given this name, played by Sammy Davis Jr.

The "Cordwainer Bird" moniker is a tribute to fellow science fiction writer Paul M. A. Linebarger, better known by his pen name, Cordwainer Smith. The origin of the word "cordwainer" is shoemaker (from working with shell cordovan leather for shoes). The term used by Linebarger was meant to imply the industriousness of the pulp author. Ellison said, in interviews and in his writing, that his version of the pseudonym was meant to mean "a shoemaker for birds". Since he used the pseudonym mainly for works from which he wanted to distance himself, it may be understood to mean that "this work is for the birds" or that it is of as much use as shoes to a bird. Stephen King once said he thought that it meant that Ellison was giving people who mangled his work a literary version of "the bird" (given credence by Ellison himself in his own essay titled "Somehow, I Don't Think We're in Kansas, Toto", describing his experience with the Starlost television series).

The Bird moniker became a character in one of Ellison's own stories. In his 1978 book Strange Wine, Ellison explains the origins of the Bird and goes on to state that Philip José Farmer wrote Cordwainer into the Wold Newton family that the latter writer had developed. The thought of such a whimsical object lesson being related to such lights as Doc Savage, The Shadow, Tarzan, and all the other pulp heroes prompted Ellison to play with the concept, resulting in "The New York Review of Bird", in which an annoyed Bird uncovers the darker secrets of the New York literary establishment before beginning a pulpish slaughter of the same.

Other pseudonyms Ellison used during his career include Jay Charby, Sley Harson, Ellis Hart, Lee Archer, John Magnus, Paul Merchant, Pat Roeder, Ivar Jorgenson, Derry Tiger, Harlan Ellis and Jay Solo.

== Controversies and disputes ==
=== Temperament ===
Ellison had a reputation for being abrasive and argumentative. (Note: In his Introduction to "I Have No Mouth and I Must Scream", Theodore Sturgeon describes Ellison as "a man on the move, and he is moving fast. He is, on these pages and everywhere else he goes, colorful, intrusive, ABRASIVE ... and one hell of a writer.") He generally agreed with this assessment, and a dust jacket from one of his books described him as "possibly the most contentious person on Earth". Ellison filed numerous grievances and attempted lawsuits; during a contract dispute with Signet/NAL Books over binding cigarette ads into one of his paperbacks, he sent them dozens of bricks postage due, followed by a dead gopher. In an October 2017 piece in Wired, Ellison was dubbed "Sci-Fi's Most Controversial Figure".

According to Ellison, his impending trip to Israel was cancelled by its sponsor, the US Information Agency, after his irreverent comment on the Palestine–Israel situation to The Jerusalem Post.

At Stephen King's request, Ellison provided a description of himself and his writing in Danse Macabre (1981): "My work is foursquare for chaos. I spend my life personally, and my work professionally, keeping the soup boiling. Gadfly is what they call you when you are no longer dangerous; I much prefer troublemaker, malcontent, desperado. I see myself as a combination of Zorro and Jiminy Cricket. My stories go out from here and raise hell. From time to time some denigrator or critic with umbrage will say of my work, 'He only wrote that to shock.' I smile and nod. Precisely."

==== Health issues ====
Ellison suffered health issues often through his life, including severe depression toward the end, some of which he believed was Epstein–Barr virus and chronic fatigue syndrome, the latter two of which he believed he had had for 40–50 years. A few years before his death, J. Michael Straczynski convinced him to seek psychiatric diagnosis for the depression, resulting in a diagnosis and treatment of bipolar disorder; he commented, "Once you know he was bipolar, a lot of things that don't make sense suddenly make sense." The treatment "had a salutary effect for a while, until the stroke hit". Straczynski wrote a more detailed account of Ellison's struggles with mental illness, posthumously published in The Last Dangerous Visions.

=== Star Trek ===
Ellison repeatedly criticized how Star Trek creator and producer Gene Roddenberry (and others) rewrote his original script for the 1967 episode "The City on the Edge of Forever". Despite his objections, Ellison kept his own name on the shooting script instead of using "Cordwainer Bird" to indicate displeasure (see above).

Ellison's original script was first published in the 1976 anthology Six Science Fiction Plays, edited by Roger Elwood. The aired version was adapted for the Star Trek Fotonovel series in 1977.

In 1995, Borderlands Press published The City on the Edge of Forever, with nearly 300 pages comprising an essay by Ellison, four versions of the teleplay, and eight "Afterwords" contributed by other parties. He greatly expanded the introduction for the paperback edition, in which he explained what he called a "fatally inept" treatment.

Both versions of the script won awards: Ellison's original script won the 1968 Writers Guild Award for best episodic drama in television, while the shooting script won the 1968 Hugo Award for Best Dramatic Presentation.

On March 13, 2009, Ellison sued CBS Paramount Television, seeking payment of 25 percent of net receipts from merchandising, publishing, and other income from the episode since 1967; the suit also names the Writers Guild of America for allegedly failing to act on Ellison's behalf. On October 23, 2009, Variety magazine reported that a settlement had been reached.

=== Vietnam War opposition and AggieCon I ===
Ellison was among those who in 1968 signed an anti-Vietnam War advertisement in Galaxy Science Fiction. In 1969, Ellison was Guest of Honor at Texas A&M University's first science fiction convention, AggieCon, where he reportedly referred to the university's Corps of Cadets as "America's next generation of Nazis", inspired in part by the Vietnam War. Although the university was no longer solely a military school (from 1965), the student body was predominantly made up of cadet members. Between Ellison's anti-military remarks and a food fight that broke out in the ballroom of the hotel where the gathering was held (although, according to Ellison in 2000, the food fight actually started in a Denny's because the staff disappeared and they could not get their cheque), the school's administration almost refused to approve the science fiction convention the next year and no guest of honor was invited for the next two AggieCons. Ellison was subsequently invited back as Guest of Honor for AggieCon V (1974).

=== The Last Dangerous Visions ===
The Last Dangerous Visions (TLDV), the third volume of Ellison's anthology series, was originally announced for publication in 1973, but not published until October 2024, six years after Ellison died. Nearly 150 writers, many now also dead, had submitted works for the volume. In 1993, Ellison threatened to sue the New England Science Fiction Association (NESFA) for publishing "Himself in Anachron", a short story written by Cordwainer Smith and originally sold by his widow to Ellison for the anthology. The NESFA later reached an amicable settlement after it was revealed that the story contract had expired, allowing them to legally acquire it for publication.

British science fiction author Christopher Priest criticized Ellison's editorial practices in an article entitled "The Book on the Edge of Forever", later expanded into a book. Priest documented a half-dozen unfulfilled promises by Ellison to publish The Last Dangerous Visions within a year of the statement. Priest claims that he submitted a story at Ellison's request, which Ellison retained for several months until Priest withdrew the story and demanded that Ellison return the manuscript. Ellison was incensed by "The Book on the Edge of Forever" and, personally or by proxy, threatened Priest on numerous occasions after its publication.

In November 2020, the executor of the Harlan Ellison estate, J. Michael Straczynski, announced on Patreon that he was proceeding with the final preparations for the publication of TLDV with the proceeds to go to the Harlan and Susan Ellison Trust. The book was expected to be published in April 2021, as significant publisher interest was expressed.

Christopher Priest was unimpressed, saying that Straczynski was "in the same sort of unenviable position as Trump's caddie", but as an experienced professional would possibly work something out. He added, "I kind of lost interest in all that years ago. Ellison clearly did too, along with everyone else. (Although I gather he went on with his magical thinking if anyone asked when he was going to deliver.) Many of the stories were withdrawn, because Ellison acted like a dick. Of the ones that remain, most of them are by writers who are now deceased, so the rights have expired and the estates would have to be traced. A lot of the writers have disowned their stories as juvenilia, or outdated, or simply because Ellison was acting like a dick."

Despite early hopes of a 2021 release for The Last Dangerous Visions, 2021 came and went with no book. An October 2021 'progress report' from Straczynski revealed that the book was still in preparation. On May 2, 2022, Straczynski announced that the book would be published in 2023. On July 10, 2022, Straczynski announced on Twitter that The Last Dangerous Visions would be published on September 1, 2024, by Blackstone. The book was finally published on October 1, 2024, after half a century. The published volume contained stories by 24 authors; 7 of the stories in the book were actually commissioned and selected by Straczynski after Ellison's death.

=== I, Robot ===
Shortly after the release of Star Wars (1977), Ben Roberts contacted Ellison to develop a script based on Isaac Asimov's I, Robot short story collection for Warner Bros. In a meeting with the Head of Production at Warner Bros., Robert Shapiro, Ellison concluded that Shapiro was commenting on the script without having read it and accused him of having the "intellectual and cranial capacity of an artichoke". Shortly afterwards, Ellison was dropped from the project. Without Ellison, the film came to a dead end, because subsequent scripts were unsatisfactory to potential directors. After a change in studio heads, Warner allowed Ellison's script to be serialized in Asimov's Science Fiction magazine and published in book form. The 2004 film I, Robot, starring Will Smith, has no connection to Ellison's screenplay.

=== Allegations of assault on Charles Platt ===
In 1985, Ellison allegedly publicly assaulted author, journalist and computer programmer Charles Platt at the Nebula Awards banquet. Platt did not pursue legal action against Ellison and the two men later signed a "non-aggression pact", promising never to discuss the incident again nor to have any contact with one another. Platt claims that Ellison often publicly boasted about the incident.

=== Support of Ed Kramer ===
Ellison voiced strong support for Ed Kramer, founder of Dragon Con, after Kramer was accused of sexual abuse of children in 2000. Ellison and others disputed the evidence against Kramer, and also alleged Kramer was being held in jail in violation of his right to a speedy trial.

When writer Nancy A. Collins spoke up against Kramer, Ellison led a long-standing feud against her before Kramer entered an Alford plea in 2013.

=== 2006 Hugo Awards ceremony ===
Ellison was presented with a special committee award at the 2006 Hugo Awards ceremony. When Ellison got to the podium, presenter Connie Willis asked him "Are you going to be good?" When she asked the question a second time, Ellison put the microphone in his mouth, to the crowd's laughter. He then placed his hand on her breast during an embrace. Ellison subsequently complained that Willis refused to acknowledge his apology.

=== Lawsuit against Fantagraphics ===
On September 20, 2006, Ellison sued comic book and magazine publisher Fantagraphics, stating they had defamed him in their book Comics As Art (We Told You So). The book recounts the history of Fantagraphics and discussed a lawsuit that resulted from a 1980 Ellison interview with Fantagraphics' industry news magazine, The Comics Journal. In this interview Ellison referred to comic book writer Michael Fleisher, calling him "bugfuck" and "derange-o". Fleisher lost his libel suit against Ellison and Fantagraphics on December 9, 1986.

Ellison, after reading unpublished drafts of the book on Fantagraphics's website, believed that he had been defamed by several anecdotes related to this incident. He sued in the Superior Court for the State of California, in Santa Monica. Fantagraphics attempted to have the lawsuit dismissed. In their motion to dismiss, Fantagraphics argued that the statements were both their personal opinions and generally believed to be true anecdotes. On February 12, 2007, the presiding judge ruled against Fantagraphics' anti-SLAPP motion for dismissal. On June 29, 2007, Ellison claimed that the litigation had been resolved pending Fantagraphics' removal of all references to the case from their website. No money or apologies changed hands in the settlement as posted on August 17, 2007.

=== Copyright suits ===
In a 1980 lawsuit against ABC and Paramount Pictures, Ellison and Ben Bova claimed that the TV series Future Cop was based on their short story "Brillo", winning a $337,000 judgement.

Ellison alleged that James Cameron's film The Terminator drew from material from an episode of the original Outer Limits which Ellison had scripted, "Soldier" (1964). Hemdale, the production company and the distributor Orion Pictures, settled out of court for an undisclosed sum and added a credit to the film which acknowledged Ellison's work. Cameron objected to this acknowledgement and has since labeled Ellison's claim a "nuisance suit". Some accounts of the settlement state that another Outer Limits episode written by Ellison, "Demon with a Glass Hand" (1964), was also claimed to have been plagiarized by the film, but Ellison stated that "Terminator was not stolen from 'Demon with a Glass Hand', it was a ripoff of my OTHER Outer Limits script, 'Soldier'."

In 1983, Marvel Comics released The Incredible Hulk #286, entitled "Hero", written by Bill Mantlo. Three issues later, Marvel announced that Mantlo had adapted "Soldier" for use as a Hulk story, but that they had forgotten to credit Ellison until this was pointed out by readers. In actuality, then-Editor-in-Chief Jim Shooter signed off on the story, not having seen the Outer Limits episode it was based on and not realizing Mantlo copied it wholesale. The day the issue went on sale, he was contacted by an angry Ellison, who calmed down after Shooter admitted the error. Although he could have claimed hundreds of thousands of dollars in damages, Ellison requested only the same payment Mantlo had received for the story, proper credit as writer, and a lifetime subscription to everything Marvel published.

On April 24, 2000, Ellison sued Stephen Robertson for posting four stories to the usenet newsgroup alt.binaries.e-book without authorization. The other defendants were AOL and RemarQ, an internet service provider who owned servers hosting the newsgroup. Ellison alleged they had failed to halt copyright infringement in accordance with the "Notice and Takedown Procedure" outlined in the 1998 Digital Millennium Copyright Act. Robertson and RemarQ first settled with Ellison, and then AOL likewise settled with Ellison in June 2004, under conditions that were not made public. Since those settlements Ellison initiated legal action or takedown notices against more than 240 people who have allegedly distributed his writings on the Internet, saying, "If you put your hand in my pocket, you'll drag back six inches of bloody stump".

== Awards ==
Ellison won eight Hugo Awards, a shared award for the screenplay of A Boy and his Dog that he counted as "half a Hugo", and two special awards from annual World SF Conventions; four Nebula Awards of the Science Fiction and Fantasy Writers of America (SFWA); five Bram Stoker Awards of the Horror Writers Association (HWA); two Edgar Awards of the Mystery Writers of America; two World Fantasy Awards from annual conventions; and two Georges Méliès fantasy film awards. In 1987, Ellison was awarded the Inkpot Award.

In his 1981 book about the horror genre, Danse Macabre, Stephen King reviewed Ellison's collection Strange Wine and considered it one of the best horror books published between 1950 and 1980.

Ellison won the World Fantasy Award for Life Achievement in 1993. HWA gave him its Lifetime Achievement Award in 1996 and the World Horror Convention named him Grand Master in 2000. He was awarded the Gallun Award for Lifetime Achievement in Science Fiction from I-CON in 1997.

SFWA named him its 23rd Grand Master of fantasy and science fiction in 2006 and the Science Fiction Hall of Fame inducted him in 2011. That year he also received the fourth J. Lloyd Eaton Lifetime Achievement Award in Science Fiction, presented by the UCR Libraries at the 2011 Eaton SF Conference, "Global Science Fiction".

As of 2013, Ellison is the only three-time winner of the Nebula Award for Best Short Story. He won his other Nebula in the novella category.

He was awarded the Silver Pen for Journalism by International PEN, the international writers' union, in 1982. In 1990, Ellison was honored by International PEN for continuing commitment to artistic freedom and the battle against censorship. In 1998, he was awarded the "Defender of Liberty" award by the Comic Book Legal Defense Fund.

In March 1998, the National Women's Committee of Brandeis University honored him with their 1998 Words, Wit, Wisdom award.

Ellison was named 2002's winner of the Committee for the Scientific Investigation of Claims of the Paranormal's "Distinguished Skeptic Award", in recognition of his contributions to science and critical thinking. Ellison was presented with the award at the Skeptics Convention in Burbank, California, on June 22, 2002.

In December 2009, Ellison was nominated for a Grammy Award in the category Best Spoken Word Album For Children for his reading of Through the Looking-Glass And What Alice Found There for Blackstone Audio, Inc.

Academy of Science Fiction, Fantasy, and Horror Films (USA)

- Golden Scroll (Best Writing – Career 1976)

American Mystery Award

- "Soft Monkey" (best short story, 1988)

Asimov's Science Fiction Magazine Reader's Poll

- I, Robot screenplay (Special award, 1988)

Audie Awards

- The Titanic Disaster Hearings: The Official Transcript of the 1912 Senatorial Investigation (Best Multi-Voiced Presentation, 1999)
- City of Darkness (Best Solo Narration, 1999)
- The Dybbuk (Audiobook Adapted from Another Medium, 2000)

Best American Short Stories

- "The Man who Rowed Christopher Columbus Ashore" (included in the 1993 anthology)

The Bradbury Award

- Given by the Science Fiction and Fantasy Writers of America in 2000 to Harlan Ellison and Yuri Rasovsky for the radio series 2000X.

Bram Stoker Award

- The Essential Ellison (best collection, 1987)
- Harlan Ellison's Watching (best non-fiction, 1989 – tie)
- Mefisto in Onyx (best novella, 1993 – tie)
- "Chatting With Anubis" (best short story, 1995)
- Lifetime Achievement Award, 1995
- I Have No Mouth, and I Must Scream (best other media – audio, 1999)

British Fantasy Award

- "Jeffty Is Five" (best short story, 1979)

British Science Fiction Award

- Deathbird Stories (best collection, 1978)

Deathrealm Award

- Chatting with Anubis (best short fiction, 1996)

Edgar Allan Poe Award

- "The Whimper of Whipped Dogs" (best short story, 1974)
- "Soft Monkey" (best short story, 1988)

Georges Melies Award

- "Demon with a Glass Hand" (The Outer Limits) (Achievement in Science Fiction Television, 1972)
- "The City on the Edge of Forever" (Star Trek) (Achievement in Science Fiction Television, 1973)

Hugo Award

- ""Repent, Harlequin!" Said the Ticktockman" (best short fiction, 1966)
- "I Have No Mouth, and I Must Scream" (best short story, 1968)
- The City on the Edge of Forever (best dramatic presentation, 1968)
- Dangerous Visions (Worldcon special award, 1968)
- "The Beast That Shouted Love at the Heart of the World" (best short story, 1969)
- Again, Dangerous Visions (Worldcon special award for excellence in anthologizing, 1972)
- "The Deathbird" (best novelette, 1974)
- "Adrift Just Off the Islets of Langerhans: Latitude 38° 54' N, Longitude 77° 00' 13" W" (best novelette, 1975)
- A Boy and His Dog (film – best dramatic presentation, 1976. The Hugo was originally given to L.Q. Jones, the film's producer and screenwriter. After the ceremony, Ellison complained that as author of the original story upon which Jones's screenplay was based, he deserved to share in the award. No extra Hugo statuette was available, so to mollify Ellison, he received a Hugo base, which he called his "half Hugo".)
- "Jeffty Is Five" (best short story, 1978)
- "Paladin of the Lost Hour" (best novelette, 1986)

International Horror Guild Award

- 1994 Living Legend Award

Jupiter Award (Instructors of Science Fiction in Higher Education)

- "The Deathbird" (best short story, 1973)
- "Jeffty Is Five" (best short story, 1977)

Locus Poll Award

- The Region Between (best short fiction, 1971)
- Basilisk (best short fiction, 1973)
- Again, Dangerous Visions (best anthology, 1973)
- The Deathbird (best short fiction, 1974)
- Adrift Just Off the Islets of Langerhans: Latitude 38° 54' N, Longitude 77° 00' 13" W (best novelette, 1975)
- "Croatoan" (best short story, 1976)
- "Jeffty Is Five" (best short story, 1978) (best short story of all time, 1999 online poll)
- "Count the Clock that Tells the Time" (best short story, 1979)
- "Djinn, No Chaser" (best novelette, 1983)
- Sleepless Nights in the Procrustean Bed (introduction) (best related non-fiction, 1985)
- Medea: Harlan's World (best anthology, 1986)
- Paladin of the Lost Hour (best novelette, 1986)
- "With Virgil Oddum at the East Pole" (best short story, 1986)
- Angry Candy (best collection, 1989)
- The Function of Dream Sleep (best novelette, 1989)
- "Eidolons" (best short story, 1989)
- Mefisto in Onyx (best novella, 1994)
- Slippage (best collection, 1998)

Nebula Award

- ""Repent, Harlequin!" Said the Ticktockman" (best short story, 1966)
- A Boy and His Dog (best novella, 1970)
- "Jeffty Is Five" (best short story, 1978)
- Grand Master Award (at Tempe, Arizona, May 6, 2006)
- "How Interesting: A Tiny Man" (best short story, tied with Kij Johnson/"Ponies" 2011)

Prometheus Award

- ""Repent, Harlequin!" Said the Ticktockman" (2015 Hall of Fame Inductee)

Writers Guild of America

- Demon with a Glass Hand / The Outer Limits (Best Original Teleplay, 1965)
- The City on the Edge of Forever / Star Trek (Best Original Teleplay, 1967)
- Phoenix Without Ashes / The Starlost (Best Written Dramatic Episode, 1974)
- Paladin of the Lost Hour / The Twilight Zone (Best Anthology Episode/Single Program, 1987)

Writers Guild of Canada

- The Human Operators / The Outer Limits (2000)

World Fantasy Award

- Angry Candy (Best Collection, 1989)
- Lifetime Achievement Award, 1993

J. Lloyd Eaton Lifetime Achievement Award in Science Fiction

- 2011 recipient (Eaton Collection of Science Fiction and Fantasy, University of California–Riverside Libraries)

== Parodies and pastiches of Ellison ==
In the 1970s, artist and cartoonist Gordon Carleton wrote and drew a scripted slideshow called "City on the Edge of Whatever", a spoof of "The City on the Edge of Forever". Occasionally performed at Star Trek conventions, it features an irate writer named "Arlan Hellison" who screams at his producers, "Art defilers! Script assassins!"

Justice League of America #89 ("The Most Dangerous Dreams Of All") 1971, written by Mike Friedrich, is centered around a character named Harlequin Ellis. The character is smitten with Black Canary, and injects himself into Justice League adventures, taking on the role of different heroes in his attempts to woo her. Ellison himself had written several comic book scripts.

Ben Bova's novel The Starcrossed (1975), a roman à clef about Bova and Ellison's experience on The Starlost TV series, features a character, "Ron Gabriel", who is a pastiche of Ellison. Bova's novel is dedicated to Ellison's pseudonym "Cordwainer Bird", who was credited as series creator on The Starlost per Ellison's demand. In the novel, "Ron Gabriel" requires the fictional series producers to credit him under the pseudonym "Victor Lawrence Talbot Frankenstein".

In Murder at the ABA (1976) by Isaac Asimov, the protagonist, Darius Just, was based on Ellison, as stated by Asimov in footnotes to the book itself and in his autobiographical volume In Joy Still Felt.

Robert Silverberg named a character in his first novel, Revolt on Alpha C (1955), for Ellison, who was Silverberg's neighbor in New York City at the time he was writing the book. This was confirmed in a special edition on the occasion of Silverberg's 35th year in the business.

Sharyn McCrumb's mystery novel Bimbos of the Death Sun (1987) features a cantankerous antagonist-turned-murder victim based on Ellison. Fans of Ellison sent him copies of the book, and upon their meeting later that year at the Edgar Awards, Ellison told McCrumb he had read the book and thought it was good.

Ellison is a minor recurring character in the animated television series Scooby-Doo! Mystery Incorporated (2010–2013), voicing a fictionalized version of himself modeled on his appearance in the 1970s.

Ellison appeared as himself in an episode of The Simpsons ("Married to the Blob", 2014) in which he meets Bart and Milhouse, and parodies his contention that the film The Terminator used ideas from his stories.

Preceded by Dennis O'Neil	Daredevil writer 1984 (with Arthur Byron Cover)	Succeeded by Dennis O'Neil
