= List of The Twilight Zone (1985 TV series) episodes =

The Twilight Zone (1985) is the first of three revivals of Rod Serling's acclaimed 1959–1964 television series of the same name. It ran for two seasons on CBS before producing a final season for syndication.

The show was narrated by Charles Aidman (1985–1987) and Robin Ward (1988–1989). During the course of the series, 65 episodes of The Twilight Zone aired over three seasons.

== Series overview ==
Season	Episodes	Originally released		
Season	Episodes	First released	Last released	Network
1	24	September 27, 1985	April 11, 1986	CBS
2	11	September 27, 1986	July 17, 1987	CBS
3	30	September 24, 1988	April 15, 1989	Syndication

== Episodes ==
=== Season 1 (1985–86) ===
No. overall	No. in season	Title	Directed by	Written by	Original release date
1	1	"Shatterday"	Wes Craven	Based on the short story by : Harlan Ellison; Teleplay by : Alan Brennert	September 27, 1985
1	1	"A Little Peace and Quiet"	Wes Craven	James Crocker	September 27, 1985
Peter Novins (Bruce Willis) accidentally dials his own phone number, which is answered by his alter ego. Frazzled housewife Penny (Melinda Dillon) discovers a necklace that gives its owner the ability to freeze and unfreeze time. Also stars Judith Barsi.
2	2	"Wordplay"	Wes Craven	Rockne S. O'Bannon	October 4, 1985
2	2	"Dreams for Sale"	Tommy Lee Wallace	Joe Gannon	October 4, 1985
2	2	"Chameleon"	Wes Craven	James Crocker	October 4, 1985
Overworked businessman Bill Lowery (Robert Klein) gradually enters a parallel universe where people speak garbled English. Also stars Annie Potts with a cameo by Robert Downey Sr. At a picnic, a woman (Meg Foster) sees the same events repeating over and over again. A group of NASA technicians encounter a strange alien life form. Stars Terry O'Quinn, John Ashton, Ben Gazzara, and Lin Shaye.
3	3	"Healer"	Sigmund Neufeld	Alan Brennert (Note: Credited as Michael Bryant)	October 11, 1985
3	3	"Children's Zoo"	Robert Downey	Chris Hubbell & Gerrit Graham	October 11, 1985
3	3	"Kentucky Rye"	John Hancock	Richard Krzemien & Chip Duncan	October 11, 1985
Cat burglar Jackie Thompson (Eric Bogosian) profits from the healing powers of an Indian artifact he stole. Also stars Vincent Gardenia. A girl brings her bickering parents (Lorna Luft, Steven Keats) to a mysterious attraction called the Children's Zoo. Wes Craven appears in a cameo. Alcoholic Bob Spindler (Jeffrey DeMunn) is offered a once-in-a-lifetime chance to buy a roadside inn called the Kentucky Rye for a very low price. Also stars Arliss Howard, Philip Bruns, and Tim Russ.
4	4	"Little Boy Lost"	Tommy Lee Wallace	Lynn Barker	October 18, 1985
4	4	"Wish Bank"	Rick Friedberg	Michael Cassutt	October 18, 1985
4	4	"Nightcrawlers"	William Friedkin	Based on the short story by : Robert R. McCammon; Teleplay by : Philip DeGuere	October 18, 1985
Photographer Carol Shelton (Season Hubley) spends time with a little boy named Kenny (Scott Grimes) who seems oddly familiar. Upon finding a genie's lamp at a garage sale, Janice Hamill (Dee Wallace-Stone) tries to cash in three wishes at a most unusual bank. A veteran (Scott Paulin) of the Vietnam War shares his nightmares with the patrons of an all-night diner. Also stars Exene Cervenka (of band "X"), Sandy Martin and James Whitmore Jr.
5	5	"If She Dies"	John Hancock	David Bennett Carren	October 25, 1985
5	5	"Ye Gods"	Peter Medak	Anne Collins	October 25, 1985
The ghost of a little girl convinces Paul Marano (Tony Lo Bianco)—whose daughter is in a coma—to buy a bed from an orphanage. Also stars Andrea Barber, Jenny Lewis and Nan Martin. Loveless yuppie Todd Ettinger (David Dukes) finds himself up against the ancient gods when he is struck by Cupid (Robert Morse)'s arrow. Also stars Carolyn Seymour.
6	6	"Examination Day"	Paul Lynch	Based on the short story by : Henry Slesar; Teleplay by : Philip DeGuere	November 1, 1985
6	6	"A Message from Charity"	Paul Lynch	Based on the short story by : William M. Lee; Teleplay by : Alan Brennert	November 1, 1985
In a dystopian future, 12-year-old Dickie Jordan (David Mendenhall) is summoned for a mandatory intelligence test after turning of age. Teenager Peter Wood (Robert Duncan McNeill) with a fever finds himself in telepathic contact with a girl named Charity (Kerry Noonan) living in colonial New England. Also stars James Cromwell.
7	7	"Teacher's Aide"	B. W. L. Norton	Steven Barnes	November 8, 1985
7	7	"Paladin of the Lost Hour"	Gilbert Cates (Note: Credited as Alan Smithee)	Based on the short story "Paladin" by : Harlan Ellison; Teleplay by : Harlan Ellison	November 8, 1985
A teacher (Adrienne Barbeau) at a gang-filled school is possessed by a mysterious gargoyle. Mr. Gaspar (Danny Kaye), the protector of a magical timepiece, forms a friendship with Billy Kinetta (Glynn Turman), the man who saved him from being mugged.
8	8	"Act Break"	Theodore J. Flicker	Haskell Barkin	November 15, 1985
8	8	"The Burning Man"	J. D. Feigelson	Based on the short story by : Ray Bradbury; Teleplay by : J. D. Feigelson	November 15, 1985
8	8	"Dealer's Choice"	Wes Craven	Donald Todd	November 15, 1985
Struggling playwright Maury Winkler (James Coco) uses an ancient relic to make a single wish. Also stars Bob Dishy. A woman (Piper Laurie) and her nephew (Andre Gower) pick up a crazed hitchhiker (Roberts Blossom) who warns of supernatural evils ahead. With Danny Cooksey. A group of friends (Barney Martin, Garrett Morris, M. Emmet Walsh and Morgan Freeman) playing poker suspect that their new guest (Dan Hedaya) is the Devil.
9	9	"Dead Woman's Shoes"	Peter Medak	Based on the story and teleplay by : Charles Beaumont; Teleplay by : Lynn Barker	November 22, 1985
9	9	"Wong's Lost and Found Emporium"	Paul Lynch	Based on the story by : William F. Wu; Teleplay by : Alan Brennert	November 22, 1985
In a remake of the original Twilight Zone episode "Dead Man's Shoes", shy thrift store employee Maddie Duncan (Helen Mirren) tries on a pair of high heels that make her assertive, self-confident—and vengeful. Also stars Jeffrey Tambor and Theresa Saldana, with Robert Pastorelli, Tyra Ferrell and Nana Visitor in small roles. Cynical man David Wong (Brian Tochi) explores a supernatural warehouse called "The Lost and Found Emporium", where everything that is lost in the world ends up—even love and time.
10	10	"The Shadow Man"	Joe Dante	Rockne S. O'Bannon	November 29, 1985
10	10	"The Uncle Devil Show"	David Steinberg	Donald Todd	November 29, 1985
10	10	"Opening Day"	John Milius	Gerrit Graham & Chris Hubbell	November 29, 1985
The Shadow Man (Jeff Calhoun), a mysterious entity made of darkness, defends young highschooler Danny Hayes (Jonathan Ward) in exchange for being allowed to stay under his bed. Cameo by Amy O'Neill. A boy learns strange magic tricks from a bizarre kids' show, unbeknownst to his oblivious parents. Carl Wilkerson (Jeffrey Jones) is targeted for murder on the opening day of duck hunting season by his wife's lover—who is also his best friend. Also stars Martin Kove.
11	11	"The Beacon"	Gerd Oswald	Martin Pasko & Rebecca Parr	December 6, 1985
11	11	"One Life, Furnished in Early Poverty"	Don Carlos Dunaway	From a short story by : Harlan Ellison; Teleplay by : Alan Brennert	December 6, 1985
Young doctor Dennis Barrows (Charles Martin Smith) stumbles into a strange town where the citizens fear and worship a lighthouse. Also stars Martin Landau and Giovanni Ribisi. Gus Rosenthal (Peter Riegert) returns to his childhood home, and finds himself transported to his past. Also stars Jack Kehoe.
12	12	"Her Pilgrim Soul"	Wes Craven	Alan Brennert	December 13, 1985
12	12	"I of Newton"	Kenneth Gilbert	Based on the short story by : Joe Haldeman; Teleplay by : Alan Brennert	December 13, 1985
Two scientists (Kristoffer Tabori, Gary Cole) create a holographic projector, which shows something completely unexpected—the reincarnated soul of a young girl (Danica McKellar, then Anne Twomey). A professor (Sherman Hemsley) attempting to solve a difficult math problem idly comments that he would "sell his soul" to get it right. A demon (Ron Glass) shows up to collect, resulting in a battle of wits.
13	13	"Night of the Meek"	Martha Coolidge	Based on the story and teleplay by : Rod Serling; Teleplay by : Rockne S. O'Bannon	December 20, 1985
13	13	"But Can She Type?"	Shelley Levinson	Martin Pasko & Rebecca Parr	December 20, 1985
13	13	"The Star"	Gerd Oswald	Based on the short story by : Arthur C. Clarke; Teleplay by : Alan Brennert	December 20, 1985
In this update of the original series episode "The Night of the Meek", drunk, out-of-work department store Santa Henry Corwin (Richard Mulligan) finds a magic gift-giving bag and becomes a real-life Santa Claus. Also stars William Atherton, Jeff Kober, and Larenz Tate. Overworked, underappreciated secretary Karen Billings (Pam Dawber) is sent by a malfunctioning Xerox machine into a parallel reality where secretaries are honored and revered. Cameo by Jonathan Frakes. In an adaptation of the 1956 short story, while on an interstellar journey, an astrophysicist (Donald Moffat) and a priest (Fritz Weaver) learn they have discovered a long-dead world that has been emitting a signal for eons—and how its demise affected human history.
14	14	"Still Life"	Peter Medak	Gerrit Graham & Chris Hubbell	January 3, 1986
14	14	"The Little People of Killany Woods"	J. D. Feigelson	J. D. Feigelson	January 3, 1986
14	14	"The Misfortune Cookie"	Allan Arkush	Based on the short story by : Charles E. Fritch; Teleplay by : Rockne S. O'Bannon (Note: Credited as Steven Rae)	January 3, 1986
Professional photographer Dan Arnold (Robert Carradine) discovers an old camera containing mysterious photos of a long-ago expedition. But developing the photos brings its subjects into the world. Also stars John Carradine. A story-telling town moocher (Hamilton Camp) has an encounter with "little people". Snobby food critic Harry Folger (Elliott Gould) receives fortune cookie messages that come true.
15	15	"Monsters!"	B. W. L. Norton	Robert Crais	January 24, 1986
15	15	"A Small Talent for War"	Claudia Weill	Carter Scholz & Alan Brennert	January 24, 1986
15	15	"A Matter of Minutes"	Sheldon Larry	Suggested by the short story "Yesterday Was Monday" by : Theodore Sturgeon; Teleplay by : Rockne S. O'Bannon	January 24, 1986
Young horror movie enthusiast Toby (Oliver Robins) finds that his new neighbor (Ralph Bellamy) is a vampire, who in turn shows him that everything he knows about vampires is wrong. An alien race that claims to have created mankind returns to judge them. Starring John Glover and Peter Michael Goetz. A married couple (Adam Arkin, Karen Austin) awakens outside the normal flow of time and gets a glimpse of how reality works. Also stars Adolph Caesar.
16	16	"The Elevator"	R. L. Thomas	Ray Bradbury	January 31, 1986
16	16	"To See the Invisible Man"	Noel Black	Based on the short story by : Robert Silverberg; Teleplay by : Steven Barnes	January 31, 1986
16	16	"Tooth and Consequences"	Robert Downey Sr.	Haskell Barkin	January 31, 1986
Two brothers (Stephen Geoffreys, Robert Prescott) searching for their father discover a factory full of giant animal bodies. In a future society, uncaring man Mitchell Chaplin (Cotter Smith) is sentenced to a year of social isolation. The Tooth Fairy (Kenneth Mars) gives a dentist (David Birney) what he wishes for.
17	17	"Welcome to Winfield"	Bruce Bilson	Les Enloe	February 7, 1986
17	17	"Quarantine"	Martha Coolidge	Story by : Philip DeGuere and Steven Bochco; Teleplay by : Alan Brennert	February 7, 1986
Two people fleeing an agent of Death (Gerrit Graham) end up in an old west town that has avoided death for decades. Also stars Henry Gibson and Elisha Cook Jr.. Weapons designer Matthew Forman (Scott Wilson) is cryogenically frozen and awakened three centuries later, where he finds a post-war human race that has grown telepathic powers and rejected technology. Also stars Tess Harper.
18	18	"Gramma"	Bradford May	Based on the short story by : Stephen King; Teleplay by : Harlan Ellison	February 14, 1986
18	18	"Personal Demons"	Peter Medak	Rockne S. O'Bannon	February 14, 1986
18	18	"Cold Reading"	Gus Trikonis	Martin Pasko & Rebecca Parr	February 14, 1986
Young Georgie (Barret Oliver) is afraid of his ailing grandmother. His mother (Darlanne Fluegel) leaves him alone to take care of her. Cameo voice by (Piper Laurie) as Gramma. Veteran television screenwriter Rockne S. O'Bannon (Martin Balsam) suffers from diminutive creatures that plague his daily life. Also stars Clive Revill. The producer of a 1940s radio show (Dick Shawn), a stickler for realistic sound effects, inadvertently causes the natural sources of the sounds to materialize in the studio. Also starring Larry Poindexter.
19	19	"The Leprechaun-Artist"	Tommy Lee Wallace	Story by : James Crocker; Teleplay by : Tommy Lee Wallace	February 21, 1986
19	19	"Dead Run"	Paul Tucker	Based on the short story by : Greg Bear; Teleplay by : Alan Brennert	February 21, 1986
A vacationing leprechaun (Cork Hubbert) is forced to grant wishes, which come with unintended consequences, to the three boys who captured him. With Danny Nucci. Truck driver Johnny Davis (Steve Railsback) accepts the job of delivering souls to Hell, and finds Hell is not what he expected. Also stars Barry Corbin, John de Lancie, and Brent Spiner.
20	20	"Profile in Silver"	John Hancock	J. Neil Schulman	March 7, 1986
20	20	"Button, Button"	Peter Medak	Based on the short story by : Richard Matheson; Teleplay by : Richard Matheson (Note: Credited as Logan Swanson)	March 7, 1986
History professor Dr. Joseph Fitzgerald (Lane Smith) is sent back in time to observe the assassination of President John F. Kennedy, but he botches the job in the worst possible way. Also stars Barbara Baxley, Louis Giambalvo, and Jerry Hardin. A mysterious stranger (Basil Hoffman) gives down-and-out couple Norma and Arthur Lewis (Mare Winningham, Brad Davis) a box with a button on it. He says that if they press the button, they will receive $200,000 and someone they do not know will die.
21	21	"Need to Know"	Paul Lynch	Based on the short story by : Sidney Sheldon; Teleplay by : Mary Sheldon	March 21, 1986
21	21	"Red Snow"	Jeannot Szwarc	Michael Cassutt	March 21, 1986
Government scientist Edward Sayers (William Petersen) is sent to a small town to investigate a bizarre outbreak of insanity. Also stars Frances McDormand. KGB Colonel Ilyanov (George Dzundza) is sent to a Siberian town to investigate the deaths of the local Communist Party officials. Also stars Victoria Tennant.
22	22	"Take My Life...Please!"	Gus Trikonis	Gordon Mitchell	March 28, 1986
22	22	"Devil's Alphabet"	Ben Bolt	Based on the short story by : Arthur Gray; Teleplay by : Robert Hunter	March 28, 1986
22	22	"The Library"	John Hancock	Anne Collins	March 28, 1986
Comedian Billy Diamond (Tim Thomerson) must perform an act that will decide his fate in the afterlife. Also stars Xander Berkeley and Ray Buktenica. The members of a poetry society find themselves haunted by an oath they took as young men. Features an ensemble cast including Ben Cross, Ethan Phillips, and Wayne Alexander. Writer Ellen Pendleton (Frances Conroy) is hired to work in a private library and where the books document the lives of everyone alive, updated instantly. Also stars Uta Hagen and Lori Petty.
23	23	"Shadow Play"	Paul Lynch	Based on the story and teleplay by : Charles Beaumont; Teleplay by : James Crocker	April 4, 1986
23	23	"Grace Note"	Peter Medak	Patrice Messina	April 4, 1986
A remake of the 1961 Twilight Zone episode. Sentenced to death, Adam Grant (Peter Coyote) desperately tries to convince his prosecutor that their reality is actually a recurring nightmare of his—and everyone will cease to exist once he is executed at midnight. Also stars William Schallert. Opera singer Rosemary Miletti (Julia Migenes) gains a glimpse of her future with a wish from her dying sister.
24	24	"A Day in Beaumont"	Philip DeGuere	David Gerrold	April 11, 1986
24	24	"The Last Defender of Camelot"	Jeannot Szwarc	Based on a story by : Roger Zelazny; Teleplay by : George R. R. Martin	April 11, 1986
After witnessing the landing of a flying saucer, a young couple (Victor Garber, Stacey Nelkin) find themselves in the midst of an alien invasion. In modern-day England, the last of King Arthur's knights (Richard Kiley) teams with Morgan le Fay (Jenny Agutter) to stop the return of Merlin (Norman Lloyd). Also stars John Cameron Mitchell.

=== Season 2 (1986–87) ===
No. overall	No. in season	Title	Directed by	Written by	Original release date
25	1	"The Once and Future King"	Jim McBride	Story by : Bryce Maritano; Teleplay by : George R. R. Martin	September 27, 1986
25	1	"A Saucer of Loneliness"	John Hancock	Based on the short story by : Theodore Sturgeon; Teleplay by : David Gerrold	September 27, 1986
Elvis impersonator Gary Pitkin (Jeff Yagher) travels back in time and meets the real Elvis Presley. Lonely waitress Margaret (Shelley Duvall) encounters a mysterious saucer with a message only for her. Also stars Nan Martin and Richard Libertini.
26	2	"What Are Friends For?"	Gus Trikonis	J. Michael Straczynski	October 4, 1986
26	2	"Aqua Vita"	Paul Tucker	Jeremy Bertrand Finch & Paul Chitlik	October 4, 1986
A child's (Fred Savage) imaginary friend (Lukas Haas) turns out to be his father's imaginary friend as well. Also stars Tom Skerritt. Christine (Mimi Kennedy), an aging news anchor, finds a method for youth at a steep price. Also stars Christopher McDonald.
27	3	"The Storyteller"	Paul Lynch	Rockne S. O'Bannon	October 11, 1986
27	3	"Nightsong"	Bradford May	Michael Reaves	October 11, 1986
Young teacher Dorothy Livingston (Glynnis O'Connor) finds that the secret to immortality resides in stories. Also stars David Faustino. DJ Andrea Fields (Lisa Eilbacher) must cope with the return of her lover after a five-year disappearance.
28	4	"The After Hours"	Bruce Malmuth	Based on the story and teleplay by : Rod Serling; Teleplay by : Rockne S. O'Bannon	October 18, 1986
28	4	"Lost and Found"	Gus Trikonis	Based on the short story by : Phyllis Eisenstein; Teleplay by : George R. R. Martin	October 18, 1986
28	4	"The World Next Door"	Paul Lynch	Lan O'Kun	October 18, 1986
In this remake of the 1960 Twilight Zone episode, a woman (Terry Farrell) is trapped in a mall after hours with living mannequins. Also stars Ann Wedgeworth. A student's (Akosua Busia) possessions mysteriously vanish. A door in the basement leads to a parallel world, and both of a man's counterparts find the grass greener on the other side. Stars George Wendt, Bernadette Birkett and Jeffrey Tambor. Note: CBS Home Video split this installment into two half-hour shows, the first two stories in the first half and the last story in the second. As a result, "Lost and Found" is cut from eight minutes to just five. Starting with the next episode, CBS reduced the show to 30 minutes.
29	5	"The Toys of Caliban"	Thomas J. Wright	Story by : Terry Matz; Teleplay by : George R. R. Martin	December 4, 1986
A mentally handicapped child (David Greenlee) has immense, dangerous powers which his parents struggle to prevent his misusing. Also stars Richard Mulligan and Anne Haney.
30	6	"The Convict's Piano"	Thomas J. Wright	Story by : James Crocker; Teleplay by : Patrice Messina	December 11, 1986
A wrongfully convicted prisoner (Joe Penny) discovers an old piano in his prison with special powers. Also stars Norman Fell.
31	7	"The Road Less Traveled"	Wes Craven	George R. R. Martin	December 18, 1986
A draft-dodger (Cliff DeYoung) is haunted by the specter of a familiar-looking man in a wheelchair. Note: CBS broadcasts two half-hour shows back-to-back as an hour for the rest of the season.
32	8	"The Card"	Bradford May	Michael Cassutt	February 21, 1987
32	8	"The Junction"	Bill Duke	Virginia Aldridge	February 21, 1987
A woman (Susan Blakely) with out-of-control spending habits finds her new credit card comes with unexpected penalties. Also stars William Atherton. A miner (William Allen Young) who has been cheating on his wife is trapped by a cave-in with a miner from 1912 (Chris Mulkey).
33	9	"Joy Ride"	Gil Bettman	Cal Willingham	May 21, 1987
33	9	"Private Channel"	Peter Medak	Edward Redlich	May 21, 1987
33	9	"Shelter Skelter"	Martha Coolidge	Story by : Ron Cobb; Teleplay by : Ron Cobb and Robin Love	May 21, 1987
Four teens (Rob Knepper, Brooke McCarter, Heidi Kozak and Tamara Mark) take a recently deceased man's classic car for a joyride. The driver (Knepper) acts increasingly irrationally during the ride. After accidentally dropping his portable stereo in an airplane lavatory, a young man (Scott Coffey) discovers that it allows him to hear other people's thoughts. A survivalist (Joe Mantegna) and his friend (Jon Gries) live in his shelter after a nuclear bomb detonation. Also stars Joan Allen and Danica McKellar.
34	10	"Time and Teresa Golowitz"	Shelley Levinson	Based on a short story by : Parke Godwin; Teleplay by : Alan Brennert	July 10, 1987
34	10	"Voices in the Earth"	Curtis Harrington	Alan Brennert	July 10, 1987
A Broadway composer (Paul Sand) accepts an offer from the devil (Gene Barry) and returns to his high school years to see his crush again. While there he sees an opportunity to prevent a classmate's suicide. Also stars Grant Heslov and Wallace Langham. People return to a barren Earth to find that not everything had left when they thought it did. Stars Martin Balsam and Jenny Agutter.
35	11	"Song of the Younger World"	Noel Black	Anthony & Nancy Lawrence	July 17, 1987
35	11	"The Girl I Married"	Philip DeGuere	J. M. DeMatteis	July 17, 1987
In 1916, a girl (Jennifer Rubin) and a young man (Peter Kowanko) from a reformatory for wayward boys fall in love and try to get away from her disapproving father, the superintendent (Roberts Blossom). Also stars Paul Benedict. An attorney (James Whitmore Jr.) pines after the way his wife (Linda Kelsey) was in their younger years, only to encounter that younger woman in the present.

=== Season 3 (1988–89) ===
No. overall	No. in season	Title	Directed by	Written by	Original release date
36	1	"The Curious Case of Edgar Witherspoon"	René Bonnière	Story by : Haskell Barkin and J. Michael Straczynski; Teleplay by : Haskell Barkin	September 24, 1988
Edgar Witherspoon (Harry Morgan) is ordered by a mysterious voice to collect junk in his apartment to keep the world in balance. Also stars Cedric Smith.
37	2	"Extra Innings"	Doug Jackson	Tom Palmer	October 1, 1988
Ex-baseball player Ed Hamner (Marc Singer), lame from an injury and forced to retire early, is given a baseball card from the early 1900s that transports Hamner into the life of that player.
38	3	"The Crossing"	Paul Lynch	Ralph Phillips	October 8, 1988
A stressed-out priest (Ted Shackelford) is haunted by the sight of a station wagon with a woman inside that keeps crashing.
39	4	"The Hunters"	Paul Lynch	Paul Chitlik & Jeremy Bertrand Finch	October 15, 1988
An archeologist (Louise Fletcher) studies prehistoric paintings in a newly discovered cave. The project takes a dark turn after the carcasses of livestock from nearby farms begin turning up near the cave. Also stars Michael Hogan.
40	5	"Dream Me a Life"	Allan King	J. Michael Straczynski	October 22, 1988
A man (Eddie Albert) in a retirement home is trapped in the dreams of a catatonic widow. Also stars Frances Hyland.
41	6	"Memories"	Richard Bugajski	Bob Underwood	October 29, 1988
A specialist in past life regression (Barbara Stock) enters an alternate reality where everyone already remembers all their past lives.
42	7	"The Hellgramite Method"	Gilbert Shilton	William Selby	November 5, 1988
An alcoholic (Timothy Bottoms) goes through an extremely painful and potentially deadly cure for his drinking problem. Also stars Julie Khaner.
43	8	"Our Selena Is Dying"	Bruce Pittman	Story by : Rod Serling; Teleplay by : J. Michael Straczynski	November 12, 1988
A young woman (Terri Garber) has her youth sucked out of her by her dying aunt.
44	9	"The Call"	Gilbert Shilton	J. Michael Straczynski	November 19, 1988
A lonely man (William Sanderson) dials a wrong number and develops a close relationship with the woman on the other end. When she refuses to meet him, he investigates and discovers she is a statue.
45	10	"The Trance"	Randy Bradshaw	Jeff Stuart and J. Michael Straczynski	November 26, 1988
A scam artist (Peter Scolari) purports to channel the spirit of Delos, an inhabitant of Atlantis. He begins involuntarily channeling a real spirit, one with a habit of insulting people.
46	11	"Acts of Terror"	Brad Turner	J. Michael Straczynski	December 3, 1988
A battered wife (Melanie Mayron) finds the strength to fight her abusive husband by looking at a statuette of a Doberman Pinscher. Also stars Kenneth Welsh.
47	12	"20/20 Vision"	Jim Purdy	Robert Walden	December 10, 1988
Bank loan officer Warren Cribbens (Michael Moriarty) cracks his eyeglasses and discovers he can see the future through them, showing that his efforts to help a farmer avoid foreclosure are doomed to fail.
48	13	"There Was an Old Woman"	Otta Hanus	Tom J. Astle	December 17, 1988
A writer of children's books (Colleen Dewhurst) autographs a book for a sick young fan. Later, she starts hearing the sound of children in her house.
49	14	"The Trunk"	Steve DiMarco	Paul Chitlik & Jeremy Bertrand Finch	December 24, 1988
A motel proprietor (Bud Cort) discovers an empty trunk that grants wishes. He uses it for popularity, but at a party he discovers who his true friends are: no one.
50	15	"Appointment on Route 17"	René Bonnière	Haskell Barkin	December 31, 1988
After receiving a heart transplant, a man (Paul Le Mat) finds his personality has changed, incorporating a strange attraction to a waitress at a road diner.
51	16	"The Cold Equations"	Martin Lavut	Based on a story by : Tom Godwin; Teleplay by : Alan Brennert	January 7, 1989
A cargo pilot (Terence Knox) on the frontiers of space finds an innocent stowaway on his ship, who the ship's fuel supply cannot support.
52	17	"Stranger in Possum Meadows"	Sturla Gunnarsson	Paul Chitlik & Jeremy Bertrand Finch	January 14, 1989
A young boy playing in a field meets a man (Steve Kanaly) who is really an alien collecting specimens to bring back to his planet.
53	18	"Street of Shadows"	Richard Bugajski	Michael Reaves	January 21, 1989
While breaking into a house, an unemployed homeless man (Charles Haid) switches bodies with the house's owner. Also stars Lisa Jakub.
54	19	"Something in the Walls"	Allan Kroeker	J. Michael Straczynski	January 28, 1989
A doctor (Damir Andrei) at a sanitarium has a patient (Deborah Raffin) who is terribly frightened of patterns on clothing and furniture.
55	20	"A Game of Pool"	Randy Bradshaw	George Clayton Johnson	February 4, 1989
In this remake of the 1961 Twilight Zone episode, a pool player (Esai Morales) challenges the long-dead legend, Fats Brown (Maury Chaykin), who returns from the afterlife to give him a high-stakes game. This version of the story uses George Clayton Johnson's original 1961 script, with a notably different ending (which Rod Serling revised for the 1961 filmed version).
56	21	"Room 2426"	Ryszard Bugajski	Jeremy Bertrand Finch & Paul Chitlik	February 11, 1989
Scientist Martin Decker (Dean Stockwell) is confined and interrogated by government agents for the location of his notes. Escape for Martin comes from the mind.
57	22	"The Mind of Simon Foster"	Doug Jackson	J. Michael Straczynski	February 18, 1989
To make ends meet, Simon Foster (Bruce Weitz) sells his memories to a pawn shop broker.
58	23	"The Wall"	Atom Egoyan	J. Michael Straczynski	February 25, 1989
A U.S. military experiment opens a portal to an unknown place. The Army calls upon a career soldier (John Beck) to investigate. He finds an idyllic world, and seemingly no way to get back.
59	24	"Cat and Mouse"	Eric Till	Christy Marx	March 4, 1989
A shy woman (Pamela Bellwood) becomes the lover of a cursed Casanova (Page Fletcher) who turns into a cat during the daytime.
60	25	"Rendezvous in a Dark Place"	René Bonnière	J. Michael Straczynski	March 11, 1989
An old woman (Janet Leigh) with an obsession with death finds an injured thief in her home. When Death (Stephen McHattie) arrives to collect him, she tries to persuade him to take her instead.
61	26	"Many, Many Monkeys"	Richard Bugajski	William Froug	March 18, 1989
An epidemic causes blindness. A nurse begins to believe that the disease is divine retribution. Stars Karen Valentine, Jackie Burroughs and Ken Pogue.
62	27	"Love Is Blind"	Gilbert Shilton	Cal Willingham	March 25, 1989
A man (Ben Murphy) plotting to murder his wife's lover meets a blind singer who knows all about his plan.
63	28	"Crazy as a Soup Sandwich"	Paul Lynch	Harlan Ellison	April 1, 1989
A man (Wayne Robson) sells his soul to a demon for some racing tips. After being terrified by the demon he goes for help from the criminal boss (Tony Franciosa) he borrowed the track money from.
64	29	"Special Service"	Randy Bradshaw	J. Michael Straczynski	April 8, 1989
A man (David Naughton) finds that his life has been on TV for the past five years.
65	30	"Father and Son Game"	Randy Bradshaw	Jeremy Bertrand Finch & Paul Chitlik	April 15, 1989
Upon brain death, a 79-year-old man (Ed Marinaro) has his brain data transplanted into an experimental robot brain. His son (Eugene Robert Glazer) considers this an abomination and tries to have his father declared legally dead.
