= 1991 in science fiction =

The year 1991 was marked, in science fiction, by the following:

== Events ==
- The first Ignotus Prizes, for Spanish science fiction and fantasy, are awarded
- The 49th annual Worldcon, Chicon V, was held in Chicago, USA

== Births and deaths ==
=== Deaths ===
- Gene Roddenberry
- Arkady Strugatsky

== Literary releases ==
=== Novels ===
- Gojiro, by Marc Jacobson
- He, She and It, by Marge Piercy
- Sarah Canary, by Karen Joy Fowler
- Synners, by Pat Cadigan
- Xenocide, by Orson Scott Card

== Movies ==
- The Rocketeer, dir. by Joe Johnston
- Roujin Z, dir. by Hiroyuki Kitakubo
- Terminator 2: Judgment Day, dir. by James Cameron

== Television ==
- Aeon Flux

== Video games ==
- Another World
- Time Traveller

== Awards ==
=== Hugos ===
- Best novel: The Vor Game, by Lois McMaster Bujold
- Best novella: The Hemingway Hoax, by Joe Haldeman
- Best novelette: "The Manamouki", by Mike Resnick
- Best short story: "Bears Discover Fire", by Terry Bisson
- Best related work: How to Write Science Fiction and Fantasy, by Orson Scott Card
- Best dramatic presentation: Edward Scissorhands, dir. by Tim Burton; screenplay by Caroline Thompson; story by Tim Burton and Caroline Thompson
- Best professional editor: Gardner Dozois
- Best professional artist: Michael Whelan
- Best Semiprozine: Locus, ed. by Charles N. Brown
- Best fanzine: Lan's Lantern, ed. by George "Lan" Laskowski
- Best fan writer: Dave Langford
- Best fan artist: Teddy Harvia

=== Nebulas ===
- Best novel: Stations of the Tide, by Michael Swanwick
- Best novella: Beggars in Spain, by Nancy Kress
- Best novelette: "Guide Dog" by Mike Conner
- Best short story: "Ma Qui" by Alan Brennert

=== Other awards ===
- BSFA Award for Best Novel: The Fall of Hyperion, by Dan Simmons
- Locus Award for Best Science Fiction Novel: The Fall of Hyperion, by Dan Simmons
- Saturn Award for Best Science Fiction Film: Terminator 2: Judgment Day
