= Special service =

Special service may refer to:

== Awards ==
- Special Service Medal (disambiguation), an award by several countries

== Organizations ==
- Secret service ― the term "special service" is typically used in Slavic countries
- Special forces, a group of highly skilled soldiers performing duties that conventional units can not perform
  - Special Service Brigade, a unit of the British Army
  - Special Service Group, a unit of the Pakistan Army
  - Special Service Group (Navy), a unit of the Pakistan Navy
  - Special Service Wing, a unit of the Pakistan Air Force
  - Special Service Squadron, a former unit of the United States Navy
  - Special Service Squadron, a former unit of the Royal Navy (UK) which undertook the 1923 Cruise of the Special Service Squadron
- Special Services (entertainment), a former division of the United States Army that provided entertainment for troops

== Others ==
- Special service, a radiocommunication service in accordance with ITU Radio Regulations article 1.60
- For Special Services, a 1982 James Bond novel
- "Special Service", a 1989 The Twilight Zone episode
