= Michael Fox (American actor) =

American actor (1921–1996)

- Michael Fox on Perry Mason 1957
- Born: Myron Melvin Fox; February 27, 1921; Yonkers, New York, U.S.
- Died: June 1, 1996 (aged 75); Woodland Hills, Los Angeles, California, U.S.
- Resting place: Westwood Village Memorial Park Cemetery
- Years active: 1952–1995
- Spouse: Hannah Fox (m. 1947)
- Children: 2

Michael Fox (born Myron Melvin Fox, February 27, 1921 – June 1, 1996) was an American character actor who appeared in numerous films and television shows. Some of his most famous recurring roles were as various autopsy physicians in Perry Mason, as Coroner George McLeod in Burke's Law, as Amos Fedders in Falcon Crest, and as Saul Feinberg in The Bold and the Beautiful.

== Early life ==
Fox was born in Yonkers, New York, to Jacob Fox, an Austrian-born salesman, and his wife, the former Josephine Berkowitz. He was the youngest of four children, and the third son.

== Career ==
Michael Fox began acting in stage plays in southern California circa 1945. Through his stage endeavors, Fox met Harry Sauber who introduced him to Sam Katzman.

Two of his regular TV roles were as the coroner in the courtroom drama Perry Mason, and as Saul Feinberg on the CBS soap opera The Bold and the Beautiful from 1989 to 1996.

Among his earlier television work was the penultimate episode of Adventures of Superman, as the ringleader of a criminal gang that tried to conduct a Perils of Pauline–style series of murder attempts on the show's various protagonists. He also appeared in several episodes on the 1955–1957 television series Science Fiction Theatre.

== The Dr. Fox effect ==
Fox also made an important contribution to the scholarly field of education, as the actor who portrayed "Dr. Myron L. Fox" in a study that would give rise to the Dr. Fox effect, and also participated in the generation of additional materials in at least one follow-up study. In the initial demonstration of this effect, Fox delivered an engaging and expressive lecture that contained no meaningful content, and yet, the audience rated Fox just as highly as a genuine professor's lecture. The Dr. Fox effect has been often cited as a critique of the validity of student evaluations of teaching.

== Personal life and death ==
He was married to Hannah, an actress he met while acting in the stage play The Dybbuk. Borrowing a car from Dorothy Gish, Fox drove Hannah to a judge and married her between the matinee and evening performances of The Story of Mary Surratt.

Fox died of pneumonia June 1, 1996, in Woodland Hills, Los Angeles, California. His death was written into The Bold and the Beautiful.

== Acting roles ==
=== Non-recurring or recurring multiple roles in television series ===
- Science Fiction Theatre
  Beyond (1955) - Radar Man
  The Brain of John Emerson (1955) - Dr. Franklin
  The Frozen Sound (1955) - Dr. Gordine
  The Flicker (1956) - Dr. James Kincaid
  The Missing Waveband (1956) - Dr. Maxwell
  Jupitron (1956) - Dr. Norstad
  Signals from the Moon (1956) - Dr. Edwards
- The Ford Television Theatre
  The Payoff (1956) - Lieutenant Bernard Shuman
  Catch at Straws (1956) - Jed Hartan
  Front Page Father (1956) - Malcolm Slade
  Miller's Millions (1957) - Judge Patterson
- Perry Mason -
  The Case of the Runaway Corpse (1957) - Dr. Hoxie
  The Case of the Prodigal Parent (1958) - Dr. Samuel Anders
  The Case of the Caretaker's Cat (1959) - Autopsy Surgeon
  The Case of the Bedeviled Doctor (1959) - Dr. Hoxie
  The Case of the Lame Canary (1959) - Dr. Hoxie
  The Case of the Artful Dodger (1959) - Autopsy Surgeon
  The Case of the Singular Double (1960) - Autopsy Surgeon
  The Case of the Fickle Fortune (1961) - Autopsy Surgeon
  The Case of the Wintry Wife (1961) - Autopsy Surgeon
  The Case of the Duplicate Daughter (1961) - Autopsy Surgeon
  The Case of the Promoter's Pillbox (1962) - Autopsy Surgeon
  The Case of the Bogus Books (1962) - Coroner's Physician
  The Case of the Libellous Locket (1963) - Physician
  The Case of the Golden Oranges (1963) - Coroner's Physician
  The Case of the Witless Witness (1963) - Autopsy Surgeon
  The Case of the Festive Felon (1963) - Surgeon
  The Case of the Bogus Buccaneers (1966) - Abe Heyman
- Wanted Dead or Alive
  Reunion for a Revenge (1959) - The Quaker
  The Hostage (1959) - Bartender Tom
- Alcoa Theatre
  30 Pieces of Silver (1959) - Mr. Hammeker
  The Observer (1960) - Father Holze
- The Rifleman
  Letter of the Law (1959) - Abel
  The Trade (1959) - Trager
  Miss Millie (1960) - Jim Oxford
  The Hangman (1960) - Joe Hannah
- Richard Diamond, Private Detective
  Marineland Mystery (1959) - Paul Schofield
  Coat of Arms (1960)
  The Popskull (1960)
- The Twilight Zone
  Nightmare as a Child (1960) - Doctor
  Mr. Dingle, the Strong (1961) - Martian
  Sounds and Silences (1964) - Psychiatrist
- The Detectives Starring Robert Taylor
  The Queen of Craven Point (1961) - Lab Man
  The Reason (1961) - Andy
- The Untouchables
  The Stryker Brothers (1962) - Lieutenant Miller
  Death for Sale (1961) - Bradley
- The Dick Powell Show
  Somebody's Waiting (1961)
  The Big Day (1962) - Phil
  The Hook (1962)
  The Legend (1962) - Attorney
  The Old Man and the City (1963)
- The Virginian
  The Brazen Bell (1962) - Prisoner Guard (uncredited)
  No Drums, No Trumpets (1966) - General Howard
  The Price of Love (1969) - Coroner
- Gunsmoke
  Carter Caper (1963) - Waiter
  Wishbone (1966) - Buffalo Hunter
  The Raid: Part 1 (1966) - Mr. Simms - Hotel Clerk
  Hard Luck Henry (1967) - Jed Walsh
- The Big Valley
  Forty Rifles (1965) - De Koven
  The Iron Box (1966) - MacGowan
  Point and Counterpoint (1969) - Jonathan Williams
- Honey West
  A Matter of Wife and Death (1965) - Lieutenant Kovacs
  Come to Me, My Litigation Baby (1966) - Mr. Strate
- Batman
  Holy Rat Race (1966) - Leo Gore
  Smack in the Middle (1966) - Inspector Basch
  Hi Diddle Riddle (1966) - Inspector Basch
- Lost in Space
  Cave of the Wizards (1967) - Alien on Computer Screen
  The Ghost Planet (1966) - Cybernetic Leader/Supreme Brain
- Ironside
  A Very Cool Hot Car (1967) - Technician
  Beyond a Shadow (1969) - Dr. Leonard Marcus
  Death by the Numbers (1972) - Dr. Albert Gold
- Hogan's Heroes
  The Well (1969) - Captain Ritter
  It's Dynamite (1970) - Berger
  Get Fit or Go Fight (1970) Major Kimmel
- Quincy, M.E.
  Jury Duty (1981) - Dr. Feld
  Cover-Up (1980) - Fire Captain
- Mission: Impossible
  Operation Heart (1967) - Dr. Levya
  Underwater (1971) - Mr. Conners (uncredited)
- The Bold and the Beautiful - Saul Feinberg (316 episodes)

=== Singular appearances in television series ===
- The Mickey Rooney Show - Pilot (1954) - Julie's Father
- Hopalong Cassidy - Grubstake (1954) - Brock Fain
- The Lone Wolf - "The Runaway Story" (1954) - Lieutenant Joe Neeley
- Celebrity Playhouse - The Hoax (1955)
- Warner Brothers Presents - Hand of Fate (1955) - Sasha
- The Man Behind the Badge - The Case of the Red Letter Day (1955) - Stranger
- My Little Margie - Corpus Delecti (1955) - Roland Roberts
- Cavalcade of America - Monument to a Young Man (1956) - George Wooley
- Tombstone Territory - Desert Survival (1957) - Warren
- Highway Patrol - Efficiency Secretary (1957) - Dusty Dunn
- The Thin Man - Come Back Darling Asta (1957) - Police Lieutenant Heldon
- Meet McGraw - The Fighter (1957) - Sorrento
- Undercurrent - Front Page Father (1957) - Malcolm Slade
- Alfred Hitchcock Presents (1957) (Season 2 Episode 15: Crackpot) - Sergeant Carpenter
- Dr. Christian - The Alien (1957) - Rausch
- The Walter Winchell File - Muggy Night on Times Square: File #39 (1958) - Harris
- The Adventures of Jim Bowie - The Puma (1958) - Captain
- Adventures of Superman - The Perils of Superman (1958) - The Lead Masked Criminal
- Harbor Command - Four to Die (1958)
- Man with a Camera - The Bride (1959) - Father Ehrlich
- The David Niven Show - The Last Room (1959)
- The Grand Jury - Accident by Appointment (1959)
- Shotgun Slade - Charcoal Bullet (1960) - Doctor Miller
- Johnny Ringo - Soft Cargo (1960) - Clint Logan
- The DuPont Show with June Allyson - Slip of the Tongue (1960) - Harvey
- Dennis the Menace - Dennis and the Rare Coin (1960) - Hathaway
- 87th Precinct - Lady Killer (1961) - Dr. Ben Danlela
- Miami Undercover - The Big Frame (1961) - Chandler
- Dante - Dial D for Dante (1961) - Joe Conway
- Empire - Long Past, Long Remembered (1962) - Chester Arkins
- Target: The Corruptors! - License to Steal (1962)
- Follow the Sun - A Choice of Weapons (1962) - Ernie Glazer
- Breaking Point - And James Was a Very Small Snail (1963)
- Wagon Train - The Molly Kincaid Story (1963) - Al the Bartender
- I'm Dickens, He's Fenster - Is There a Doctor in the House? (1963) - Dr. Levy
- The Rogues - Hugger-Mugger, by the Sea (1964) - Hogan
- My Favorite Martian - Who Am I? (1964) - Dr. Gilbert
- The New Twilight Zone -Examination Day/A Message from Charity (1985) - Tom Carter
- Kraft Suspense Theatre - Kill No More (1965) Howard Link
- Voyage to the Bottom of the Sea - Deadly Invasion (1966) - General Haines
- Felony Squad - Prologue to Murder (1966) - Dr. Kilmer
- Laredo - The Seventh Day (1967) - Bartender
- The Ghost & Mrs. Muir - The Ghost Hunter (1968) - Professor Maxwell
- The Wild Wild West - The Night of the Death-Maker (1968) - Gillespie
- The Flying Nun - A Fish Story (1968) - Ogden
- The Bold Ones: The Senator - The Day the Lion Died (1970) - Kellerman
- The Governor & J.J. - Charley's Back in Town (1970) - Abel Mellon
- The Partners - New Faces (1971) - Dr. Mitchell
- The Mod Squad - And a Little Child Shall Bleed Them (1971) - Doctor
- The Doris Day Show - A Fine Romance (1971) - Captain Mallory
- The Bold Ones: The New Doctors - An Inalienable Right to Die (1972) - Carl Hedge
- The Rookies - The Good Die Young (1972) - Dr. Parkman
- Columbo - Etude in Black (1972) - Dr. Benson
- Temperatures Rising - Good Luck, Leftkowitz (1972) - General
- O'Hara, U.S. Treasury - Operation: Dorias (1972) - Dr. Julian
- Chase - The Garbage Man (1973) - Franco
- Emergency! - Inheritance Tax (1973) - Marshall
- Shaft - The Killing (1973) - Judge Graves
- Kolchak: The Night Stalker - The Energy Eater (1974) - Frank Wesley
- Lucas Tanner - Cheers (1974) - Dr. Wells
- The Rockford Files - Just by Accident (1975) - The Announcer
- Gemini Man - Night Train to Dallas (1976) - Conductor
- Charlie's Angels - Angels in the Wings (1977) - Austin Wells
- Fantasy Island - Seance/Treasure (1979) - Mr. McCloud
- Concrete Cowboys - Episode #1.1 (1981) The Deacon
- Buck Rogers in the 25th Century - Time of the Hawk (1981) - High Judge
- Voyagers! - The Travels of Marco... and Friends (1982) - Isaac Wolfstein
- Tales from the Darkside - Episode #1-17 Madness Room (1983) - The Husband
- Hunter - Pen Pals (1984) - Judge
- Dallas - Fools Rush In (1984)
- Simon & Simon - The Skull of Nostradamus (1985) - Convention Official
- St. Elsewhere - Tears of a Clown (1985)
- Knight Rider - Custom Made Killer (1985) - Phil
- Comedy Factory - Man About Town (1986) - Man in Museum
- MacGyver - Every Time She Smiles (1986) - Bulgarian Officer
- Cagney & Lacey - Right to Remain Silent (1987) - Nat Weinreich
- TV 101 - The Last Temptation of Checker: Part 1 (1989) - Jack Gregory
- The Hogan Family - The Franklin Family (1990) - Jerry Grundig
- Bodies of Evidence - Eleven Grains of Sand (1993) - Earl Stern
- ER - Blizzard (1994) - Mr. Bozinsky
- NYPD Blue - Torah! Torah! Torah! (1995) - Rabbi Rosenthal (final appearance)

=== Feature-length films ===
- Without Warning! (1952) - Cab co Dispatcher (uncredited)
- Blackhawk (1952) - Mr. Case / The Leader
- Last Train from Bombay (1952) - Captain Tamil
- Voodoo Tiger (1952) - Karl Werner, aka Heinrich Schultz
- The Pathfinder (1952) - Narrator (voice, uncredited)
- The Magnetic Monster (1953, also dialogue director) - Dr. Serny
- The Glass Wall (1953) - Inspector Toomey
- Serpent of the Nile (1953) - Octavius
- Siren of Bagdad (1953) - Telar
- The Lost Planet (1953) - Dr. Ernst Grood
- The Beast from 20,000 Fathoms (1953, also dialogue director) - ER Doctor
- Run for the Hills (1953) - Phineas Cragg
- Sky Commando (1953) - Major Scott
- The Great Adventures of Captain Kidd (1953) - Elias Smith (uncredited)
- Slaves of Babylon (1953) - Narrator (voice, uncredited)
- Killer Ape (1953) - The Medical Officer (uncredited)
- Riders to the Stars (1954) - Dr. Klinger (psychiatrist)
- Charge of the Lancers (1954) - Narrator (voice, uncredited)
- The Iron Glove (1954) - Opening Narrator (voice, uncredited)
- Gog (1954, also dialogue director) - Dr. Hubertus
- Down Three Dark Streets (1954) - Paper Plant Superintendent (uncredited)
- Rogue Cop (1954) - Rudy (uncredited)
- Naked Alibi (1954) - Round Man (uncredited)
- Riding with Buffalo Bill (1954) - King Carney
- Masterson of Kansas (1954) - Bartender (uncredited)
- The Silver Chalice (1954) - Slave (uncredited)
- Conquest of Space (1955) - Elsbach
- The Adventures of Captain Africa (1955) - Prime Minister
- The Scarlet Coat (1955) - Major Russell (uncredited)
- The Big Knife (1955) - Prize Fight Announcer (uncredited)
- My Sister Eileen (1955) - Shakespearean actor (uncredited)
- Running Wild (1955) - Delmar Graves
- Crashout (1955, dialogue director)
- Cha-Cha-Cha Boom! (1956) - Frank (uncredited)
- Top Secret Affair (1957) - Reporter Lotzie
- The Girl in the Kremlin (1957) - Igor Smetka
- The Tijuana Story (1957) - Reuben Galindo
- Plunder Road (1957, also Asst to Producer) - Smog Officer / Narrator
- Kiss Them for Me (1957) - War Correspondent (uncredited)
- War of the Satellites (1958) - Jason ibn Akad
- Machine-Gun Kelly (1958) - Detective Clinton
- A Nice Little Bank That Should Be Robbed (1958) - Detective (uncredited)
- Let's Make Love (1960) - Actor auditioning for Clement role (uncredited)
- The Interns (1962) - Dr. Greenberg (uncredited)
- Whatever Happened to Baby Jane? (1962) - TV Commercial Man
- The Misadventures of Merlin Jones (1964) - Kohner, Lie Detector Operator (uncredited)
- A Tiger Walks (1964) - Television Interviewer (uncredited)
- The New Interns (1964) - Dr. Arthur Hellman, Psychiatrist
- Billie (1965) - Ray Case, Reporter
- Angel's Flight (1965) - Jake the Bartender
- The Legend of Lylah Clare (1968) - Announcer
- Now You See It, Now You Don't (1968, TV Movie) - Inspector Delon
- Seven in Darkness (1969, TV Movie) - The Pilot
- The Dunwich Horror (1970) - Dr. Raskin
- Bloody Mama (1970) - Dr. Roth
- If Tomorrow Comes (1971, TV Movie) - Judge
- Two for the Money (1972, TV Movie) - Hospital Administrator
- Wild in the Sky (1972)
- The Judge and Jake Wyler (1972, TV Movie) - Doctor Simon
- The Longest Yard (1974) - Announcer
- Young Frankenstein (1974) - Helga's Father
- The Missiles of October (1974, TV Movie) - Soviet Marshal
- Collision Course: Truman vs. MacArthur (1976, TV Movie) - Admiral Sherman
- Dempsey (1983, TV Movie) - Judge Dooling
- Quicksilver (1986) - Broker at Lunch
- The Malibu Bikini Shop (1986) - Uncle Dave
- Over the Top (1987) - Jim Olson
- She Was Marked for Murder (1988, TV Movie)
- Skinheads (1989) - Saul
