= Garry Robbins =

Canadian wrestler and actor (1957–2013)

- Born: September 9, 1957; St. Catharines, Ontario, Canada
- Died: December 11, 2013 (aged 56); St. Catharines, Ontario, Canada
- Years active: 1982–2008
- Height: 226 cm (7 ft 5 in)
- Website: www.garryrobbins.com Professional wrestling career
- Ring name(s): Canadian Destroyer; Canadian Giant; Demolition Hux; Doug Chevalier; Paul Bunyan
- Billed height: 226 cm (7 ft 5 in)
- Billed weight: 172 kg (379 lb)

Garry Robbins (September 9, 1957 – December 11, 2013) was a Canadian actor, politician and professional wrestler.

== Early life ==
Robbins was born in St. Catharines, Ontario, Canada on September 9, 1957.

== Acting career ==
Robbins was discovered working as a bouncer in a local bar and went on to act in his first feature film, Humongous. In Wrong Turn, he played one of three disfigured brothers in the West Virginia mountains. With makeup and prosthetics by Stan Winston, he portrayed the character "Saw Tooth".

== Professional wrestling career ==
Robbins wrestled all over the world, including for many promotions across Canada, for Global Wrestling Federation in the United States, for New Japan in Japan, for World Wrestling Council in Puerto Rico and for Indo-Asian Wrestling in India in the early 1990s. While in Japan he often worked tag team bouts teaming with Demolition Ax as "Demolition Hux". He was also a stuntman, stunt coordinator, voiceover artist and bodyguard. He retired from wrestling in 1993.

== Political career ==
On August 1, 2006 Garry Robbins officially entered the City of St. Catharines' Mayoral race. On November 13, 2006 he received 2,263 votes, 5.9% of the vote total placing 7th out of 8 total candidates. This was his only known foray into politics.

== Death ==
Robbins died December 11, 2013 in his home in St. Catharines due to a massive heart attack at the age of 56.

== Filmography ==
=== Movies ===
Year	Film	Role	Notes
2008	The Love Guru	Biker	
2006	Tears of a Clown	Henchman	
2003	Wrong Turn	Saw-Tooth	
2002	Narc	Biker	
2000	Jill Rips	David Daniels	(as Gary Robbins)
1999	Babel	Wasco	
1999	Call of the Wild: Part 1	Big Toe Blake	
1998	My Date with the President's Daughter	Biker #1	TV movie
1997	The Champ	Mike the Mauler	
1996	The Stupids	Extremely Tall Guy	
1996	Balance of Power	Giant Man	
1995	The Witness	Carl	
1995	Gladiator Cop	Mongol	
1995	Blood Money	Doorman	
1994	In the Mouth of Madness	Truck Driver	
1993	TC 2000	The Giant	(as Gary Robbins)
1993	Back in Action	Giant	
1989	Crazy as a Soup Sandwich	Volkerps	
1988	Short Circuit 2	Francis	
1982	Humongous	Ida's Son	

=== Television ===
Year	Series	Role	Episodes
2006	Jeff Ltd.	Henchman	
1999	Due South Due South	'Big Toe' Blake	The Call of the Wild List of Due South episodes#ep66
1997	Wind at My Back	Mike 'The Mauler'	
1996	Goosebumps	Mud Monster	You Can't Scare Me!
1995	Due South Due South	Carl	Witness List of Due South episodes#ep66
1995	Forever Knight	Doorman	
1989	The Twilight Zone	Volkerps	Crazy as a Soup Sandwich

1987 The Super Dave Osborne Show Wrestler Poundacise
