= A Message from Charity =

- The Twilight Zone segment
- Scene from "A Message from Charity"
- Episode no.: Season 1 Episode 6b
- Directed by: Paul Lynch
- Written by: Alan Brennert
- Based on: short story by William M. Lee
- Original air date: November 1, 1985

Guest appearances
- Kerry Noonan as Charity Payne; (Robert) Duncan McNeill as Peter Wood; Vanessa Brown as Aunt Beulah; Gerald Hiken as Squire Jonas Hacker; James Cromwell as Obadiah Payne; Michael Fox as Tom Carter; Jennifer Parsons as Ursula Miller; Jack Wells as Dr. Maxwell; Phil Proctor as Mr. Wood; Barbara Lindsay as Mrs. Wood

Episode chronology
← Previous "Examination Day"	Next → "Teacher's Aide"

"A Message from Charity" is the second segment of the sixth episode of the first season from the television series The Twilight Zone. In this segment, a pair of teenagers – one from 1700, and one from 1985 – share a mental link across time.

== Plot ==
Two teenagers – Peter Wood, an academically overachieving loner from 1985, and Charity Payne, a Puritan from 1700 Colonial Massachusetts – come into telepathic contact with each other when they have high fever from the same bacterial infection. After Peter convinces Charity she is not bedeviled, they find they enjoy each other's conversation and remain in frequent contact as they go about their day. Peter is heartened to have made at least one friend, while Charity is intrigued by the future events and technologies he tells her about.

At Peter's coaxing, Charity tells her neighbors about some of her "future visions", including the American Revolution. The notion that the Thirteen Colonies will eventually revolt against their government is controversial, and a posse led by Squire Jonas Hacker visits Charity's home to follow up on suspicions she is a witch. When Hacker tries to examine Charity for a witches' mark, she fears he intends to sexually molest her and flees.

Peter tells Charity to take refuge in a region less beset by panic over witchcraft, but she refuses to leave her home, so he searches library records of witch trials to see if she will be tried if she comes out of hiding. He instead stumbles on a biographical entry on Hacker, who was posthumously convicted of a double homicide. At her trial, Charity claims that her visions come not from witchcraft, but from a God-given second sight, and uses her knowledge of the murders to blackmail Hacker into supporting her claims. After her acquittal, Charity breaks off her relationship with Peter so that she will not risk getting into trouble again.

A year later, Peter receives one last telepathic call from Charity. She has left him a message at a local landmark known as Bear Rock. Peter finds Charity's message: chiseled into Bear Rock are the initials "CP + PW" inside a heart shape.

== Production ==
"A Message from Charity" is based on the short story of the same name by William M. Lee. The story was first published in The Magazine of Fantasy and Science Fiction (November 1967). In the original short story, Peter Wood is 16 years old while Charity Payne is 11 years old. The episode's screenwriter, Alan Brennert, was worried this might seem inappropriate and made the characters the same age. He also changed Peter to a loner who comes out of his shell thanks to his relationship with Charity; however, he resisted the producers' suggestion that he modernize the story by having Peter introduce Charity to elements of 1980s-specific pop culture.

Robert MacNaughton, who was known for his role as Elliott's brother Michael in 1982 film E.T. the Extra-Terrestrial, was initially cast in the role of Peter Wood, but dropped out shortly before filming was due to begin. The producers quickly scheduled a casting call to find a replacement, and Robert Duncan McNeill was offered the role and flown out to Los Angeles within a day of his audition, which had taken place in New York.

Actress Kerry Noonan originally auditioned for the part of Ursula Miller, but after reading the script, implored the casting directors to let her read for the lead role of Charity Payne as well. Noonan was ultimately passed up for both roles, and the part of Charity Payne was given to Justine Bateman, who had not auditioned but had been cast on the strength of her lead roles in a popular sitcom of the time and a television film. According to Brennert, Bateman (whom he did not name) had difficulty with the Puritan lingo and refused to take direction during the first two days of filming, which were devoted to shooting the 20th century scenes, with Bateman talking to McNeill from off-camera. Due to the extent of the problems with Bateman, Brennert felt the best solution was to recast the part, even though it was Friday and filming of the Charity scenes was scheduled to begin on Monday. The casting director recalled that Noonan had done a good reading for Charity, and at his suggestion she was called in for another audition. Noonan said the part came very naturally to her, since she was an avid reader of historical fiction, had played in a number of historical dramas in high school, and even used to role-play as a Puritan when she was a young child.

Though the Charity shots and Peter shots were mostly filmed separately, the scene where Peter washes his car while Charity gardens was filmed with Robert Duncan McNeill positioned at the edge of the field where Kerry Noonan was performing; the actors instinctively shouted their lines to each other until they were directed to speak at a lower volume.

Airplanes were flying overhead during the filming of the trial scene, so all the dialogue for that scene had to be dubbed afterwards.
