= The Girl I Married =

- The Twilight Zone segment
- Episode no.: Season 2 Episode 35b
- Directed by: Philip DeGuere
- Written by: J. M. DeMatteis
- Original air date: July 17, 1987

Guest appearances
- Linda Kelsey as Valerie; James Whitmore Jr. as Ira; Dennis Patrick as Marvin

Episode chronology
← Previous "Song of the Younger World"	Next → "The Curious Case of Edgar Witherspoon"

"The Girl I Married" is the second segment of the thirty-fifth episode and the twentieth episode of the second season (1986–87) of the television series The Twilight Zone.

== Plot ==
Two middle-aged gentlemen enter a restaurant and are seated. As they look over their menus, one of the men, Marvin, apprehensively shows a picture of a young woman to the other man, Ira, who smiles. Marvin suddenly begins to wonder if Ira and his wife Valerie are having problems, because he has been seen mooning over this picture. Ira laughs it off, takes the picture home and shows it to his wife Valerie; it turns out that the lady in the picture is Valerie, albeit from many years before. Although he finds it amusing and nostalgic, she finds it a terrible reminder of the lives they led at the time. She then shows him a picture of himself at the time—bearded and wearing blue jeans. As he ponders the past, Ira lays the pictures on the table and goes upstairs to bed. Unbeknownst to either Ira or Valerie, the image of Valerie in the picture suddenly disappears.

The next day, Ira sees the very young Valerie sitting in a park. He thinks it is the present-day Valerie playing a joke and after spending the afternoon together in bed, the young Valerie explains that she is the girl he married. Because he wanted her to change she became real. She reminds him of the ideals they believed in then and he laments about it, and when he starts to justify becoming a corporate sellout she thinks he has become "a drag" and disappears.

After an uncomfortable moment with the older Valerie that evening, Ira spends the next day with younger Valerie, attempting to rejuvenate the relationship they had. Later, the younger Valerie tries to convince Ira to choose her over her older self when they come in on the older Valerie with a younger Ira. After an argument with their younger selves, Ira and Valerie realize they still love each other and they still have a lot of life to live yet. The younger Ira and Valerie smile and disappear while the older Ira and Valerie discuss starting a family together.

=== Closing narration ===
It has been said that the eighties are just the sixties, twenty years later. The costumes may change, but the cast remains: the arrogant, the radical, the naive, and the cynical; the misplaced and the spaced. Each, a stage in the growth of a generation as it treads the tail-end of the twentieth century on a long journey...through the Twilight Zone.

== Production ==
Roughly half a year before the episode aired, J. M. DeMatteis commented "I have a feeling that the show that appears will not bear much relation to what I wrote. What I've found out is that this season—unlike last, where the script was pretty much regarded as sacrosanct—the network is really interfering a lot. ... Regardless, I know I did a good job and it was a real satisfying experience."
