= Charles E. Fritch =

American novelist

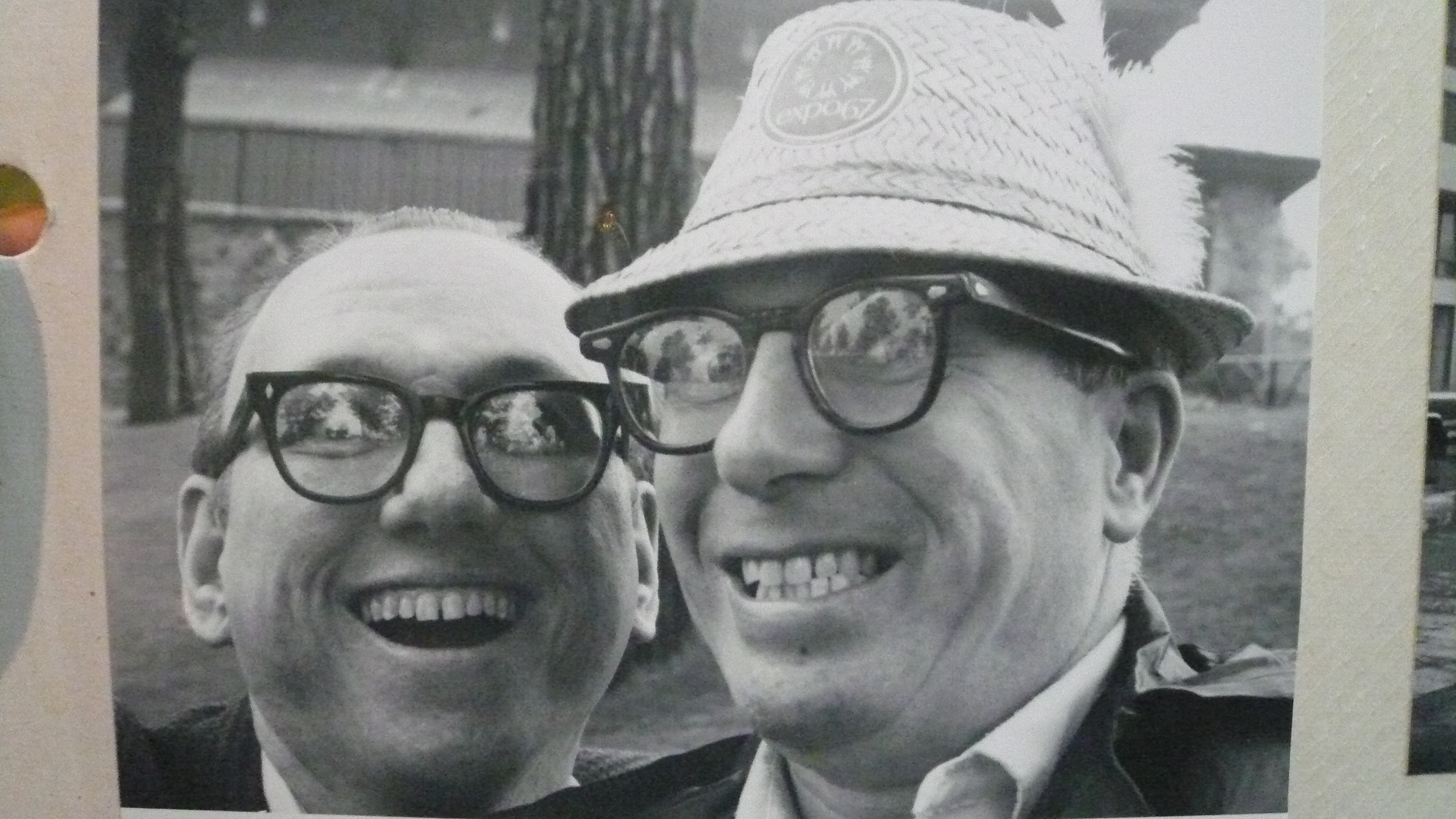
- William F. Nolan and Charles E. Fritch at Expo 67
- Born: Charles Edward Fritch; January 20, 1927; Utica, New York
- Died: October 11, 2012 (aged 85); Los Angeles, California, United States
- Writing career
- Period: 1952–2012
- Genres: fantasy, social commentary, short story, science fiction, horror fiction, mystery fiction

Charles E. Fritch (January 20, 1927 – October 11, 2012) was an American author and editor of fantasy, science fiction, horror and mystery fiction. He was the editor of Mike Shayne Mystery Magazine from 1979 until 1985. His short story, "Misfortune Cookie", was adapted for an episode of the television series The Twilight Zone.

== Life and career ==
Fritch was born in Utica, New York. Beginning at age 10, he wanted to become a science fiction writer and kept notes of story ideas in a notebook.

He served during World War II as a paratrooper, and later graduated from New York state's Syracuse University with a degree in English and a minor in Psychology (the latter, he claimed, so that he could "get inside the heads of his story characters").

During the early 1950s, he relocated to Los Angeles where he met William F. Nolan with whom he been corresponding about Nolan's publication The Ray Bradbury Review. Nolan introduced him to author Charles Beaumont, and he soon became a member of "The Group", also referred to as The Southern California School of Writers, whose members included Beaumont, Nolan, John Tomerlin, George Clayton Johnson, Richard Matheson, OCee Ritch, Chad Oliver, and by extension, Ray Bradbury, Robert Bloch, and Harlan Ellison.

Fritch sold stories to science fiction and mystery magazines and also published the magazine Gamma with Nolan as managing editor. He also wrote provocative mystery novels, including Negative of a Nude, 7 Deadly Sinners, and Strip for Murder and sold to various markets using several pseudonyms.

He was an active science fiction fan, and was good friends with Forrest J Ackerman, frequenting the Ackermansion and attending parties in his area. He was fond of his wife, Shirley, who was reported to bear a good resemblance to Elizabeth Taylor, and liked to prank acquaintances by having her make a grand entrance.

Fritch is buried in the Hollywood Forever Cemetery.

== Selected works ==
=== Short fiction ===
- "The Wallpaper", Other Worlds Science Stories, 1951
- "Night Talk", Starling Stories, 1952.
- "The Cog", Astounding Science Fiction, 1953.
- "The Ship", with William F. Nolan, The Magazine of Fantasy and Science Fiction, 1955.
- "Big Wide Wonderful World", The Magazine of Fantasy and Science Fiction, 1958.
- "The Castaway", Gamma, 1963.
- "Different", California Sorcery. Edited by William F. Nolan. Cemetery Dance Publications, 1999.

=== Collections ===
- Crazy Mixed-Up Planet, short story collection. Author. Powell, 1969.
- Horses' Asteroid, short story collection. Author. Powell, 1970.

=== Editor ===
- Gamma, magazine. Editor. Star Press, 1963–1965.
- Mike Shayne Mystery Magazine, magazine. Editor. Renown Publications, 1979–1985.

=== Television ===
- "The Misfortune Cookie", segment. Writer. The Twilight Zone, 1986.

=== Novels ===
- Negative of a Nude. Author. Ace Books, 1959.
- Strip for Murder. As Eric Thomas. Kozy Books, 1960.
- 7 Deadly Sinners. As Christopher Sly. Athena Books, 1961.
- Psycho Sinner As Eric Thomas, Athena Books, 1961
