= The Misfortune Cookie =

- The Twilight Zone segment
- Scene from The Misfortune Cookie
- Episode no.: Season 1 Episode 14c
- Directed by: Allan Arkush
- Written by: Steven Rae
- Based on: "The Misfortune Cookie" by Charles E. Fritch
- Original air date: January 3, 1986

Guest appearances
- Elliott Gould as Harry Folger; Bennett Ohta as Mr. Lee; Caroline Lagerfelt as April Hamilton; Frederick Coffin as Max; Claire Carter as Glamorous Gourmette; John G. Scanlon as O'Malley; Elven Harvard as Guard; Al Leong as Proprietor

Episode chronology
← Previous "The Little People of Killany Woods"	Next → "Monsters!"

"The Misfortune Cookie" is the third segment of the fourteenth episode of the first season of the television series The Twilight Zone. In this segment, a restaurant critic discovers a Chinese restaurant where the fortune cookies have fortunes which come true.

== Plot ==
Harry Folger is a food critic for a major newspaper. Restaurants live or die by his reviews, which often use gratuitously nasty prose in order to draw more readers. Spiting journalistic integrity, Harry usually only visits the restaurants he pans so that he can collect their matchbooks and display them as tombstones in a graveyard scene at his office.

Harry visits a new Chinese restaurant called "Mr. Lee's Chinese Cuisine", orders a massive amount of food and then immediately asks for the check without eating. Assuming Harry was displeased with the food, the owner Mr. Lee apologizes, tells Harry the meal is free, and presents him with a fortune cookie. The fortune reads "A grand reward awaits you just around the corner."

As Harry walks past an alley, a thief knocks him down and drops $100,000 in diamonds before running away. The grateful jewelry store owner gives Harry $1,000 as a reward. Realizing the fortune cookies are magical, Harry returns for more. When Mr. Lee complains that customers canceled their reservations because of his review, Harry promises to write a more favorable re-review if he is allowed to have a table. After again not touching his food, he receives a fortune that says "April arrives today, bringing romance." As it is September, Harry storms out, intending to go back on his promise. On the way to his office, he meets a woman asking for directions. He shows her the way and asks her out to dinner. She introduces herself as April Hamilton.

Harry takes her out to Mr. Lee's. Harry, again, does not eat any food despite April telling him how good it is. As the two get fortune cookies, April's fortune says that she will soon recognize a grievous error in judgment, while Harry's fortune says "You're going to die." Outraged, Harry threatens Mr. Lee and causes a scene. Disconcerted, April leaves. As he exits the restaurant, Harry is overcome with massive hunger pangs. He finds that he is on a street of Chinese restaurants that were not there before. He wanders into one restaurant, but is unable to satisfy his hunger. As he continues to endlessly eat, he receives a fortune cookie that says "You're dead." A tombstone with Harry's name on it has been added to his matchbook graveyard.

== Origin ==
The script is very closely based on the short story of the same name by Charles E. Fritch and published in 1970 in The Magazine of Fantasy & Science Fiction, later collected in 100 Great Science Fiction Short Short Stories edited by Isaac Asimov. In the story, rather than meeting April Hamilton, Harry meets an old friend named Cynthia Peters; despite that both are married, they soon fall into a torrid affair, in part due to their mutual love of Chinese food. Harry eventually is found out and finds Cynthia's husband and his own wife both pointing guns at him, but makes a narrow escape into the Chinese restaurant, where, as in the episode, the food never fills him up and the fortune cookies all tell him that he is dead.
