= Paladin of the Lost Hour =

- The Twilight Zone segment
- Scene from "Paladin of the Lost Hour"
- Episode no.: Season 1 Episode 7b
- Directed by: Alan Smithee
- Written by: Harlan Ellison
- Original air date: November 8, 1985

Guest appearances
- Danny Kaye as Gaspar; Glynn Turman as Billy Kinetta; John Bryant as Punk #1; Corkey Ford as Punk #2; Mike Reynolds as Driver

Episode chronology
← Previous "Teacher's Aide"	Next → "Act Break"

"Paladin of the Lost Hour" is the second segment of the seventh episode of the first season of the first revival of the television series The Twilight Zone, adapted from a novelette by scriptwriter Harlan Ellison. The story follows the friendship between a Vietnam veteran and an old man entrusted with forestalling the end of the universe. The television episode starred Danny Kaye in one of his final screen appearances.

== Plot ==
An old man named Gaspar is attacked by muggers in a cemetery. As one of the muggers takes his pocket watch, it burns the mugger's hand and floats through the air back to Gaspar. A man named Billy fends off the muggers, and Gaspar and Billy go to Billy's apartment. Gaspar tells Billy he was at the cemetery to visit his wife Minna. Afterwards, Billy leaves for work but allows Gaspar to stay and rest. Despite their solitary lifestyles, the two men become friends, with Billy discovering that Gaspar is homeless and dying and offering to let him stay at his apartment.

As they watch the news, Billy worries that the world is close to a nuclear war; Gaspar tells him that's not possible because his watch shows it is only 11 o'clock. Billy tells Gaspar about his experiences in the Vietnam War and explains that the man he visits in the cemetery sacrificed himself to save his life. Billy has been wracked with guilt ever since.

While Gaspar is asleep, Billy tries to look at the pocket watch but it floats away and returns to Gaspar, who upon awakening says he wants Billy to accompany him to the cemetery the next day because he believes he is going to die.

At the cemetery, Gaspar tells Billy that when the world adopted the Gregorian calendar, which advanced time by eleven days, their calculations were off by one hour. Gaspar is the latest of the "paladins of the lost hour", who are tasked with preserving that one hour and preventing the end of time. If Gaspar dies before passing the watch on, the watch will begin to tick. Gaspar offers the watch to Billy, but Billy says he doesn't want the responsibility. Gaspar then asks Billy to use the watch to call back Minna and give Gaspar one minute with her, but Billy says this would be wrong. Gaspar tells Billy that his response was correct and that he passed the test. As a reward, Gaspar lets the watch tick for one minute. A Marine in full dress uniform appears. The Marine tells Billy he never knew he saved Billy's life, but nevertheless is happy his death served a purpose. Gaspar gives Billy the watch and dies. Finally released from his guilt, Billy leaves the cemetery as the newest paladin.

== Production ==
The novelette and script were written at the same time. Although in the original story it is not stated which man is black and which is white, it was impossible to conceal the characters' races in television form, and Harlan Ellison wrote the script specifically with Glynn Turman in mind for the part of Billy. Ellison had once thrown a lit cigarette onto the back seat of a litterbug's car himself, and then put it into this story.

The tale originally had a different ending. Story editor Alan Brennert and associate producer James Crocker argued with Ellison that it needed to be changed over a series of meetings. Ellison was unwilling to compromise on the story, but eventually came to the conclusion that Brennert and Crocker were right, and he changed both the script and the novelette. The story appears in Ellison's collection Angry Candy.

According to Joe Dante, director Gil Cates demanded that his name be taken off this episode over producer Philip DeGuere's "botched" editing of the segment. Ellison had a different take on events, saying that Cates's directing job was so poor that extensive editing was necessary to get the show into a broadcast-worthy state, to the point where the opening narration had to be cut because Cates had not shot enough salvageable footage for the introduction. He also maintained that DeGuere was ill at the time and had no role in the editing of the segment.

== Reception ==
The novelette won the 1986 Hugo Award for Best Novelette and the episode (which also included "Teacher's Aide") won the 1987 Writers Guild of America Award for Anthology Episode/Single Program.
