= Mefisto in Onyx =

Novella by Harlan Ellison

- First edition
- Author: Harlan Ellison
- Cover artist: Frank Miller
- Language: English
- Genre: Science fiction
- Publisher: Mark V. Ziesing
- Publication date: November 1, 1993
- Publication place: United States
- Media type: Print (hardcover)
- Pages: 91
- ISBN: 978-0929480312
- Preceded by: Angry Candy
- Followed by: Mind Fields

Mefisto in Onyx is a science fiction novella by American writer Harlan Ellison. The introduction and cover art were contributed by Frank Miller. Originally published in OMNI Magazine October 1993, then released as a hardcover in December 1993, Mefisto in Onyx was later included in Harlan Ellison's 1997 collection Slippage.

Ellison stated in an interview with Salon that he wrote Mefisto in Onyx to be adapted into a film starring Forest Whitaker.

The story won the 1993 Bram Stoker Award, tied with The Night We Buried Road Dog by Jack Cady. It also won first place in the 1994 Locus Poll Award "Best Novella" category.

== Plot ==
A black telepath delves into the mind of a white serial killer on death row.
