= Chitlik =

Chitlik is a surname. Notable people with the surname include:

- Paul Chitlik, American screenwriter
- Sophia Chitlik, American politician
