= Special Service =

- The Twilight Zone episode
- Episode no.: Season 3 Episode 29
- Directed by: Randy Bradshaw
- Written by: J. Michael Straczynski
- Original air date: April 8, 1989

Guest appearances
- David Naughton as John Selig; Keith Knight as Archie the Repairman; Elias Zarou as The Network Manager; Susan Roman as Leslie

Episode chronology
← Previous "Crazy as a Soup Sandwich"	Next → "Father and Son Game"

"Special Service" is the sixty-fourth episode, and the twenty-seventh episode of the third season (1988–89), of the television series The Twilight Zone. It was written by J. Michael Straczynski. In the episode, a man discovers that for the past five years, he has been under constant video surveillance and the footage broadcast 24/7 as a hit TV show. Some critics noted similarities between the episode's story and the critically acclaimed 1998 feature film The Truman Show. Unlike The Truman Show, however, "Special Service" consistently treats its premise as humorous and implausible, a satire of the human tendency to assume that events revolve around oneself.

== Plot ==
John Selig is shaving when his bathroom mirror falls on one side to reveal a camera. A repairman named Archie rushes in and puts the mirror back up. When John questions him, Archie denies the camera's existence and attempts to leave. He mentions John's boss by name, and comments that John is not as nice as he appears on television. When John threatens to call the police, Archie pulls him into the closet and tells him that John's life is broadcast on television to the entire planet 24 hours a day. John is upset that he did not know and Archie says the show is only interesting because he is unaware.

John tells his wife Leslie about his recent discovery. She brushes it off, but as she kisses him goodbye, she whispers not to blow it because the ratings are good. John sweeps his house for cameras. As he finds and disables them, the phone rings and he is warned not to damage the equipment. He continues and men abduct John and Archie, taking them to a television network building. John meets with the network manager, who is outraged at him, saying that after five years the show has only just reached the break even point. John's life is mostly allowed to run unscripted, but if the ratings struggle the producers intervene to add interest. Everyone in John's vicinity signed an agreement not to reveal the truth to John in exchange for appearing on the show. Even Leslie was hired by the producers. The manager demands he pretend to still be unaware, but John is outraged and wants his privacy. The manager gives in.

When John is left alone in the manager's office he is attacked by female fans. Archie arrives to take John home. Archie was fired because of his indiscretion. As the cameras are removed, John discovers the fan mail and gifts that accumulated over the past five years. Archie also brings him a million-dollar check, back pay for being on the show. John thinks that perhaps he preferred life on television. Archie pulls him into the closet again and suggests that the manager may have lied about taking John off the air, to trick him into being unaware again. After Archie leaves, John searches for cameras. He finds nothing, but compulsively begins a dance to entertain his presumed audience.
