= Angry Candy =

Book by Harlan Ellison

- First edition
- Author: Harlan Ellison
- Language: English
- Genre: Speculative fiction
- Publisher: Houghton Mifflin
- Publication date: 1988
- Publication place: Canada
- Media type: Print (hardcover)
- Pages: 324
- ISBN: 0-395-48307-7
- OCLC: 17953634
- Dewey Decimal: 813/.54 19
- LC Class: PS3555.L62 A87 1988

Angry Candy is a 1988 collection of short stories by American writer Harlan Ellison, loosely organized around the theme of death. The title comes the last line of the poem "the Cambridge ladies who live in furnished souls" by E. E. Cummings, "...the/ moon rattles like a fragment of angry candy."

The collection contains the short story "Eidolons", which won the 1989 Locus poll award for best short story. It also contains the novelette "Paladin of the Lost Hour", winner of a Hugo Award for best novelette and later converted by Ellison into an episode of the television series The Twilight Zone (1985), as well as the short story "Soft Monkey", which won Ellison his second Edgar Award, in 1988. Angry Candy was nominated for a Bram Stoker Award and won a World Fantasy award for best collection of short stories and the Locus Award for Best Collection in 1989.

== Contents ==
- Introduction: "The Wind Took Your Answer Away"
- "Paladin of the Lost Hour"
- "Footsteps"
- "Escapegoat"
- "When Auld's Acquaintance Is Forgot"
- "Broken Glass"
- "On the Slab"
- "Prince Myshkin, and Hold the Relish"
- "The Region Between"
- "Laugh Track"
- "Eidolons"
- "Soft Monkey"
- "Stuffing"
- "With Virgil Oddum at the East Pole"
- "Quicktime"
- "The Avenger of Death"
- "Chained to the Fast Lane in the Red Queen's Race"
- "The Function of Dream Sleep"
