= Robert Duncan McNeill =

American actor and director (born 1964)

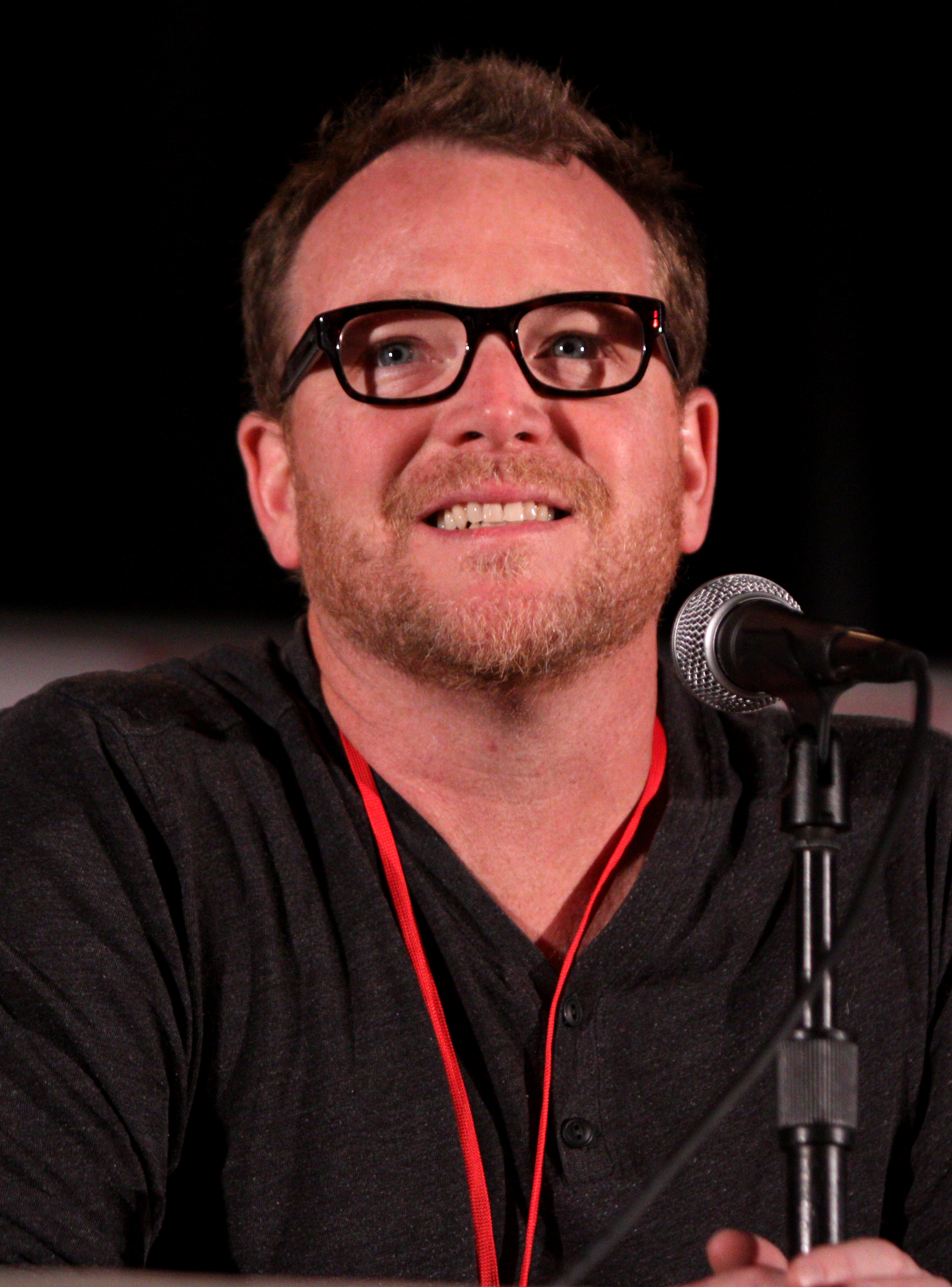
- McNeill at the Phoenix Comic Con in 2011
- Born: November 9, 1964 (age 61); Raleigh, North Carolina, U.S.
- Education: Juilliard School
- Occupations: Actor, producer, director
- Years active: 1981–present
- Political party: Democratic
- Spouses: Carol Seder (m. 1988; div. 2015) Rebecca Jayne McNeill (m. 2021)
- Children: 3
- Website: www.rdmdirector.com

Robert Duncan McNeill (born November 9, 1964) is an American film director, producer, actor, and political candidate. As an actor, he is best known for his role as Lieutenant Tom Paris on the television series Star Trek: Voyager. He has also served as an executive producer and frequent director of the television series Chuck, Resident Alien, The Gifted, and Turner & Hooch.

== Career ==
=== Acting ===
McNeill grew up in Atlanta and began his career acting in local and regional productions before becoming a student at Juilliard School in New York City. He enjoyed early success as a professional actor, winning the role of Charlie Brent on All My Children and starring in the feature film Masters of the Universe alongside Courteney Cox. He starred in "A Message from Charity", an episode of the 1980s version of The Twilight Zone.

He appeared with Stockard Channing in the Broadway production of Six Degrees of Separation. McNeill played the role of Jack in the national touring company of Into the Woods, Stephen Sondheim's Tony Award–winning musical, before returning to Los Angeles to pursue roles on television. He also featured in guest roles on several TV series, including L.A. Law, Quantum Leap, and Murder, She Wrote. He was a featured cast member on the short-lived 1992 series Going to Extremes. Another guest role that same year was in "The First Duty", an episode of Star Trek: The Next Generation, in which he played Nick Locarno, a Starfleet Academy cadet and squad leader who pressures fellow cadets (including Wesley Crusher) into covering up their wrongdoings. In 1995, he became a Trek regular on Star Trek: Voyager, in which he played Tom Paris, a Starfleet officer with a backstory similar to Locarno's. In 2023, he reprised the role of Nick Locarno in Star Trek: Lower Decks season four.

His other credits include Zebulun in Joseph and the Amazing Technicolor Dreamcoat at the Paper Mill Playhouse.

=== Directing ===
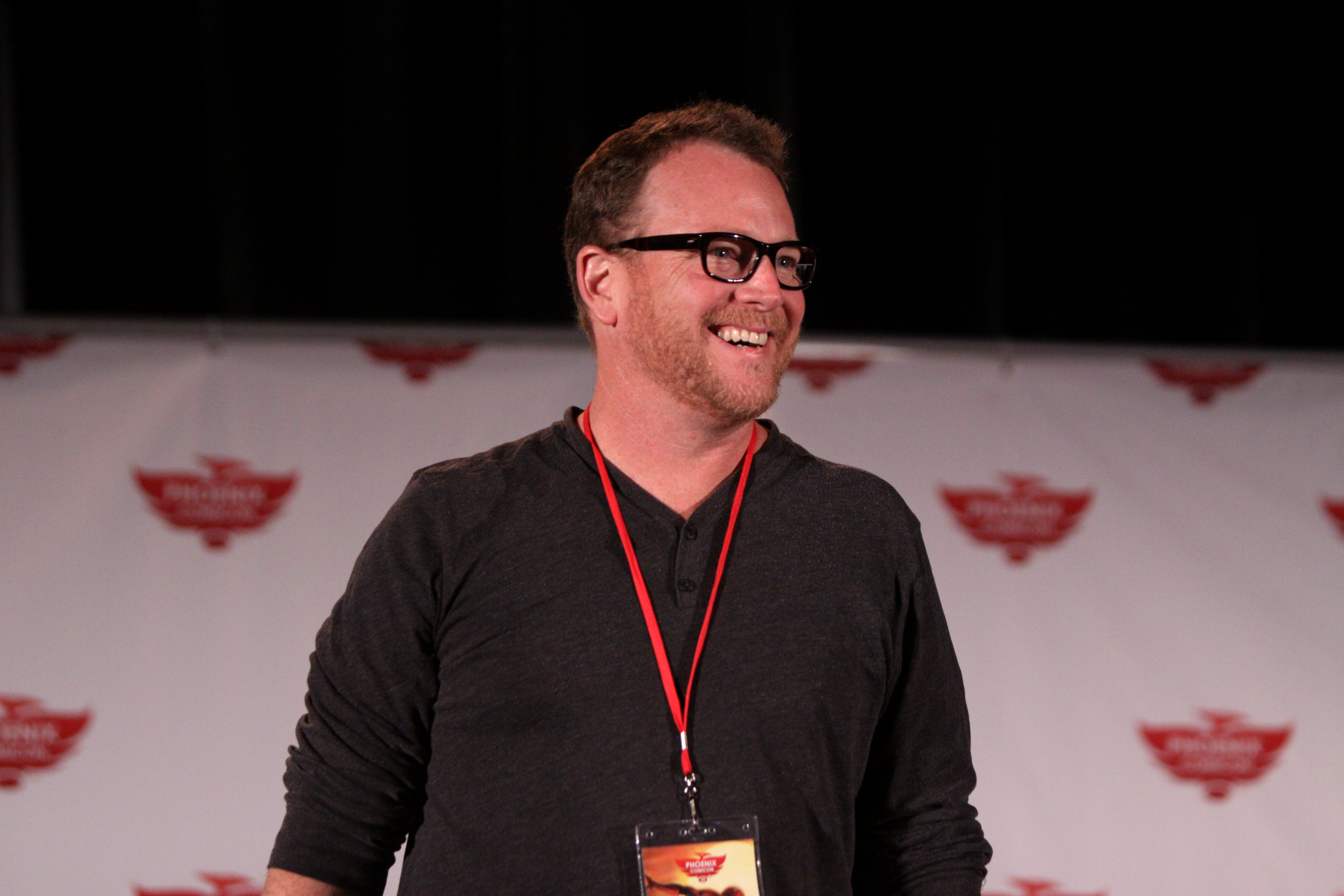

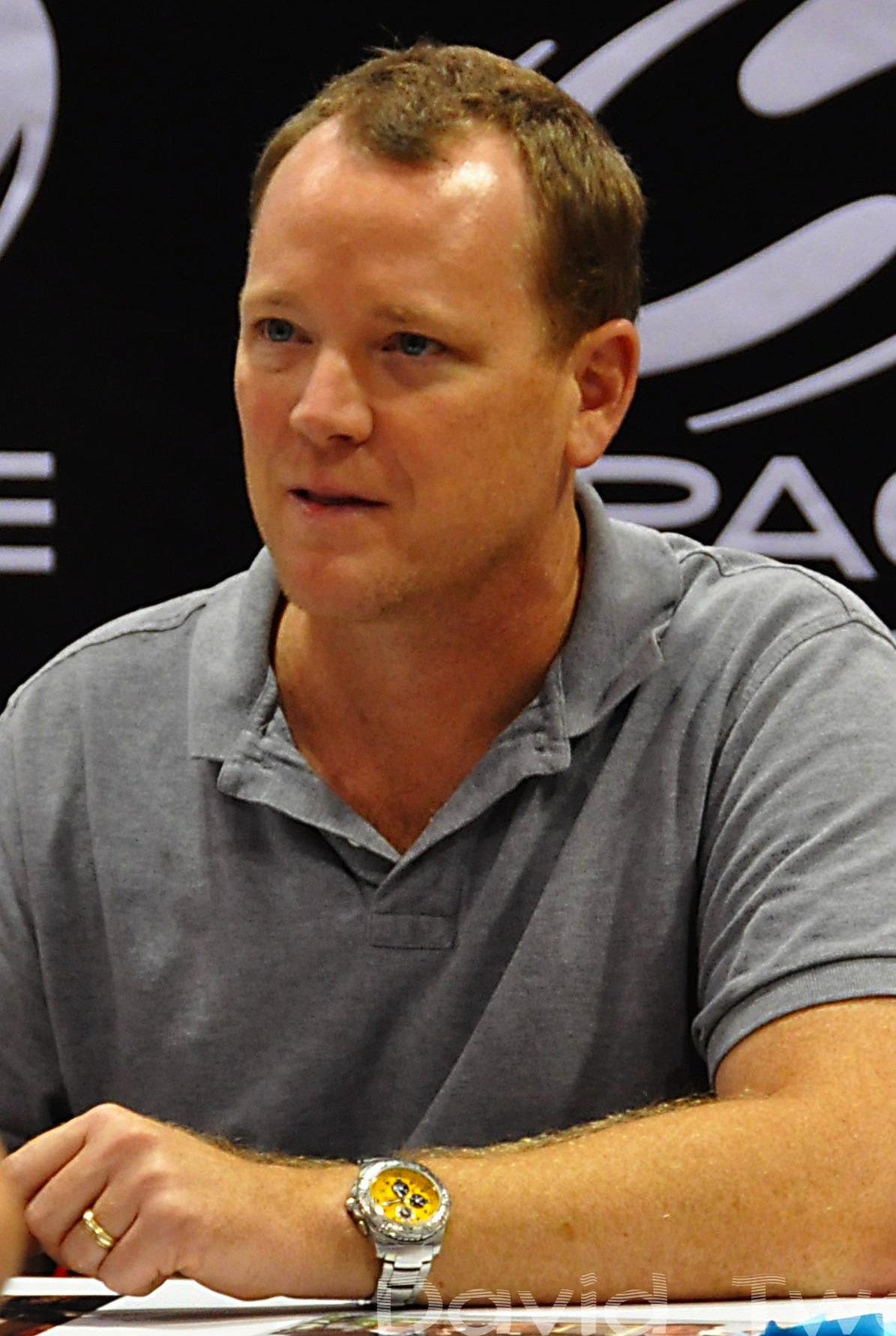
Robert McNeill in 2009

McNeill began his directing career with four episodes of Voyager. He then wrote, produced, and directed two award-winning short films, The Battery starring Joshua Jackson and 9mm of Love, and began to direct other episodic television shows. While he has since performed as a guest star on television shows such as The Outer Limits and Crossing Jordan, McNeill is now focusing on his directing career, helming episodes of Dawson's Creek, Everwood, Star Trek: Enterprise, Dead Like Me, The O.C., One Tree Hill, Las Vegas, Summerland, and Supernatural. His directing credits for 2006–2007 included episodes of Desperate Housewives, Medium, Standoff, The Nine, The Knights of Prosperity, In Case of Emergency, What About Brian, and My Boys. In 2007, he directed the season-five premiere of Las Vegas, the pilot of Samantha Who?, and then signed on as a producer-director of the NBC show Chuck, helming numerous episodes, including the first episode of a television show to be broadcast entirely in three dimensional style. From 2010 through 2015, McNeill directed episodes of V, Smash, White Collar, Breaking In, The Mentalist, Blue Bloods, Suburgatory, Warehouse 13, Mind Games, and Red Band Society. In 2013, McNeill became an executive producer and director of Girlfriends' Guide to Divorce for all 5 seasons. As of 2019, he has directed episodes of the Fox series The Orville, as well as episodes of A Million Little Things, The Resident, and Suits, as well as executive produced and directed The Gifted. In 2021, McNeill executive produced and directed several episodes of the Disney+ series Turner & Hooch. In 2019, he became the producer-director on SYFY's Resident Alien, now in its 4th season. From 2022 to 2024, McNeill directed episodes of So Help Me Todd, True Lies, and Alert: Missing Persons Unit.

=== Podcast ===
In May 2020, McNeill and Voyager co-star Garrett Wang started the podcast The Delta Flyers, wherein they discuss episodes of Voyager. The show has been successful enough that it has progressed to episodes of Deep Space Nine, with Armin Shimerman and Terry Farrell as regular hosts.

=== Politics ===
On September 1, 2026, McNeill registered to run as a Democratic candidate for the Wasatch County Council, replacing the former nominee Patrick Saucier.

== Personal life ==
McNeill and his first wife, Carol, had three children together before their 2015 divorce.

In 2005, McNeill directed his then-teenaged daughter, Taylor, when she had a small role in the episode "The Pleiades" of the series Summerland.

His son Kyle is a singer-songwriter.

McNeill married Rebecca Jayne McNeill in Vancouver, Canada, on March 7, 2021.

== Filmography ==
=== Films ===
Year	Title	Credit	Role	Notes
1981	Sharky's Machine		Teen on bus	Uncredited role
1987	Masters of the Universe		Kevin Corrigan	
1997	Trekkies		Himself	
1998	The Battery	Director and Executive Producer		Short film
2000	9mm of Love	Director, Writer, and Executive Producer		Short film
2002	Infested		Eric	
2011	FedCon XX: The SciFi Experience		Himself	Documentary

=== Television ===
Year	Title	Credit	Role	Notes
1985	Ein Fenster in Manhattan		Eric	TV movie
1985	The Twilight Zone		Peter Wood	"A Message from Charity"
1985	ABC Weekend Specials		Erik Mason	Season 9, Episode 2
1985–1988	All My Children		Charlie Brent	
1989	Mothers, Daughters and Lovers		Actor	TV movie
1990	CBS Schoolbreak Special		Richard	Season 7, Episode 2
1990	Quantum Leap		Greg Truesdale	"Good Night, Dear Heart"
1990	Lucky Chances		Craven Richmond	miniseries
1991	L.A. Law		Mike Riley	Season 6, Episode 2
1992	Star Trek: The Next Generation		Cadet First Class Nicholas Locarno	"The First Duty"
1992	Homefront		Bill Caswell	4 episodes
1992–1993	Going to Extremes		Colin Midford	17 episodes
1993	Spies		Sam the coast guard	TV movie
1994	Murder, She Wrote		Danny Kinkaid	Season 11, Episode 4
1994	Sisters		Andrew Simms	Season 5, Episode 4
1994	Wild Oats		Actor	Season 1, Episode 1
1994	One More Mountain		Milt Eliot	TV movie
1994	Second Chances		Pete Dyson	3 episodes
1995–2001	Star Trek: Voyager		Tom Paris	172 episodes; also directed 4 episodes
1999	Monster!	Co-Producer		TV movie
1999	Early Edition		Police Chief Joe Frawley	Season 3, Episode 21
2000	The Journey of Allen Strange	Director		Season 3, Episode 13
2001–2003	Dawson's Creek	Director		7 episodes
2001–2004	Star Trek: Enterprise	Director		4 episodes as director
2002	Crossing Jordan		Matt	Season 2, Episode 1
2002	The Outer Limits		Commander Ellis Ward	"The Human Factor"
2002	Everwood	Director		Season 1, Episode 10
2003–2004	One Tree Hill	Director		2 episodes
2003–2004	Dead Like Me	Director		2 episodes
2004	The Days	Director		2 episodes
2004–2005	Summerland	Director		4 episodes
2004–2007	Las Vegas	Director		4 episodes
2005–2006	The O.C.	Director		2 episodes
2005–2006	Desperate Housewives	Director		2 episodes
2005–2013	Supernatural	Director		2 episodes
2005	Eyes	Director		Season 1, Episode 5
2005	Medium	Director		Season 2, Episode 9
2006	Standoff	Director		Season 1, Episode 9
2006	My Boys	Director		Season 1, Episode 5
2006	The Danny Comden Project	Director		TV movie
2006	Jump	Director		TV movie
2007	Samantha Who?	Director		Season 1, Episode 1
2007	The Knights of Prosperity	Director		2 episodes
2007	The Nine	Director		Season 1, Episode 12
2007	What About Brian	Director and Producer		7 episodes as director, 3 episodes as producer
2007	In Case of Emergency	Director		Season 1, Episode 2
2007–2012	Chuck	Executive Producer (2010–2012); Co-Executive Producer (2010); Supervising Producer (2008–2009); Producer (2007–2008); Director (2007–2012)	Operative (#5.13)	73 episodes
2010	V	Director		Season 1, Episode 12
2012	Smash	Director		Season 1, Episode 14
2012	Breaking In	Director		Season 2, Episode 6
2012	White Collar	Director		Season 4, Episode 4
2012–2013	666 Park Avenue	Director and Co-Executive Producer		3 episodes as director, 19 episodes as co-executive producer
2013	The Mentalist	Director		3 episodes
2013–2018	Blue Bloods	Director		2 episodes
2014–2018	Girlfriends' Guide to Divorce	Director and Executive Producer		14 episodes as director, 19 episodes as executive producer
2014	Suburgatory	Director		1 episode
2014	Warehouse 13	Director		1 episode
2014	Mind Games	Director		1 episode
2015	Red Band Society	Director		1 episode
2016	Heartbeat	Director and Executive Producer		Directed "Pilot", 10 episodes as executive producer
2017	Salvation	Director		1 episode
2017–2019	The Orville	Director		2 episodes
2018–2019	The Gifted	Director and Executive Producer		3 episodes as director, 16 episodes as executive producer
2019	The Resident	Director		1 episode
2019	A Million Little Things	Director		1 episode
2019	Suits	Director		1 episode
2021–2025	Resident Alien	Director, Executive Producer and Writer		6 episodes as director, 25 episodes as executive producer, 1 episode as writer
2021	Turner & Hooch	Director and Co-Executive Producer		4 episodes
2021–2023	Star Trek: Lower Decks		Tom Paris, Nicholas Locarno	3 episodes
2022	So Help Me Todd	Director		Episode: "Second Second Chance"
2023	True Lies	Director		Episode: "Public Secrets"
2024	Alert: Missing Persons Unit	Director		Episode: "Gemma & Isabel"
2026	Stuart Fails to Save the Universe	Director		2 episodes

=== Video games ===
Year	Title	Role	Notes
2000	Star Trek: Voyager – Elite Force	Tom Paris	Voice role
2015	Star Trek Online	Tom Paris	Voice role
2026	Star Trek: Voyager – Across the Unknown	Tom Paris	Voice role
