= Slippage (short story collection) =

Collection of short stories by Harlan Ellison

- First (limited) edition
- Author: Harlan Ellison
- Cover artist: Jill Bauman
- Language: English
- Genre: Speculative fiction
- Publisher: Mark V. Ziesing (limited edition); Houghton Mifflin
- Publication date: 1997
- Publication place: United States
- Media type: Print (hardcover)
- Pages: 303
- ISBN: 0-395-35341-6
- OCLC: 37600519
- Dewey Decimal: 813/.54 21
- LC Class: PS3555.L62 S58 1997

Slippage is a collection of short stories by American author Harlan Ellison. In the introduction, Ellison introduces the concept of "slippage", or the falling apart of one's life, as the underlying theme of the book. In addition to the stories listed in the table of contents, the book includes a short narration of an unhealthy relationship with a woman named Charlotte as an example of a "slippage" in the author's life. Charlotte was the name of Ellison's first wife; they were married from 1956 to 1960.

Several of the stories in Slippage won awards. "The Man Who Rowed Christopher Columbus Ashore" was selected for inclusion in the 1993 edition of The Best American Short Stories. "Chatting With Anubis" won the Bram Stoker Award for best short story in 1995. The collection as a whole won a Locus Award for Best Collection in 1998.

Mefisto in Onyx had previously appeared as an award-winning novella with cover art by Frank Miller. It won the Bram Stoker Award in 1993 and the Locus Pool Award in 1994 for best Novella in each respective year.

Slippage includes the screenplay for "Crazy as a Soup Sandwich", which originally aired as an episode of The Twilight Zone in 1989.

== Contents ==
- Introduction: "The Fault in My Line"
- "The Man Who Rowed Christopher Columbus Ashore"
- "Anywhere But Here, With Anybody But You"
- "Crazy as a Soup Sandwich"
- "Darkness Upon the Face of the Deep"
- "The Pale Silver Dollar of the Moon Pays its Way and Makes Change"
- "The Lingering Scent of Woodsmoke"
- "The Museum on Cyclopse Avenue"
- "Go Toward the Light"
- Mefisto in Onyx
- "Where I Shall Dwell in the Next World"
- "Chatting With Anubis"
- "The Few, The Proud"
- "Sensible City"
- "The Dragon on the Bookshelf" (written in collaboration with Robert Silverberg)
- "Keyboard"
- "Jane Doe #112"
- "The Dreams a Nightmare Dreams"
- "Pulling Hard Time"
- "Scartaris, June 28"
- "She's a Young Thing and Cannot Leave Her Mother"
- "Midnight in the Sunken Cathedral"
