= Kerry Noonan =

American actress and professor (born 1960)

- Born: January 25, 1960 (age 66)
- Education: University of California, Los Angeles
- Occupations: Teacher, actress, musician
- Years active: 1982–1995
- Spouse: Stephen Wehmeyer

Kerry Noonan (born January 25, 1960) is a professor at Champlain College and a former actress. She was born in New York but spent most of her life in Los Angeles, from where she moved to Vermont in 2008.

== Acting career ==
Kerry Noonan is best known for appearing in the role of Paula Mott in Friday the 13th Part VI: Jason Lives. Her only starring role was in The Twilight Zone episode "A Message from Charity". She was initially passed up for the role, but got a call after the original lead actress turned out to be completely unsuited for the part. She also appeared in episodes of Taxi, The Facts of Life, Family Ties, Mr. Belvedere, St. Elsewhere, and Murder, She Wrote, and had recurring roles on China Beach and Knots Landing. She was a founding member of the City Stage theater company in Los Angeles, and performed in various Equity theater productions in California and Arizona from 1982–1995. She has performed with the L.A. Shakespeare Festival, the Grove Shakespeare Festival, Will & Co., the L.A. Theater Center, the Arizona Theater Company, and South Coast Repertory Theater.

== Educational career ==
Noonan received a bachelor's degree in Theater Arts from University of California, Los Angeles, sharing an acting award with Tim Robbins, and returned there after her acting career to pursue MA and Ph.D. degrees in Folklore and Mythology. Her scholarship focuses on women and religion, as well as new religious movements, and her doctoral dissertation (2002) was titled "Tongues of Fire: Catholic Charismatic Women Negotiating Gender and Power". She also taught at UCLA while a graduate student and served as a lecturer there from 2003–2008. From 2000–2008, she taught in the Anthropology Department and the Liberal Studies Department at California State University at Northridge.

Noonan specializes in Celtic folklore and folk belief and Afro-Caribbean religions. She has published articles on the Haitian Vodou spirit Gran Brijit. After visiting China in 2009, she devoted several years to research on the impact of tourism on China's 55 ethnic minority communities, and on Chinese vernacular religious beliefs and practices.

Noonan is a member of the American Folklore Society, the American Academy of Religion, and Folklorists in New England. She received the Elli Kongas-Maranda award for scholarship on women's folk culture.

Noonan has also played guitar and sung with an Irish folk band, The Descendants, later known as The McGuffins.

== Private life ==
Noonan is married to Stephen Wehmeyer, formerly of the American band Gaelic Storm.

== Filmography ==
Film

- Hot Moves (1985) – Wendy
- Friday the 13th Part VI: Jason Lives (1986) – Paula Mott
- Nightmare on the 13th Floor (1990) – Gail Myers
- The Late Shift (1996) – Letterman's Girlfriend
- Crystal Lake Memories: The Complete History of Friday the 13th (2013) – Herself

Television

- Taxi (1982) – Young Woman (1 episode)
- Family Ties (1983) – Mary Margaret (1 episode)
- St. Elsewhere (1983) – Mother (1 episode)
- The Facts of Life (1985) – Ann (1 episode)
- Murder, She Wrote (1985) – Student #2 (1 episode)
- The Twilight Zone (1985) – Charity Payne (1 episode)
- Misfits of Science (1985) – Demonstrator #1 (1 episode)
- Mr. Belvedere (1986) – Rachel Kinning (1 episode)
- A Year in the Life (1986) – Trudy (1 episode)
- Knots Landing (1990) – Kimmy (2 episodes)
- China Beach (1990) – Nellie (3 episodes)
- Win Ben Stein's Money (2002) – Herself (1 episode)
