= Examination Day =

- The Twilight Zone segment
- Scene from "Examination Day"
- Episode no.: Season 1 Episode 6a
- Directed by: Paul Lynch
- Written by: Philip DeGuere (based on the short story by Henry Slesar)
- Original air date: November 1, 1985

Guest appearances
- David Mendenhall as Dickie Jordan; Christopher Allport as Richard Jordan; Elizabeth Norment as Ruth Jordan; Ed Krieger as Clerk #1; Myrna White as Clerk #2; Jeffrey Alan Chandler as Clerk #3

Episode chronology
← Previous "Ye Gods"	Next → "A Message from Charity"

"Examination Day" is the first segment of the sixth episode of the first season of the television series The Twilight Zone. The segment is based on the short story "Examination Day" by Henry Slesar. The story was first published in Playboy (February 1958).

== Plot ==
Dickie Jordan is an intelligent and curious youth in a dystopian future. All children are required by law to undergo a government intelligence examination after their twelfth birthday. Dickie's birthday wish is to do well on his exam, which makes his parents uncomfortable.

Speaking privately on the morning of the examination, his mother is worried that Dickie is “not like the other kids”. His father tries to reassure her. Dickie’s father takes him to the government testing facility. There, Dickie is given a serum to ensure he answers the test questions truthfully.

While waiting nervously at home, Dickie's parents are contacted by the testing service. They are told that Dickie's intelligence exceeded the government standard, and they are asked how they wish his remains to be handled.

== Reception ==
The Evening Independent wrote that the episode was "a bit predictable, but the reason for the tragic climax was a shock".
