= Ma Qui =

1991 fantasy/horror story by Alan Brennert

"Ma Qui" is a 1991 fantasy/horror story by American writer Alan Brennert. It was first published in the Magazine of Fantasy & Science Fiction.

== Plot summary ==
After an American soldier is killed in the Viet Nam War, he must find his way to the afterlife — if the ma qui, Vietnamese "angry ghosts", will let him.

The protagonist of this short story is William Anthony Collins, an American soldier who was killed while attempting to rescue his friend from snipers. Because his body was taken by the Viet Cong before his fellow soldiers could recover it, he is unable to progress to the next stage of the afterlife and wanders about Vietnam as a ghost. While traveling a trail following the Song Cai, he encounters a spirit house inhabited an old man named Phan Van Duc, who was killed by a tiger, and Phan's daughter Chau, who died childless.

After departing from the spirit house, Collins meets his old friend DePaul, floating above a river and wracked with pain. DePaul tells Collins that he (DePaul) cannot escape his predicament unless a sick child is drowned in the river as an offering. Collins, thoroughly skeptical of the matter, agrees, but only because he thinks that DePaul is being hysterical and that showing him the child will snap him out of it. After briefly getting foiled by a mirror and a doorway lined with red paper (placed to ward off spirits), Collins abducts a young boy from a local village, surprised he can pass through walls but still be able to hold the boy.

Collins brings the boy to DePaul, who then tearfully drowns the boy. Horrified, Collins attempts to rescue the boy, but it is too late. Upon seeing DePaul disappear and the ghost of the boy emerge, Collins realizes why he was able to carry the child: he is in fact a ma qui, an evil spirit who brings death and misfortune. He visits the spirit house from before, but Phan only seems puzzled, while Chau delights in his evil deeds and calls him "beloved demon", prompting Collins to run away. The story ends with Collins still wandering about Vietnam, struggling to prevent himself from slipping further into evil.

== Reception ==
"Ma Qui" won the 1991 Nebula Award for Best Short Story. Kirkus Reviews called it "wrenching".
