= Crazy as a Soup Sandwich =

- The Twilight Zone episode
- Episode no.: Season 3 Episode 28
- Directed by: Paul Lynch
- Written by: Harlan Ellison
- Original air date: April 1, 1989

Guest appearances
- Anthony Franciosa as Nino Lancaster; Wayne Robson as Arky Lochner; Susan Wright as Cassandra Fishbein; Laurie Paton as Hazel Thorne

Episode chronology
← Previous "Love Is Blind"	Next → "Special Service"

"Crazy as a Soup Sandwich" is the sixty-third episode, and the twenty-eighth episode of the third season (1988–89), of the television series The Twilight Zone. The episode was written by author Harlan Ellison. In the episode, a mob boss contends with a demon. The episode's script was adapted into a segment of the NOW Comics Twilight Zone comic book in the 1990s.

== Plot ==
A petty con man named Arky Lochner, pursued by the demon Volkerps, begs mob boss Nino Lancaster for help, even though he owes Nino $1.5 million. Arky explains that he made a deal with Volkerps to pick horse race winners in exchange for his soul. The horses all died as they crossed the finish line, either packed full of dope or due to other maladies, which caused Arky to lose all the money lent to him by Nino.

Nino decides to help Arky. First, Nino wants to know how Arky found Volkerps. Arky claims beauty shop owner Cassandra Fishbein located the demon for him. Nino threatens to drive Cassandra out of business, forcing her to call on Volkerps. Considering this a betrayal, Volkerps kills Cassandra and then turns his eyes to Nino. Arky and Nino's men flee back to headquarters. Nino arrives, saying he got away using fancy footwork. He orders his men to cover every inch of the office in lead paint. Nino then leaves to procure an item that will defeat the demon.

Nino returns with a small stone box and waits for Volkerps to arrive. As the clock strikes midnight, Volkerps appears in the office in a flash of light. Nino demands he cancel the contract with Arky. Volkerps laughs at this. Nino has Arky and his secretary close the door. He pulls something out of the stone box and uses it to strike Volkerps with bolts of energy, driving him into the stone box. Volkerps finds his father also trapped within the box. As Arky thanks Nino, Nino's eyes begin glowing, revealing that Nino is also a supernatural being.

Arky realizes that making a deal with a demon was a bad decision...but making a deal with a demon king is "as crazy as a soup sandwich."

== Reception and adaptation ==
The episode's teleplay later appeared in Ellison's short story collection Slippage. The New York Times described the screenplay as "whimsical". K.C. Locke gave "Crazy as a Soup Sandwich" a mixed review, stating that it would have been better represented in comic-book form as opposed to screenplay form. However, Locke also commented that the story does keep with the theme of the collection, and that "the teleplay...is almost as much, and in some cases more, fun than Mr. Ellison's more-traditional presentation of the story."

In 1991, the screenplay was adapted into a segment of NOW Comics' Twilight Zone comic book, illustrated by artist Neal Adams, whom Ellison personally asked for. In an interview, Ellison said that working with Adams was difficult. Ellison stated that the two would often argue over which minor details to include in the comic, describing Adams as being "even more obstinately singleminded" than he is. However, he would still work with Adams again if given the chance.
