= Special Service Medal =

Special Service Medal refers to a campaign or service medal awarded by several countries:

- Special Service Medal (Canada)
- Special Service Medal (India)
- Special Service Medal (South Vietnam)
- New Zealand Special Service Medal
- United Nations Special Service Medal
