= Kozy Books =

American publisher

Kozy Books was an American publishing firm in the late 1950s/early 1960s that specialised in pulp sleaze novels. They published about 100 books.

Kozy Books was founded by publisher John B. Musacchia and lawyer Irwin Stillman. They were initially based at 88, Franklin St, New York and later at 39, Orchard St, Manhasset, New York. Their tagline was Cozy Up With Kozy Books. Books sold for 50 cents each.

Police seized 276,178 books from Kozy, representing 39 titles, in January 1961, as part of a number of warrants against distributors and wholesalers regarding obscenity accusations. Eight were presented to the jury to review. Kozy destroyed 70,000 of the books, and the rest were returned to the defendants.

== Selected bibliography ==
- K088 - Race With Lust by Roger Normandie (1956)
- K089 - Sensuous Loves by Maurice Saden (1956)
- K090 - Burlesque Jungle by Pamela Boyer (1956)
- K091 - Web of Desire by Jacques Perdue (1956)
- K092 - Tormented Passions by Roger Normandie (1956)
- K093 - Fallen Virtues by Marty Brown (1956)
- K094 - Sins of Flesh by Orrie Hitt (1956)
- K095 - Rampant Lust by Guy Andreya (1956)
- K096 - Desire Under the Palms by Jackson Mitchell (1958)
- K097 - Price of a Virgin by Lew Lessing (1958)
- K098 - Strange Love by Jacques Perdue (1960)
- K099 - Hotel Hostess by Orrie Hitt (1960)
- K100 - Sextories by Charles Miron (1960)
- K101 - 2-4 Sex by Adam Snavely (1960)
- K102 - Lover Come Lately by Lew Lessing (1960)
- K103 - The Nude Senorita by Jackson Mitchell (1960)
- K104 - The Mad and the Damned by Robert Turner (1960)
- K105 - Too Many Loves by Eric Thomas (1960)
- K106 - Summer Islanders by Lloyd Allen (1960)
- K107 - Savage Sinner by Mike Richardson (1960)
- K108 - Suburban Interlude by Orrie Hitt (1960)
- K109 - Ski Gigolo by Lew Lessing (1960)
- K110 - Tropic Temptation by Jason Fleece (1960)
- K111 - Split-Level Love by Adam Snavely (1960)
- K112 - There Are No Angels by Richard Sargent (1960)
- K113 - Lost Passions by Gene Harvey (1960)
- K114 - Love Under Water by Jackson Mitchell (1960)
- K115 - North Beach Nymph by Lew Lessing (1960)
- K116 - Temptress by Michael St John (1960)
- K117 - Strip for Murder by Eric Thomas (1960)
- K118 - Fury by Jonathon Ward (1960)
- K119 - Virgin of Spare Rib Hill by Craig Barstow (1960)
- K120 - Sin College by Eric Thomas (1960)
- K121 - Diploma Dolls by Orrie Hitt (1960)
- K122 - The Big Flick by Adam Snavely (1960)
- K123 - The Love Seekers by Jack Matcha (1961)
- K124 - Bait by Adam Snavely (1961)
- K125 - Love is a Three Letter Word by Eric Thomas (1961)
- K126 - Passion Island by Owen Gault (1961)
- K127 - Loose Women by Walter Feldspar (1961)
- K128 - Dark Passions by Orrie Hitt (1961)
- K129 - Love Lottery by Lew Lessing (1961)
- K130 - Pool-Side Pushover by Adam Snavely (1961)
- K131 - Wayside 609 by Owen Gault (1961)
- K132 - Squeeze Play by Walter Feldspar (1961)
- K133 - Body of a Young Woman by Aaron Shirley (1961)
- K134 - Twisted Lovers by Orrie Hitt (1961)
- K135 - Tina by Jim Ruse (1961)
- K136 - Father of the Amazons by Pete Lewis (1961)
- K137 - Reaped Loves by Kirby Lord (1961)
- K138 - The Lady of the Line by Craig Barstow (1961)
- K139 - The City of Hoke by Shelly Lowenkopf (1961)
- K140 - The Abortionist by Aaron Bell (1961)
- K141 - Suburban Trap by Orrie Hitt (1961)
- K142 - Pleasure Ground by Orrie Hitt (1961)
- K143 - Carnival Honey by Orrie Hitt (1962)
- K144 - Born to be Made by John B. Thompson (1962)
- K145 - Wild Lovers by Orrie Hitt (1962)
- K146 - Man For Hire by Michael Hurley (1962)
- K147 - Entangled Loves by Jack Gates (1962)
- K148 - The Girl with the Golden G-String by Ben Berkey (1962)
- K149 - Love of the Lion by Shelly Lowenkopf (1962)
- K150 - Swamp Nymph by John B. Thompson (1962)
- K151 - Bold Affair by Orrie Hitt (1962)
- K153 - Love is Fun by Robert Bledsoe (1962)
- K154 - Water Witch by Bowie Morton (1962)
- K155 - The Trouble With Red Heads by Dallas Mayo(1962)
- K158 - Kiss or Kill by John B. Thompson (1962)
- K159 - The Naked Flesh by Orrie Hitt (1962)
- K160 - Wine Women and Love by Adam Snavely (1962)
- K161 - Madame by Ben Berkey (1962)
- K165 - Nymph in Need by John B. Thompson (1962)
- K171 - Frenchie by Aaron Bell (1962)
- K177 - Love Peeper by Ben Anderton (1963)
- K179 - Blondes Don't Give a Damn by Michael Skinner (1963)
