= Michael Conner =

American writer

Michael Conner, publishing as Mike Conner from c. 1980, is an American science fiction writer. He won the 1991 Nebula Award for the novelette "Guide Dog". He is from Oakland, California.

== Bibliography ==
- "Extinction of Confidence, the Exercise of Honesty", New Constellations, ed. Thomas M. Disch and Charles Naylor (1976);
- I Am Not the Other Houdini (1978);
- "Last", New Dimension 9, Robert Silverberg, ed. (1979);
- "The Night Stair", The Magazine of Fantasy and Science Fiction, January 1982;
- "Stillborn", The Magazine of Fantasy and Science Fiction, March 1982;
- "The Corsican Box", The Magazine of Fantasy and Science Fiction, December 1982;
- "Below the Camel Barns", The Magazine of Fantasy and Science Fiction, September 1983;
- Groupmind (1984);
- "Five Mercies", The Magazine of Fantasy and Science Fiction, March 1984;
- "Fergussen's Wraith, The Magazine of Fantasy and Science Fiction, August 1985;
- Eye of the Sun (1988);
- "Guide Dog", The Magazine of Fantasy and Science Fiction, May 1991;
- "The Mystery Spot", The Magazine of Fantasy and Science Fiction, January 1992;
- "East of the Moon", The Magazine of Fantasy and Science Fiction, September 1993;
- Archangel (1995).
