= Paul Chitlik =

American screenwriter

Paul Chitlik is an American screenwriter, author, television, producer, and director. He was born in Cleveland, Ohio.

== Early life ==
He wrote and directed his first play when he was eleven. He moved with his family to Long Beach, California, when he was thirteen. Though he felt out of place for most of the first year in Long Beach, he eventually became student body president of his high school, claiming he ran because one of the perks of office was to crown and kiss the homecoming queen.

During the 1960s, Chitlik attended the University of California, Berkeley, as an undergraduate. As a junior, he spent a year at the University of Madrid under the auspices of the UC Education Abroad Program. After graduating, he entered the PhD program in comparative literature at UCSD, then transferred to UC, Berkeley, once again. He returned to Spain after a year where he lived and worked in Madrid. It was there that he also published his first work in any language - a Spanish poem.

After a year in Madrid, Chitlik migrated to London where he worked as a translator, photographer, and journalist for several years after the traditional writer’s series of jobs – stock boy in a deli, baker, house cleaner, house painter, and, eventually consultant for famed publisher Calder & Boyars. Eventually he worked as a reporter for the Jewish Telegraphic Agency. He also freelanced as a photographer and journalist. His photographs and articles appeared in English, Welsh, Spanish, US, and Israeli periodicals.

When he returned to Los Angeles he worked as a technical translator and E.S.L. instructor at Long Beach Community College. Soon, he was an administrator devising programs for non-literate students in the Indo-Chinese Refugee Assistance Program. His work with non-literate adults who often did not even have a written language of their own led to his being a consultant for the state funded Dissemination Network for Adult Educators teaching other teachers how to deal with this new population.

During this time he was also on the board of directors of La Escuela Laboral, a bilingual school for adults in East Los Angeles, and the Human Powered Transit Association, a bicycle advocacy group. He was responsible for the creation of the HPTA's bicycle safety program in the L.A. Unified School District. He also served as executive director of AVAZ International Dance Theatre. He was appointed by Governor Jerry Brown to attend the first White House Conference on Library and Information Services.

After moving to Burbank with his then wife, Mari Devon, Chitlik served on the School Facilities Committee of Burbank, overseeing the expenditure of $200 million in the rebuilding of the city’s schools for ten years, nine as chair. He also served as President and kitchen supervisor of Project Chicken Soup, an organization that provides kosher meals to people with HIV/AIDS.

Chitlik and Devon divorced in 1998. He married Beth McCauley in 2010. He now lives in Chapel Hill, NC.

== Career ==
In 1984 he wrote his second play, “Casanova Goldberg,” which received a staged reading in Los Angeles, but before it could be produced, Chitlik did a career about-face and began to write for television, first as the executive story editor for a syndicated series, "Guilty or Innocent," and later as a staff writer with writing partner, Jeremy Bertrand Finch, for the Showtime series,"Brothers." Chitlik and Finch wrote for CBS' "The Twilight Zone," "Who's the Boss?," and NBC's "Amen."

Chitlik joined the Writers Guild of America, west, in 1986, and has been an active member since, serving on the Academic Liaison Committee, the Publications Board, and, most recently, on the Writers with Disabilities Committee. In 1999 he assisted the Guild’s public affairs office in their lobbying efforts in Sacramento, Los Angeles, and Burbank. In 2009, he produced the first Hollywood Disabilities Forum featuring Peter Farrelly and Ricky Gervais at UCLA, under the auspices of the WGA and the Screen Actors Guild.

When The Twilight Zone was revived for syndication, Chitlik and Finch were brought on board by Executive Producer Mark Shelmerdine to set the direction and tone of the program as story editors. The show has gone on to prove itself a ratings success and takes its place alongside the original as innovative and stimulating programming. Chitlik and Finch won a Writers Guild of America award nomination for one of the "Twilight Zone" episodes they wrote during this time.

Chitlik and Finch developed "Poltergeist" for television for a partnership of MGM, Paragon Pictures, and ARD Television of Germany; sold a romantic comedy to Bay Productions of Vancouver; created a sit-com for Republic Pictures; wrote a pilot for "Lifetime;" and developed "Alcohol Lake," a story of hope and cultural re-awakening of Native Americans, with KCET for American Playhouse.

Chitlik went on to be coordinating producer for “Real Stories of the Highway Patrol,” one of the most successful first run daily strip programs on television. In addition to overseeing the story development, scripting, directing, and editing of over 260 reenactment segments, he field produced and directed more than a dozen himself. From Real Stories, Chitlik went to “U.S. Customs Classified” a syndicated series starring Stephen J. Cannell. There he supervised 22 hours of programming.

For Rysher Entertainment, Chitlik wrote “Youngsters,” designed as a starring vehicle for the Olsen twins. He has also written features for a number of independent companies including Promark Entertainment, Nu Image, and Mainline Releasing, one of which won a Genesis Award for outstanding children’s movie.

Chitlik wrote and produced “Alien Abduction – The McPherson Tape”, a movie for television for UPN and Dick Clark Productions, for whom he has written episodes of “Beyond Belief.” He also contributed episodes to “Los Beltrán,” a Spanish language sitcom for Telemundo, for which he has been nominated for a GLAAD Media Award. He wrote, produced, and directed the Travel Channel special, “Ringling Brothers Revealed.” Most recently he wrote, produced, and directed "The Wedding Dress," a feature originally viewable on Amazon Prime.

Early in 2000 Chitlik began teaching screenwriting in UCLA'S Professional Program in Screenwriting. Soon he was teaching in UCLA Extension's program in screenwriting, then in UCLA's MFA program in screenwriting where he was an visiting assistant professor. A few years later he began teaching comedy writing at Loyola Marymount University where he eventually became a clinical associate professor teaching full time. He also founded private writing retreats in Italy, Spain, and France. He has taught workshops at universities in Venezuela, Cuba, Chile, Australia, and Mexico. In 2016, he founded Loyola Marymount's study abroad program for screenwriters in Budapest, Hungary, at the Budapest Film School and Etvos Lorand University.

== Books ==
The Screenwriting Sensei: A complete guide to writing your first script (2025) Lies, All Lies (2024) Rewrite : a step-by-step guide to strengthen structure, characters, and drama in your screenplay (1st ed., 2008; 2nd ed., 2013) 39 Steps to Better Screenwriting (2014) Berns with an "E" (1997, 2011) Rug Berns (2009, 2011) Deviant Numbers (1998, 2011)
