= Alan Brennert =

American author and TV producer (born 1954)

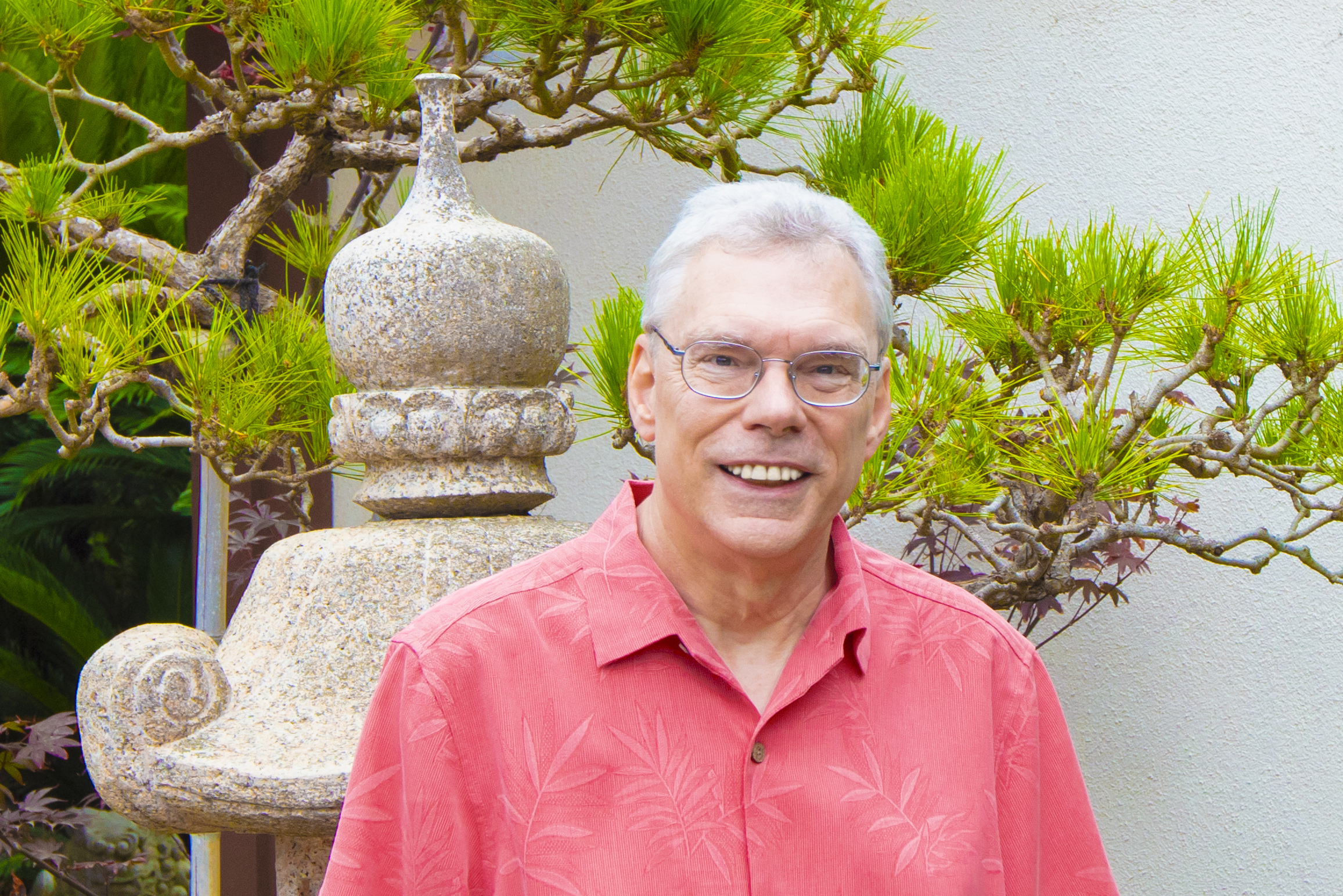
- Brennert in 2018
- Born: May 30, 1954 (age 72); Englewood, New Jersey, U.S.
- Education: California State University, Long Beach (BA)
- Writing career
- Pen name: Michael Bryant
- Notable works: L.A. Law; The Twilight Zone
- Notable awards: 1991 Emmy Award for Outstanding Drama Series; 1991 Nebula Award for Best Short Story

Alan Brennert (born May 30, 1954) is an American author, television producer, and screenwriter.

== Early life and education ==
Brennert was born in Englewood, New Jersey, to Herbert E. Brennert, an aviation writer, and Almyra E. Brennert. He has lived in Southern California since 1973, earned a Bachelor of Arts degree in English from California State University, Long Beach, and did graduate work in screenwriting at the University of California, Los Angeles.

== Career ==
=== Television ===
Alan Brennert's earliest television work was in 1978 when he wrote several scripts for the Wonder Woman series. He was story editor for the NBC series Buck Rogers in the 25th Century and wrote seven scripts for that series. He won an Emmy Award as a producer and writer for L.A. Law in 1991. For fans of science fiction and fantasy, he might be best known as a writer for the revival series The Twilight Zone and The Outer Limits. One of his best regarded episodes was for The Twilight Zone, "Her Pilgrim Soul", which became a play. Brennert said that writing "Her Pilgrim Soul" was a deeply cathartic experience which allowed him to get past the death of a woman he had loved. He also wrote two The Twilight Zone teleplays based on stories by Harlan Ellison, who later said that Brennert was the only writer he would ever allow to adapt his works. Since 2001 Brennert has written episodes of the television series Star Trek: Enterprise (under the name of Michael Bryant) and Stargate Atlantis.

=== Prose ===
Brennert also writes short stories and novels. His first story, "Nostalgia Tripping", was published in 1973. In 1975 he was nominated for the John W. Campbell Award for Best New Writer in Science Fiction. He won a Nebula Award for Best Short Story in 1991 and had stories in Gardner Dozois's Year's Best volumes. His 2003 book Moloka'i is a historical novel that focuses on life in Honolulu and the leper colony at Kalaupapa in Hawaii made famous by Father Damien, Mother Marianne Cope, and Lawrence M. Judd, historical people who appear in the novel set in the early 1900s. It received mostly favorable reviews. The decision to write Moloka'i came after a four-hour miniseries Brennert wrote for NBC was not picked up. According to his website, Brennert wanted to "write something that people would get to see." In 2009, Brennert returned to Hawaii in Honolulu, a historical novel centering on a Korean picture bride in the early 1900s. The story told in Honolulu came out of Brennert's research from Moloka'i. He released Daughter of Moloka'i, the sequel of Moloka'i, in February 2019.

=== Comic books ===
Brennert's first work in the comics industry was conducting interviews with A. E. van Vogt, Larry Niven, and Theodore Sturgeon which were published in Marvel Comics' Unknown Worlds of Science Fiction comics magazine. His first comics story was plotting DC Comics' Wonder Woman #231 (May 1977) and #232 (June 1977) which were scripted by Martin Pasko. Brennert and Pasko collaborated again on Star Trek #12 (March 1981) for Marvel. That same month, he and artist Dick Giordano crafted the lead Batman story for Detective Comics #500. This story, "To Kill a Legend", was included in DC's "Year's Best Comics Stories" of 1981 collection. Brennert then wrote four issues of The Brave and the Bold featuring Batman team-ups with the Creeper, the Hawk and Dove, the Robin of Earth Two, and the Catwoman. Editor Dennis O'Neil had him write Daredevil #192 (March 1983), which followed Frank Miller's run on that title. Due to his television schedule, Brennert did not have the time to write any additional comic books for several years. A Deadman story in Christmas with the Super-Heroes #2 (1989) was his next work in the comics industry, followed by a Black Canary tale in Secret Origins vol. 2 #50 (Aug. 1990). He wrote Batman: Holy Terror, the first DC comic book to feature the Elseworlds logo, and a "Batman Black and White" backup feature in Batman: Gotham Knights #10 (December 2000) drawn by José Luis García-López. His last comics story was Marvel Snapshots: Sub-Mariner #1 (March 2020).

In 2014, Brennert "requested equity in the [Barbara Kean Gordon] character and compensation for her use" in the Gotham television series due to having introduced the character in Detective Comics #500. DC Comics and parent company Warner Bros. denied the request claiming that the character was "derivative" of an already existing DC character.

Tales of the Batman: Alan Brennert, a hardcover collection of Brennert's work for DC Comics, was published in 2016. He has named "The Autobiography of Bruce Wayne" from The Brave and the Bold #197 (April 1983) as his personal favorite of his DC stories.

== Authorship and screenwriting ==
=== Novels and short story collections ===
- City of Masques (1978) ISBN 978-0872164567
- Kindred Spirits (1984) ISBN 978-0312872625
- Time and Chance (1990) ISBN 978-0312931926
- Her Pilgrim Soul: And Other Stories (1990) ISBN 978-0312851019
- Moloka'i (2001) ISBN 978-1435291065
- Honolulu (2009) ISBN 978-0312360405
- Palisades Park (2013) ISBN 978-0312643720
- Daughter of Moloka'i (2019) ISBN 9781250137661

=== Comic books ===
==== DC Comics ====
- Wonder Woman #231–232 (1977)
- The Brave and the Bold #178, 181–182, 197 (1981–1983)
- Detective Comics #500, 600 (1981–1989)
- Christmas with the Super-Heroes #2 (Deadman) (1989)
- Secret Origins vol. 2 #50 (Black Canary) (1990)
- Batman: Holy Terror (Elseworlds) (1991)
- Batman: Gotham Knights #10 ("Batman Black and White") (2000)

==== Marvel Comics ====
- Unknown Worlds of Science Fiction #4–5, Special #1 (text articles) (1975–1976)
- Star Trek #12 (1981)
- Daredevil #192 (1983)
- Sub-Mariner: Marvels Snapshot #1 (2020)

=== Television and film ===
- Wonder Woman (1978–1979)
- Buck Rogers in the 25th Century (1979–1980)
- The Mississippi (1984)
- Simon & Simon (1983–1985)
- The Twilight Zone (1985–1989)
- China Beach (1989)
- L.A. Law (1991–1992)
- The Outer Limits (1995–1997, 2001)
- The Lake (1998)
- Odyssey 5 (2002)
- Star Trek: Enterprise (2004–2005)
- Stargate Atlantis (2005)

== Awards and nominations ==
Year	Awarding body	Category	Result	Work	Notes
1975	John W. Campbell Award	Best New Writer	Nominated		
1982	Writers Guild of America Awards	Episodic Drama	Nominated	"Closed Circuit" – Darkroom	
1986	Writers Guild of America Awards	Anthology Episode / Single Program	Nominated	"Her Pilgrim Soul" – The Twilight Zone	
1989	Writers Guild of America Awards	Episodic Drama	Nominated	"Where the Boys Are" – China Beach	
1991	Emmy Awards	Outstanding Drama Series	Won	L.A. Law	Shared with fellow producers Rick Wallace, David E. Kelley, John Hill, Robert Breech, James C. Hart, Elodie Keene, Patricia Green, Alice West
1991	Emmy Awards	Outstanding Writing for a Drama Series	Nominated	"Mutinies on the Banzai" – L.A. Law	Shared with co-writers Patricia Green and David E. Kelley
1991	Nebula Award	Best Short Story	Won	"Ma Qui"	
1991	People's Choice Awards	Drama Show of the Year	Won	L.A. Law	
1992	Emmy Awards	Outstanding Drama Series	Nominated	L.A. Law	Shared with fellow producers Rick Wallace, Steven Bochco, Patricia Green, Carol Flint, Elodie Keene, James C. Hart, Robert Breech, Don Behrns
1992	Theodore Sturgeon Award		2nd Place	"Ma Qui"	
1998	Theodore Sturgeon Award		Shortlist	"Echoes"	
