= The Twilight Zone (1985 TV series) =

American anthology television series (1985–1989)

- Genre: Science fiction; Horror; Fantasy; Thriller
- Created by: Rod Serling
- Narrated by: Charles Aidman; Robin Ward
- Theme music composer: Jerry Garcia; Bob Weir; Brent Mydland; Phil Lesh; Mickey Hart; Bill Kreutzmann; Merl Saunders; Marius Constant (original theme)
- Opening theme: "The Twilight Zone '85 Main Title" performed by Grateful Dead
- Countries of origin: United States; Canada
- Original language: English
- No. of seasons: 3
- No. of episodes: 65 (list of episodes)

Production
- Running time: 45–48 minutes (seasons 1–2); 22–24 minutes (three episodes from season 2, and all of season 3)
- Production companies: CBS Entertainment Productions (1985–87) (seasons 1–2); Persistence of Vision (1985–87) (seasons 1–2); London Films; CBS Broadcast International (1988–89) (season 3); Atlantis Films (1988–89) (season 3)

Original release
- Network: CBS
- Release: September 27, 1985 – July 17, 1987
- Network: First-run syndication
- Release: September 24, 1988 – April 15, 1989

Related
- The Twilight Zone (1959–64); The Twilight Zone (2002–03); The Twilight Zone (2019–20)

The Twilight Zone is an anthology television series that aired from September 27, 1985, to April 15, 1989. It is the first of three revivals of Rod Serling's 1959–64 television series, and like the original it featured a variety of speculative fiction, commonly containing characters from a seemingly normal world stumbling into paranormal circumstances. Unlike the original, however, most episodes contained multiple self-contained stories instead of just one. The voice-over narrations were still present, but were not a regular feature as they were in the original series; some episodes had only an opening narration, some had only a closing narration, and some had no narration at all. The multi-segment format liberated the series from the usual time constraints of episodic television, allowing stories ranging in length from eight minutes to 40 minutes. The series ran for two seasons on CBS before producing a final season for syndication.

== Series history ==
After the original Twilight Zone series ended in 1964, Rod Serling sold the rights to the series to CBS, which allowed for a revival of the show by the network. As an in-house production, they stood to earn more money producing The Twilight Zone than they could by purchasing a new series produced by an outside company. Even so, the network was slow to consider a revival, shooting down offers from the original production team of Rod Serling and Buck Houghton and later from American filmmaker Francis Ford Coppola. Their hesitation stemmed from concerns familiar to the original series: The Twilight Zone had never been the breakaway hit CBS wanted, so they should not expect it to do better in a second run. "We were looking at the success of the original series in syndication and the enormous popularity of the Steven Spielberg films," said CBS program chief Harvey Shepard. "Many of them (such as E.T. or Poltergeist) deal with elements of the show. Perhaps the public is ready for it again."

Despite the lukewarm response to Twilight Zone: The Movie, a theatrical homage to the original series directed by a quartet of directors headed by John Landis and Steven Spielberg, CBS decided to move forward with a new Twilight Zone series under the supervision of Carla Singer, the CBS Vice President of Drama Development in 1984. Writers and filmmakers involved included Harlan Ellison, George R. R. Martin, Rockne S. O'Bannon, Jeremy Bertrand Finch, Paul Chitlik and directors Wes Craven and William Friedkin. Casts featured such stars as Bruce Willis, Helen Mirren, Shelley Duvall, Season Hubley, Morgan Freeman, Martin Landau, Piper Laurie, Janet Leigh, Tom Skerritt, Ralph Bellamy, Louise Fletcher, Martin Balsam, William Atherton, Richard Mulligan, Danny Kaye, Norman Lloyd, Jonathan Frakes, Frances McDormand, John Carradine, Victor Garber, Maury Chaykin, Donald Moffat, Melinda Dillon, Tess Harper, George Wendt, Charles Martin Smith, Adrienne Barbeau and Fred Savage, among many others.

New theme music was composed and performed by Grateful Dead with Merl Saunders, incorporating elements of the classic theme to the original Twilight Zone by Marius Constant (used in seasons 2–5). Grateful Dead also provided incidental music for a number of episodes.

Rod Serling had died in 1975, so he was not available to narrate the new series; this was done instead by Charles Aidman—himself the star of two classic Twilight Zone episodes. The new series ran for three seasons. Most episodes presented two or three stories within the one-hour time slot. Four episodes in season 2 were 30 minutes long, and a third season of half-hour episodes was produced in 1988 to expand the series' syndication package. Robin Ward replaced Aidman as the narrator of these Canadian-produced episodes. Unlike Serling in the original series, neither Aidman nor Ward appear on-screen (Serling's image appears fleetingly in the revival's opening credits, however.) Subsequent revivals would return to having on-screen hosts; Forest Whitaker would host the 2002 series, and Jordan Peele would host the 2019 revival.

=== First season (1985–86) ===
The Twilight Zone debuted the night of September 27, 1985 to a warm reception: it won its Friday-night time slot in four of its first five weeks. Episodes featured adaptations of stories by Harlan Ellison (whose "Shatterday", adapted by Alan Brennert, launched the new series), Greg Bear, Ray Bradbury, Arthur C. Clarke, Robert McCammon, and Stephen King. In contrast to Twilight Zone: The Movie, which relied primarily on remakes of classic Twilight Zone episodes in order to tap the nostalgia market, content for the new The Twilight Zone consisted almost entirely of new stories and adaptations of stories which had never before been brought to the television screen.

Animator Gary Gutierrez designed the visual images used in the title sequence, including the ghostly Rod Serling, which he created by projecting Serling's image onto nitrogen. After the images were completed, the footage was taken to a recording studio, where the Grateful Dead both composed and recorded the title music in a late night recording session.

"Paladin of the Lost Hour", an episode written by Harlan Ellison, won the 1987 Writers Guild of America Award for Anthology Episode/Single Program.

Executive producer Philip Deguere stated that CBS initially told him the show would air at 10 P.M., and therefore the earliest episodes were written with that time slot in mind. The late and unexpected rescheduling of the show to the 8 PM time slot (widely known as Family Viewing Hour, during which most viewers expect to be able to tune in with their whole family to shows which are appropriate for all ages) was considered by Deguere to be inappropriate given the content of the early episodes. He noted that the show dropped from a 30 share to a 22 share between episodes 4 and 5, and attributed this to episode 4 including the segment "Nightcrawlers", which he considered one of the most violent and disturbing works to have aired on television at the time.

Ellison, an extremely vocal critic of television, had already published two collections of essays on the subject, "concluding that to work in television is akin to putting in time in the Egyptian House of the Dead." These feelings surfaced once again when the script he submitted for Twilight Zone's Christmas special—an adaptation of Donald E. Westlake's 1964 story "Nackles", in which an obnoxious and mean-spirited drunk frightens his children with stories of a malicious anti-Santa Claus—was rejected by CBS' West Coast Program Practices. The segment, which was to be Ellison's directorial debut, was halted in mid-production. This cost the program between $150,000 and $300,000 and Ellison's services as a creative consultant. "[Their] suggestions were vile, infamous!" Ellison recalled of his aborted attempts to change the network's mind.

The "Nackles" incident generated a flurry of press which ultimately proved inadequate to revive public interest in the series. "I can see why people who were expecting The Twilight Zone were disappointed with it," said staff writer Michael Cassutt of the show's low ratings. "...our show always seemed uneven to me. There were episodes perfectly in keeping with The Twilight Zone spirit, and then others that could have been from The Outer Limits or from anything." Despite poor ratings, The Twilight Zone was renewed for a second season in early 1986.

=== Second season (1986–87) ===
The series debuted in an hour-long format, but was put on hiatus only a few weeks into the second season. CBS had moved the series to Saturday nights, which led to falling ratings. When The Twilight Zone returned in December, the episodes were half-hour shows, and generally contained only one story. Some episodes, such as "The Road Less Traveled", were produced for the hour format and then cut down for the half-hour broadcast. According to writer Alan Brennert, CBS was looking for a way to save the series from its ratings slump and took inspiration from the fact that the one season of the original The Twilight Zone which used the hour format instead of the half-hour format had the worst ratings of the series.

The series was cancelled by February, with remaining episodes being burned off over the summer as hour-long multi-story episodes. Season 2 only ran for 11 episodes; several of the unproduced episodes would be filmed for season 3. In regard to writing for the episode "The Girl I Married", J. M. DeMatteis commented "I have a feeling that the show that appears will not bear much relation to what I wrote. What I've found out is that this season—unlike last, where the script was pretty much regarded as sacrosanct—the network is really interfering a lot. [...] Regardless, I know I did a good job and it was a real satisfying experience."

=== Third season (1988–89) ===
CBS replaced the original production team, and set out to do thirty 22-minute episodes for the third season; this way they could have enough episodes to sell the series into syndication. Robin Ward replaced Aidman as the narrator of these Canadian-produced episodes, and he also re-recorded Aidman's narration when the CBS episodes were edited for inclusion in the syndication package. To lead the writing team, the producers brought in a new group led by executive producer Mark Shelmerdine (I, Claudius) and supported by story editors Paul Chitlik, Jeremy Bertrand Finch, and J. Michael Straczynski. Straczynski authored more episodes that season than anyone else on staff. The producers named Straczynski the sole story editor following the release of Chitlik and Finch. Harlan Ellison was coaxed back to The Twilight Zone in the third season, and wrote what would be the third-to-last episode of the series, titled "Crazy as a Soup Sandwich".

== Home media ==
Image Entertainment has released The Twilight Zone on DVD in Region 1. Season 1 was released on December 28, 2004, and Seasons 2 and 3 were released together in a 7-Disc DVD on June 28, 2005. Image re-released all three seasons together with the remastered original series in a 41-disc box set on August 26, 2014. On February 7, 2017, CBS Home Entertainment (distributed by Paramount) released "The Complete 80s Series" 13-disc box set.

In Region 2, Cinema Club UK has released all three seasons on DVD in the UK. Season 1 was released on September 19, 2005, on 6 DVDs, Season 2 on December 23, 2005, on 4 DVDs, and Season 3 on May 12, 2006, on 4 DVDs.

In Region 4, Shock Entertainment has released the entire series on DVD in Australia. All 3 seasons were released on June 1, 2011. On October 3, 2012, Shock released a complete series box set.

Alan Brennert, one of the writer-producers who contributed to the series, wrote that the picture quality of the DVD set was "NOT a 'bad transfer'" but rather that the episodes were "shot on film, but edited on video. In other words, the raw footage was 35 mm film, which was then transferred to videotape. Editing, dubbing, special effects—everything was done on video. We were in fact the first drama series on television to do this. So unlike the original Rod Serling TZ, there are no original film negatives from which Image could strike new prints for transfer. All that exist are the old one-inch master tapes, and the unfortunate reality is, videotape does deteriorate some over time. Image has, in my opinion, done a superb job packaging our series, and it is to them that I award the five stars in this review! If not for their interest in bringing this show to DVD, those one-inch masters might eventually have eroded into so much static (as my 3/4-inch tapes of the show already have)." He concluded by saying "If you enjoyed this series, just be grateful it's been preserved!"

== See also ==
- List of The Twilight Zone (1985 TV series) episodes
- The Twilight Zone (2002 TV series)
- The Twilight Zone (2019 TV series)
