= Kate Wilhelm bibliography =

A list of works by or about Kate Wilhelm, American author.

== Novels ==
- More Bitter Than Death (1962)
- The Mile-Long Spaceship (1963)
- The Clone (1965), co-written with Theodore L. Thomas
- The Nevermore Affair (1966)
- Andover and the Android (1966)
- The Killing Thing (1967)
- Let the Fire Fall (1969)
- The Year of the Cloud (1970), co-written with Theodore L. Thomas
- Margaret and I (1971)
- City of Cain (1974)
- Where Late the Sweet Birds Sang (1976)
- The Clewiston Test (1976)
- Fault Lines (1977)
- Juniper Time (1979)
- A Sense of Shadow (1981)
- Oh, Susannah! (1982)
- Welcome, Chaos (1983)
- Huysman's Pets (1985)
- Crazy Time (1988)
- Cambio Bay (1990)
- Justice for Some (1993)
- The Good Children (1998)
- The Deepest Water (2000)
- Skeletons: A Novel of Suspense (2002)
- The Price of Silence (2005)
- Death of an Artist (2012)

=== Barbara Holloway mysteries ===
- Death Qualified: A Mystery of Chaos (1991)
- The Best Defense (1994)
- For the Defense also named Malice Prepense in hardbound editions (1996)
- Defense for the Devil (1999)
- No Defense (2000)
- Desperate Measures (2001)
- Clear and Convincing Proof (2003)
- The Unbidden Truth (2004)
- Sleight Of Hand (2006)
- A Wrongful Death (2007)
- Cold Case (2008)
- Heaven is High (2011)
- By Stone, By Blade, By Fire (2012)
- Mirror, Mirror (2017)

=== Constance Leidl and Charlie Meiklejohn mysteries ===
- The Hamlet Trap (1987)
- The Dark Door (1988)
- Smart House (1989)
- Sweet, Sweet Poison (1990)
- Seven Kinds of Death (1992)
- Whisper Her Name (2012)

Collections

- A Flush of Shadows: Five Short Novels (1995) – includes "With Thimbles, With Forks, and Hope", "Torch Song", "All for One", "Sister Alice", and "Gorgon Fields"
- The Casebook of Constance and Charlie Volume 1 (1999) – includes "The Hamlet Trap", "Smart House", and "Seven Kinds of Death"
- The Casebook of Constance and Charlie Volume 2 (2000) – includes "Sweet, Sweet Poison" and "The Dark Door", plus shorter stories "Christ's Tears", "Torch Song", and "An Imperfect Gift"

Short Stories

- "Christ's Tears" April 1996
- "An Imperfect Gift" Aug 1999
- "His Deadliest Enemy" Mar/Apr2004

== Poetry ==
Collections

- Alternatives (1980)
- Four Seasons (1980)
- No One Listens (1980)
- The Eagle (1980)

== Short fiction ==
Collections

- The Downstairs Room (1968)
- Abyss: Two Novellas (1971) – contains "The Plastic Abyss" (1992 Nebula Award nominee, Best Novella) and "Stranger in the House"
- The Infinity Box (1975) – collection of 9 SF short stories, including 1992 Nebula Award nominee "The Infinity Box", for Best Novella
- Somerset Dreams and Other Fiction (1978)
- The Winter Beach (1981)
- Listen, Listen (1981) – contains four novellas: "Julian", "With Thimbles, With Forks and Hope", "Moongate", and "The Uncertain Edge of Reality"
- Children of the Wind (1989) – contains "Children of the Wind", "The Gorgon Field" (1986 Nebula Award nominee, Best Novella), "A Brother to Dragons, A Companion of Owls", "The Blue Ladies", and "The Girl Who Fell into the Sky"
- And the Angels Sing (1992) – collection of 12 SF short stories
- Fear is a Cold Black (2010) – collection of Wilhelm's early SF short stories
- Music Makers (2012) – collection of 5 stories: "Music Makers", "Shadows on the Wall of the Cave", "Mockingbird", "The Late Night Train", and "An Ordinary Day with Jason"
- The Bird Cage (2012) – collection of 4 stories: "The Bird Cage", "Changing the World", "The Fountain of Neptune", and "Rules of the Game"

Anthologies (edited)

- Clarion SF
- Nebula Award Stories 9

Stories

Title	Year	First published	Reprinted/collected	Notes
The late night train	2010	Wilhelm, Kate (January–February 2010). "The late night train". F&SF. 118 (1&2): 179–186.		

- Baby, You Were Great (1967)
- The Planners (1968)
- April Fool's Day Forever (1970)
- A Cold Dark Night with Snow (1970)
- Forever Yours, Anna (1987)
- Naming the Flowers (1992)
- I Know What You're Thinking (1994)

== Non-fiction ==
- Storyteller: Writing Lessons & More from 27 Years of the Clarion Writers' Workshop (2005)
