= Desperate Measures =

Desperate Measures may refer to:

== Entertainment ==
=== Film ===
- Desperate Measures (film), a 1998 action thriller film

=== Television ===
Episodes

- "Desperate Measure", Pacific Palisades episode 8 (1997)
- "Desperate Measures", 9-1-1 season 5, episode 3 (2021)
- "Desperate Measures", Alone season 5, episode 7 (2018)
- "Desperate Measures", Big Sky (Australian) season 2, episode 11 (1999)
- "Desperate Measures", Blue Murder (British) series 4, episode 2 (2007)
- "Desperate Measures", Burden of Truth season 3, episode 4 (2020)
- "Desperate Measures", Burn Notice season 6, episode 11 (2012)
- "Desperate Measures", Casualty series 19, episode 35 (2005)
- "Desperate Measures", Deadliest Catch season 18, episode 5 (2022)
- "Desperate Measures", Diagnosis X episode 10 (2007)
- "Desperate Measures", Doctor Who season 2, episode 11; episode 2 of The Rescue (1965)
- "Desperate Measures", Dr. G: Medical Examiner season 8, episode 2 (2012)
- "Desperate Measures", G.P. season 6, episode 34 (1994)
- "Desperate Measures", Hawaii Five-0 (2010) season 1, episode 12 (2010)
- "Desperate Measures", Heartbeat (British) series 9, episode 21 (2000)
- "Desperate Measures", Holby City series 5, episode 29 (2003)
- "Desperate Measures", Ice Road Truckers season 6, episode 5 (2012)
- "Desperate Measures", I'll Fly Away season 2, episode 5 (1992)
- "Desperate Measures", Killing It season 1, episode 9 (2022)
- "Desperate Measures", Last Madame: Sisters of the Night episode 6 (2023)
- "Desperate Measures", part 2 of a Hawaii Five-0 and Magnum P.I. crossover (2020)
- "Desperate Measures", McLeod's Daughters season 2, episode 3 (2002)
- "Desperate Measures", NCIS: Hawaiʻi season 2, episode 9 (2022)
- "Desperate Measures", Night and Day series 2, episode 28–30 (2002)
- "Desperate Measures", Party of Five season 3, episode 12 (1996)
- "Desperate Measures" (Stargate SG-1) (2001)
- "Desperate Measures", Strange Sex season 2, episode 10b (2011)
- "Desperate Measures", The Bill series 9, episode 100 (1993)
- "Desperate Measures", The Brave episode 10 (2018)
- "Desperate Measures", The First 48: Missing Persons season 2, episode 2a (2012)
- "Desperate Measures", The Indian Doctor series 3, episode 3 (2013)
- "Desperate Measures" (The Night Agent) (2025)
- "Desperate Measures", Walker, Texas Ranger season 9, episode 12 (2001)
- "Desperate Measures", Web Therapy season 1, episode 2 (2011)
- "Desperate Measures", Wolfblood series 2, episode 8 (2013)
- "Desperate Measures", Yukon Men season 2, episode 4 (2016)
- "Doc Holliday: Desperate Measures", Legends & Lies season 1, episode 2 (2015)

Series

- Desperate Measures, a 2013 American TV series narrated by Orlagh Cassidy
- Desperate Measures (TV series), a 2013 Australian documentary series about Indigenous Australians
- Desperate Measures, a 2023 TV series with Amanda Abbington

== Literature ==
- Desperate Measures, a 1974 novel by Dennis Wheatley; the twelfth and final entry in the Roger Brook series
- Desperate Measures, a 1986 novel by Margot Arnold
- Desperate Measures, a 1989 novel by Joe Clifford Faust; the first entry in the Angel's Luck trilogy
- Desperate Measures, a 1989 novel by Linda Cajio; the first entry in the Kittredge Family Saga
- Desperate Measures, a 1991 novel by Sara Craven
- Desperate Measures, a 1994 novel attributed to Carolyn Keene; the eighteenth volume in the Super Mystery series
- Desperate Measures, a 1994 novel by Fern Michaels
- Desperate Measures, a 1994 novel by David Morrell
- Desperate Measures, a novelization of the 1998 film by Robert Tine
- Desperate Measures, a 2001 novel by Kate Wilhelm; the sixth entry in the Barbara Holloway Mysteries series
- Desperate Measures, a 2015 novel by Jo Bannister; the third entry in the Hazel Best & Gabriel Ash series
- Desperate Measures, a 2016 novel by Jeff Probst and Chris Tebbetts; the third entry in the Stranded: Shadow Island series
- Desperate Measures, a 2018 novel by Stuart Woods; the forty-seventh entry in the Stone Barrington series

== Music ==
- Desperate Measures (Hollywood Undead album), a 2009 album
- Desperate Measures (Leeway album), a 1991 album
- "Desperate Measures" (song), a 2012 song by Marianas Trench

== Other uses ==
- Desperate Measures (musical), a 2004 musical by David Friedman and Peter Kellogg
