= Catherine Pelonero =

American dramatist

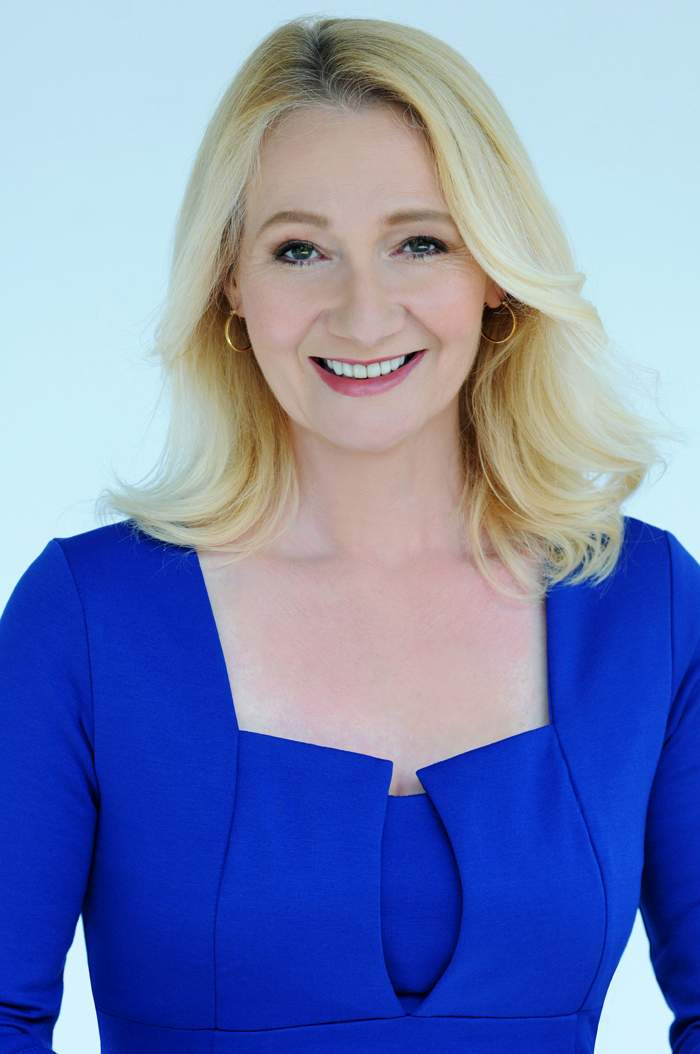
- Born: Edna Catherine Pelonero; November 7, 1967 (age 59); Alexandria, Virginia, U.S.
- Died: December 19, 2024; Los Angeles, California, U.S.
- Occupations: Author, playwright, TV commentator
- Writing career
- Genres: Non-fiction, fiction
- Subjects: True crime, biography
- Notable works: Kitty Genovese; Absolute Madness
- Website: www.catherinepelonero.net

Catherine Pelonero (born November 7, 1967 - December 19, 2024) was a playwright and a New York Times bestselling true crime author, best known for her 2014 book Kitty Genovese: A True Account of a Public Murder and Its Private Consequences.

== Early life ==
Catherine Pelonero was born on November 7, 1967, in Alexandria, Virginia, the oldest child of Salvatore J. Pelonero and Trieva (née Peay) Pelonero. Soon after, her parents moved to her father's hometown of Buffalo, New York, where her father became a police officer. Pelonero grew up in Buffalo and the surrounding Western New York area. Her nonfiction articles and books often deal with crimes that occurred in Buffalo and New York City.

== Career and education ==
Pelonero began her career as a playwright, studying with Emanuel Fried and working in local theatre in Buffalo. Her early works were comedies. She attended Buffalo State College. Her first notable success as a playwright came in 1994 with Family Names, a ten-minute play that premiered in a festival at the Nat Horne Theatre in New York City and went on to win the Off-Off-Broadway Short Play Festival. Family Names was published by Samuel French, Inc. and was subsequently produced at theatres throughout the United States, Canada, and the United Kingdom. In 2013, Pelonero developed a full-length version of Family Names that received a reading in Hollywood with a cast that included Paul Sorvino, Joseph Bologna, and Renée Taylor.

Pelonero moved to Los Angeles, in 1995. She continued writing for the theatre and also wrote teleplays and the short screenplay, Preservation Society, which won a screenwriting competition at Yale University and was filmed as a student production under the direction of filmmaker Sandra Luckow.

In 2007, Pelonero became a playwright member of the Actors Studio. Some of her plays were developed in the Studio's west coast Playwrights & Directors Unit. Her absurdist comedy, Another Effing Family Drama, premiered at the Hollywood Fringe Festival in 2011 and was chosen for Best of the Fringe.

== True crime ==
Pelonero's debut book, Kitty Genovese: A True Account of a Public Murder and Its Private Consequences, was published in 2014. The book is a detailed nonfiction account of the infamous 1964 murder of Catherine “Kitty” Genovese, a young woman stalked and stabbed on the street where she lived in Queens, New York. The book became a best seller, twice making the New York Times Best Sellers List.

Pelonero wrote several subsequent articles about the Kitty Genovese case and her extensive interviews with murderer Winston Moseley.

The success of Kitty Genovese led to offers from various news and television programs for Pelonero as an on-air true crime commentator. At Investigation Discovery's CrimeFeed, she became a contributing writer.

Her second book, Absolute Madness: A True Story of a Serial Killer, Race, and a City Divided, is a nonfiction account of the life and crimes of Joseph Christopher, a white serial killer who targeted black males during a spree across New York in 1980–81. Absolute Madness was published November 7, 2017.<r Excerpts from the book appeared in Salon magazine.

== Film and television ==
Pelonero appears in numerous true crime television programs and films, including A Crime to Remember, Fox Files, The Witness, Murderous Affairs, and It Takes a Killer.

== Published works ==
True crime
• Kitty Genovese (2014)
• Absolute Madness (2017)

Plays
• Family Names (1994, play)
• Awesome Ghosts of Ontario (2010, play)
