= The Village (short story) =

- Short story by Kate Wilhelm
- Country: America
- Language: English
- Genre(s): Science fiction short story

Publication
- Published in: Bad Moon Rising: An Anthology of Political Forebodings
- Publication type: Anthology
- Publisher: Harper & Row
- Media type: hardback
- Publication date: 1973-04-00

"The Village" is a short story by Kate Wilhelm. It was first published in the 1973 anthology Bad Moon Rising: An Anthology of Political Forebodings edited by Thomas M. Disch. It was also published in the 1977 anthology The Infinity Box and the 1987 anthology In the Field of Fire edited by Jack Dann and Jeanne Van Buren Dann.

== Reception ==
In reviewing Bad Moon Rising: An Anthology of Political Forebodings, The Magazine of Fantasy and Science Fiction editor Joanna Russ called The Village "the best piece of propaganda I have ever read." She goes on to say "it carries its own split; its subject (the war in Southeast Asia) is folded back on itself in a doubleness that is the subject of the story. This is the first time I've seen Ms. Wilhelm use slick-magazine origins of her people and places (not her treatment of them) so savagely and well. The tale, which was written several years ago, was good enough to frighten the slick magazines into rejecting it; only now does it see print."
