= Deathbird Stories =

1975 short story collection by Harlan Ellison

- First edition cover
- Author: Harlan Ellison
- Illustrator: Leo and Diane Dillon
- Language: English
- Genre: Speculative fiction
- Publisher: Harper & Row
- Publication date: 1975
- Publication place: United States
- Media type: Print (hardback)
- Pages: 334 (first edition, hardback)
- ISBN: 0-06-011176-3 (first edition, hardback)
- OCLC: 1102861
- Dewey Decimal: 813/.5/4
- LC Class: PZ4.E4695 De3 PS3555.L62

Deathbird Stories: A Pantheon of Modern Gods is a 1975 collection of short stories by American author Harlan Ellison, written over a period of ten years; the stories address the theme of modern-day "deities" that have replaced the older, more traditional ones. The collection, with its satirical, skeptical tone, is widely considered one of Ellison's best. The book includes a 1973 introduction and a stern caveat lector page advising the reader against enjoying the volume in one sitting. The title of the book comes from "The Deathbird", the nineteenth and last story in the collection. The collection includes three major award-winners, including "The Whimper of Whipped Dogs", which won the Edgar Award; "Adrift Just Off the Islets of Langerhans: Latitude 38° 54' N, Longitude 77° 00' 13" W", which won the Hugo Award; and "The Deathbird", another Hugo Award winner. Early editions have illustrations by Leo and Diane Dillon.

== Contents ==
It contains the following stories (along with an introduction):

- "Introduction: Oblations at Alien Altars"
- "The Whimper of Whipped Dogs"
  - Inspired by the Kitty Genovese murder.
- "Along the Scenic Route"
- "On the Downhill Side"
- "O Ye of Little Faith"
- "Neon"
- "Basilisk"
- "Pretty Maggie Moneyeyes"
- "Corpse"
- "Shattered Like A Glass Goblin"
- "Delusion for a Dragon Slayer"
- "The Face of Helene Bournouw"
- "Bleeding Stones"
- "At the Mouse Circus"
- "The Place with No Name"
- "Paingod"
- "Ernest and the Machine God"
- "Rock God"
- "Adrift Just Off the Islets of Langerhans: Latitude 38° 54' N, Longitude 77° 00' 13" W"
- "The Deathbird"

== Reception ==
The New York Times reviewer Gerald Jonas found that the stories "offer a mixture of overheated Hype and genuine concern for the human condition," noting that on occasion Ellison "raises excess and pretension to a form of art." In 1993, the Times described a reissue of the collection as "Fantasy at its most bizarre and unsettling." Writing in Galaxy, Spider Robinson reviewed the collection favorably, despite faulting Ellison's "unrelieved pessimism."

One academic biography describes Deathbird Stories as "a kind of spiritual autobiography" and notes that Ellison's modern gods "gain their influence not from revelatory or charismatic social movements but from the driving anxieties of mid-twentieth century American culture."
