= The Infinity Box =

1975 collection of science fiction and fantasy stories by Kate Wilhelm

- First edition cover
- Author: Kate Wilhelm
- Cover artist: Applebaum & Curtis (design)
- Language: English
- Genre: Science fiction, fantasy
- Publisher: Harper & Row
- Publication date: 1975
- Publication place: United States
- Media type: Print (hardback & paperback)
- Pages: 318
- OCLC: 1411741
- LC Class: 74-15894

The Infinity Box is a collection of science fiction and fantasy stories by American writer Kate Wilhelm, published in hardcover by Harper & Row in 1975. It was reprinted in paperback by Pocket Books in 1976; a British edition was published by Arrow Books in 1979, and a French translation, Le Village, appeared in 1987. It placed ninth in the annual Locus Poll for best story collection. Four of the nine stories were nominated for the Nebula Award.

== Contents ==
- "Introduction"
- "The Infinity Box" [N] (Orbit 9 1971)
- "The Time Piece" (original)
- "The Red Canary" (Orbit 12 1973)
- "Man of Letters" (original)
- "April Fool’s Day Forever" [N] (Orbit 7 1970)
- "Where Have You Been, Billy Boy, Billy Boy?" (Quark/3 1971)
- "The Fusion Bomb"· (Orbit 10 1972)
- "The Village" [N] (Bad Moon Rising 1973)
- "The Funeral" [N] (Again, Dangerous Visions 1972)

[N] designates Nebula-nominated stories.

== Reception ==
Spider Robinson declared that Wilhelm "is one of the best practitioners of the short story in or out of sf" and rated all but one of the stories as "thoroughly satisfying, some of them superb." The New York Times described the book as a "collection of innovative short stories."
