= Jane Rice =

American novelist

Jane Dixon Rice
- Born: Jane Theresa Dixon; April 30, 1913; Owensboro, Kentucky
- Died: March 2, 2003 (aged 89); Greensboro, North Carolina, US
- Occupation: Writer
- Spouse: John Thomas Rice
- Children: 1

Jane Rice (April 30, 1913 – March 2, 2003) was an American science fiction and horror writer.

Her fiction debut was with "The Dream" in the July 1940 issue of Unknown, edited by the legendary sf editor John W. Campbell. During the war she published 10 stories in Unknown. Campbell purchased her first and only novel, Lucy, in 1943, and was holding it in inventory for a future issue when Unknown suddenly ceased publication late in 1943. Street & Smith held the manuscript for several years but after the war it vanished from their files. Rice had failed to preserve a carbon copy. Despite efforts to trace it on the part of scholars and editors it has not been located.

Her stories in Unknown were well received. Her slyly sensual werewolf story "The Refugee" from the October 1943 issue was selected by Campbell for his best of anthology From Unknown Worlds (1946) and it was also anthologized in Rivals of Weird Tales (1990) and the Library of America's American Fantastic Tales: Terror and the Uncanny from the 1940s to Now (2009), edited by Peter Straub. "The Idol of the Flies" from the June 1942 issue has also been frequently anthologized; it concerns an evil boy named Pruitt who has been called "one of the most monstrous children in literature".

After the war she wrote for the slicks and women's magazines, including Colliers, Ladies' Home Journal, Cosmopolitan, and Charm. After a hiatus lasting several years she wrote stories for The Magazine of Fantasy and Science Fiction in the late 1950s, and in 1966 published the story "The Loolies Are Here", written in collaboration with Ruth Allison under the name Allison Rice in the anthology Orbit 1 (1966), edited by Damon Knight.

In the 1980s she resumed writing with a number of atmospheric mystery short stories for Alfred Hitchcock's Mystery Magazine.

In 1995 Necronomicon Press published her horror novelette The Sixth Dog as a chapbook. She did not live to see the publication of her second book, a collection of her short fiction called The Idol of the Flies and Other Stories, published by Midnight House in 2003 as a limited edition of 500 copies.

== Personal life ==
Jane Rice was born Jane Theresa Dixon on April 30, 1913, in Owensboro, Kentucky, the daughter of Dr. James Thomas Dixon and Julia C. Lynch. Her father, a physician, died when she was 14, and the following year she was sent to Notre Dame, Indiana to be educated at Saint Mary's College. At St. Mary's she was president of the senior class and editor of the school paper, The Marionette. After graduating in 1930 she attended Webster College in Webster Groves, Missouri, a Catholic women's institution operated by the Sisters of Loretto. In June 1936 she was married in Owensboro to John Thomas Rice of Philadelphia, a businessman in the textile and leather industries. A gushing newspaper account described the bride as "an unusually charming and attractive young woman." They moved to Toledo, Ohio where in 1937 they had a son, and Jane took up writing while living there. After living in Chicago, Cleveland, and Darien, Connecticut, in 1960 the Rices settled in Greensboro, North Carolina, where John was a manager at a textile firm. They lived there for the remainder of their lives. A devout Roman Catholic, she strongly opposed abortion. Her husband preceded her in death. They were survived by their son.

Rice died at her home in Greensboro, North Carolina, in 2003, at age 89.
