= Prospect Heights High School =

Public school in New York City

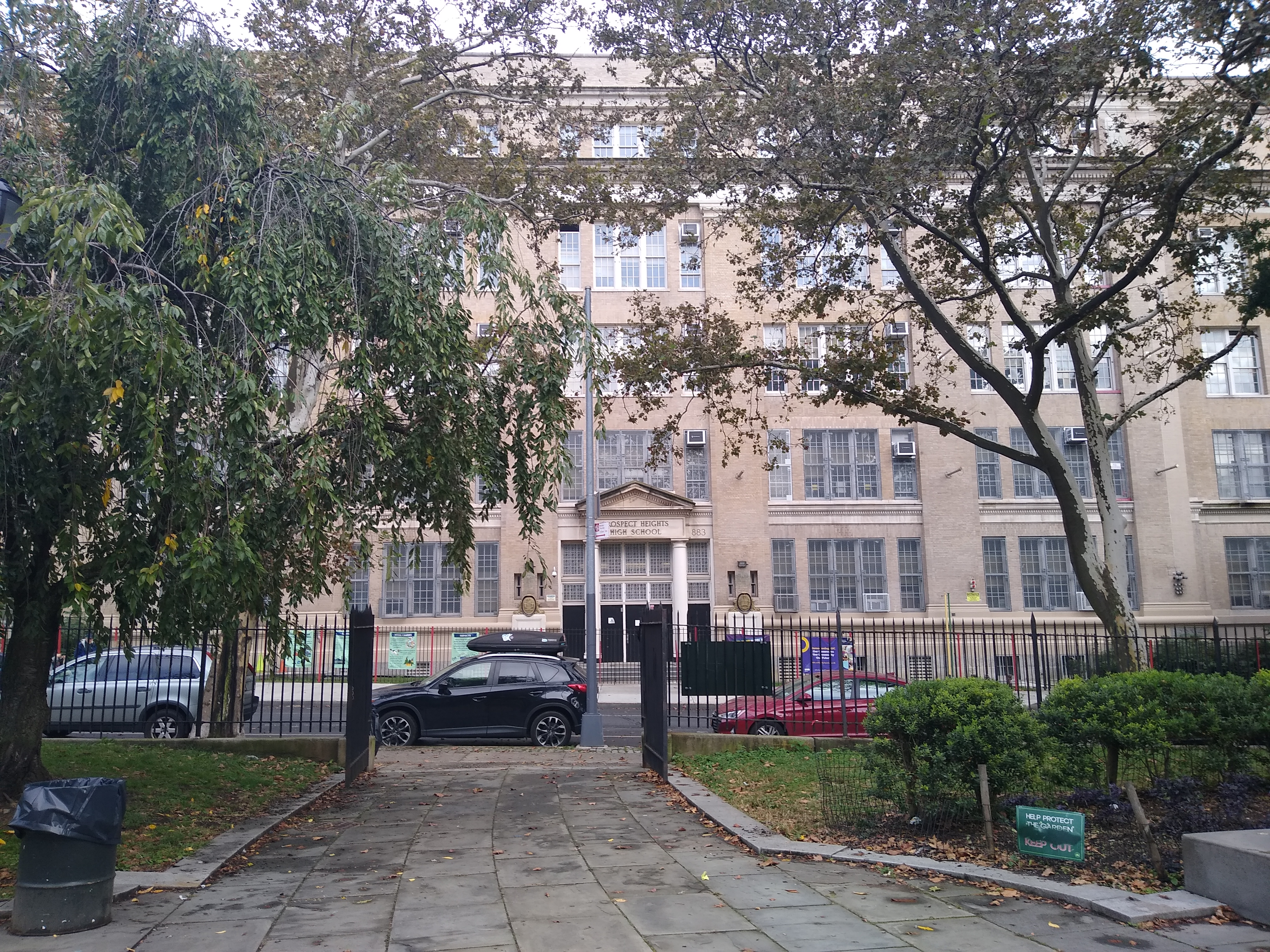

Location
- 883 Classon Avenue; Brooklyn, New York; United States; 40°40′12″N 73°57′41″W

Information
- Former name: The Girls' Commercial High School (1920s-c.1947)
- Type: Public
- Established: 1920s
- Closed: 2006
- Gender: Girls (initially); Mixed (later)
- Website: prospectheightscampus.com

Prospect Heights High School, formerly The Girls' Commercial High School, is a defunct comprehensive high school that served the Prospect Heights neighborhood of Brooklyn, New York City from the 1920s to 2006. Prospect Heights Campus is the collection of educational buildings that housed Prospect Heights High School until its closure in 2006. Despite its name, the school was south of Eastern Parkway, the commonly accepted southern border of the Prospect Heights.

== History ==
The Girls' Commercial High School, later to become Prospect Heights High School, was built in the 1920s. The school's exterior was designed to harmonize with the environment, while the interior was made to accommodate 3,500 students in fifty regular classrooms and other specialized laboratories and working rooms. Around 1947, it was renamed Prospect Heights High School as the curriculum encompassed college preparatory academic courses as well as those in fine arts and fashion along with the traditional commercial course. Later the all-girls high school became coeducational. After many years of decline and falling academic levels, the school graduated its last class in June 2006 and was closed. The Prospect Heights building now houses four small high schools: the Brooklyn School for Music and Theater, Brooklyn Academy for Science and the Environment, International High School at Prospect Heights, and the High School for Global Citizenship.

The main reasons for Prospect Heights High school's closure were overcrowding and consistently low performance grades received from the New York City Department of Education. The building was broken down into four smaller high schools, each with a specific focus and a cap on students.

Violence was also an issue within Prospect Heights High School. Its neighborhood saw a rise in gang activities in the 1980s, which seeped into the school and caused problems. Prospect Heights High School was ranked the twelfth most violent high school among New York City's 125 high schools in 1990 by the Board of Education, and became an example used by advocates for more metal detectors in New York City schools. Recently police involvement in the neighborhood has reduced the violence.

== Notable graduates ==
- Susan Hayward, actress
- Rhea Perlman, actress
- Anne Klein, American fashion designer
- Kitty Genovese, murder victim

== Current schools on campus ==
=== Brooklyn Academy of Science and the Environment ===
Brooklyn Academy of Science and the Environment (BASE) is a three-campus school, created in 2003 in partnership with the Prospect Park Alliance and the Brooklyn Botanic Garden.

=== International High School at Prospect Heights ===
International High School at Prospect Heights opened in 2004 to address the needs of recent immigrant students by teaching them fluency in reading, writing and speaking.

== School demographics ==
Sources:

1. Number of students per school:
  - International High School at Prospect Heights: 410
  - High School For Global Citizenship: 207
  - Brooklyn School for Music and Theater: 322
  - Brooklyn Academy of Science and the Environment: 394
2. Here is the racial breakdown of each school in Prospect Heights:
  - The International High School at Prospect Heights is composed of 12.2% White, 23% Black, 45.6% Hispanic, 15% Asian, and 1.5% American Indian students.
  - The High School for Global Citizenship is composed of 3% White, 72.5% Black, 18.3% Hispanic, 3.3% Asian, and 1.5% American Indian students.
  - Brooklyn School of Music and Theater is composed of 1.2% White, 81% Black, 15.8% Hispanic, 0.9% Asian, and 0.3% American Indian students.
  - Brooklyn Academy of Science and the Environment is composed of 3% White, 80% Black, 9.6% Hispanic, 5% Asian, and 0.8% American Indian students.
3. Student to teacher ratio per school:
  - INT: 16.5:1
  - HSGC: 14.3:1
  - BSMT: 14.9:1
  - BASE: 15.7:1
4. % of students at each school that receive free or reduced lunch:
  - INT: 320 (97%)
  - HSGC: 285 (88%)
  - BSMT: 297 (73%)
  - BASE: 371 (82%)

== Safety and security issues ==
Every morning students have to enter the building from the backdoor of the cafeteria, where they pass through scanning, remove their belts, and swipe their ID cards to indicate each school's attendance. Electronic devices are allowed in the building. Students must come early to get scanning, because there are four schools in Prospect Heights Campus.

The Safe Schools Against Violence in Education Act (SAVE) was passed by the New York State Legislature and signed by Governor George Pataki on July 24, 2000, in response to issues of school safety and violence prevention.

Prospect Heights High School was ranked twelfth most violent among New York City's 125 high schools in 1990 by the Board of Education, rating not only all the security hardware, but also a special full-time security coordinator, a retired police detective.

In 2019, it was reported that the campus had the highest number of “major crimes” of any public NYC high school in the 2017-18 school year, although it was not the most violent.
