= The Witness (2015 American film) =

American documentary film

- Theatrical release poster
- Directed by: James D. Solomon
- Written by: William Genovese; Russell Greene; Gabriel Rhodes; James D. Solomon
- Produced by: James D. Solomon
- Narrated by: William Genovese
- Cinematography: Trish Govoni
- Edited by: Gabriel Rhodes; Russell Greene
- Music by: Nathan Halpern
- Distributed by: FilmRise
- Release dates: October 6, 2015 (New York Film Festival); June 3, 2016 (limited, United States)
- Running time: 89 minutes
- Country: United States
- Language: English

The Witness is a 2015 American documentary film directed and produced by James D. Solomon. It follows William "Bill" Genovese as, decades after her death, he investigates the March 13, 1964, murder of his sister, Catherine Susan "Kitty" Genovese by Winston Moseley in Kew Gardens, a neighborhood in the New York City borough of Queens. Bill Genovese executive produced and narrated the film.

Upon its release, the film received positive reviews from critics. It was one of the fifteen documentaries (out of 145 entries) shortlisted for Best Documentary Feature at the 89th Academy Awards, though it was not one of the five final nominees for the award.

== Synopsis ==
The name Kitty Genovese became synonymous with bystander apathy, inspiring numerous sociology books and articles, after The New York Times reported that 38 witnesses saw her being murdered—and did nothing to help. The Witness follows her younger brother Bill's search for the truth, and ultimately debunks initial reports and long-held public opinion about the circumstances of her murder.

In addition to investigating Kitty's murder, the film reveals details about Kitty’s life: her popularity in high school; her brief marriage; her job as a bar manager; her relationship with her partner, Maryann Zielonko. It also examines the effect of the murder on Kitty’s family. During the Vietnam War, averse to being an "apathetic bystander", Bill determined he "wasn’t going to be like the 38 witnesses, so [he] enlisted in the Marines", losing both his legs to battle wounds. Her parents and siblings, to avoid bringing up painful memories, never discussed her, causing the details of her life to be a mystery, even to her eventual nieces and nephews.

== Plot ==
The Case

Kitty Genovese was murdered at about 3:20 am on March 13, 1964, in the Kew Gardens neighborhood of Queens, New York. The lede of the initial article in The New York Times about her death, written by Martin Gansberg, read:

"For more than half an hour 38 respectable, law-abiding citizens in Queens watched a killer stalk and stab a woman in three separate attacks in Kew Gardens."

The film argues that although "absolutely riveting", most of that statement was inaccurate:

- The number of "witnesses" is disputable, as, with one or two exceptions, the witnesses awakened by the attack only heard screams and were not eyewitnesses. The people in the apartment building could not have seen Kitty for more than a couple of minutes, could not clearly see the attack in the dark, and saw her stand up and stagger away, thinking they had seen a drunken brawl originating at a nearby bar. For most, that was the end of the attack. They had no sense Kitty was being "stalked".
- There were two attacks, not three. When a few witnesses saw the attacker, Winston Moseley, return, they assumed Kitty had gone someplace safe. They were unaware that Kitty had only staggered around the corner into an alley, then into a vestibule, behind a closed door, out of sight, and were unaware that the attacker later found Kitty in the vestibule, where he raped and killed her.

Journalist Jim Rasenberger tells Bill Genovese in the film: "If the story had been reported more accurately, it still would have been a two or three day—maybe a four-day story; but it would not have been a 50-year story. We would still not be talking about it today."

Bill Genovese's Investigation

William "Bill" Genovese was 16 when his older sister Kitty was murdered. For many years, Kitty’s family found it too painful to look into the facts of her death. Starting in March 2004, however, Bill began his own investigation into whether it was true that 38 witnesses failed to help his sister. With leads from prosecutor Charles Skoller, he obtained the police interviews and the transcript of Winston Moseley's trial, and set about finding the witnesses or informants who were still alive. His findings, which are documented in the film, include the following:

- Joseph Fink, a night elevator operator seated in the lobby of the Mowbray building across the street, saw the attack and did nothing. He was the only one who was fully aware of the incident as it unfolded who failed to act.
- Karl Ross looked down a staircase and saw the second attack taking place. He called friends for advice on what to do before calling police to report the attack. The police call log only listed one call related to the murder—from Karl Ross after Kitty was mortally wounded.
- Hattie Grund saw a woman screaming, "Help", standing in front of the cleaners. She says she called the police, who said they had already gotten calls about the incident. Newspaper accounts did not report that Grund and others called the police.

Only 5 of the "38 witnesses" were called to the testify at Moseley's trial, among them:

- Irene Frost heard screaming and saw a man and a woman across the street and heard Kitty scream, "Please help me, God. Please help me. I’ve been stabbed." At the window, she saw Kitty kneeling down on the sidewalk and Moseley running away down the street.
- Robert Mozer saw Kitty kneeling at the bookstore, and a man bending over her. Mozer hollered, "Hey, get out of there!", and Moseley jumped up and ran away.
- Andree Picq heard Mozer's yell to Moseley and saw Moseley run away fast. She then saw Kitty get up slowly and scream, "Help", walking slowly toward the backstreet. Picq was still at the window a few minutes after Moseley came back, walking normally as if nothing happened. "Then he went down to the train station and then he came out again and left in the back and I could not see anything, but I heard the last two screams, 'Help, help.'"
- Sophie Farrar lived in the apartment next to Kitty's and was a friend. She was awakened by a loud scream. About 20 minutes later she received a phone call—possibly from Karl Ross—informing her that Kitty was in the hall bleeding. Farrar rushed to find Kitty in the hallway and held her as she was dying waiting for an ambulance. The newspaper account failed to report this.

According to defense attorney Sydney Sparrow (as reported by his son), Moseley was bright and manipulative. Moseley told the story of killing Kitty in a cold "conversational tone", and also confessed to murdering Annie Mae Johnson two weeks before Kitty. He shot Annie Mae four times as she was getting out of her car at night, then raped her in her house while her unknowing family members were upstairs, then set the house on fire.

Moseley was sentenced to death for the murder of Genovese, but his sentence was reduced to life imprisonment on appeal. In 1968, he escaped from prison and terrorized Buffalo, New York, for 4 days, breaking into houses, raping a woman at gunpoint, and taking hostages before being captured by the FBI. He went on to complete a sociology degree from prison in 1977, and later claimed to be reformed.

Bill attempts to interview Winston Moseley, who refuses, saying he was "tired of being exploited." Moseley's son Steven, a minister, does agree to meet with Bill, however. He says his father told him that Kitty had hurled racial slurs at Moseley, who "snapped" and killed her, but a dubious Bill points out that Moseley had previously killed Annie Mae Johnson, who was African American. Steven then states that he was scared to meet with Bill because the story in his family is that Kitty was related to the Genovese crime family, which Bill denies. Later, Bill receives a letter from Winston Moseley, which makes the "bizarre claim" that Moseley had just been an unwitting getaway driver the night Kitty was killed, and "an Italian mobster named Dominick" killed Kitty over an unpaid debt, threatening Moseley and his family if he revealed the truth.

Bill concludes: "I've come to realize that the whole truth about Kitty's death will never be known, but maybe that's why the story continues to fascinate people…but I know she'd want me to move on."

== Cast ==
- Kitty Genovese, a murder victim (archive footage)
- Winston Moseley, a confessed and convicted murderer (archive footage)
- William Genovese, one of Kitty's younger brothers
- Sophia Farrar, Kitty's neighbor and friend
- A. M. Rosenthal, an editor at The New York Times
- Mike Wallace, a journalist who reported on the case
- Gabe Pressman, a journalist critical of the initial coverage of the case
- Shannon Beeby, an actress recruited for the reenactment done in the film

== Reception ==
On review aggregator website Rotten Tomatoes, 90% of 61 critics' reviews of the film are positive, with an average rating of 7.7/10; the site's "critics consensus" reads: "The Witness can't hope to truly untangle the true crime case at its center, but offers a series of fascinating — and troubling — insights in the attempt." On Metacritic, the film holds a weighted average score of 79 out of 100 based on reviews by 18 critics, indicating "generally favorable reviews".

In a positive review, Pat Padua of The Washington Post wrote: "The Witness makes an encouraging case for the argument that society is not as apathetic as we fear. But it also reveals a troubling phenomenon: our willingness to accept all that we are told as truth." Writing for Variety, Nick Schager said: "The Witness functions as a project of not only confrontation but resurrection, as Bill's sleuthing sheds new light on Kitty’s personality, romances and career, and thus finally re-emphasizes her as a flesh-and-blood person rather than just a famous victim." Reviewing for The A.V. Club, A.A. Dowd wrote: "Perhaps because any real closure is impossible at this point, The Witness eventually embraces its own inconclusiveness, like some documentary cousin to Zodiac."

Justin Chang of the Los Angeles Times lauded the film and said: "The strength of The Witness lies in its recognition that the truth is often not just elusive but unattainable." Reviewing for RogerEbert.com, film critic Matt Zoller Seitz wrote: "This is a powerful movie, but perhaps its greatest triumph is that for a brief time it resurrects Kitty Genovese, and lets us see her as a person" Farran Smith Nehme of the New York Post explained: "Solomon and Genovese remind us that all witnesses can be unreliable, in one way or another. The emotional impact comes from the gentle way the film reveals Kitty Genovese as a loving, vibrant person, and not as a symbol." Joe McGovern of Entertainment Weekly said that "The powerful thrust of the film comes from its critique of the media."

Joe Morgenstern of The Wall Street Journal reviewed the film positively, saying: "The Witness is remarkable for its emotional impact, and its clarity. The picture that emerges isn’t perfectly clear; the whole truth will never be known, Bill Genovese says. What he has made known, though, is valuable." Kate Erbland of Indiewire said: ""Although The Witness functions just fine as a true crime documentary in the vein of such en vogue offerings as Serial and Making a Murderer, the film makes its mark when it leans in on the deeply personal connection between its subject and its storyteller." Andy Webster of The New York Times praised the film and said: "A re-creation of the night, with an actress playing the screaming victim while Mr. Genovese observes, is harrowing." Frank Scheck of The Hollywood Reporter expressed: "Few films feel as cathartic as James Solomon's documentary The Witness."

The Witness was named as one of the best films of 2016 by both Richard Brody of The New Yorker and David Edelstein New York.

=== Accolades ===
Award	Category	Recipients and nominees	Results	Ref.
Atlanta Film Festival	Best Documentary Feature	James D. Solomon	Nominated	
Boulder International Film Festival	Best Feature Documentary (Theatrical Feature)	James D. Solomon	Won	
Critics' Choice Documentary Awards	Best First Documentary	James D. Solomon	Nominated	
Critics' Choice Documentary Awards	Best Documentary Feature	The Witness	Nominated	
Hong Kong International Film Festival	Golden Firebird Award (Documentary)	James D. Solomon	Nominated	
Sarasota Film Festival	Best Documentary Feature – Jury	James D. Solomon	Nominated	
