= The Whimper of Whipped Dogs =

- Short story by Harlan Ellison
- Country: United States
- Language: English
- Genre: Horror fiction short story

Publication
- Published in: Bad Moon Rising: An Anthology of Political Forebodings
- Publication type: Anthology
- Publisher: Harper & Row
- Media type: Hardback
- Publication date: 1973

"The Whimper of Whipped Dogs" is a horror short story by Harlan Ellison. It was first published in the 1973 anthology Bad Moon Rising: An Anthology of Political Forebodings edited by Thomas M. Disch. It was also published in several other anthologies such as Deathbird Stories. It was inspired by the murder of Kitty Genovese.

== Origin of the story's title ==
The first use of the title "The Whimper of Whipped Dogs" was a teleplay for a 1970 episode of the TV series The Young Lawyers, which was serialized in Ellison's Los Angeles Free Press television critique column at the time, "The Glass Teat". At the end of the serialization, Ellison wrote two more columns expressing his extreme frustration with what the ABC network, Paramount Pictures, producer, director and cast members (especially co-star Lee J. Cobb) had done to his teleplay during production. The columns, including the complete teleplay, were published in 1975 in the collection The Other Glass Teat.

As Ellison was particularly proud of creating the title "The Whimper of Whipped Dogs," but the title was not used onscreen in the Young Lawyers episode, the author decided to use the title again for this short story over three years later.

== Reception ==
In reviewing Bad Moon Rising: An Anthology of Political Forebodings, The Magazine of Fantasy and Science Fiction editor Joanna Russ said "The Whimper of Whipped Dogs" is "a passionate, fully-detailed, well-written New York paranoia story by Harlan Ellison which puts forward (to my mind) untenable view that violence is caused by Satan or maybe Original Sin" and David Hartwell of Locus calls it "one of his best, a dark fantasy about New York and New Yorkers."

== Awards ==
"The Whimper of Whipped Dogs" won the 1974 Edgar Allan Poe Award for Best Short Story.
