= Where Late the Sweet Birds Sang =

1976 novel by Kate Wilhelm

- Cover of first edition (hardcover)
- Author: Kate Wilhelm
- Cover artist: M. C. Escher
- Language: English
- Genre: Science fiction, dystopian
- Publisher: Harper & Row
- Publication date: 1976
- Publication place: United States
- Media type: Print (hardback & paperback)
- Pages: 207
- Awards: Locus Award for Best Novel (1977)
- ISBN: 0-06-014654-0
- OCLC: 1529187
- Dewey Decimal: 813/.5/4
- LC Class: PZ4.W678 Wh PS3573.I434

Where Late the Sweet Birds Sang is a science fiction novel by American writer Kate Wilhelm, published in 1976. The novel is composed of three parts, "Where Late the Sweet Birds Sang," "Shenandoah," and "At the Still Point," and is set in a post-apocalyptic era, a concept popular among authors who took part in the New Wave Science Fiction movement in the 1960s.

Before the publication of Wilhelm's novel in 1976, part one of Where Late the Sweet Birds Sang was featured in the fifteenth edition of Orbit. Kate Wilhelm was a regular contributor to the Orbit anthology series, and assisted Damon Knight and other contributors with the anthology's editing. In its time, Orbit was known for publishing works of SF that differed from the mainstream of science fiction being published at the time.

The title of the book is a quotation from William Shakespeare's Sonnet 73.

== Plot summary ==
The novel takes place in Virginia, somewhere near the Shenandoah River, and quickly establishes its plot line in a post-apocalyptic era. The collapse of civilization around the world has resulted from massive environmental changes and global disease, which were attributed to large-scale pollution. With a range of members privileged by virtue of education and monetary resources, one large family founds an isolated community in an attempt to survive the still-developing global disasters. As the death toll rises, mainly to disease and nuclear warfare, they discover that the human population left on earth is universally infertile. From cloning experiments conducted through the study of mice, the scientists in the small community theorize that the infertility might be reversed after multiple generations of cloning, and the family begins cloning themselves in an effort to survive. The assumption is that after a few generations of cloning, the people will be able to revert to traditional biological reproduction.

However, to the horror of the few surviving members of the original group, the clones who are finally coming of age reject the idea of sexual reproduction in favor of further cloning. The original members of the community, too old and outnumbered by the clones to resist, are forced to accept the new social order and the complications that arise.

The new generations are cloned in groups of four to ten individuals, and due to a strong emotional and mental connection between the clones, they have a strong sense of empathy for one another. As the old generation dies out and the clones seek to expand their territory, they quickly discover that prolonged separation from other members of their group produces irreversible psychological stress. One woman, Molly, after being separated from her clones while on an expedition to find materials in the ruins of nearby cities, regains a "human" sense of individuality, which her fellow clones believe to be dangerous to the community. As a result of this, she is exiled.

Though Molly is allowed to live by herself in peace, she is not allowed contact with the other clones except the members who bring her the supplies she needs. In secret, she goes on to have a child with Ben, one of the clones who accompanied her on the journey to the surrounding cities. After a few years of successful secrecy, she and the child are found, and although Molly and Ben are expelled from the community, the child, Mark, is allowed to stay. The clones, though wary of his threatening individuality, hope to study him in order to learn more about non-clones. As the child becomes a man, he realizes that his uniqueness gives him individuality and the ability to live away from the community, something which the clones are now unable to do. The leaders of the community realize that the latest generations of clones are losing all sense of creativity and are unable to come up with new solutions to problems; simultaneously they see that the growing lack of high-technology equipment will result in the community losing the ability to continue with the cloning process.

As the only "naturally" produced human in the community, Mark seeks his own solution to the problem, and by force he leads a group of fertile women and children to abandon the community and start over, leaving a trail of devastation to the clone community in the wake of his departure. He returns to the community twenty years later to discover that in the wake of this disaster, the clones, unable to survive with their limited adaptability, have perished and the village has been destroyed. At novel's end, Mark returns to the community he created, where all of the children and younger generations, products of conventional reproduction, continue to thrive.

The novel makes a passing reference to the end of global warming due to a decline in human pollution:

The winters were getting colder, starting earlier, lasting longer, with more snows than he could remember from childhood. As soon as man stopped adding his megatons of filth to the atmosphere each day, he thought, the atmosphere had reverted to what it must have been long ago, moister weather summer and winter, more stars than he had ever seen before, and more, it seemed, each night than the night before: the sky a clear, endless blue by day, velvet blue-black at night with blazing stars that modern man had never seen.

== Main characters ==
=== David ===
A very serious and dedicated scientist, David is a family member of the surviving colony of humans and a significant contributor to the creation of the first generation of clones, with which he has a tenuous relationship at best. He is in love with his cousin, Celia, and he is a donor with a batch of clones derived from his genes.

=== Celia ===
Also a family member in the original community, she is a small, but determined individual. She is a passionate person who seeks to help those suffering from the increasing global catastrophes, and assists with the development of sustainable farming methods in struggling countries. She is in love with David and is a gene donor for the production of clones.

=== Molly ===
A member of a group of clones who are all inventive and artistic <Wilhelm, K. 1977 Where late the Sweet birds sang. Pg. 63 Pocket ed.>. Her clone group are 'The Miriam sisters' a group of six; Miriam the eldest, Molly, Miri, Melinda, Meg and Martha <Wilhelm, K. 1977 Where late the Sweet birds sang. Pg. 64 Pocket ed.>. Molly is a crew member of the first expedition to the outer cities, included for her ability to sketch and location memory, she suffers greatly from prolonged separation from her sisters. She is exiled to a house towards the far edges of the community and has a brief relationship with Ben. With Ben's assistance, she gives birth to Mark.

=== Ben ===
A scientist and a leader, he is also one of the original clones, along with his four brothers. He is a crew member of the first expedition, and suffers some psychological trauma from his separation from his brothers. He has a brief relationship with Molly, and is the biological father of Mark.

=== Barry ===
Also a scientist and one of Ben's brothers, he is a cautious man who resents the developed individuality of Molly, Ben, and the others who came back from the first expedition changed. Believing that the changed clones are a danger to the community, he takes a leadership position in the village after Molly and Ben are exiled.

=== Mark ===
The child of Ben and Molly, Mark is the first sexually reproduced individual in the colony who is allowed to live in the village with the clones. Separated from his mother, he is rambunctious, and a trouble maker for Barry and the other members of the community. He is isolated in the community due his individuality and intentionally causes trouble for both the clones in his peer group and the rest of the population. Eventually, he develops an escape plan and finds a community outside the village.

== Awards ==
Where Late the Sweet Birds Sang is the winner of several science fiction awards, including:

- The Hugo Award for Best Novel in 1977.
- The Locus Award and Poll for best novel in 1977.
- The Jupiter Award in 1977.
- The John W. Campbell Memorial Award in 1977, winning third place.

Where Late the Sweet Birds Sang was also nominated for the Nebula Award in 1977.
