= Orbit (anthology series) =

Series of science fiction anthologies

Orbit was a series of anthologies of new science fiction edited by Damon Knight, often featuring work by such writers as Gene Wolfe, Joanna Russ, R. A. Lafferty, and Kate Wilhelm. The anthologies tended toward the avant-garde edge of science fiction, but by no means exclusively; occasionally the volumes featured nonfiction critical writing or humorous anecdotes by Knight. Inspired by Frederik Pohl's Star Science Fiction series, and in its turn an influence on other original speculative fiction anthologies, it ran for over a decade and twenty-one volumes, not including a 1975 "Best of" collection selected from the first ten volumes.

== Rationale and publication history ==
In his Introduction to the final Orbit volume (no. 21), Knight wrote:

A series of original anthologies, like Fred Pohl's Star Science Fiction, if it had hardcover, paperback, and book-club editions, could easily pay its way. I made up a proposal, called it Orbit more or less at random, and my agent sent it around ...

Thomas A. Dardis, then editor-in-chief of Berkley, bought it, and we worked out the details. For a while Doubleday was interested in doing a hardcover edition, but that fell through; then Berkley was acquired by Putnam, and there was our hardcover edition ...

What I wanted to do in Orbit was to bring about a revolution in science fiction, like Campbell's in the eary [sic?] forties, Gold's and Boucher/McComas's in the fifties. My thesis was that there was no inherent reason why science fiction could not meet ordinary literary standards, but that the pulp tradition of forty years has enouraged [sic?] ideas at the expense of writing skill. It seemed to me that the only way to cure this was to set high standards at the beginning, even if it meant publishing a lot of fantasy and marginal material because most hard-core s.f. could not make the grade. Later, cocky with success, I followed this trail too far.

Knight listed Gardner Dozois and Gene Wolfe as two authors who he "took a chance on" and who then became frequent contributors to Orbit. Dozois himself did not seem to be thrilled about the trajectory of Orbit or about the consequences of a continued association with Knight's series of anthologies. In an introduction to Wolfe's story The Death of Doctor Island, Dozois wrote:

Wolfe remained seriously underappreciated throughout most of the decade [the 1970s] ...book editors were telling me that Wolfe had no real audience and no future as a mass-market author ...

Perhaps all this was because Wolfe was strongly identified with Orbit in the early seventies, and, as Orbit was the major American recipient for the spleen of the reactionary backlash that developed early in the decade, his reputation probably suffered from the association, as would the reputations of Joanna Russ, Kate Wilhelm, R. A. Lafferty, and several other frequent Orbit contributors.

== Orbit 1 ==
Orbit 1 was published in October 1966 by Berkley Medallion. Algis Budrys praised Knight's skills as editor and critic but said that the compilation "represents science fiction well but not to any extraordinary extent", with no story "clearly and obviously the 'best' of anything". He advised readers to buy the paperback version.

Table of contents:

- "Introduction" by Damon Knight
- "Staras Flonderans" by Kate Wilhelm
- ”The Secret Place” by Richard M. McKenna
- "How Beautiful with Banners" by James Blish
- "The Disinherited" by Poul Anderson, reprinted as "Home"
- "The Loolies Are Here" by Allison Rice
- "Kangaroo Court" by Virginia Kidd, reprinted as "Flowering Season"
- "Splice of Life" by Sonya Dorman
- "5 Eggs" by Thomas M. Disch
- "The Deeps" by Keith Roberts

== Orbit 2 ==
Volume 2 was published in 1967. Budrys said "It is more a sign that Damon's heart is in the right place than it is a really satisfactory book."

Table of contents:

- "The Doctor" by Theodore L. Thomas
- "Baby, You Were Great" by Kate Wilhelm
- "Fiddler's Green" by Richard McKenna
- "Trip, Trap" by Gene Wolfe
- "The Dimple In Draco" by Robert S. Richardson
- "I Gave her Sack and Sherry" by Joanna Russ
- "The Adventuress" by Joanna Russ
- "The Hole on the Corner" by R. A. Lafferty
- "The Food Farm" by Kit Reed
- "Full Sun" by Brian W. Aldiss, republished in World's Best Science Fiction: 1968. and Creatures from Beyond: Nine Stories of Science Fiction and Fantasy

== Orbit 3 ==
Volume 3 was published in 1968. Algis Budrys found the volume "happens to contain some remarkable work," although he faulted the jacket copy as overpromotional.

Table of contents:

- "Mother to the World" by Richard Wilson
- "Bramble Bush" by Richard McKenna (interior artwork by Jack Gaughan)
- "The Barbarian" by Joanna Russ
- "The Changeling" by Gene Wolfe
- "Why They Mobbed the White House" by Doris Pitkin Buck
- "The Planners" by Kate Wilhelm
- "Don't Wash the Carats" by Philip José Farmer
- "Letter to a Young Poet" by James Sallis
- "Here Is Thy Sting" by John Jakes

== Orbit 4 ==
Volume 4 was published in 1968.

Table of contents:

- "Windsong" by Kate Wilhelm
- "Probable Cause" by Charles L. Harness
- "Shattered Like a Glass Goblin" by Harlan Ellison
- "This Corruptible" by Jacob Transue
- "Animal" by Carol Emshwiller
- "One at a Time" by R. A. Lafferty
- "Passengers" by Robert Silverberg
- "Grimm’s Story" by Vernor Vinge
- "A Few Last Words" by James Sallis

== Orbit 5 ==
Volume 5 was published September 1969 by G.P. Putnam's Sons. It was reprinted in October 1969 by Putnam, December 1969 by Berkley Medallion, and November 1970 in the UK by Rapp & Whiting. Barry N. Malzberg wrote that the anthology "doesn't, somehow, seem to be at the same high level of ambition or accomplishment as the earlier volumes," but singled out "The Big Flash" for praise, declaring "The last pages of this story may be one of the strongest experiences available in modern American fiction."

Table of contents:

- "Somerset Dreams" by Kate Wilhelm
- "The Roads, The Roads, The Beautiful Roads" by Avram Davidson, reprinted in the anthology Car Sinister The head of a state highway department, whose greatest passion is designing highways, even if they are not needed, takes a wrong exit and ends up in a closed off tunnel, where a minotaur attacks him.
- "Look, You Think You've Got Troubles" by Carol Carr, about a non-religious Jewish family whose daughter marries an alien who subsequently converts to Judaism.
- "Winter's King" by Ursula K. Le Guin
- "The Time Machine" by Langdon Jones, with a prisoner reminiscing about an affair he had with a married woman.
- "Configuration of the North Shore" by R.A. Lafferty about a psychiatrist exploring a patient's extraordinary dream that could lead to the ultimate fulfillment of human existence.
- "Paul's Treehouse" by Gene Wolfe
- "The Price" by Belcher C. Davis, reprinted as "Just Dead Enough". A local newspaper reporter follows a case where a man dies in a car accident and his organs are transplanted into other people in the town. When one of the organ recipients kills someone in a car accident and doesn't have insurance, their lawyer argues that the organ recipient is the donor's heir. Then the heirs sue the hospital for getting them involved in the case to begin with.
- "The Rose Bowl-Pluto Hypothesis" by Robert S. Richardson. A professor notices that racing scores have dramatically improved and proposes that it is due to space shrinking.
- "Winston" by Kit Reed, written in 1969 and reprinted in 1976 in the anthology The Killer Mice and in 1981 in the collection Other Stories and...The Attack of the Giant Baby. A family purchases a child bred for intelligence, but neglects them and beats them until they suffer irreparable brain damage, when the mother finally views them as a normal child.
- "The History Makers" by James Sallis. The story is told in a series of letters from a person known as Jim to his brother John. He writes about his stay on an alien planet. The beings there live in an "alternate time span" whereby interaction with humans is nearly impossible. Over the course of the planet's "day" the inhabitants build a city from a rude village. As the day ends, the inhabitants change: most go comatose, but others go insane and destroy their city. Eventually the entire city, including its ruins, is destroyed.
- "The Big Flash" by Norman Spinrad, which won the Nebula Award for Best Novelette. The Pentagon hatches a plan to use atomic warfare in the Vietnam War. It had been determined that a single nuclear attack would destroy 2/3 of the enemy's fighting force. In order to get the American population to go along with the idea of nuclear warfare, the Pentagon hire a rock band called the Four Horsemen to popularize the use of nuclear warfare.

== Orbit 6 ==
Volume 6 was published in 1970.

Table of contents:

- "The Second Inquisition" by Joanna Russ
- "Remembrance to Come" by Gene Wolfe
- "How the Whip Came Back" by Gene Wolfe
- "Goslin Day" by Avram Davidson
- "Maybe Jean-Baptiste Pierre Antoine de Monet, Chevalier de Lamarck, Was a Little Bit Right" by Robin S. Scott
- "The Chosen" by Kate Wilhelm
- "Entire and Perfect Chrysolite" by R. A. Lafferty
- "Sunburst" by Roderick Thorp
- "The Creation of Bennie Good" by James Sallis
- "The End" by Ursula K. Le Guin
- "A Cold Dark Night with Snow" by Kate Wilhelm
- "Fame" by Jean Cox
- "Debut" by Carol Emshwiller
- "Where No Sun Shines" by Gardner Dozois
- "The Asian Shore" by Thomas M. Disch

== Orbit 7 ==
Volume 7 was first published in 1970.

Table of contents:

- "The Island of Doctor Death and Other Stories" by Gene Wolfe
- "In the Queue" by Keith Laumer
- "Continued on Next Rock" by R. A. Lafferty
- "Eyebem" by Gene Wolfe
- "Jim and Mary G", by James Sallis
- "Old Foot Forgot" by R. A. Lafferty
- "The Pressure of Time" by Thomas M. Disch
- "Woman Waiting" by Carol Emshwiller
- "The Living End" by Sonya Dorman
- "To Sport with Amaryllis" by Richard Hill
- "April Fool's Day Forever" by Kate Wilhelm
- "A Dream at Noonday" by Gardner Dozois

== Orbit 8 ==
Volume 8 was published in 1970 by G.P. Putnam's Sons.

Table of contents:

- "Horse of Air" by Gardner Dozois, reprinted in Nebula Award Stories 7, The Best from Orbit, and The Visible Man. A man survives the end of the world inside his apartment.
- "One Life, Furnished in Early Poverty" by Harlan Ellison
- "Rite of Spring" by Avram Davidson
- "The Bystander" by Thom Lee Wharton
- "All Pieces of a River Shore" by R. A. Lafferty
- "Sonya, Crane Wessleman, and Kittee" by Gene Wolfe
- "Tablets of Stone" by Liz Hufford
- "Starscape with Frieze of Dreams" by Robert F. Young
- "The Book" by Robert E. Margroff and Andrew J. Offutt
- "Inside" by Carol Carr
- "Right Off the Map" by Pip Winn
- "The Weather on the Sun" by Theodore L. Thomas
- "The Chinese Boxes" by Graham Charnock
- "A Method Bit in "B"" by Gene Wolfe. A police sergeant investigating a murder discovers he is actually a bit character in a B-movie.
- "Interurban Queen" by R.A. Lafferty, reprinted in RINGING CHANGES, Days of Grass, Days of Straw, and Lafferty in Orbit. A satirical story about an alternate history America where light rail systems have become the norm and cars are outlawed. This world is portrayed as a paradise, with all cities small, unique, and mostly for entertainment. Cars still exist, but being caught driving one is a capital offense without trial.
- "The Encounter" by Kate Wilhelm

== Orbit 9 ==
Volume 9 published by Putnam Books in 1971. Theodore Sturgeon found the anthology "fascinating," saying "I profoundly admire what Knight is doing here."

- "Heads Africa Tails America" by Josephine Saxton
- "What We Have Here Is Too Much Communication" by Leon E. Stover
- "Dominant Species" by Kris Neville
- "The Toy Theater" by Gene Wolfe
- "Stop Me Before I Tell More" by Robert Thurston
- "Gleepsite" by Joanna Russ
- "Binaries" by James Sallis
- "Lost in the Marigolds" by Lee Hoffman and Robert E. Toomey, Jr.
- "Across the Bar" by Kit Reed
- "The Science Fair" by Vernor Vinge
- "The Last Leaf" by W. Macfarlane
- "When All the Lands Pour Out Again" by R. A. Lafferty
- "Only the Words Are Different" by James Sallis
- "The Infinity Box" by Kate Wilhelm

== Orbit 10 ==
Volume 10 was published in 1972.

Table of contents:

- "The Fifth Head of Cerberus" by Gene Wolfe
- "Jody after the War" by Edward Bryant
- "Al" by Carol Emshwiller
- "Now I'm Watching Roger" by Alexei Panshin
- "Whirl Cage" by Jack M. Dann
- "A Kingdom by the Sea" by Gardner R. Dozois
- "Christlings" by Albert Teichner
- "Live, from Berchtesgaden" by George Alec Effinger
- "Dorg" by R.A. Lafferty
- "Gantlet" by Richard E. Peck
- "The Fusion Bomb" by Kate Wilhelm
- Index to Volumes 1-10

== Orbit 11 ==
Volume 11 was published in 1972.

Table of contents:

- "Alien Stones" by Gene Wolfe
- "Spectra" by Vonda N. McIntyre
- "I Remember a Winter" by Frederik Pohl
- "Doucement, S'il Vous Plait" by James Sallis
- "The Summer of the Irish Sea" by C. L. Grant
- "Good-bye, Shelley, Shirley, Charlotte, Charlene" by Robert Thurston
- "Father's in the Basement" by Philip José Farmer
- "Down by the Old Maelstrom" by Edward Wellen
- "Things Go Better" by Geo. Alec Effinger
- "Dissolve" by Gary K. Wolf
- "Dune's Edge" by Edward Bryant
- "The Drum Lollipop" by Jack M. Dann
- "Machines of Loving Grace" by Gardner R. Dozois
- "They Cope" by Dave Skal
- "Counterpoint" by Joe W. Haldeman
- "Old Soul" by Steve Herbst
- "New York Times" by Charles Platt
- "The Crystallization of the Myth" by John Barfoot
- "To Plant a Seed" by Hank Davis
- "On the Road to Honeyville" by Kate Wilhelm

== Orbit 12 ==
Volume 12 was published in 1973.

Table of Contents:

- "Shark" by Edward Bryant
- "Direction of the Road" by Ursula K. Le Guin
- "The Windows in Dante's Hell" by Michael Bishop
- "Four Stories" by Brian W. Aldiss
  - "Serpent Burning on an Altar"
  - "Woman in Sunlight with Mandolin"
  - "The Young Soldier's Horoscope"
  - "Castle Scene with Penitents"
- "The Red Canary" by Kate Wilhelm
- "What's the Matter With Herbie?" by Mel Gilden
- "Pinup" by Edward Bryant
- "The Genius Freaks" by Vonda N. McIntyre
- "Burger Creature" by Steve Chapman
- "Half the Kingdom" by Doris Piserchia
- "Continuing Westward" by Gene Wolfe
- "Arcs and Secants (Orbit 12)" essay, uncredited

== Orbit 13 ==
Volume 13 was published in 1974.

Table of Contents:

- "The Scream" by Kate Wilhelm
- "Young Love" by Grania Davis
- "And Name My Name" by R. A. Lafferty
- "Going West" by Edward Bryant
- "My Friend Zarathustra" by James Sallis
- "Therapy" by Gary K. Wolf
- "Gardening Notes From All Over" by W. Macfarlane
- "Idio" by Doris Piserchia
- "Fantasy's Profession" by Albert Teichner
- "Spring Came to Blue Ridge Early This Year" by Charles Arnold
- "Creation of a Future World in the Tracer" by Steve Herbst
- "Coils" by John Barfoot
- "Time Bind" by Sonya Dorman
- "Everybody a Winner, the Barker Cried" by C. L. Grant
- "Naked and Afraid I Go" by Doris Piserchia
- "Teeth" by Grace Rooney
- "Troika" by Stepan Chapman
- "Black Sun" by Dennis Etchison
- "The Mouth Is for Eating" by William F. Orr
- "Flash Point" by Gardner R. Dozois
- "Arcs & Secants (Orbit 13)" essay

== Orbit 14 ==
Volume 14 was published in 1974.

Table of Contents:

- "They Say (Orbit 14)" by Damon Knight
- "Tin Soldier" by Joan D. Vinge
- "Reasonable People" by Joanna Russ
- "Royal Licorice" by R. A. Lafferty
- "Book Reviews (Orbit 14)" by Damon Knight
- "The Stars Below" by Ursula K. Le Guin
- "A Brother to Dragons, a Companion of Owls" by Kate Wilhelm
- "The Bridge Builder" by Gary K. Wolf
- "Winning of the Great American Greening Revolution" by Murray F. Yaco
- "Forlesen" by Gene Wolfe
- "The Memory Machine (Orbit 14)" by Damon Knight
- "Arcs & Secants (Orbit 14)" by Damon Knight

== Orbit 15 ==
Volume 15 was published in 1974.

Table of Contents:

- "They Say (Orbit 15)" by Damon Knight
- "Flaming Ducks and Giant Bread" by R. A. Lafferty
- "Pale Hands" by Doris Piserchia
- "Why Booth Didn't Kill Lincoln" by Edward Wellen
- "If Eve Had Failed to Conceive" by Edward Wellen
- "Where Late the Sweet Birds Sang" by Kate Wilhelm
- "Melting" by Gene Wolfe
- "In the Lilliputian Asylum" by Michael Bishop
- "Ernie" by Lowell Kent Smith
- "The Memory Machine (Orbit 15)" by Damon Knight
- "Live? Our Computers Will Do That for Us" by Brian W. Aldiss
- "Ace 167" by Eleanor Arnason
- "Biting Down Hard on Truth" by George Alec Effinger
- "Arcs and Secants (Orbit 15)" by Damon Knight

== Orbit 16 ==
Volume 16 was published in 1975. Spider Robinson dismissed the anthology as minor and disappointing, noting that most of the stories were "manifestly by newcomers, first sales or nearly so."

Table of contents:

- "They Say (Orbit 16)" by Damon Knight
- "Mother and Child" by Joan D. Vinge
- "The Skinny People of Leptophlebo Street" by R. A. Lafferty
- "A Brilliant Curiosity" by Doris Piserchia
- "Phoenix House" by Jesse Miller
- "Jack and Betty" by Robert Thurston
- "Prison of Clay, Prison of Steel" by Henry-Luc Planchat
- "Heartland" by Gustav Hasford
- "Sandial" by Moshe Feder
- "The Memory Machine (Orbit 16)" by Damon Knight
- "In Donovan's Time" by C. L. Grant
- "Ambience" by Dave Skal
- "Binary Justice" by Richard Bireley
- "The House by the Sea" by Eleanor Arnason
- "Euclid Alone" by William F. Orr
- "Arcs and Secants (Orbit 16)" by Damon Knight

== Orbit 17 ==
Volume 17 was first published in 1975.

Table of contents:

- "They Say (Orbit 17)" by Damon Knight
- "The Anthropologist" by Kathleen M. Sidney
- "The Man with the Golden Reticulates" by Felix C. Gotschalk
- "The Steel Sonnets" by Jeff Duntemann
- "Toto, I Have a Feeling We're Not in Kansas Anymore" by Jeff Millar
- "Autopsy in Transit" by Stepan Chapman (as Steve Chapman)
- "House" by John Barfoot
- "Fun Palace" by Raylyn Moore
- "When We Were Good" by Dave Skal
- "The Memory Machine (Orbit 17)" by Damon Knight
- "Which in the Wood Decays" by Seth McEvoy
- "Great Day in the Morning" by R. A. Lafferty
- "The Maze" by Stuart Dybek
- "Quite Late One Spring Night" by John M. Curlovich
- "Under the Hollywood Sign" by Tom Reamy
- "Arcs and Secants (Orbit 17)" by Damon Knight

== Orbit 18 ==
Volume 18 was first published in 1976.

Table of Contents:

- "They Say (Orbit 18)" by Damon Knight
- "Ladies and Gentlemen, This Is Your Crisis" by Kate Wilhelm
- "The Hand with One Hundred Fingers" by R. A. Lafferty
- "Meathouse Man" by George R. R. Martin
- "Rules of Moopsball" by Gary Cohn
- "Who Was the First Oscar to Win a Negro?" by Craig Strete
- "In Pierson's Orchestra" by Kim Stanley Robinson
- "The Memory Machine (Orbit 18)" by Damon Knight
- "Mary Margaret Road-Grader" by Howard Waldrop
- "The Family Winter of 1986" by Felix C. Gotschalk
- "The Teacher" by Kathleen M. Sidney
- "Coming Back to Dixieland" by Kim Stanley Robinson
- "A Modular Story" by Raylyn Moore
- "The M&M Seen as a Low-Yield Thermonuclear Device" by John Varley
- "The Eve of the Last Apollo" by Carter Scholz
- "Arcs and Secants (Orbit 18)" by Damon Knight

== Orbit 19 ==
Volume 19 was first published in 1977.

Table of Contents:

- "They Say (Orbit 19)" by Damon Knight
- "Lollipop and the Tar Baby" by John Varley
- "State of Grace" by Kate Wilhelm
- "Many Mansions" by Gene Wolfe
- "The Veil Over the River" by Felix C. Gotschalk
- "Fall of Pebble-Sky" by R. A. Lafferty
- Memory Machine - Quotes
- "Tomus" by Stephen Robinett
- "Under Jupiter" by Michael W. McClintock
- "To the Dark Tower Came" by Gene Wolfe
- "Vamp" by Michael Conner
- "Being of Game P-U" by Phillip Teich
- "Night Shift" by Kevin O'Donnell, Jr.
- "Going Down" by Eleanor Arnason
- "The Disguise" by Kim Stanley Robinson
- Arcs and Secants" - Afterword

== Orbit 20 ==
Volume 20 was first published in 1978.

Table of Contents:

- They Say Quotes re Science Fiction
- "Moongate" by Kate Wilhelm
- "The Novella Race" by Pamela Sargent
- "Bright Coins in Never-Ending Stream" by R. A. Lafferty
- "The Synergy Sculpture" by Terrence L. Brown
- The Memory Machine Quotes from Science Fiction
- "The Birds are Free" by Ronald Anthony Cross
- "A Right-Handed Wrist" by Stepan Chapman
- "They Made us Not To Be And They Are Not" by Phillipa C. Maddern
- "Seven American Nights" by Gene Wolfe
- Arcs and Secants - Afterword
- Index to Volumes 11-20

== Orbit 21 ==
Volume 21 was first published in 1980.

Table of Contents:

- "Introduction: About Fifteen Years of Orbit" by Damon Knight
- "Love, Death, Time, and Katie" by Richard Kearns
- "The Greening" by Eileen Roy
- "Abominable" by Carol Emshwiller
- "Underwood and the Slaughterhouse" by Raymond G. Embrak
- "Hope" by Lelia Rose Foreman
- "The Mother of the Beast" by Gordon Eklund
- "Robert Fraser: The Xenologist as Hero" by Sydelle Shamah
- "Persephone" by Rhondi Vilott
- "The Smell of the Noose, The Roar of the Blood" by John Barfoot
- "And the TV Changed Colors When She Spoke" by Lyn Schumaker
- "The Only Tune That He Could Play" by R. A. Lafferty
- "Survivors" by Rita-Elizabeth Harper
- "On the North Pole of Pluto" by Kim Stanley Robinson

== The Best from Orbit ==
The Best from Orbit was published in 1975 and reprinted stories from the first ten volumes.

Table of Contents:

- "A Sort of Introduction (Best Stories from Orbit, Volumes 1-10) by Damon Knight
- "The Secret Place" by Richard McKenna (from Orbit 1)
- "The Loolies Are Here" by Ruth Allison and Jane Rice [as by Allison Rice] (from Orbit 1)
- "The Doctor" by Ted Thomas (from Orbit 2)
- "Baby, You Were Great!" by Kate Wilhelm (from Orbit 2)
- "The Hole on the Corner" by R. A. Lafferty (from Orbit 2)
- "I Gave Her Sack and Sherry" by Joanna Russ (from Orbit 2)
- "Mother to the World" by Richard Wilson (from Orbit 3)
- "Don't Wash the Carats" by Philip José Farmer (from Orbit 3)
- "The Planners" by Kate Wilhelm (from Orbit 3)
- "The Changeling" by Gene Wolfe (from Orbit 3)
- "Passengers" by Robert Silverberg (from Orbit 4)
- "Shattered Like a Glass Goblin" by Harlan Ellison (from Orbit 4)
- "The Time Machine" by Langdon Jones (from Orbit 5)
- "Look, You Think You've Got Troubles" by Carol Carr (from Orbit 5)
- "The Big Flash" by Norman Spinrad (from Orbit 5)
- "Jim and Mary G" by James Sallis (from Orbit 7)
- "The End" by Ursula K. Le Guin (variant of Things) (from Orbit 6)
- "Continued on Next Rock" by R. A. Lafferty (from Orbit 7)
- "The Island of Doctor Death and Other Stories" by Gene Wolfe (from Orbit 7)
- "Horse of Air" by Gardner R. Dozois (from Orbit 8)
- "One Life, Furnished in Early Poverty" by Harlan Ellison (from Orbit 8)
- "Rite of Spring" by Avram Davidson (from Orbit 8)
- "The Bystander" by Thom Lee Wharton (from Orbit 8)
- "The Encounter" by Kate Wilhelm (from Orbit 8)
- "Gleepsite" by Joanna Russ (from Orbit 9)
- "Binaries", by James Sallis (from Orbit 9)
- "Al" by Carol Emshwiller (from Orbit 10)
- "Live, from Berchtesgaden" by George Alec Effinger (from Orbit 10)
