= Felix C. Gotschalk =

American psychologist and science fiction writer

- Born: 1929; Richmond, Virginia
- Died: April 20, 2002 (aged 72–73)
- Citizenship: American
- Education: Virginia Commonwealth University
- Children: 2
- Writing career
- Genre: Science fiction

Felix C. Gotschalk (September 7, 1929 – April 20, 2002) was an American psychologist and science fiction writer with a distinct, idiosyncratic style, his work marked by energetic exploration of social and sexual taboos.

== Fiction ==
Gotschalk was born in Richmond, Virginia.

He flourished in the 1970s, publishing mainly in anthologies such as Robert Silverberg's New Dimensions and Damon Knight's Orbit series, where the experimental energies of science fiction's New Wave persisted. He was the author of one novel, Growing Up in Tier 3000 (Ace Books, 1975), which shares themes and a domed city setting with a number of his short stories. During the 1980s, his stories appeared with some regularity in The Magazine of Fantasy & Science Fiction, but remain uncollected.
