= Huysman's Pets =

1986 novel by Kate Wilhelm

Huysman's Pets is a novel by Kate Wilhelm published in 1986.

== Plot summary ==
Huysman's Pets is a novel in which the geneticist Huysman created experimental animal children before he died.

== Reception ==
Dave Langford reviewed Huysman's Pets for White Dwarf #86, and stated that "The forces of injustice are defeated by ham acting, telepathy, computer hacking and forged dollars, all very quickly and quietly. Nice reading, but more suspense and genuine nastiness would have made a stronger book."

== Reviews ==
- Review by Larry D. Woods (1986) in Fantasy Review, February 1986
- Review by Debbie Notkin (1986) in Locus, #301 February 1986
- Review by E. F. Bleiler (1986) in Rod Serling's The Twilight Zone Magazine, June 1986
- Review by Tom Easton (1986) in Analog Science Fiction/Science Fact, July 1986
- Review by Don D'Ammassa (1986) in Science Fiction Chronicle, #85 October 1986
- Review by Tom Jones (1987) in Vector 137
- Review by Lee Montgomerie (1987) in Interzone, #19 Spring 1987
