= The Clone (novel) =

1965 novel by Theodore L. Thomas and Kate Wilhelm

- First Edition Cover
- Author: Theodore L. Thomas and Kate Wilhelm
- Cover artist: Hoot von Zitzewitz
- Genre: Science Fiction
- Publisher: Berkley Books
- Publication date: January 1, 1965

The Clone is a science fiction novel written by Theodore L. Thomas and Kate Wilhelm, first published by Berkley in 1965. It is based on a short story of the same name written solely by Thomas that appeared in the December 1959 edition of Fantastic Science Fiction Stories.

“Clone”, as used in the novel, is a rare but correct use of the term “clone” in science fiction. Perhaps acknowledging the uncommon usage, the novel starts with a citation:

clone, n. … Biol. The aggregate of individual organisms descended by asexual reproduction from a single sexually produced individual; … Webster's New International Dictionary, Second Ed.

The Clone was nominated for a Nebula Award for best novel in 1965, the first year the prize was awarded. Dune was the eventual winner. The Clone has been translated into six languages.

== Plot ==
The clone is an amorphous creature that is spontaneously created in the sewers of Chicago when three core ingredients from various sources are dumped into the sewage system and mix in a defective collector box warmed by a leaky steam vent: muriatic acid, trisodium phosphate, and hamburger meat.

The process begins at 12:33 a.m. Other chance ingredients combine with the first three as chemical reactions form a living soup. By 12:51 a.m., the clone is born.

The clone quickly spreads through the sewer system as it picks up nutrients and claims human victims. At 7:35 a.m., it consumes its first human, Maude Wendall, followed shortly afterward by her husband Frank.

At 7:55 a.m., it invades the restaurant kitchen where Harry Schwartz washes dishes. Even though he warns the other staff that, “it’ll eatcha,” they are careless - and he is armed with a cleaver. He is the lone survivor of the kitchen attack.

The clone absorbs all types of organic matter except cotton, leaving only salty water behind. As the novel progresses, the clone gains the ability to absorb minerals from concrete, leading to the collapse of buildings. Cotton is not touched; we never learn the reason. Fire slows the clone, but that's all. Electricity has no effect. Iodine is the only substance that harms it.

The clone expands out from 18th Street towards Michigan Avenue, threatening to go into Lake Michigan. At 7:55 a.m., it underlays ten city blocks. By 10:15, it expands to thirty. It grows to its eventual size of 100 square miles by 5:30 p.m. As the clone grows, arrogant, careless, and immoral residents are consumed. Their stories are short. There are a few heroic and some noble residents, but even many of them eventually are consumed.

Mark Kenniston, junior pathologist and acquaintance of Harry Schwartz, is the level-headed hero who identifies the clone's weakness, convinces superiors and the mayor to act, and essentially saves the city (and Lake Michigan). Harry is with him until the end - at 5:30 p.m. on the same day the disaster started.

== Short Story ==
“The Clone“ short story appeared in the December 1959 edition of Fantastic Science Fiction Stories.

The short story and the novel start much the same: the sewer, the collector box, the mixing of materials, and the prime conditions for life to spontaneously begin.

In the short story, the clone comes to life at 9:01 p.m. The first contact with human beings occurs at 7:55 a.m. the next morning. It consumes Frank and Maude Wendal by 8:02 a.m. It then attacks in the restaurant where Harry Schwartz washes dishes. By 9:52 a.m., it had “come out of the pipes in 22 private apartments, 10 restaurants, 25 food stores, an early morning movie house, 3 department stores, and various other shops.”

The police had by this time contacted the Chief Pathologist. We aren't provided his name in the short story; in the novel Kenniston is named, and demoted to junior pathologist. The Chief Pathologist leaves the city to meet with others about a strategy; in the novel, he never leaves the city. Instead, he is joined by Schwartz and together they form a heroic duo.

The city resident's panicked reaction is described in much the same way as in the novel, but with no more victims identified by name, and only cursory personal stories.

Iodine is the secret to harming the clone in both short story and novel, but the effect is slower in the short story. Technical and military personnel finish killing it, but not before it kills the city: by 3:35 p.m., it covers 200 square miles.

== Reception ==
The Clone was nominated for a Nebula Award for best novel in 1965, the first year the prize was awarded.

In a footnote of Stephen King's 1983 edition of Danse Macabre, King called The Clone a "short, but gruesomely effective horror novel."
