= Margot Arnold =

British-born American novelist

- Born: Petronelle Marguerite Mary Crouch; May 16, 1925; Devonport, Devon, England
- Died: September 22, 2016 (aged 91); New York City, New York, USA
- Occupation: Novelist
- Spouse(s): Philip Remington Cook, Jr. (1949-1978)
- Writing career
- Period: 1958–1990s
- Genre: Mystery

Petronelle Marguerite Mary Cook (née Crouch, May 16, 1925 – September 22, 2016), better known by the pseudonym of Margot Arnold, was a British-born American mystery fiction novelist.

== Biography ==
Petronelle Marguerite Mary Crouch was born on 16 May 1925 in Devonport, Devon. She received a B.A. with a Diploma in Prehistoric Archaeology and Anthropology in 1947, and an M.A. in 1950 from Oxford University.

As a mystery writer, she was best known as the creator of the Dr. Penny Spring and Sir Toby Glendower series, about an anthropologist and an archeologist based at Oxford University, England.

She was a long-time resident of Hyannis, Massachusetts. She died in New York City, New York in September 2016 at the age of 91.

== Bibliography ==
=== Single novels ===
- Portrait of Caroline (1958)
- The Officers' Woman (1972)
- The Villa On the Palatine (1975)
- Marie, Voodoo Queen (1981)
- Affairs of State (1982)
- Love Among the Allies (1985)
- Desperate Measures (1986)
- Sinister Purposes (1988)

=== Penny Spring and Sir Toby Glendower Series ===
1. Exit Actors, Dying (1979)
2. Zadok's Treasure (1979)
3. The Cape Cod Caper (1980)
4. Death of a Voodoo Doll (1982)
5. Death on the Dragon's Tongue (1982)
6. Lament for a Lady Laird (1982)
7. The Menehune Murders (1989)
8. Toby's Folly (1990)
9. The Catacomb Conspiracy (1991)
10. The Cape Cod Conundrum (1992)
11. Dirge for a Dorset Druid (1994)
12. The Midas Murders (1995)
