= Doris Piserchia =

American science fiction writer (1928–2021)

- Doris Piserchia around 1951
- Born: Doris Elaine Summers; October 11, 1928; Fairmont, West Virginia
- Died: September 15, 2021 (aged 92); Hackensack, New Jersey
- Spouse: Joseph John Piserchia
- Writing career
- Language: English
- Website: www.digitalmediatree.com/dorispiserchia/

Doris Piserchia (born Doris Summers, October 11, 1928 – September 15, 2021) was an American science fiction writer who was born and raised in Fairmont, West Virginia. She served in the United States Navy from 1950 to 1954 and after that took courses toward a Master's degree in educational psychology. She did not begin publishing until 1966. Her stories have an interest in aliens and have been termed "darkly comic" by admirers. Despite her military experience, age, and preference for older SF, she is often associated with the New Wave. Related to that she has a story in The Last Dangerous Visions. She has also been of interest to those in Feminist science fiction.

She did not publish any work after 1983, shortly before her adult daughter died suddenly, leaving her with a three-year-old granddaughter to raise. In spite of this, all thirteen of her novels were reissued by Gateway, an imprint of the Orion Publishing Group, in 2012.

Piserchia died September 15, 2021, at the age of 92.

== Bibliography ==
- Mr. Justice (1973)
- Star Rider (1974)
- A Billion Days of Earth (1976)
- Earthchild (1977)
- Spaceling (1978)
- The Spinner (1980)
- The Fluger (1980)
- Doomtime (1981)
- Earth in Twilight (1981)
- Blood County (1982) [as by Curt Selby]
- I, Zombie (1982) [as by Curt Selby]
- The Dimensioneers (1982)
- The Deadly Sky (1983)

== Sources ==
- Clute, John and Peter Nicholls (eds.). The Encyclopedia of Science Fiction. New York: St Martin's Griffin, 1995. ISBN 0-312-13486-X.
