= Baby, You Were Great =

1968 short story by Kate Wilhelm

"Baby, You Were Great" is a 1968 science fiction short story by American writer Kate Wilhelm. It was first published in Orbit 2.

Damon Knight—Wilhelm's husband—stated that "Baby, You Were Great" was inspired by his 1964 story, "Semper Fi", "with whose point of view Wilhelm disagreed", and that it is "in a sense, the same story [as 'Semper Fi', but] with an entirely different plot, setting, and cast of characters."

== Synopsis ==
In a world where technology allows the direct recording and replaying of emotional states and subjective physical sensory experiences, a casting director holds auditions to find a woman who will have a suitable reaction to being raped.

== Reception ==
"Baby, You Were Great" was a finalist for the 1968 Nebula Award for Best Short Story. It has been described as "an indictment of men's exercising technological control over women's bodies", while Strange Horizons emphasizes that the story "does not suffer in quality simply because the technology [for recording and transmitting emotions] it imagined shows no signs of arriving soon." Algis Budrys considered it to be "pretty good" with "some inventive thinking, but not in places that will reach the reader".
