= Murder of Kitty Genovese =

1964 murder in New York City

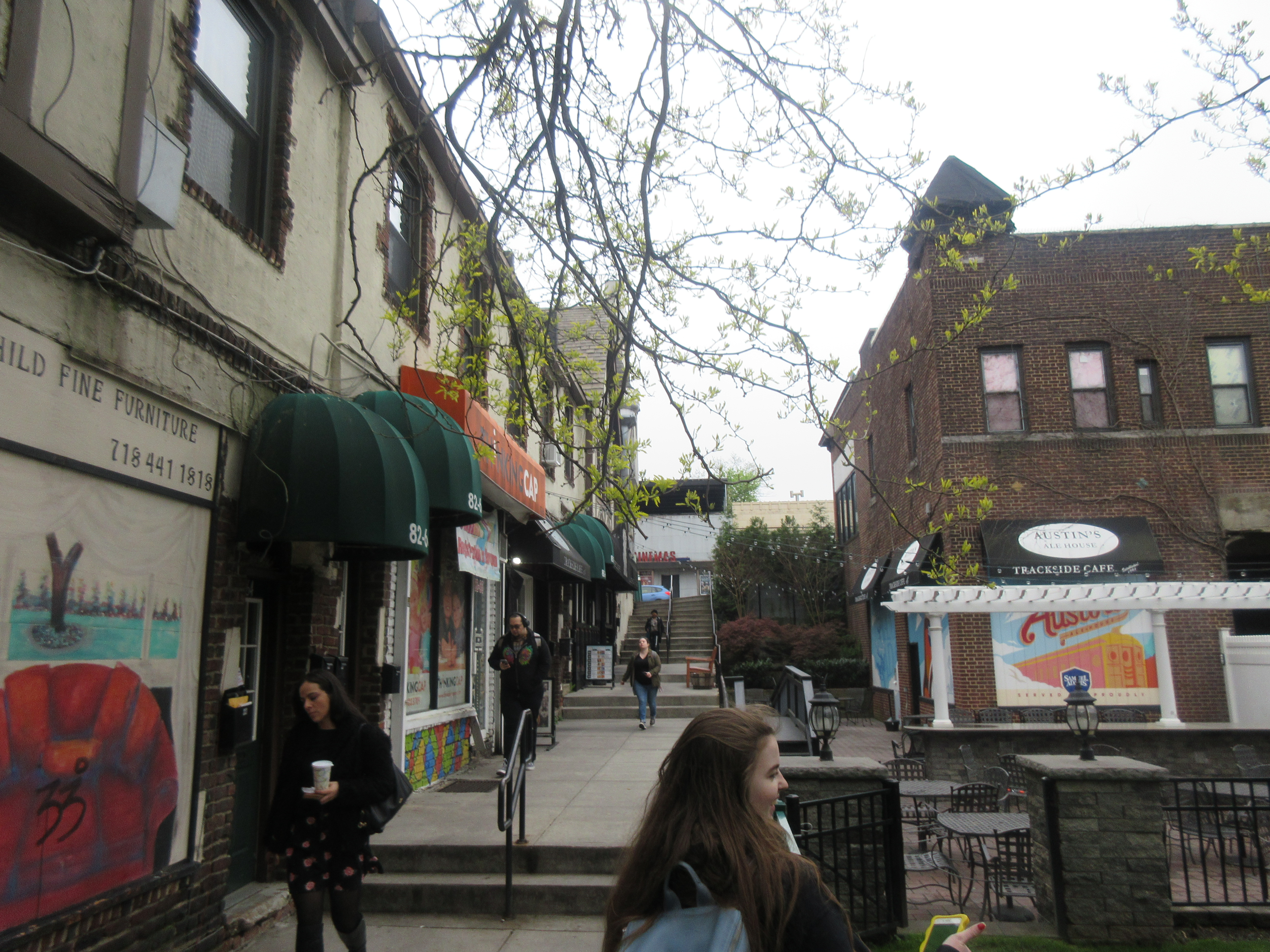
- A 2019 view of the alleyway where Kitty Genovese was murdered
- Location: 40°42′34″N 73°49′49″W; Kew Gardens, Queens, New York, U.S.
- Date: March 13, 1964
- Attack type: Robbery, rape, murder by stabbing
- Victim: Catherine "Kitty" Susan Genovese
- Perpetrator: Winston Moseley
- Motive: Femicide
- Verdict: Guilty on all counts
- Convictions: First-degree murder; Second-degree robbery; Second-degree attempted kidnapping
- Trial: June 8–11, 1964
- Sentence: 1964: Death; 1967: Commuted to life imprisonment with the possibility of parole (never granted)

Kitty Genovese, a 28-year-old bartender, was raped and stabbed to death on March 13, 1964, outside the apartment building where she lived in the Kew Gardens neighborhood of the Queens borough of New York City, United States. Two weeks after the murder, The New York Times published an article claiming that thirty-eight witnesses saw or heard the multiple attacks, and that none of them called the police until after she was dead. However, subsequent investigations revealed that the extent of public apathy was exaggerated. While some neighbors heard her cries, many did not realize the severity of the situation. The incident prompted inquiries into what became known as the bystander effect, or "Genovese syndrome", and the lack of any urgent response by many of Genovese's neighbors became a topic reviewed in U.S. psychology textbooks for the next four decades.

Researchers have since uncovered major inaccuracies in the Times article, and police interviews revealed that some witnesses had attempted to contact authorities. In 1964, reporters at a competing news organization discovered that the Times article was inconsistent with the facts, but were unwilling at the time to challenge Times editor Abe Rosenthal. In 2007, an article in American Psychologist found "no evidence for the presence of 38 witnesses, or that witnesses observed the murder, or that witnesses remained inactive". In 2016, the Times called its own reporting "flawed", stating that the original story "grossly exaggerated the number of witnesses and what they had perceived".

Winston Moseley, a 29-year-old Manhattan native, was arrested during a house burglary six days after the murder. While in custody, he confessed to killing Genovese. At his trial, Moseley was found guilty of murder and sentenced to death. His sentence was commuted to life imprisonment. Moseley died in prison on March 28, 2016, at the age of 81, having served 52 years.

== Victim ==
Kitty Genovese
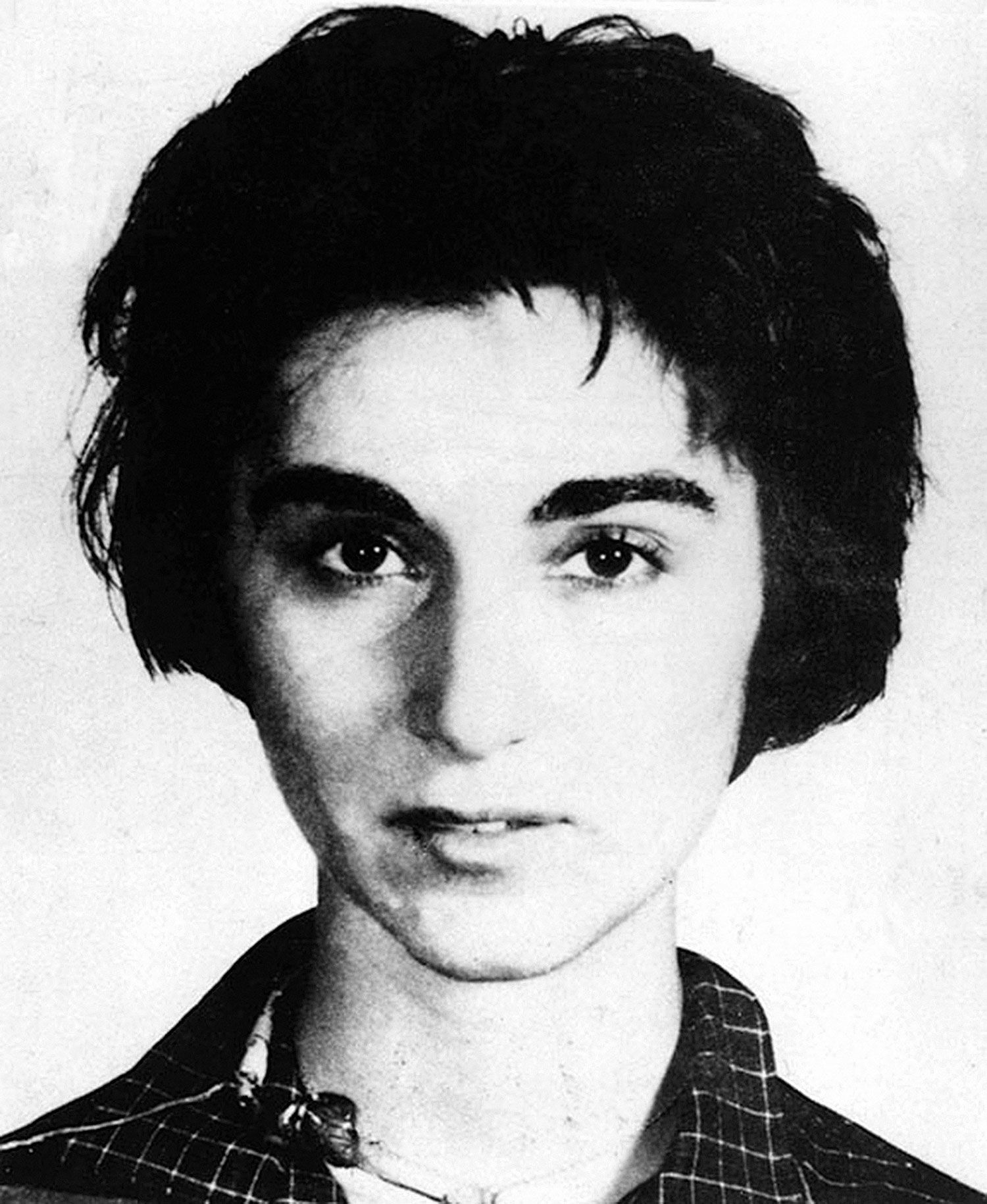
- Police mugshot taken after Genovese's 1961 arrest for bookmaking
- Born: Catherine Susan Genovese; July 7, 1935; Brooklyn, New York, U.S.
- Died: March 13, 1964 (aged 28); Kew Gardens, Queens, New York, U.S.
- Cause of death: Murder (asphyxiation from stab to lung)
- Resting place: Lakeview Cemetery; New Canaan, Connecticut, U.S.
- Occupation: Bar manager

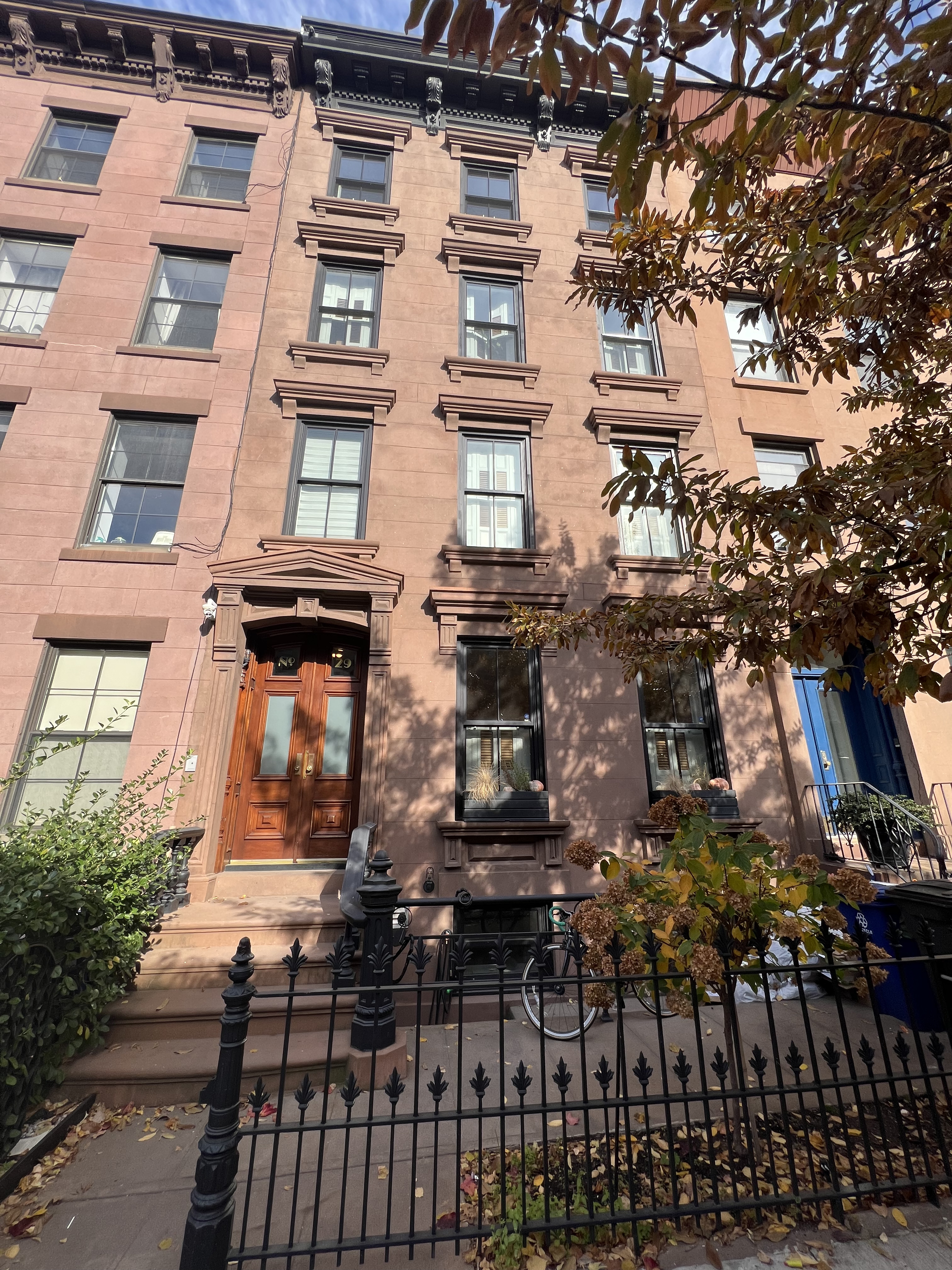
Kitty Genovese's childhood home in Park Slope, photographed in 2023

Catherine Susan "Kitty" Genovese was born in the Brooklyn borough of New York on July 7, 1935, the eldest of five children of Italian-American parents Rachel (née Giordano) and Vincent Andronelle Genovese. Genovese was raised Catholic, living in a brownstone residence at 29 St. John's Place in Park Slope, a western Brooklyn neighborhood then populated mainly by families of Italian and Irish heritage.

In her teenage years, Genovese attended the all-girl Prospect Heights High School, where she was recalled as being "self-assured beyond her years" and having a "sunny disposition". In 1954, after her mother witnessed a murder, Genovese's family moved to New Canaan, Connecticut, while Genovese, who had recently graduated from high school, remained in Brooklyn with her grandparents to prepare for her upcoming marriage. Later that year, the couple wed, but the marriage was annulled near the end of 1954 due to Genovese's lesbian sexuality.

After moving into an apartment in Brooklyn, Genovese worked in clerical jobs, which she found unappealing. By the late 1950s, she had accepted a position as a bartender. In August 1961 she was briefly arrested for bookmaking. She had been taking bets on horse races from bar patrons. She and a friend, Dee Guarnieri, were fined $50 each (equivalent to $539 in 2025) and she lost her job.

Genovese obtained another bartending position at Ev's Eleventh Hour Bar on Jamaica Avenue and 193rd Street in Hollis, Queens, and was soon managing the bar on behalf of its absentee owner. By working double shifts she was able to save money, which she intended to use to open an Italian restaurant. She shared her Kew Gardens apartment at 82–70 Austin Street with Mary Ann Zielonko, her girlfriend since 1963; Zielonko died in 2024 at the age of 85.

== Attack ==
Map of the attack

At approximately 2:30 a.m. on March 13, 1964, Genovese left Ev's Eleventh Hour Bar and began driving home in her red Fiat. While waiting for a traffic light to change on Hoover Avenue, she was spotted by Winston Moseley, who was sitting in his parked Chevrolet Corvair. Genovese arrived home around 3:15 a.m. and parked her car in the Kew Gardens Long Island Rail Road station parking lot, about 100 feet (30 m) from the door to her apartment, in an alleyway at the rear of the building. As she walked toward the building, Moseley, who had followed her home, exited his vehicle, which he had parked at a corner bus stop on Austin Street. Armed with a hunting knife, he approached Genovese.

Genovese ran toward the front of the building, and Moseley ran after her, overtook her and stabbed her twice in the back. Genovese screamed, "Oh my God, he stabbed me! Help me!" Several neighbors heard her cry, but only a few of them recognized the sound as a cry for help. When Robert Mozer, one of the neighbors, shouted at the attacker, "Let that girl alone!", Moseley ran away and Genovese slowly made her way toward the rear of the building, seriously injured and out of view of any witnesses.

Witnesses saw Moseley enter his car, drive away and return ten minutes later. Shadowing his face with a wide-brimmed hat, he systematically searched the parking lot, the train station and an apartment complex, eventually finding Genovese, who was barely conscious and lying in a hallway at the back of the building, where a locked door had prevented her from going inside. Out of view of the street and of those who may have heard or seen any sign of the initial attack, Moseley stabbed Genovese several more times before raping her, stealing $49 from her and running away again. The attacks spanned approximately half an hour, and knife wounds in Genovese's hands suggested that she attempted to defend herself. Her neighbor and close friend, Sophia Farrar, found Genovese shortly after the second attack and held her in her arms, whispering, "Help is on the way" until an ambulance arrived.

Records of the earliest calls to police are unclear, but the calls were not given a high priority; the incident occurred four years before New York City implemented the 9-1-1 emergency call system. One witness said his father called the police after the first attack and reported that a woman was "beat up, but got up and was staggering around". A few minutes after the second attack, another witness, Karl Ross, (Note: Sometimes referred to as Carl Ross, according to Pelonero) called friends for advice on what to do before calling the police. Genovese was picked up by an ambulance at 4:15 a.m., and died en route to the hospital. She was buried on March 16, 1964, in Lakeview Cemetery in New Canaan, Connecticut.

== Police investigation ==
Zielonko, Genovese's girlfriend, was questioned by Detective Mitchell Sang at 7:00 a.m. on the morning after the murder. She was later interrogated for six hours by two homicide detectives, John Carroll and Jerry Burns, whose questioning centered on her relationship with Genovese. This was also the police's focus when they questioned the couple's neighbors. Initially, Zielonko was considered to be a suspect.

On March 19, 1964, six days after the stabbing, Moseley was arrested for suspected robbery in Ozone Park after a television set was discovered in the trunk of his car. The car was searched after a local man, Raoul Cleary, became suspicious when he saw Moseley removing the television from a neighbor's house. Cleary questioned Moseley, who claimed to be a removal worker. However, after consulting another neighbor, Jack Brown, who confirmed that the homeowners were not moving, Cleary called the police. Brown disabled Moseley's car to ensure he could not flee before police arrived. A detective recalled that a white car similar to Moseley's had been reported by some of the witnesses to Genovese's murder, and he informed Detectives Carroll and Sang. During questioning, Moseley admitted to the murders of Genovese and two other women – Annie Mae Johnson, who had been shot and burned to death in her apartment in South Ozone Park a few weeks earlier; and 15-year-old Barbara Kralik, who had been killed in her parents' Springfield Gardens home the previous July.

== Perpetrator ==
Winston Moseley
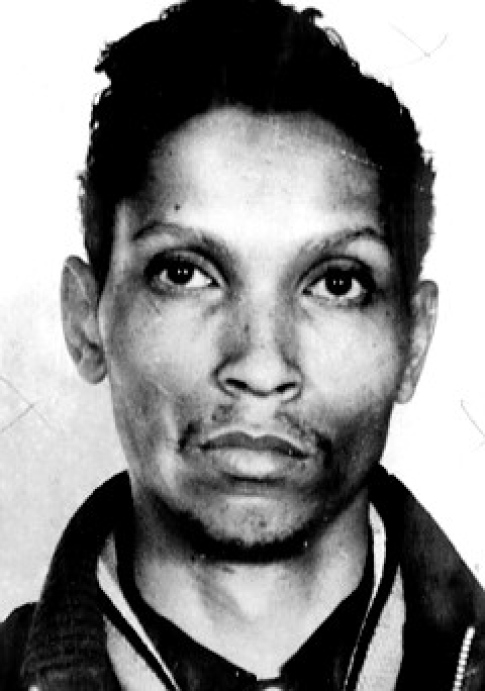
- Booking photograph (April 1, 1964)
- Born: March 2, 1935; Manhattan, New York, U.S.
- Died: March 28, 2016 (aged 81); Clinton Correctional Facility, Dannemora, New York, U.S.
- Occupation: Remington Rand machine operator
- Children: 3
- Motive: Femicide
- Convictions: First degree murder Second degree attempted kidnapping Second degree robbery
- Penalty: Death; commuted to life imprisonment

Details
- State: New York
- Killed: 1 convicted 3 confessed

Winston Moseley was 29 years old at the time he murdered Genovese. He was from Ozone Park, Queens, and worked at Remington Rand as a tab operator, preparing the punched cards used at the time for data processing, business computing and data tabulation. Moseley was married with three children and had no criminal record.

While in custody, Moseley confessed to killing Genovese. He detailed the attack, corroborating the physical evidence at the scene. He said that his motive for the attack was simply "to kill a woman", saying he preferred to kill women because "they were easier and didn't fight back". Moseley stated that he got up that night around 2 a.m., while his wife was working nights as a registered nurse, and drove through Queens to find a victim.

Moseley saw Genovese on her way home and followed her to the parking lot before killing her. He also confessed to murdering and sexually assaulting two other women and to committing between thirty and forty burglaries. Subsequent psychiatric examinations suggested that Moseley was a necrophile.

=== Trial ===
Moseley was charged with the murder of Genovese but was not charged with the other two murders he had admitted to. For the police, a complicating factor was that another man, Alvin Mitchell, had also confessed to the murder of Barbara Kralik.

Moseley's trial began on June 8, 1964, and was presided over by Judge J. Irwin Shapiro. Moseley initially pleaded not guilty, but his attorney later changed his plea to not guilty by reason of insanity. During his testimony, Moseley described the events on the night he murdered Genovese, along with the two other murders to which he had confessed and numerous other burglaries and rapes. The jury deliberated for seven hours before returning a guilty verdict at around 10:30 p.m on June 11. On June 15, Moseley was sentenced to death for the murder of Genovese. When the jury foreman read the sentence, Moseley showed no emotion, while some spectators applauded and cheered. Shapiro added, "I don't believe in capital punishment, but when I see a monster like this, I wouldn't hesitate to pull the switch myself."

On June 23, Moseley appeared as a defense witness in the trial of Alvin Mitchell for the murder of Barbara Kralik. After being granted immunity from prosecution, he testified that he had killed Kralik. The trial produced a hung jury, but Mitchell was convicted in a second trial.

On June 1, 1967, the New York Court of Appeals found that Moseley should have been able to argue that he was medically insane at the sentencing hearing when the trial court found that he had been legally sane, and the sentence was reduced to life imprisonment.

=== Imprisonment and death ===
On March 18, 1968, Moseley escaped while being transported back to prison from Meyer Memorial Hospital in Buffalo, where he had undergone minor surgery for a self-inflicted injury. He hit the transporting correctional officer, stole his weapon and fled to a nearby vacant house owned by a Grand Island couple, Mr. and Mrs. Matthew Kulaga, where he stayed undetected for three days. On March 21, the Kulagas went to check on the house, where they encountered Moseley, who held them hostage for more than an hour, binding and gagging Mr. Kulaga and raping Mrs. Kulaga. He then took the couple's car and fled.

Moseley traveled to Grand Island where, on March 22, he broke into another house and held a woman and her daughter hostage for two hours before releasing them unharmed. He surrendered to police shortly afterward and was charged with escape and kidnapping, to which he pleaded guilty. Moseley was given two additional fifteen-year sentences to run concurrently with his life sentence.

In September 1971, Moseley participated in the Attica Prison riot. Later in the same decade, he obtained a Bachelor of Arts in sociology in prison from Niagara University. He became eligible for parole in 1984. During his first parole hearing, he told the parole board that the notoriety he faced due to his crimes made him a victim, stating, "For a victim outside, it's a one-time or one-hour or one-minute affair, but for the person who's caught, it's forever." At the same hearing, Moseley claimed he never intended to kill Genovese and that he considered her murder to be a mugging because "people do kill people when they mug them sometimes." The board denied his request for parole.

Moseley returned for a parole hearing on March 13, 2008, the 44th anniversary of Genovese's murder, and was again denied parole. Genovese's brother Vincent was unaware of the 2008 hearing until he was contacted by reporters for the New York Daily News. He has reportedly never recovered from his sister's murder. "This brings back what happened to her", Vincent had said; "the whole family remembers".

Moseley was denied parole an eighteenth time in November 2015 and died in prison on March 28, 2016, at the age of 81. He had served 52 years, making him one of the longest-serving inmates in the New York State prison system.

== Reaction ==
=== Public reaction ===
The murder did not receive much immediate media attention. It took a remark from New York City Police Commissioner Michael J. Murphy to New York Times metropolitan editor Abe Rosenthal over lunch – Rosenthal later quoted Murphy as saying, "That Queens story is one for the books" – to motivate the Times into publishing an investigative report. The article "37 Who Saw Murder Didn't Call the Police", written by Martin Gansberg and published two weeks after the murder, claimed thirty-eight witnesses saw the murder and, while none called the police during the assault, one did call after Genovese had died. The public view of the story crystallized around a quote from the article by an unidentified neighbor who saw part of the attack but deliberated before finally getting another neighbor to call the police, saying, "I didn't want to get involved." Many then saw the story of Genovese's murder as emblematic of the callousness or apathy of life in big cities, and New York in particular.

Science-fiction author and cultural provocateur Harlan Ellison stated that "thirty-eight people watched" Genovese "get knifed to death in a New York street". His June 1988 article in The Magazine of Fantasy and Science Fiction (later reprinted in his book Harlan Ellison's Watching) referred to the murder as "witnessed by thirty-eight neighbors, not one of whom made the slightest effort to save her, to scream at the killer, or even to call the police". He cited reports he claimed to have read that one man, "viewing the murder from his third-floor apartment window, stated later that he rushed to turn up his radio so he wouldn't hear the woman's screams".

Public reaction to murders happening in the neighborhood supposedly did not change. According to a Times article dated December 27, 1974, ten years after Genovese's murder, 25-year-old Sandra Zahler was beaten to death early Christmas morning in an apartment within a building that overlooked the site of the Genovese attack. Neighbors again said they heard screams and "fierce struggles" but did nothing.

In an interview on NPR on March 3, 2014, Kevin Cook, author of Kitty Genovese: The Murder, the Bystanders, the Crime That Changed America, said:

Thirty-eight witnesses – that was the story that came from the police. And it really is what made the story stick. Over the course of many months of research, I wound up finding a document that was a collection of the first interviews. Oddly enough, there were 49 witnesses. I was puzzled by that until I added up the entries themselves. Some of them were interviews with two or three people [who] lived in the same apartment. I believe that some harried civil servant gave that number to the police commissioner who gave it to Rosenthal, and it entered the modern history of America after that.

Two decades after the murder, the Chicago Tribune began an article titled "Justice in the wrong hands" by saying:

Twenty years later, in the same city, a man known in headlines as the "subway vigilante" and the "Death Wish gunman" shoots four teenage boys on a subway and a disturbing number of voices express delight... Miss Genovese screamed for more than a half-hour ... the public reaction is ... disbelief that law enforcement authorities will protect people against street crime, and in its display of belief that the rule of force is all that is left."

=== Psychological research ===
Harold Takooshian, writing in Psychology Today, stated that:

In his book, Rosenthal asked a series of behavioral scientists to explain why people do or do not help a victim and he found none could offer an evidence-based answer. How ironic that this same question was answered separately by a non-scientist. When the killer was apprehended, and Chief of Detectives Albert Seedman asked him how he dared to attack a woman in front of so many witnesses, the psychopath calmly replied, 'I knew they wouldn't do anything, people never do'

— Seedman & Hellman, 1974, p. 100.

Psychologist Frances Cherry has suggested the interpretation of the murder as an issue of bystander intervention is incomplete. She has pointed to additional research such as that of Borofsky and Shotland demonstrating that people, especially at that time, were unlikely to intervene if they believed a man was attacking his wife or girlfriend. She has suggested that the issue might be better understood in terms of male/female power relations.

The apparent lack of reaction by numerous neighbors purported to have watched the scene or to have heard Genovese's cries for help, although erroneously reported, prompted research into diffusion of responsibility and the bystander effect. Social psychologists John M. Darley and Bibb Latané started this line of research, showing that contrary to common expectations, larger numbers of bystanders decrease the likelihood that someone will step forward and help a victim. The reasons include the fact that onlookers see that others are not helping either, that onlookers believe others will know better how to help, and that onlookers feel uncertain about helping while others are watching. The Genovese case thus became a classic feature of social psychology textbooks in the United States and the United Kingdom.

In September 2007, American Psychologist published an examination of the factual basis of coverage of the Genovese murder in psychology textbooks. The three authors concluded that the story was more parable than fact, largely because of inaccurate newspaper coverage at the time of the incident. According to the authors, "despite this absence of evidence, the story continues to inhabit our introductory social psychology textbooks (and thus the minds of future social psychologists)." A survey of ten leading undergraduate psychology textbooks found the Genovese case in all ten of them, with eight textbooks suggesting that witnesses watched from their windows as Genovese was murdered, and two textbooks stating that some or most of the witnesses heard but could not see the attack.

== Inaccuracy of original reports ==
More recent investigations have questioned the original version of events. A 2004 article in the Times by Jim Rasenberger, published on the fortieth anniversary of Genovese's murder, raised numerous questions about claims in the original Times article. A 2007 study (confirmed in 2014) found many of the purported facts about the murder to be unfounded, stating there was "no evidence for the presence of 38 witnesses, or that witnesses observed the murder, or that witnesses remained inactive". After Moseley's death in March 2016, the Times called their second story "flawed", stating:

While there was no question that the attack occurred, and that some neighbors ignored cries for help, the portrayal of 38 witnesses as fully aware and unresponsive was erroneous. The article grossly exaggerated the number of witnesses and what they had perceived. None saw the attack in its entirety. Only a few had glimpsed parts of it, or recognized the cries for help. Many thought they had heard lovers or drunks quarreling. There were two attacks, not three. And afterward, two people did call the police. A 70-year-old (Note: This might be an error from the author, as the woman who reportedly helped her, Sophia Farrar (b. 1928), was 36 at the time.) woman ventured out and cradled the dying victim in her arms until they arrived. Ms. Genovese died on the way to a hospital.

Because of the layout of the apartment building and the fact that the attacks took place in different locations, no witness saw the entire sequence of events. Investigation by police and prosecutors showed that approximately a dozen individuals had heard or seen portions of the attack, though none saw or were aware of the entire incident. Only one witness, Joseph Fink, was aware Genovese was stabbed in the first attack, and only Karl Ross was aware of it in the second attack. Many were entirely unaware that an assault or homicide had taken place; some thought what they saw or heard was a domestic quarrel, a drunken brawl or a group of friends leaving the bar when Moseley first approached Genovese. After the initial attack punctured her lungs, leading to her eventual death from asphyxiation, it is unlikely that Genovese was able to scream at any volume.

A 2015 documentary titled The Witness, featuring Genovese's brother William, discovered that other crime reporters knew of many problems with the story even in 1964. Immediately after the story broke, WNBC police reporter Danny Meehan discovered many inconsistencies in the original Times article, asking Gansberg why his article failed to reveal that witnesses did not feel that a murder was happening. Gansberg replied, "It would have ruined the story." Not wishing to jeopardize his career by attacking a powerful figure like Rosenthal, Meehan kept his findings secret and passed his notes to fellow WNBC reporter Gabe Pressman. As a journalism instructor, Pressman taught a course in which some of his students called Rosenthal and confronted him with the evidence. Rosenthal was irate that his editorial decisions were being questioned by journalism students and angrily berated Pressman in a phone call.

On October 12, 2016, the Times appended an Editor's Note to the online version of its 1964 article, stating that, "Later reporting by The Times and others has called into question significant elements of this account."

== Creation of 9-1-1 ==
New York radio station WNYC, in 2014, reported on how "An Iconic Murder Helped Create the 9-1-1 System".

A confirming PBS report wrote how "papers and media outlets ran with the story;" they also added "nearly a dozen books" and when it came to film, mentioned "James Solomon's film The Witness" more than once. (Note: A NYTimes 2016 lookback also cited that film: "... such as 'The Witness,' a documentary about Ms. G ...") The report's "The Genesis of 911" section noted that "Up until the late 1960s, there was no centralized number for people to call in case of an emergency."

== In popular culture ==
The story of the witnesses who did nothing "is taught in every introduction-to-psychology textbook in the United States and Britain, and in many other countries and has been made popularly known through television programs and books", and songs. It also now appears that the Kitty Genovese investigation and story was linked to false confessions in other cases.

WNYC, PBS and The New York Times lookback articles referenced in particular one film (The Witness) and have noted the cumulative impact of the murder to the development of the 911 system. (Note: Before 1968, the only way to reach the police was by dialing '0' to reach an operator in hopes they were not too busy to transfer one's call.)

=== Film and television ===
- A Perry Mason episode, "The Case of the Silent Six" (November 21, 1965), portrays the brutal beating of a young woman whose screams for help are ignored by the six residents of her small apartment building. The "get involved" quote is spoken once by Paul Drake and paraphrased by several other characters.
- An American television movie, Death Scream (1975), starring Raúl Juliá, was based on the murder.
- The Law & Order episode "Remand" (1996) is loosely based on the Genovese case, as is the Law & Order: SVU episode "41 Witnesses" (2015). In the season 1 Law & Order episode "The Violence of Summer" (1991), Detective Logan remarks: "It's the post-Kitty Genovese era, nobody wants to look, they think they'll get involved", when lamenting the lack of witnesses to a rape.
- The 1999 vigilante film The Boondock Saints references Genovese's murder in the opening credits during a church sermon about the indifference of man.
- History's Mysteries, episode 15.2 "Silent Witnesses: The Kitty Genovese Murder" (2006) on the History Channel, is a documentary of the murder.
- The film 38 témoins (2012, 38 Witnesses), directed by Lucas Belvaux, is based on Didier Decoin's 2009 novel about the case and reset in Le Havre, France.
- Season 2, episode 1 of the Investigation Discovery Channel's A Crime to Remember series, "38 Witnesses" (2014), is about the Genovese murder.
- The 2015 film The Witness reexamines the murder with interviews of both Genovese's and her killer's families.
- The 2016 film 37 is a fictional account of the night Genovese was murdered.
- Season 5, episode 7 of Girls (2016), "Hello Kitty" follows the characters as they navigate through an interactive theatrical version of Genovese's murder.

=== Literature ===
- Genovese's murder inspired Harlan Ellison's short story "The Whimper of Whipped Dogs", first published in Bad Moon Rising: An Anthology of Political Forebodings (1973).
- The DC comic book series Watchmen (1986–1987) by Alan Moore and Dave Gibbons references Genovese's murder as a key influence behind the character Rorschach's transformation into a vigilante. In the book, Rorschach's mask is fashioned from cloth taken from a (fictional) dress Kitty Genovese had custom made. The Rorschach comic series (2020–2021), a distant sequel by Tom King, also references Genovese's murder. The prequel series Nite Owl likewise references the event.
- In his book, The Tipping Point (2000), Malcolm Gladwell refers to the case and the "bystander effect" as evidence of contextual cues for human responses.
- Ryan David Jahn's novel Good Neighbors (2009) is based on the murder.
- In the book "No One Helped": Kitty Genovese, New York City, and the Myth of Urban Apathy (2016), by Marcia M. Gallo, won in the category of LGBT Nonfiction at the Lambda Literary Awards.

=== Music ===
- Genovese's murder inspired folk singer Phil Ochs to write the song "Outside of a Small Circle of Friends", released on the album Pleasures of the Harbor (1967) and as a single. This song relates five different situations that should demand action on the part of the narrator – one of them a woman outside being stabbed – but in each case the narrator concludes: "I'm sure it wouldn't interest anybody outside of a small circle of friends".
- Following the killing of Meredith Hunter at the Altamont Free Concert in 1969, KSAN put on a four-hour telephone call-in program to discuss the events. A woman who called in gave details about the violent behavior of Hells Angels at the show and said people didn't stop them because "we were all in terror of them". At the concert, she had tried to speak up against the violence, but was warned to be quiet by the people around her, for fear of being beaten. In his response, KSAN's Scoop Nisker mentioned the bystander effect and the Genovese story.
- The crime inspired singer Ruby Lynn Reyner from the band Ruby and the Rednecks to write the song "Kitty", originally released on the album From the Wrong Side of Town (2004).
- The song "Big Bird" by AJJ on their 2011 album Knife Man references the Genovese murder.
- Korean indie rock band Nell wrote the song "Dear Genovese" for their album Newton's Apple in 2014, inspired by these events.

=== Theatre ===
- English composer Will Todd's music theatre work, The Screams of Kitty Genovese (1999), is based on the murder.
- The Spanish theatre company Groc Teatre produced a theatrical piece titled 'Genovese,' based on the Kitty Genovese case. This production won the Max Award (equivalent to the Tony awards in Spain) and was directed by Miguel Ferrando-Rocher.

=== Art ===
American artist Jerome Witkin created a painting titled "The Screams of Kitty Genovese". A nude woman sits on a bed and seems distracted by sounds outside a window. A man in the room looks on.

== See also ==
- Crime in New York City
- Death of Cristina and Violetta Djeordsevic (Italy)
- Death of Wang Yue (China)
- Murder of Piang Ngaih Don (Singapore)
- Social loafing
- Volunteer's dilemma
