= Carol Carr =

American woman from the state of Georgia

Carol Scott Carr
- Born: Carol Scott Carr; 1939 (age 86–87)
- Spouse: Hoyt Scott (?–1995, his death)

Carol Scott Carr (born 1939) is an American woman from the state of Georgia who became the center of a widely publicized debate over euthanasia when she killed her two adult sons because they had Huntington's disease.

== Killing and trial ==
Huntington's disease is an autosomal dominant disorder, inherited from Carol Carr's husband, Hoyt Scott. Hoyt, a factory worker, had lost a sister to the disease as well as a brother, who committed suicide after being diagnosed. Hoyt's condition deteriorated and he died unable to move, swallow, or speak in 1995. By then, their oldest sons, Randy and Andy, were both showing symptoms of the disease.

On June 8, 2002, Carr killed both men in the room they shared at SunBridge Nursing Home in Griffin, Georgia. Both men died of a single gunshot wound to the head. After the shootings, Carol Carr, who was then 63, calmly walked to the lobby and waited for police. When questioned by police on the night of the shooting, Carol Carr told them that she had killed her sons in order to end their suffering. The lead detective on the case told Lee Williams, the Griffin Daily News crime reporter who broke the story, that he classified the murders as a "mercy killing." James Scott of Hampton, Georgia, Carr's only remaining son, who by that time also suffered from Huntington's disease, supported his mother and claimed that she acted out of love, not malice. Watching his brothers suffer in agony for 20 years had taken an emotional toll on both him and his mother. "I sat there and watched them with bed sores," he said. "It's just a miserable way to live. They couldn't talk. They couldn't communicate with each other. They would mumble." James Scott also said that his mother had taken excellent care of his brothers while they resided at the nursing home, visiting frequently, changing their bed linens, and bringing them drinks.

Carr pleaded guilty to assisted suicide and was sentenced to five years in prison in early 2003. After serving 21 months, she was released on parole in early 2004. The parole board mandated that she would be prohibited from serving as primary caregiver for her son James. They also stipulated that Carr must receive mental-health counseling during her period of supervision.

== Opinion and reaction ==
Many in Carr's hometown came to her defense. Brown University Professor Jacob Appel was publicly and vocally critical of the case against Carr. He claimed that Spalding County District Attorney Bill McBroom's decision to prosecute Carr "raises both ignorance and cruelty to new heights."

== See also ==
- Right to die
- Bioethics
