= Bad Moon Rising: An Anthology of Political Forebodings =

1973 anthology edited by Thomas M. Disch

Bad Moon Rising: An Anthology of Political Foreboding
- Cover of first edition (hardcover)
- Editor: Thomas M. Disch
- Language: English
- Genre: Science fiction
- Publisher: Harper & Row
- Publication date: 1973
- Publication place: United States
- Media type: Print (hardcover)
- Pages: 302

Bad Moon Rising: An Anthology of Political Forebodings was a science fiction short story anthology edited by Thomas M. Disch, published in 1973. The title is taken from the 1969 song "Bad Moon Rising" by the rock band Creedence Clearwater Revival.

== Contents ==
- "Introduction: On the Road to 1984" by Thomas M. Disch
- "Ho Chi Minh Elegy" by Peter Schjeldahl
- "Elegy for Janis Joplin" by Marilyn Hacker
- "We Are Dainty Little People" by Charles Naylor
- "Strangers" by Carol Emshwiller
- "Relatives" by George Alec Effinger
- "Riding" by Norman Rush
- "An Apocalypse: Some Scenes from European Life" by Michael Moorcock
- "The Great Wall of Mexico" by John Sladek
- "The Whimper of Whipped Dogs" by Harlan Ellison
- "The Village" by Kate Wilhelm
- "In Behalf of the Product" by Kit Reed
- "Hour of Trust" by Gene Wolfe
- "Fighting Fascism" by Norman Rush
- "Cold Turkey" by Rod Padgett and Dick Gallup
- "Where Have All the Followers Gone?" by Raylyn Moore
- "An Outline of History" by Malcolm Braly
- "Two Sadnesses" by George Alec Effinger
- "Everyday Life in the Later Roman Empire" by Thomas M. Disch (part of 334.)
- "Untoward Occurrence at Embassy Poetry Reading" by Marilyn Hacker
- "For Apollo 11" by Peter Schjeldahl
- "Some Notes on the Predynastic Epoch" by Robert Silverberg

== Reception ==
Theodore Sturgeon praised the story selection, citing Disch for his "precise compassionate sense of balance and taste."

== Awards ==
Bad Moon Rising was nominated for the Locus Award for Best Original Anthology in 1974.
