= Welcome, Chaos =

1983 novel by Kate Wilhelm

- Author: Kate Wilhelm
- Publication date: 1983

Welcome, Chaos is a novel by Kate Wilhelm published in 1983.

== Plot summary ==
Lyle Taney has left her post as a historian to study raptors in the mountains of Oregon. She gets along with her neighbors, Carmen and Saul. A CIA agent approaches her with suspicions that they are involved in drug dealing and persuades her to spy on them for him. She discovers that they are not criminals, but scientists. They have discovered a substance that makes people immortal while leaving them unable to have children. But it has a second, more drastic pair of side effects: it is instantly fatal to half the people who take it, but survivors become immune to radiation, leaving them unaffected by the fallout from any possible nuclear war. This has potentially very dark consequences. If only a few humans have immunity, they hold terrifying power over those who do not. This is what motivates the CIA agent because it turns out he is corrupt. The scientists have been giving the substance secretly to small groups around the world to prevent any one side in the Cold War from having dominance, but they are trying to dodge the CIA agent. They eventually have to confront the President of the United States with the quandary of facing either a war entailing Mutually Assured Destruction or the release of a substance that will kill half the population.

== Reception ==
Dave Langford reviewed Welcome, Chaos for White Dwarf #77, and stated that "Wilhelm maintains tight suspense and high-class characterization to the bitter end. . . nor does she shirk the moral issues."

== Reviews ==
- Review by Debbie Notkin (1983) in Locus, #271 August 1983
- Review by Baird Searles (1984) in Isaac Asimov's Science Fiction Magazine, March 1984
- Review by Tom Easton (1984) in Analog Science Fiction/Science Fact, May 1984
- Review by Algis Budrys (1985) in The Magazine of Fantasy & Science Fiction, July 1985
- Review by Don D'Ammassa (1985) in Science Fiction Chronicle, #73 October 1985
- Review by Chris Bailey (1986) in Vector 133
