= Linda Cajio =

American novelist

Linda Maríe Cajio
- Born: August 3, 1953; Philadelphia, PA
- Died: February 20, 2017 (aged 63); Willingboro, NJ
- Occupation: Novelist
- Writing career
- Pen name: Linda Cajio
- Period: 1986–2000
- Genre: romance

Linda Cajio is an American writer of over 30 romance novels. She started writing contemporary romances in 1986 for Loveswept, and she also wrote historical romances for Kensington and Zebra. She was nominee from Romantic Times Magazine to Best Harlequin American in 1997 and to Series Romantic Fantary in 1999.

== Bibliography ==
=== Single novels ===
- All Is Fair... (1986)
- Hard Habit to Break (1986)
- Double Dealing (1987)
- Silk on the Skin (1988)
- Strictly Business (1988)
- The Reluctant Prince (1992)
- Dancing in the Dark (1993)
- Colorado Gold (1993)
- Irresistible Stranger (1994)
- The Perfect Catch (1995)
- Hot and Bothered (1995)
- Knight's Song (1996)
- A Tender Masquerade (1997)

=== Roberts-Windsor Series ===
1. Rescuing Diana (1987)
2. At First Sight (1988)

=== Kittredge Family Saga ===
1. Desperate Measures (1989)
2. Unforgettable (1989)
3. Just One Look (1990)
4. Nights in White Satin (1991)
5. Earth Angel (1991)
6. Night Music (1991)

=== The Holiday Heart Saga ===
1. Doctor Valentine (1997)
2. Bachelor Daddy (1997)
3. Boss Man (1997)
4. Mister Christmas (1997)
5. Doorstep Daddy (1998)

=== Only Dad Series Multi-Author ===
- Me and Mrs. Jones (1993)

=== Treasured Tales II Series Multi-Author ===
- He's So Shy (1994)

=== The Ultimate… Series Multi-Author ===
- House Husband (1998)

=== The Daddy Club Series Multi-Author ===
- Family to Be (2000)

=== Collections ===
- Diamond Daddies (1999)
