= Jim Rasenberger =

American historian

Jim Rasenberger is an American writer, born in Washington, D.C. and living in New York City. He has published five books of nonfiction, and contributed to many publications, including the New York Times, Vanity Fair, and Smithsonian.

In February 2004, Rasenberger wrote an influential article that was published by the New York Times about the 1964 murder of Kitty Genovese. Rasenberger's article revealed that the original March 27, 1964, news story about the murder had been exaggerated by A. M. Rosenthal, metropolitan editor for the New York Times, contained multiple inaccuracies, including factually incorrect reporting that none of the 37 witnesses rendered aid or even called police.

Rasenberger's book The Brilliant Disaster about the Bay of Pigs Invasion during JFK's administration, was named by Kirkus Reviews as one of the best nonfiction books of 2011. The Miami Herald pointed out that while Rasenberger had a personal connection to the story—his father was a lawyer who aided the Kennedy brothers’ efforts to free the jailed Cuban rebels—“he is no apologist for the administration; he concedes the arrogance and incompetence that blinded the so-called best and brightest to the invasion plan’s glaring flaws.”

Rasenberger is a graduate of Dartmouth College.

== Publications ==
- A Perfect Coincidence: The Extraordinary Friendship and Astonishing Deaths of John Adams and Thomas Jefferson New York: Scribner, 2026.
- Revolver: Sam Colt and the Six-Shooter that Changed America New York: Scribner, 2020.
- The Brilliant Disaster: JFK, Castro, and America's Doomed Invasion of Cuba's Bay of Pigs New York: Scribner, 2011. In over 900 libraries according to WorldCat
- America, 1908: The Dawn of Flight, the Race to the Pole, the Invention of the Model T, and the Making of a Modern Nation New York: Scribner, 2007. In over 700 libraries according to WorldCat
- High Steel: The Daring Men who Built the World's Greatest Skyline New York, NY: Harper Collins, 2004. In over 500 libraries according to WorldCat
