= Theodore L. Thomas =

American novelist

Theodore Lockard Thomas (April 13, 1920 – September 24, 2005) was an American chemical engineer and patent attorney who wrote more than 50 science fiction short stories, published between 1952 and 1981. He also collaborated on two novels with Kate Wilhelm, as well as producing stories under the pseudonyms of Leonard Lockhard and Cogswell Thomas, and was nominated for the 1967 Nebula Award for Best Short Story ("The Doctor") and for a Hugo Award.

== Bibliography ==
=== Nonfiction ===
- "The Watery Wonders of Captain Nemo" (Galaxy Science Fiction, December 1961)

=== Collaborations with Kate Wilhelm ===
- The Clone (1965, expanded from his 1959 short story of the same name)
- The Year of the Cloud (1970)

=== Short stories ===
- "The Far Look", in Astounding Science Fiction, August 1956
- "Ceramic Incident", in Astounding Science Fiction, October 1956
- "The Innocents’ Refuge", in Science Fiction Stories, May 1957
- "The Tour", in The Magazine of Fantasy & Science Fiction, 1957
- "Satellite Passage", in If, December 1958 (Also available in The Best of the Best Part One)
- "Day of Succession", in Astounding Science Fiction, August 1959
- "The Clone", in Fantastic, December 1959
- "December 28th", in Playboy, December 1959
- "The Intruder", in Fantasy and Science Fiction, February 1961
- "Test", in Fantasy and Science Fiction, April 1962
- "The Weather Man", in Analog Science Fiction and Fact, June 1962
- "The Lonely Man", in Galaxy, April 1963
- "The Ice Ages", in Fantasy and Science Fiction, April 1965
- "Science Springboard, The: Smog", article in Fantasy and Science Fiction, January 1966
- "The Doctor", in Orbit 2, 1967
- "The Weather on the Sun", in Orbit 8, 1970 (Also available in The Science Fictional Solar System)
- "Early Bird", in Astounding: John W. Campbell Memorial Anthology, 1973
- "The Splice", in Fantasy and Science Fiction, March 1981

=== As Cogswell Thomas ===
- "Paradise Regained", in Saving Worlds, 1973 (in collaboration with Theodore Cogswell)

=== As Leonard Lockhard ===
- "Improbable Profession" (1952), in Astounding, September 1952 (co-written with Charles L. Harness)
- "The Lagging Profession" (1961)
- "The Professional Approach" (1962), in "Analog", September 1962
