= Kate Wilhelm =

American science fiction writer (1928–2018)

- Born: Katie Gertrude Meredith; June 8, 1928; Toledo, Ohio, U.S.
- Died: March 8, 2018 (aged 89); Eugene, Oregon, U.S.
- Occupation: Author
- Spouses: Joseph Wilhelm (m. 1947; div. 1962) Damon Knight (m. 1963; died 2002)
- Children: 2
- Writing career
- Period: 1956–2018
- Genres: Science fiction, mystery, fantasy

Kate Wilhelm (June 8, 1928 – March 8, 2018) was an American author. She wrote novels and stories in the science fiction, mystery, and suspense genres, including the Hugo Award–winning Where Late the Sweet Birds Sang. Wilhelm established the Clarion Workshop along with her husband Damon Knight and writer Robin Scott Wilson.

== Life ==
Katie Gertrude Meredith was born in Toledo, Ohio, daughter of Jesse and Ann Meredith. She graduated from high school in Louisville, Kentucky, and worked as a model, telephone operator, sales clerk, switchboard operator, and underwriter for an insurance company.

She married Joseph Wilhelm in 1947 and had two sons. The couple divorced in 1962 and Wilhelm married Damon Knight in 1963. She and her husband lived in Eugene, Oregon, until his death in 2002 and she remained there until her own death in 2018.

== Career ==
Her first published short fiction was "The Pint-Size Genie" in the October 1956 issue of Fantastic, edited by Paul W. Fairman (assisted by Cele Goldsmith, who was responsible for looking at unsolicited submissions to the magazine). The next year, her first accepted story, "The Mile-Long Spaceship", was published in John W. Campbell's Astounding Science Fiction, and ten of her speculative fiction stories were published during 1958 and 1959. Her debut novel was a murder mystery, More Bitter Than Death (Simon & Schuster, 1963), and her science fiction novel debut, The Clone (1965) co-written with Theodore L. Thomas, was a finalist for the annual Nebula Award.

Her work has been published in Quark/, Orbit, The Magazine of Fantasy and Science Fiction, Locus, Amazing Stories, Asimov's Science Fiction, Ellery Queen's Mystery Magazine, Fantastic, Omni, Alfred Hitchcock's Mystery Magazine, Redbook and Cosmopolitan.

She and her second husband, Damon Knight, mentored many authors and helped to establish the Clarion Writers Workshop and the Milford Writer's Workshop. After his death in 2002, Wilhelm continued to host monthly workshops, as well as lecturing at other events, until her death.

== Recognition ==
The Science Fiction and Fantasy Hall of Fame inducted Wilhelm in 2003, its eighth class of two deceased and two living writers.

In 2009, she received one of three inaugural Solstice Awards from the Science Fiction and Fantasy Writers of America (founded by Knight in 1965), which recognize "significant impact on the science fiction or fantasy landscape".

The Nebula Award trophy was designed for the first awards by J. A. Lawrence, based on a sketch by Wilhelm.

She also won a few annual genre awards for particular works:

- Nebula Award for Best Short Story, 1968, "The Planners"
- Hugo Award for Best Novel and Locus Award for Best Novel, both 1977, Where Late the Sweet Birds Sang
- Nebula Award for Best Novelette, 1986, "The Girl Who Fell into the Sky"
- Nebula Award for Best Short Story, 1987, "Forever Yours, Anna"
- Hugo Award (best related book) and Locus Award (best nonfiction), both 2006, Storyteller: Writing Lessons and More from 27 Years of the Clarion Writers' Workshop (Small Beer Press, 2005; ISBN 0-7394-5613-X)

The Hugo- and Locus Award-winning novel Where Late the Sweet Birds Sang was also a finalist for the Nebula Award, winner of the short-lived Jupiter Award from science fiction instructors, and third place for the academic John W. Campbell Memorial Award for Best Science Fiction Novel.

In 2016, the SFWA renamed the Solstice Award the Kate Wilhelm Solstice Award.

== Works ==
=== Barbara Holloway mysteries ===
Holloway is an attorney in Eugene, Oregon. She and her semi-retired lawyer father, Frank Holloway, solve mysteries that combine detective fiction with courtroom drama.

- Death Qualified: A Mystery of Chaos (1991)
- The Best Defense (1994)
- For the Defense also named Malice Prepense in hardbound editions (1996)
- Defense for the Devil (1999)
- No Defense (2000)
- Desperate Measures (2001)
- Clear and Convincing Proof (2003)
- The Unbidden Truth (2004)
- Sleight of Hand (2006)
- A Wrongful Death (2007)
- Cold Case (2008)
- Heaven Is High (2011)
- By Stone, by Blade, by Fire (2012)
- Mirror, Mirror (2017)

=== Constance Leidl and Charlie Meiklejohn mysteries ===
Meiklejohn is a former arson detective turned private investigator. His wife, Leidl, is a professional psychologist. Together they solve cases.

- The Hamlet Trap (1987)
- The Dark Door (1988)
- Smart House (1989)
- Sweet, Sweet Poison (1990)
- Seven Kinds of Death (1992)
- Whisper Her Name (2012)

==== Mystery collections ====
- A Flush of Shadows: Five Short Novels (1995) – includes "With Thimbles, With Forks, and Hope", "Torch Song", "All for One", "Sister Alice", and "Gorgon Fields"
- The Casebook of Constance and Charlie Volume 1 (1999) – includes "The Hamlet Trap", "Smart House", and "Seven Kinds of Death"
- The Casebook of Constance and Charlie Volume 2 (2000) – includes "Sweet, Sweet Poison" and "The Dark Door", plus shorter stories "Christ's Tears", "Torch Song", and "An Imperfect Gift"

==== Short stories in Ellery Queen Mystery Magazine ====
- "Christ's Tears" April 1996
- "An Imperfect Gift" Aug 1999
- "His Deadliest Enemy" Mar/Apr2004

=== Standalone mystery/suspense novels ===
- More Bitter Than Death (1962)
- The Clewiston Test (1976)
- Fault Lines (1977)
- Oh, Susannah! (1982)
- Justice for Some (1993)
- The Good Children (1998)
- The Deepest Water (2000)
- Skeletons: A Novel of Suspense (2002)
- The Price of Silence (2005)
- Death of an Artist (2012)

=== Editor ===
- Clarion SF – anthology of 15 short stories by authors such as Damon Knight, Robert Crais, and Vonda N. McIntyre
- Nebula Award Stories 9: anthology of Nebula Award–winning and nominated stories

=== SF novels, noted stories and collections ===
- The Mile-Long Spaceship (1963)
- The Clone (1965) with Theodore L. Thomas – 1966 Nebula Award nominee, Best Novel
- The Nevermore Affair (1966)
- Andover and the Android (1966)
- Baby, You Were Great (1967) – 1968 Nebula Award nominee, Best Short Story
- The Killer Thing (1967), aka The Killing Thing (1967)
- The Planners (1968) – 1969 Nebula Award winner, Best Short Story
- The Downstairs Room (1968) – collection of 14 SF short stories (Dutch translation Het Anti-Verjaardagsfeest as by Kathleen Curran)
- Let the Fire Fall (1969)
- The Year of the Cloud (1970)
- April Fool's Day Forever (1970) – 1971 Nebula Award nominee, Best Novella
- A Cold Dark Night with Snow (1970) – 1971 Nebula Award nominee, Best Short Story
- Abyss: Two Novellas (1971) – contains "The Plastic Abyss" (1992 Nebula Award nominee, Best Novella) and "Stranger in the House"
- Margaret and I (1971) - 1972 Nebula Award nominee, Best Novel
- City of Cain (1974)
- The Infinity Box (1975) – collection of nine SF short stories, including 1992 Nebula Award nominee "The Infinity Box", for Best Novella
- Where Late the Sweet Birds Sang (1976) – Hugo and Locus Award winner; Nebula nominee, Best Novel
- Somerset Dreams and Other Fiction (1978) – collection of 8 shorter SF stories/novellas
- Juniper Time (1979) – 1980 Nebula Award nominee, Best Novel
- The Winter Beach (1981) – 1982 Nebula Award nominee, Best Novella
- A Sense of Shadow (1981)
- Listen, Listen (1981) – contains four novellas: "Julian", "With Thimbles, With Forks and Hope", "Moongate", and "The Uncertain Edge of Reality"
- Welcome, Chaos (1983)
- Huysman's Pets (1985)
- Forever Yours, Anna (1987) – 1988 Nebula Award winner, Best Short Story
- Crazy Time (1988)
- Children of the Wind (1989) – contains "Children of the Wind", "The Gorgon Field" (1986 Nebula Award nominee, Best Novella), "A Brother to Dragons, A Companion of Owls", "The Blue Ladies", and "The Girl Who Fell into the Sky" (1987 Nebula Award winner, Best Novelette)
- Cambio Bay (1990)
- Naming the Flowers (1992) – 1994 Nebula Award nominee, Best Novella
- And the Angels Sing (1992) – collection of 12 SF short stories
- I Know What You're Thinking (1994) – 1995 Nebula Award nominee, Best Short Story
- Fear is a Cold Black (2010) – collection of Wilhelm's early SF short stories
- Music Makers (2012) – collection of five stories: "Music Makers", "Shadows on the Wall of the Cave", "Mockingbird", "The Late Night Train", and "An Ordinary Day with Jason"
- The Bird Cage (2012) – collection of four stories: "The Bird Cage", "Changing the World", "The Fountain of Neptune", and "Rules of the Game"

=== Poems ===
- Alternatives (1980)
- Four Seasons (1980)
- No One Listens (1980)
- The Eagle (1980)

=== Non-fiction ===
- Storyteller: Writing Lessons & More from 27 Years of the Clarion Writers' Workshop (2005)
