= Women of Wonder: The Classic Years =

Short stories anthology edited by Pamela Sargent

- Women of Wonder: The Classic Years cover
- Author: Pamela Sargent
- Language: English
- Series: Women of Wonder series
- Genre: Science fiction
- Publisher: Harcourt Brace
- Publication date: 1995
- Media type: Print (Paperback)
- Pages: 440 pp
- ISBN: 978-0-15-600031-4
- Followed by: Women of Wonder: The Contemporary Years

Women of Wonder, The Classic Years: Science Fiction by Women from the 1940s to the 1970s is an anthology of short stories, novelettes, and novellas edited by Pamela Sargent. It was published in 1995, along a companion volume, Women of Wonder, The Contemporary Years: Science Fiction by Women from the 1970s to the Present.

The collection revisits fourteen works by female science fiction authors published in the out-of-print anthologies Women of Wonder, More Women of Wonder, and The New Women of Wonder and adds seven new pieces originally published between 1944 and 1978. It also includes a history of women in science fiction and a twelve-page list of recommended readings of science fiction by women from 1818 to 1978, which has been deemed "one of the highlights of the anthology."

The Women of Wonder anthologies were one of the first science fiction collections to focus on women in science fiction both as authors and as varied and complex characters.

== Contents ==
- "Introduction: Women of Wonder, the Classic Years" - Pamela Sargent
- "No Woman Born" (1944) - C. L. Moore
- "That Only a Mother" (1948) - Judith Merril
- "Contagion" (1950) - Katherine MacLean
- "The Woman from Altair" (1951) - Leigh Brackett
- "Short in the Chest" (1954) - Margaret St. Clair
- "The Anything Box" (1956) - Zenna Henderson
- "Death Between the Stars" (1956) - Marion Zimmer Bradley
- "The Ship Who Sang" (1961) - Anne McCaffrey
- "When I Was Miss Dow" (1966) - Sonya Dorman
- "The Food Farm" (1967)- Kit Reed
- "The Heat Death of the Universe" (1967) - Pamela Zoline
- "The Power of Time" (1971) - Josephine Saxton
- "False Dawn" (1972) - Chelsea Quinn Yarbro
- "Nobody's Home" (1972) - Joanna Russ
- "The Funeral " (1972) - Kate Wilhelm
- "Of Mist, and Grass, and Sand" (1973) - Vonda N. McIntyre
- "The Women Men Don't See" (1973) - James Tiptree, Jr.
- "The Warlord of Saturn's Moons" (1974) - Eleanor Arnason
- "The Day Before the Revolution" (1974) - Ursula K. Le Guin
- "The Family Monkey" (1977) - Lisa Tuttle
- "View from a Height" (1978) - Joan D. Vinge
- About the Authors: Women of Wonder, the Classic Years
- About the Editor
- Recommended Reading: Science Fiction by Women, 1818-1978

== Reception ==
In a first review, Sally Estes assesses The Classic Years as "[a]n eye-opening overview of science fiction and women between 1944 and 1978... Exploring topics such as prejudice, child abuse, vanity, stereotypes, aging, rape, obesity, and insanity, stories by Marion Zimmer Bradley, Zenna Henderson, Kit Reed, Kate Wilhelm, Joan Vinge, the pseudonymous James Tiptree Jr., and others are as disconcerting as they are intriguing." She later extols the editorial work of Pamela Sargent for this follow up to the Women of Wonder series:

What makes the two volumes so fine is not only their sheer variety of stories, writing styles, and themes, but also Sargent's perceptive introduction to each anthology (together, these essays provide a canny overview of women in science fiction) and each book's extensive lists of novels, collections, anthologies, and short fiction for further reading. A veritable feast for SF fans.
