= Quark/ =

American science fiction anthology

- Quark/1, Quark/2, Quark/3 and Quark/4
- Edited by: Samuel R. Delany and Marilyn Hacker
- Illustrator: Stephen Gilden, Russell FitzGerald
- Country: United States
- Language: English
- Genre: Science fiction Short stories
- Publisher: Paperback Library
- Published: 1970-1971
- Media type: Print

Quark/ was an American anthology book series devoted to avant-garde science fiction and related material, edited by writer and critic Samuel R. Delany and poet and editor Marilyn Hacker; four volumes were published in 1970 and 1971.

== Quark/1 ==
Cover from the first edition

The first volume of Quark/ was published in 1970 through the Paperback Library and featured the following:

- Editorial, by Samuel R. Delany & Marilyn Hacker
- "The Cliff Climbers", by R. A. Lafferty
- "The Sound of Muzak", by Gardner R. Dozois
- "A Trip to the Head", by Ursula K. Le Guin
- "Let Us Quickly Hasten to the Gate of Ivory", by Thomas M. Disch
- "Inalienable Rite", by Gregory Benford
- "Orion", by George Stanley
- "The View from This Window", by Joanna Russ
- "Gone Are the Lupo", by H. B. Hickey
- "Fire Storm", by Christopher Priest
- "Getting to Know You", by Link
- "Dogman of Islington", by Hilary Bailey
- "Shades", by Sandy Boucher
- Twelve Ancillary Approximations for the Quark/ Cover Called Appomattox, by Russell FitzGerald
- "Carthing", by A. E. van Vogt
- "Daughter of Roses", by Helen Adam
- "Adrift on the Freeway", by Edward Bryant
- "My Father’s Guest", by Joan Bernott
- Critical Methods: Speculative Fiction, by Samuel R. Delany
- "Ramona, Come Softly", by Gordon Eklund
- Six Drawings, by Stephen Gilden
- Contributors’ Notes

== Quark/2 ==
Cover from the second edition

The second volume of Quark/ was published in 1971 through the Paperback Library and featured the following:

- Introduction, by Samuel R. Delany & Marilyn Hacker
- "The Interstate", by John Sladek
- "A Possible Episode in the Picaresque Adventures of Mr. J.H.B. Monstrosee", by Carol Emshwiller
- "Trojak", by Marek Obtulowicz
- "Gold, Black, and Silver", by Fritz Leiber
- "Mensuration", by James Sallis
- Six Drawings, by Roger Penney
- "The Voice of the Sonar in My Vermiform Appendix", by Philip José Farmer
- "The Way Home", by Joan Bernott
- "Among the Dead", by Edward Bryant
- "The Last Supper", by Russell FitzGerald
- "The Village", by Leland Stoney
- "Arpad", by Alexei Panshin
- "Bitching It", by Sonya Dorman
- Five Drawings, by Nemi Frost
- "Et in Arcadia Ego", by Thomas M. Disch
- "Landscape for Insurrection", by Marilyn Hacker
- "The People of Prashad", by James Keilty
- "The Inception of the Epoch of Mrs. Bedonebyasyoudid", by John Brunner
- "The Electric Neon Mermaid", by Laurence Yep

== Quark/3 ==
Cover from the third edition

The third volume of Quark/ was published in 1971 through the Paperback Library and featured the following:

- Continuous Landscape, by Donald Simpson
- Foreword, by Samuel R. Delany & Marilyn Hacker
- Continuous Landscape, by Donald Simpson
- "Encased in Ancient Rind", by R. A. Lafferty
- "Home Again, Home Again", by Gordon Eklund
- Continuous Landscape, by Donald Simpson
- "Dog in a Fisherman’s Net", by Samuel R. Delany
- Six Drawings, by Robert Lavigne
- "The Zanzibar Cat", by Joanna Russ
- "Field", by James Sallis
- "Vanishing Points", by Sonya Dorman
- "Where Have You Been, Billy Boy, Billy Boy?", by Kate Wilhelm
- "Brave Salt", by Richard Hill
- "Nature Boy", by Josephine Saxton
- Continuous Landscape, by Donald Simpson
- "Balls: A Meditation at the Graveside", by Virginia Kidd
- "Ring of Pain", by M. John Harrison
- "To the Child Whose Birth Will Change the Way the Universe Works", by George Stanley
- Continuous Landscape, by Donald Simpson
- "A Sexual Song", by Tom Veitch
- "Twenty-Four Letters from Under the Earth", by Hilary Bailey
- Six More Drawings, by Robert Lavigne
- "The Coded Sun Game", by Brian Vickers
- Continuous Landscape, by Donald Simpson
- Contributors’ Notes

== Quark/4 ==
Cover from the fourth edition

The fourth volume of Quark/ was published in 1971 through the Paperback Library and featured the following:

- On Speculative Fiction, by Samuel R. Delany & Marilyn Hacker
- "Basileikon: Summe", by Avram Davidson
- "Voortrekker", by Michael Moorcock
- "Brass and Gold, or Horse and Zeppelin in Beverly Hills", by Philip José Farmer
- "The Song of Passing", by Marco Cacchioni
- "Norman Vs. America", by Charles Platt
- "The True Reason for the Dreadful Death of Mr. Rex Arundel", by Helen Adam
- "Acid Soap Opera", by Gail Madonia
- "Bodies", by Thomas M. Disch
- "Nightsong", by Marilyn Hacker
- "Cages", by Vonda N. McIntyre
- "Man of Letters", by Marek Obtulowicz
- "The Fourth Profession", by Larry Niven
- Twelve Drawings, by Olivier Olivier
- from The Day, by Stan Persky
