= Women of Wonder: The Contemporary Years =

- Women of Wonder: The Contemporary Years cover
- Author: Pamela Sargent
- Language: English
- Series: Women of Wonder series
- Genre: Science fiction
- Publisher: Harcourt Brace
- Publication date: 1995
- Media type: Print (Paperback)
- Pages: 420 pp
- ISBN: 978-0-15-600033-8

Women of Wonder, the Contemporary Years: Science Fiction by Women from the 1970s to the 1990s is an anthology of short stories, novelettes, and novellas edited by Pamela Sargent. It was published in 1995, along a companion volume, Women of Wonder, The Classic Years: Science Fiction by Women from the 1940s to the 1970s.

The collection presents twenty-one works by female science fiction authors written from 1978 to 1993, after the publication of the 1970s anthology series Women of Wonder, More Women of Wonder, and The New Women of Wonder.

The Women of Wonder anthologies were one of the first science fiction collections to focus on women in science fiction both as authors and as varied and complex characters.

== Contents ==
- "Introduction: Women of Wonder, The Contemporary Years" - Pamela Sargent
- "Cassandra" (1978) - C. J. Cherryh
- "The Thaw" (1979) - Tanith Lee
- "Scorched Supper on New Niger" (1980) - Suzy McKee Charnas
- "Abominable" (1980) - Carol Emshwiller
- "Bluewater Dreams" (1981) - Sydney J. Van Scyoc
- "The Cabinet of Edgar Allan Poe" (1982) - Angela Carter
- "The Harvest of Wolves" (1983) - Mary Gentle
- "Bloodchild" - (1984) - Octavia E. Butler
- "Fears" - (1984) - Pamela Sargent
- "Webrider" (1985) - Jayge Carr
- "Alexia and Graham Bell" (1987) - Rosaleen Love
- "Reichs-Peace" (1986) - Sheila Finch
- "Angel" (1987) - Pat Cadigan
- "Rachel in Love" (1987) - Pat Murphy
- "Game Night at the Fox and Goose" (1989) - Karen Joy Fowler
- "Tiny Tango" (1989) - Judith Moffett
- "At the Rialto" (1989) - Connie Willis
- "Midnight News" (1990) - Lisa Goldstein
- "And Wild for to Hold" (1991) - Nancy Kress
- "Immaculate" (1991) - Storm Constantine
- "Farming in Virginia" (1993) - Rebecca Ore
- About the Authors : Women of Wonder, the Contemporary Years
- About the Editor
- Recommended Reading: Science Fiction by Women, 1979 - 1993

== Reception ==
The socio-historical context surrounding the publication of The Contemporary Years and The Classic Years can be ascertained from the concluding comment by the reviewer from Publishers Weekly: "[i]t's important to point out that one doesn't need to be a woman to enjoy these books--they should be essential reading for any serious SF fan."

Meanwhile, Kirkus Reviews summed the work of both volumes as "[t]op-notch tales, splendidly illuminated by Sargent's pointed and informative introductions" and reviewer Sally Estes extoled the editorial work of Pamela Sargent:

What makes the two volumes so fine is not only their sheer variety of stories, writing styles, and themes, but also Sargent's perceptive introduction to each anthology (together, these essays provide a canny overview of women in science fiction) and each book's extensive lists of novels, collections, anthologies, and short fiction for further reading. A veritable feast for sf fans.
