= The New Women of Wonder =

Science Fiction Stories by Women About Women

- The New Women of Wonder cover
- Author: Pamela Sargent
- Language: English
- Series: Women of Wonder series
- Genre: Science fiction
- Publisher: Vintage Books
- Publication date: 1978
- Media type: Print (Paperback)
- Pages: 363 pp
- ISBN: 978-0-394-71876-7
- Followed by: Women of Wonder: The Classic Years

The New Women of Wonder: Recent Science Fiction Stories by Women About Women is an anthology of short stories, novelettes, novellas, and a poem edited by Pamela Sargent. The collection reprinted work by contemporary female science fiction authors, originally published from 1967 to 1977. It was published in 1978.

The New Women of Wonder is the third anthology in a series of three volumes published in the 1970s, preceded by Women of Wonder (1975), and More Women of Wonder (1976). These volumes are considered one of the first science fiction collections to focus on women in science fiction both as authors and as varied and complex characters. Sargent's introductions to the anthologies, in particular, are seen to have offered "comprehensive and informed analyses of the images and role of women in sf."

== Contents ==
- "Introduction: The New Women of Wonder" - Pamela Sargent
- "View from the Moon Station" (poem) (1977) - Sonya Dorman
- "Screwtop" (1976) - Vonda N. McIntyre
- "The Warlord of Saturn's Moons" (1974) - Eleanor Arnason
- "The Triumphant Head" (1970) - Josephine Saxton
- "The Heat Death of the Universe" (1967) - Pamela Zoline
- "Songs of War" (1974) - Kit Reed
- "The Women Men Don't See" (1973) - James Tiptree, Jr.
- "Debut" (1970) - Carol Emshwiller
- "When It Changed" (1972) - Joanna Russ
- "Dead in Irons" (1976) - Chelsea Quinn Yarbro
- "Building Block" (1975) - Sonya Dorman
- "Eyes of Amber" (1977) - Joan D. Vinge

== Reception ==
A contemporary reviewer noted that just Sargent's introduction to the collection was "well worth the price of the book," as it is "packed with information about women writers and women characters in the sci fi field."
