= Emshwiller =

Emshwiller is a surname. Notable people with the surname include:

- Carol Emshwiller (1921–2019), American writer
- Ed Emshwiller (1925–1990), American illustrator
- John R. Emshwiller, American journalist
- Peter Emshwiller, American writer, artist, magazine editor, filmmaker, and actor
