= Nebula Award Stories Two =

1967 anthology edited by Brian W. Aldiss and Harry Harrison

- First edition (US) (artists: Donald Crews and Ann Crews
- Editors: Brian W. Aldiss and Harry Harrison
- Language: English
- Series: Nebula Award Stories
- Genre: Science fiction
- Publisher: Doubleday (US); Gollancz (UK)
- Publication date: 1967
- Publication place: United States
- Media type: Print (hardcover)
- Pages: 255
- Preceded by: Nebula Award Stories 1965
- Followed by: Nebula Award Stories 3

Nebula Award Stories Two is an anthology of science fiction short stories edited by Brian W. Aldiss and Harry Harrison. It was first published in hardcover by Doubleday in September 1967, with a Science Fiction Book Club edition following in November 1969. The first British edition was published by Gollancz in 1967, under the variant title Nebula Award Stories 1967. Paperback editions followed from Pocket Books in the U.S. in September 1968 (reprinted in December 1969), and Panther in the U.K. in 1970. The Panther edition bore the variant title Nebula Award Stories 2. The book was more recently reissued by Stealth Press in hardcover in September 2001. It has also been published in German.

== Summary ==
The book collects pieces published in 1966 that won, were nominated for or made the first ballot of the Nebula Awards for novella, novelette and short story for the year 1967, together with an introduction and afterword by the editors. Not all non-winning pieces nominated for the awards were included.

== Contents ==
- "Introduction" (Brian W. Aldiss and Harry Harrison)
- "The Secret Place" [Best Short Story winner] (Richard McKenna)
- "Light of Other Days" [Best Short Story nominee] (Bob Shaw)
- "Who Needs Insurance?" [Best Novelette, first ballot] (Robin S. Wilson)
- "Among the Hairy Earthmen" [Best Short Story, first ballot] (R. A. Lafferty)
- "The Last Castle" [Best Novella winner] (Jack Vance)
- "Day Million" [Best Short Story, roll of honor] (Frederik Pohl)
- "When I Was Miss Dow" [Best Short Story, first ballot] (Sonya Dorman)
- "Call Him Lord" [Best Novelette winner] (Gordon R. Dickson)
- "In the Imagicon" [Best Short Story, first ballot] (George Henry Smith)
- "We Can Remember It for You Wholesale" [Best Short Story, first ballot] (Philip K. Dick)
- "Man in His Time" [Best Short Story nominee] (Brian W. Aldiss)
- "Afterword: The Year in Science Fiction" (Brian W. Aldiss and Harry Harrison)
- "Nebula Awards 1966 and Roll of Honor"

== Reception ==
Algis Budrys in Galaxy Science Fiction assesses the book as "self-conscious, saddled with primerous blurbs and introductory matter, ... so sophisticated, so scrupulous in crediting even the supplier who manufactures the Science Fiction Writers of America's Nebula Award tokens, that it resembles some kind of grotesque attempt to literatize a corporate statement. Fortunately, it is filled with good stories, or it would have been the most unctuous eulogy in years." He calls the Vance novella "excellent" and the Dickson novelette "good," but does not think much of the short story winner, McKenna's posthumously published "The Secret Place," saying "there is usually a reason why the unpublished stories found in dead men's desks were unpublished, and that reason is very rarely one which justifies this kind of over-reaction. Especially by professionals." He calls the runners-ups by Pohl, Shaw and Dorman "very good," noting that "any one of [them] is technically and conceptually a better and more original story, more economically told." He also calls the stories by Lafferty, Dick, Smith, and Aldiss "good," but Scott's "strikingly plonky," without "the virtue of clear thought." Summing up, Budrys deems the book's contents "not a bad crop, and certainly worth having," but sees "little more logic and reasoned judgment reflected in this selection ... than there is in, for instance, the Hugo popularity poll. For years, we writers sat around vowing that when we had our award, by God, it would be impeccable. It ain't."

The volume was also reviewed in Speculation no. 16, 1967, by Tony Sudbery in Vector 49, 1968, and by Don D'Ammassa in Science Fiction Chronicle no. 214, July 2001.
