= The Penguin Book of Modern Fantasy by Women =

- Author: edited by A. Susan Williams and Richard Glyn Jones
- Cover artist: Leonora Carrington
- Language: English
- Genre: Fantasy, horror
- Publisher: Arbor House
- Publication date: 1995
- Publication place: United States
- Media type: Print (hardback)
- Pages: xiv, 560 pp
- ISBN: 0-670-85907-9
- OCLC: 34886274

The Penguin Book of Modern Fantasy by Women is a reprint anthology of stories edited by A. Susan Williams and Richard Glyn Jones. It was published by Viking Press in May 1995. The anthology contains a wide number of stories by female authors throughout the 20th century, beginning with "The Demon Lover" (1941), and the stories are arranged chronologically. The anthology itself won the 1996 World Fantasy Award for Best Anthology.

== Contents ==
- Sources and Acknowledgements (The Penguin Book of Modern Fantasy By Women), by uncredited
- Introduction (The Penguin Book of Modern Fantasy By Women), by Joanna Russ
- Editors' Note (The Penguin Book of Modern Fantasy By Women), by Richard Glyn Jones and A. Susan Williams
- "The Demon Lover", by Elizabeth Bowen
- "The Tooth", by Shirley Jackson
- "The Lake of the Gone Forever", by Leigh Brackett
- "The Old Man", by Daphne du Maurier
- "My Flannel Knickers", by Leonora Carrington
- "The Anything Box", by Zenna Henderson
- "Miss Pinkerton's Apocalypse", by Muriel Spark
- "A Bright Green Field", by Anna Kavan
- "The Ship Who Sang", by Anne McCaffrey
- "Marmalade Wine", by Joan Aiken
- "The Fall of Frenchy Steiner", by Hilary Bailey
- "Cynosure", by Kit Reed
- "The Wall", by Josephine Saxton
- "The Foot", by Christine Brooke-Rose
- "Baby, You Were Great", by Kate Wilhelm
- "The Second Inquisition", by Joanna Russ
- "Murder, 1986", by P. D. James
- "The Milk of Paradise", by James Tiptree, Jr.
- "When it Happens", by Margaret Atwood
- "Angel, All Innocence", by Fay Weldon
- "Night-Side", by Joyce Carol Oates
- "Fireflood", by Vonda N. McIntyre
- "Wives", by Lisa Tuttle
- "Red as Blood", by Tanith Lee
- "Sur", by Ursula K. Le Guin
- "Peter and the Wolf", by Angela Carter
- "The Pits Beneath the World", by Mary Gentle
- "Two Sheep", by Janet Frame
- "Relics", by Zoe Fairbairns
- "The Evening and the Morning and the Night", by Octavia E. Butler
- "(Learning About) Machine Sex", by Candas Jane Dorsey
- "Prodigal Pudding", by Suniti Namjoshi
- "Boobs", by Suzy McKee Charnas
- "If the Word Was to the Wise", by Carol Emshwiller
- "Trial by Teaspoon", by Lynda Rajan
- "In the Green Shade of a Bee-Loud Glade", by L. A. Hall
- "Death in the Egg", by Ann Oakley
- "Kay and Phil", by Lucy Sussex
- "Notes on the Authors (The Penguin Book of Modern Fantasy By Women), by uncredited

== Reprints ==
- Penguin Books, August 1996.
