= Again, Dangerous Visions =

Science fiction short story anthology edited by Harlan Ellison

- First edition, limited.
- Editor: Harlan Ellison
- Illustrator: Ed Emshwiller, interior
- Cover artist: Ed Emshwiller
- Language: English
- Series: Dangerous Visions
- Genre: Science fiction
- Publisher: Doubleday
- Publication date: March 17, 1972
- Publication place: United States
- Media type: Print (Hardcover)
- Pages: 760
- ISBN: 0385079532
- OCLC: 308501
- Dewey Decimal: 823.0876
- LC Class: PZ1.E473 Ag PS648.S3
- Preceded by: Dangerous Visions
- Followed by: The Last Dangerous Visions

Again, Dangerous Visions (1972) is a science fiction short story anthology, edited by American author Harlan Ellison. It is the follow-up to Dangerous Visions (1967), also edited by Ellison. Cover art and interior illustrations are by Ed Emshwiller.

Like its predecessor, Again, Dangerous Visions, and many of the collected stories, have received awards recognition. "The Word for World is Forest", by Ursula K. Le Guin, won the 1973 Hugo for Best Novella. "When It Changed", by Joanna Russ, won a 1972 Nebula Award for Best Short Story. Harlan Ellison was recognized with a special Hugo Award for anthologizing, his second special award, in 1972. The collection as a whole won the 1973 Locus Award for Best Original Anthology.

Again, Dangerous Visions was released as a two-volume paperback edition by Signet in the United States, and by Pan in the United Kingdom. A sequel was planned, The Last Dangerous Visions, but was never published in Ellison's lifetime. It was then later released in 2024.

The first printing was a hardback edition of 6,500 copies.

== Contents ==
Three writers are each represented by two or three stories with a group title. Each story or group of stories is preceded by an introduction written by Ellison and followed by an afterword written by the author.

- Introduction: "An Assault of New Dreamers", by Harlan Ellison
- "The Counterpoint of View", Keynote Entry by John Heidenry
- "Ching Witch!", by Ross Rocklynne
- "The Word for World Is Forest", by Ursula K. Le Guin (Hugo Award for Best Novella)
- "For Value Received", by Andrew J. Offutt
- "Mathoms From the Time Closet", by Gene Wolfe—comprises "Robot's Story", "Against The Lafayette Escadrille", and "Loco Parentis"
- "Time Travel For Pedestrians", by Ray Nelson
- "Christ, Old Student in a New School", poem by Ray Bradbury
- "King of the Hill", by Chad Oliver
- "The 10:00 Report is Brought to You By...", by Edward Bryant
- "The Funeral", by Kate Wilhelm
- "Harry the Hare", by James B. Hemesath
- "When It Changed", by Joanna Russ (Nebula Award for Best Short Story)
- "The Big Space Fuck", by Kurt Vonnegut
- "Bounty", by T. L. Sherred
- "Still-Life", by Barry N. Malzberg (as K. M. O'Donnell)
- "Stoned Counsel", by H. H. Hollis
- "Monitored Dreams and Strategic Cremations", by Bernard Wolfe—comprises "The Bisquit Position" and "The Girl With Rapid Eye Movements"
- "With A Finger in My I", by David Gerrold
- "In the Barn", by Piers Anthony
- "Soundless Evening", by Lee Hoffman
- [A spot], by Gahan Wilson
- "The Test-Tube Creature, Afterward", by Joan Bernott
- "And the Sea Like Mirrors", by Gregory Benford
- "Bed Sheets Are White", by Evelyn Lief
- "Tissue", by James Sallis—comprises "At the Fitting Shop" and "53rd American Dream"
- "Elouise And The Doctors of the Planet Pergamon", by Josephine Saxton
- "Chuck Berry, Won't You Please Come Home", by Ken McCullough
- "Epiphany For Aliens", by David Kerr
- "Eye of the Beholder", by Burt K. Filer
- "Moth Race", by Richard Hill
- "In Re Glover", by Leonard Tushnet
- "Zero Gee", by Ben Bova
- "A Mouse in the Walls of the Global Village", by Dean R. Koontz
- "Getting Along", by James Blish and Judith Ann Lawrence
- "Totenbüch", by Albert Parra, as A. Parra (y Figueredo).
- "Things Lost", by Thomas M. Disch
- "With the Bentfin Boomer Boys on Little Old New Alabama", novella by Richard A. Lupoff
- "Lamia Mutable", by M John Harrison
- "Last Train to Kankakee", by Robin Scott
- "Empire of the Sun", by Andrew Weiner
- "Ozymandias", by Terry Carr
- "The Milk of Paradise", by James Tiptree, Jr
