= More Women of Wonder =

Anthology

- First edition
- Author: Pamela Sargent
- Cover artist: Charles Shields
- Language: English
- Series: Women of Wonder series
- Genre: Science fiction
- Publisher: Vintage Books
- Publication date: 1976
- Media type: Print (Paperback)
- Pages: 309 pp
- ISBN: 978-0-394-71876-7
- Followed by: The New Women of Wonder

More Women of Wonder: Science Fiction Novelettes by Women About Women is an anthology of five novelettes and two short stories edited by Pamela Sargent. It was published in 1976. The collection reprints work by female science fiction authors originally published from 1935 to 1974, arranged in chronological order.

More Women of Wonder was the second anthology in a series of three volumes published in the 1970s, preceded by Women of Wonder (1975), and followed by The New Women of Wonder (1978). These volumes are considered one of the first science fiction collections to focus on women in science fiction both as authors and as varied and complex characters. Sargent's introductions to the anthologies, in particular, are seen to have offered "comprehensive and informed analyses of the images and role of women in sf."

== Contents ==
- "Introduction: More Women of Wonder" - Pamela Sargent
- "Jirel Meets Magic" (1935) - C. L. Moore
- "The Lake of the Gone Forever" (1949) - Leigh Brackett
- "The Second Inquisition" (1970) - Joanna Russ
- "The Power of Time" (1971) - Josephine Saxton
- "The Funeral" (1972) - Kate Wilhelm
- "Tin Soldier" (1974) - Joan D. Vinge
- "The Day Before the Revolution" (1974) - Ursula K. Le Guin
- Further Reading (More Women of Wonder) - Pamela Sargent
- About the Authors (More Women of Wonder) - Pamela Sargent

== Reception ==
A contemporary reviewer judged the volume "intelligent, [and] thought-provoking," noting that it would "appeal to any and all science fiction fans and especially to readers who are tired of women portrayed as victims of BEMs (bug eyed monsters)." A review in Publishers Weekly praised the stories of Saxton, Russ, and Vinge in particular, calling them "top-notch" and writing that they combined "SF themes and techniques with real emotional power". The review was more equivocal but still positive about the other stories. It expressed surprise at the inclusion of "Jirel Meets Magic" by Moore and "The Lake of the Gone Forever" by Brackett, writing that the former was a fantasy and the latter's women characters were incidental. The review suggested that the book would "start more arguments than it settles about what "women's science fiction" is".
