= The Day Before the Revolution =

- Short story by Ursula K. Le Guin
- Cover art for 2019 reprint
- Country: United States
- Language: English
- Genre: Science fiction

Publication
- Published in: Galaxy
- Publication type: Magazine
- Media type: Print
- Publication date: August 1974
- Series: Hainish Cycle

"The Day Before the Revolution" is a science fiction short story by American writer Ursula K. Le Guin. First published in the science fiction magazine Galaxy in August 1974, it was anthologized in Le Guin's 1975 collection The Wind's Twelve Quarters and in several subsequent collections. Set in Le Guin's fictional Hainish universe, the story has strong connections to her novel The Dispossessed (also published in 1974), and is sometimes referred to as a prologue to the longer work, though it was written later.

"The Day Before the Revolution" follows Odo, an aging anarchist revolutionary, who lives in a commune founded on her teachings. Over the course of a day, she relives memories of her life as an activist while she learns of a revolution in a neighboring country and gets caught up in plans for a general strike the next day. The strike is implied to be the beginning of the revolution that leads to the establishment of the idealized anarchist society based on Odo's teachings that is depicted in The Dispossessed.

Death, grief, and sexuality in older age are major themes explored in "The Day Before the Revolution". The story won the Nebula and Locus awards for Best Short Story in 1975, and was also nominated for a Hugo Award. It had a positive critical reception, with particular praise for its characterization of Odo: a review in Extrapolation called the story a "brilliant character sketch of a proud, strong woman hobbled by old age". Multiple scholars commented that it represented a tonal and thematic shift in Le Guin's writing and toward non-linear narrative structures and works infused with feminism.

== Background and setting ==
Odonianism is anarchism. Not the bomb-in-the-pocket stuff, which is terrorism, whatever name it tries to dignify itself with; not the social-Darwinist economic "libertarianism" of the far right; but anarchism, as prefigured in early Taoist thought, and expounded by Shelley and Kropotkin, Goldman and Goodman. Anarchism's principal target is the authoritarian State (capitalist or socialist); its principal moral-practical theme is cooperation (solidarity, mutual aid).

— Ursula K. Le Guin, foreword to "The Day Before the Revolution" in The Wind's Twelve Quarters (1975).

"The Day Before the Revolution" takes place in Le Guin's fictional Hainish universe, in which human beings did not evolve on Earth, but on the planet Hain. The people of Hain colonized many neighboring planetary systems, possibly a million years before the setting of the story. "The Day Before the Revolution" is set on the fictional planet of Urras, which possesses a habitable moon, Anarres. It depicts the last day in the life of Laia Asieo Odo, a revolutionary figure, shortly before the revolution she helped inspire sweeps through her society. "The Day Before the Revolution" was written soon after The Dispossessed (1974); it is described as a prologue to that novel, which is set in the same planetary system. The idealized anarchist society depicted in The Dispossessed is based on Odo's teachings, and is a stateless, scientific, and largely anti-authoritarian society. Odo's theory is put into practice after the revolution she inspired, with the colonization of the moon Anarres and the establishment of a society without private property. In The Dispossessed, she is usually referred to as the historical figure Odo, but in this story, told from her point of view, she is called Laia. In her preface to "The Day Before the Revolution", Le Guin described the philosophy of Odo as anarchism, and dedicated the story to anarchist theorist Paul Goodman.

== Plot summary ==
The protagonist, Laia, is introduced dreaming of her younger self and her then-lover at a political meeting. When she wakes, she is shown to be an elderly woman, who has had a stroke. Her husband is long dead, her days as a political prisoner are in the past and her major anarchist treatises were written many years ago. She lives in the nation of A-Io in an "Odonian House", a building or commune in which her anarchist principles are followed. Laia goes through her daily routine, attempting to dictate letters to her secretary and eat meals she does not want. She recognizes that some of the status and honor she is accorded by her fellow anarchists is not in keeping with her principles or theirs. Her routine is interspersed with recollections of her life as a revolutionary, including the death of one of her parents in an insurrection. She discusses with her housemates a revolt in the nation of Thu, and the secession of a province there; they express excitement at the successful revolution, and their intent to plan an uprising. She is visited by a group of foreign students, and feeling trapped by her obligations she decides to go on a walk afterwards. She sneaks out of the house and ventures into the city, but feels exhausted before she walks far and is found by a housemate. Back in the house, she is asked to speak the next day at a general strike, but says she will not be there, and struggles up the stairs toward her room.

== Publication and reception ==
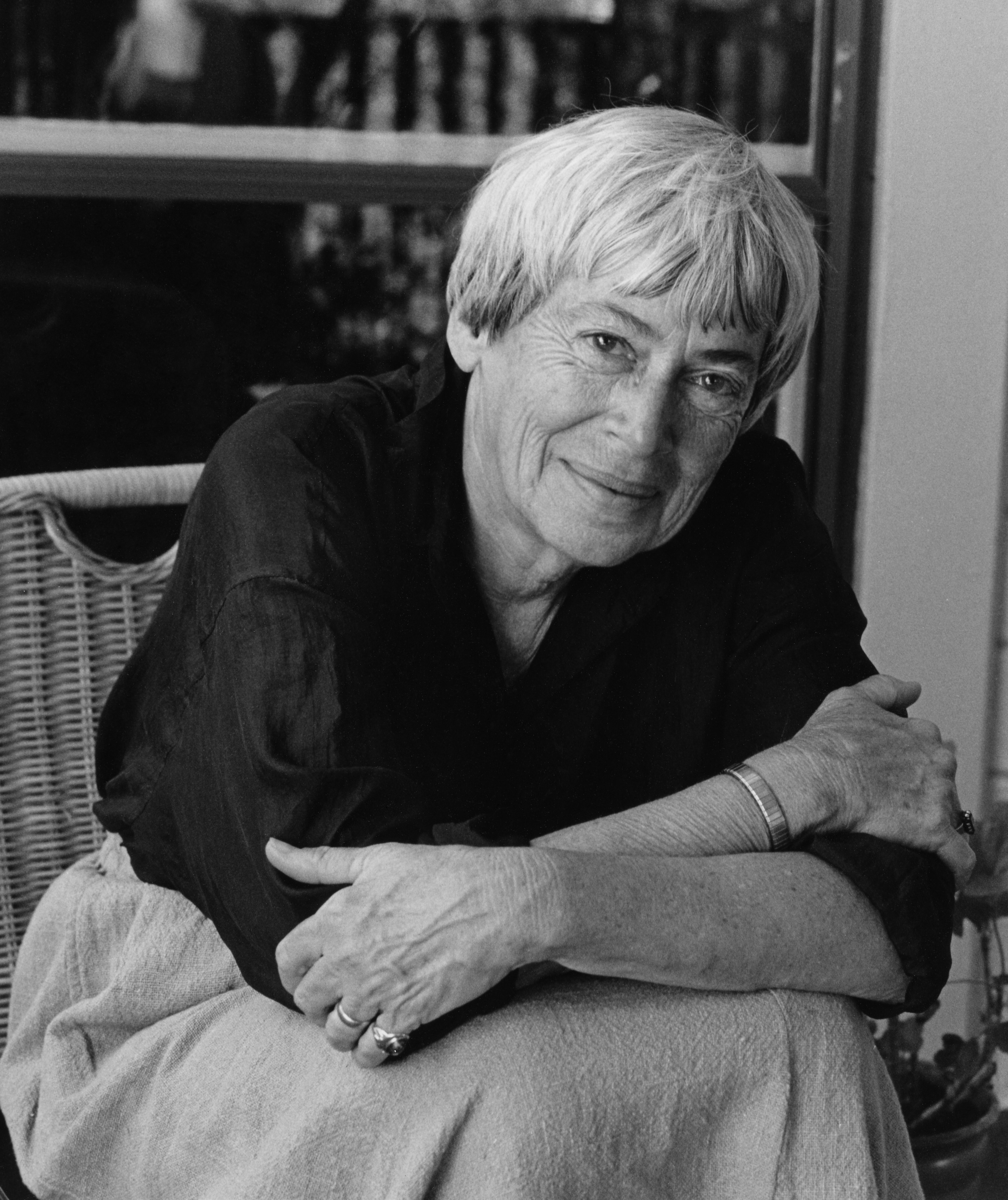
The author Ursula K. Le Guin, pictured in 1995

The story was first published in Galaxy in August 1974, and collected in Le Guin's short fiction collection The Wind's Twelve Quarters in 1975. It has been anthologized several times, including in Nebula Award Stories 10 (1975), and in the second volume of Pamela Sargent's Women of Wonder series, More Women of Wonder (1976). It has been described as one of Le Guin's most famous short stories, as well as one of the most frequently analyzed. "The Day Before the Revolution" won the Nebula Award for Best Short Story, the Locus Award for best short story, and the Jupiter Award for short stories, all in 1975. It was also nominated for the 1975 Hugo Award for Best Short Story. The Dispossessed won the Hugo and Nebula awards for best novel in the same year.

"The Day Before the Revolution" was critically well received, with multiple reviewers describing it as among Le Guin's best works. Publishers Weekly, in a review of Nebula Award Stories 10, called it Le Guin's best short story, though a review of More Women of Wonder in the same publication did not consider it one of the volume's strongest pieces. A review of The Wind's Twelve Quarters in Locus listed "The Day Before the Revolution" among the weaker stories in the volume, writing that Le Guin's choice to introduce it as the "story of one of the ones who walked away from Omelas" (in reference to a different story in the same collection) heightened its "didactic element" and reduced the meaning in Odo's life. Conversely, Jo Walton, writing in Tor, called it the best of the "very very good set" in that collection. Algis Budrys, reviewing More Women of Wonder in Fantasy and Science Fiction, considered the stories to be of "uncommon excellence", and called "The Day Before the Revolution" the "best Le Guin short I have ever read". A review of the same collection in Galaxy described the story as a "gem ... writing at its best, beautiful and deeply moving".

Multiple commentators considered "The Day Before the Revolution" a landmark for Le Guin's writing. Literary scholar Richard Erlich wrote that Odo represents a turning point for Le Guin toward works infused with feminism. According to Walton, writing in 2017, Odo as a complex and fully realized elderly woman was a character rare in contemporary science fiction, and even more so when "The Day Before the Revolution" was first published. Scholar Donna White wrote that Odo was Le Guin's most successful female protagonist until the publication of The Eye of the Heron in 1978. White notes that the story resembles contemporary realistic fiction more than science fiction, arguing that it represents, along with The Dispossessed, part of a tonal shift in Le Guin's writing away from "romantic quests". Literary scholar Jim Jose notes that although Odo is an important philosophical figure in The Dispossessed, "The Day Before the Revolution" provides neither philosophical nor historical exposition, instead centering Odo as a character. Jose thus sees the short story as an early example of a shift toward non-linear narrative structures in Le Guin's writing, particularly her writing exploring utopian ideas, a trend culminating in her 1985 novel Always Coming Home.

=== Characterization and style ===
"The Day Before the Revolution" has been described as a character study to which the science fiction setting is incidental, although for Walton, the alien society with a complex imagined history as the setting for a character study was what set the story apart. Le Guin's characterization of her protagonist received particular praise. In a positive review of The Wind's Twelve Quarters, The Sydney Morning Herald termed the story a "brilliant piece of characterisation", and the St. Louis Post-Dispatch similarly praised the depiction of Odo. Literary scholar Darren Harris-Fain called it a "moving depiction" of Odo, and said that the thorough character development in "The Day Before the Revolution" demonstrated the literary worth of science fiction. Scholar Joe de Bolt described it as an "exquisitely beautiful piece of polemical art", and opined that labelling the story science fiction denied it the "wider recognition it deserves".

Literary scholar Charlotte Spivack noted that Le Guin's science fiction often subverts stereotypes of elderly characters, and offered Odo as an example, praising Le Guin's "sensitive characterization". A positive review in Tor also praised the story's depiction of the "revolutionary icon as a curmudgeonly old woman". Science fiction critic George Slusser found it "harshly realistic" in its focus on death and old age. Carl Yoke said in Extrapolation that Le Guin had written a "brilliant character sketch of a proud, strong woman hobbled by old age", and added that it was Le Guin's depiction of the psychological effects of aging that made the characterization strong. Yoke highlighted a passage in which Odo experiences circular and repetitious thoughts, a tendency that Le Guin mirrored in the prose describing it. Yoke concluded that Le Guin had elevated The Day Before the Revolution to a higher artistic level than a typical story.

== Themes ==
The short story explores grief, sexuality in older age, and the experience of aging and death, themes that were largely absent from The Dispossessed, which has a younger protagonist. Odo in her old age is mostly disengaged from the activity and excitement around her, instead often being lost in her memories. She experiences contradictory impulses and feelings, characterized by "dynamic ambivalence" and a "tension of opposites", in the words of Spivack. Though she was the progenitor of the revolutionary theories her housemates now follow, she has feelings of ambivalence towards them, asking "Why the hell [do I] have to be a good Odonian?" According to literary scholar Carter Hanson, Odo wavers between "defiance and resignation, action and inertia". She feels trapped by her role as a figurehead and leader, and seeks to assert her agency by dismissing her secretary and leaving her house, though she recognizes that she has nothing else to do. Spivack similarly opines that Odo derives satisfaction from "being a monument" to her movement, but also resents how she is seen. All her life she has been the center of a political movement, and now she worries she has become peripheral; at the same time, she is reluctant to participate in the tasks she is assigned. Odo has worked for societal change her entire life, including writing books and spending time in prison; she is the "guiding spirit of the revolution". However, when she is asked to speak the next day by her housemates, she replies that she "won't be here tomorrow", foreshadowing her death that doesn't allow her to witness the revolution she was responsible for.

Le Guin uses vivid imagery to convey the experience of being elderly, such as when, on waking, Odo examines her aged feet and struggles with the deterioration her body has experienced as the result of a stroke. Her activities are interspersed with recollections of her past: according to Hanson, Odo's memory drives the narrative of the short story. Focusing on Odo's old age, rather than her period as an active revolutionary, Le Guin examines the essential motivations people experience besides idealism, according to Slusser. Odo acknowledges to herself that she has been motivated by sex and vanity, and also the happiness she had and then lost. In scholar Jane Donawerth's view, Le Guin uses Odo's aging to examine her makeup as a revolutionary. Various elements of her life are undone over time, as her physical deterioration prevents her from working and her lover's death destroys her love life. Close to death, Odo returns to the freedom of a child, and sees that same freedom in the daughters of the house she lives in. According to Donawerth, Le Guin suggests that for Odo's revolution to succeed, it must already have succeeded in creating "lovely, unconstrained daughters" who can see it through. Donawerth also argues that Odo's outlook on her last day encapsulates endurance, more than the hope or anger she outgrew over her lifetime. Hanson wrote that for those around her, Odo's own memories are "lost and subsumed" within the symbol that the adherents of Odonianism need her to be. For scholar Richard Erlich, Odo symbolizes immanence, as she has drawn her beliefs from her lived experience of a full life.

Spivack analyzes Odo as an example of a dynamic elderly figure in Le Guin's writing, who shares similarities with Wold in Planet of Exile and the middle-aged Ged in The Farthest Shore. While all the characters have aged, they are not stereotypes; limited by their physical bodies, they retain the ability to affect their worlds. Robin Anne Reid lists Odo as an example of "'Bossy' older women" who are effective revolutionaries because they are able to "speak unpalatable truths" without regard for consequence. Reid considers this character type a feminist subversion of the trope of negatively-portrayed outspoken older women. The character Odo is described by Le Guin in her introduction to the story as "one of the ones who walked away from Omelas", a reference to her short story "The Ones Who Walk Away from Omelas", which immediately precedes it in The Wind's Twelve Quarters. For Spivack, Odo exemplifies the titular individuals of "Omelas", who "cannot enjoy a prosperity dependent on the suffering of others". David Porter analyzes "The Day Before the Revolution" among other works by Le Guin from the same period, and suggests that a theme common to them is the inevitability of societal change and its impacts on individual people.

== Sources ==
- Cummins, Elizabeth (1990). Understanding Ursula K. Le Guin. University of South Carolina Press. ISBN 978-0-87249-687-3.
- Donawerth, Jane (1997). Frankenstein's Daughters: Women Writing Science Fiction (1st ed.). Syracuse University Press. ISBN 978-0-8156-2686-2.
- Harris-Fain, Darren (2005). Understanding Contemporary American Science Fiction: The Age of Maturity, 1970–2000 (1st ed.). University of South Carolina Press. ISBN 978-1-57003-585-2.
- Le Guin, Ursula K. (2017) [1975]. The Wind's Twelve Quarters. HarperCollins. pp. 285–304. ISBN 978-0-06-247103-1.
- Slusser, George E. (1976). The Farthest Shores of Ursula K. Le Guin. Borgo Press. ISBN 978-0-89370-205-2.
- Spivack, Charlotte (1984). Ursula K. Le Guin. Twayne Publishers. ISBN 0-8057-7393-2.
- White, Donna (1999). Dancing with Dragons: Ursula K. Le Guin and the Critics. Camden House. ISBN 978-1-57113-034-1.
