= Women of Wonder =

- Women of Wonder first edition cover
- Author: Pamela Sargent
- Language: English
- Series: Women of Wonder series
- Genre: Science fiction
- Publisher: Vintage Books
- Publication date: 1975
- Media type: Print (Paperback)
- Pages: 285 pp
- ISBN: 978-0-394-71041-9
- Followed by: More Women of Wonder

Women of Wonder: Science-fiction Stories by Women about Women is an anthology of twelve short stories and a poem edited by Pamela Sargent, published in 1975. The collection reprints work by female science fiction authors originally published from 1948 to 1973, arranged in chronological order.

Women of Wonder was the first anthology in a series of three, followed by More Women of Wonder (1976), and The New Women of Wonder (1978). These volumes are considered key texts in the consciousness raising of the science fiction community during the 1970s, as their assemblage gave a sense of the history of female science fiction writing while helping reclaim early writers. Sargent's introductions to the anthologies, in particular, are seen to have offered "comprehensive and informed analyses of the images and role of women in sf."

Sargent revisited these anthologies in 1995 in the revised volume Women of Wonder, The Classic Years: Science Fiction by Women from the 1940s to the 1970s and its companion volume, Women of Wonder, the Contemporary Years: Science Fiction by Women from the 1970s to the 1990s.

== Contents ==
- "Introduction: Women in Science Fiction" – Pamela Sargent

In this essay, Sargent provides a short history of women in science fiction up to 1974. She discusses some of the earlier prominent women writers, from Mary Shelley to C. L. Moore, then looks at how women characters have been ignored or stereotyped by writers like Jules Verne, H. G. Wells, Isaac Asimov, and Robert Heinlein. She closes by saying that changes will likely happen in the genre if readers show they want different perspectives, which will then make publishers interested in new ideas.
The introduction includes, as James Nicoll notes, "a fascinating multipage footnote that documents a discussion between [Ursula K.] Le Guin and Stanislaw Lem about [Lem's perception of the Gethenians as masculine in] The Left Hand of Darkness."

- "The Child Dreams" (poem) – Sonya Dorman
- "That Only a Mother" – Judith Merril
- "Contagion" – Katherine MacLean
- "The Wind People" – Marion Zimmer Bradley
- "The Ship Who Sang" – Anne McCaffrey
- "When I Was Miss Dow" – Sonya Dorman
- "The Food Farm" – Kit Reed
- "Baby, You Were Great" – Kate Wilhelm
- "Sex and/or Mr Morrison" – Carol Emshwiller
- "Vaster Than Empires and More Slow" – Ursula K. Le Guin
- "False Dawn" – Chelsea Quinn Yarbro
- "Nobody’s Home" – Joanna Russ
- "Of Mist, and Grass, and Sand" – Vonda N. McIntyre

== Reception ==
In a contemporary review of Women of Wonder and Joanna Russ's The Female Man, Cindy Baron emphasizes the importance of the anthology:

At last, women are beginning to take back a share of science fiction. We comment on our pasts, illuminate the present, and create scenarios for a radical different future....The heroes range from an expectant mother in a post-atomic world, to a cyborg with a woman's personality and a ship for a body, to the head of a multiple family clan. All are recognizable as real, women's visions....One of the exciting things about this collection is its range. The stories deal with all facets of present-day women's existence.

Writing in 2020 for the 20th anniversary of the feminist academic journal Femspec, Lisa Yaszek summed up the role Women of Wonder played in feminist science fiction criticism:

Feminist science fiction scholarship proper exploded in the 1970s, when anthologies such as Pamela Sargent's Women of Wonder (1974) and Virginia Kidd's Millennial Women (1978) first introduced readers to the vitality and diversity of women's SF and scholarly works by Susan Wood, Marleen Barr, and Joanna Russ took on the task of thinking through the image of women in science fiction.
