= The Shore of Women =

1986 novel by Pamela Sargent

- Author: Pamela Sargent
- Language: English
- Genre: Science Fiction; Feminist fiction; Dystopian fiction
- Published: 1986 (Crown Publishers)
- Publication place: United States
- ISBN: 978-0-517-55834-8

The Shore of Women is a 1986 feminist science fiction novel by American author Pamela Sargent. The story follows the points of view of Laissa and Arvil in the first part, titled "The Enclave". It follows Birana and Arvil in the second part, "The Refuge". The final part, called "The Shrine", is again narrated by Laissa.

== Synopsis ==
Thousands of years after a devastating nuclear war, men are the outcasts, rejected by the women they once oppressed. They live outside the city walls, bereft of the bounty of the women's non-violent civilization. They live in small bands, scavenging and hunting, killing and bonding. They know nothing of real women, but worship the image of women through The Lady, a goddess who rewards them with erotic dreams when they lie on a couch in her temple, and ensures the continuation of the race of man by sending boy-children out of the cities. This belief is reinforced through a virtual reality system controlled by the women. While the men are immersed in these visions, their semen is collected for purposes of procreation.

The women live peaceful lives, though they must keep an eye on the men, ensuring they do not create large, permanent settlements, or advance technologically—after all, they nearly destroyed everything and cannot be trusted.

Laissa is a young woman who begins to question the tenets of her society, after she sees a woman and her daughter banished for murder, presumably headed to their deaths. She is also dealing with her own mother, who is reluctant to give up her male child. Laissa is a member of the upper-class "Mothers of the City", the intellectual and political leaders who ensure that their way of life continues, and the only women permitted to have male children. Her girlfriend leaves her, because her questioning the system makes her "politically undesirable", and so she moves closer to the "normal" women, the artisan and tradeswomen class.

Arvil is Laissa's brother, though neither know it. He lives with a small band of men not far from Laissa's city. One day, men on horses appear at the band's camp and invite them to join their own camp, which is much, much larger. Shortly after Arvil's arrival there, the big camp is destroyed by flying ships from the nearby city. Arvil manages to escape. He encounters Birana, the daughter earlier expelled for not intervening in her mother's crime, and thinks she is an aspect of The Lady, and so helps her. Birana's mother was killed by a band of men, who then fled in fear having murdered an aspect of the goddess. Birana knows that if the women in the city know she is alive, they will not let her live, because she could reveal their true, non-divine nature.

Arvil and Birana travel west, seeking a rumored refuge of women. Their journey is an exploration of gender roles: The two fall in love and Birana becomes pregnant. They stay for a while in an agrarian settlement of men who worship an exiled woman, outside of the jurisdiction of the women's cities. The men become violent because of their jealousy of Arvil, and after he kills the headman, the pair continues their journey. Upon reaching the Pacific, they find a group that includes both men and women, but the men are in charge. Having given birth to a girl, Birana knows she wants more for her child, so she and Arvil head back, intending to hand the child over to the women's city.

Meanwhile, Laissa has been camping outside the city walls, recording the stories of men visiting the shrine. This is where Arvil and Birana meet her, and tell their story. They hand the baby over, and Laissa returns to the city, though as punishment for her rebellion, she is demoted from the elite class, and is forbidden to have children of her own.

== Themes ==
Gender

Unlike some other feminist utopian authors, such as Charlotte Perkins Gilman, Sargent does not view the separation of the sexes (which she views as binary) as utopian in and of itself. Throughout her narrative, she explores various ideas about gender and gender-based power, outlining in each various advantages and disadvantages. Though violence exists in both the men's society and in the women's society, Sargent seems to paint it as endemic to one and occasional to the other. For example, Birana and her mother were cast out of the women's city after the mother tried to kill her partner, whereas the men kill each other all the time. When Birana and Arvil live among the men on the lakeshore, they keep their relationship secret, and nevertheless, the headman's jealousy leads to more killing. Women are portrayed as intellectual and artistic, and they view the men as dirty, stupid and violent—a world view mostly affirmed, except for the characterization of Arvil, who represents the potential for it being otherwise.

Sex and Homosexuality

Procreation is a strictly technical process in the world of the novel. Thus, there are no sexual relations between men and women. The women do have romantic and sexual relationships with each other, this is a given aspect of their society, and they're conditioned to find heterosexuality disgusting. The men have different sexual lives: Though they have relations among themselves, they are always drawn into the erotic idealization of The Lady in her shrines. Birana must overcome her disgust of the very idea of sex with a male, and both of the young people go through serious psychological contortions in coming to realize that their world-views are based on lies.

As the idealization of a "good man", Arvil is monogamous with Birana. He does recount that when witnessing a rape carried out by another man, he felt a sense of arousal, though he fought against it, knowing it was wrong, specifically citing the woman's lack of consent.

Technology

The women's cities have advanced technologies, the most prominent of which in the narrative are the virtual reality system used to control the men, in vitro fertilization, and flying vehicles used to destroy any attempts by the men to advance their civilization. However, their civilization is depicted as somewhat stagnant. The men, on the other hand, live in stone age culture, and are illiterate and brutal. In several references, Sargent indicates that the women no longer have any collective will to achieve technological or scientific advancement, while the men—in their meager way—do attempt to advance their civilization, mostly as a means to achieving greater power and protection. An endeavor that the women quash, using mass extermination if necessary. At several points in the narrative, Laissa and some of the other women speculate that men, and even violence, might be an important part in spurring human progress. At one point, a critic of this society observes,

“our past achievements in the sciences, the most important ones, took place during times when people were building their most powerful weapons. One might almost say that building the weapons brought about other, more constructive discoveries that otherwise wouldn't have taken place…You know, most of the physicists in ancient times, before the Rebirth, were men.”

== Reception ==
The Shore of Women was included in Science Fiction: The 101 Best Novels 1985-2010 by Damien Broderick and Paul Di Filippo.

Publishers Weekly opined that "Some science fiction purists may be surprised by the decidedly erotic nature of this story, but, with her luminous prose and vivid characters, Sargent (Venus of Dreams has written a compelling and emotionally involving novel. In the New York Times review, Gerald Jonas lauded Sargent's treatment of homosexuality in the book, and wrote: “I applaud Ms. Sargent's ambition and admire the way she has unflinchingly pursued the logic of her vision.”
