= Ladyhawke (novel) =

1985 novel by Joan D. Vinge

Ladyhawke is a novel by Joan D. Vinge published in 1985.

== Release ==
Ladyhawke is a novelization of the film Ladyhawke. The novel was published by Signet as a paperback featuring sixteen pages of photos from the film.

Vinge wanted to do the Ladyhawke novelization despite the publisher underbidding on the rights because she had "read the screenplay and it looked like a lot of fun. I told my agent to call around and tell people that I was interested. A different publisher bought it, and their science fiction editor recommended me, so indirectly I got to do it after all. That was one of my favorites; I enjoyed writing that." It took her four to six weeks to write the novelization, and much of the dialog and some of the story was changed from the screenplay into the film.

== Plot summary ==
The Bishop of Aquila is scorned by Lady Isabeau, who is in love with Etienne Navarre, the captain of the Guard. The bishop places a curse on Isabeau and Etienne, whereby Isabeau turns into a hawk at dawn and returns to human form at sunset, while Etienne turns into a wolf at sunset and returns to human form at dawn. The lovers trust the young thief Phillipe to end the spell, and he gets caught up in the schemes of the bishop while trying to help the lovers.

== Reception ==
Stephanie Nettell for The Times Literary Supplement said that "There is an attractive sparkle to Vinge's formula tale, and the fierce action and noble romance between them give an enjoyably high tension to her story of loyalty, courage and magic."

John C. Bunnell for the Statesman Journal said that "Phillipe is a remarkable combination of horror and rogueishness whose constant doubts add life and suspense to the adventure. Those who have already picked up the novelization should now be waiting to see if the film lives up to its promise."

Dave Langford reviewed Ladyhawke for White Dwarf #65, and stated that "Have fun spotting the obligatory film cliches - as when someone's running, hotly pursued, down an empty road; stumbles and falls; finds himself staring at mere inches' range at the boots (here hooves) of a previously unnoticed stranger. . . But Vinge's clear, witty writing makes up for much."

John C. Bunnell reviewed Ladyhawke in Dragon Magazine (September 1985) and said that "Until very recently, novelizations of science-fiction and fantasy films weren't worthy of serious critical attention — largely because the films on which they were based were somewhat thinly conceived. But matters have steadily improved lately, and Joan Vinge's translation of Ladyhawke into book form proves once and for all that the task is worth doing."
