= Joan Bernott =

American author of short science fiction

Joan Bernott is an American author of short science fiction whose work has appeared in the anthologies Again, Dangerous Visions and Cassandra Rising.

== Bibliography ==
Joan Bernott was born Catholic and is best known for works of short fiction which focus on themes surrounding personal relationships and the ways in which fantastic circumstance can illustrate the complexities of everyday situations.

For example, her story "The Test-Tube Creature, Afterward" centers on the relationship of a young scientist and his strained relationship with a "creature" of his own creation. The themes explored include jealousy, responsibility and an examination of different types of love; themes which first appear in "My Father's Guest" and later reappear in "Troll Road".

== Bibliography ==
- "My Father's Guest" (1970) - Quark/1, Paperback Library
- "The Way Home" (1971) - Quark/2, Paperback Library
- "Test-Tube Creature, Afterward, The" (1973) - Again, Dangerous Visions, Doubleday
- "Troll Road" (1978) - Cassandra Rising, Doubleday
