= The Last Castle (novella) =

1966 science fiction novella

- Author: Jack Vance
- Illustrator: Alicia Austin (1980)
- Genre: Science fiction
- Publisher: Galaxy Science Fiction
- Publication date: 1966
- Awards: Hugo Award for Best Novelette (1967); Nebula Award for Best Novella (1967)

The Last Castle is a science fiction novella by American writer Jack Vance published in 1966. It won the 1966 Nebula Award for Best Novella and the 1967 Hugo Award for Best Novelette. It is about a future civilization of wealthy nobles who live in high-tech castles, which are maintained by an enslaved alien race, the Meks. After centuries of slavery, the Meks revolt, destroying the castles and slaughtering their elite inhabitants, until only one castle is left.

== Plot summary ==
In the far future, a small elite group of humans have returned from Altair (over 16 light years away) to Earth, their mother planet, to live in nine elaborate, high-tech castles as idle aristocrats. They are primarily concerned with theoretical discussions of aesthetics, past times and questions of honor and etiquette. Their time is spent drinking fine wines, socializing at formal dinners, and striving to rise in their political standing. Various enslaved alien races provide technicians ("Meks"), transportation ("birds", "power wagons"), household service ("Peasants"), and amusement ("Phanes"). Only a small minority of humans live a free life outside of the castles, and are considered barbaric by the castle inhabitants because they perform manual labor to serve their own needs.

After seven centuries during which the noble humans develop an increasingly refined society, the Meks revolt. The inhabitants of some castles without defenses are immediately killed, while the inhabitants of the best defended castles consider the revolt only a nuisance. Complacently the humans consider their high-tech castles unchallengeable. To take action themselves rather than only planning and commanding is seen as a vulgar loss of dignity. Gentlemen in this society only do intellectual activity; all technical work or labour is seen as beneath them.

However, without the Meks, the technology of the castles cannot be maintained. Furthermore, the Meks use their inside knowledge of the operation of the castles to successfully besiege the remaining castles until only Castle Hagedorn is left. While most castle citizens value their traditions and social customs and standing higher than their own survival, one gentleman however, Xanten, takes it upon himself to research the situation and search for allies outside of the castle. He eventually accepts that he can learn from the "barbaric" free-living outsiders and tribes.

After a short and hard battle, the Meks take over Castle Hagedorn. Xanten and his allies win by destroying the Meks' food supply, which starves the Meks after several months. When the Meks call for terms, Xanten concludes that humanity cannot go on depending on slave labor, so they send the surviving Meks back to their native planet, Etamin 9, and resolve to live off the land and produce their needs by their own labor in the future. Castle Hagedorn becomes a museum to the past ways of life.

== Characters ==
=== Humans ===
==== Named ====
- Xanten: a 35-year-old clan chief with a tall build. He is criticized for a lack of punctilio. His consort is Araminta, but he cannot have a sizeable family with her, as there is a one child-per adult policy (she has a child from a previous partner). He detests O.Z. Garr. He has an amorous encounter with Glys Meadowsweet.
- Claghorn: A late middle-aged gentleman with a strong build, greying hair and green eyes. His academic specialty is studying the Meks. After the Mek revolt starts, he leaves Castle Hagedorn to live in the Expiationist village.
- O.Z. Garr: An elegant-looking traditionalist gentleman notable for his knowledge of military theory and for commanding Meks in a successful battle against the Nomads. As a traditionalist, he wishes to continue the old ways of the castle elites.
- O.C. Charle, formally titled "Hagedorn," a position of significant social but little administrative importance. He is not considered outstanding but neither is he controversial and is elected 'first gentleman of the castle' in a compromise between two more substantive but strongly opposed candidates, Claghorn and O.Z. Garr.
- Philidor: A former noble who became an Expiationist and moved to a village. A man of learning, he was called A.G. Philidor as a gentleman, but in exile, he prefers simply the informal name "Philidor".
- Glys Meadowsweet: A beautiful young woman who lives in the Expiationist village. She is likely the child of a noble couple who could not keep her due to the one-child policy.

==== Categories ====
- Expiationists: Nobles and elites from the castles exiled for their controversial views or political discontent. They include former high-ranking nobles, scholars, low-ranked people and children who could not be kept due to the one child policy. Expiationists feel guilty for the Altarians' original sin of enslaving alien races. They live in humble villages, where they toil with their hands.
- Nomads: Tall and lean semi-barbaric original Earth dwellers who were present when the elites of Altair arrived 700 years ago. The nomads live on the plains in encampments. The Nomads consider the Altairian humans and their alien slaves to be equally strange.

=== Aliens ===
- Meks: Men-like creatures from the planet Etamin Nine with brown, rust-coloured, thick and waxy-looking skin. Spines coming out of their necks and scalps are coated with a conductive copper-chrome metal on the skin surface. Their faces were corrugated muscle with a vertical maw at the bottom. Their brain functions as a radio transceiver to other Meks. They wear no clothes except a work apron or tool belt. In their native planet, they ate the decaying vegetation in the swamp mud, but on Earth they consume a syrup made by humans, and so their original digestive organs, for consuming mud, have atrophied. Their brains have metal oxide-covered silica cells that retain data forever. They do not generally display emotions or personality.
- Peasants: small andromorphs from Spica Ten of limited intellectual capabilities. They work as servants in the castles.
- Power-wagons: Rectangular swamp creatures from Etamin Nine that have a mixture of biological components (muscle, digestive organs, brain, protective pelt) and mechanical elements (wheels, rotors, wires, a lever). They are powerful and docile.
- Birds: garish, multicoloured flying creatures with long necks, they live in the cotes of the castle. They can speak, but much of what they say is jeering and insolent. They are hard to discipline.
- Phanes: Docile, beautiful and playful female creatures from Albireo Seven's moon, they are exhibited by noble Phane-owners for their lovely gauze that grows from their pores. They are selectively bred for their beautiful features. While enthusiasm for showing or commenting on phanes is an approved pastime, gentlemen who fall in love with Phanes are mocked. Human-Phane sexual contact causes Phanes to lose their beauty. Phanes live for twenty years; in the last ten years of a Phane's life, she loses her beauty, and switches to a domestic servant role.

== Setting ==
On Earth, there are nine complex castles for the elite from Altair. Castle Hagedorn has a mile-long, 300-foot high wall. Inside there are 28 noble families which had a five-century lineage on Earth. Underneath the nobles' houses are storerooms, warehouses, workshops, living quarters for Meks, and facilities for baking, brewing, and other related functions.

== Reception ==
When reviewing Nebula Award Stories Two, Algis Budrys called the novella excellent.

In Lawrence Person's 2003 review, he notes that the aristocrats' "...society has rendered them incapable of rational interaction with other [alien] races". Persons states that the protagonist Xanten is "Robert A. Heinlein's classic" character from "Man Who Learned Better". He says "Vance's work has a depth, richness and sophistication that can be enjoyed long after you know how the story ends."

== Awards ==
The Last Castle won the Nebula Award for Best Novella for 1966 and the Hugo Award for Best Novelette in 1967. It was the first Nebula Award and second Hugo Award for the author.
