= The Mount (novel) =

2002 novel by Carol Emshwiller

- Cover of first edition (paperback)
- Author: Carol Emshwiller
- Language: English
- Genre: Science fantasy novel
- Publisher: Small Beer Press
- Publication date: 2002
- Publication place: United States
- Media type: Print (Paperback)
- Pages: 232 pp
- ISBN: 1-931520-03-8
- OCLC: 50289922
- Dewey Decimal: 813/.54 22
- LC Class: PS3555.M54 M68 2002

The Mount is a 2002 science fantasy novel by Carol Emshwiller. It won the Philip K. Dick Award in 2002, and was also nominated for the Nebula Award for Best Novel in 2003.

The author was inspired to write The Mount after she took a class in the psychology of prey animals. After the class, Emshwiller wondered what it would be like if a smart prey animal rode a predator. The idea fascinated her enough to write a short story which became The Mount.

== Plot summary ==
The first-person narrator, Charley, is a young man who, like all humans, is used as a riding mount (e.g. horses) for an alien race known as Hoots. Humans in Charley's world, a pastoral Earth, have existed in a master-slave relationship with the Hoots for centuries. The Hoots, who have no way to return to their home planet, maintain the natural systems that keep the world running. Escaped mounts like Charley's father, formerly the Guards' Mount known as Heron, lead assaults on the stables where humans are kept and seek to unify their own people against the Hoots.

When Charley (mount name Smiley) meets his father for the first time (Heron and Merry Mary were mated and separated by the Hoots soon after Charley was born), he resists betraying either his Master, the Hoot heir apparent, or anything that might help the resisting humans because his life as a mount is the only one he's ever known.

== The Hoots ==
The Hoots are a race that have evolved from prey. They are herbivores who have developed a set of very keen senses which allowed them to tame and use predators as mounts. The need for mounts is due to the fact that Hoots have very weak leg muscles, which prevents them from moving about efficiently. Most Hoots have never developed their leg muscles and use either mounts or small bicycle devices to move about. Hoots have very large and strong hands which were evolved for strangling predators. They also have large eyes and very large ears. The ears are used as a way of expressing emotions. For example, when a Hoot laughs, their ears flap up and down.

== Reception ==
Peter Cannon praised the novel in his review for the magazine Publishers Weekly, saying that it was "Brilliantly conceived and painfully acute in its delineation of the complex relationships between masters and slaves, pets and owners, the served and the serving, this poetic, funny and above all humane novel deserves to be read and cherished as a fundamental fable for our material-minded times." Kirkus Reviews said that "with patience and enormous affection for her four-legged characters, Emshwiller has fashioned an affecting, plausible story that manages to sidestep a heavy-handed symbolism. A deceptively simple, clear-eyed story that should find its sympathetic Gullivers." Michael Hemmingson reviewing for Review of Contemporary Fiction said "it took me about thirty pages to figure out who was narrating the narrative--my one complaint--but the title should have given it away sooner. While a quirky novel, it is very easy to fall into the rhythm of Emshwiller's poetic and smooth sentences and run with the flow."
