= The Summer Queen =

1991 novel by Joan D. Vinge

- First edition cover
- Author: Joan D. Vinge
- Cover artist: Michael Whelan
- Language: English
- Series: The Snow Queen Cycle
- Genre: Science fiction
- Publisher: Warner Books
- Publication date: 1991
- Publication place: United States
- Media type: Print (hardback & paperback)
- Pages: 670 (first edition, hardback)
- ISBN: 978-0446513975
- Dewey Decimal: 813/.54
- Preceded by: Worlds End (1984)
- Followed by: Tangled Up in Blue (2000)

The Summer Queen is a 1991 science fiction novel by American writer Joan D. Vinge, the sequel to The Snow Queen. It was nominated for the 1992 Hugo Award for Best Novel and Locus Award for Best Science Fiction Novel.

Moon Dawntrader, a clone of the former Snow Queen, has become the Summer Queen on the planet of Tiamat. She must now endeavour to introduce technology to the Summers while keeping the mers safe from extinction.

== Plot summary ==
Moon Dawntreader Summer, the Summer Queen of the planet Tiamat, struggles to unite the population under her rule. Moon must convince the Tiamatians to rebuild a technologically advanced society from scratch before the return of the Hegemony in 150 years.

Reede Kullervo is a biotechnologist and a member of a secret society called The Brotherhood. He is also an expert in the Old Empire’s technology, but he has been unable to successfully recreate the water of life. Kullervo befriends BZ Gundhalinu, then betrays him and steals the faster than light stardrive they created together. Kullervo is kidnapped and enslaved by the Source, a high-level Brotherhood operative.

Gundhalinu returns to Tiamat as the new Chief Justice and head of the Hegemonic government. Kullervo also arrives on Tiamat, where he meets Ariele Dawntreader, Moon’s daughter. He realizes he can speak to the mers. Ariele and Kullervo begin a romantic relationship. Tammis Dawntreader, Moon’s son, becomes a sibyl. He marries a woman while simultaneously struggling to accept his own bisexuality, which is forbidden among the Summer clans. Sparks learns that Ariele and Tammis were actually fathered by Gundhalinu. Betrayed, he joins the Brotherhood. Moon and Gundhalinu reestablish their romantic relationship.

The Source kidnaps Ariele and Kullervo to blackmail Moon. Sparks rejects the Brotherhood and stages a rescue. Gundhalinu attempts to stop the mer hunts and is arrested for treason. Moon discovers the purpose of the mers: they are meant to maintain the sibyl network. Mer hunting has driven them to the brink of extinction, placing the network in danger.

Kullervo learns that he has access to the recorded memories of Vanamoinen, the creator of the sibyl network. The network had orchestrated Vanamoinen’s return in the event that the integrity of the network was ever threatened. Kullervo and Tammis repair the sibyl net, though Tammis is killed in the attempt. Moon is granted knowledge of the coordinates of other Old Empire planets. She offers to share this information with the Hegemony if the mer hunts cease. In her interaction with the network, she loses her sibyl-hood. Gundhalinu is released from prison and restored to his position as Chief Justice. Kullervo and Ariele start a new life together on Tiamat. Sparks leaves Tiamat with Kullervo’s former crew.

== Reception ==
Kirkus Reviews called the book "absorbing and satisfying", praising its new ideas, in contrast to the prequel's reliance on literary allusions. However, the review also called the novel "overcomplicated" with "flabby patches".

The novel was nominated for the 1992 Hugo Award for Best Novel and 1992 Locus Award for Best Science Fiction Novel.
