= The Snow Queen (Vinge novel) =

1980 novel by Joan D. Vinge

- Cover of first edition (hardcover)
- Author: Joan D. Vinge
- Cover artist: Leo and Diane Dillon
- Language: English
- Series: The Snow Queen Cycle
- Genre: Science fiction novel
- Publisher: Dial Press
- Publication date: 1980
- Publication place: United States
- Media type: Print (hardback & paperback)
- Pages: 471
- Award: Hugo Award for Best Novel, Locus Award for Best Science Fiction Novel (all 1981)
- ISBN: 0-8037-7739-6
- OCLC: 5412267
- Dewey Decimal: 813/.5/4
- LC Class: PZ4.V78 Sn PS3572.I53
- Followed by: World's End (1984)

The Snow Queen is a 1980 science fiction novel by American writer Joan D. Vinge. It won the Hugo Award for Best Novel in 1981, and was also nominated for the Nebula Award for Best Novel in 1981.

Based on the 1844 fairy tale of the same name by Hans Christian Andersen, The Snow Queen takes place on a mostly oceanic planet called Tiamat. Tiamat's suns orbit a black hole, which facilitates interstellar wormhole travel and connects Tiamat to the rest of the civilized galaxy (the "Hegemony", the remnants of a fallen Galactic Empire).

The Snow Queen was influenced by the poet Robert Graves's 1948 study of mythology, The White Goddess.

== Premise ==
The Galactic Empire, which once ruled large portions of the galaxy, fell into decay millennia ago. A small remnant of this Old Empire coalesces into a group of seven planets known as the Hegemony. Though the Hegemony has large-scale interstellar travel and high technology, it has not yet returned to the Empire's level of technological prowess.

Tiamat is an oceanic planet, accessible to the Hegemony only through wormhole travel. It orbits a double-star system impacted by a third stellar companion, the Summer Star, that destabilizes the "Black Gate" every 150 years. When the Black Gate is closed, no offworld travelers are able to reach Tiamat for more than a century. And any Tiamatan citizen who makes it offworld is considered proscribed and permanently exiled from their homeworld. The residents of Tiamat are split into two clans: "Winters", who advocate technological progress and trade with offworlders, and "Summers", who depend on their folk traditions and rigid social distinctions for survival. Both cultures are matriarchal and every 150 years, control of Tiamat's government switches between Winter rule and Summer rule via the ritual execution of the sovereign ruler - a "Snow Queen" in Winter, a "Summer Queen" in Summer. This is celebrated in a worldwide multi-day festival known as the Change and culminates in a hedonistic Mask Night. Children conceived during this festival are known as merry-be-gots and are considered lucky.

The Hegemony's interest in Tiamat lies in mers, a species of sea-dwelling creatures whose blood contains a smartmatter virus that halts the aging process. Mers are hunted as frequently as possible during the Winter years. The "water of life" produced from their blood allows for virtual immortality. A single Snow Queen reigns for the entire 150-year season by taking the water of life daily. She reigns in Carbuncle, the only city on the planet, itself a relic of the Old Empire functioning through the cold of High Winter and the melting waters and heat of High Summer. During Winter rule, offworlders bring technology to Tiamat in exchange for the water of life. At the end of Winter, they leave Tiamat and destroy all high technology, leaving Summers to rule under an agrarian lifestyle. In this way, they exploit Tiamat and prevent it from developing the technology to rebel.

== Plot summary ==
Arienrhod, the Snow Queen, has secretly implanted several Summer women with clones of herself, in the hopes of extending her rule past her ritual execution at the end of Winter. Moon Dawntreader Summer is the only one of these clones to survive to adolescence. She and her cousin Sparks are lovers. Moon becomes a sibyl, a position of high status among the Summer people. Sibyls are both feared and revered; they possess the ability to answer any question by going into a trance state. Sibyls believe that they receive visions from the Lady, a sea goddess. Sparks is not chosen to become a sibyl. Angry at Moon for joining the sibyls without him and curious about his offworld heritage, he travels to Carbuncle, Tiamat's capital. He is immediately caught up by Arienrhod and eventually becomes the "Starbuck", the Snow Queen's consort and commander of the mer hunts.

Moon receives a message, apparently from Sparks, urging her to come to Carbuncle, though sibyls may not legally enter the city. On her way, she becomes entangled with smugglers and is taken offworld. This is normally a one way trip for a Tiamatan citizen. Hegemony law prevents any native Tiamatian from returning after leaving the planet, fearing that travelers would realize how Tiamat is being exploited and use this knowledge to foment rebellion. Arienrhod is crushed; she had planned to draw Moon to Carbuncle and make her the next Summer Queen. Moon was supposed to reject the Summer fear of technology and develop resistance to the Hegemony during the next Summer reign. Arienrhod devises a backup plan; she will unleash a plague at the Change which will kill most Summers and spare most Winters, allowing Tiamat to continue its technological growth before the Hegemony returns.

Moon is taken to the capital planet, Kharemough, and discovers that the Winters' prejudice against sibyls is a political tool used by the Hegemony to preserve its control of technology on Tiamat. Sibyls are highly respected throughout the other planets of the Hegemony; only on Tiamat, due to a careful reinforcement of superstitions during the reign of Winter, are they considered dangerous and mentally unstable. The sibyls are actually part of a data network devised by the Old Empire as a way to rebuild society more quickly after the Empire's fall. Sibyls have the ability to communicate with a vast electronic databank, which explains their ability to answer seemingly unknowable questions. Moon learns from another sibyl that Sparks is in danger, and returns to Tiamat illegally. Due to time dilation, five years pass on Tiamat while Moon is only gone for a period of weeks.

After a crash landing and short sojourn as a captive of Winter outlaws, Moon returns to Carbuncle and confronts Arienrhod. Arienrhod's plan to unleash the plague is foiled, and Moon is chosen to become the next Summer Queen. She begins to prepare Tiamat to face the Hegemony as a peer when the 150 years of summer end and interstellar travel is again possible through the black hole.

== Sequels ==
Vinge wrote a sequel to The Snow Queen called The Summer Queen (1991), with a shorter novel, World's End (1984), linking the two. A prequel, Tangled Up In Blue, was published in 2000.

== Critical reception ==
Vinge's novel was well received when it initially came out. Later reviewers have admired the complex world-building Vinge created with the planet of Tiamat and the Hegemony calling it a "carefully crafted universe" and "impeccable and expansive". Reaction to the characters and plot have been mixed. Some reviewers have seen the characters as "distinctive and believable" while others have felt the characters too casual. The plot has been called "fast-paced and eventful" and "the kind of book that felt much shorter than the 500-odd pages in spans", but criticized because "the love story holds very few surprises especially if you’ve read the original Hans Christian Anderson fairytale".
