= Earthseed (novel) =

1983 novel by Pamela Sargent

- Author: Pamela Sargent
- Language: English
- Genre: Science Fiction; Young adult fiction
- Published: 1983
- Publication place: United States

Earthseed is a young adult novel by Pamela Sargent, first published in 1983. It is set in the unknown future about a group of teenagers who live and grow up on Ship, preparing themselves to live on a completely new planet.

Earthseed is the first book in the Seed Trilogy. The sequels are Farseed, published in 2007, and Seed Seeker, published in 2010.

== Storyline ==
Many years into the future, a last-ditch attempt to save humanity was created, a project known as Ship, an AI containing DNA of different Earth flora and fauna and sent into space to find a new planet. Also created are a group of children using genes from the leaders of the project, all raised by Ship, and of whom Zoheret is the main character. Now in their teens, the Zoheret and the others are subjected to their last test, a competition within the Ship's Hollow, a simulated Earth-like environment. The teens are moved into the Hollow and told to live there to gain the skills necessary to live and survive on their new planet. Very quickly, Ho and Manuel, two troublemakers, split off from the rest. Zoheret and the others are left to make a farming community, with Zoheret's friend and roommate, Lillka, as the group leader.

All goes well until it is discovered that Ho's group has started to steal some of the main settlement's supplies. This upsets many of the main settlement's members, and they go out to find the smaller group's home base. The vengeful group ends up burning down the cabins of the other community. Angry and confused, Zoheret and her friend, Bonnie (accused of cooperating with Ho and Manuel's group) set off to plead with Ship; however, Ship is unwilling to let them out of the Hollow. They finally get Ship to let them get food to take back to their settlement.

Zoheret develops a relationship with Dmitri, another teen, while Lillka is slowly replaced as leader by another boy, Tonio. Things for the small community are made worse when they awake to find their fields incinerated by Ho's group. The settlement leaves to hunt down Ho and Manuel's group, while Zoheret and Bonnie, still concerned over Ship's odd behavior, lead a small group back to Ship. Instead, they stumble across an older man, Aleksandr, who introduces himself as Dmitri's older brother, a remnant of Ship's previous attempt at the Project. He takes Zoheret and the others in her group into Ship's corridors and introduces them to the other six members of his group, including Zoheret's own older brother, Yusef. They explain that Ship had created them years ago when it had found two planets suitable for life. However, neither turned out adequate (the first having a poisonous atmosphere, the second inhabited by intelligent life that might be burdens), and the group was given two options: live their lives out in the Hollow, without reproducing, or go into cryostasis. Most of the group goes into cryostasis and are now in the process of being revived.

Armed with this knowledge, the younger group go back to their settlement and are immediately captured by Ho. Threatening her friends, he sends Zoheret over to get supplies. Upon reaching the settlement, Zoheret is treated to another shock: another group of adults have been revived. These are the leaders of the project, having put themselves secretly into cryostasis, and who have now taken over the settlement and shut down the Ship's systems. A war between the two groups starts, forcing Zoheret to unite her community with Ho and Manuel's and to ally with the Aleksandr and his own group. The younger group eventually wins, after having turned Ship's systems back on. There are losses on both sides with Zoheret losing an arm when her own genetic mother shoots her. They settle on Ship's new planet, the adults placed in cryostasis, having learned many lessons. Zoheret becomes the group's leader and Ship leaves, setting off to find a new planet to continue the Project on for other groups to come. Zoheret ends up with Manuel and they agree to live together.
