= Peter Emshwiller =

American novelist

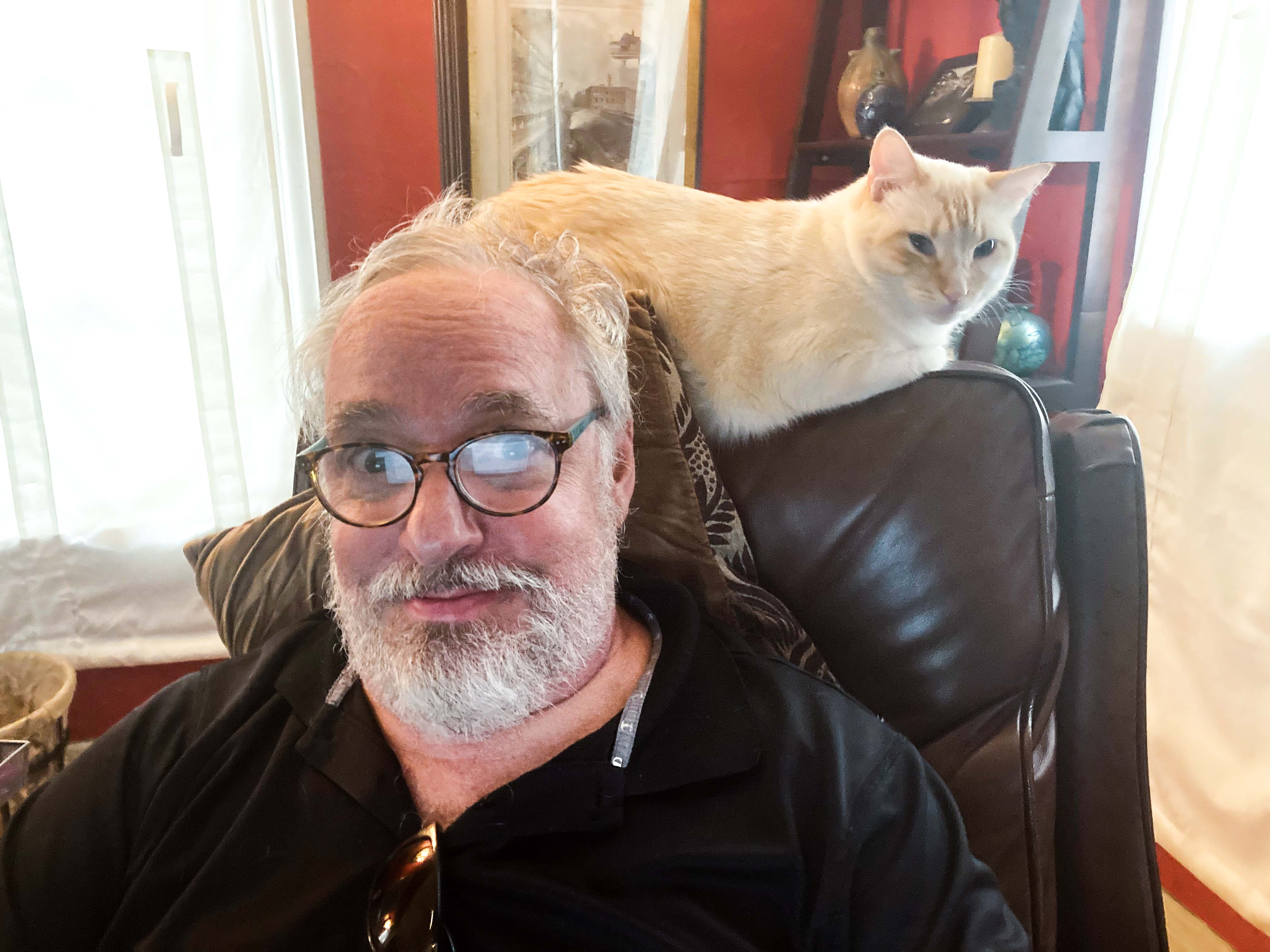
- Emshwiller and his cat
- Born: February 5, 1959 (age 67); Levittown, New York, U.S.
- Occupations: Novelist; artist; magazine editor; filmmaker; screenwriter; actor
- Years active: 1963–present
- Spouse: Margaret Mayo McGlynn (m. 1991)
- Parent(s): Ed Emshwiller; Carol Emshwiller

Peter Robert "Stoney" Emshwiller is an American novelist, artist, magazine editor, filmmaker, screenwriter, and actor. He is perhaps best known for his viral video "Later That Same Life" (a teaser for the full-length film of the same name, now in pre-production), which featured him at middle age talking to his actual teenaged self.

== Personal life ==
He was born in Levittown, New York. His father, Ed Emshwiller, was a visual artist, and his mother, Carol Emshwiller, was an author.

Emshwiller graduated from MacArthur High School in 1977 and married Margaret Mayo McGlynn in 1991.

His work has appeared under his own name as well as P.R. Emshwiller, Stoney Emshwiller, Peter McGlynn, Stoney McGuinn, McGuinn Stoney, and Peter Roberts.

== Writing and editing ==
Peter Emshwiller was managing editor of both The Twilight Zone Magazine and Night Cry from 1985 to 1989.

In 1991 his Nebula Award-nominated science fiction novel The Host was published by Bantam Books. In 1992, its sequel, Short Blade, was released (also by Bantam). A paperback copy of this novel was briefly featured in the Quentin Tarantino film Jackie Brown as the top book in the Billingsley shopping bag during the dressing room money exchange scene at the Del Amo Mall. Both works have repeatedly been optioned as feature films since they were published (notably by Jerry Bruckheimer from 2004 through 2007) but never made into movies.

Emshwiller's humorous poetry appears regularly in Asinine Poetry, and he has had non-fiction articles published in many magazines including The Writer, The New York Observer, Locus, and The Long Island Tribune.

In 2008 he co-wrote the screenplay for As Advertised, a sitcom pilot.

Emshwiller is represented by Chris Lotts at the Vicinanza Literary Agency for novels and, for screenwriting, Vince Gerardis of Created By. His sitcom writing team is represented by Steve Smith of Stagecoach Entertainment and Katie Cates at ICM.

== Acting ==
Performing under the name Stoney Emshwiller, Emshwiller has been acting since he was a child. He has appeared in numerous stage productions in both New York (off Broadway) and Los Angeles, as well as in films and on TV. From 1988 to 1991 he sang with the 12-person choral ensemble The Euterpeans, including performing a concert at Carnegie Recital Hall.

In 2004 he signed with the William Morris Agency as a voiceover actor. He has since moved to AT&A for his voiceover representation and the Pinnacle Agency for commercials. Much of his current voice work is for radio advertisements, cartoons, and video games.

In 2005 Emshwiller helped found DANGERdanger, a comedy improv troupe which performs at such venues as iO West, the Westside Eclectic, and Second City Los Angeles.

== Art ==
In 1985, Emshwiller's oil paintings were exhibited in a show at 380 Gallery in Greenwich Village, NYC. Since then his art has been sold to private collectors, and his paintings, illustrations, and cartoons have been published in various magazines, including Gallery Magazine, Mongrel Literary Journal, and Twilight Zone Magazine.

His artwork has also appeared in movies such as Star Kid, The Empty Mirror, Hellraiser: Bloodline, and Indictment: The McMartin Trial, as well as episodes of Maybe It's Me, George Lopez, and Arli$$, and many other film and TV projects.

He also worked for many years (1992–2004) as a set dresser, lead man, set decorator, and art director for movies and television.

== Later That Same Life viral video ==
Emshwiller began his film project as a young man, but he said he "avoided completing his piece de resistance for almost 40 years because he felt his life wasn't interesting enough for the boy that he once was." A health scare prompted him to return to the project. He created a sizzle reel to enter a crowdfunding contest run by Ovation TV and RocketHub. The project achieved its crowdsourcing goal within three weeks. The sizzle reel, posted on YouTube, received over one million hits within four weeks, and Emshwiller was interviewed in a variety of media. Slate noted, "The power of the project comes through even in the short clip... with the 56-year-old man reflecting on his career, relationships, and regrets with an ambitious, constantly reacting past self."

== Acting credits ==
- Final Fantasy XV: Episode Ardyn - Assorted Voices
- Badge of a Quitter - Dad
- Cosmos: A Spacetime Odyssey - George Tilton, Guard
- Emotional Homicide - Paul Roger Hodgkins
- Winx Club - Knut the Ogre, King Erendor
- Life on a Stick - 50's TV Guy
- As Advertised - Murray
- Random Luck - Claude
- Stacked with Daniel Negreanu - New Jersey Groom & German Eurodude
- The Lord of the Rings: The Battle for Middle-Earth II - Axe-Thrower Dwarf/Demolisher Dwarf/Elven King Thranduil
- Harvey's Think - Harvey
- Silent Hill: Homecoming - Mike Stewart, Additional Voices
- Code Geass: Lelouch of the Rebellion - Odysseus, Additional Voices
- The Lord of the Rings: The Battle for Middle-earth II: The Rise of the Witch-king - King Thranduil / Dwarven Warriors
- EverQuest II: Kingdom of Sky - Custodian Zaddar Sullissia/Deputy Stoutgut/Fluwkowir Haggleton
- In the Land of Milk and Money - Tyler Wagner
- Ghost in the Shell: Stand Alone Complex (assorted voices)
- Cowboy Bebop (assorted voices)
- The Pickler Report - Secretary Weimaier
- Ratheon Ethics - Sam
- Southshore Inn - Raxton, Mayor Brindle, additional voices
- The n00bs - Warrior Bob, Borwack, Innkeeper, additional voices
- Hungers - Form
- Sunstone - The Shape
- Eclipse - Male
- Dubs - Robert
- Sur Faces - Frankie
- Family Focus - Pete
- Scape-Mates (voice)
- Film with Three Dancers (voice)
- Branches - Kid
- Image, Flesh and Voice - Son
- Junior Trek - Jim
- Relativity - Running Child
- Hallelujah the Hills - Boy Child

== Bibliography ==
=== Novels ===
- LEVELS: The Host (1991)
- LEVELS: Short Blade (1992)
- The Coil Shuffle (1994)
- Privilege and the Hummer Girl (2010)
- LEVELS: Jesusland (2017)

=== Nonfiction and humor ===
- "The End of an Error," Long Island Tribune (1977)
- "Kelly Freas," Twilight Zone Magazine (1986)
- "King Kong Lived," Twilight Zone Magazine (1986)
- "Television Land," Twilight Zone Magazine (1987)
- "Horror of Horrors," Twilight Zone Magazine (1987)
- "What's Utne?" Twilight Zone Magazine (1987)
- "Illuminations: Prophet of the Damned," Twilight Zone Magazine (1987)
- "Television Preview," Twilight Zone Magazine (1988)
- "Hair-Raisers," Twilight Zone Magazine (1988)
- "Short Takes" (regular monthly column), Gallery Magazine (1988–1991)
- "Book Talk: Backlash," Gallery Magazine (1989)
- "Book Talk: Fade," Gallery Magazine (1989)
- "Book Talk: King's The Stand," Gallery Magazine (1989)
- "The Ice Men Climbeth," Gallery Magazine (1989)
- "The Night of the Trilly," Gallery Magazine (1989)
- "The Ice Men Climbeth," Gallery Magazine (1990)
- "Queasy Rider," Gallery Magazine (1990)
- "Cool!" (with Marc Lichter), Gallery Magazine (1990)
- "Are You?" (with Marc Lichter), Gallery Magazine (1990)
- "It's Academic" (with Marc Lichter), Gallery Magazine (1990)
- "Boo!" (with Marc Lichter), Gallery Magazine (1990)
- "USA Tomorrow" (with Marc Lichter), Gallery Magazine (1990)
- "My Years as a Slush Killer," Writer's Digest Magazine (1990)
- "Read This," The New York Review of Science Fiction (1992)
- "Best Flick Picks," The New York Observer (1992)
- "The Scourge of Unlawful Infants," Asinine Poetry (2009)
- "She Says," Asinine Poetry (2010)
- "Stuff," Asinine Poetry (2010)

=== Screenplays and teleplays ===
- "Junior Trek" (1969)
- "Family Focus" (additional dialogue) (1976)
- "Dubs" (additional dialogue) (1978)
- "Harvey's Think" (1979)
- "From Within" (with Richie Narvaez) (2006)
- "As Advertised" (with Chris Lusti) (2008)
- "Almost Cheating" (with Chris Lusti) (2010)
- "The Razzles" (with Chris Lusti, TW Leshner, Steven Pritchard) (2012)
- "Leftovers" (with Chris Lusti) (2012)
- "Mile Marker 16" (with Chris Lusti, TW Leshner, Steven Pritchard) (2015)
- "Space Snatchers" (pilot) (2015)
