= Eyes of Amber =

Cover of the issue of Analog in which "Eyes of Amber" first appeared.

"Eyes of Amber" is a science fiction short story by American writer Joan D. Vinge. It was first published as the cover story for the June 1977 issue of Analog Science Fiction and Fact.

== Synopsis ==
When bandit queen T'uupieh — a native of Titan — discovers a human space probe, she thinks it is a supernatural entity, and brings it with her to serve as an advisor. The humans monitoring the probe must decide whether to interfere with her culture by dissuading her from committing atrocities, or sell videos of her atrocities in order to fund their continued research.

== Reception ==
"Eyes of Amber" won the 1978 Hugo Award for Best Novelette; Vinge subsequently reported learning that bookies had offered 40-to-1 odds against her winning.

A review in Foundation drew attention to the contrast between the quasi-medieval society on Titan and the "advanced technology of the (probe's) control room", while at Black Gate, Steven H. Silver noted that the story is predicated upon cultural imperialism.

James Nicoll has observed that T'uupieh's species is "not very alien", and "resemble(s) 1940s Leigh Brackett aliens rather than anything scientifically plausible"; similarly, Mike Ashley has described it as a "rationalized planetary romance".
