= Sonya Dorman =

American poet (1924–2005)

- Born: Sonya Gloria Hess; June 4, 1924; New York City, U.S.
- Died: February 14, 2005 (aged 80); Taos, New Mexico, U.S.
- Occupation: Poet
- Spouse: Jack Dorman (m. 1950; div. 1986)
- Children: 1
- Writing career
- Genre: Science fiction

Sonya Dorman (June 4, 1924 – February 14, 2005), born Sonya Gloria Hess, was the working name of Sonya Dorman Hess. She was born in New York City in 1924 and died in Taos, New Mexico on February 14, 2005, at the age of 80.

Dorman published around two dozen science fiction short stories between 1961 and 1980, and she was associated with science fiction's "New Wave" of experimental writing. According to Diane Zigo and Michael Moore, Dorman was part of a group of women writers (including writers such as C.J. Cherryh, Carol Emshwiller, Tanith Lee, Judith Merrill, Joanna Russ, and Kate Wilhem) who "emerged as groundbreaking and prolific writers" in the 1960 and 1970s writing feminist science fiction. Dorman appeared in Harlan Ellison's 1967 anthology Dangerous Visions, with the story "Go, Go, Go, Said the Bird," a story set in a post-apocalyptic future where cannibalism is accepted. In 1978, three of Dorman's short stories were gathered together in young adult novel, Planet Patrol.

Dorman's best-known work of science fiction is the story "When I Was Miss Dow", which was published in Galaxy in 1966 and has been reprinted numerous times and received a James Tiptree, Jr. retrospective award nomination. According to Susan Wood and Chris Morgan, Dorman's "When I Was Miss Dow," can be seen as part of a tradition of "woman-as-alien" that "has a long tradition in science fiction." Further, they argue that Dorman uses "this convention... to examine the restraints, damages, and dangers that the patterns of 'female' and 'male' have imposed on human beings."

Dorman also published in non Science Fiction magazines including Redbook and The Saturday Evening Post. In 1966, for example, her short story "Voyage to the Stars" was published in The Saturday Evening Post.

In addition to her Science Fiction writing, Dorman is perhaps best known outside of the world of science fiction as a poet publishing multiple volumes of poetry including her collected Poems published in 1970 as well as Palace of Earth (1984), Constellations of the Inner Eye (1991), and Carrying What You Love (1996). One of her poems, Corruption of Metals, received honors within science fiction circles by winning the Rhysling Award of the Science Fiction Poetry Association in 1978. Pamela Sargent, a science fiction editor, drew connections between feminist poetry and science fiction including poems by Dorman in her anthology, Women of Wonder (1975).

== Personal life ==
Dorman was raised by foster parents in West Newbury, Massachusetts. After one year of college she worked in variety of jobs including working as a stable hand, maid, fish canner, riding instructor, and tuna boat cook. She had a brief first marriage (1945–46) before marrying Jack Dorman, an engineer, in 1950. The couple had a daughter in 1959, and they lived in New York and Connecticut in the 1970s. After her divorce in 1986, Dorman moved to Taos, New Mexico, where she began publishing under her maiden name and where she lived until her death.
