= When I Was Miss Dow =

- Short story by Sonya Dorman
- Country: USA
- Genre(s): Science fiction

Publication
- Published in: Galaxy Science Fiction
- Publication type: Periodical
- Media type: Print
- Publication date: June 1966

"When I Was Miss Dow" is a short story by the American writer Sonya Dorman. It was first published in Galaxy Science Fiction in June 1966. In the story, a being on a planet colonized by people from Earth is reformed as a female human, and has a relationship with a colonist which is more intense that expected.

== Background ==
Sonya Dorman was a breeder of akitas, which may relate to the element in the story about dog breeding.

== Story summary ==
The story is written in the present tense. The narrator is one of the indigenous people of a planet recently colonized by humans from Earth; they have one sex, one brain lobe, and they can change their form. The Warden and the narrator's uncle ("by the Warden's fourth conjunction"), believing they should get on with the colonists, and that the narrator should bring back credits and sulfas, advise him/her to change form. After "four days in the tank absorbing the female Terran pattern", and with a second brain lobe, he/she becomes Martha Dow, a botanist, and assistant to Dr. Arnold Proctor, the colony's head biologist.

He is studying kootas, dogs of this planet bred for racing. Some have a genetic defect which makes them become lame. The narrator's koota is X-rayed by Proctor, and he finds evidence of the defect. Proctor, seeming to take advantage of Martha's anxiety about the dog, starts to seduce her, and they begin a relationship. He assumes the narrator is a Terran; she realizes that the Warden registered her with the colony as such.

The Warden is angry about the narrator's liaison with only one man. "You were supposed to start with the Doctor, and go on from there." The Warden and the narrator's uncle are addicted to sulfadiazole and expected her to bring back credits additional to her pay. She finds that friends who have borrowed female patterns have not received a second brain lobe; she was given it, says the Warden, to make her more efficient.

The narrator enjoys being Martha. The Doctor dies suddenly one day, while the narrator is with him. She brings the body home and asks the Warden to put him in one of the cell banks; but he says a Terran cannot be recreated, so she returns him to his quarters, taking home a memento, Proctor's wooden carving of a murger bird. The Warden thinks it might be too late to return the narrator to his/her own pattern, but he/she is able to revert.

== Reception ==
"When I Was Miss Dow" made first ballot for the Nebula Award for Best Short Story, and was included in Nebula Award Stories Two, published in 1967. Over the following years it was translated into German, French, Spanish and Dutch. In 1995 it was nominated for a retrospective James Tiptree Jr. Award.

== See also ==
- Shapeshifting
- Gender in speculative fiction
