= Ed Emshwiller =

American illustrator and filmmaker (1925–1990)

- Emshwiller in 1969
- Born: Edmund Alexander Emshwiller; February 16, 1925; Lansing, Michigan, U.S.
- Died: July 26, 1990 (aged 65); Santa Clarita, California, U.S.
- Spouse: Carol Emshwiller (née Fries)

Edmund Alexander Emshwiller (February 16, 1925 – July 27, 1990) was an American visual artist notable for his science fiction illustrations and his pioneering experimental films. He usually signed his illustrations as Emsh but sometimes used Ed Emsh, Ed Emsler, Willer and others. (Note: From 1951 at least to the mid-1960s, he was generally "Emsh" or "Ed Emsh" for pulp magazine covers and Ed Emshwiller for book covers. He used those names routinely for interior illustrations only after a couple years when he was more often "Willer" or "Ed Emsler" or "Ed Alexander". Evidently he debuted in May 1951 as Willer for the serial novel Mars Child (Outpost Mars) and Emsh for two other stories in the same issue. For June and July (when the novel concluded) he did the covers as Emsh and Willer respectively. He was Willer as illustrator of the novel; Emsh and Ed Alexander for two other July stories.)

== Background and early career ==
Born February 16, 1925, in Lansing, Michigan, he graduated from the University of Michigan in 1947, and then studied at École des Beaux Arts (1949–1950) in Paris with his wife, novelist Carol Emshwiller (née Fries), whom he married on August 30, 1949. He also studied at the Art Students League of New York (1950–1951).

== Illustrator ==
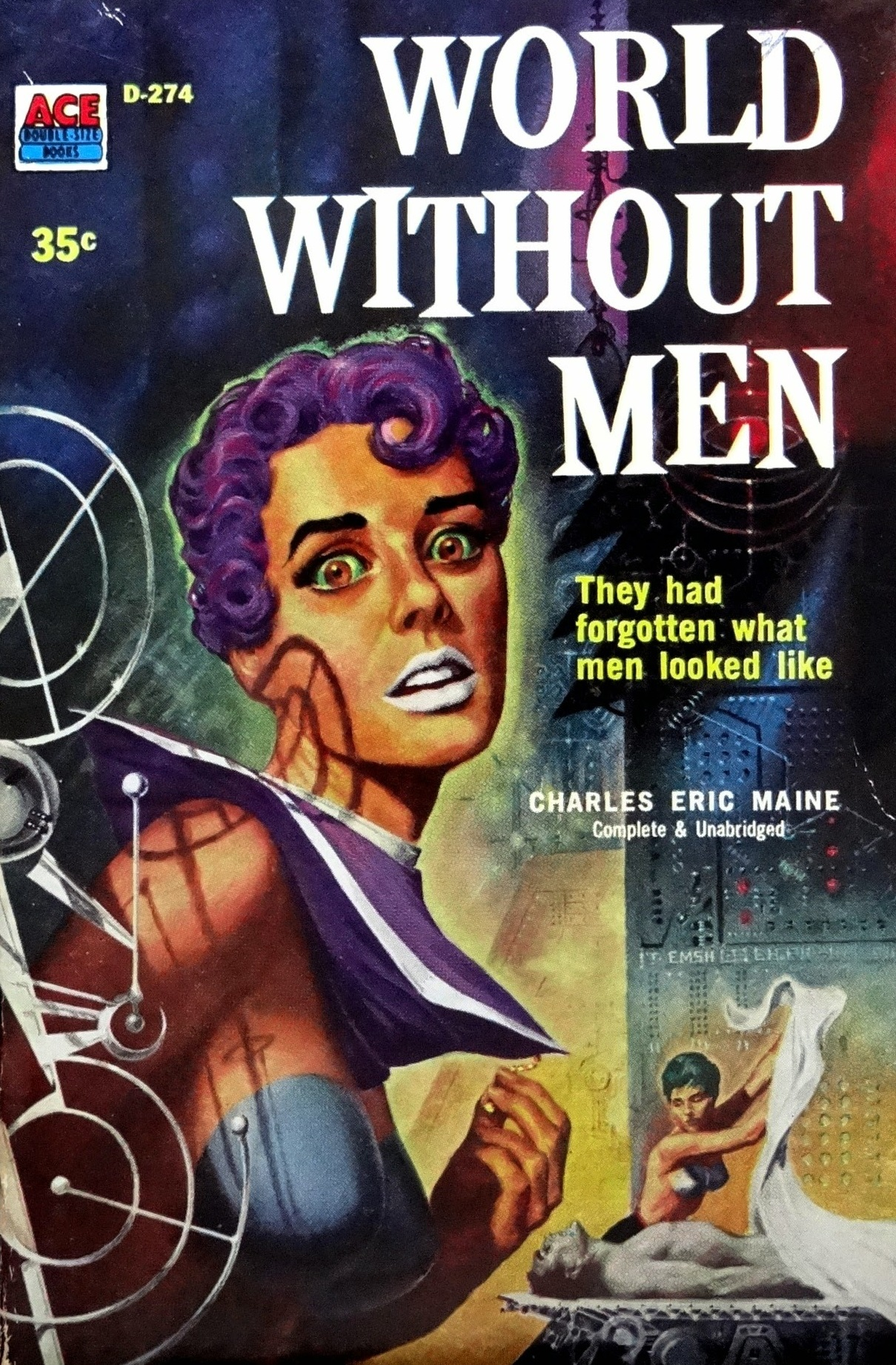
Cover of World Without Men by Charles Eric Maine – illustration by Ed Emshwiller – Ace Books, 1958

From 1951 to 1979, while living in Levittown, New York, Emshwiller created covers and interior illustrations for dozens of science fiction paperbacks and magazines, notably Galaxy Science Fiction and The Magazine of Fantasy & Science Fiction. He debuted in the pulp magazines with about 50 interior illustrations and four cover paintings for the May to December 1951 issues of Galaxy, a monthly edited by H. L. Gold. In that year or 1952 he also did his first book cover for the U.S. paperback edition of Odd John (Galaxy Publishing Corp.) Because he experimented with a diversity of techniques, there is no typical Emsh cover. His painterly treatment for the August 1951 cover of Galaxy Science Fiction prefigures later work by Leo and Diane Dillon.

== Film and video ==
A frame from Ed Emshwiller's video Sunstone (1979) was used on the front cover of this 1982 book published by Addison-Wesley.

Thanatopsis (1962), featuring brother Mac Emshwiller and sharing the title with William Cullen Bryant's 1817 poem, was his first five-minute film. In 1964, a Ford Foundation grant allowed Emshwiller to pursue his interest in film. Active in the New American Cinema movement of the 1960s and early 1970s, he created multimedia performance pieces and did cine-dance and experimental films, such as the 38-minute Relativity (1966). He also was a cinematographer on documentaries, such as Emile de Antonio's Painters Painting (1972), and feature films, such as Time of the Heathen (1962) and Adolfas Mekas' Hallelujah the Hills (1963).

Emshwiller's footage of Bob Dylan singing "Only a Pawn in Their Game" on July 6, 1963, at a Voters' Registration Rally in Greenwood, Mississippi, was shot for Jack Willis' 1963 documentary The Streets of Greenwood and appears in D. A. Pennebaker's Dylan documentary, Dont Look Back (1967). For the US Information Agency, he directed Faces of America (1965), Art Scence, USA (1966), and Project Apollo (1968) and his work appeared in the Agency's The 21st Century: The Shape of Films to Come (1968), a film that presents examples of films shown at Expo '67 that feature startling new visual effects and innovations. Filme with Three Dancers was made in 1970.

His films of the 1960s were mostly shot in 16mm color, and some of these included double exposures created simply by rewinding the cameras. He was one of the earliest video artists. With Scape-Mates (1972), he began his experiments in video, combining computer animation with live-action. In 1979, he produced Sunstone, a groundbreaking three-minute 3-D computer-generated video made at the New York Institute of Technology with Alvy Ray Smith. Now in the Museum of Modern Art's video collection, Sunstone was exhibited at SIGGRAPH 79, the 1981 Mill Valley Film Festival and other festivals. In 1979, it was shown on WNET's Video/Film Review, and a Sunstone frame was used on the front cover of Fundamentals of Interactive Computer Graphics, published in 1982 by Addison-Wesley.

== CalArts ==
After a period as artist-in-residence at the Television Laboratory WNET/13 (New York), where he worked on the effects for The Lathe of Heaven among other projects, he moved to California, where he was the founder of the CalArts Computer Animation Lab and served as provost and dean of the School of Film/Video at the California Institute of Arts from 1979 to 1990. He also served as provost from 1981 through 1986. In 1987, he created his electronic video opera Hunger for the 1987 Los Angeles Arts Festival, in partnership with composer Morton Subotnick. It was his last completed work, also presented in October 1989 at the Ars Electronica Festival in Linz, Austria.

== Influences ==
Among Enshwiller's neighbors in Levittown was Bill Griffith, later acclaimed for his Zippy syndicated comic strip. Griffith's parents sometimes posed as models for Emshwiller's illustrations. Griffith, who credited Emshwiller as an influence on his becoming an artist, was painted by Emshwiller into the front cover of Original Science Fiction (September 1957). Griffith commented, "He didn't point me to cartooning, but he pointed me into art in general and showed me a way of understanding how within one artist, there could exist this pop culture impulse and a fine art impulse."

== Archives and awards ==
Emshwiller won one of the inaugural Hugo Awards in 1953, as the previous year's best "Cover Artist" (a tie with Hannes Bok). Cover artists and interior illustrators were not thereafter distinguished by the Hugo Award for Best Artist under various names; he won four more during the 1960s under the current "Professional Artist" distinction. On June 16, 2007, he became the third artist inducted by the Science Fiction Hall of Fame. (Note: After inducting 36 fantasy and science fiction writers and editors from 1996 to 2004, the Science Fiction and Fantasy Hall of Fame dropped "fantasy" and made non-literary contributors eligible. Chesley Bonestell inaugurated the "Art" category in 2005 and Frank Kelly Freas followed in 2006.) His paintings of aliens were displayed in the Alien Encounters exhibition of the Science Fiction Museum, which houses the hall of fame, at that time (September 10, 2006, to October 30, 2007).

His papers are archived at the California Institute of Arts.

== Personal life ==
Carol and Ed Emshwiller had three children—Eve Emshwiller, screenwriter Susan Emshwiller (Pollock) and actor-novelist Stoney Peter Emshwiller (The Host, Short Blade). Family members, including his brother Maclellan Emshwiller, often served as models in his illustrations. Carol and Eve Emshwiller can be seen on a Galaxy Science Fiction cover (January 1957).

Emshwiller died of cancer on July 25, 1990, in Santa Clarita, California, where he was cremated.

== Books ==
- Ortiz, Luis, Ed Emshwiller, Carol Emshwiller, and Alex Eisenstein. Emshwiller: Infinity x Two: The Art & Life of Ed & Carol Emshwiller. New York: Nonstop Press, 2007. ISBN 978-1-933065-09-0.
