= Pamela Sargent =

American novelist (born 1948)

- Born: March 20, 1948 (age 78); Ithaca, New York, U.S.
- Education: State University of New York
- Occupations: Novelist; science fiction author; editor
- Known for: Earthseed, Venus of Dreams, Watchstar trilogy

Pamela Sargent (born March 20, 1948) is an American feminist, science fiction author, and editor. She has an MA in classical philosophy and has won a Nebula Award.

Sargent wrote a trilogy concerning the terraforming of Venus that is sometimes compared to Kim Stanley Robinson's Mars trilogy, but predates it. She also edited various anthologies to celebrate the contributions of women in the history of science fiction including the Women of Wonder series. She also edited the Nebula Award Showcase from 1995 to 1997. She is noted for writing alternate history stories. She also collaborated with George Zebrowski on four Star Trek novels.

== Personal life ==
Pamela Sargent was born in Ithaca, New York, and raised as an atheist. She attended the State University of New York at Binghamton, attaining a master's degree in philosophy. She currently lives in Albany, New York.

== Bibliography ==
=== Novels ===
- Cloned Lives (1976)
- The Sudden Star (1979) a.k.a. The White Death (1980)
- The Golden Space (1982)
- The Alien Upstairs (1983)
- The Shore of Women (1986)
- Alien Child (1988)
- Ruler of the Sky (1993)
- Climb the Wind (1998)

Seed trilogy

1. Earthseed (1983)
2. Farseed (2007)
3. Seed Seeker (2010)

Venus

1. Venus of Dreams (1986)
2. Venus of Shadows (1988)
3. Child of Venus (2001)

Watchstar

1. Watchstar (1980)
2. Eye of the Comet (1984)
3. Homesmind (1984)

Star Trek: The Original Series (co-written with George Zebrowski

- Heart of the Sun (1997)
- Across the Universe (1999)
- Garth of Izar (2003)

Star Trek: The Next Generation (co-written with George Zebrowski

- A Fury Scorned (1996)

=== Short fiction ===
Collections

- Cloned Lives (1976)
- Starshadows (1977)
- The Golden Space (1983)
- The Best of Pamela Sargent (1987) with Martin H. Greenberg
- The Mountain Cage and Other Stories (2002)
- Eye of Flame (2003)
- Thumbprints (2004)

Stories (Note: Short stories unless otherwise noted.)

Title	Year	First published	Reprinted/collected	Notes
The summer's dust	1981	Sargent, Pamela (July 1981). "The summer's dust". F&SF. 61 (1): 68–97.		Novelette

=== Anthologies edited ===
Women of Wonder series

- Women of Wonder (1975)
- More Women of Wonder (1976)
- The New Women of Wonder (1978)
- Women of Wonder: The Classic Years (1996)
- Women of Wonder: The Contemporary Years (1996)

Nebula Award anthologies

- Nebula Awards 29 (1995)
- Nebula Awards 30 (1996)
- Nebula Awards 31 (1997)

Other

- Bio-Futures: Science Fiction Stories About Biological Metamorphosis (1976)
- Three in Space (1981) with Jack Dann and George Zebrowski
- Afterlives (1986) with Ian Watson
- Three in Time (1997) with Jack Dann and George Zebrowski
- Conqueror Fantastic (2004)

=== Nonfiction ===
- Firebrands: The Heroines of Science Fiction and Fantasy (1976) with Ron Miller

———————

Bibliography notes

== Awards ==
In 1993, Pamela Sargent won the Nebula Award for Best Novelette published in 1992, for "Danny Goes to Mars". This novelette originally appeared in Asimov's magazine in October 1992.

In 2012, Sargent won the Pilgrim Award for lifetime contributions to SF/F studies.
