= Josephine Saxton =

British writer

Josephine Mary Howard Saxton (born 11 June 1935) is an English feminist science fiction writer.

== Early life ==
Josephine Mary Howard was born in Halifax, West Yorkshire.

== Career ==
Her first short story, "The Wall", was published in the November 1965 issue of Science Fantasy. In 1969 her first novel, The Hieros Gamos of Sam and An Smith, was published by Doubleday, followed by Vector for Seven (1970) and Group Feast (1971).

After publishing more short stories over the next several years, in 1980 her fourth novel The Travails of Jane Saint was published, followed by Queen of the States in 1986. Queen of the States was nominated for both the Arthur C. Clarke Award and the BSFA Award for Best Novel.

She was awarded the Cordwainer Smith Rediscovery Award in 2023.

== Bibliography ==
=== Novels ===
- The Hieros Gamos of Sam and An Smith (Doubleday, 1969)
- Vector for Seven (Doubleday, 1970)
- Group Feast (Doubleday, 1971)
- The Travails of Jane Saint (Virgin Books, 1980)
- Queen of the States (Women's Press, 1986)

=== Collections ===
- The Power of Time (Chatto & Windus, 1985)
- Little Tours of Hell: Tall Tales of Food and Holidays (Pandora Press, 1986)
- The Travails of Jane Saint and Other Stories (Women's Press, 1986)
- The Consciousness Machine / Jane Saint and the Backlash: The Further Travails of Jane Saint (Women's Press, 1989)

=== In anthologies ===
- "Ne déjà vu pas" in England Swings SF (1968)
- "Nature Boy" in Quark/3 (1971)
- "The Power of Time" in New Dimensions 1 (1971)
- "Elouise and the Doctors of the Planet Pergamon" in Again, Dangerous Visions (1972)
- "The Triumphant Head" in The New Women of Wonder (1978)
- "The Snake Who Had Read Chomsky" in Universe 11 (1981)
- "The Wall" in The Penguin Book of Modern Fantasy by Women (1995)
