= Joan D. Vinge =

American science fiction author (born 1948)

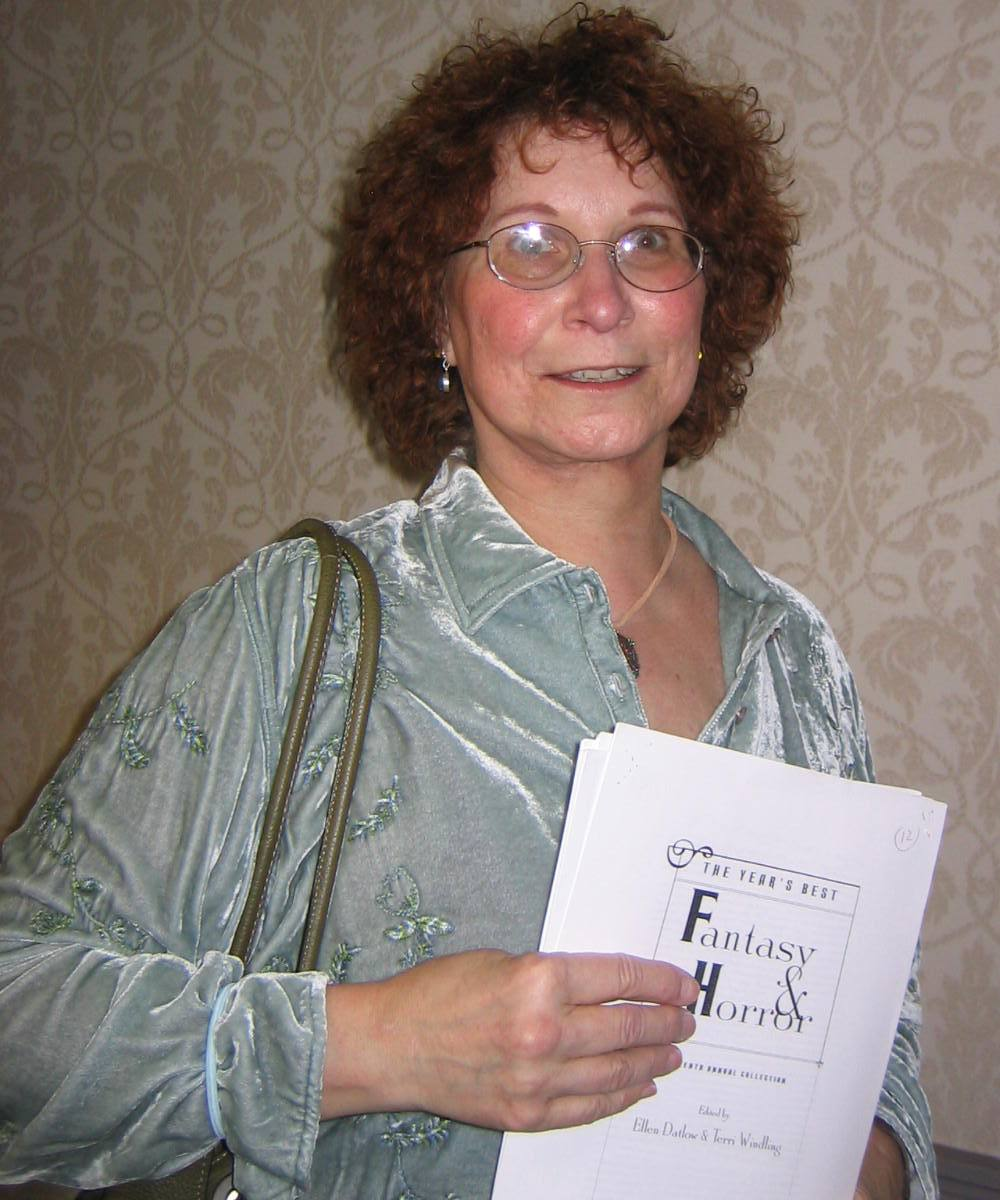
- Joan D. Vinge in 2005
- Born: April 2, 1948 (age 78); Baltimore, Maryland, U.S.
- Education: San Diego State University (BA)
- Occupation: Novelist
- Spouses: Vernor Vinge (m. 1972; div. 1979) James Frenkel (m. 1980)
- Writing career
- Genre: Science fiction
- Notable works: The Snow Queen, The Cat Novels

Joan D. Vinge (/ˈvɪndʒi/; born April 2, 1948, as Joan Carol Dennison) is an American science fiction author. She is known for her Hugo Award–winning novel The Snow Queen (1980) and its sequels, her series about a telepath named Cat, and her Heaven's Chronicles books. She also is the author of The Random House Book of Greek Myths (1999).

== Biography ==
Vinge studied art in college, but eventually changed to a major in anthropology, and received a B.A. degree from San Diego State University in 1971.

Vinge has been married twice: first to fellow science fiction author Vernor Vinge from 1972 to 1979, and currently to science fiction editor James Frenkel since 1980. Vinge and Frenkel have two children, and live in Chapel Hill, North Carolina. She has taught at the Clarion Workshop several times, both East and West.

Robert A. Heinlein dedicated his 1982 novel Friday in part to Joan.

On March 2, 2002, Vinge was severely injured in a car accident that left her with "minor but debilitating" brain damage that, along with her fibromyalgia, left her unable to write. She recovered to the point of being able to resume writing around the beginning of 2007, and her first new book after the accident was the 2011 novelization of the movie Cowboys & Aliens.

== Works ==
Vinge's first published story, "Tin Soldier", a novella, appeared in Orbit 14 in 1974. Her stories have also appeared in Analog, Millennial Women, Asimov's Science Fiction, and several "Best of the Year" anthologies.

Several of her stories have won major awards: Her novel The Snow Queen won the 1981 Hugo Award for Best Novel. "Eyes of Amber" won the 1977 Hugo Award for Best Novelette. She has also been nominated for several other Hugo and Nebula Awards, as well as for the John W. Campbell Award for Best New Writer. Her novel Psion was named a Best Book for Young Adults by the American Library Association.

== Bibliography ==
=== Heaven Chronicles ===
- The Outcasts of Heaven Belt (1978)
- The Heaven Chronicles (1991) (contains The Outcasts of Heaven Belt and related novella "Legacy")

According to the author, the stories are linked to Vernor Vinge's "Zones of Thought". The Outcasts are based on Vernor's notes and his partial co-authorship.

=== The Snow Queen Cycle ===
- The Snow Queen (1980)
- World's End (1984)
- The Summer Queen (1991)
- Tangled Up In Blue (2000)

=== Cat ===
- "Psiren" (1980, published as chapbook, reprinted in Phoenix in the Ashes and 2007 printing of Psion)
- Psion (1982, expanded version published 2007)
- Catspaw (1988)
- Alien Blood (1988, omnibus of Psion and Catspaw)
- Dreamfall (1996)

=== Collections ===
- Fireship / Mother and Child (1978) - single-volume collection of two novellas.
- Eyes of Amber (1979)
- Phoenix in the Ashes (1985)

=== Media novelizations and tie-ins ===
- Star Wars: Return of the Jedi – The Storybook Based on the Movie (1983)
- Tarzan, King of the Apes (1983)
- The Dune Storybook (1984)
- Return to Oz (1985)
- Mad Max Beyond Thunderdome (1985)
- Santa Claus: The Movie (1985)
- Santa Claus: The Movie Storybook (1985)
- Ladyhawke (1987)
- Willow (1988)
- Lost in Space (1998)
- Cowboys & Aliens (2011) (Winner of the 2012 Scribe Award for Best Adapted Novel}
- 47 Ronin (2013)

=== Short fiction ===
- "Tin Soldier" (1974)
- "Mother and Child" (1975)
- "The Peddler's Apprentice" (with Vernor Vinge) (1975)
- "The Crystal Ship" (1976)
- "To Bell the Cat" (1977)
- "Eyes of Amber" (1977)
- "View from a Height" (1978)
- "Phoenix in the Ashes" (1978)
- "Fireship" (1978)
- "Psiren" (1980)
- "The Storm King" (1980)
- "Voices from the Dust" (1980)
- "The Hunt of the Unicorn" (1980)
- "Exorcycle" (1982)
- "Golden Girl and the Guardians of the Gemstones" (as by Billie Randall) (1985)
- "Tam Lin" (1985)
- "Latter-Day Martian Chronicles" (1990)
- "Murphy's Cat" (2000)

=== Poetry ===
- "Phoenix" (1978)
- "Sun and Chimes Dropping" (1978)
- "Alien Lover" (1980)
- "There Are Songs" (1980)
