= Carol Emshwiller =

American novelist

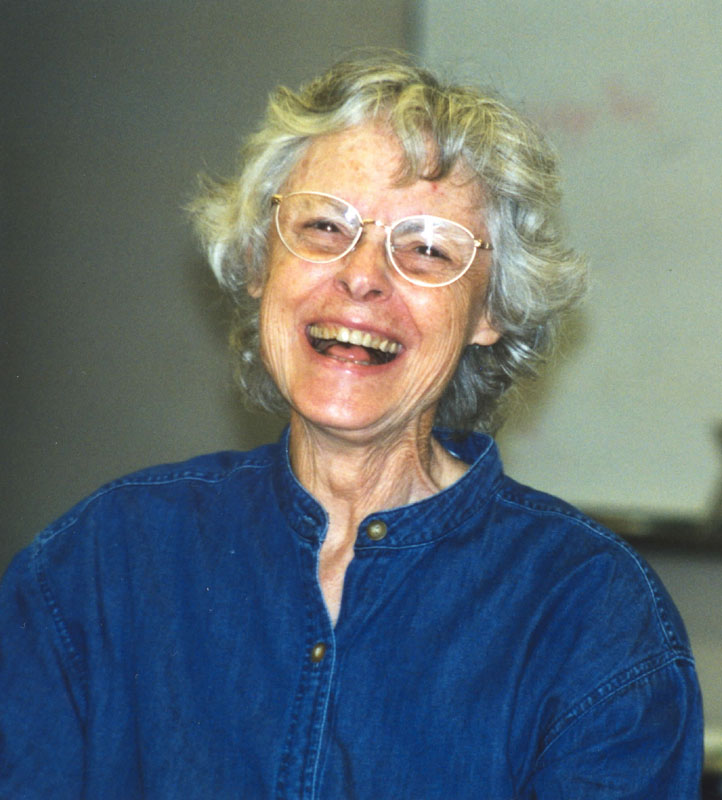
- Carol Emshwiller, 1998
- Born: Carol Fries; April 12, 1921; Ann Arbor, Michigan, U.S.
- Died: February 2, 2019 (aged 97); Durham, North Carolina, U.S.
- Education: University of Michigan
- Occupation: Writer
- Writing career
- Genres: science fiction, magical realism

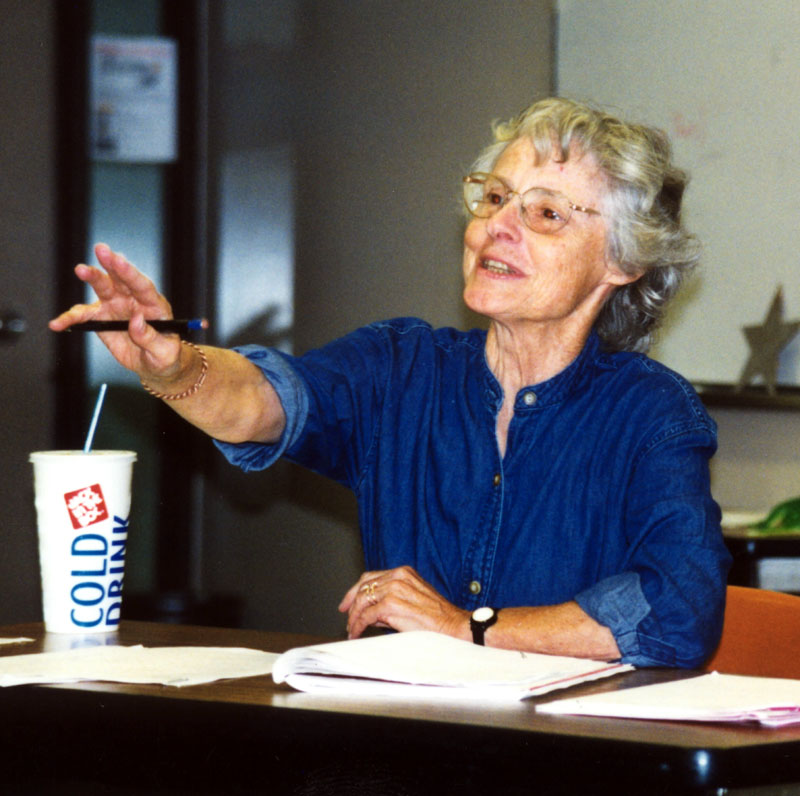
Teaching at Clarion West, 1998.

Carol Emshwiller (April 12, 1921 – February 2, 2019) was an American writer of avant-garde short stories and science fiction. She won prizes for her work including the Nebula Award and the Philip K. Dick Award. Ursula K. Le Guin has called her "a major fabulist, a marvelous magical realist, one of the strongest, most complex, most consistently feminist voices in fiction." Among her novels are Carmen Dog and The Mount. She also wrote two cowboy novels, Ledoyt and Leaping Man Hill. Her last novel, The Secret City, was published in April 2007.

She was married to the artist and experimental filmmaker Ed Emshwiller and "regularly served as his model for paintings of beautiful women." The couple had three children: Eve Emshwiller, a botanist and ethnobotanist at the University of Wisconsin–Madison; Susan Emshwiller, author and co-screenwriter of the movie Pollock; and Peter Emshwiller, an actor, artist, screenwriter, and novelist.

== Biography ==
Emshwiller was born Agnes Carolyn Fries in Ann Arbor, Michigan. She spent part of her childhood in France and Germany for her father's academic sabbaticals. After graduating with a B.A. in music from the University of Michigan in 1945, she joined the Red Cross to aid U.S. troops in postwar Italy. Returning to Ann Arbor, she attended art school and married Ed Emshwiller, a fellow art student, in 1949. The couple studied at the École Nationale Superiéure des Beaux-Arts, toured Europe on a motorcycle, and eventually settled in Levittown, New York.

In later years, she lived in New York City and taught at New York University. She spent summers in Owens Valley, California, a setting she often used in her stories.

She died on February 2, 2019, in Durham, North Carolina, where she was living with her daughter, Susan.

== Career ==
Emshwiller began publishing science fiction in the mid-1950s. Much of her early fiction appeared in The Magazine of Fantasy & Science Fiction and in Damon Knight’s Orbit anthologies. Her experimental stories were associated with the New Wave of science fiction.

Emshwiller’s stories appeared in The Magazine of Fantasy & Science Fiction, Ninth Letter, Century, Scifiction, Lady Churchill’s Rosebud Wristlet, TriQuarterly, Transatlantic Review, McSweeney’s, Orbit, Epoch, The Voice Literary Supplement, Omni, and many other anthologies and magazines.

Emshwiller was a MacDowell Colony Fellow and was awarded an NEA grant, a New York State Creative Artists Public Service grant, a New York State Foundation for the Arts grant, and the ACCENT/ASCENT fiction prize.

In 1991, she was awarded the World Fantasy Award—Collection for The Start of the End of It All and Other Stories. In 2005, she was awarded the World Fantasy Award for Life Achievement. Her short story "Creature" won the 2002 Nebula Award for Best Short Story, and "I Live With You" won the 2005 Nebula Award in the same category.

In 2009, she donated her archive to the department of Rare Books and Special Collections at Northern Illinois University.

== Bibliography ==
=== Novels ===
- Carmen Dog (The Women's Press, 1988; Mercury House, 1990)
- Ledoyt (Mercury House, 1995)
- Leaping Man Hill (Mercury House, 1999)
- The Mount (Small Beer Press, 2002)
- Mister Boots (Viking Juvenile, 2005)
- The Secret City (Tachyon Publications, 2007)

=== Short fiction ===
- Joy in Our Cause (Harper & Row, 1974)
- Verging on the Pertinent (Coffee House Press, 1989)
- The Start of the End of It All (The Women's Press/Mercury House, 1990). Winner of the World Fantasy Award, Best Collection
- Venus Rising (Edgewood Press, 1992)
- Report to the Men's Club and Other Stories (Small Beer Press, 2002)
- I Live With You (Tachyon Publications, 2005)
- In the Time of War and Other Stories of Conflict / Master of the Road to Nowhere and Other Tales of the Fantastic (P.S. Publishing, 2011) (omnibus edition)
- The Collected Stories of Carol Emshwiller (Nonstop Press, 2011)
- The Collected Stories of Carol Emshwiller: Vol. 2 (Nonstop Press, 2014)
- Moon Songs: The Selected Stories of Carol Emshwiller, ed. Matthew Cheney (Third Man Books, 2025)

== Awards and honors ==
- 1971: MacDowell Fellowship
- 1975: Creative Artists Public Service Grant
- 1979: National Endowment Grant
- 1988: New York State Grant
- 1988: Science Fiction Chronicle Readers Poll for "The Circular Library of Stones"
- 1991: World Fantasy Award for The Start of the End of It All and Other Stories
- 1999: Gallun Award for her body of work
- 2003: Nebula Award for "Creature"
- 2003: Philip K. Dick Award for The Mount
- 2005: World Fantasy Award—Life Achievement
- 2006: Nebula Award for "I Live With You"
- 2008: Sense of Gender Award for Carmen Dog
- 2011: Asimov’s Science Fiction Magazine Readers’ Award for "The Lovely Ugly"
