= Point Blank (publisher) =

- Industry: Publishing
- Founded: 2004; 21 years ago
- Founder: J. T. Lindroos; John Gregory Betancourt

Point Blank is an imprint of Wildside Press, founded in early 2004 by J. T. Lindroos and John Gregory Betancourt. Allan Guthrie and Kathleen Martin have worked with the company from its beginning in various editorial roles. Point Blank publishes mostly hard boiled crime fiction, both original novels and classic reprints. Its inaugural publication was Two-Way Split, the first novel by Allan Guthrie, followed by novels and short story collections from James Reasoner, James Sallis, Gary Phillips, O'Neil De Noux, Ed Lynskey, and many others.

Point Blank published the first novels of Allan Guthrie, Donna Moore, Ray Banks, Dave Zeltserman and Duane Swierczynski. It received high praise from Ken Bruen in its first year.

Although based in North America, Point Blank publishes novels from UK authors such as Ray Banks and Donna Moore as well as Australians Damien Broderick and Rory Barnes.

Point Blank has released occasional cinema titles, including The DVD Savant by Glenn Erickson and The Complete Guide to Low-Budget Feature Filmmaking by filmmaker Josh Becker.

== Prizes and awards ==
- 2007 Lefty Award for Best Humorous Mystery (winner): ...Go To Helena Handbasket by Donna Moore
- 2007 Theakston's Old Peculier Crime Novel of the Year Award (winner): Two-Way Split by Allan Guthrie
