= Henry Slesar =

American writer (1927–2002)

- Slesar c. 1959
- Born: June 12, 1927; New York City, U.S.
- Died: April 2, 2002 (aged 74); New York City, U.S.
- Spouses: Oenone Scott (m. 1953; div. 1969); Jan Maakestad (m. 1970; div. 1974); Manuela Jone (m. 1974)
- Children: 2
- Writing career
- Pen name: O. H. Leslie; Clyde Mitchell; Jay Street.
- Years active: 1955–2001
- Genres: Dark fantasy; Detective fiction; Science fiction; Mysteries; Thrillers

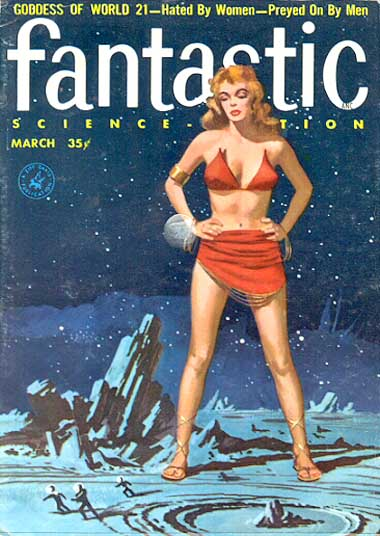
Slesar's novella "The Goddess of World 21" was cover-featured on the March 1957 issue of Fantastic Science Fiction

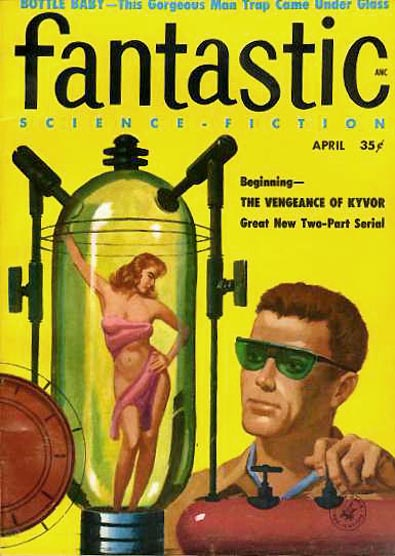
The next month, his novelette "Bottle Baby" also took the cover of Fantastic

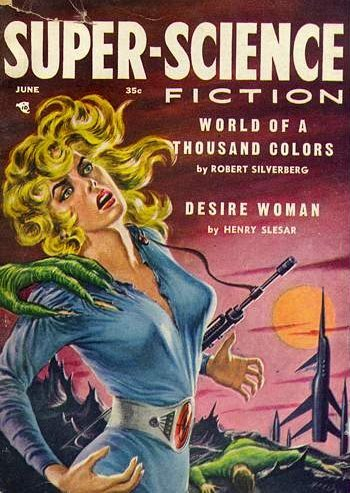
Slesar's short story "Desire Woman" was cover-featured on the June 1957 issue of Super-Science Fiction

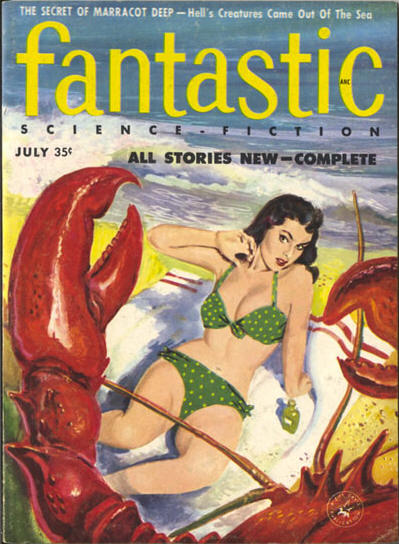
Slesar's novella "The Secret of Marracott Deep" was the cover story of the July 1957 issue of Fantastic

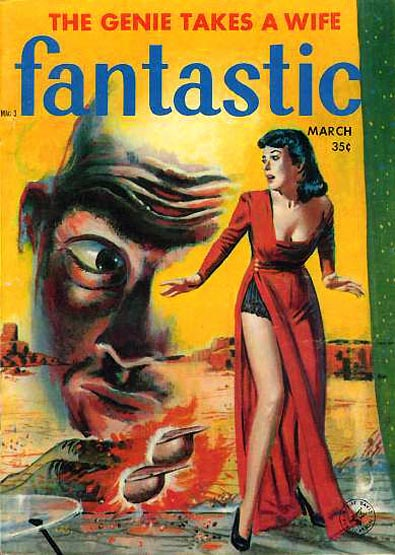
Slesar's novelette "The Genie Takes a Wife" was cover-featured on the March 1958 issue of Fantastic

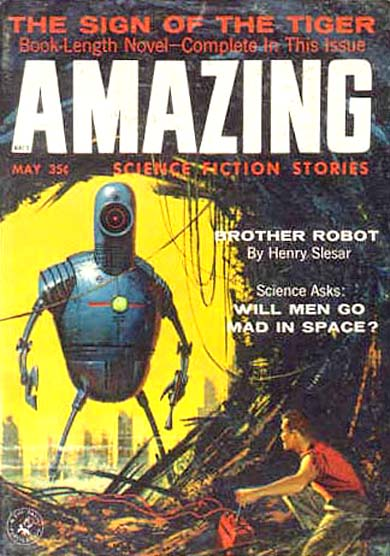
Slesar's novella "Brother Robot" was cover-featured on the May 1958 issue of Amazing Stories

Henry Slesar (June 12, 1927 – April 2, 2002) was an American author and playwright. He is famous for his use of irony and twist endings. After reading Slesar's "M Is for the Many" in Ellery Queen's Mystery Magazine, Alfred Hitchcock bought it for adaptation and they began many successful collaborations. Slesar wrote hundreds of scripts for television series and soap operas, leading TV Guide to call him "the writer with the largest audience in America."

== Life ==
Henry Slesar was born in Brooklyn, New York City. His parents were Jewish immigrants from Ukraine, and he had two sisters named Doris and Lillian. After graduating from the School of Industrial Art, he found he had a talent for ad copy and design, which launched his twenty-year career as a copywriter at the age of 17. He was hired right out of school to work for the prominent advertising agency Young & Rubicam.

It has been claimed that the term "coffee break" was coined by Slesar and that he was also the person behind McGraw-Hill's massively popular "The Man in the Chair" advertising campaign.

After World War II, Slesar served in the United States Army Air Force, which influenced his story "The Delegate from Venus". Afterwards, he opened his own agency.

Slesar was married three times: to Oenone Scott, 1953–1969; to Jan Maakestad, 1970–1974; and to Manuela Jone in 1974. He had one daughter and one son.

== Pseudonyms ==
In addition to writing chiefly under his own name, Slesar published under several pseudonyms, particularly on early short stories. These included:

- Clyde Mitchell – a Ziff Davis "house pseudonym" used by some science fiction and fantasy authors in Amazing Stories and Fantastic, which were edited by Paul W. Fairman. (Authors publishing as Clyde Mitchell include Robert Silverberg, Randall Garrett, Harlan Ellison, and others.) Slesar used the Mitchell name for "The Monster Died at Dawn" in Amazing Stories (November, 1956), and "A Kiss for the Conqueror" in Fantastic (February, 1957).
- O. H. Leslie – Slesar chose this name, which he used from 1956 to 1964, again for Paul Fairman as well as other magazines.

In Amazing Stories he published such stories as "Marriages Are Made in Detroit" (December 1956), "Reluctant Genius" (January 1957), "No Room in Heaven" (June 1957), "The Anonymous Man" (July 1957), and "The Seven Eyes of Jonathan Dark" (January 1959).
In Fantastic he published such stories as "Death Rattle" (December 1956), "My Robot" (February 1957), "Abe Lincoln—Android" (April 1957), "The Marriage Machine" (July 1957), and "Inheritance" (August 1957).

- Ivar Jorgensen – This pseudonym, a house name, was also used by Robert Silverberg, Randall Garrett, Harlan Ellison, Howard Browne, and Paul Fairman himself. Slesar's use of the name appeared in Fantastic for "Coward's Death" (December 1956) and "Tailor-Made Killers" (August 1957).
- E. K. Jarvis – another Ziff Davis house name, also used by Robert Silverberg, Harlan Ellison, Paul W. Fairman, Robert Bloch, and Robert Moore Williams. Slesar used it for "Get Out of Our Skies!" in Amazing Stories (December 1957).
- Lawrence Chandler – Another Ziff Davis house name, shared by Howard Browne, Slesar used it for "Tool of the Gods" in Fantastic (November 1957).
- Sley Harson – Nearly an anagram of Slesar's name, he used it in collaboration with his friend Harlan Ellison. Together they published "Sob Story" in The Deadly Streets (Ace Books, 1958).
- Gerald Vance – Another Ziff Davis house name; shared by William P. McGivern, Rog Phillips, Robert Silverberg and Randall Garrett. Slesar sold the story "The Lavender Talent" to Paul Fairman at Fantastic (March 1958).
- Jeff Heller – A pen name he used when collaborating with his friend, M*A*S*H writer Jay Folb.
- Eli Jerome - A pen name derived from the first names of his two brothers-in-law, the husbands of his sister Doris Greenberg and his sister Lillian Gleich. Used in various stories in Alfred Hitchcock collections and 2 teleplays on Alfred Hitchcock Presents ("Party Line" and "One Grave Too Many", both 1960).

Other house names Slesar employed were Jay Street, John Murray, and Lee Saber.

After 1958, he wrote chiefly under his own name.

== Career ==
In 1955, he published his first short story, "The Brat" (Imaginative Tales, September, 1955). While working as a copywriter, he published hundreds of short stories—over forty in 1957 alone—including detective fiction, science fiction, criminal stories, mysteries, and thrillers in such publications as Playboy, Imaginative Tales, and Alfred Hitchcock's Mystery Magazine; he was writing, on average, one story per week. Alfred Hitchcock hired him to write a number of the scenarios for Alfred Hitchcock Presents. Two of his stories were adapted for the fifth season (1963–64) of Rod Serling's original Twilight Zone series, though Slesar did not write the teleplays. Much later, Slesar's short story "Examination Day" was used in the 1980s Twilight Zone revival.

His first novel-length work was 20 Million Miles to Earth, a 1957 novelization of the film. In 1960, his first novel, The Gray Flannel Shroud (1958), a murder mystery set in an advertising agency, earned the Edgar Allan Poe Award.

Perhaps his most often-recurring character was the wannabe criminal Ruby Martinson, who starred in fourteen Hitchcock's stories between 1957 and 1968. These comedic jaunts, in which Martinson and the narrator—his weak-willed, chronically unemployed cousin Joey—would inevitably attempt an overambitious crime and never successfully profit, were especially popular in Germany and Japan, inspiring respectively the television series Parole Chicago and the film Kaitō Ruby.

Domestically, Slesar also adapted one of his Amazing Science Fiction stories, "Legacy of Terror," for the screenplay of the 1965 film Two on a Guillotine.

In 1974, he won an Emmy Award as the head writer for CBS Daytime's The Edge of Night. His term as head writer (1968–84) was considered lengthy. Chris Schemering writes in The Soap Opera Encyclopedia, "Slesar proved a master of the serial format, creating a series of bizarre, intricate plots of offbeat characters in the spirit of the irreverent detective movies of the '40s." During that time, he was also head writer for the Procter & Gamble soap operas Somerset (on NBC Daytime) and Search for Tomorrow until John William Corrington replaced him on the latter. During the 1974–75 television season, he was the creator and head writer for Executive Suite, a CBS primetime series.

He wrote mainly science-fiction scripts for the CBS Radio Mystery Theater during the 1970s.

In 1983, Procter & Gamble wanted to replace him as the head writer for The Edge of Night, but ABC/ABC Daytime kept him. After his eventual replacement as head writer by Lee Sheldon, the network named him and Sam Hall the new head writers of its soap opera One Life to Live, but he left that show after only one year. He was later the head writer of the CBS Daytime series Capitol.

His last novel was Murder at Heartbreak Hospital (ISBN 0-897-33463-9). It is based on his experiences as a writer for soaps. A homicide detective investigates murders on the set of a soap opera and meets a variety of amusing characters, including the bland leading man, a rapacious starlet, a couple of gay teleplay writers, and some executives. As so many of his works did, it features a twist ending. It was originally published in Europe in 1990 and the American version retains British spellings and some errors (possibly Slesar's, as when the detective's name is wrongly given in chapter three). The novel was adapted into a film, Heartbreak Hospital, by Ruedi Gerber in 2002; it starred John Shea as Milo, the leading man, Diane Venora as his wife, and Patricia Clarkson as Lottie.

Other late works included "interactive mystery serial" stories for MysteryNet.com, which invited readers to contribute their ideas.

== Bibliography ==
=== Novels ===
- The Gray Flannel Shroud. New York: Random House, 1959. (Series: A Random House mystery)
- Enter Murderers. New York: Random House, 1960. (Series: A Random House mystery)
- The Bridge of Lions. New York: Macmillan, 1963.
- The Thing at the Door. New York: Random House, 1974. (ISBN 0-394-49007-X)
- Murder at Heartbreak Hospital. Chicago, Ill.: Academy Chicago Publishers, 1998.

=== Short fiction ===
Collections

- Clean Crimes and Neat Murders: Alfred Hitchcock's Hand Picked Selection of Stories by Henry Slesar. Introduction by Alfred Hitchcock. New York: Avon, 1960.

Cover title: A Bouquet of Clean Crimes and Neat Murders.
Spine title: Alfred Hitchcock Presents Clean Crimes and Neat Murders.

- A Crime for Mothers and Others. New York, N.Y.: Avon, 1962.
- Murders Most Macabre. New York, N.Y.: Avon, 1986. (paperback; ISBN 0-380-89975-2)
- Death on Television: The Best of Henry Slesar's Alfred Hitchcock Stories. Edited by Francis M. Nevins Jr. and Martin H. Greenberg. Introduction by Henry Slesar. Carbondale: Southern Illinois University Press, 1989. (ISBN 0-809-31500-9)

Stories

Title	Year	First published	Reprinted/collected	Notes
Deuce	1991			
Examination Day	1985			
The dinner party	2001	"The dinner party". F&SF. 100 (1): 59–65. January 2001.		
The museum	2000	Slesar, Henry (March 2000). "The museum". F&SF. 98 (3): 128–140.		

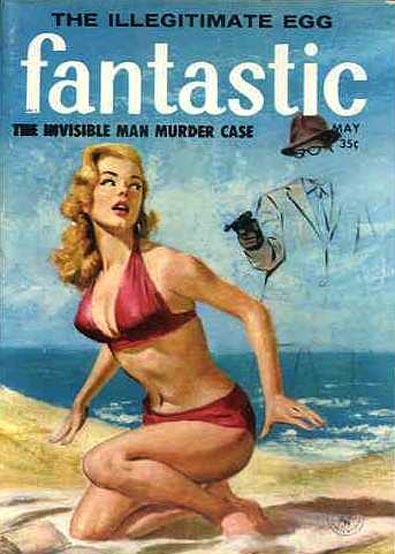
Slesar's novelette "The Invisible Man Murder Case" took the cover of the May 1958 issue of Fantastic

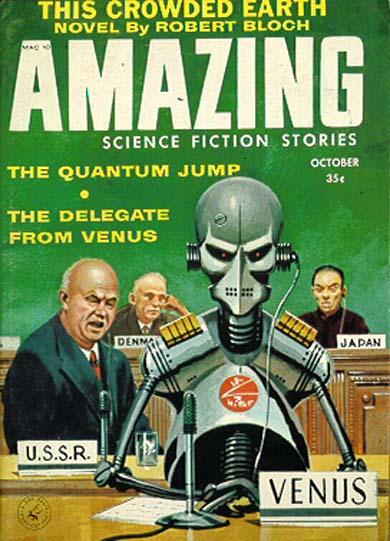
Slesar's "The Delegate from Venus" was the cover story of the October 1958 issue of Amazing Stories

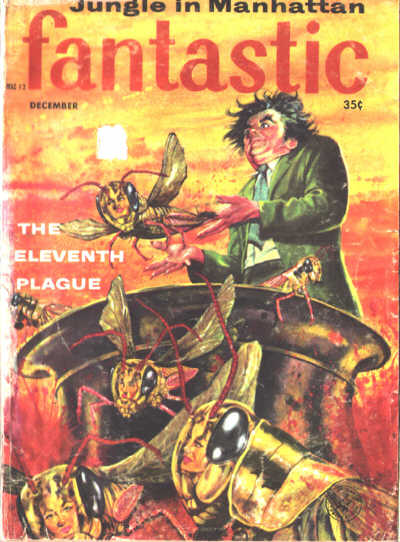
Slesar's novelette "The Eleventh Plague" took the cover of the December 1958 issue of Fantastic

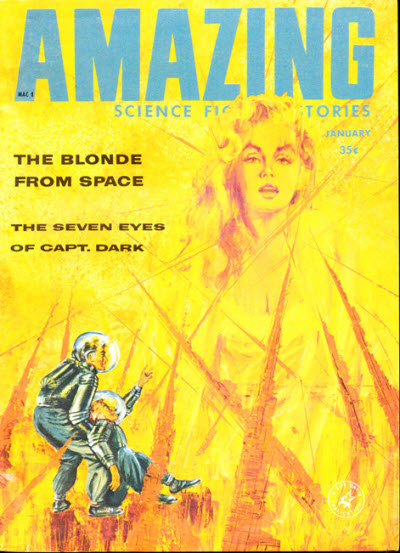
Slesar's "The Blonde from Space" was the cover story of the January 1959 issue of Amazing Stories

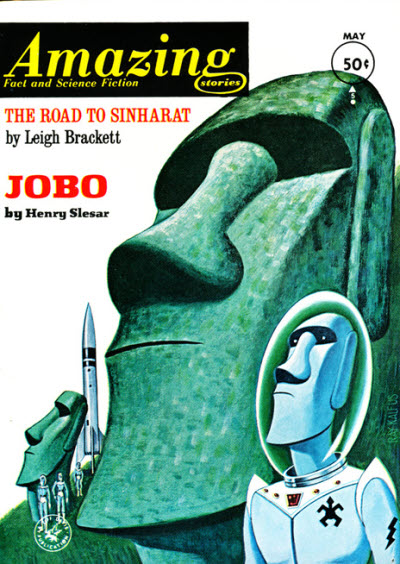
Slesar's novella "Jobo" took the cover of the May 1963 issue of Amazing Stories

- "A Cry from the Penthouse" (1959) – Originally published in Playboy, November, 1959. Anthologized in: Alfred Hitchcock Presents Stories for Late at Night, 1961 and AHP: More Stories for Late at Night, 1962.
- "A God Named Smith" (1957) – Originally published in Amazing Stories, July, 1957. Later collected with Worlds of the Imperium, by Keith Laumer, as Armchair Fiction Double Novel #51, 2012, ISBN 978-1-61287-078-6.
- "Abe Lincoln – Android" (1957) – As by O. H. Leslie. Originally published in Fantastic, April, 1957. Anthologized in: Great Science Fiction, No. 6, 1967.
- "Bats" (1989) – The Further Adventures of Batman, 1989, ed. Martin H. Greenberg, ISBN 0-553-28270-0.
- "Before the Talent Dies" (1957) – Originally published in Venture Science Fiction, September, 1957. Anthologized in: No Limits, 1964, ed. Joseph W. Ferman; and in Supermen, 1984, ed. Isaac Asimov, Martin H. Greenberg, Charles G. Waugh, ISBN 0-451-13201-7.
- "Behind the Screen" (1993) – The Further Adventures of Wonder Woman, 1993, ed. Martin H. Greenberg, ISBN 0-553-28624-2.
- "Brother Robot" (1958) – Originally published in Amazing Science Fiction Stories, May, 1958. Anthologized in: Uncollected Stars, 1986, ed. Piers Anthony, Barry N. Malzberg, Martin H. Greenberg, Charles G. Waugh, ISBN 0-380-89596-X; and in Robots, 1989, ed. Charles G. Waugh, Isaac Asimov, Martin H. Greenberg, ISBN 0-451-15926-8.
- "Chief" (1960) – The 6th Annual of the Year's Best S-F, 1961, ed. Judith Merril; 100 Great Science Fiction Short Short Stories, 1980, ed. Isaac Asimov, Martin Greenberg, Joseph D. Olander, ISBN 0-380-50773-0; and others.
- "Cop for a Day" (1957) – Originally published in Manhunt, January 1957. Anthologized in: The Young Oxford Book of Nasty Endings, 1997, ed. Dennis Pepper, ISBN 0-19-278151-0.
- Slesar, Henry (January 1957). "Dream Town". Project Gutenberg EBook.
- "Ersatz" (1967) – Dangerous Visions, 1967, ed. Harlan Ellison.
- "Examination Day" (1958) – Originally published in Playboy, February 1958. Frequently anthologized; some include School and Society Through Science Fiction, 1974, ed. Patricia Warrick, Martin H. Greenberg, Joseph D. Olander, ISBN 0-528-61240-9; Inside Information: Computers in Fiction, edited by Abbe Mowshowitz; Beyond Time and Space, 1978, ed. Robert R. Potter, ISBN 0-87065-155-2; Realms of Darkness, 1985, ed. Mary Danby, ISBN 0-86273-244-1; New Stories from the Twilight Zone, 1993, ed. Martin H. Greenberg, ISBN 0-7515-0329-0; 100 Hair Raising Little Horror Stories, 1993, ed. Al Sarrantonio, Martin H. Greenberg, ISBN 1-56619-056-8; and Beware!: R. L. Stine Picks His Favorite Scary Stories, 2002, ed. R. L. Stine, ISBN 0-06-623842-0.
- "40 Detectives Later" – in 100 Menacing Little Murder Stories, 1998, ed. Robert Weinberg, Stefan Dziemianowicz, Martin H. Greenberg, ISBN 0-7607-0854-1.
- Slesar, Henry (January 1957). "Heart". Project Gutenberg EBook.
- "I Now Pronounce You Superman and Wife" (1993) The Further Adventures of Superman, 1993, ed. Martin H. Greenberg, ISBN 0-553-28568-8.
- "Job Offer" (1959) – Originally published in Satellite Science Fiction, April, 1959. Anthologized in: 101 Science Fiction Stories, 1986, ed. Martin H. Greenberg, Charles G. Waugh, Jenny-Lynn Waugh, ISBN 0-517-60669-0.
- "Legacy of Terror" (1958) – Originally published in Amazing Science Fiction Stories, November, 1958. Anthologized in: Satan's Pets, 1972, ed. Vic Ghidalia.
- "Lost Dog" (1958) – Originally published in Mike Shayne Mystery Magazine, February, 1958. Anthologized in: Alfred Hitchcock Presents: Stories My Mother Never Told Me, 1963, ed. Alfred Hitchcock.
- "Murder Delayed" (1962) – Games Killers Play, 1968, ed. Alfred Hitchcock.
- "My Father, The Cat" (1957) – Originally published in Fantastic Universe, December, 1957. Anthologized in: Supernatural Cats, 1972, ed. Claire Necker, ISBN 0-385-07561-8; in Magicats!, 1984, ed. Jack Dann, Gardner Dozois, ISBN 0-441-51530-4; and in Isaac Asimov's Magical Worlds of Fantasy: Faeries, edited by Isaac Asimov, Martin H. Greenberg, and Charles G. Waugh. New York: Roc, 1991. (ISBN 0-451-45061-2); and others.
- "My Mother the Ghost" (1965) – Originally published in The Diners Club Magazine, 1965. Anthologized in: Tricks and Treats, 1976, ed. Joe Gores, Bill Pronzini, ISBN 0-385-11416-8.
- "Personal Interview" (1957) – Originally published in Ellery Queen's Mystery Magazine Including Black Mask Magazine, December 1957.
- "Prez" (1982) – Terrors, 1982, ed. Charles L. Grant, ISBN 0-86721-138-5.
- "Speak" (1965) – First published in The Diners Club Magazine, 1965. Anthologized in: Microcosmic Tales; Weird Tales, 1996, ed. Marvin Kaye, Saralee Kaye, ISBN 0-7607-0118-0.
- "The Candidate" (1961) – Originally published in Rogue, 1961. Anthologized in: The Fiend in You, 1962, ed. Charles Beaumont; Alfred Hitchcock Presents: Stories That Scared Even Me, 1967, ed. Alfred Hitchcock, ISBN 0-370-00643-7; The Arbor House Necropolis, 1981, Bill Pronzini, ISBN 0-87795-338-4; Isaac Asimov's Magical Worlds of Fantasy # 4: Spells, 1985, ed. Isaac Asimov, Martin H. Greenberg, Charles G. Waugh, ISBN 0-451-13578-4; The Young Oxford Book of Nasty Endings, 1997, ed. Dennis Pepper, ISBN 0-19-278151-0; and others.
- "The Fifty-third Card" (1990) – The Further Adventures of The Joker, 1990, ed. Martin H. Greenberg, ISBN 0-553-28531-9.
- "The Girl Who Found Things" (1973) – Originally published in Alfred Hitchcock's Mystery Magazine, July 1973. Anthologized in: Alfred Hitchcock's Fatal Attractions, 1983, ed. Elana Lore, ISBN 0-385-27914-0, and in Tales of the Occult, (989, ed. Isaac Asimov, Martin H. Greenberg, Charles G. Waugh, ISBN 0-87975-506-7.
- "The Goddess of World 21" (1957) – Originally published in Fantastic, March, 1957. Later in The Most Thrilling Science Fiction Ever Told No. 11, Winter 1968.
- "The Haunted Man" (1974) – Twisters, (981, ed. Steve Bowles, ISBN 0-00-671798-5.
- "The Invisible Man Murder Case" (1958) – Originally published in Fantastic, May 1958. Anthologized in: Invisible Men, 1960, ed. Basil Davenport; and in The Seven Deadly Sins of Science Fiction, 1981, ed. Isaac Asimov, Martin H. Greenberg, Charles G. Waugh.
- "The Jam" (1958) – Originally published in Playboy, November, 1958. Frequently anthologized; some include Something Strange, 1969, ed. Marjorie B. Smiley, Mary Delores Jarmon, Domenica Paterno; The Supernatural In Fiction, 1973, ed. Leo P. Kelley, ISBN 0-07-033497-8; The Arbor House Treasury of Horror and the Supernatural, 1981, ed. Martin H. Greenberg, Bill Pronzini, Barry N. Malzberg, ISBN 0-87795-349-X; Classic Tales of Horror and the Supernatural, 1991, ed. Barry N. Malzberg, Martin H. Greenberg, Bill Pronzini, ISBN 0-688-10963-2; and others.
- "The Knocking in the Castle" (1964) – Originally published in Fantastic Stories of Imagination, November, 1964. Anthologized in: The Hell of Mirrors, 1965, ed. Peter Haining.
- "The Mad Killer" (1957) – Originally published in Ellery Queen's Mystery Magazine Including Black Mask Magazine, June 1957.
- "The Movie-Makers" (1956) – Originally published in Fantastic Universe, July, 1956. Anthologized in: Hollywood Unreel, 1982, ed. Charles Waugh, Martin H. Greenberg, ISBN 0-8008-3197-7.
- "The Moving Finger Types" (1968) – Originally published in The Magazine of Fantasy and Science Fiction, September, 1968. Anthologized in: Don't Open This Book!, 1998, ed. Marvin Kaye, ISBN 1-56865-524-X.
- "The Old Man" (1962) – Microcosmic Tales, 1980, ed. Joseph D. Olander, Martin H. Greenberg, Isaac Asimov, ISBN 0-8008-5238-9; The Twilight Zone: The Original Stories, 1985, ed. Martin H. Greenberg, Richard Matheson, Charles G. Waugh, ISBN 1-56731-065-6.
- "The Phantom of the Soap Opera" (1989) – Phantoms, 1989, ed. Rosalind M. Greenberg, Martin H. Greenberg, (DAW Collectors #778), ISBN 0-88677-348-2.
- "The Return of the Moresbys" (1964) – Haunted America: Star-Spangled Supernatural Stories, 1991, ed. Marvin Kaye.
- "The Right Kind of House" (1957) – Originally published in Haunted Houses: The Greatest Stories, 1997, ed. Martin H. Greenberg, ISBN 1-56731-168-7. Anthologized in: 100 Menacing Little Murder Stories, 1998, ed. Robert Weinberg, Stefan Dziemianowicz, Martin H. Greenberg, ISBN 0-7607-0854-1.
- "The Secret Formula" (1957) – Originally published in Playboy, October, 1957.
- "The Secret of Marracott Deep" (1957) – Originally published in Fantastic, July, 1957. Later collected with Pawn of the Black Fleet, by Mark Clifton, as Armchair Fiction Double Novel #9, 2011, ISBN 978-1-61287-008-3.
- "The Self-Improvement of Salvadore Ross" (1961) – Originally published in The Magazine of Fantasy and Science Fiction, May, 1961. Anthologized in: The Twilight Zone: The Original Stories, 1985, ed. Martin H. Greenberg, Richard Matheson, Charles G. Waugh, ISBN 1-56731-065-6.
- "The Show Must Go On" (1957) – Originally published in Infinity Science Fiction, July 1957. Later anthologized in Science Fiction Gems, Volume One, 2011, (Armchair Fiction Gems #1), ISBN 978-1-61287-028-1.
- "The Stuff" (1961) — Originally published in Galaxy Science Fiction, August 1961.
- "The Success Machine" (1957) – Originally published in Amazing Stories, September, 1957. Later appeared in Science Fiction Greats, Winter 1969, and in Fantastic, July, 1979.
- "Victory Parade" (1957) – Originally published in Playboy, April, 1957. Anthologized in: Science Fiction, 1975, ed. Sylvia Z. Brodkin, Elizabeth J. Pearson, ISBN 0-688-41723-X.
- "Who Am I?" (1956) – Originally published in Super-Science Fiction, December, 1956. Anthologized in: Tales from Super-Science Fiction, 2012, ed. Robert Silverberg, ISBN 978-1-893887-48-0.
- "Blackmailer" (1952) – Originally published in The Saint Mystery Magazine August 1952.
- "The Percent of Murder" (1958) - Originally published in Ellery Queen's Mystery Magazine September 1958.
- "Not The Running Type" (1959) – Originally published in Ellery Queen's Mystery Magazine January 1959.
- "The Horse That Was Not For Sale" (1964) – Originally published in Ellery Queen's Mystery Magazine May 1964
- "The Haunted Man" (1974) – Originally published in Ellery Queen's Mystery Magazine April 1974
- "The Memory Expert" (1974) – Originally published in Ellery Queen's Mystery Magazine August 1974
- "The Bottle" (1986) – Originally published in Ellery Queen's Mystery Magazine August 1986
- "Death in the First Edition" (1992) – Originally published by Waddington Games for the Clue Mystery Jigsaw Puzzle series
- "Whosit's Disease" (1962) – Originally published in Alfred Hitchcock's Mystery Magazine, October, 1962. Anthologized in: Beyond the Curtain of Dark, 1972, ed. Peter Haining, ISBN 0-450-01297-2.

=== Plays ===
- The Veil. Studio City, CA: Players Press, 1997. (ISBN 0887342612)

=== Radio plays ===
CBS radio mystery dramas (Numbers are show numbers)

- 0001 The Old Ones Are Hard to Kill
- 0002 The Return of the Moresbys
- 0004 Lost Dog
- 0014 The Girl Who Found Things
- 0015 The Chinaman Button
- 0019 Deadly Honeymoon
- 0021 The Ring of Truth
- 0032 After the Verdict
- 0045 The Horse That Wasn't for Sale
- 0047 A Choice of Witnesses
- 0058 Sea of Troubles
- 0070 The Locked Room
- 0071 The Murder Museum
- 0075 Men Without Mouths
- 0093 The Trouble with Ruth
- 0103 A Bargain in Blood
- 0110 Where Fear Begins
- 0126 The Hit Man
- 0134 The Final Vow
- 0135 The Hands of Mrs. Mallory
- 0138 The Case of M.J.H.
- 0149 Thicker than Water
- 0159 The Doll
- 0162 The Last escape
- 0169 Bury Me Again
- 0257 My Own Murder
- 0275 The Rise and Fall of the Fourth Reich
- 0303 The Slave
- 0329 Welcome for a Dead Man
- 0389 Promise to Kill
- 0429 You Owe Me a Death
- 0618 Jobo
- 0658 A God Named Smith
- 0663 The Night We Died
- 1038 The Movie Makers
- 1051 Prisoner of the Machines
- 1075 Kitty
- 1086 Two of a Kind
- 1089 The Bluff
- 1103 Murder Preferred
- 1136 The Eleventh Plague
- 1317 Shelter
- 1388 I Hate Harold

=== Teleplays ===
Most of the teleplays written for Alfred Hitchcock Presents were based on Slesar's own stories.

- "A Crime for Mothers", for Alfred Hitchcock Presents, January 24, 1961 (Season 6, Episode 16), starring Claire Trevor and Patricia Smith.
- "A Woman's Help", for Alfred Hitchcock Presents, March 28, 1961 (Season 6, Episode 24), starring Antoinette Bower.
- "Blood Bargain", for The Alfred Hitchcock Hour, October 25, 1963 (Season 2, Episode 5), starring Richard Kiley.
- "Burglar Proof", for Alfred Hitchcock Presents, February 27, 1962 (Season 7, Episode 21), starring Paul Hartman.
- "Cop for a Day", for Alfred Hitchcock Presents, October 31, 1961 (Season 7, Episode 4), starring Walter Matthau and Glenn Cannon.
- "Final Vow" for, The Alfred Hitchcock Hour, October 25, 1962 (Season 1, Episode 6), starring Carol Lynley.
- "I Saw the Whole Thing", for The Alfred Hitchcock Hour, October 11, 1962 (Season 1, Episode 4), starring John Forsythe.
- "Laurie Marie", for The Name of the Game, December 19, 1969 (Season 2, Episode 13); teleplay written with David P. Harmon.
- "Ma Parker", for Batman, October 6, 1966 (Season 2, Episode 10).
- "Most Likely to Succeed", for Alfred Hitchcock Presents, May 8, 1962 (Season 7, Episode 31).
- "The Greatest Mother of Them All", for Batman, October 5, 1966 (Season 2, Episode 9).
- "The Horse Player", for Alfred Hitchcock Presents, March 14, 1961 (Season 6, Episode 22), starring Claude Rains.
- "The Last Escape", for Alfred Hitchcock Presents, January 31, 1961 (Season 6, Episode 17), starring Keenan Wynn and Jan Sterling.
- "The Last Remains", for Alfred Hitchcock Presents, March 27, 1962 (Season 7, Episode 25), starring John Fiedler.
- "The Man in the Mirror", for 77 Sunset Strip, January 13, 1961 (Season 3, Episode 18).
- "The Man with Two Faces", for Alfred Hitchcock Presents, December 13, 1960 (Season 6, Episode 11), starring Spring Byington.
- "The Test", for Alfred Hitchcock Presents, February 20, 1962 (Season 7, Episode 20), starring Brian Keith and Rod Lauren.
- "The Throwback", for Alfred Hitchcock Presents, February 28, 1961 (Season 6, Episode 20), starring Murray Matheson.

=== Adaptations ===
- "A Cry from the Penthouse" – Originally published in Playboy, 1959. Adapted for Markham (Season 1, Episode 52), starring Ray Milland, Jack Weston and Willard Waterman.
- "Bottle Baby" – Originally published in Fantastic, 1957; adapted (uncredited) as the feature film Terror from the Year 5000 (1958).
- "The Day of the Execution" – Appeared in Alfred Hitchcock's Mystery Magazine Presents Fifty Years of Crime and Suspense. Adapted by Bernard C. Schoenfeld as "Night of the Execution" for Alfred Hitchcock Presents (Season 3, Episode 13), starring Pat Hingle.
- "Examination Day" – Originally published in Playboy, 1958. Adapted by Philip DeGuere for The Twilight Zone (Season 1, Episode 6), starring Christopher Allport, David Mendenhall, and Elizabeth Norment.
- "40 Detectives Later" – Adapted as Forty Detectives Later for Alfred Hitchcock Presents, 24 April 1960 (Season 5, Episode 28), starring James Franciscus, George Mitchell, and Jack Weston.
- "M Is for the Many" – Originally published in Ellery Queen's Mystery Magazine, 1957. Adapted as Heart of Gold by James P. Cavanagh for Alfred Hitchcock Presents (Season 3, Episode 4), starring Darryl Hickman.
- "Party Line" – Adapted by Eli Jerome for Alfred Hitchcock Presents (Season 5, Episode 33), starring Judy Canova.
- "Symbol of Authority" – Originally published in Ellery Queen's Mystery Magazine, 1957. Adapted for Westinghouse Desilu Playhouse, February 2, 1959 (Season 1, Episode 15), starring Desi Arnaz, Jean Hagen, Donald Harron, Ernie Kovacs and Michael Landon.
- "The Right Kind of House" – Originally published in Haunted Houses: The Greatest Stories, 1997. Adapted by Robert C. Dennis for Alfred Hitchcock Presents (Season 3, Episode 23), starring Robert Emhardt and Jeanette Nolan.
- "The Self-Improvement of Salvadore Ross" – Originally published in The Magazine of Fantasy and Science Fiction, 1961. Adapted by Jerry McNeely for Twilight Zone, January 17, 1964 (Season 5, Episode 16), starring Don Gordon.
- "The Old Man in the Cave", based on his 1962 story "The Old Man," for Twilight Zone, November 8, 1963 (Season 5, Episode 7); teleplay written by Rod Serling.

== Awards and nominations ==
In 1960, he was awarded the Edgar Award for Best First Novel for The Gray Flannel Shroud (1958).

== Death ==
In 2002, he died of complications due to minor elective surgery.
