= Alfred Hitchcock's Mystery Magazine =

Monthly digest fiction magazine

- November/December 2023 cover
- Editor: Linda Landrigan
- Former editors: Cathleen Jordan
- Categories: Crime fiction, detective fiction
- Frequency: Bi-Monthly
- Founded: 1956
- Company: 1 Paragraph, Inc. (2025–)
- Country: United States
- Based in: Connecticut
- Language: English
- Website: www.alfredhitchcockmysterymagazine.com
- ISSN: 0002-5224
- OCLC: 1479088

Alfred Hitchcock's Mystery Magazine (AHMM) is a bi-monthly digest size fiction magazine specializing in crime and detective fiction. AHMM is named for Alfred Hitchcock, the famed director of suspense films and television.

== History ==
AHMM was founded in 1956 by HSD Publications, which licensed the use of the director's name. Though there was no formal connection with the television show, stories published in the magazine were sometimes adapted by the producers of Alfred Hitchcock Presents, and later, The Alfred Hitchcock Hour. A few writers, such as Henry Slesar, wrote for both. Other contributors during the magazine’s early years included Evan Hunter (under the pen name Ed McBain), Ed Lacy, Bill Pronzini, Jim Thompson, Donald E. Westlake and Charles Willeford (who briefly worked for the magazine). Pat Hitchcock, Alfred's daughter, also briefly worked for the magazine.

In 1975, AHMM was acquired by Davis Publications, which later sold the magazine along with its sister publication, Ellery Queen's Mystery Magazine to Dell Magazines in 1992. It was sold to 1 Paragraph Inc. in 2025.

After EQMM, AHMM is the second-longest-running mystery fiction magazine. In 2006, the magazine celebrated its 50th anniversary with the publication of the anthology Alfred Hitchcock’s Mystery Magazine Presents Fifty Years of Crime and Suspense.

In 2007, AHMM joined with The Wolfe Pack, a society founded in 1978 to celebrate the Nero Wolfe stories of Rex Stout, to sponsor the Black Orchid Novella Contest for stories in the "classic detective” style of Stout’s Nero Wolfe.

=== Owners ===
- HSD Publications (1956–1975)
- Davis Publications (1975–1992)
- Dell Magazines (1992–2025)
- 1 Paragraph Inc. (2025–present)

=== Editors ===
- William Manners (1956–1961)
- Lisa Belknap (1961–1962)
- Richard E. Decker (1963–1964)
- G.F. Foster (1964–1967)
- Ernest M. Hutter (1967–1976)
- Eleanor Regis Sullivan (1975–1981)
- Cathleen Jordan (1981–2002)
- Linda Landrigan (2002–present)

=== Circulation Figures ===
Year	Number of Copies Printed
2013	19,270
2017	14,509
2023	10,275
2024	10,050

== Content ==
Each issue contains original works of short crime or mystery fiction, as well as a book review column "Booked & Printed”, a puzzle, a "Mysterious Photograph” story contest, and a "Mystery Classic" reprint.

=== Authors ===
Over its history AHMM has published short fiction by noted mystery novelists such as Robert Bloch, Lawrence Block, G. K. Chesterton, Ron Goulart, Dorothy L. Sayers, and Donald E. Westlake. The magazine has also regularly featured such short story specialists as John H. Dirckx, Kenneth Gavrell, Edward D. Hoch, Jack Ritchie, and Stephen Wasylyk.

Many writers have published their first mystery story in AHMM, including Mitch Alderman, Doug Allyn, Gregory Fallis, Steve Hockensmith, Martin Limón, D. A. McGuire, J. R. Parsons and I. J. Parker.

In recent years, regular contributors have also included Rhys Bowen, Jan Burke, O'Neil De Noux, John F. Dobbyn, Joan Druett, Brendan DuBois, Loren D. Estleman, David Edgerley Gates, Toni Kelner, R. T. Lawton, Robert Lopresti, Beverle Graves Myers, Jas R. Petrin, Anthony Rainone, Stephen Ross, Gilbert M. Stack, Marianne Wilski Strong, Steven Torres, Elaine Viets, James Lincoln Warren, Sarah Weinman, Mike Wiecek and Angela Zeman.

== Awards ==
AHMM stories have won almost every major mystery award, including the Edgar Allan Poe Award for Best Short Story, presented by the Mystery Writers of America; the Robert L. Fish Award for Best First Short Story; the Agatha Award for Best Short Story, presented at the Malice Domestic conference; and the Shamus Award for Best P. I. Short Story, presented by the Private-Eye Writers of America.

== See also ==
- Alfred Hitchcock's Anthology, (1977–1989) a spin-off magazine consisting of AHMM reprints
