= Warrior's Heart =

Warrior's Heart may refer to:

== Film and television ==
- The Warrior's Heart, a 1992 Norwegian film
- A Warrior's Heart, a 2011 American film
- Warrior's Heart, a 2007 film directed by Ikechukwu Onyeka
- "A Warrior's Heart", a 2001 episode of the television series Baki the Grappler
- "Warrior's Heart", a 2002 episode of the television series Always and Everyone

== Literature ==
- A Warrior's Heart, a 1992 novel by Margaret Moore
- The Warrior’s Heart: Rules of Engagement for the Spiritual War Zone, a 2004 book by Harry R. Jackson Jr.
- Warrior's Heart, a 2006 Dragonlance novel by Stephen D. Sullivan
- "Herz des Kämpfers (Warrior's Heart)", a 2007 chapter of the manga series Übel Blatt
- The Warrior's Heart, a 2012 young adult edition of a 2011 memoir by Eric Greitens
- A Warrior's Heart: The True Story of Life Before and Beyond The Fighter, a 2012 autobiography of Micky Ward

== See also ==
- Heart of the Warrior, a 2000 Spanish film
- The Heart of the Warrior, a 1996 novel
- The Heart of a Warrior, a 2010 novel
- Heart of a Warrior, a 2013 song
