= Allan Guthrie =

Scottish literary agent, author and editor

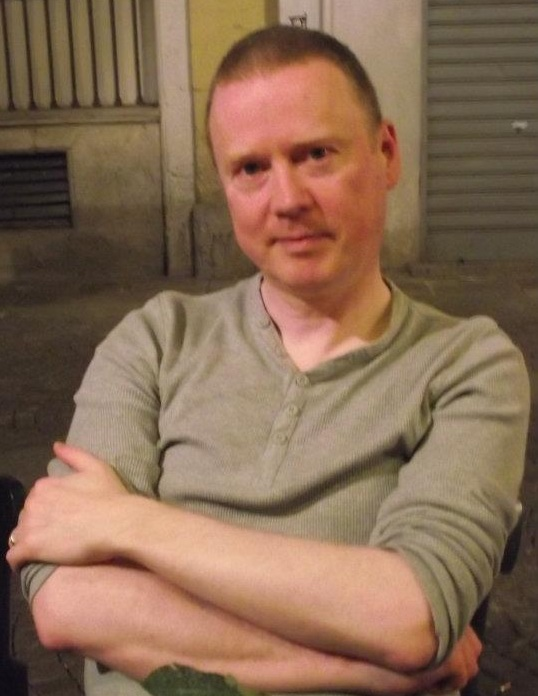
Allan Guthrie in Italy (2012)

Allan Guthrie (born Allan Buchan; 5 June 1965) is a Scottish literary agent, author and editor of crime fiction.

He was born in Orkney, but has lived in Edinburgh for most of his adult life. His first novel, Two-Way Split, was shortlisted for the CWA Debut Dagger Award, and it won the Theakston's Old Peculier Crime Novel of the Year Award in 2007. His second novel, Kiss Her Goodbye, was nominated for an Edgar Award, an Anthony Award, and a Gumshoe Award.

Guthrie is part of a literary circle that includes Ken Bruen, Reed Farrel Coleman, and Jason Starr.

Guthrie's books are published by Polygon, an imprint of Birlinn Limited.

== Digital publishing ==
Allan Guthrie at the 2012 Turin International Book Fair

On 1 November 2011, Allan Guthrie together with serial entrepreneur Kyle MacRae, launched Blasted Heath, the first digital-only Scottish publisher. All Blasted Heath ebooks were free from digital rights management (DRM) and were supplied in three file formats to ensure compatibility with all then current ebook readers.

PRC works on the Kindle, EPUB with virtually all other readers, including Nook and Sony and PDF for computers and smartphones.

The opening line-up of Blasted Heath titles included three crime novels by Ray Banks, Douglas Lindsay, Nigel Bird and Anthony Neil Smith. Also two debut novels, a cyber-thriller by Gary Carson and a novel for film lovers by movie critic Brian Pendreigh, were also available to buy.

Blasted Heath closed doors on 20 March 2017.

== Bibliography ==
=== Novels ===
- Two-Way Split (2004)
- Kiss Her Goodbye (2005)
- Hard Man (2007)
- Savage Night (2008)
- Slammer (2009)

=== Novellas ===
- Kill Clock (2007)
- Killing Mum (2009)
- Bye Bye Baby (2010)

== Prizes and awards ==
- 2001 CWA Debut Dagger (nominee): Blithe Psychopaths (Two-Way Split)
- 2006 Edgar Award Best Paperback Original Award (nominee): Kiss Her Goodbye
- 2006 Anthony Award (nominee): Kiss Her Goodbye
- 2006 The Mystery Ink Gumshoe Award (nominee): Kiss Her Goodbye
- 2007 Theakston's Old Peculier Crime Novel of the Year Award (winner): Two-Way Split
