= Lou Martini Jr. =

American film, stage and television actor

- Born: December 7, 1960 (age 65)
- Occupations: Film, stage and television actor
- Years active: 1968–present

Lou Martini Jr. (born December 7, 1960) is an American film, stage and television actor. He is best known for playing the recurring role of Anthony Infante, the brother-in-law of Johnny Sack, in the sixth season of the American crime drama television series The Sopranos.

Martini guest-starred in numerous television programs including America's Most Wanted (as a mobster), Blue Bloods, The Gastineau Girls (as Doorman/Host), Orange Is the New Black, Law & Order: Criminal Intent, White Collar, Law & Order: Organized Crime and The Blacklist. He also appeared in numerous films such as The Godfather, Heartbreak Hospital, Still Here, What's So Bad About Feeling Good?, The Irishman, In the Cut and Killa Season.
