= Tales of Adventure =

Tales of Adventure may refer to:

- Tales of Adventure (TV series), a 1952-53 Canadian television series
- Tales of Adventure, an album by Breeding Ground (band)

== See also ==
- Adventure Tales
