= John Gregory Betancourt =

American writer (born 1963)

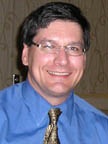
- Born: October 25, 1963 (age 62); St. Louis, Missouri, U.S.
- Education: Temple University
- Occupations: Writer, publisher
- Spouse: Kim Betancourt
- Children: 2
- Writing career
- Genres: Science fiction, fantasy, mystery novels

John Gregory Betancourt (born October 25, 1963) is an American writer of science fiction, fantasy and mystery novels, as well as short stories. He is also known as the founder and publisher, with his wife Kim Betancourt, of Wildside Press in 1989. In 1998, they entered the print on demand (PoD) market and greatly expanded their production. In addition to publishing new novels and short stories, they have undertaken projects to publish new editions of collections of stories that appeared in historic magazines.

Prior to establishing the new business, Betancourt worked as an assistant editor at Amazing Stories and editor of Horror: The Newsmagazine of the Horror Field, the revived Weird Tales magazine, the first issue of H. P. Lovecraft's Magazine of Horror (which he subsequently hired Marvin Kaye to edit), Cat Tales magazine (which he subsequently hired George H. Scithers to edit), and Adventure Tales magazine. He worked as a senior editor for Byron Preiss Visual Publications (1989–1996) and iBooks.

Betancourt wrote four Star Trek novels and the new Chronicles of Amber prequel series, as well as a dozen original novels. His essays, articles, and reviews have appeared in such diverse publications as Writer's Digest, The Washington Post, and Amazing Stories.

== Early life ==
Betancourt's father is Felipe Pablo "Philip" Betancourt, an archeologist. His brother Michael Betancourt became a critical theorist.

When he was a child, the Betancourt family spent summers in Greece, especially Crete, where his father worked on the excavation at Kommos in the 1970s, and Pseira in the 1980s. There the younger Betancourt developed a love for reading and discovered such diverse writers as Clark Ashton Smith, Michael Moorcock, and Jack Vance through books imported from the United Kingdom. He said of this time, "When I ran out of stories, I made up my own to keep myself entertained. I can trace the impulse to become a writer to age fourteen, when I spent most of a summer writing sequels to classics like Treasure Island."

Betancourt's first published work was a poem, "The Argia," in Space & Time magazine at age 15. At age 16, he made his first professional sale, "Vernon's Dragon," to the anthology 100 Great Fantasy Short-Short Stories, edited by Isaac Asimov, John F. Carr, and Martin H. Greenberg. He began The Blind Archer, at age 17, finished it at age 18, and sold it to Avon Books as his debut novel at age 19. He graduated from Temple University with a Bachelor of Arts.

== Career ==
Betancourt has alternated between writing and editing throughout his career. He worked for Amazing Stories as an assistant editor from 1985 to 1987. When the Philadelphia office shut down, he co-founded a literary agency with George Scithers and Darrell Schweitzer. A year later, Betancourt, Scithers, and Schweitzer licensed the name Weird Tales from Weird Tales, Ltd. and revived the magazine. Betancourt worked as an editor there until 1990.

Betancourt married Kim Betancourt (née Hermo) in 1989, and they moved from Philadelphia to Newark, New Jersey. He founded Wildside Press in 1989 to publish a collection of essays by Fritz Leiber designed to commemorate Leiber's appearance as Principal Speaker at Philcon that year. The book, Fafhrd & Me sold out quickly, and Betancourt decided to publish additional titles as a hobby.

Betancourt was named science fiction editor for Byron Preiss Visual Publications in 1990. He worked for Byron Preiss for 7 years, rising to senior editor, before leaving to write full-time and take care of his and Kim Betancourt's first child. This marked the beginning of his most prolific period as an author.

Betancourt also continued to publish books through Wildside Press during this period, using local short-run printers and Pulphouse Publishing to print new titles. Some of the limited editions, particularly titles by Mike Resnick, are impressive efforts. The limited editions of Resnick's Lucifer Jones series are bound in such exotic materials as Spanish cork, French leopard-patterned cloth, and leather. The limited editions he published of Bradley Denton's two short story collections are bound in Spanish snakeskin-patterned cloth and elephant-hide paper. The lettered editions have mahogany slipcases. The Denton collections won a World Fantasy Award for Best Collection of the Year.

Weird Tales was sold to Betancourt in late 2005. He has continued to publish the magazine through Wildside Press. In 2006 he hired Stephen H. Segal as editorial director of the magazine; Segal subsequently recruited Ann VanderMeer as fiction editor. In 2009, Segal and VanderMeer won a Hugo Award for Weird Tales in the category of Best Semiprozine. The magazine was also nominated for a 2009 World Fantasy Award.

== Print on demand ==
In 1998, Betancourt discovered print on demand technology, which produces one book at a time. He became a pioneer in the field, bringing hundreds (eventually thousands) of books into print through PoD. Betancourt incorporated Wildside Press in 2004 and continued to expand the company, as gross annual sales continued to grow. As of January 2010, Wildside Press had more than 11,000 books in print, ranging from classic literature to genre titles by H. Beam Piper, John W. Campbell, Jr., Andre Norton, and others.

Wildside Press took up an increasing amount of his time, though Betancourt still managed to produce one novel and several short stories most years. He brought in genre writers and editors to work on Wildside Press projects. Employees in the 2000–07 period included such authors and editors as P.D. Cacek, Darrell Schweitzer, George H. Scithers, Vera Nazarian, Stephen H. Segal, and Sean Wallace.

In 2006, Betancourt partnered with AudioRealms to release new and classic science fiction, fantasy, and horror in Audiobook format. Initial releases included H. Beam Piper's Little Fuzzy and Andre Norton's The Time Traders, as well as works by Robert E. Howard and H.P. Lovecraft.

At the same time, Betancourt created a new mass-market paperback line, Cosmos Books, with Dorchester Publishing.

In 2007, Betancourt received the Black Orchid Novella Award from the Nero Wolfe Society (the "Wolfe Pack") and Alfred Hitchcock's Mystery Magazine for his novella "Horse Pit." The award, which consisted of a certificate, a prize of $1,000, and publication in the magazine, was presented at the Wolfe Pack's annual Black Orchid Banquet on December 1, 2007.

John Gregory Betancourt lives in Maryland with his wife Kim and two children.

== Works ==
=== Novels ===
- 1987 Starskimmer
- 1987 Rogue Pirate
- 1988 Johnny Zed
- 1988 The Blind Archer
- 1990 Rememory
- 1995 Devil in the Sky (Star Trek: Deep Space Nine) with Greg Cox
- 1995 Incident at Arbuk (Star Trek: Voyager)
- 1995 Born of Elven Blood with Kevin J. Anderson
- 1995 Cutthroat Island
- 1996 Birthright: The Hag's Contract
- 1996 The Heart of the Warrior (Star Trek: Deep Space Nine)
- 1997 Hercules: The Wrath of Poseidon
- 1997 Hercules: The Vengeance of Hera
- 1999 Infection (Star Trek: The Next Generation)
- 2001 Hercules: The Gates of Hades
- 2002 Pacifica with Linda E. Bushyager
- 2003 The Dawn of Amber (#1 in the Amber prequel series)
- 2003 The Dragon Sorcerer
- 2004 Chaos and Amber (#2 in the Amber prequel series)
- 2004 To Rule in Amber (#3 in the Amber prequel series)
- 2005 Shadows of Amber (#4 in the Amber prequel series)
- unpublished/unwritten Sword of Chaos (#5 in the Amber prequel series)
- 2023 The Things from Another World (authorized sequel to Who Goes There? by John W. Campbell, Jr.)

=== Short story collections ===
- 1991 Slab's Tavern and Other Uncanny Places
- 1992 Performance Art
- 2005 Playing in Wonderland
- 2012 Pit and the Pendulum: The Adventures of Peter Pit-Bull Geller

=== Young adult series ===
- Dr. Bones
  - 1989 No. 4 The Dragons of Komako
- Robert Silverberg's Time Tours
  - 1991 No. 4 The Dinosaur Trackers as Thomas Shadwell with Arthur Byron Cover and Timothy Robert Sullivan
  - 1991 No. 6 Caesar's Time Legions as Jeremy Kingston
- The New Adventures of Superman
  - 1996 No. 2 Exile with Michael Jan Friedman

=== Magazines edited ===
- Amazing Stories as assistant editor to George H. Scithers
- Weird Tales with George H. Scithers and Darrell Schweitzer
- H.P. Lovecraft's Magazine of Horror with Marvin Kaye (first issue only)
- Adventure Tales
- Black Cat Weekly

=== Anthologies ===
- 1991 The Ultimate Dracula with Byron Preiss (uncredited)
- 1991 The Ultimate Frankenstein with Byron Preiss
- 1991 The Ultimate Werewolf with Byron Preiss
- 1993 Swashbuckling Editor Stories
- 1993 The Ultimate Witch with Byron Preiss
- 1993 The Ultimate Zombie with Byron Preiss
- 1995 The Ultimate Alien with Byron Preiss
- 1995 Best of Weird Tales (Barnes & Noble, 498 pages)
- 1997 Best of Weird Tales: 1923 (Borgo Press, 132 pages)
- 1996 New Masterpieces of Horror
- 1997 Weird Tales: Seven Decades of Terror
- 2005 Horrorscape: New Masterpieces of Horror, vol. 1
- 2006 Horror: The Best of the Year, 2006 Edition with Sean Wallace

=== Non-fiction ===
- 1996 Serve It Forth – Cooking with Anne McCaffrey with Anne McCaffrey
- 1996 The Sci-Fi Channel Trivia Book
- 1998 The Sci-Fi Channel Encyclopedia of TV Science Fiction with Roger Fulton
