= Firelord (novel) =

1980 novel by Parke Godwin

- First edition
- Author: Parke Godwin
- Publisher: Bantam Books
- Publication date: 1982
- Media type: Paperback
- Pages: 369
- ISBN: 9780553148947

Firelord is a historical fantasy novel by Parke Godwin, first published in 1980. The novel is a retelling of the King Arthur legend.

== Firelord sequence ==
Beloved Exile (1984) is the second book in the Firelord trilogy. It and Firelord were later published as one book in Germany (Feuerkönig; Die Erbin von Camelot).

== Short stories ==
"Uallannach - Invitation to Camelot" was written by Parke Godwin in 1988. It was later published by editor Mike Ashley in Chronicles of the Round Table (1997).

== Synopsis ==
The novel begins with a mortally wounded Arthur dictating his memoir to a friar at a monastery after the Battle of Camlann. In flashback the reader is led through his formative years, his first meeting with Merlin, his rise to fame in the service of the British High King Ambrosius Aurelianus, his military campaigns against the Saxons, and his eventual downfall.

Despite some fantasy elements, Godwin aims to tell the story of King Arthur from a historically accurate perspective, based on his own research, including archeological trips to various parts of England. He returns the Arthurian characters to the time period and place in which they might actually have lived - 5th-century post-Roman Wales and Cornwall. He uses historically appropriate Latin and Brythonic names for the characters, such as Artos and Artorius for Arthur, Gwenhwyfar for Guinevere, and (the conjectural) Ancellius for Lancelot.

Morgan le Fay, called Morgana, is a sympathetic character in Firelord. She is presented as a fiery leader of the wild Prydn people who live north of Hadrian's Wall. However, Guinevere is the principal female character. At the center of the novel, Godwin's Arthur is torn between his desire for the simple joy of love and family (represented by Morgana le Fay) and his ambition to fulfill his destiny to become Emperor of Britain (represented by Guinevere).

== Awards ==
The World Fantasy Award nominee Firelord (1980). The novel was later published as a book in Germany (Feuerkönig - Die Camelot-Chronik). The Balrog Award and Locus Poll Award nominee Firelord as well.

== Editions ==
- Firelord, Avon Books, ISBN 0-380-77551-4
