= Time and Teresa Golowitz =

- The Twilight Zone segment
- Episode no.: Season 2 Episode 34a
- Directed by: Shelley Levinson
- Written by: Alan Brennert
- Based on: "Influencing the Hell Out of Time and Teresa Golowitz" by Parke Godwin
- Original air date: July 10, 1987

Guest appearances
- Paul Sand as Bluestone; Gene Barry as Prince of Darkness; Heather Haase as Mary Ellen Cosgrove; Grant Heslov as Blaustein; Kristi Lynes as Teresa Golowitz; Gina Gershon as Laura

Episode chronology
← Previous "Private Channel"	Next → "Voices in the Earth"

"Time and Teresa Golowitz" is the first segment of the 34th episode, the 10th episode of the second season (1986–87) of the television series The Twilight Zone. It is based on Parke Godwin's "Influencing the Hell Out of Time and Teresa Golowitz", which was published in The Twilight Zone Magazine (January 1982). In this segment, the Devil gives a Broadway composer a second chance to prevent his high school classmate's suicide.

== Plot ==
Bluestone, a Broadway composer, dies of a heart attack. The Devil offers him one wish, with the entire universe and all time up for the taking, in exchange for his playing his music in Hell from time to time. Bluestone's wish is to "make it" with Mary Ellen Cosgrove, his high school sweetheart.

Bluestone finds himself at a party in October 1948. However, despite his body being restored to adolescence, with his middle-age experience he now sees Mary Ellen as just a child. He spots Teresa Golowitz, a plain girl Mary Ellen invited to make herself look better. The Devil reminds Bluestone that Golowitz committed suicide that night and reveals that the reason was depression over her social isolation.

Determined to prevent this, Bluestone tries talking to Teresa, but the other guests pull him away and get him to play "How About You?" on piano. Teresa spontaneously sings along, amazing the guests with her vocal talent. She shuns their praises and leaves the party. Bluestone follows and tries to convince her that her singing talent is of star quality and is her key to fitting in. In an effort to ensure her suicide attempt is averted, he asks her to promise to meet with him tomorrow to talk about her singing prospects, but she will not commit to it. He helps Mary Ellen fend off an unwanted paramour and gives her a friendly farewell. Right before he leaves, Teresa tipsily tells him she is getting a ride home with another girl from the party, thus avoiding her previous fate of stepping in front of a bus.

Bluestone returns to the present and discovers that Teresa has become an award-winning singer, with Bluestone composing for her. The authorities in Heaven are upset about their altering the past, so he has to lie low for a while in Hell. Bluestone deduces that this was the Devil's plan all along, but the Devil insists it was only a side benefit and that he likes Teresa's singing.

== Production ==
The show's network, CBS, were concerned that The Twilight Zone had been using the Devil too often, so the script for "Time and Teresa Golowitz" was changed to replace the Devil with the angel Gabriel, with plans to cast John Anderson in the part. Anderson was a veteran of the 1960s The Twilight Zone, and his casting would have specifically been a reference to his playing Gabriel in the episode "A Passage for Trumpet". However, the production team still liked the idea of having the Devil in a non-villainous role, and they ultimately convinced CBS to let them use the Devil one more time.

The music was handled by William Goldstein, who also provided Bluestone's hands in all the shots of him playing piano.

This episode originally had a 30 minutes long final cut for inclusion in a one-hour format show, but it had to be cut to 24 minutes when CBS requested half-hour episodes. The excised footage, in which the Devil teleports Bluestone's dead body to his bed and Bluestone convinces Teresa to stay longer at the party (instead of her leaving immediately after "How About You?" as in the broadcast episode), is included on the DVD release as bonus material. The last few seconds of Bluestone and Golowitz performing another song, "Sweet and Lovely", is included in the excised footage.
