= Black Orchid Novella Award =

- Date: 2007
- Location: New York, New York
- Country: United States
- Presented by: The Wolfe Pack
- Website: http://www.nerowolfe.org

The Black Orchid Novella Award is a literary award for excellence in the mystery genre presented by The Wolfe Pack, the official Nero Wolfe Society which was founded in 1978 to explore and celebrate the stories of Nero Wolfe by Rex Stout.

The award is presented annually at the Wolfe Pack's Annual Black Orchid Banquet, traditionally held on the first Saturday in December in New York City. The award was announced in 2006 and was actually given out for the first time in 2007.

To qualify:

- Each entry must be an original unpublished work of fiction that conforms to the tradition of the Nero Wolfe series
- Entries must be 15,000 to 20,000 words in length

== Winners ==
Year	Author	Title	Publication Date
2007	John Gregory Betancourt	"Horse Pit"	July/August 2008
2008	Michael Nethercott	"O'Nelligan's Glory"	July/August 2009
2009	Steve Liskow	"The Strangle Hold"	July/August 2010
2010	Bradley Crowther	"Politics Make Dead Bedfellow"	July/August 2011
2011	James Lincoln Warren	"Inner Fire"	July/August 2012
2012	Robert Lopresti	"The Red Envelope"	July/August 2013
2013	Susan Thibadeau	"The Discarded Spouse"	July/August 2014
2014	K.B. McAbee	"Dyed to Death"	July/August 2015
2015	Mark Thielman	"A Meter of Murder"	July/August 2016
2016	Steve Liskow	"Look What They've Done to My Song, Ma"	July/August 2016
2017	Mark Thielman	"The Black Drop of Venus"	July/August 2018
2018	Mark Bruce	"Minerva James and the Goddess of Justice"	July/August 2019
2019	Ted Burge	"The Red Taxi"	July/August 2020
2020	Tom Larsen	"El Cuerpo en el Barril" ("The Body in the Barrel")	July/August 2021
2021	Alexis Stefanovich-Thomson	"The Man Who Went Down Under"	July/August 2022
2022	Jacqueline Freimor	"The Case of the Bogus Cinderellas"	July/August 2023
2023	Libby Cudmore	"Alibi in Ice"	July/August 2024
2024	T.M. Bradshaw	"Double Take"	July/August 2025
2025	Pete Barnstrom	"The Troubling Mr. Truelove"	July/August 2026
