= H. P. Lovecraft's Magazine of Horror =

Horror magazine

- Fall 2006 cover
- Editor: Marvin Kaye
- Categories: Horror
- Frequency: Quarterly
- Publisher: Wildside Press
- First issue: 11 April 2004
- Final issue Number: 2009; 5
- Country: United States
- Based in: Rockville, Maryland
- Language: English
- ISSN: 1552-8642
- OCLC: 56578756

H. P. Lovecraft's Magazine of Horror was a quarterly horror magazine edited by Marvin Kaye and published by Wildside Press. The magazine was named after H. P. Lovecraft, an American author.

== History and profile ==
Issue #1 was published on 11 April 2004 and was primarily edited by John Gregory Betancourt, with Marvin Kaye taking over the editorial duties and being listed as editor on this and subsequent issues. An interim issue numbered 1.5 was mailed free to subscribers. Issue #3 was a special Brian Lumley issue. The magazine was originally announced as a quarterly, but appeared on an irregular basis. It had its headquarters in Rockville, Maryland.

The magazine was "indefinitely suspended" after five issues. Issue #5 was published in 2009, after which the magazine was merged with Weird Tales.

== See also ==
- Science fiction magazine
- Fantasy fiction magazine
- Horror fiction magazine
