= Waiting for the Galactic Bus =

1988 novel by Parke Godwin

- First edition
- Author: Parke Godwin
- Cover artist: Chris Hopkins
- Language: English
- Series: The Snake Oil Series
- Genre: Science fiction
- Publisher: Doubleday
- Publication date: 1988
- Publication place: United States
- Media type: Print (hardcover)
- Pages: 244 pages
- Preceded by: A Truce With Time
- Followed by: The Snake Oil Wars

Waiting for the Galactic Bus is a 1988 science fiction novel by Parke Godwin and published by Doubleday Books. It is followed by The Snake Oil Wars in 1989.

== Plot summary ==
The tale begins with two college-age brothers, Barion and Coyul, members of an advanced alien world. Their race is endowed with the power to manipulate physical matter with their minds, a power which is exploited incessantly by the young adults. An accident strands the brothers on Earth, which at the time has no human race. The brothers hope for rescue, but eventually grow despondent. In their free time, they cause a series of evolutionary changes in the indigenous primates of Earth, which eventually lead to the blossoming of human civilization.

The brothers grow fond of their project, which they ardently monitor, intervening when necessary. With all the progress they are able to endow humans with, they are never able to rid them of the dim memory of primal darkness, causing a permanent schism between intellect and emotion, which is termed "spiritual schizophrenia". Humans have an insatiable need to decipher the meaning of life, a thirst which leads to stubborn belief systems and immense amounts of violence.

Eons later, the brothers' creation is in danger due to an unlikely courtship. Charity Stovall is a passionately religious young woman from a small American town. She is poised to marry Roy Stride, a violent young fascist. The young couple is oblivious to the fact that if they were to bear a child, it could possibly be more destructive than Hitler to human culture and possibly humanity itself. Subsequently, the two brothers literally put the duo through hell to keep them apart, subjecting them to outrageous scenarios beyond their control.

== Literary devices ==
Much of the story is expressed through character dialogue, in an outrageous style similar to that of acclaimed British writer Douglas Adams. Godwin also makes frequent allusions to a variety of notable American pop culture icons such as McDonald's, Charlton Heston, and Haight-Ashbury. The writing style incorporates elements of absurdism, especially the futility of attempting to find meaning in the universe.

== Themes ==
Waiting for the Galactic Bus is rich in satire. Godwin uses Charity Stovall's character to symbolize the pitfalls of ignorance and ethnocentrism; Charity has good intentions but has the misfortune of believing what she hears. Roy, on the other hand, personifies racism, prejudice, and its often violent ramifications. Godwin uses these character interactions to satirize ignorance, government, and blind adherence to one's beliefs. Organized religion plays a major role in the development of the story; humans invest an abundance of time in attempting to find a supernatural and transcendent meaning to life. In the book (as in the real world), this search is fruitless; even the creators of their world are morally flawed (perhaps more so than the humans themselves) and the main characters' adherence to religion serves only to misguide them and cause strife.

In addition, Godwin also satirizes the negative aspects of contemporary American culture, most prominently the perceived obsession with television and materialistic goods. The brothers keep Charity occupied by making her into a star; she finds in her wealth a physical and immediate gratification but also realizes the absence of depth and meaning in her new-found fame.

== Critical reactions ==
Jo Walton wrote that Waiting for the Galactic Bus "is one of the candidates for weirdest book in the world. ... This is not a book that even nods to realism. Indeed, it’s a book that I doubt realism would recognise if it passed it by in the street. ... But there are other virtues, and it has those—it’s charming and funny and genuinely original, it fits together like a sliding block puzzle and it’s light and dark at the same time. ... If you like books that are beautifully written, and funny, and not like anything else, and if you don’t mind blasphemy, you might really enjoy this."

== See also ==
- Parke Godwin

== Sources ==
- Waiting for the Galactic Bus by Parke Godwin, Doubleday: 1989.
- Review by Charlie Gebetsberger in Rambles
- Review by Maria Nutick in Green Man Review
