= Kim Betancourt =

American publisher

- Born: United States
- Occupation: Publisher
- Spouse: John Gregory Betancourt

Kim Betancourt is an American publisher, who co-founded Wildside Press in 1989 with her husband, science fiction writer John Gregory Betancourt.

She has been nominated for a World Fantasy Award two times for their publishing company's efforts to revive Weird Tales Magazine, as well as to produce new editions of classic science fiction and speculative fiction.

In addition to her work at Wildside Press, Betancourt also serves as Vice President of Economics and Multifamily Market Research at Fannie Mae in Washington, D.C.
