= Marvin Kaye =

American novelist

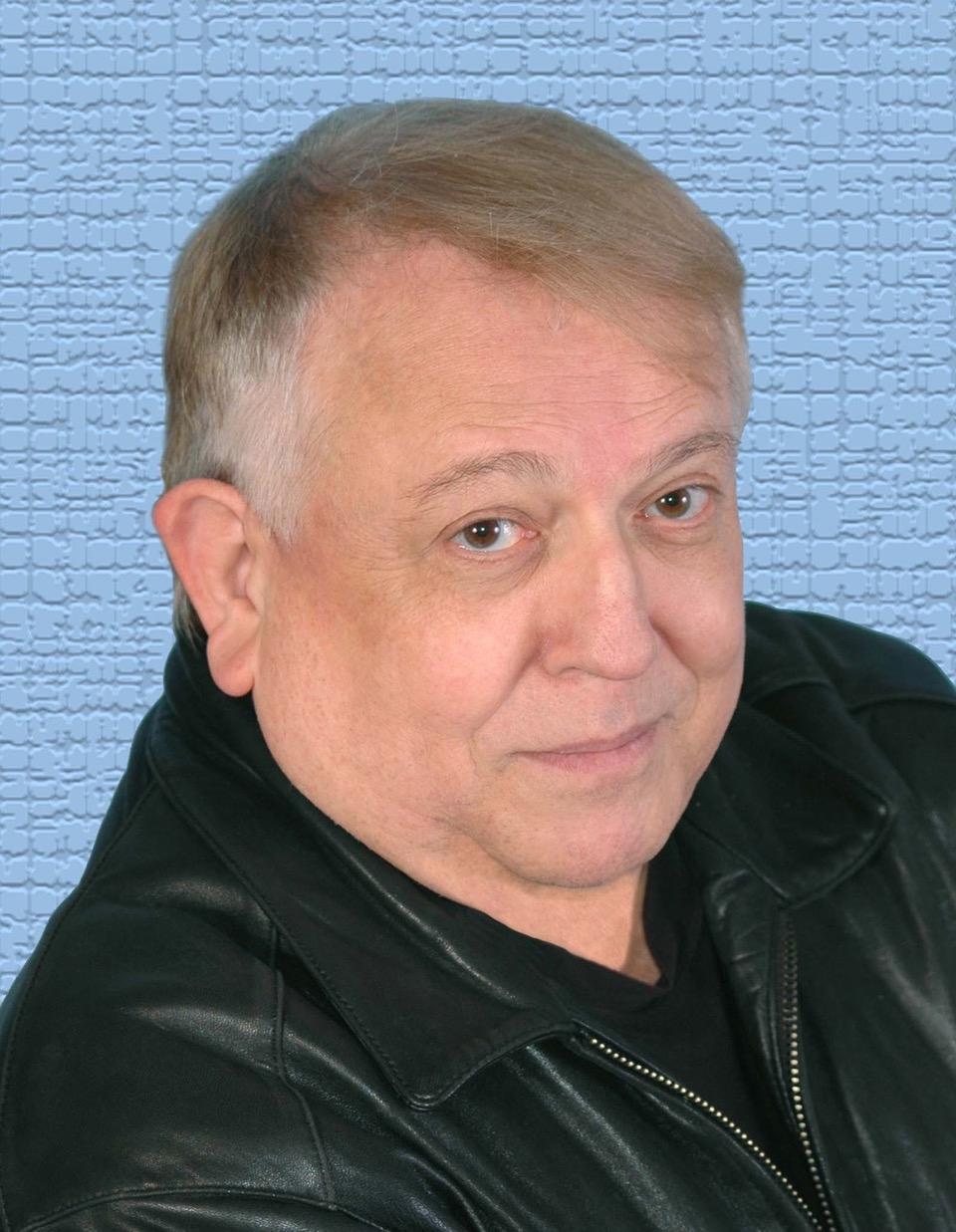
- Marvin Kaye
- Born: Marvin Nathan Kaye; March 10, 1938; Philadelphia, Pennsylvania, U.S.
- Died: May 13, 2021 (aged 83); New York City, U.S.
- Education: Pennsylvania State University (BA, MA)
- Occupations: Novelist, editor, actor, magician
- Spouse: Saralee Bransdorf Kaye (m. 1963)
- Children: Terry Ellen Kaye
- Writing career
- Genres: Mystery, fantasy, Science fiction, horror, theatre, humor

Marvin Nathan Kaye (March 10, 1938 – May 13, 2021) was an American mystery, fantasy, science fiction, horror author, anthologist, and editor. He was also a magician and theater actor. Kaye was a World Fantasy Award winner and served as co-publisher and editor of Weird Tales Magazine.

== Early years ==
Kaye was born in Philadelphia, the son of Morris and Theresa (Baroski) Kaye. He received a Bachelor of Arts in liberal arts at Penn State in 1960, and a Master of Arts in English literature and theater in 1962.

== Career ==
Kaye served as a reporter for Grit Publishing Company from 1963 to 1965, an assistant managing editor for Business Travel Magazine in 1965, and a senior editor for Harcourt Brace Jovanovich from 1966 to 1970. In 1970, he went to work as a freelance writer. He was a lecturer at The New School for Social Research in New York City in 1975, taught at NYU as an adjunct professor of Creative Writing for many years beginning in 1976, and taught as an adjunct professor at Mercy College from 2001 to 2006.

As a magician and mentalist, Kaye often performed under the stage name Count Emkay the Miraculous. His book, The Stein and Day Handbook of Magic is considered an essential part of any magician's library. He also wrote The Handbook of Mental Magic. In 1976, he was the magic instructor for the performing arts summer camp French Woods Festival of the Performing Arts, which he used as research for his book Catalog of Magic.

As an actor, Kaye appeared on Broadway with Dame Edna, off-Broadway with Keir Dullea in the critically acclaimed Strings, and in many shows with The Open Book, including a cappella musical The Hoboken Chicken Emergency, which he adapted for the stage. He was an improvisational comedian, appearing periodically at Standup New York. He also performed regularly at the Jekyll & Hyde Club. He can be heard portraying several characters in The Open Book audiobook Take My Planet, Please! (Metamorphic Press/JestMaster Audio, 2021).

In 1975, Kaye co-founded "The Open Book," New York City's first and longest-lived readers theatre company, along with his wife, Saralee, and other noted theatre professionals. Kaye also established The Open Book's educational outreach division and curriculum, as well as an annual national playwriting competition co-sponsored by Doubleday's Stage & Screen Book Club. Kaye wrote two books about readers theatre: Readers Theatre: What It Is, How to Stage It, published in 1995 by Wildside Press; and From Page to Stage: Selecting and Adapting Literature for Readers Theatre, published in 1996 by Fireside Theatre. He also edited Frantic Comedy: 8 Plays of Knockabout Fun, published in 1993 by Fireside Theatre. Several of the plays were presented by The Open Book under Kaye's direction.

The Open Book performed Kaye's adaptation of his own novel, The Last Christmas of Ebenezer Scrooge, annually for several years. Kaye's final stage performances were in the revival of The Last Christmas of Ebenezer Scrooge in a short run of the play, also directed by Kaye, in December 2019 at the Pushkin Hall Theater in NYC.

Kaye authored nineteen novels including the science fiction cult classics, The Incredible Umbrella and (co-authored with Parke Godwin) The Masters of Solitude, and the critically acclaimed mysteries Bullets for Macbeth and My Son, the Druggist. Kaye's last book, published in 2020 by Metamorphic Press, was Quest for the Pastried Peach, his own whimsical retelling of the famous "Siberian Peach Pie" shaggy joke, which he wrote in a different literary style for each chapter. A collection of Kaye's poetry is planned for posthumous publication by Metamorphic Press.

Kaye edited numerous genre anthologies such as Fiends and Creatures and The Game is Afoot, as well as magazines such as H. P. Lovecraft's Magazine of Horror, Sherlock Holmes Mystery Magazine, and Black Cat Mystery Magazine. As a charter member of The Wolfe Pack, a literary society devoted to Nero Wolfe (the detective created by Rex Stout), Kaye compiled selected essays and stories from the group's journal, The Gazette, into two books in 2005, The Nero Wolfe Files and The Archie Goodwin Files. One of his anthologies, The Fair Folk, won a World Fantasy Award in 2006. In the summer of 2011, Kaye purchased America's oldest supernatural periodical (dating back to 1923), Weird Tales Magazine, with John Harlacher. Kaye was editor and co-publisher (with Harlacher). In addition to other artistic changes, Kaye instituted themed issues.

In August 2012, Kaye announced that Weird Tales was going to publish an excerpt from Victoria Foyt's controversial novel Save the Pearls, which many critics accused of featuring racist stereotyping. Kaye wrote an essay titled "A Thoroughly NONRACIST Novel" defending his decision to publish the excerpt. The essay and Kaye's decision to publish the excerpt were criticized, particularly by N. K. Jemisin and Jim C. Hines, and the publisher subsequently announced that Weird Tales no longer had plans to run the excerpt.

Kaye was also a regular columnist, writing "Marvin Kaye's Nth Dimension" for Space and Time, a science fiction magazine.

Kaye was a member of the Authors Guild, the Dramatists Guild of America, the Actors' Equity Association, The Broadway League, and The Sons of the Desert (of which he served as president from 1974 to 1976). He was also an honorary member of the Mark Twain Society.

== Personal life ==
Kaye married Saralee Bransdorf on August 4, 1963, in Wilkes-Barre, Pennsylvania; they had one child, Terry Ellen Kaye. Saralee Kaye died July 12, 2006, of complications from endometrial cancer in New York City. The couple resided in New York. Marvin Kaye died of natural causes on May 13, 2021, in New York. He is buried in the Sanctuary of Abraham & Sarah Mausoleum in Paramus, New Jersey.

== Bibliography ==
=== Hillary Quayle ===
- A Lively Game of Death (Saturday Review Press, 1972; reissued: Wildside Press, 1999)
- The Grand Ole Opry Murders (Saturday Review Press/Dutton, 1974)
  - aka The Country Music Murders (Wildside Press, 2000)
- Bullets for Macbeth (Saturday Review Press/Dutton, 1976; reissued: Wildside Press, 1999)
- The Laurel & Hardy Murders (Dutton, 1977; reissued: Wildside Press, 2001)
- The Soap Opera Slaughters (Doubleday, 1982; reissued: Wildside Press, 1999)

=== Marty Gold ===
- My Son, The Druggist (Doubleday, 1977; reissued: Wildside Press, 1999)
- My Brother, The Druggist (Doubleday, 1979; reissued: Wildside Press, 1999)

=== The Masters of Solitude ===
- The Masters of Solitude, with Parke Godwin (Doubleday, 1978)
- Wintermind, with Parke Godwin (Doubleday, 1982)

The novel A Cold Blue Light is sometimes listed as a third volume of the trilogy, but it is unrelated. The third volume, Singer Among the Nightingales was not published before the death of Parke Godwin.

=== Adrian Philimore ===
- The Incredible Umbrella (Doubleday, 1979)
- The Amorous Umbrella (Doubleday, 1981)
- The Incredible Umbrella Tetralogy (including The Incredible Umbrella, The Incredible Umbrella in Oz, The Amorous Umbrella, and The Cosmic Umbrella; Wildside Press, 2019)

=== Other novels ===
- A Cold Blue Light, with Parke Godwin (Charter Books, 1983)
- Ghosts Of Night And Morning (Charter Books, 1987)
- Fantastique (St. Martin's Press, 1992)
- The Last Christmas Of Ebenezer Scrooge (Wildside Press, 2003)
- The Passion of Frankenstein (Wildside Press, 2014)
- Quest for the Pastried Peach (Metamorphic Press, 2020)

=== Non-fiction ===
- The Histrionic Holmes: An Analysis and Dissertation on the Impersonatory Genius of Sherlock Holmes (L. Norris, 1971)
- A Toy is Born (Stein and Day, 1973)
  - aka The Story of Monopoly, Silly Putty, Bingo, Twister, Frisbee, Scrabble, et cetera (Stein and Day, 1977)
- The Stein and Day Handbook of Magic (Stein and Day, 1973)
  - aka The Complete Magician (Macmillan, 1974)
  - aka The Creative Magician's Handbook (Madison Books, 2001)
- The Handbook of Mental Magic (Stein and Day, 1975)
- Catalog of Magic (Doubleday, 1977)
- Readers Theatre: What It Is, How to Stage It; and Four Award-Winning Scripts (Wildside Press, 1995)
- From Page to Stage: Selecting and Adapting Literature for Readers Theatre (Fireside Theatre, 1996)
- Incisions Anthology of Winning Readers Theatre Plays (2000)
- Mister Jack - For Better or For Worse: Two Don Juan Plays (Wildside Press, 2010)

=== Edited anthologies ===
- Brother Theodore's Chamber of Horrors, with Brother Theodore (Pinnacle, 1975)
- Fiends and Creatures (Popular Library, 1975)
- Ghosts: A Treasury of Chilling Tales Old and New, with Saralee Kaye (Doubleday, 1981)
- The Possession of Immanuel Wolf and Other Improbable Tales (Doubleday, 1981; reissued Wildside Press, 2000)
- Masterpieces of Terror and the Supernatural: A Treasury of Spellbinding Tales Old & New, with Saralee Kaye (Doubleday, 1985)
- Devils & Demons: A Treasury of Fiendish Tales Old and New, with Saralee Kaye (Doubleday, 1987)
- Weird Tales: The Magazine That Never Dies, with Saralee Kaye (Doubleday Book & Music Clubs, 1988)
- Witches & Warlocks: Tales of Black Magic, Old and New (Guild America Books, 1989)
  - aka The Penguin Book of Witches & Warlocks: Tales of Black Magic, Old & New (Penguin Books, 1991)
- 13 Plays of Ghosts and the Supernatural, with a preface by José Ferrer (Doubleday Book & Music Clubs, 1990)
- Haunted America: Star-Spangled Supernatural Stories, with Saralee Kaye (Doubleday Book & Music Clubs, 1991)
- Lovers & Other Monsters: A Collection of Amorous Tales of Fantasy, Old and New (Doubleday Book & Music Clubs, 1991)
- Sweet Revenge: 10 Plays of Bloody Murder, with a preface by Marilyn Stasio (Fireside Theatre, 1992)
- Masterpieces of Terror and the Unknown (Doubleday Book & Music Clubs, 1993)
- Frantic Comedy: 8 Plays of Knockabout Fun, with an introduction by Tony Tanner (Fireside Theatre, 1993)
- The Game Is Afoot: Parodies, Pastiches and Ponderings of Sherlock Holmes (St. Martin's Press, 1994)
- Angels of Darkness: Tales of Troubled and Troubling Women (GuildAmerica Books, 1995)
- The Resurrected Holmes (St. Martin's Press, 1996)
- The Best of Weird Tales: 1923, with John Gregory Betancourt (Wildside Press, 1997)
- The Confidential Casebook of Sherlock Holmes (St. Martin's Press, 1998)
- Don't Open This Book! (Doubleday Direct Inc., 1998)
- The Vampire Sextette (GuildAmerica Books, 2000)
- The Ultimate Halloween (Ibooks, 2001)
- The Dragon Quintet (Science Fiction Book Club, 2003; reissued: Tor Books, 2006)
- The Nero Wolfe Files (Wildside Press, 2005)
- The Archie Goodwin Files (Wildside Press, 2005)
- The Fair Folk (Science Fiction Book Club, 2005)
- Forbidden Planets (Science Fiction Book Club, 2006)
- A Book of Wizards (Science Fiction Book Club, 2008)
- The Ghost Quartet (Tor Books, 2008)
