= Parke Godwin =

American novelist (1929–2013)

- Born: January 28, 1929; New York City, U.S.
- Died: June 19, 2013 (aged 84); Auburn, California, U.S.
- Occupation: Novelist
- Writing career
- Genres: Science fiction, fantasy, historical fiction
- Notable works: Sherwood, Firelord, Waiting for the Galactic Bus, "The Fire When It Comes.”

Parke Godwin (January 28, 1929 – June 19, 2013) was an American writer. He won the World Fantasy Award for Best Novella in 1982 for his story "The Fire When It Comes". He was a native of New York City, where he was born in 1929. He was the grandson of Harry Post Godwin.

== Works ==
Godwin is known for his novels of legendary figures placed in realistic historical settings, written in a lyrical yet precise prose style and sardonic humor. His retelling of parts of the Arthur legend, Firelord in 1980, Beloved Exile in 1984, and The Lovers: The Legend of Tristan and Yseult in 1999 (under the pseudonym Kate Hawks) is set in the 5th century during the collapse of the Roman Empire, and his reinterpretation of Robin Hood (Sherwood, 1991, and Robin and the King, 1993) takes place during the Norman Conquest and features kings William the Conqueror and William Rufus as major characters. His other well-known works include Waiting for the Galactic Bus (1988) and its sequel, The Snake Oil Wars, which is also known as The Snake Oil Variations, in 1989. These were humorous critiques of American pop culture and religion.

His short fiction has appeared in several anthologies. His short story "Influencing the Hell out of Time and Teresa Golowitz" was the basis of an episode of the television series The Twilight Zone.

Godwin was also at various times a radio operator, a research technician, a professional actor, an advertising man, a dishwasher and a maitre d' hotel.

In 2011, he was the Guest of Honor at the World Fantasy Con. He was placed in a close care facility in 2012 due to a decline in his long- and short-term memory. He died in 2013.

== Reception ==
Reviewing Godwin's novel Sherwood (1991), James Idema stated "Once into Parke Godwin's absorbing and highly original account of the ancient story, an appealing new Robin Hood will come to life... With impressive skill and vivid imagination, he portrays a hero, from childhood to young manhood, who is altogether credible in human terms".

== Bibliography ==
- Darker Places, 1973
- A Memory of Lions, 1976
- A Cold Blue Light, 1983 (with Marvin Kaye) (Berkley Books, 1983)
- The Fire When It Comes, 1984 (collection of short stories) (Hugo nominee)
- The Last Rainbow, 1985
- A Truce with Time, 1988
- Invitation to Camelot, 1988 (editor)
- Limbo Search, 1995
- The Tower of Beowulf, 1995
- Lord of Sunset, 1998
- The Night You Could Hear Forever, 1999 (collection of short stories and one play, CD-ROM release only)
- Watch By Moonlight, 2001 (as Kate Hawks)
- Prince of Nowhere, 2011

=== The Masters of Solitude series ===
- The Masters of Solitude, 1978 (with Marvin Kaye)
- Wintermind, 1982 (with Marvin Kaye)

The novel A Cold Blue Light, 1983 (with Marvin Kaye), is sometimes listed as the third volume of the trilogy, but is unrelated. The third volume, Singer Among The Nightingales, was partially written by Godwin and Kaye before their respective deaths, but never completed.

=== Firelord series ===
- Firelord, 1980
- Beloved Exile, 1984
- The Lovers: The Legend of Trystan and Yseult, 1999 (as Kate Hawks)

The Firelord books deal with the Arthurian legend and events before and after the time of King Arthur. Firelord is about Arthur's rise and his relationship with his powerful wife, Guenevere. Beloved Exile follows Guenevere after Arthur's death as different factions fight for control of Britain. Godwin's third novel featuring Arthurian material, The Lovers: The Legend of Trystan and Yseult, was published in 1999 under the pseudonym Kate Hawks.

=== Snake Oil series ===
- Waiting for the Galactic Bus, 1988
- The Snake Oil Wars: or Scheherazade Ginsberg Strikes Again, 1989 (also published under the title The Snake Oil Variations)

=== Robin Hood series ===
- Sherwood, 1991. Historical novel with fantasy elements.
- Robin and the King, 1993 (also published under the title Return to Nottingham: A Novel)
