= Wintermind =

1982 novel by Marvin Kaye

- First edition
- Author: Marvin Kaye and Parke Godwin
- Language: English
- Genre: Novel
- Publisher: Doubleday Books
- Publication date: 1982
- Publication place: United States
- Media type: Print (hardback)

Wintermind is the second novel of the Masters of Solitude trilogy, written by authors Marvin Kaye and Parke Godwin. The novel depicts a conflict between rural followers of a diseased mutant form of Christianity.
