= Pulphouse Publishing =

Defunct American specialty small press

Pulphouse Publishing was an American small press publisher based in Eugene, Oregon, and specializing in science fiction and fantasy. It was founded by Dean Wesley Smith and Kristine Kathryn Rusch in 1988. The press was active until 1996. Over that period, Pulphouse published 244 different titles.

== Pulphouse: The Hardback Magazine ==
From 1988 through 1993, Pulphouse published a quarterly magazine in hardback form edited by Rusch. In addition to twelve issues, each of them themed, they published an "issue 0" which was a hardcover filled with blank pages to use as a sample to show prospective buyers. Pulphouse included stories by notable science fiction and fantasy authors including Charles de Lint, Michael Bishop, Michael Swanwick, and Harlan Ellison. In addition, each issue included essays on a variety of subjects. In 1989, Smith and Rusch won the World Fantasy Award in the Special Award: Non Professional category for their work on Pulphouse. From 1992 through 1994, Pulphouse: The Hardback Magazine was nominated for the Hugo Award for Best Semiprozine.

The Best of Pulphouse: The Hardback Magazine was published by Tor Books in 1991 and collected stories which had already appeared in the magazine as well as stories which were slated for later publication.

== Pulphouse Weekly ==
In 1991, Pulphouse announced plans to publish a weekly fiction magazine, also called Pulphouse. Although they published 19 issues between 1991 and 1995, the magazine never achieved weekly status and after the fifth issue the subtitle was changed from A Weekly Magazine to A Fiction Magazine. Pulphouse Weekly was initially edited by Smith and later by Jonathan Bond. Over the course of its run, the magazine published stories by George Alec Effinger, Mike Resnick, Lawrence Watt-Evans, Andre Norton, O'Neil De Noux and Jeff VanderMeer. In addition to short stories, Pulphouse included serials by Spider & Jeanne Robinson and Robert Sheckley.

Starting with issue zero March 1, 1991, and running through issue 19. Issue 9 started giving a month, instead of a date, and Issues 15 through 19 were undated.

== Author's Choice Monthly ==
Smith edited a series of twenty-nine monthly chapbooks for Pulphouse under the collective title "Author's Choice Monthly" from 1989 through 1992. Each of these books were published in a limited edition and included stories by a single author. Authors in the series included Karl Edward Wagner (#2 Unthreatened by the Morning Light), Damon Knight (#21: God's Nose), and Esther Friesner (#23: It's Been Fun).

== Axolotl Press ==
In 1989, Pulphouse Publishing acquired Axolotl Press (founded by John Pelan in 1986) and began using it as an imprint. From 1989 through 1994, 26 titles were published using some form of the Axolotl name.

Series numbering seemed to begin with #09 and end with #30, there are two #16's printed in 1990. "Special editions" were also included.

== Other imprints ==
In addition to Axolotl, Pulphouse introduced Mystery Scene Press, which published a handful of mysteries in 1993, including the first two volumes in an Author's Choice series focused on mysteries. Pulphouse also used Writer's Notebook Press from 1990 through 1994 for four titles which focused on non-fictional aspects of the science fiction writing business.

=== Mystery Scene Press Author's Choice Monthly ===
(Single Author Collections) (Trade Paperback $5.95 Limited Cloth $25.00)

1. Deceptions by Marcia Muller
2. Stacked Deck by Bill Prozini
3. Opening Shots by Stuart M. Kaminsky
4. Mostly Murder by Joe Gores
5. Dark Whispers and Other Stories by Ed Gorman
6. Suspended Sentences by Brian Garfield

=== Mystery Scene Press Short Story Paperback ===
($1.95)

1. The People of the Peacock by Edward D. Hoch
2. Eight Mile and Dequindre by Loren D. Estleman
3. Lieutenant Harald and the Treasure Island Treasure & My Mother, My Daughter, Me by Margaret Maron
4. Cat's-Paw plus Incident in a Neighborhood Tavern by Bill Pronzini
5. Ride the Lightning by John Lutz
6. Afraid all the Time by Nancy Pickard
7. The Perfect Crime by Max Allen Collins
8. The Reason Why by Ed Gorman
9. Outlaw Blues by Teri White
10. My Heart Cries for You! by Bill Crider

== Legacy ==
Pulphouse collapsed after wildly over-expanding the number of titles published every year, including several commercially unviable lines (such as the Short Story Paperback/Hardback line), leaving at least one title (Harlan Ellison's Ellison Under Glass) paid for but undelivered.

In the Fall of 1996, Jerry Oltion published an anthology entitled Buried Treasures, subtitled "An Anthology of Unpublished Pulphouse Stories," which, with the approval of Rusch and Smith, was designed to look like an issue of Pulphouse Hardback.

Many of the authors who got their start publishing in Pulphouse publications or working for Rusch and Smith have gone on to have successful careers as science fiction and fantasy authors. Some authors who debuted in Pulphouse magazines include Adam-Troy Castro and Marina Fitch. Oltion and Nina Kiriki Hoffman were also closely connected to Pulphouse
