= Anthony Neil Smith =

Anthony Neil Smith is a mystery/crime fiction writer who has had short stories published in literary magazines and crime writing zines, and has also published novels. He is co-creator of the online noir journal Plots with Guns. He was also an associate editor with the literary magazine Mississippi Review, having put together several special issues featuring crime fiction for the online edition. He is a professor of English at Southwest Minnesota State University in Marshall, MN.

== Works ==
- Plots With Guns: A Noir Anthology (editor)
- Psychosomatic, published by Point Blank, with new edition from Down & Out Books (translated into Swedish)
- The Drummer, published by Two Dollar Radio, with new edition from Down & Out Books
- Yellow Medicine, published by Bleak House Books, with new edition from Down & Out Books (translated into Italian and French)
- Hogdoggin', published by Bleak House Books, with new edition from Down & Out Books (translated into French)
- All The Young Warriors, published by Blasted Heath, with new edition from Down & Out Books
- Once a Warrior, published by Blasted Heath, with new edition from Down & Out Books
- The Baddest Ass, published by Blasted Heath, with new edition from Down & Out Books
- Worm, published by Blasted Heath, with new edition from Down & Out Books
- Holy Death, published by Blasted Heath, with new edition from Down & Out Books
- Choke on Your Lies, self-published, later published by Down & Out Books
- Sin-Crazed Psycho Killer! Dive, Dive, Dive!, published by LA CASE Books 1 October 2013
- Castle Danger: Woman on Ice, published by BE Ebooks (translated into German)
- Castle Danger: The Mental States, published by BE Ebooks (translated into German)
- The Cyclist, published by BE Ebooks (translated into German)
- Slow Bear (novella), published by Fahrenheit Press
- Slower Bear (novella), published by Fahrenheit Press
- The Butcher's Prayer (novel), published by Fahrenheit Press
