= The Masters of Solitude =

1978 novel by Marvin Kaye

- cover of The Masters of Solitude
- Author: Marvin Kaye and Parke Godwin
- Cover artist: Emanuel Schongut
- Language: English
- Series: Masters of Solitude trilogy
- Genre: Science fiction
- Publisher: Doubleday
- Publication date: 1978
- Publication place: United States
- Media type: Print (hardcover)
- Pages: 397 pp
- ISBN: 0-385-12480-5
- Followed by: Wintermind

The Masters of Solitude is a 1978 science fiction novel written by Marvin Kaye and Parke Godwin. It initially appeared as a four-part serial in October 1977-May 1978 issues of the magazine Galileo, and was first published in book form in hardcover by Doubleday in July 1978. A Science Fiction Book Club edition followed from the same publisher in November of the same year. The first paperback edition was from Avon Books in July 1979. The first British edition was from Magnum, also in 1979. Later paperback editions were issued by Bantam Books in 1985 (U.S.) and Orbit/Futura in 1986 (U.K.).

The book is the first novel in what was apparently intended to be a trilogy of the same name. The second novel in the series is Wintermind, published in 1982. A third book by the same two authors, A Cold Blue Light, in 1983, is sometimes listed as the third novel of the trilogy, but is unrelated. Unattributed comments indicate that the authors wrote a conclusion which their publisher declined to publish.

== Plot summary ==
In the millennium after a global war, society in the former United States has splintered into groups. The main group in the story, the Coven, live in a pre-industrial Native American lifestyle, but one of growing population and power. Many members have mild telepathic powers, which opens the corridors of power to those capable of "lep". Lep allows the Coven to form larger social groups, but isolation from these groups drives one mad.

The other primary group, The City, retains their former technological lifestyle in the remains of the east coast megapolis. They spend their lives involved in immortal solitary scientific research, meeting rarely and communicating only when their research overlaps. The few thousand remaining City dwellers separate themselves from the "dirty" Coven through the use of the Self Gate, an electronic barrier that drives lesser minds insane. To prevent idle attempts to breach it, the City also employs a small mercenary army to act as a police force outside the Gate.

Although the Self Gate is designed to allow City folk to cross without issue, there is only one known example of this having happened. Judith Singer, a historian, learns that an ancient weapon known as the Girdle of Solitude is available in the ruins of a weapons laboratory in what was once Pennsylvania. She leaves the City in order to retrieve it, but soon after leaving she meets and falls in love with a young Coven man, Garrick. Garrick, heir to a wealthy apple-growing family of the Shando tribe, takes her as his wife.

Some years later Garrick is hit by lightning, and gains lep for the first time. Looking to marry political power with his family's fortune, Garrick leaves Judith to remarry into a powerful family. His combination of wealth and power quickly makes the Shando powerful among the Coven, and rapidly improves their style of life to that of the late 19th century. Judith is heartbroken and eventually dies years later, alone and embittered. She leaves behind their son, known simply as Singer, who lives a self-imposed life of solitude.

When rumours of the return of the plague reach the Shando, Garrick refuses to flee from the forests. Instead, he decides the era of isolation should end, and wants to open communications with the City. Standing between him is the mercenary army and the Self Gate. Garrick relies on two ideas to overcome the Gate. To approach the gate he will need to defeat the mercenary army protecting it, and decides to rally the disparate tribes of the Coven to build an army of his own. To attempt the Gate itself, he places his hope in the Girdle of Solitude that Judith told him about. And to achieve both of these goals he turns to Singer, who is rumored to have telepathic ability well beyond that of any Covener.

Singer is captured and returned to Garrick, after briefly displaying a terrifyingly powerful lep ability. He refuses to take part in the plans, and Garrick is forced to turn to his second son, Arin, in whom he places little faith and generally dismisses. Arin assembles a party and sets off on his mission of alliance building. The party eventually reaches a non-Covener group, the isolationist Kriss, a fundamentalist Christian sect who live in and around the coal mines of Pennsylvania. Trapped in the Kriss town over winter by bad weather, the party slowly goes mad due to isolation from the larger group, culture shock, and Arin being forced to poison one of his group to prevent her from being stoned to death for her fornication with a young male Kriss.

In the spring the survivors set out on the final leg of their journey, traveling to the abandoned city of Lishin. Here they are attacked by "the formless terror", diseased rats. They bite Arin's best friend, who dies a horrible death. His death and resulting complete isolation drives Arin insane. In the aftermath, Arin wanders Lishin and encounters a member of the Kriss using a syringe to collect plague from the glands of dead rats. Using his own lep he drives the man insane, and learns through him that the Kriss leader is herding the plague in order to kill the Covens using biological warfare. Moreover, the mercenary army is actually paid for and led by the Kriss, and the army is only nominally involved with City.

Arin returns to Shando and relates his story. Garrick responds by gathering his army and attacking the Kriss at night, sealing the men in the mines and murdering all the women and children. He buys off most of the mercenaries by giving them the Kriss coal mines. He then turns his army on the remaining group, led by the son of the Kriss leader. They initially divide his forces and send them reeling after using a number of ancient flame throwers found outside the city. Garrick regroups, and is aided by a turncoat mercenary general who helps carry the day.

Meanwhile, the Girdle has finally been retrieved by another Coven member and handed over to Arin, who turns it on and finds it to be a sort of invisibility device. He confronts the Gate and manages to make it through. Inside the City he is discovered and led to meet Judith's mother. He reveals that he is not Arin, but Singer. Singer had planted his own personality in Arin when they first met months earlier. It was the combination of the two personalities, Singer's self-loathing and Arin's youthful grandiosity evening each other out, that prevented the Gate from stopping him.

The story ends with the City providing a cure for the plague, meeting with Garrick, and ending the era of solitude. Garrick, unaware of his role in the events, gives up on Singer and banishes him. Arin and Singer meet some time later, and Arin asks why he refuses to take credit. Singer relates his hatred for Garrick, including the way that he ignored Arin, his little brother, simply for being the second son. He chose to make Arin the hero to correct this. He returns to his solitary life, the true Master of Solitude.
