= The Fire When It Comes =

1981 short story by Parke Godwin

"The Fire When It Comes" is a fantasy short story by American writer Parke Godwin. It was first published in the January 1981 issue of The Magazine of Fantasy & Science Fiction.

== Plot summary ==
A young couple rents an apartment that is haunted by the ghost of an actress.

== Reception ==
"The Fire When It Comes" won the 1982 World Fantasy Award for Best Novella, and was a finalist for the 1981 Nebula Award for Best Novelette and the 1982 Hugo Award for Best Novelette.

Kirkus Reviews considered it to be "dandy", judging it to be the best story in Godwin's 1984 identically-named collection The Fire When It Comes. Mike Ashley called it 'powerful'.
