= The Fair Folk =

- First edition
- Author: edited by Marvin Kaye
- Cover artist: J. P. Targete
- Language: English
- Genre: Fantasy, horror
- Publisher: Science Fiction Book Club
- Publication date: 2005
- Publication place: United States
- Media type: Print (hardback)
- Pages: viii, 328 pp
- ISBN: 1-58288-150-2
- OCLC: 57832440

The Fair Folk is an anthology of fantasy stories edited by Marvin Kaye. It was published by Science Fiction Book Club in January 2005. The anthology contains novelettes and novellas centered on fairies. The anthology itself won the 2006 World Fantasy Award for Best Anthology.

== Contents ==
- Introduction: Fairies Fearsome, Friendly and Funny, by Marvin Kaye
- "UOUS", by Tanith Lee
- "Grace Notes", by Megan Lindholm
- "The Gypsies in the Wood", by Kim Newman
- "The Kelpie", by Patricia A. McKillip
- "An Embarrassment of Elves", by Craig Shaw Gardner
- "Except the Queen", by Jane Yolen and Midori Snyder
- Afterword: Some Facts (?) About Fairies, by Marvin Kaye

== Reprints ==
- Ace Books, February 2007.
- Ace Books, December 2007.
