= Uncollected Stars =

First edition

Uncollected Stars is an anthology of 16 science fiction themed short stories collected from other publications. It was published in 1986 by Avon Books.

== Contents ==
- "Introduction" by Piers Anthony
- "Time Enough" by Lewis Padgett
- "The Soul-Empty Ones" by Walter M. Miller, Jr.
- "Defender of the Faith" by Alfred Coppel
- "All of You" by James V. McConnell
- "The Holes" by Michael Shaara
- "Beast in the House" by Michael Shaara
- "Little Boy" by Jerome Bixby
- "Unwillingly to School" by Pauline Ashwell
- "Brother Robot" by Henry Slesar
- "The Risk Profession" by Donald E. Westlake
- "The Stuff" by Henry Slesar
- "Arcturus Times Three" by Jack Sharkey
- "They Are Not Robbed" by Richard M. McKenna
- "The Creatures of Man" by Verge Foray
- "Only Yesterday" by Ted White
- "An Agent in Place" by Laurence M. Janifer
- "Afterword" by Barry N. Malzberg
