= John F. Dobbyn =

US writer and professor

John F. Dobbyn is an US mystery writer. He is also an emeritus professor at the Villanova University School of Law, Pennsylvania, in the fields of criminal, corporate, and insurance law.

== Education ==
He graduated from Harvard College (BA), Boston College Law School (JD), and Harvard Law School (LLM).

== Career ==
Dobbyn serviced in the US AIr Force before teaching law for forty-seven years. In 1981 he wrote the text book Insurance law in a nutshell (published by Thomson/West, Saint Paul, Minneapolis, fourth edition (2003) ISBN 9781628105391).

His writing career has included having published over twenty-five short fiction stories.

As a mystery writer, he is best known for his stories set in Boston and featuring the lawyer's Lex Devlin and Michael Knight. His Devlin and Knight short story "Trumpeter Swan" published in the February 2004 issue of Alfred Hitchcock's Mystery Magazine, was a finalist for the Shamus Award for Best Short Story from the Private Eye Writers of America.

His first Devlin and Knight novel, Neon Dragon, was published by University Press of New England in 2007.
