= Wicked Twist =

Short story by D. A. McGuire

"Wicked Twist" is the debut short story of American mystery writer D. A. McGuire. It was published in the November 1993 edition of Alfred Hitchcock's Mystery Magazine, and features a 12 year-old detective. The story won the Robert L. Fish Memorial Award from the Mystery Writers of America, and was republished in the 1994 edition of The Year's Best Mystery and Suspense Stories, edited by Edward D. Hoch. Publishers Weekly declared the short story to be among the best in the collection.

The author is a former high school science teacher from Massachusetts and, as of 2012, has published 24 stories in Alfred Hitchcock's Mystery Magazine, and several more in Ellery Queen's Mystery Magazine.
