= Edgar Awards =

Literary award for work in the crime genre

- Type: Mystery fiction awards
- Country: United States
- Established: 1946
- Website: theedgars.com

The Edgar Awards are presented every year by the Mystery Writers of America which is based in New York City. Named after American writer Edgar Allan Poe (1809–1849), a pioneer in the genre, the awards honor the best in mystery fiction, non-fiction, television, film, and theater published or produced in the previous year.

== Active author categories ==
=== Robert L. Fish Memorial Award ===
The Robert L. Fish Memorial Award was established in 1984 to honor the best first mystery short story by an American author. The winners are listed below.

Robert L. Fish Memorial Award winners
| Year | Author | Title | Publication | Ref. |
|---|---|---|---|---|
| 1993 | D. A. McGuire | "Wicked Twist" | Alfred Hitchcock's Mystery Magazine | |
| 2008 | Mark Ammons | "The Catch" | Still Waters | |
| 2009 | Joseph Guglielmelli | "Buckner's Error" | Queens Noir | |
| 2010 | Dan Warthman | "A Dreadful Day" | Alfred Hitchcock's Mystery Magazine | |
| 2011 | Evan Lewis | "Skyler Hobbs and the Rabbit Man" | Ellery Queen's Mystery Magazine | |
| 2012 | David Ingram | "A Good Man of Business" | Ellery Queen's Mystery Magazine | |
| 2013 | Patricia Smith | "When They Are Done With Us" | Staten Island Noir | |
| 2014 | Jeff Soloway | "The Wentworth Letter" | Criminal Element's Malfeasance Occasional | |
| 2015 | Zoe Z. Bell | "Getaway Girl" | Ellery Queen's Mystery Magazine | |
| 2016 | Russell W. Johnson | "Chung Ling Soo's Greatest Trick" | Ellery Queen's Mystery Magazine | |
| 2017 | E. Gabriel Flores | "The Truth of the Moment" | Ellery Queen's Mystery Magazine | |
| 2018 | Lisa D. Gray | "The Queen of Secrets" | | |
| 2019 | Nancy Novick | "How Does He Die This Time?" | | |
| 2020 | Derrick Harriell | "There’s a Riot Goin' On" | Milwaukee Noir | |
| 2021 | Colette Bancroft | "The Bite" | Tampa Bay Noir | |
| 2022 | Rob Osler | "Analogue" | Ellery Queen's Mystery Magazine | |
| 2023 | Mark Harrison | "Dogs in the Canyon" | Ellery Queen's Mystery Magazine | |
| 2024 | Kate Hohl | "The Body in Cell Two" | Ellery Queen's Mystery Magazine, May–June 2023 | |
| 2025 | Anna Stolley Persky | “The Jews on Elm Street” | Ellery Queen’s Mystery Magazine, September-October 2024 | |
| 2026 | Billie Kay Fern | "How It Happened" | Ellery Queen Mystery Magazine, July-August 2025 | |

=== Lilian Jackson Braun Award ===
The Lilian Jackson Braun Award, established in 2022 in honor of Lilian Jackson Braun, is presented for the "best full-length, contemporary cozy mystery."

Lilian Jackson Braun Award winners
| Year | Author | Title | Ref. |
|---|---|---|---|
| 2023 | Tamara Berry | Buried in a Good Book | |
| 2024 | Danielle Arceneaux | Glory Be | |
| 2025 | Katarina Bivald | The Murders in Great Diddling | |
| 2026 | Gwen Florio | A Senior Citizen's Guide to Life on the Run | |

=== G. P. Putnam's Sons Sue Grafton Memorial Award ===
The G. P. Putnam's Sons Sue Grafton Memorial Award was established in 2019 to honor Sue Grafton and is presented to "the best novel in a series featuring a female protagonist."

=== Grand Master Award ===
The Edgar Allan Poe Grand Master Award was established in 1955. The award "acknowledges important contributions to the genre as well as for a body of work that is both significant and of consistent high quality."

The Grand Master Award winners follow:

- 1955: Agatha Christie
- 1958: Vincent Starrett
- 1959: Rex Stout
- 1961: Ellery Queen
- 1962: Erle Stanley Gardner
- 1963: John Dickson Carr
- 1964: George Harmon Coxe
- 1966: Georges Simenon
- 1967: Baynard Kendrick
- 1969: John Creasey
- 1970: James M. Cain
- 1971: Mignon G. Eberhart
- 1972: John D. MacDonald
- 1973: Alfred Hitchcock, Judson Philips
- 1974: Ross Macdonald
- 1975: Eric Ambler
- 1976: Graham Greene
- 1978: Daphne du Maurier, Dorothy B. Hughes, Ngaio Marsh
- 1979: Aaron Marc Stein
- 1980: W. R. Burnett
- 1981: Stanley Ellin
- 1982: Julian Symons
- 1983: Margaret Millar
- 1984: John le Carré
- 1985: Dorothy Salisbury Davis
- 1986: Ed McBain
- 1987: Michael Gilbert
- 1988: Phyllis A. Whitney
- 1989: Hillary Waugh
- 1990: Helen McCloy
- 1991: Tony Hillerman
- 1992: Elmore Leonard
- 1993: Donald E. Westlake
- 1994: Lawrence Block
- 1995: Mickey Spillane
- 1996: Dick Francis
- 1997: Ruth Rendell
- 1998: Elizabeth Peters
- 1999: P. D. James
- 2000: Mary Higgins Clark
- 2001: Edward D. Hoch
- 2002: Robert B. Parker
- 2003: Ira Levin
- 2004: Joseph Wambaugh
- 2005: Marcia Muller
- 2006: Stuart Kaminsky
- 2007: Stephen King
- 2008: Bill Pronzini
- 2009: James Lee Burke, Sue Grafton
- 2010: Dorothy Gilman
- 2011: Sara Paretsky
- 2012: Martha Grimes
- 2013: Ken Follett, Margaret Maron
- 2014: Robert Crais, Carolyn Hart
- 2015: Lois Duncan, James Ellroy
- 2016: Walter Mosley
- 2017: Max Allan Collins, Ellen Hart
- 2018: Jane Langton, William Link, Peter Lovesey
- 2019: Martin Cruz Smith
- 2020: Barbara Neely
- 2021: Jeffery Deaver
- 2021: Charlaine Harris
- 2022: Laurie R. King
- 2023: Michael Connelly, Joanne Fluke
- 2024: Katherine Hall Page, R. L. Stine
- 2025: Laura Lippman, John Sandford
- 2026: Donna Andrews, Lee Child

=== Raven Award ===
The Raven Award was established in 1953 to honor "outstanding achievement in the mystery field outside of the realm of creative writing."

=== Ellery Queen Award ===
The Ellery Queen Award was established in 1983 "to honor outstanding writing teams and outstanding people in the mystery-publishing industry." The winners are listed below.

| Year | Author | Information | Ref. |
|---|---|---|---|
| 2010 | Barbara Peters and Robert Rosenwald | Poisoned Pen Press | |
| 2012 | Joe Meyers | Connecticut Post/Hearst Media News Group | |
| 2013 | Akashic Books | American book publisher | |
| 2015 | Charles Ardai | Co-founder of Hard Case Crime | |
| 2016 | Janet Rudolph | Founder of Mystery Readers International | |
| 2017 | Neil Nyren | Executive VP, associate publisher, and editor in chief of G.P. Putnam's Sons | |
| 2019 | Linda Landrigan | Editor of Alfred Hitchcock's Mystery Magazine | |
| 2021 | Reagan Arthur | | |
| 2022 | Juliet Grames | Soho Press – Soho Crime | |
| 2023 | The Strand Magazine | | |
| 2024 | Michaela Hamilton | Kensington Books | |
| 2025 | Peter Wolverton | St. Martin’s Press | |
| 2026 | John Scognamiglio | Kensington Books | |

=== Simon & Schuster Mary Higgins Clark Award ===
The Simon & Schuster Mary Higgins Clark Award was established in 2001.

== Active story categories ==
=== Fact Crime ===
The Edgar Allan Poe Award for Best Fact Crime was established in 1948.

=== Critical/Biographical Work ===
The Edgar Allan Poe Award for Best Critical/Biographical Work was established in 1977.

=== Novel ===
The Edgar Allan Poe Award for Best Novel was established in 1954.

=== Paperback or eBook Original ===
The Edgar Allan Poe Award for Best Paperback Original was established in 1970.

=== First Novel ===
The Edgar Allan Poe Award for Best First Novel was established in 1946.

=== Young Adult Novel ===
The Edgar Allan Poe Award for Best Young Adult Novel was established in 1989.

=== Juvenile ===
The Edgar Allan Poe Award for Best Juvenile was established in 1961.

=== Short Story ===
The Edgar Allan Poe Award for Best Short Story was established in 1951.

=== Episode in a Television Series ===
The Edgar Allan Poe Award for Best Episode in a TV Series was established in 1952.

== Discontinued categories ==
=== Book Jacket ===
The Edgar Allan Poe Award for Best Book Jacket was established in 1955 and discontinued in 1975.

=== Foreign Film ===
The Edgar Allan Poe Award for Best Foreign Film was established in 1949 and discontinued in 1966.

=== Motion Picture Screenplay ===
The Edgar Allan Poe Award for Best Motion Picture Screenplay was established in 1946 and discontinued in 2009.

=== Mystery Criticism ===
The Edgar Allan Poe Award for Outstanding Mystery Criticism was established in 1946 and discontinued in 1967.

=== Play ===
The Edgar Allan Poe Award for Best Play was established in 1950 and is irregular.

=== Radio Drama ===
The Edgar Allan Poe Award for Best Radio Drama was established in 1946 and discontinued in 1960.

=== Special Award ===
The Edgar Allan Poe Special Award was established in 1949 and is irregular.

=== Television Feature or Miniseries ===
The Edgar Allan Poe Award for Best Television Feature or Miniseries was established in 1972 and discontinued in 2007.

== See also ==
- Edogawa Rampo Prize
