= Martin Limón =

American novelist

- Born: November 21, 1948 (age 77)
- Occupation: Author
- Relatives: José Limón (uncle)
- Writing career
- Genre: Mystery
- Notable works: Sueño and Bascom series
- Website: martinlimon.com

Martin Limón (born November 21, 1948) is an American writer of mystery fiction. He is the author of 16 books in the Sueño and Bascom series, including Jade Lady Burning and the short story collection Nightmare Range, inspired by his time in Korea.

== Biography ==
Limón retired from military service after twenty years in the United States Army, including ten years in South Korea in five tours starting 1968. Similar to his main character Sueño, Limón extensively studied Korean language, taking night classes at the University of Maryland Far East Division alongside civilian workers and foreign spouses during his time in Korea and claiming he earned the most credits in the Korean language for a U.S. soldier at the time. Unlike Sueño, he was never a CID officer and calls his career "exceedingly undistinguished," working in many odd jobs, writing for Stars and Stripes, serving as an artillery gun crew chief, working in military intelligence, managing an NCO club and even earning extra money by learning card counting. He lives near Seattle.

== Published works ==
=== The Sueño and Bascom Novels ===
1. Jade Lady Burning (1992) ISBN 9780939149711
2. Slicky Boys (1997) ISBN 978-1-56947-385-6
3. Buddha's Money (1998) ISBN 978-1-56947-399-3
4. The Door to Bitterness (2005) ISBN 978-1-56947-404-4
5. The Wandering Ghost (2007) ISBN 978-1-56947-481-5
6. G.I. Bones (2009) ISBN 978-1-56947-603-1
7. Mr. Kill (2011) ISBN 978-1-56947-934-6
8. The Joy Brigade (2012) ISBN 978-1-61695-148-1
9. Nightmare Range (2013) ISBN 978-1616953348 - Short story collection
10. The Iron Sickle (2014) ISBN 978-1-61695-391-1
11. The Ville Rat (2015) ISBN 978-1-61695-608-0
12. Ping-Pong Heart (2016) ISBN 978-1-61695-713-1
13. The Nine-Tailed Fox (2017) ISBN 978-1-61695-8237
14. The Line (October 2018) ISBN 978-1-61695-966-1
15. GI Confidential (October 2019) ISBN 978-1641290388
16. War Women (November 2021) ISBN 978-1-641292795
