= Heartbreak Hospital =

- Directed by: Ruedi Gerber
- Screenplay by: Ruedi Gerber; Henry Slesar
- Based on: Heartbreak Hospital by Henry Slesar
- Produced by: Ram Bergman; Lemore Syvan; Ruedi Gerber; Dana Lustig
- Starring: Patricia Clarkson
- Cinematography: Wolfgang Held
- Edited by: Sabine Krayenbuhl
- Music by: John Davis
- Production companies: Bergman Lustig Productions; Goldheart Pictures; ZAS Films
- Distributed by: Seventh Art Releasing
- Release date: September 6, 2002 (New York City)
- Running time: 91 minutes
- Country: United States
- Language: English

Heartbreak Hospital is a 2002 American thriller comedy film directed by Ruedi Gerber and starring Patricia Clarkson. It is based on the novel of the same name by Henry Slesar.

== Cast ==
- Chelsea Altman as Neely
- Patricia Clarkson as Lottie
- Diane Venora as Sunday
- John Shea as Milo
- Demián Bichir as Tonio

== Reception ==
The film has a 25% rating on Rotten Tomatoes.
