= The Wolfe Pack =

Literary society

The Wolfe Pack is a literary society devoted to Rex Stout's character Nero Wolfe.

== History ==
As publicity for William S. Baring-Gould's book Nero Wolfe of West 35th Street, Viking Press ran a "Mammoth New Nero Wolfe Contest" in The New York Times Book Review. Four years later, John McAleer began working on what would become Rex Stout: A Biography. McAleer obtained the contest mailing list and began correspondence with one of the fans, Ellen Krieger. Krieger desired to form a literary society devoted to Wolfe and McAleer provided the name: The Wolfe Pack.

The first Nero Wolfe dinner was held in 1977 at The Lotus Club in New York City. The dinner, entitled "Maitre D'tective: Rex Stout," honored John McAleer and his book Rex Stout: A Biography, recently published by Little, Brown and Company. There were 131 guests who included Otto Penzler editor, publisher, and owner of The Mysterious Bookshop which would open two years after the dinner; Eleanor Sullivan, then-editor of Ellery Queen's Mystery Magazine; and Dilys Winn, founder of Murder Ink, the West Side mystery bookstore that sponsored the dinner.

At the dinner, guests received a questionnaire to determine interest in an ongoing Wolfe Pack society. Six months later the society was born.

Over the course of the numerous novels and short stories, Rex Stout gave numerous addresses for Wolfe's brownstone. In 1996, The Wolfe Pack investigated the issue and found that only one possibility matched the description given in the stories: 454 West 35th Street. With the aid of the New York City Department of Parks and Recreation, the group had a commemorative plaque placed at the address.

"On this site stood the elegant brownstone of the corpulent fictional private detective Nero Wolfe. With his able assistant Archie Goodwin, Mr. Wolfe raised orchids and dined well, while solving over seventy cases as recorded by Rex Stout from 1934 to 1975."

== Activities ==
The Wolfe Pack holds an annual Black Orchid Banquet, at which the Nero Award and the Black Orchid Novella Award are presented.

== Publications ==
The group publishes a journal, The Gazette: the Journal of the Wolfe Pack, which is distributed to members. Marvin Kaye compiled selected articles and fiction from The Gazette into two books, The Nero Wolfe Files and The Archie Goodwin Files.
