= Adventure Tales =

American magazine published by Wildside Press

Adventure Tales is an irregularly published magazine that reprints classic stories from pulp magazines of the early 20th century. It is edited by science fiction writer John Gregory Betancourt and published by Wildside Press. In 2011 it was published biannually. Each issue has a theme or a featured author related to pulp magazines. Its headquarters is in Rockville, Maryland.

Issue #1 (2006) featured prolific pulp writer Hugh B. Cave.

Contents: "Skulls," by H. Bedford Jones; "Under the Flame Trees," by H. de Vere Stacpoole; "Rats Ashore," by Charles C. Young; "The Evil Eye," by Vincent Starrett; "Watson!" by Captain A. E. Dingle; "Island Feud," by Hugh B. Cave; "The Man Who Couldn't Die," by Hugh B. Cave;

Issue #2 (2006) featured pulp writer Nelson Bond.

Includes work by Dorothy Quick, Achmed Abdullah, John D. Swain, Christopher B. Booth, Harold Lamb, Nelson Bond, and Arthur O. Friel.

Issue #3 (2006) featured pulp writer Murray Leinster.

Other contents includes: "Land Sharks and Others," by H. Bedford-Jones; "Light on a Subject," by Raymond S. Spears; "Channa's Tabu," by Harold Lamb; "Forbidden Fruit," by John D. Swain; "Kill That Headline," by Robert Leslie Bellem; "The Floating Island," by Philip M. Fisher; Africa," by George Allan England. A special book-paper edition included extra content: "Nerve" and "The Street of Magnificent Dreams," by Murray Leinster; "The Moon-Calves," by Raymond S. Spears; and "Pirates' Gold," by H. Bedford-Jones.

Issue #4 (2007) featured pulp writers associated with Weird Tales magazine.

Contents: "The Monkey God," by Seabury Quinn; "Double-Shuffle," by Edwin Baird; "Every Man a King," by E. Hoffmann Price; "Blind Man's Bluff," by Edwin Baird; "The Mad Detective," by John D. Swain; "Son of the White wolf," by Robert E. Howard; "Adventure," by Clark Ashton Smith (verse); "Astrophobos," by H.P. Lovecraft (verse); "Always Comes Evening," by Robert E. Howard (verse)

Issue #5 (2008) featured pulp writer Achmed Abdullah.

Contents: "Their Own Dear Land," by Achmed Abdullah; "The Pearls of Paruki," by J. Allan Dunn; "The Midmatch Tragedy," by Vincent Starrett; "The Remittance Woman," by Achmed Abdullah.

Issue #6 (2010) featured pulp writer H. Bedford-Jones.

Contents: "The Fugitive Statue," by Vincent Starrett; "Miracle," by John D. Swain; "Mustered Out," by H. Beford-Jones; "The Devil's Heirloom," by Anthony M. Rud; "The Tapir," by Arthur O. Friel; "Thubway Tham's Dog," by Johnston McCulley; "The Badman's Brand," by H. Bedford-Jones; "Lancelot Biggs Cooks a Pirate," by Nelson S. Bond; "Surprise in Sulphur Springs," by Bedford-Jones; "Payable to Bearer," by Talbot Mundy; plus a facsimile reprint of the first issue of AMRA, the fantasy fanzine.
