= The Heart of the Warrior =

Book by John Gregory Betancourt

- Author: John Gregory Betancourt
- Language: English
- Series: Star Trek: Deep Space Nine
- Genre: Science fiction novel
- Publisher: Pocket Books
- Publication date: October 1996
- Publication place: United States
- Media type: Print (paperback)
- Pages: 274 pp
- ISBN: 0-671-88560-X (first edition, paperback)
- OCLC: 31315098
- Preceded by: Time's Enemy
- Followed by: Saratoga

The Heart of the Warrior is a Star Trek: Deep Space Nine novel written by John Gregory Betancourt.

In Voyages of Imagination, Betancourt remarked, "Worf has always been one of my favorite characters, and I wanted to write a book about him but set in the Dominion, where he would find a challenge to his hand-to-hand combat skills. Unfortunately, later seasons of DS9 developed the Founders and Dominion enough that my book is, ah, retroactively contradictory to the official universe in a number of places. Which is too bad because I think it's my best Trek novel."

== Plot ==
A crucial peace conference fills Deep Space Nine with intrigue. At the same time, Kira and Worf take a mission into enemy territory to discover the secrets of the chemical that controls the highly dangerous Jem'Hadar warriors. Odo may be their only hope of survival but he'll have to fight against his own people.
