= List of Übel Blatt chapters =

Übel Blatt is a Japanese manga series written and illustrated by Etorouji Shiono. It began serialization in the semi-monthly Young Gangan in December 2004. It returned from a two-year hiatus in Monthly Big Gangan on December 24, 2011. The manga finished on March 25, 2019. Publisher Square Enix collected the chapters in 24 tankōbon volumes, beginning with volume 0 on July 25, 2005, and ending with volume 23 on June 25, 2019.

A side-story titled Übel Blatt Gaiden was published in Young Gangan Big on August 25, 2011. In February 2014, Yen Press announced they had licensed Übel Blatt for English release in North America. They published the series in omnibus format of two volumes in one, with volume 0 (Japanese volumes 0 and 1) released in October 2014, and the last (Japanese volumes 22 and 23) on December 17, 2019. The manga was published in France by Ki-oon, who released the first volume on May 24, 2007, and the last one on October 3, 2019.

A sequel, titled Übel Blatt II: The Knights of the Deceased King (ユーベルブラットII 死せる王の騎士団, Yūberu Buratto II: Shiseru Ō no Kishidan), began serialization in Monthly Big Gangan on February 24, 2024. Its chapters have been collected in four tankōbon volumes as of April 24, 2026. The sequel is published digitally in North America by Square Enix via their Manga Up! Global app. During their panel at Anime NYC 2026, Yen Press announced that they had also licensed the sequel for English publication.

== Volumes ==
=== Übel Blatt ===
No.	Original release date	Original ISBN	English release date	English ISBN
0	July 25, 2005	978-4-7575-1479-9	October 28, 2014	978-0-316-33616-1
001. "Schwarzes Schwert (Black Sword)" (《黒い剣》, Kuroi Ken); 002. "Der Blatt der Lüge (The Blade of Lies)" (《うその刃》, Uso no Ha); 003. "Der Preis von der Betrug (The Price of Deceit)" (《欺瞞の代償》, Giman no Daishō); Side Story: "Blatt Meister (Blade Master) Part 1" (《刃匠》前編, Hashō Zenpen); Side Story: "Blatt Meister (Blade Master) Part 2" (《刃匠》後編, Hashō Kōhen)
1	July 25, 2005	978-4-7575-1480-5	October 28, 2014	978-0-316-33616-1
004. "Durch bruch (Break Through) I" (《突破》・I, Toppa I); 005. "Durch bruch (Break Through) II" (《突破》・II, Toppa II); 006. "Durch bruch (Break Through) III" (《突破》・III, Toppa III); 007. "Durch bruch (Break Through) IV" (《突破》・IV, Toppa IV); 008. "Durch bruch (Break Through) V" (《突破》・V, Toppa V); 009. "Durch bruch (Break Through) VI" (《突破》・VI, Toppa VI); 010. "Durch bruch (Break Through) VII" (《突破》・VII, Toppa VII); 011. "Durch bruch (Break Through) VIII" (《突破》・VIII, Toppa VIII)
2	November 25, 2005	978-4-7575-1575-8	January 20, 2015	978-0-316-38048-5
012. "Unter Morgen Monde (Under the Morning Moons) I" (《残月の下で》・I, Zangetsu no Shita de I); 013. "Unter Morgen Monde (Under the Morning Moons) II" (《残月の下で》・II, Zangetsu no Shita de II); 014. "Langer Regen (The Long Rain) I" (《長い雨》・I, Nagai Ame I); 015. "Langer Regen (The Long Rain) II" (《長い雨》・II, Nagai Ame II); 016. "Langer Regen (The Long Rain) III" (《長い雨》・III, Nagai Ame III); 017. "Langer Regen (The Long Rain) IV" (《長い雨》・IV, Nagai Ame IV); 018. "Langer Regen (The Long Rain) V" (《長い雨》・V, Nagai Ame V); 019. "Langer Regen (The Long Rain) VI" (《長い雨》・VI, Nagai Ame VI); 020. "Nacht (Night) I" (《夜》・I, Yoru I)
3	March 25, 2006	978-4-7575-1643-4	January 20, 2015	978-0-316-38048-5
021. "Nacht (Night) II" (《夜》・II, Yoru II); 022. "Nacht (Night) III" (《夜》・III, Yoru III); 023. "Köinzell" (《ケインツェル》, Keinteru); 024. "Die Burg vom Helden (The Castle of the Hero) I" (《英雄の城》・I, Eiyū no Shiro I); 025. "Die Burg vom Helden (The Castle of the Hero) II" (《英雄の城》・II, Eiyū no Shiro II); 026. "Die Burg vom Helden (The Castle of the Hero) III" (《英雄の城》・III, Eiyū no Shiro III); 027. "Die Burg vom Helden (The Castle of the Hero) IV" (《英雄の城》・IV, Eiyū no Shiro IV); 028. "Die Burg vom Helden (The Castle of the Hero) V" (《英雄の城》・V, Eiyū no Shiro V); 029. "Die Burg vom Helden (The Castle of the Hero) VI" (《英雄の城》・VI, Eiyū no Shiro VI)
4	September 25, 2006	978-4-7575-1780-6	May 19, 2015	978-0-316-34039-7
030. "Die Burg vom Helden (The Castle of the Hero) VII" (《英雄の城》・VII, Eiyū no Shiro VII); 031. "Schtemwölech I" (《シュテムヴェレヒ》・I, Shutemuveruhi I); 032. "Schtemwölech II" (《シュテムヴェレヒ》・II, Shutemuveruhi II); 033. "Schtemwölech III" (《シュテムヴェレヒ》・III, Shutemuveruhi III); 034. "Schtemwölech IV" (《シュテムヴェレヒ》・IV, Shutemuveruhi IV); 035. "Schtemwölech V" (《シュテムヴェレヒ》・V, Shutemuveruhi V); 036. "In Dunkelheit (Into the Darkness)" (《闇の中へ》, Yami no Naka e); 037. "Der Leere Sarg (The Empty Coffin) I" (《空の棺》・I, Kara no Kan I); 038. "Der Leere Sarg (The Empty Coffin) II" (《空の棺》・II, Kara no Kan II)
5	March 24, 2007	978-4-7575-1970-1	May 19, 2015	978-0-316-34039-7
039. "Der Heldmörder (The Hero-Killer) I" (《英雄殺し》・I, Eiyūgoroshi I); 040. "Der Heldmörder (The Hero-Killer) II" (《英雄殺し》・II, Eiyūgoroshi II); 041. "Der Heldmörder (The Hero-Killer) III" (《英雄殺し》・III, Eiyūgoroshi III); 042. "Der Heldmörder (The Hero-Killer) IV" (《英雄殺し》・IV, Eiyūgoroshi IV); 043. "Der Heldmörder (The Hero-Killer) V" (《英雄殺し》・V, Eiyūgoroshi V); 044. "Der Heldmörder (The Hero-Killer) VI" (《英雄殺し》・VI, Eiyūgoroshi VI); 045. "Der Heldmörder (The Hero-Killer) VII" (《英雄殺し》・VII, Eiyūgoroshi VII); 046. "Der Heldmörder (The Hero-Killer) VIII" (《英雄殺し》・VIII, Eiyūgoroshi VIII); 047. "Für Meinen Helden (For My Hero)" (《英雄のために》, Eiyū no Tame ni)
6	September 25, 2007	978-4-7575-2121-6	September 22, 2015	978-0-316-34040-3
048. "Der Schatten des Blatts (The Shadow of the Blade)" (《刃の影》, Yaiba no Kage); 049. "Junge Blätter (Young Leaves) I" (《若葉》・I, Wakaba I); 050. "Junge Blätter (Young Leaves) II" (《若葉》・II, Wakaba II); 051. "Herz des Kämpfers (Heart of Warriors)" (《戦士の心》, Senshi no Kokoro); 052. "Gegenangriff (Counterattack)" (《反撃》, Hangeki); 053. "Schlag (Strike)" (《一撃》, Ichigeki); 054. "Unordnung (Confusion)" (《混乱》, Konran); 055. "Gefühl zu... (Before Feelings)" (《想いの先に》, Omoi no Saki ni); 056. "Belohnung für die tapferen Männer (Reward of the Hero)" (《勇者達の報酬》, Yūsha-tachi no Hōshū)
7	March 25, 2008	978-4-7575-2242-8	September 22, 2015	978-0-316-34040-3
057. "Keil (Wedge)" (《楔》, Kusabi); 058. "Barestar I" (《バレスター》・I, Baresutā I); 059. "Barestar II" (《バレスター》・II, Baresutā II); 060. "Neues Schwert (New Sword) I" (《新たなる剣》・I, Arata naru Ken I); 061. "Neues Schwert (New Sword) II" (《新たなる剣》・II, Arata naru Ken II); 062. "Neues Schwert (New Sword) III" (《新たなる剣》・III, Arata naru Ken III); 063. "Fahne (Flag)" (《旗》, Hata); 064. "Die Faust (The Fist)" (《拳》, Kobushi); 065. "Flamme (Flame)" (《炎》, Honō)
8	September 25, 2008	978-4-7575-2386-9	January 26, 2016	978-0-316-34041-0
066. "Wasserscheide (Watershed) I" (《分水嶺》・I, Bunsuirei I); 067. "Wasserscheide (Watershed) II" (《分水嶺》・II, Bunsuirei II); 068. "Wasserscheide (Watershed) III" (《分水嶺》・III, Bunsuirei III); 069. "Ein Kleines Blatt (A Small Blade)" (《小さな刃》, Chiisana Yaiba); 070. "Das Schwert des Feenminerals (The Fairytite Sword)" (《妖精鉱の剣》, Yōseikō no Ken); 071. "Ein Geheimer Kurs (A Secret Path)" (《隠された道》, Kakusareta Michi); 072. "Belagerung (Encirclement)" (《包囲》, Hōi); 073. "Heftiger Angriff (Fierce Attack)" (《強襲》, Kyōshū); 074. "Das Kommen (The Coming)" (《到達》, Tōtatsu)
9	March 25, 2009	978-4-7575-2514-6	January 26, 2016	978-0-316-34041-0
075. "Der Verlust (The Loss)" (《喪失》, Sōshitsu); 076. "Mein Herr (My Master)" (《主》, Aruji); 077. "Versprechen (Promise)" (《約束》, Yakusoku); 078. "Singstimme (Singing Voice)" (《歌声》, Utagoe); 079. "Tabu (Taboo)" (《禁忌》, Kinki); 080. "Die Wahrheit (The Truth)" (《真実》, Shinjitsu); 081. "Die Morgensonne (The Morning Sun)" (《朝陽》, Asahi); 082. "Der Gedanke, der Damit Gerschnitzt Wurde (The Engraved Feeling)" (《刻まれた想い》, Kizamareta Omoi); 083. "Grabsteine (Gravestones)" (《墓碑》, Bohi)
10	September 25, 2009	978-4-7575-2685-3	May 24, 2016	978-0-316-34043-4
084. "Erosion I" (《侵食》・I, Shinsoku I); 085. "Erosion II" (《侵食》・II, Shinsoku II); 086. "Erosion III" (《侵食》・III, Shinsoku III); 087. "Erosion IV" (《侵食》・IV, Shinsoku IV); 088. "Erosion V" (《侵食》・V, Shinsoku V); 089. "Erosion VI" (《侵食》・VI, Shinsoku VI); 090. "Erosion VII" (《侵食》・VII, Shinsoku VII); 091. "Erosion VIII" (《侵食》・VIII, Shinsoku VIII); 092. "Erosion IX" (《侵食》・IX, Shinsoku IX)
11	February 9, 2012	978-4-7575-3004-1	May 24, 2016	978-0-316-34043-4
093. "Sturz (Collapse) I" (《崩壊》・I, Hōkai I); 094. "Sturz (Collapse) II" (《崩壊》・II, Hōkai II); 095. "Sturz (Collapse) III" (《崩壊》・III, Hōkai III); 096. "Sturz (Collapse) IV" (《崩壊》・IV, Hōkai IV); 097. "Sturz (Collapse) V" (《崩壊》・V, Hōkai V); 098. "Sturz (Collapse) VI" (《崩壊》・VI, Hōkai VI); 099. "Die Träume (The Dream)" (《夢》, Yume)
12	September 25, 2012	978-4-7575-3740-8	September 20, 2016	978-0-316-34044-1
100. "Die Unbesiegte (The Undefeated)" (《無敗の男》, Muhai no Otoko); 101. "Die Brüder (The Brothers) I" (《兄弟達》I, Kyōdai-tachi I); 102. "Die Brüder (The Brothers) II" (《兄弟達》II, Kyōdai-tachi II); 103. "Föllunglogahe" (《フェルングロガーエ》, Ferungurogāe); 104. "Drachenkorridor (Dragon's Corridor)" (《竜の回廊》, Ryū no Kairō); 105. "Himmelsspeer (Spear of the Heavens)" (《天の槍》, Ten no Yari)
13	March 25, 2013	978-4-7575-3910-5	September 20, 2016	978-0-316-34044-1
106. "Die Helden (The Heroes) I" (《英雄達》I, Eiyū-tachi I); 107. "Die Helden (The Heroes) II" (《英雄達》II, Eiyū-tachi II); 108. "Die Helden (The Heroes) III" (《英雄達》III, Eiyū-tachi III); 109. "Die Helden (The Heroes) IV" (《英雄達》IV, Eiyū-tachi IV); 110. "Die Helden (The Heroes) V" (《英雄達》V, Eiyū-tachi V)
14	October 25, 2013	978-4-7575-4100-9	December 20, 2016	978-0-316-26169-2
111. "Die Helden (The Heroes) VI" (《英雄達》VI, Eiyū-tachi VI); 112. "Die Helden (The Heroes) VII" (《英雄達》VII, Eiyū-tachi VII); 113. "Die Helden (The Heroes) VIII" (《英雄達》VIII, Eiyū-tachi VIII); 114. "Die Helden (The Heroes) IX" (《英雄達》IX, Eiyū-tachi IX); 115. "Die Helden (The Heroes) X" (《英雄達》X, Eiyū-tachi X)
15	April 25, 2014	978-4-7575-4258-7	December 20, 2016	978-0-316-26169-2
116. "Mein Vater (My Father)" (《父》, Chichi); 117. "Winterende (Winter's End)" (《冬の終わり》, Fuyu no Owari); 118. "Neuer König (New King)" (《新たなる王》, Arata naru Ō); 119. "Sohn eines Königs (Son of a King)" (《王の息子》, Ō no Musuko); 120. "Loyalität (Loyalty)" (《忠誠》, Chūsei); 121. "Mein Meister (My Master)" (《我が主》, Waga Aruji)
16	November 25, 2014	978-4-7575-4478-9	March 21, 2017	978-0-316-43564-2
122. "Hände des Ärgers (Hands of Anger)" (《怒りの手》, Ikari no Te); 123. "Ein großer Wohltäter (A Great Benefactor)" (《大恩ある人》, Daion Aru Hito); 124. "Versuchung der Macht (Temptation Toward Power)" (《力の誘惑》, Chikara no Yūwaku); 125. "Stelle alter Leute (Land of Precursors)" (《先人の地》, Senjin no Chi); 126. "Jagd (Hunt)" (《狩り》, Kari); 127. "Meister (Master)" (《師》, Shi)
17	May 25, 2015	978-4-7575-4648-6	March 21, 2017	978-0-316-43564-2
128. "Helligkeit des Schwertes (Sword's Brightness)" (《剣の輝き》, Ken no Kagayaki); 129. "Eine Burg und Eine Burg (A Castle and Another) I" (《城と城》I, Shiro to Shiro I); 130. "Eine Burg und Eine Burg (A Castle and Another) II" (《城と城》II, Shiro to Shiro II); 131. "Eine Burg und Eine Burg (A Castle and Another) III" (《城と城》III, Shiro to Shiro III); 132. "Eine Burg und Eine Burg (A Castle and Another) IV" (《城と城》IV, Shiro to Shiro IV); 133. "Eine Burg und Eine Burg (A Castle and Another) V" (《城と城》V, Shiro to Shiro V)
18	May 25, 2016	978-4-7575-4989-0	August 22, 2017	978-0-316-43565-9
134. "Schwert des Reiches (Sword of the Empire) I" (《帝国の剣》I, Teikoku no Ken I); 135. "Schwert des Reiches (Sword of the Empire) II" (《帝国の剣》II, Teikoku no Ken II); 136. "Die Rückkehr (The Return)" (《帰還》, Kikan); 137. "Das Kleine Verbrechen (A Small Crime)" (《小さな罪》, Chiisana Tsumi); 138. "Neue Welt (New World)" (《新しき世界》, Atarashiki Sekai); 139. "Doppelte Blattmeister (Two Blatt Meisters)" (《二人の刀匠》, Futari no Tōshō); 140. "Flügelzerstörer (Wingbreaker)" (《翼を折るもの》, Tsubasa o Oru Mono)
19	December 24, 2016	978-4-7575-5192-3	August 22, 2017	978-0-316-43565-9
141. "Mission vom Kaiser (Emperor's Mission)" (《皇帝の言葉》, Kōtei no Kotoba); 142. "Fahnen der Helden (Flag of the Hero) I" (《英雄の旗》I, Eiyū no Hata I); 143. "Fahnen der Helden (Flag of the Hero) II" (《英雄の旗》II, Eiyū no Hata II); 144. "Fahnen der Helden (Flag of the Hero) III" (《英雄の旗》III, Eiyū no Hata III); 145. "Fahnen der Helden (Flag of the Hero) IV" (《英雄の旗》IV, Eiyū no Hata IV); 146. "Fahnen der Helden (Flag of the Hero) V" (《英雄の旗》V, Eiyū no Hata V)
20	July 25, 2017	978-4-7575-5420-7	September 18, 2018	978-0-316-41410-4
147. "Blut und Blut (Blood and Blood)" (《血と血》, Chi to Chi); 148. "Meine Hoffnung (My Hope)" (《希望》, Kibō); 149. "Könige (Kings)" (《王達》, Ō-tachi); 150. "Schwarz gekleidete Mädchen (Black-Garbed Girl)" (《黒衣の少女》, Kokui no Shōjo); 151. "Das Tor zur Hauptstadt des Königs (The Gate to the King's Capital) I" (《王都前門》I, Ōto Zenmon I); 152. "Das Tor zur Hauptstadt des Königs (The Gate to the King's Capital) II" (《王都前門》II, Ōto Zenmon II)
21	February 24, 2018	978-4-7575-5635-5	September 18, 2018	978-0-316-41410-4
153. "Das Tor zur Hauptstadt des Königs (The Gate to the King's Capital) III" (《王都前門》III, Ōto Zenmon III); 154. "Das Tor zur Hauptstadt des Königs (The Gate to the King's Capital) IV" (《王都前門》IV, Ōto Zenmon IV); 155. "Alter Freund (Old Friend) I" (《古き友》I, Furuki Tomo I); 156. "Alter Freund (Old Friend) II" (《古き友》II, Furuki Tomo II); 157. "Alter Freund (Old Friend) III" (《古き友》III, Furuki Tomo III); 158. "Alter Freund (Old Friend) IV" (《古き友》IV, Furuki Tomo IV)
22	September 25, 2018	978-4-7575-5857-1	December 17, 2019	978-1-9753-0614-4
159. "Alter Freund (Old Friend) V" (《古き友》V, Furuki Tomo V); 160. "Das Schloß des neuen Königs (The New King's Castle) I" (《新しき王の城》I, Atarashiki Ō no Shiro I); 161. "Das Schloß des neuen Königs (The New King's Castle) II" (《新しき王の城》II, Atarashiki Ō no Shiro II); 162. "Das Schloß des neuen Königs (The New King's Castle) III" (《新しき王の城》III, Atarashiki Ō no Shiro III); 163. "Das Schloß des neuen Königs (The New King's Castle) IV" (《新しき王の城》IV, Atarashiki Ō no Shiro IV); 164. "Das Ende der Welt (Demise) I" (《終焉》I, Shūen I)
23	June 25, 2019	978-4-7575-6171-7	December 17, 2019	978-1-9753-0614-4
165. "Das Ende der Welt (Demise) II" (《終焉》II, Shūen II); 166. "Das Ende der Welt (Demise) III" (《終焉》III, Shūen III); 167. "Das Ende der Welt (Demise) IV" (《終焉》IV, Shūen IV); 168. "Das Ende der Welt (Demise) V" (《終焉》V, Shūen V); 169. "Das Ende der Welt (Demise) VI" (《終焉》VI, Shūen VI); 170. "Eine neue Ära (A New Era)" (《新たなる時代》, Atarata naru Jidai)

=== Übel Blatt II: The Knights of the Deceased King ===
No.	Original release date	Original ISBN	English release date	English ISBN
1	December 24, 2024	978-4-7575-9588-0	February 23, 2027	979-8-8554-4987-7
001. "Säbeltanz (Saber Dance)"; 002. "Abfahrt (Departure)"; 003. "Dämonenbestienberge (Demon-Beast Mountains)"; 004. "Schwert des Totenkönigs (Sword of the Fallen King)"
2	March 25, 2025	978-4-7575-9772-3	—	—
3	August 25, 2025	978-4-301-00024-2	—	—
4	April 24, 2026	978-4-301-00482-0	—	—
