= Donna Moore (novelist) =

Scottish novelist

Donna Moore (born 1962) is a Scottish novelist. Her first published book ...Go to Helena Handbasket won the 2007 Left Coast Crime Lefty Award for best humorous mystery of the year. Her second novel, Old Dogs, followed in 2010.

== Novels ==
- ...Go to Helena Handbasket (2007)
- Old Dogs (2010)
