= Wildside Press =

American independent publishing company

- Founded: 1989; 37 years ago
- Founder: John Gregory Betancourt; Kim Betancourt
- Country of origin: United States
- Headquarters location: Rockville, Maryland
- Distribution: Diamond Book Distributors
- Key people: John Gregory Betancourt; Kim Betancourt
- Publication types: Audiobooks, CDs, Books, E-books, Magazines
- Fiction genres: Science fiction, fantasy, mysteries, speculative fiction, romance, non-fiction
- Imprints: Borgo Press, Cosmos Books, Point Blank
- Official website: www.wildsidepress.com

Wildside Press is an independent publishing company in Cabin John, Maryland. It was founded in 1989 by John Betancourt and Kim Betancourt. While the press was originally conceived as a publisher of speculative fiction in both trade and limited editions, its focus has broadened since then, both in content and format.

Its website notes publication of works of mystery, romance, science fiction, fantasy, and non-fiction, as well as downloadable audiobooks and CDs, ebooks, magazines, and physical books. Wildside Press has published approximately 10,000 books through print on demand and traditional means.

== Writers ==
The company has published work by a number of contemporary writers, including Lloyd Biggle Jr., Alan Dean Foster, Paul Di Filippo, Esther Friesner, S. T. Joshi, Ionuț Caragea, Michael Kurland, Paul Levinson, David Langford, Nick Mamatas, Brian McNaughton, Vera Nazarian, Paul Park, Tim Pratt, Stephen Mark Rainey, Alan Rodgers, Darrell Schweitzer, Lawrence Watt-Evans, and Chelsea Quinn Yarbro.

In addition to newer writers, the company works at keeping established older authors in print, such as James Branch Cabell, H. Rider Haggard, and Clark Ashton Smith, as well as lesser known scribes like R. A. Lafferty. The publisher has a specialty reprint project, reproducing old issues of such pulp magazines as The Phantom Detective, Secret Agent X, and Spider.

Wildside Press has also published Robert E. Howard's ten book series called Weird Works, which comprises Howard's entire body of collected work published in the pulp magazine Weird Tales, and restored to the original magazine texts.

== Imprints ==
- Borgo Press
- Cosmos Books
- Point Blank

== Magazines ==
=== Current ===
- Adventure Tales
- Black Cat Mystery Magazine
- Sherlock Holmes Mystery Magazine
- Weirdbook

=== Defunct ===
- Cat Tales: The Magazine of Fantastic Feline Fiction
- H. P. Lovecraft's Magazine of Horror
- Strange Tales
- Underworlds: The Magazine of Noir and Dark Suspense
- Weird Tales

== Ebooks ==
In addition to selling ebooks via its website and other booksellers', Wildside Press maintains a "Freebies" page on which it sells both permanent and weekly free selections. The weekly freebies are typically either "megapack" or "minipack" compilations.
