= O'Neil De Noux =

O’Neil De Noux is an American novelist and short story writer.

De Noux is the 2020 and 2007 Shamus Award Winner for Best Private Eye Short Story for his short stories "Sac-a-lait Man" and "The Heart Has Reasons" and a 2008 Derringer Winner for Best Novelette for Too Wise. His novel, John Raven Beau, was named Best Police Book of 2011 by police-writers.com.

De Noux was named the 2015 Literary Artist of the Year by the St. Tammany Parish Commission on Cultural Affairs, in Covington, Louisiana.

Two of de Noux's stories appeared in the Best American Mystery Stories Anthologies (2003 and 2013).
