= Tim Sullivan (writer) =

American novelist (1948–2024)

- Born: Timothy Robert Sullivan; June 9, 1948; Bangor, Maine, U.S.
- Died: November 10, 2024 (aged 76); Newport News, Virginia, U.S.
- Occupations: Novelist; short story writer; screenwriter; actor; film director
- Writing career
- Period: 1977–2014
- Genres: Science fiction, horror fiction, fantasy fiction, satire
- Subjects: Extraterrestrial life; astrophysics; the Future; Dinosaurs
- Literary movement: Savage Humanism

Timothy Robert Sullivan (June 9, 1948 – November 10, 2024) was an American science fiction novelist, screenwriter, actor, film director and short story writer.

Many of his stories have been critically acknowledged and reprinted. His 1981 short story "Zeke," a tragedy about an extraterrestrial stranded on Earth, has been translated into German and was a finalist for the 1982 Nebula Award for Best Short Story. "Under Glass" (2011), a well-reviewed semi-autobiographical short story with occult hints, has been translated into Chinese and is the basis for a screenplay by director/actor Ron Ford. "Yeshua's Dog" (2013) was also translated into Chinese.

== Early life ==
Tim Sullivan was born in Bangor, Maine, on June 9, 1948, the son of Charles Edward Sullivan, a United States Postal Service worker (born February 2, 1923), and Lillian Hope Fitzgerald Sullivan (b. March 31, 1924), a stay-at-home mother who raised their children, Charles Edward Sullivan Jr., and Timothy, the younger son. Sullivan later wrote short stories about his father, including "Hawk on a Flagpole" (2000) and "The Memory Cage" (2014).

Tim and Charlie developed a love of genre fiction from their father, who brought home for them books and comics ranging from Edgar Rice Burroughs to Vladimir Nabokov to Mad magazine. Tim shared these with his neighbors, who included Richard Tozier (who has become a jazz radio personality at Maine Public Broadcasting Network, and who is featured in three Stephen King novels, It, Dreamcatcher and 11/22/63). These show the strong ties among friendships born in Bangor, and Sullivan and Tozier retained a lifelong friendship. The Sullivan brothers attended John Bapst Memorial High School in Bangor, as did Tozier. Charlie (1946–1967), a corporal in the United States Marine Corps, died in battle in the Vietnam War.

When Sullivan's father died in 1968, Sullivan and his mother moved to Lake Worth, Florida. Tim Sullivan briefly attended Miami Dade Community College. Later, while studying English literature at Florida Atlantic University, he made a lifelong friendship with Professor Robert A. Collins. Sullivan earned a bachelor's degree while at FAU. Sullivan helped Dr. Collins create what has become the prestigious International Conference on the Fantastic in the Arts (ICFA; originally called Swanncon in honor of fantasy author and former FAU professor Thomas Burnett Swann). Sullivan began but did not complete postgraduate education.

Sullivan lived in Florida from 1968 to 1983, then in Philadelphia, and in the Washington, D.C. area. He moved to southern California in 1988, where he lived for the next twelve years.

== Career ==
Sullivan has written several novels and many more short stories. He has scripted, directed, and starred in microbudget films in the genres of science fiction and horror, often with his friend Ron Ford. Among his day jobs, Sullivan has worked in construction, in a bookstore, in a library, in a liquor store and other retail sites, as a night guard, as a taxicab driver, and with helping and teaching the mentally challenged.

=== Writing ===
Sullivan edited a horror anthology for Avon Books, Tropical Chills, in 1988. Sullivan also published his first novel, Destiny's End, in 1988. This science fiction novel was followed by The Parasite War in 1989, The Martian Viking in 1991, and Lords of Creation in 1992, and another horror anthology, Cold Shocks (Avon, 1991), among other books.

He befriended Michael Dirda, a chief book reviewer for The Washington Post and, as a result of that friendship, in the 1980s and 1990s Sullivan wrote commissioned reviews of dozens of books for The Washington Post, the Washington Post Book World, and USA Today. Among the fiction and nonfiction he reviewed are included: Kathleen Ann Goonan's The Bones of Time; a review of a novel by Walter Jon Williams, Metropolitan, which Sullivan characterized as highly readable "due largely to pungent characterization and persuasive dialogue"; and Allen Steele's novel The Tranquillity Alternative (1995), which he praised in the same issue of Book World.

He used different versions of his name while publishing fiction: Timothy Robert Sullivan, Timothy R. Sullivan, and Tim Sullivan.

=== Acting ===
Sullivan began his career in film in a collaboration with S. P. Somtow, entitled The Laughing Dead (1989); Sullivan plays a priest losing his faith, Father O'Sullivan, who becomes possessed by a Mayan god of death. Throughout the 1990s, he scripted, directed and acted in several low-budget science fiction and horror films, most notably Twilight of the Dogs (1995) and Hollywood Mortuary (1998), both of which have become cult favorites.

John Clute writes that Sullivan "concentrated for almost a decade on an acting career, though he began to publish short stories again in 2000."

== Personal life and death ==
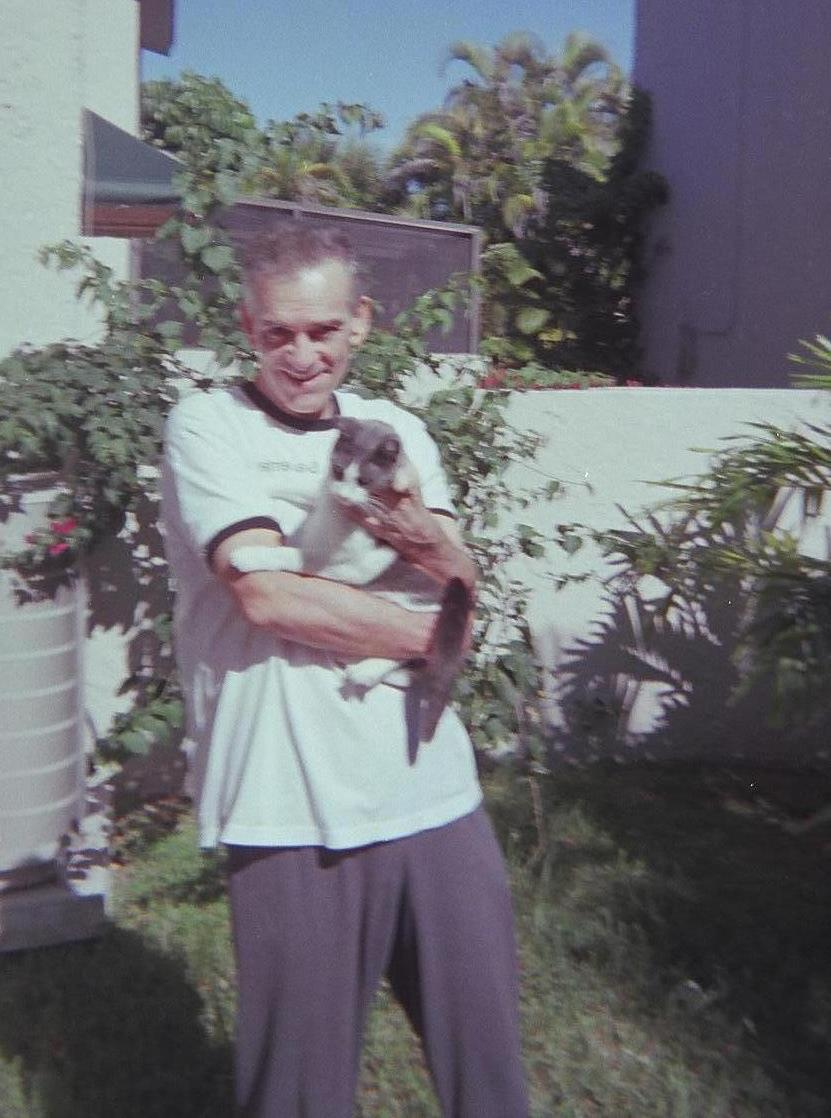
Tim Sullivan with his cat Mischka in his back yard in 2011.

After graduating from college, Sullivan lived for many years in Silver Lake, Los Angeles, Southern California. He never married and had no children. In 2000, Sullivan moved to South Florida to care for his ailing mother who died in 2004. In 2003, he moved to South Miami, Florida to share a house with Fiona Kelleghan. He left Florida in 2019 and settled in Newport News, Virginia.

Sullivan was an atheist. He was a constant reader; his bookshelf was filled with science fiction favorites, but also with the works of science popularizers, biographies, and histories. He maintained a Facebook page.

Sullivan died from congestive heart failure at a hospice in Newport News, on November 10, 2024, at the age of 76.

=== Literary friendships ===
Sullivan was roommates with fantasy authors S. P. Somtow in Alexandria, Virginia and Gregory Frost in Philadelphia. He became friends with several Clarion Workshop graduates, such as Kim Stanley Robinson. He was long-time friends with Gardner Dozois, Jack Dann, Pat Cadigan, John Kessel, James Patrick Kelly, John Grant, and Michael Swanwick.

He was part of a group of writers named the "Savage Humanists" by anthologist Fiona Kelleghan.

Sullivan has been tuckerized in the novels of many science fiction writers, including Sharon Webb.

== Bibliography ==
=== Novels ===
| Title | Year | ISBN of first edition | Main character | Notes |
|---|---|---|---|---|
| The Florida Project | 1985 | ISBN 0-523-42430-2 | | Number 5 of the V novels. In this novel, Sullivan tuckerized a number of his friends in the Washington Science Fiction Association (using their names as characters). |
| The New England Resistance | 1985 | ISBN 0-523-42467-1 | | Number 9 of the V novels. |
| To Conquer the Throne | 1987 | ISBN 0-8125-5727-1 | | Number 13 of the V novels. |
| Destiny's End | 1988 | ISBN 0-3807-5352-9 | Deles | An exile on the distant planet of Sripha must discover the secrets of his family and his past. A science fiction novel based on Greek mythology. On the first page of the novel, Sullivan tuckerized his friend Gardner Dozois in the phrase "the garden world of Doazwah." |
| The Parasite War | 1989 | ISBN 0-330-10597-3 | Alex Ward | A story of alien invasion. |
| The Dinosaur Trackers | 1991 | ISBN 0-06-106053-4 | | Co-written by Sullivan, Arthur Byron Cover, John Gregory Betancourt; cover art by Kevin Johnson. Number 4 in the series Robert Silverberg's Time Tours. |
| The Martian Viking | 1991 | ISBN 0-3807-5814-8 | Johnsmith Biberkopf | An adventure novel about Mars, Vikings, dreams, and hallucinations. |
| Lords of Creation | 1992 | ISBN 0-380-76284-6 | David Albee | A paleontologist faces struggles with dinosaurs, extraterrestrial aliens, and a televangelist. |

=== Short fiction ===
Anthologies edited

Tropical Chills (1988) (ISBN 0-3807-5500-9)

- 1. "Introduction" by Tim Sullivan
- 2. "Houston, 1943" by Gene Wolfe
- 3. "Mama Doah's Garden" by Susan Lilas Wiggs
- 4. "Grim Monkeys" by Steve Rasnic Tem
- 5. "The Flowers of the Forest" by Brian Aldiss
- 6. "White Socks" by Ian Watson
- 7. "Chrysalis" by Edward Bryant
- 8. "Night Fishing on the Caribbean Littoral of the Mutant Rain Forest" by Bruce Boston and Robert Frazier
- 9. "Dead Meat" by Charles Sheffield
- 10. "Where Do You Live, Queen Esther?" by Avram Davidson
- 11. "Talking Heads" by George Alec Effinger
- 12. "Getting Up" by Barry N. Malzberg and Jack Dann
- 13. "It Was the Heat" by Pat Cadigan
- 14. "A Part of Us" by Gregory Frost
- 15. "Zeke" by Timothy Robert Sullivan
- 16. "Graveyard Highway" by Dean Koontz

The Locus Index to Science Fiction: 1984–1998 described Tropical Chills as "Highly recommended."

It was republished in German as Heisse Angst (Droemer Knaur, 1990), translated by Marcel Bieger. (ISBN 3-426-01836-5)

Cold Shocks (1991) (ISBN 0-3807-5500-9)

- 1. "Introduction" by Tim Sullivan
- 2. "The Ice Children" by Gary Brandner
- 3. "First Kill" by Chet Williamson
- 4. "Colder Than by Hell" by Edward Bryant
- 5. "The Kikituk" by Michael Armstrong
- 6. "The Christmas Escape" by Dean Wesley Smith
- 7. "A Winter Memory" by Michael D. Toman
- 8. "The Sixth Man" by Graham Masterton
- 9. "The Ice Downstream" by Melanie Tem
- 10. "Morning Light" by Barry N. Malzberg
- 11. "Bring Me the Head of Timothy Leary" by Nancy Holder
- 12. "The Bus" by Gregory Frost
- 13. "Adleparmeun" by Steve Rasnic Tem
- 14. " Close to the Earth" by Gregory Nicoll
- 15. "Snowbanks" by Tim Sullivan
- 16. "St. Jackaclaws" by A. R. Morlan
- 17. "The Pavilion of Frozen Women" by S. P. Somtow

John Clute wrote that these two anthologies, "composed of carefully selected original and reprinted material, mostly horror, demonstrate Sullivan's editorial acuteness."

Stories

| Title | Year | First published | Reprinted/collected | Notes |
|---|---|---|---|---|
| Anomaly Station | 2014 | Sullivan, Tim (December 2014). "Anomaly Station". Asimov's Science Fiction. 38 (12): 68–106. | | Novella |

- "Doin' that Tachyon Rag" [a.k.a. "Tachyon Rag"] (Spring, 1977) – As by Timothy Robert Sullivan; first appeared in Unearth.
- "Downward to Darkness (Part 1 of 2)" (Fall/October, 1977) – As by Timothy Robert Sullivan; first appeared in Unearth; cover art by Tom Barber.
- "Downward to Darkness (Part 2 of 2)" (Winter/January, 1978) As by Timothy Robert Sullivan; first appeared in Unearth; cover art by Clyde Caldwell.
- "The Rauncher Goes to Tinker Town" (1979) - As by Timothy Robert Sullivan; first appeared in New Dimensions Science Fiction Number 9, edited by Robert Silverberg; ISBN 0-06-433336-1.
- "My Father's Head" (1979) – As by Timothy R. Sullivan. Published in Chrysalis 5, ed. Roy Torgeson, Zebra Books, ISBN 0-89083-518-7.
- "Zeke" (October, 1981) – First appeared in Rod Serling's Twilight Zone Magazine, ed. T. E. D. Klein.
  - Nominated for the 1982 Nebula Award for Best Short Story.
  - Translated as "Zeke" (in German) in Kopernikus 8 (November 1982).
  - Reprinted in Nebula Award Stories Seventeen (1983), ed. Joe Haldeman, ISBN 0-03-063528-4.
  - Reprinted in Nebula Award Stories 17 (1985), ed. Joe Haldeman, ISBN 0-441-56797-5.
  - Reprinted in The Savage Humanists (2008), ed. Fiona Kelleghan, ISBN 978-0-88995-425-0.
  - Reprinted in The Eighth Science Fiction Megapack: 25 Modern and Classic Stories, Wildside Press (2013)
- "The Army of the Woods" (February, 1982) - Fantasy Newsletter #45, ed. Robert A. Collins (Florida Atlantic University).
- "The Comedian" (June 1982) - First appeared in Isaac Asimov's Science Fiction Magazine.
  - Reprinted in: The 1983 Annual World's Best SF, ed. Donald A. Wollheim and Arthur W. Saha, DAW Books (DAW Collectors #528), ISBN 0-87997-822-8.
  - Reprinted in Time Travelers: From Isaac Asimov's Science Fiction Magazine (1989), ed. Gardner Dozois, ISBN 0-441-80935-9.
  - Nominated for the 1983 Locus Poll Award - Best Short Story.
- "A Major Game of Hoople" (1984) - Ares #17. A sports story, its title is a pun on Major Hoople.
- "JuJu, Incorporated" (May, 1984) - As by Timothy Robert Sullivan; Fantasy Review, ed. Robert A. Collins and Neil Barron (Florida Atlantic University).
- "Special Education" (January, 1986) - Isaac Asimov's Science Fiction Magazine.
- "Stop-Motion" (August, 1986) - Isaac Asimov's Science Fiction Magazine.
  - Placed #5 in the 1987 Asimov's Readers' Poll.
- "Dinosaur on a Bicycle" (March, 1987) - Isaac Asimov's Science Fiction Magazine.
  - Reprinted in: Dinosaurs! (June, 1990), ed. Jack Dann, Gardner Dozois, ISBN 0-441-14883-2.
- "Knucklebones" (1988) - Ripper!, ed. Gardner Dozois, Susan Casper, Tor Books, ISBN 0-812-51700-8.
  - Reprinted in: Jack the Ripper (1988), ed. Dozois and Casper, ISBN 0-7088-4062-0.
- "Father to the Man" (October, 1988) - Isaac Asimov's Science Fiction Magazine.
- "Midnight Glider" (Autumn, 1990) - Iniquities.
- "Nox Sanguinis" (Spring, 1991) - Pulphouse: The Hardback Magazine Issue 11, ed. Kristine Kathryn Rusch.
- "Fantasies" (August, 1991) - Co-written with Michael Swanwick, in Amazing Stories. A unicorn tale with a twist.
- "Snowbanks" (1991) - Cold Shocks, ISBN 0-380-76160-2.
- "Los Niños de la Noche" (1991) - The Ultimate Dracula, ed. Megan Miller, David Keller, Byron Preiss, Dell Publishing, ISBN 0-440-50353-1. Reprinted in: The Ultimate Dracula (2003), ed. Byron Preiss, ibooks Inc., ISBN 0-7434-5820-6.
- "Hypnoteyes" (December 31, 1991) - Pulphouse: A Fiction Magazine, ed. Dean Wesley Smith.
- "Anodyne" (November, 1992) - Pulphouse: A Fiction Magazine, ed. Dean Wesley Smith.
- "Atlas at Eight A.M." (Mid-December 1992) - Asimov's Science Fiction - a time loop story.
- "Mother and Child Reunion" (1993) - As by Timothy R. Sullivan; reprinted in The Ultimate Witch, ed. John Gregory Betancourt and Byron Preiss, Byron Preiss Visual Publications, ISBN 0-440-50531-3.
- "Hawk on a Flagpole" (July, 2000) - Asimov's Science Fiction.
- "The Mouth of Hell" (August, 2003) - Asimov's Science Fiction.
- "The Nocturnal Adventure of Dr. O and Mr. D" (April, 2008) - The Magazine of Fantasy & Science Fiction. A comedy about John Lennon and Philip K. Dick in the afterlife.
- "Planetesimal Dawn" (October–November, 2008) - The Magazine of Fantasy & Science Fiction.
- "Way Down East" (December, 2008) - Asimov's Science Fiction.
- "Inside Time" (December, 2009) - The Magazine of Fantasy & Science Fiction.
- "Star-Crossed" (March–April, 2010) - The Magazine of Fantasy & Science Fiction.
- "Under Glass" (November–December, 2011) - The Magazine of Fantasy & Science Fiction.
- "Repairmen" (March–April, 2012) - The Magazine of Fantasy & Science Fiction.
- "The Nambu Egg" (July–August, 2013) - The Magazine of Fantasy & Science Fiction. The title refers to the theories of Yoichiro Nambu.
- "Through Mud One Picks a Way" (November–December, 2013) - The Magazine of Fantasy & Science Fiction. Sullivan chose the title from a line in Robert Browning's poem "Red Cotton Night-Cap Country."
- "Gellen's Retirement Plan" (January 27, 2014) - Outpouring: Typhoon Yolanda Relief Anthology, ed. Dean Francis Alfar, an ebook from Kestrel & Flipside (i.e., Kestrel IMC Corporation and Flipside Digital Content Company, Inc.).
- "The Memory Cage" (May/June 2014) - The Magazine of Fantasy & Science Fiction.
- "Yeshua's Dog" (November–December, 2014) - The Magazine of Fantasy & Science Fiction. Sullivan gave a reading of this story at the 2013 Philcon science fiction convention.
- "Anomaly Station" (December, 2014) - The cover story for Asimov's Science Fiction, it was nominated for Best Novella in the 2015 Asimov's Readers' Poll.
- "Hob's Choice" (November–December 2015) - The Magazine of Fantasy & Science Fiction, a sequel to "The Nambu Egg" and "Through Mud One Picks a Way" (2013); SFRevu said, "A good story, but a little talky."

=== Screenplays ===
- Twilight of the Dogs (1995)
- Eyes of the Werewolf (1999)
- Vampyre Femmes (1999)
- V-World Matrix (1999)
- Hunting Season (2000)
- Demonicus (2001)

=== Non-fiction ===
- "Notables Gather (1980 ICFA)" (April, 1981) - As by Timothy Robert Sullivan; Locus, #243.
- "TZ is Year's Best Fantasy Film" (September, 1983) - As by Timothy Robert Sullivan; Fantasy Newsletter, #62. A film review of Twilight Zone: The Movie.
- "Holy Woody" (October–November, 1983) - As by Timothy Robert Sullivan; Fantasy Newsletter, #63. An essay about the film Zelig by Woody Allen.
- Review of Lyrec by Gregory Frost (March, 1984) - As by Timothy Robert Sullivan; SF & Fantasy Review, ed. Robert A. Collins and Neil Barron (Florida Atlantic University).
- "A Clockwork Worldcon" (October, 1984) - As by Timothy Robert Sullivan; Fantasy Review.
- "Guest Editorial: The New Network Fantasy Series: 'Slick But Stupid'" (October, 1985) - Fantasy Review.
- "Interview: Gardner Dozois" (November, 1985) - Fantasy Review.
- "Right Off the Wall" (June, 1986) - Fantasy Review.
- "Atlanta's Worldcon: The View from the Catbird Suite" (September, 1986) - Co-written with Gregory Frost; Fantasy Review, ed. Rob Latham and Robert A. Collins (Meckler Publishing Corporation).
- "Magazine Fiction in Review" (March, 1987) - Fantasy Review.
- "Magazine Fiction in Review" (May, 1987) - Fantasy Review.
- "Magazine Fiction in Review" (June, 1987) - Fantasy Review.
- "Extra! Extra! Read All About It! Science Fiction Writer Visits Alien World!" (July 27, 1991) - Pulphouse: A Weekly Fiction Magazine, ed. Dean Wesley Smith.

== Filmography ==
| Year | Title | Role | Notes |
|---|---|---|---|
| 1989 | The Laughing Dead | Father O'Sullivan | A horror film, featuring zombies and demons amid Aztec ruins, directed by S. P. Somtow. Gregory Frost, Edward Bryant and artist Raymond Ridenour have minor roles (Ridenour's character was named Dozois); Somtow's sister, Premika Eaton, also played a part. Award-winning fantasy author Tim Powers played a zombie. |
| 1994 | Ill Met by Moonlight | Oberon | Somtow directed this film as a modern adaptation of William Shakespeare's play A Midsummer Night's Dream. The cast included Timothy Bottoms as Egeus, Edward Bryant as Peter Quince, film-maker Ron Ford as Nick Bottom, Robert Z'Dar as Theseus, and Bill Warren in a minor part. Somtow directed Sullivan to deliver his lines in the voice of Nick Nolte; Sullivan is noted for vocal impressions. |
| 1994 | Fast Forward: Contemporary Science Fiction | Himself | Documentary television episode. |
| 1995 | Twilight of the Dogs | Sam Asgarde | A science fiction film written by Sullivan and directed by John R. Ellis. Originally entitled New Genesis: Twilight of the Dogs. The title is a pun on Götterdämmerung, meaning Twilight of the Gods. |
| 1996 | Alien Force | Army Slacker Fred / Jaywalker / Gorek Foo | This science fiction film directed by Ron Ford for Wildcat Entertainment features Burt Ward as an alien overlord and Randal Malone as Raleigh. |
| 1997 | The Mark of Dracula | | Count Dracula menaces a small rural town in this Ron Ford film, which includes archive footage of Max Schreck as Count Orlok in Nosferatu. |
| 1997 | Alien Agenda: Under the Skin | | |
| 1998 | Dead Time Tales | Phil Canyon | The movie, in four segments, is based on the short stories "The Mark of the Beast" by Rudyard Kipling, "The Transformation" by Mary Shelley, "The Crystal Egg" by H.G. Wells, and a fourth story by David S. Sterling (producer of Camp Blood). |
| 1998 | Hollywood Mortuary | Pratt Borokov | In this horror-comedy, Randal Malone plays makeup artist Pierce Jackson Dawn, a name conflating those of Jack Pierce and Jack Dawn; Sullivan plays Pratt Borokov, a thinly veiled Boris Karloff, while Ron Ford performs the part of Janos Blasko (Bela Lugosi). Margaret O'Brien, Anita Page, Conrad Brooks and David DeCoteau play themselves. |
| 1998 | Creaturealm: From the Dead | Pratt Borokov | |
| 1999 | V-World Matrix | Dr. Parks | |
| 1999 | Vampyre Femmes | Nacho | Written and directed by Sullivan for Dead Alive Productions. |
| 1999 | Eyes of the Werewolf | Dr. Atwill | Written and directed by Sullivan for SNJ Productions. |
| 1999 | A Passion to Kill | | |
| 2000 | Hunting Season | | |
| 2000 | Camp Blood | George | A direct-to-video slasher film written and directed by Brad Sykes. |
| 2000 | Camp Blood 2 | Dr. West | A sequel to Camp Blood directed by Brad Sykes and produced by David S. Sterling. |
| 2001 | Deadly Scavengers | The Doctor | A deadpan joke is that the Doctor was hired because his job is "to clean things up." This is an allusion to the character role of Newman as "The Cleaner" in the Seinfeld episode The Muffin Tops, which in turn was an allusion to Harvey Keitel's role as "The Wolf" in 1994's Pulp Fiction. |
| 2005 | The Naked Monster | Dr. Howard | Science fiction/horror comedy written by Ted Newsom and directed by Newsom and Wayne Berwick as an homage to and spoof of the "giant monster-on-the-loose" films of the 1950s. |

== Critical response ==
John Clute writes that Sullivan "began publishing sf with stories like "Tachyon Rag" ... "My Father's Head" ... and "The Rauncher Goes to Tinker Town" ... tales whose sophistication led to some disappointment when his first-published novels turned out to be three ties to the V Television series, a series of exercises in easy Paranoia set in an America taken over by Aliens... The published order of Sullivan's books was, however, deceptive, as his first-written novel, Destiny's End (1988), had suffered delays and modifications at the hands of the publisher to which it had first been contracted. The book proved to be a complexly moody depiction of humanity at the end of its tether in an array of Dying-Earth venues, as Secret Masters from the stars with quasimagical Technologies manipulate the course of events. Other sf of interest included The Parasite War (1989), which garishly intensifies the premises of V with a few scattered humans engaged in guerrilla warfare against the Aliens who have nearly destroyed the planet; The Martian Viking (1991), in which a prisoner escapes from Mars and roams space and time with stern but rowdy Vikings; and Lords of Creation (1992), which combines palaeontological fantasy including dinosaur eggs and another alien Invasion."

Science fiction scholar Fiona Kelleghan has written that Sullivan "often turn[s] to classical history and mythology to dramatize his concerns about contemporary American culture - although the historical settings suggest a Santayana-esque view of our so-called post-historical era. ... Sullivan cares deeply about his characters. His books are viciously funny in a deadpan way..."

The Locus Index to Science Fiction: 1984–1998 described Destiny's End as a "transcendental, philosophical space opera."

Christine Hawkins, in her online Mars in Science Fiction Bibliography, described The Martian Viking as "reminiscent of Philip K. Dick". The reviewer of the Schlock Value review website said, in a mostly positive review of the same novel:

It's a well-established fact that the two coolest things ever are Vikings and Mars, and now, thanks to Tim Sullivan, we get both of them in one convenient package. How could this book be anything but great? Unfortunately, The Martian Viking deals a lot less with Vikings than we were promised, although Mars does feature quite prominently, and as far as crapsack future societies go, the book does present us with a pretty interesting one... The world we are presented with is a fairly interesting form of dystopia... All-in-all, The Martian Viking was a pretty fun read... Tim Sullivan managed to set up a really interesting future world.

Raymond's Reviews said of The Martian Viking, "it had some moments of warped originality that were hard to forget."

Robert Silverberg, who purchased Sullivan's early story "The Rauncher Goes to Tinker Town" for his New Dimensions series of science fiction anthologies, called it "vivid and energetic".

A reviewer for the Dark Roasted Blend website wrote of Sullivan's short story "Stop-Motion": "Animation, dinosaurs, special effects, a little bit of murder mystery - not bad a combination, solid story in the pulp tradition."

Sullivan's short story "Under Glass" has received much attention. Lois Tilton wrote, "This is a story of friendship and the duty we owe to our friends." Reviewer Sandra Scholes said in a review of the November/December 2011 The Magazine of Fantasy & Science Fiction that the issue "gets straight to it with a tasty novelette, "Under Glass" by Tim Sullivan; who sees everything with a writer's vision of the future we have never known yet or at least until it is too late." Sam Tomaino, another reviewer of the same issue of F&SF, urgently wrote, "The fiction in the issue starts with "Under Glass" by Tim Sullivan... This was an imaginative, moving, wonderful novelette and one that will be on my Hugo short list for next year."

Sullivan's 2013 story "The Nambu Egg" received praise from the SF CrowsNest website: "'The Nambu Egg' by Tim Sullivan is definitely Science Fiction. It is set in the distant future when the Tachtrans Authority can beam people to a distant planet, Cet Four in this case. Adam Naraya has returned to Earth because he has a Nambu egg to sell to the head of a rich corporation, one Mr. Genzler. To tell more of the plot would be to ruin it for it's the kind of tale where things are slowly revealed. Rest assured that the length of this paragraph does not reflect the very high esteem I have for the story."

Colleen Chen, writing a review for Tangent magazine of "Through Mud One Picks a Way", said,

"Sullivan revisits a space and time he's written about before — a future in which main characters hail from Cet 4, a heavy-gravity planet tough to live on but with abundant natural resources. In this story, taking place on Earth, Uxanna Venz has been hired by a fellow named Hob to communicate with three Cetians whom he has illegally obtained and wants to use for his own benefit. The Cetians are amorphous, clammy creatures whose home is the bogs of Cet 4, and they communicate with Uxanna by touching her with squidlike tentacles they can form at will. Uxanna earns their trust at the same time as she feels guilty for doing so. They've been so abused on their home planet by humans encroaching on their territory, and she knows Hob can't have good intentions for them. There's more twists to the story, though, as Uxanna learns the truth about their appearance on Earth, and then unveils her own surprises as she tries to do what's best for the Cetians at the same time as earning her money. I've read one other story by Sullivan that takes place in this universe. I liked this one more — although maybe it's just that the author's particular style, which seems to develop both plot and characters mainly through dialogue, is growing on me. But this story has enough action to keep the story moving despite the lengthy dialogues, and thus it translates into a visual piece that I felt I could watch like a movie in my own head. The characters were likable, the world-building strong, and although the ending is left somewhat unresolved, it stops at a point which promises later continuation."

Eamonn Murphy, writing for the SF Crowsnest, agreed:

"Through Mud One Picks A Way" by Tim Sullivan ... is genuine Science Fiction about three aliens from Cet Four who have been transported to Earth by a businessman for purposes unknown. He has hired Uxanna Venz to communicate with them by touch telepathy, which they do well. She worked on their home planet and is an expert on the species. A nice parable about colonialism with a couple of decent twists to keep you surprised. It was mostly written in dialogue with very little narration, but Sullivan managed to get all the background information across anyway. A neat trick."
