= 1979 in science fiction =

The year 1979 was marked, in science fiction, by the following:

== Events ==
- The first issue of Chinese science fiction magazine Science Fiction World is published
- The 37th annual Worldcon, Seacon '79, is held in Brighton, UK

== Births and deaths ==
=== Deaths ===
- Ed Earl Repp

== Literary releases ==
=== Novels ===
- The Hitchhiker's Guide to the Galaxy, by Douglas Adams
- Kindred, by Octavia E. Butler
- Shikasta, by Doris Lessing

=== Comics ===
- First issue of Starblazer published

=== Other books ===
- Barlowe's Guide to Extraterrestrials, by Wayne Barlowe

== Movies ==
- Alien
- The Black Hole
- The Humanoid
- Mad Max
- Moonraker
- Stalker
- Star Trek: The Motion Picture

== Television ==
- Mobile Suit Gundam

== Video games ==
- Asteroids

== Awards ==
=== Hugos ===
- Best novel: Dreamsnake, by Vonda N. McIntyre
- Best novella: The Persistence of Vision, by John Varley
- Best novelette: "Hunter's Moon", by Poul Anderson
- Best short story: "Cassandra", by C. J. Cherryh
- Best dramatic presentation: Superman, Directed by Richard Donner; screenplay by Mario Puzo and David Newman and Leslie Newman & Robert Benton; story by Mario Puzo; based on characters created by Jerry Siegel & Joe Shuster
- Best professional editor: Ben Bova
- Best professional artist: Vincent Di Fate
- Best fanzine: Science Fiction Review, ed. by Richard E. Geis
- Best fan writer: Bob Shaw
- Best fan artist: William Rotsler

=== Nebulas ===
- Best novel: The Fountains of Paradise, by Arthur C. Clarke
- Best novella: Enemy Mine, by Barry Longyear
- Best novelette: "Sandkings" by George R. R. Martin
- Best short story: "giANTS" by Edward Bryant

=== Other awards ===
- BSFA Award for Best Novel: The Unlimited Dream Company, by J. G. Ballard
- Saturn Award for Best Science Fiction Film: Alien
