= Ben Draper =

Ben Draper may refer to:

- Ben Draper (actor) in CB the Red Caboose
- Ben Draper, character in Zombie Chronicles
