= Patrick Thomas (actor) =

American actor

- Occupation: Actor
- Years active: 1990–present

Patrick Thomas is an American actor. Thomas has had roles in several TV shows and movies. He has also done voice acting.

== Filmography ==
=== Film ===
Year	Title	Role	Notes
1985	School Spirit	Party Animal	Uncredited
1986	The Malibu Bikini Shop	Hyper Life Guard	Uncredited
1987	Death Wish 4: The Crackdown	Roller Rink Punk	Uncredited
1988	Screwball Hotel	Preppie	
1989	The Weirdo	Dean	
1989	Surgikill	Orderly Arnold	
1990	Fatal Charm	Eddie	
1991	My Worst Enemy	Killer	
1992	Invasion of Privacy	Pawnbroker	
1992	Eddie Presley	Ron the Ventriloquist / Budgie	
1993	Under Investigation	Keys	
1995	Perfect Alibi	Coroner	
1997	Mouse Hunt	Construction Worker #1	
1997	American Hero	Mister Fleekins	
1998	Curse of the Puppet Master	Shipping Manager	
1998	Ted	Brain Surgeon	
1998	The Boy Who Saved Christmas	Brontos	
1998	Addams Family Reunion	Uncle Fester Addams / Gordon Craven	Replacing Christopher Lloyd
2000	The Egg Plant Lady	Franklin	
2000	The Prophet's Game	Lewis Shanks	
2000	Camp Blood 2	Patrick	
2000	Dead 7	Buchinsky	
2001	Knight Club	Goofy Looking Guy	
2003	Going Down	Officer Bungle	
2004	Killer Story	George	
2004	Slammed	Champ	
2005	Jacqueline Hyde	Telemarketer	
2007	Pretty Cool Too	Metal Detector Guy	
2007	SpaceDisco One	The Director	
2007	Dead Letters	Slim	

=== Television ===
Year	Title	Role	Notes
1968	Family Affair	Eddie	Episode: "The New Casey"
1984	Antony and Cleopatra	Extra	Television film
1984	Murder, She Wrote	Dewey Johnson	Episode: "Death Takes a Curtain Call"
1986	Capitol	Fred	Episode #1.1125
1994	Shattered Image	Guy	Television film
1995	Murphy Brown	Lenny	Episode: "Murphy's Law"
1996	Widow's Kiss	Burnette / Sergeant	Television film
1996	3rd Rock from the Sun	Customer #1	Episode: "Frozen Dick"
1997	Skeletons	Toby Carlyle	Television film
1997	Big Bad Beetleborgs	Crimson Creep / Carter Howard	2 episodes
1998	Addams Family Reunion	Uncle Fester	Television film
1999	Power Rangers Lost Galaxy	Red Shark	Episode: "Shark Attack"
2000	Celebrity Deathmatch	Charlton Heston	Episode: "Suddenly Diamond"
2001	Area 52	Spud	Television film
2002	Power Rangers Wild Force	Juggelo	Episode: "Team Carnival"
