= Psychological thriller =

Genre combining thriller and psychological fiction

Psychological thriller is a genre combining the thriller and psychological fiction genres. It is commonly used to describe literature or films that deal with psychological narratives in a thriller or thrilling setting.

In terms of context and convention, it is a subgenre of the broader ranging thriller narrative structure, with similarities to Gothic and detective fiction in the sense of sometimes having a "dissolving sense of reality". It is often told through the viewpoint of psychologically stressed characters, revealing their distorted mental perceptions and focusing on the complex and often tortured relationships between obsessive and pathological characters. Psychological thrillers often incorporate elements of mystery, drama, action, and paranoia. The genre overlaps with the psychological drama and psychological horror genres, the latter generally involving more horror and terror elements and themes and more disturbing or frightening scenarios.

== Definition ==
Peter Hutchings, a screenwriter and director, states the following about psychological thrillers: "narratives with domesticated settings in which action is suppressed and where thrills are provided instead via investigations of the psychologies of the principal characters." A distinguishing characteristic of a psychological thriller is its emphasis on the mental states of its characters: their perceptions, thoughts, distortions, and general struggle to grasp reality.

According to director John Madden, psychological thrillers focus on story, character development, choice, and moral conflict; fear and anxiety drive the psychological tension in unpredictable ways. However, the majority of psychological thrillers have happy endings. Madden stated their lack of spectacle and strong emphasis on character led to their decline in Hollywood popularity. Psychological thrillers are suspenseful by exploiting uncertainty over characters' motives, honesty, and how they see the world. Films can also cause discomfort in audiences by privileging them with information they wish to share with the characters; guilty characters may suffer similar distress by virtue of their knowledge.

However, James N. Frey defines psychological thrillers as a style, rather than a subgenre; Frey states good thrillers focus on the psychology of their antagonists and build suspense slowly through ambiguity. Creators and/or film distributors or publishers who seek to distance themselves from the negative connotations of horror often categorize their work as a psychological thriller. The same situation can occur when critics label a work to be a psychological thriller in order to elevate its perceived literary value.

== Literary devices and techniques ==
- Plot twist – Films such as Psycho and The Skeleton Key have advertised the fact that they contain plot twists and asked audiences to refrain from revealing spoilers. Psychological thrillers with poorly received plot twists, such as The Village, have suffered in the box office.
- Unreliable narrator – Andrew Taylor identifies the unreliable narrator as a common literary device used in psychological thrillers and traces it back to Edgar Allan Poe's influence on the genre. Criminal insanity may be explored as a theme.
- MacGuffin – Alfred Hitchcock pioneered the concept of the MacGuffin, a goal or item that initiates or otherwise advances the plot. The MacGuffin is frequently only vaguely defined, and it can be used to increase suspense.
- Red herring – The term was popularized by William Cobbett and is defined as a kind of fallacy that is an irrelevant topic introduced to divert the attention of the audience. A red herring is used to lead the audience to make false assumptions and mislead its attention.

== Themes ==
Many psychological thrillers have emerged over the past years, all in various media (film, literature, radio, etc.). Despite these very different forms of representation, general trends have appeared throughout the narratives. Some of these consistent themes include:

- Death
- Existence/Purpose
- Identity
- Mind
- Perception
- Reality

In psychological thrillers, characters often have to battle an inner struggle. Amnesia is a common plot device used to explore these questions. Character may be threatened with death, be forced to deal with the deaths of others, or fake their own deaths. Psychological thrillers can be complex, and reviewers may recommend a second or third viewing to "decipher its secrets". Common elements may include stock characters, such as a hardboiled detective and serial killer, involved in a cat and mouse game. Sensation novels, examples of early psychological thrillers, were considered to be socially irresponsible due to their themes of sex and violence. These novels, among others, were inspired by the exploits of real-life detective Jack Whicher. Water, especially floods, is frequently used to represent the unconscious mind, such as in What Lies Beneath and In Dreams.

Psychological thrillers may not always be concerned with plausibility. Peter Hutchings defines the giallo, an Italian subgenre of psychological thrillers, as violent murder mysteries that focus on style and spectacle over rationality. According to Peter B. Flint of The New York Times, detractors of Alfred Hitchcock accused him of "relying on slick tricks, illogical story lines and wild coincidences".

== Examples ==
=== Screenwriters and directors ===
- Brad Anderson – Ethan Anderton of firstshowing.net describes Anderson's psychological thrillers as "unique" and covering the theme of memory loss.
- Dario Argento – Italian director known for his cult films in giallo, horror, and psychological thrillers. He is often referred to as "the Italian Hitchcock".
- Darren Aronofsky – Frequently covers themes of madness, pursuit of perfection, and psychology.
- Park Chan-wook – Korean director who explored the genre in his "vengeance trilogy" (Sympathy for Mr. Vengeance, Oldboy, and Lady Vengeance), Stoker, and The Handmaiden
- David Cronenberg – Philip French states that Cronenberg is a "prime exponent" of a subgenre of psychological thrillers, body horror: "stories of terror involving parasites, metamorphoses, diseases, decomposition and physical wounds".
- Brian De Palma – Called a cineaste by Vincent Canby, de Palma is known for his psychological thrillers and horror films influenced by Alfred Hitchcock.
- Alfred Hitchcock – Hitchcock often applied Freudian concepts to his thrillers, as in Jamaica Inn, Rebecca, Spellbound, Rear Window, Vertigo, Psycho and Marnie.
- Satoshi Kon – Japanese anime director known for making psychological thrillers, such as Perfect Blue and Paprika.
- David Lynch – His surreal films have inspired the descriptor "Lynchian", which Jeff Jensen of Entertainment Weekly defines as "bizarrely banal, or just plain trippy."
- Christopher Nolan – British-American director whose films deal with the mind, memory, and the line between fantasy and reality.
- Roman Polanski – Described as a "world class director" by Sheila Johnston of The Independent, she states that his reputation was established by his "superb early psychological thrillers".
- Martin Scorsese – American director known for psychological thrillers such as Taxi Driver, Cape Fear and Shutter Island.
- M. Night Shyamalan – Indian-American director known for making psychological thrillers that often have a twist ending in them.
- David Fincher – American director known for his mainstream thriller films with psychological elements including Se7en and Gone Girl.
- Paul Verhoeven – Dutch director known for psychological thrillers that explore obsession, sexuality, and power, often blending provocation with social satire, as seen in Basic Instinct, The Fourth Man (1983 film) and Elle (film).

=== Film ===
- Alice, Sweet Alice
- American Psycho
- Basic Instinct
- Birdeater
- Black Mirror: Bandersnatch
- Black Swan
- The Brave One
- Burning
- Cape Fear
- Cat's Eye
- Chronicle
- Climax
- Coherence
- The Conversation
- Cure
- Dead Ringers
- Donnie Darko
- Don't Worry Darling
- Elle (film)
- Enemy
- Eraserhead
- Fatal Attraction
- Fight Club
- The Fourth Man (1983 film)
- Funny Games
- The Game
- Gerald's Game
- Get Out
- The Gift
- Gone Girl
- Goth
- The Handmaiden
- Hard Candy
- Hereditary
- Hider in the House
- The Hitcher
- Horse Girl
- I'm Thinking of Ending Things
- Inception
- Insomnia
- The Jacket
- Jacob's Ladder
- The Lighthouse
- The Machinist
- Martha Marcy May Marlene
- Memento
- Misery
- Mulholland Drive
- Nightcrawler
- Nocturnal Animals
- Obsession
- Oldboy
- Only God Forgives
- Paprika
- Parasite
- Perfect Blue
- Persona
- Pi
- Psycho
- Rashomon
- Rear Window
- Repulsion
- Requiem for a Dream
- The Screaming Skull
- Se7en
- The Shining
- The Silence of the Lambs
- Sisters
- The Sixth Sense
- Shutter Island
- Signs
- Soft and Quiet
- Spider
- Stay
- Stoker
- The Invitation
- The Substance
- Taxi Driver
- The Thing
- The Woman in the Window
- Tom at the Farm
- Us
- Vanilla Sky
- Vertigo

=== Television ===
- Damages
- Dexter
- Dollhouse
- Exile
- The Following
- Halifax: Retribution
- Hannibal
- Homeland
- Jessica Jones
- Mad Dogs
- Mr. Robot
- You

=== Literature ===
- Humayun Ahmed – Known for a series of Bengali psychological thrillers based on a professor of psychology named Misir Ali, which The Daily Star called unique in Bengali literature.
- Nicci French – The pseudonym of husband-and-wife team Nicci Gerrard and Sean French, authors of eleven best-selling psychological thrillers.
- Patricia Highsmith – Reuters described her psychological thrillers as "intricately plotted" which existed in a "claustrophobic and irrational world".
- Henry James – Known for The Turn of the Screw and other horror stories.
- Jonathan Kellerman – The Baltimore Sun described Kellerman's Alex Delaware novels as "taut psychological thriller[s]".
- Stephen King – John Levesque of the Seattle Post-Intelligencer called Stephen King a "master of the psychological thriller".
- Minette Walters – The Sun-Sentinel stated that Walters has gained a cult following for her "dark, well-constructed psychological thrillers."
- Freida McFadden – The New York Times published an article on "how Freida McFadden Conquered the Thriller Genre." She is one of the most popular and bestselling authors of psychological thrillers with more than 7 million copies sold across ebook, paperback and audio.

=== Anime and manga ===
- Death Note
- Ergo Proxy
- Future Diary
- Terror in Resonance
- Tomodachi Game
- Classroom of the Elite
- Kakegurui
- Serial Experiments Lain
- Monster
- Blood on the Tracks
- Homunculus
- Neon Genesis Evangelion
- Paranoia Agent
- Psycho-Pass
- Puella Magi Madoka Magica
- Texhnolyze
- Wonder Egg Priority
- BanG Dream! Ave Mujica

=== Video games ===
- Alan Wake – Combines psychological thriller with shooter gameplay.
- Heavy Rain – Time called Heavy Rain a combination of Choose Your Own Adventure and psychological thriller in which players hunt down a serial killer.
- Hotline Miami – An independent top-down game with psychological aspects of crime-thriller genre influenced by several films.
- Silent Hill series as a whole.
- Soma (video game) – Combines the themes of philosophical, thought provoking ideas whilst being centred in a psychological thriller genre.
