= Gregory Frost =

American novelist

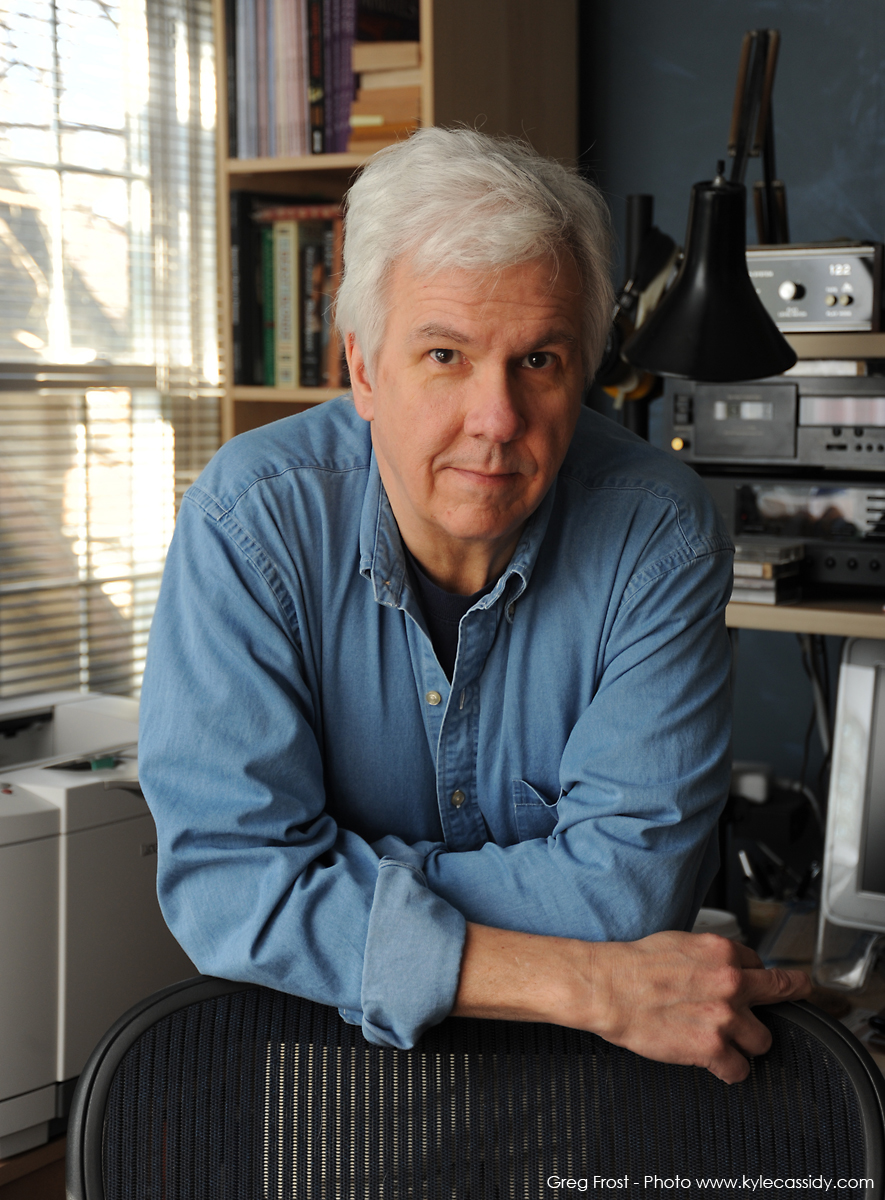
- Gregory Frost in 2008, (photograph by Kyle Cassidy)
- Born: May 13, 1951 (age 75)
- Occupations: Novelist; short story writer; essayist
- Writing career
- Genre: Fantasy
- Notable work: Fitcher's Brides
- Movement: Savage Humanism

Gregory Frost (born May 13, 1951) is an American author of fantasy, horror, and science fiction. He taught the fiction writing workshop at Swarthmore College from 2004 to 2022. He received his bachelor's degree from the University of Iowa. A graduate of the Clarion Workshop, he has been invited back as instructor several times, including the first session following its move to the University of California, San Diego in 2007. He is also active in the Interstitial Arts Foundation.

Author Orson Scott Card called Frost's novel Tain "a marvelous straightforward retelling of an ancient national myth."

He has also done research for non-fiction television (The Learning Channel, Discovery Channel) and acted in a couple of independent horror movies. His initial vocation was as an artist.

Gregory Frost is a founding partner of The Liars Club, a networking group of professionals in publishing and other aspects of entertainment that includes Jonathan Maberry, Jon McGoran, Kelly Simmons, Dennis Tafoya, Merry Jones, Keith R.A. DeCandido, Don Lafferty, Marie Lamba, Keith Strunk, and Edward Pettit.

Frost lives and works in Pennsylvania, USA.

== Bibliography ==
=== Novels ===
- Frost, Gregory (1984). Lyrec.
- Tain (1986) ISBN 9780441795345
- Remscéla (1988) ISBN 9780441713509
- The Pure Cold Light (1993) ISBN 9781611382365
- Fitcher's Brides (2002) ISBN 9780765301956

Shadowbridge

1. Shadowbridge (2008) ISBN 9780345497581
2. Lord Tophet: A Shadowbridge Novel (2008) ISBN 9780345497598

Rhymer Trilogy

1. Rhymer (2023) ISBN 978-1982192662
2. Rhymer: Hoode (2024) ISBN 978-1982193492
3. Rhymer: Hel (2025) ISBN 978-1668072608
- The Secret House (2025) ISBN 978-1685101480

=== Short fiction ===
Collections

- Crimson Spear: The Blood of Cu Chulainn (1998) — a reprint of Tain and Remscéla in one volume. ISBN 9780446589437
- Attack of the Jazz Giants and Other Stories (2005) — collected short fiction. ISBN 9781930846340
- Beyond Here Be Monsters (2024) ISBN 9781958880265

Stories (Note: Short stories unless otherwise noted.)

| Title | Year | First published | Reprinted/collected | Notes |
|---|---|---|---|---|
| No others are genuine | 2013 | Frost, Gregory (Oct–Nov 2013). "No others are genuine". Asimov's Science Fiction. 37 (10–11): 110–125. | | Novelette |
| Lock up your chickens and daughters—H'ard and Andy are come to town! | 2015 | Swanwick, Michael & Gregory Frost (April–May 2015). "Lock up your chickens and daughters—H'ard and Andy are come to town!". Asimov's Science Fiction. 39 (4–5): 54–69. | | Novelette |

- "In the Sunken Museum" The Twilight Zone Magazine, May 1981.
  reprinted in Night Cry, Vol. 1, No. 3, Fall 1985. Reprinted in translation in Italy.
- "A Day in the Life of Justin Argento Morrel" The Magazine of Fantasy & Science Fiction, July 1983.
  reprinted, in Norwegian, as "En dag i Justin Argento Morrels" in Terra Nova Nr. 2–1988, edited by Lynda C. Bentsen (translator), and published in Oslo, Norway.
- "Rubbish" The Magazine of Fantasy & Science Fiction, February 1984.
- "The Yazata" Whispers, Volume 6, Number 21-22, December 1984.
- "Crowley and the Leprechaun" in Faery!, edited by Terri Windling; Ace Fantasy Books/Berkley Publishing Group, January 1985.
- "In Media Vita" Isaac Asimov's Science Fiction Magazine, January 1985.
- "Sardofa’s Horseshoes" in Magic In Ithkar 2, edited by Andre Norton & Robert Adams; Tor Books, December 1985.
- "Reduction" written with John Kessel, Isaac Asimov's Science Fiction Magazine, January 1986.
- "Show of Faith" in Liavek: The Players of Luck, Will Shetterly & Emma Bull, editors; Ace Fantasy Books/Berkley Publishing Group, June 1986.
- "The Hound of Mac Datho", a selection from Tain, Isaac Asimov's Science Fiction Magazine, November 1986.
  (Portion of the novel Remscéla.)
- "The Vow that Binds" in Invitation to Camelot, Parke Godwin, editor; Ace Books, March 1988.
- "From Hell Again" in Ripper!, Gardner Dozois & Susan Casper, editors; Tor Books, September 1988.
  reprinted in the premiere issue of the internet e-zine, Dark Annie.
- "An Act of Love" written in collaboration with Steven Brust and Megan Lindholm, in Liavek IV: Spells of Binding, Will Shetterly & Emma Bull, editors; Ace Books, November 1988.
- "A Part of Us" Tropical Chills, edited by Tim Sullivan; Avon Books, November 1988.
- "Lizaveta" Isaac Asimov's Science Fiction Magazine, Mid–December 1988.
  reprinted in Best New Horror, edited by Stephen Jones & Ramsey Campbell, Robinson (U.K.) October, 1990; Carroll & Graf (U.S.) Spring, 1991.
- "Divertimento" Isaac Asimov's Science Fiction Magazine, December 1989.
  reprinted in Best New Horror 2, ed. Stephen Jones & Ramsey Campbell, Robinson (U.K.) October, 1991; Carroll & Graf (U.S.).
- "The Incompleat Ripper" written with Jack Dann; Starshore, vol. 1 no. 1, Summer 1990.
  (reprinted in The Fiction Factory, edited by Jack Dann, Golden Gryphon Press, 2005)
- "The Activists" Unique, September–October 1990.
- "The Bus" in Cold Shocks, edited by Tim Sullivan, August 1991; Avon Books.
- "Attack of the Jazz Giants" Bruce McAllister & Harry Harrison, eds., There Won't Be War, Tor Books, November 1991.
- "The Hole in Edgar’s Hillside" Isaac Asimov's Science Fiction Magazine, Mid-December 1991.
  reprinted in Unicorns II, Gardner Dozois & Jack Dann, eds. Ace Books, November 1992.
- "Some Things Are Better Left" Asimov's Science Fiction, February 1993.
- "The Root of the Matter" Snow White, Blood Red, Ellen Datlow & Terri Windling, editors; William Morrow & Co., Inc and Avon Nova, January 1993.
- "Touring Jesusworld" written for Damon Knight, guest editor, Pulphouse, Issue 18, 1995.
- "That Blissful Height" in Intersections, edited by John Kessel, Mark L. Van Name, and Richard Butner, Tor Books, January 1996.
  reprinted in The Mammoth Book of Best New Horror, edited by Stephen Jones, Carroll & Graf, October 1997.
- "Sparks" in Black Swan, White Raven, edited by Ellen Datlow & Terri Windling, Tor Books, May 1997
- "How Meersh the Bedeviler Lost His Toes", Asimov's Science Fiction, September 1998.
  Finalist for the Theodore Sturgeon Memorial Award for short fiction, 1999
- "Collecting Dust," White of the Moon, edited by Stephen Jones. Pumpkin Books, May, 1999.
- "Tales Within," Electric Wine (www.electricwine.com-deceased) July–September 2000.
- "The Girlfriends of Dorian Gray," Dark Terrors 5, edited by Stephen Jones & David Sutton, Carroll & Graf UK, November 2000.
- "Madonna of the Maquiladora," Asimov's Science Fiction, May, 2002.
  Finalist for both the Nebula Award and the James Tiptree Jr. Award
- "The Prowl," Mojo: Conjure Stories, edited by Nalo Hopkinson, Warner Books, April, 2003.
- "The Harp That Sang," My Swan Sister and other retold fairy tales, edited by Ellen Datlow & Terri Windling, Simon & Schuster, late 2003.
- "Tengu Mountain," The Faery Reel, edited by Ellen Datlow & Terri Windling, Viking Juvenile, August 3, 2004.
- "Dub," Weird Trails, edited by Darrell Schweitzer, Wildside Press, November 2004.
- "So Coldly Sweet, So Deadly Fair," Weird Tales magazine, April 2006. Reprinted in Liar, Liar the Liars Club anthology, 2011.
- "Ill-Met in Ilium," The Secret History of Vampires, edited by Darrell Schweitzer, DAW Books, 2007.
- "Lucyna's Gaze," Clockwork Phoenix 3, edited by Mike Allen, Norilana Books, 2010.
- "The Bank Job," Full Moon City, edited by Darrell Schweitzer, Gallery Books (Simon & Schuster), 2010.
- "The Comeuppance of Creegus Maxin", The Beastly Bride, edited by Ellen Datlow & Terri Windling, Viking, 2010.
- "The Dingus," Supernatural Noir, edited by Ellen Datlow, Dark Horse Books, 2011.
- "No Others Are Genuine," "Asimov's Science Fiction," October/November 2013, nominated for the Bram Stoker Award.

=== Non-fiction ===
- Beginning in 1985, numerous book reviews, appearing in Fantasy Review, The Philadelphia Inquirer, and The Washington Post.
- "Amongst the Laughing Dead" (Fear, No. 8, August 1989 (Great Britain)
  (an article about the making of, and participation in, S. P. Somtow's horror film The Laughing Dead)
- "Twice Encountered" in Dancing With the Dark, edited by Stephen Jones (Vista Books (U.K.) June 1997)
  (a collection of true ghost stories related by horror and fantasy writers)
- "Celtic Influence on Contemporary Fantasy Fiction," (Brigit’s Feast, Spring 1999).
- "The Tale of the Puzzle of the Tales," (Realms of Fantasy, August, 2001; reprinted on the Endicott Studio of Mythic Arts site)
  (a history of The Arabian Nights)
- "The Fantasy Life of Salons," (Realms of Fantasy, Nov/December 2001; reprinted on the Endicott Studio of Mythic Arts site)
  (an article on Mesmerism in the French salons of the 18th century)
- "Reading the Slipstream," The Cambridge Companion to Fantasy Literature, edited by Edward James & Farah Mendlesohn, Cambridge University Press, 2012.

———————

== Television ==
- Principal researcher for "Curse of the Pharaohs" episode of Science Frontiers, on the Discovery Global Network (US: The Learning Channel), originally broadcast in March, 1999.
- Principal researcher and preliminary script writer for "Wolfman: The Science & the Myth" episode of Science Frontiers, on the Discovery Global Network (US: The Learning Channel), originally broadcast in the US on October 31, 1997. This episode won awards at various national non-fiction television competitions.

== Film ==
Frost had roles in two microbudget horror films, as "Frost" (essentially himself) in S. P. Somtow's 1989 The Laughing Dead and as "Butcher Deacon #2" in John R. Ellis's Twilight of the Dogs (1995), both starring his friend and fellow writer Tim Sullivan.
