= The Tranquillity Alternative =

1996 novel by Allen Steele

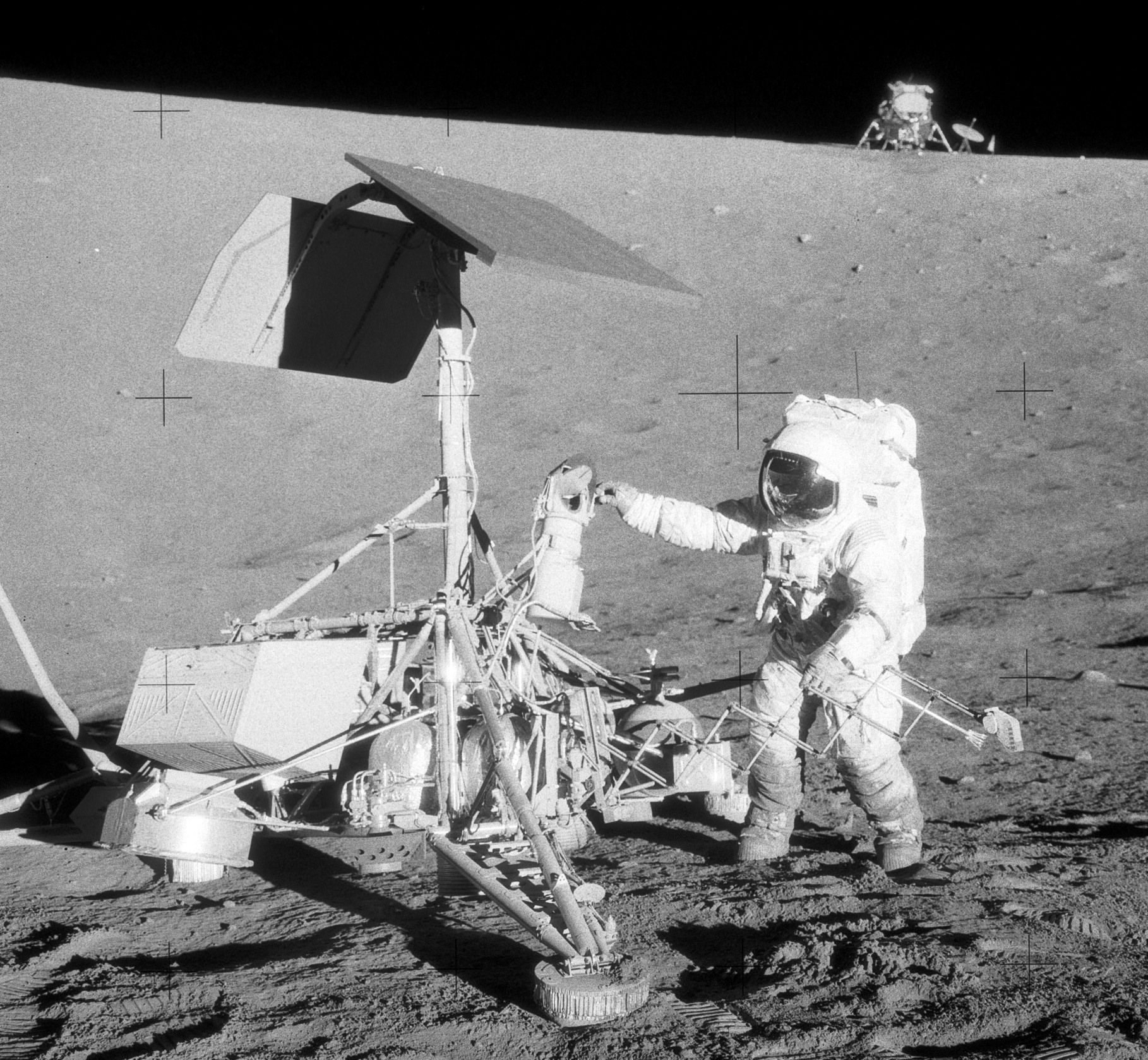
- Apollo 12
- Author: Allen Steele
- Cover artist: Bob Eggleton
- Language: English
- Genre: Science fiction
- Publisher: Ace Books
- Publication date: 1996
- Publication place: United States
- Pages: 320 pag.
- ISBN: 0-441-00433-4
- OCLC: 857715616
- Preceded by: The Jericho Iteration
- Followed by: A King of Infinite Space

The Tranquillity Alternative is a science fiction and space drama novel written by Allen Steele published by Ace Books in 1996. The author's sixth novel, it tells an alternate history in which the United States placed nuclear missiles on the Moon in 1960. The country then loses interest in the Space Race and decides to send astronauts to destroy the missiles. That is when North Korea decides to steal the missiles.

== Context ==
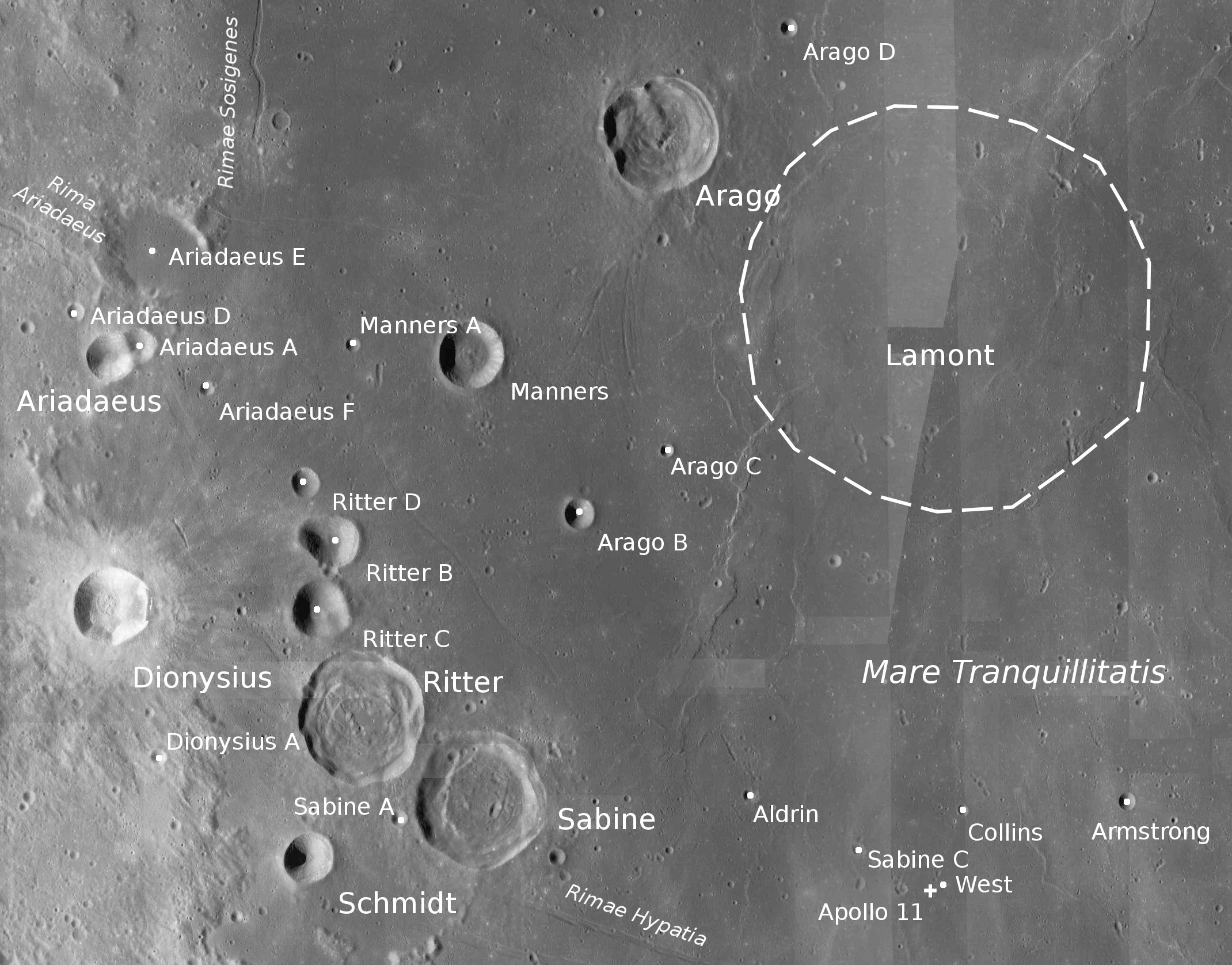
Mare Tranquillitatis on the Moon Map.

The original idea for this work is already seen in the author's early writings, as seen in his short novel Operation Blue Horizon, published in Worcester Monthly magazine in September 1988. The published text did not completely satisfy the author and he republished it as Goddard's People (1991) in Asimov's Science Fiction magazine. This, together with the short story "John Harper Wilson" (1989), inspired by Willy Ley's novel The Conquest of Space, its film adaptation and Chesley Bonestell's astronomical art, were the source material for the writing of the novel.

Steele wanted to write a novel that would merge near-future science fiction with a mystery thriller set in space, one that did not resemble techno-thrillers like Payne Harrison's Storming Intrepid or Dale Brown's Silver Tower. Unlike the baby boomers who grew up with Tom Corbett, Space Cadet and the movie Destination Moon, the author's cultural references were Cornelius Ryan's Across the Space Frontier (1952), as well as Star Trek and 2001: A Space Odyssey.

== Composition ==
National Aeronautics and Space Administration (NASA) logo.

The book consists of 22 untitled chapters and an epilogue and an afterword, interspersed with material that gives a broader view of the world being described; such as the transcript of President Harry S. Truman's radio address to the nation reporting the successful interception of the Amerikabomber.

Questioned about the double l in the name of the novel, the author commented: "That's the way it is on the map. That was one of the things that Ace's copy writers queried me about. It's a weird damn thing, but tranquility in the dictionary is spelled with one 'L' but if you go and take a look at the lunar map, it has two 'L's. This is something we had to go back and take a look at. I guess whoever made the original maps of the Moon mis-spelled it and the spelling stuck."

== Plot ==
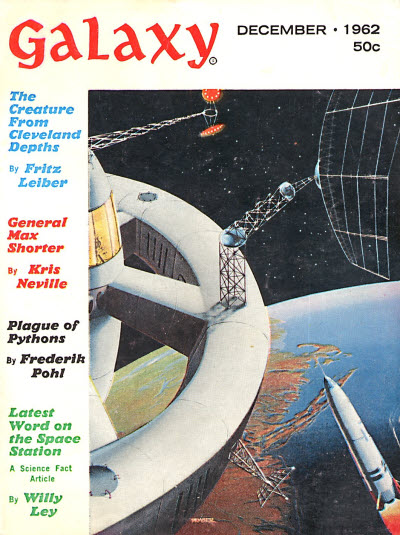
The Conquest of Space by Willy Ley inspired the author to write stories set in near space.

The Tranquillity Alternative is a uchronia set in 1995, where space travel developed earlier as a result of hypersonic bomber technology. At the height of the Cold War, the United States placed six missiles with nuclear warheads as the ultimate deterrent to a Soviet stealth attack. The idea was that if the Soviets attempted to deliver a knockout blow to U.S. ground assets, the lunar missiles would still be there to strike back.

Due to lack of funding and public interest, NASA is forced to sell the lunar outpost, Tranquility Base, to a German conglomerate. But before the Germans can take possession to turn it into a toxic waste dump, the United States has one last mission: to destroy the nuclear missiles placed there two decades ago, to ensure that they never fall into enemy hands and to show that the United States has given up on the Militarisation of space. The latest mission to Tranquility Base is to dismantle the missiles.

== Characters ==
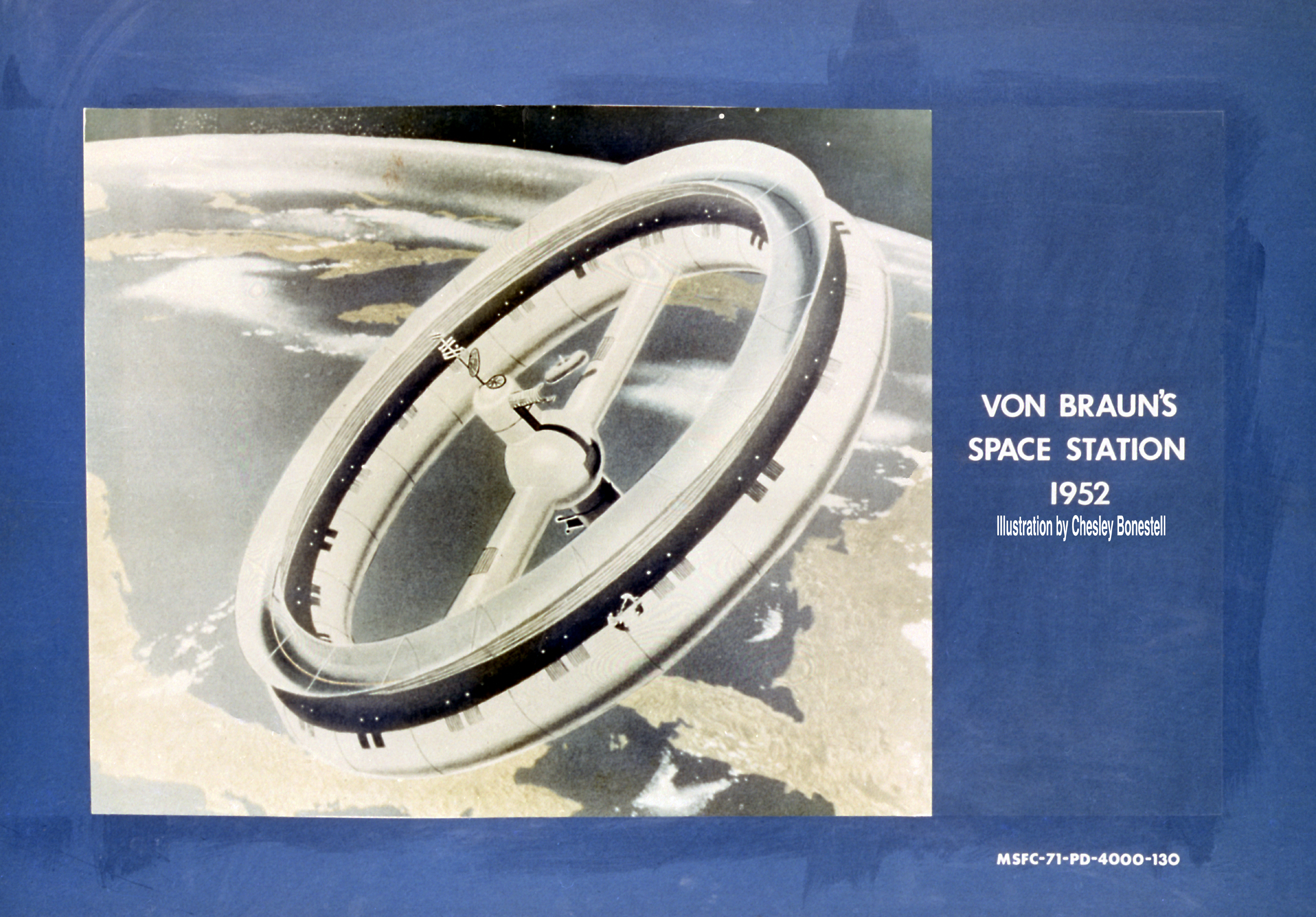
Astronomical art by Chesley Bonestell, source of inspiration for the author.

- Paul Dooley: computer genius. Fan of pizza with pepperoni, olives and extra cheese.
- Mike Momphrey: called Mister Mom, bodyguard assigned to Paul Dooley.
- Gene Parnell: pilot. Old white man given to nostalgia. Leads the last US mission to the Moon. Met his wife in 1961 after graduating from Annapolis. Although he jogged two or three miles every morning he had a pot belly. His buzz cut was graying and the short beard he had grown was as white as beach sand.
- Judith Parnell: wife of Gene Parell. She studied at Wellesley. Her hair was completely gray. She was 34 years old and married to Gene.
- Helen Parnell: daughter of Gene and Judith.
- Gene Jr. Parnell: son of Gene and Judith. Spike's boyfriend. Constant source of concern for his parents. Expelled from two private schools and dropped out of college. Arrested for selling marijuana. Finally settles in Los Angeles after hitchhiking across the country. Managed a retro boutique shop.
- Spike: lead singer of a Los Angeles band called The Doggy Position. He had interesting tattoos and was interested in quitting his job to open a sex shop in Hollywood.
- Joe Clark: launch room technician. Former member of the Moon Project.
- Keit Baldini: launch room technician. Former member of the Moon Project.
- Cristine Ryer: astronaut. Mission co-pilot. Resentful lesbian. Despised by her colleagues.
- Jay Lewitt: flight engineer for the Conestoga.
- Lisa: wife of Jay Lewitt.

== Time ==
Strategic Defense Initiative Logo.

The novel takes place in a single week and is set first at Patrick Space Force Base, where the crew that will later depart for the Moon to dismantle the nuclear missiles stationed there must assemble.

=== Historical time ===
The novel explores what might have happened to the U.S. space program had it taken shape in the context of World War II. The narrated story takes place in a 1995 where the space race developed early and several milestones in space exploration were achieved, which in our reality have not been achieved. In this alternate reality Michael Jackson is a civil rights activist and lives in free union with Brooke Shields; who is nominated for an Academy Award for Best Actress. In Bill Clinton's presidency, he meets with Charles III of the United Kingdom; who has already been crowned king, to discuss a free trade agreement between the two nations.

== Reviews ==
Paul Di Filippo reviewing the book for Science Fiction Age magazine commented, "Steele seems to be moving deliberately and cautiously into Tom Clancy territory." He also emphasizes how his writing recycles his own content, "The first chapter...recalls the first chapter of Clarke County, Space. From Lunar Descent, we get the trope of the old gunslinger called back into service...And the lunatic space tug pilot we knew as Virgin Bruce in Orbital Decay here is called Dr. Z." To finally note: "This is his best-written book yet on a structural and sentence-by-sentence level. Once prone to sounding like a younger brother joker, Steele here is quiet and elegiac, and even reaches for real poetry."

Tim Sullivan in his review for The Washington Post writes, "The Tranquillity Alternative, is hard science fiction at its finest." And he comments, "sets us up for an excellent climax on the moon, with plenty of action, unpredictable plot twists and a believable alternate history from the half-century post-World War II to the present, all perfectly connected with the motivations and actions of well-drawn characters."

The Magazine of Fantasy & Science Fiction states, "The Tranquillity Alternative is a great space thriller. Steele has a lot of fun tinkering with the events of our lives, from the cultural aspects of film, television, and music to politics and the advances of space exploration. Best of all, you don't have to be a geek to enjoy it." Lucas Gregor for Absolute Magnitude praises Steele saying, "He has shown growth with each new book he has written. The Tranquility Alternative is no exception. One can only wonder how far Steele will take hard science fiction." And he comments, "What follows is a tense, suspenseful, action-packed story of intrigue and international politics. If you are not yet familiar with Steele's work, now is the perfect time to do so."

Kirkus Reviews review: "Impressive in the hardware department, albeit with disappointingly stereotyped characters," ... "can't disguise the paucity of plot ... or that Steele's true purpose is more propaganda than entertainment." For its part Publishers Weekly highlights, "Several promising subplots, dealing with a lesbian love interest and computer mores, are not fully exploited, and Steele's world-building, which was never solid, is especially weak here, with many of the social and sociological developments ill-conceived."

== Legacy ==
In 1994 Steele published V-S Day: A Novel of Alternate History, a novella that functions as a prequel to The Tranquillity Alternative. This story was nominated for the 2015 Sidewise Award for Alternate History in the Best Long Story category.

== See also ==
- Rocket Ship Galileo
- The Silent Sea (TV series)
- The Moon Is a Harsh Mistress
- Space warfare
- Militarisation of space
- Space warfare in science fiction

== Bibliography ==
- Di Filippo, Paul (March 1996). "The Tranquillity Alternative". Science Fiction Age. 4 (3). Sovereign Media Co. ISSN 1065-1829.
- Gregor, Lucas (1996). Lapine, Warren (ed.). "The Tranquillity Alternative". Absolute Magnitude. 1 (5). Radford, Virginia: DNA Publications. ISSN 1070-6569.
- Jenkins, Henry (1998). "Allen Steele (1958- )". media in transition. Massachusetts Institute of Technology.
- Kelly, Mark R. "Sidewise Awards 2015". science fiction awards database. The Locus Science Fiction Foundation.
- Rambraut, Dag (July 9, 2015). "Allen Steele Interview". SFFWorld.
- Rusch, Kristine (1996). "Brief Reviews: Books". The Magazine of Fantasy & Science Fiction. 90 (6): 32. ISSN 0024-984X.
- Steele, Allen (1996). The Tranquillity Alternative. New York: Ace Books. ISBN 0-441-00433-4.
- Sullivan, Tim (May 26, 1996). "Destination: Moon". The Washington Post. Washington D. C.: Nash Holdings.
