= Steve Rasnic Tem =

American author (born 1950)

- Rasnic Tem at World Fantasy Convention 2026
- Born: 1950 (age 75–76); Jonesville, Virginia, U.S.
- Education: Virginia Tech; Virginia Commonwealth University (BA); Colorado State University
- Occupation: Author
- Spouse: Melanie Tem
- Children: 4
- Writing career
- Genre: Horror fiction
- Notable awards: British Fantasy Award; World Fantasy Award; Bram Stoker Award

Steve Rasnic Tem (born 1950) is an American author. He was born in Jonesville, Virginia.

== Life and career ==
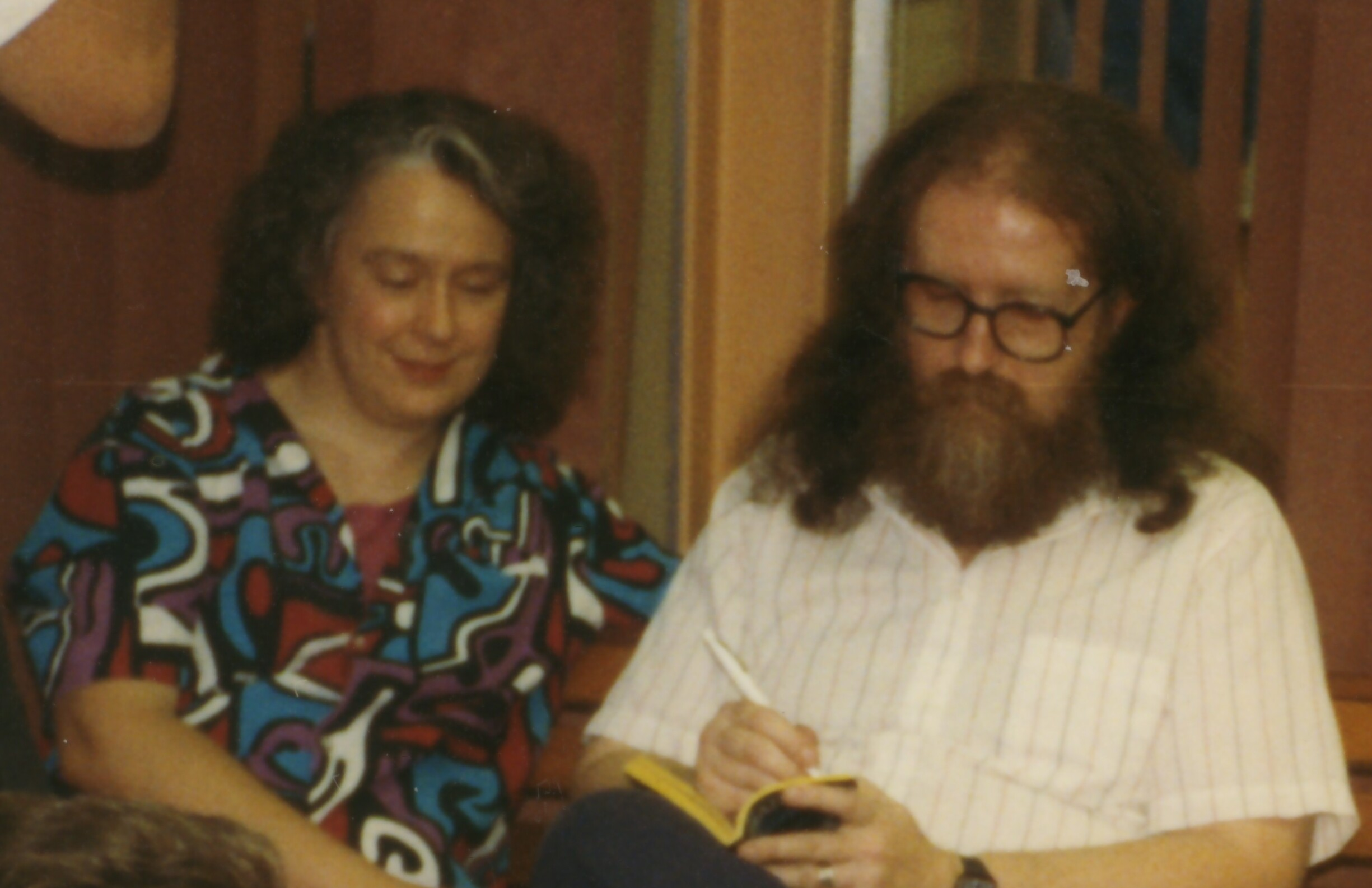
Tem and his wife Melanie in 1992

Rasnic attended college at Virginia Tech, and also at Virginia Commonwealth University. He earned a B.A. in English education. In 1974, he moved to Colorado and studied creative writing at Colorado State University. He married Melanie Kubachko, and the couple took the joint surname "Tem". They had four children and lived in Colorado.

Rasnic Tem's short fiction has been compared to the work of Franz Kafka, Dino Buzzati, Ray Bradbury, and Raymond Carver, but to quote Joe R. Lansdale: "Steve Rasnic Tem is a school of writing unto himself." His 500 plus published pieces have garnered him a British Fantasy Award, a World Fantasy Award and four Bram Stoker Awards. In 2023, he won the Bram Stoker Lifetime Achievement Award.

== Bibliography ==
=== Novels ===
- Excavation (1986)
- Daughters (2001) (with Melanie Tem)
- The Book of Days (2002)
- The Man on the Ceiling (2008) (with Melanie Tem)
- Among the Living (2011)
- Deadfall Hotel (2012)
- Blood Kin (2014)
- In the Lovecraft Museum (2015)
- Ubo (2017, Solaris) – ISBN 1781085110
- The Mask Shop of Doctor Blaack (2018)

=== Short fiction ===
==== Collections ====
- Decoded Mirrors: Three Tales After Lovecraft (1978)
- Fairytales (1985)
- Absences: Charlie Goode's Ghosts (1991)
- City Fishing (2000)
- Imagination Box (2001) (with Melanie Tem)
- The Far Side of the Lake (2001)
- The Hydrocephalic Ward (2003)
- In Concert (2010) (with Melanie Tem)
- Ugly Behavior (2012)
- Twember (2013)
- Onion Songs (2013)
- Celestial Inventories (2013)
- Here with the Shadows (2014)
- Out of the Dark. A Storybook of Horrors (2017)
- A Primer to Steve Rasnic Tem (2017)
- Figures Unseen: Selected Stories (2018)
- Everything Is Fine Now (2018)
- The Harvest Child and Other Fantasies (2018)
- The Night Doctor and Other Tales (2019)
- Thanatrauma (2021)
- Everyday Horrors (2024)
- Queneau's Alphabet. A Story Cycle (2025)
- The World Under (2026)

==== Stories ====
(Uncollected)

- Kiss (1981)
- Night Cry (1981)
- The Owl wth Human Eyes (1981)
- White Rose (1981)
- Early Warning (1981)
- Interlude in a Laboratory (1981)
- Again, the Hit-and-Miss (1981)
- A Fairytale (1982)
- Housewarming (1982)
- The Reincarnation (1982)
- On a Path of Marigolds (1982)
- Shadows on the Grass (1983)
- The Moths (1983)
- First Rights (1983)
- The Day it Rained Vaginas (1984)
- The End of the Yarn (1984)
- Spidertalk (1984)
- Piano Moon (1985)
- Katherine's Shadow (1986)
- Self-Possessed (1986)
- The Three Billy Goats Gruff (1986)
- In Control (1986)
- Presents of Mind (1986) (with Edward Bryant, Dan Simmons & Connie Willis)
- Wake (1987)
- L is for Love (1987)
- Her New Parents (1988)
- The Lie (1988)
- The Double (1988)
- Motherson (1989)
- The Deep Blue Sea (1989)
- The Strangers (1989)
- Black (1989)
- Bodies and Heads (1989)
- Back Windows (1990)
- My Wife, with the Yellow Hair (1990)
- Playing Dead (1990)
- The Adoptions (1990)
- The Regulars (1991)
- Plainclothes (1991)
- Going North (1992)
- The Process (1992)
- Blue Alice (1992)
- Devourings (1993)
- Passing Through (1993)
- The Child Killer (1993)
- The Garden, in Autumn (1994)
- Release of Flesh (1994)
- Sampled (1995)
- Shades (1995) (with Roma Felible)
- After the Night (1995)
- Blood Knot (1995)
- Close to You (1996)
- Elena (1996)
- Sharp Edges (1997)
- Andrew (1997)
- What Slips Away (1998)
- Each Day (1998)
- The Cough (1998)
- Heat (1999)
- Creeps (2000)
- This Thing Called Love (2002)
- Denegare Spasticus (2003)
- Espectare Necrosis (2003)
- Excerpt: First Entry in The Book of Days (2003)
- Yesterday (2004)
- Spirited (2005)
- Mysteries of the Colon (2005)
- The House by the Bulvarnoye Koltso (2007)
- Burning Snow (2008)
- Noppero-Bo (2008)
- Shadow (2009)
- The Stench (2009)
- Last Drink Bird Head (2009)
- Red Light (2009)
- Shaggy Dog Story (2010)
- Old Men on Porches (2010)
- The Passing (2010)
- S.D. Watkins, Painter of Portraits (2010)
- Living Arrangement (2010)
- Cattiwampus (2011)
- El Lagarto (2011)
- The Ex (2011)
- Pillows (2011)
- To Denver (With Hiram Battling Zombies (2012)
- Scree (2012)
- Waiting at the Crossroads Motel (2012)
- The Old Man Beset by Demons (2012)
- Jack and Jill (2012)
- Miranda Jo's Girl (2012)
- Congregate (2012)
- The Sleeping Ute (2013)
- The Monster Makers (2013)
- Home Invasion (2013)
- Lookie-Loo (2013)
- Crawldaddies (2014)
- The Grave House (2015)
- In the Lovecraft Museum (2015)
- Deep Fracture (2015)
- The Common Sea (2017)
- I Saw Santa (2017)
- Love Letters (2018)
- A Space of One's Own (2018)
- Eidetic (2019)
- Night Vision (2019)
- Captain Zack & the Data Raiders (2019)
- Miguel Prays While His Mother Cries (2019)
- Bigger Than Life (2019)
- Z is for Zombie (2020)
- Conversations with the Departed (2020)
- E is For Eye (2020)
- Mummies (2021)
- Do You Remember? (2022)
- The Year of the Robot Suicides (2022)
- Eye of the Storm (2022)
- The Man in the Mirror (2022)
- N Is for Night (2022)
- The Sire (2022)
- Y Is for Yesterday (2022)
- Subsidence (2023)
- W Is for Whispers (2023)
- H Is for the Hunt (2023)
- F Is for the Farm (2023)
- P Is for Phantasies (2023)
- Higher Powers (2023)
- Tutti i Morti (2023)
- A Is for Alphabet (2023)
- Sundown in Duffield (2023)
- The Return (2024)
- Imago (2024)
- He Has Always Lived in This House Alone (2024)
- The Stroll (2024)
- Carcinogenesis (2024)
- Jolly (2024)
- Before and After (2024)
- Prime Purpose (2025)

=== Anthologies ===
- The Umbral Anthology of Science Fiction Poetry (1982)
- High Fantastic: Colorado's Fantasy, Dark Fantasy and Science Fiction (1987)

=== Poetry ===
(Uncollected)

- My Daughter (1978)
- The Other State (1978)
- The Hydrocephalic Ward (1979)
- Lighting the Colony (1980)
- Alternate Worlds Ghazal (1980)
- The Landed Gentry (1980)
- The New Weather (1980)
- Dragon Lore (1980)
- Seeding the Last Freedom (1980)
- Changes (1981)
- On Defining & Not Defining Speculative Poetry (1981)
- The Swimmer (1982)
- Dinosaurs (1982)
- ESP (1982)
- Three Cinquains (1982)
- Time Paradox Cinquain (1982)
- Dirt Under His Nails (1982)
- Syrup (1982)
- Doubles (1983)
- Faery (1983)
- The Lovers (1983)
- After the Collapse (1983)
- First Contact (1983)
- The Dreaming Machine Dreams it Becomes Human (1984)
- The Dreaming Machine Eats an Apple (1984)
- The Dreaming Machine Has a Nightmare (1984)
- Ghost Signs (1987)
- Ancient Astronomies (1988)
- No Man Is (1988)
- Looking Back at Apollo (1989)
- Nocturne (1989)
- The Adolescence of NGC 4535 (1992)
- Head (1992)
- Belly (1993)
- Cells (1993)
- Ulcer (1995)
- Dark at the Door (1995)
- Shreve House (1995)
- The Dead Who Do Not Sleep Under Green Street (1995)
- Digits (1997)
- Genital (1997)
- Heart (1997)
- Limbs (1997)
- Lung (1997)
- Muscle (1997)
- The Little Match Girl (1997)
- Creatures Without Names (2002)
- What Must Not Happen (2004)
- What Happens at Night (2004)
- This is the Last Time I'm Telling the Truth (2004)
- The Window (2004)
- The Colors of Dark (2004)
- All Used Up (2004)
- Hair (2004)
- The Troll on 23rd Ave (2006)
- The Great Man's Apology (2007)
- How to Play Dead (2010)
- Pumpkin Eater (2010)
- 39 (2011)
- After We're Gone (2013)
- In Quietude (2016)
- Wraith (2017)
- The Night Arrives (2019)
- Leaving Home (2020)

== Awards ==
Work	Year & Award	Category	Result	Ref.
The Umbral Anthology of Science Fiction Poetry	1982 Philip K. Dick Award		Nominated	
Firestorm	1983 World Fantasy Award	Short Fiction	Nominated	
Excavation	1987 Bram Stoker Award	First Novel	Nominated	
Leaks	1988 British Fantasy Award	Short Story	Won	
Bodies and Heads	1989 Bram Stoker Award	Short Fiction	Nominated	
Back Windows	1990 Bram Stoker Award	Short Fiction	Nominated	
Head	1992 Asimov's Readers' Poll	Poem	10th Place	
High Fantastic	1996 World Fantasy Award	Anthology	Nominated	
Halloween Street	1999 International Horror Guild Award	Short Fiction	Nominated	
Halloween Street	1999 Bram Stoker Award	Short Fiction	Nominated	
City Fishing	2000 Bram Stoker Award	Fiction Collection	Nominated	
City Fishing	2000 International Horror Guild Award	Collection	Won	
The Man on the Ceiling (with Melanie Tem)	2000 Bram Stoker Award	Long Fiction	Won	
The Man on the Ceiling (with Melanie Tem)	2000 International Horror Guild Award	Long Story	Won	
The Man on the Ceiling (with Melanie Tem)	2001 World Fantasy Award	Novella	Won	
The Man on the Ceiling (with Melanie Tem)	2009 Shirley Jackson Award	Novel	Nominated	
In These Final Days of Sales	2001 Bram Stoker Award	Long Fiction	Won	
Imagination Box (with Melanie Tem)	2002 International Horror Guild Award	Collection	Nominated	
The Book of Days	2003 International Horror Guild Award	Novel	Nominated	
The Breavement Photographer	2003 International Horror Guild Award	Short Fiction	Nominated	
Invisible	2005 Bram Stoker Award	Short Fiction	Nominated	
Invisible	2005 International Horror Guild Award	Short Fiction	Nominated	
The Disease Artist	2006 International Horror Guild Award	Short Fiction	Nominated	
In Concert (with Melanie Tem)	2008 Asimov's Readers' Poll	Novelette	3rd Place	
A Letter from the Emperor	2011 Locus Award	Short Story	Nominated	
A Letter from the Emperor	2011 Theodore Sturgeon Award	Short Science Fiction	Finalist	
Blood Kin	2014 Bram Stoker Award	Novel	Won	
In the Lovecraft Museum	2016 Shirley Jackson Award	Novella	Nominated	
Ubo	2017 Bram Stoker Award	Novel	Nominated	
Ubo	2018 Locus Award	Horror Novel	Nominated	
	2023 Bram Stoker Award	Lifetime Achievement	Won	

== See also ==
- List of horror fiction authors
