= Zombie Chronicles =

2001 film directed by Brad Sykes

- DVD cover
- Directed by: Brad Sykes
- Written by: Garrett Clancy
- Produced by: Jeff Ferguson; David S. Sterling
- Starring: Emmy Smith; Joe Haggerty; Garrett Clancy; Janet Tracy Keijser; Beverly Lynne
- Cinematography: Jeff Leroy
- Edited by: John Polonia; Mark Polonia
- Distributed by: Brain Damage Films; Razor Digital Entertainment
- Release date: 2001
- Running time: 71 minutes
- Country: United States
- Language: English

Zombie Chronicles, also known as The Zombie Chronicles and Zombie Chronicles: 3D, is a 2001 horror film directed by Brad Sykes. It follows Tara Woodley, a reporter who visits an old desert town to research her article on the ghost town legends from around there. On the way she picks up the hitchhiker, Ebenezer Jackson, who takes her to an abandoned building where she interviews him via tape recorder.

== Premise ==
Zombies rise and attack the living. Tara interviews a hitchhiker in an abandoned building. He tells her a story. Ebenezer then proceeds to tell her another story.

== Cast ==
- Emmy Smith as Tara Woodley
- Joe Haggerty as Ebenezer Jackson
- Garret Clancy as Sergeant Ben Draper
- Greg Brown as Private Wilson
- Mike Coen as Jason
- John Kyle Grady as "Buzz"
- Janet Tracy Keijser as Melinda
- Beverly Lynne as Marsh
- Jarrod Robbins as Geeter

== Home media ==
Zombie Chronicles was released on DVD. One DVD release includes the film in both regular 2D and in stereoscopic 3D.
