= Goth (2003 film) =

- Directed by: Brad Sykes
- Written by: Brad Sykes
- Produced by: David S. Sterling
- Starring: Phoebe Dollar; Laura Reilly; Dave Stann; Larry Sprock; Todd Livingston; Jed Rowen; Ashley White; Keishi Nagatsuka
- Cinematography: Jay Truesdale
- Edited by: Julie Lucas
- Music by: Will Hudson
- Release date: 10 June 2003
- Country: United States
- Language: English

Goth is a 2003 American horror film directed by Brad Sykes. The film stars Phoebe Dollar, Laura Reilly, Dave Stann, Larry Sprock and Todd Livingston in the lead roles, and contains music by Will Hudson.
