= Dead Letters (film) =

Dead Letters; Cold Ones
- Poster bearing the film's original title Cold Ones
- Directed by: Garrett Clancy
- Written by: Garrett Clancy
- Produced by: Garrett Clancy; Josephina Sykes; Patricia Anne Isgate
- Starring: C. Thomas Howell; Duane Whitaker; Adam Nelson; Geoffrey Lewis; Kim Darby; Joe Unger
- Cinematography: Scott Spears
- Edited by: Richard Casey; David H. Lloyd
- Music by: David Baerwald
- Production company: Brightway Productions Inc.
- Distributed by: Leo Films
- Release date: 2007
- Running time: 90 minutes
- Country: United States
- Language: English

Dead Letters is a 2007 independent feature film written and directed by Garrett Clancy, executive produced by Paul Hellweg, produced by Josephina Sykes, and co-produced by Brad Sykes. It stars C. Thomas Howell, Geoffrey Lewis, Kim Darby, Joe Unger and Duane Whitaker. It was originally entitled Cold Ones, and was retitled by Distributor, Leo Films, for its 2009 DVD release. It won Honorable Mention in the feature film category at the 2007 Buffalo Niagara Film Festival. The film's score was composed by David Baerwald who also has several songs on the soundtrack, including "Hi Ho" with vocals by Terra Naomi. Dead Letters (as Cold Ones) also played at the 2007 Real to Reel Film Festival in North Carolina, and both The California Independent and the Kern Projections Film Festivals. This film was retitled as Lake of the Woods in 2021 and released by All-Channel Films.
