= GiANTS =

Short story by Edward Bryant

"giANTS" is a 1979 science fiction short story by Edward Bryant. It was first published in Analog Science Fiction.

== Synopsis ==
An elderly scientist explains why he hates ants, and why he is participating in a secret government project to increase the size of invasive ants. He explains that the "square-cube law" dictates that an ever-increasingly size-mutated ant will at some point collapse under its own mass.

== Reception ==
"giANTS" won the Nebula Award for Best Short Story of 1979, and was nominated for the 1980 Hugo Award for Best Short Story. Gary Westfahl has noted that the story is based on the fact that giant insects "would be unable to walk or sustain themselves".
