= Camp Blood (film) =

- DVD cover
- Directed by: Brad Sykes
- Written by: Brad Sykes
- Produced by: David S. Sterling
- Starring: Jennifer Ritchkoff; Michael Taylor; Tim Young; Betheny Zolt; Courtney Taylor
- Cinematography: Jeff Leroy
- Edited by: Jeff Leroy
- Music by: Ghost
- Production company: SNJ Productions
- Distributed by: Astro Distribution; Dead Alive Productions; Intervision Picture Corp. Severin Films; Razor Digital Entertainment
- Release date: April 4, 2000 (United States)
- Running time: 73 minutes
- Country: United States

Camp Blood is a 1999 American direct-to-video slasher film, written and directed by Brad Sykes. It was followed by seven official sequels, one official spin-off entitled "Ghost of Camp Blood" and one unofficial film entitled Within the Woods. Camp Blood stars Jennifer Ritchkoff as a young woman who travels to a deserted camp with her friends, only to find themselves at the mercies of a killer clown. The film had a home video release on April 4, 2000, and was released to DVD in 2002.

== Plot ==
The film opens up on birdwatcher Sally and her photographer Victor, who are making love in the woods of Camp Blackwood. They are suddenly attacked by a person wearing a boiler suit and clown mask, wielding a machete. The clown kills Victor and chases Sally through the woods, swinging the machete at her before the film cuts to the opening credits.

The story then focuses on Tricia, her boyfriend Steve, Steve's friend Jay and Jay's girlfriend Nicole. These four are going on a trip to Camp Blackwood. But Tricia has reservations about the trip to Camp Blackwood, due to the newspaper reporting on the disappearance of Sally, for her car was found at Camp Blackwood. Steve convinces Tricia otherwise, and the two couples head out to the camp in Jay's car.

Meanwhile, at the camp, two deer hunters, Gus and George, discover Sally still alive, bloodied and bruised. The clown then appears and murders the three of them.

Back with the main characters, they've been on the road for over an hour, and are in need of directions to the camp. On the side of the road, they stop and talk to a nutty town local by the name of Bromley Thatcher. Thatcher gives them grief for polluting the town with their loud music, fast food trash, ignorance and disrespect to the locals. After a brief exchange that includes a warning from Thatcher about the clown, Thatcher begrudgingly gives them directions to the camp, now known to them and the audience as 'Camp Blood'.

In the woods, they meet their guide, a butch lesbian known as Harris, who seems to be attracted to Nicole, creepily watching her and Jay from time to time. Tricia asks Harris if she's heard anything about the clown or why the place is nicknamed 'Camp Blood', but Harris says she has no idea.

After spending the day doing menial tasks such as collecting firewood and setting up camp, the group have a campfire, wanting to tell ghost stories. Harris reveals that she does indeed know the story of the Camp and of the clown, and tells them the story. Twenty years prior, a man by the name of Stanley Cunningham was fired from his job, and came home to find his girlfriend Marylou in bed with a man named Nathan. Stanley knocked them both out in a fit of rage, put them in the trunk of his car, donned a clown mask, and drove them out to the camp where he proceeded to murder them. The police found the bodies three weeks later, but Stanley Cunningham disappeared, never to be seen again. Although, over the years people have gone missing, and some townsfolk claim to have seen the clown wander the woods from time to time. Steve, Jay and Nicole enjoy the story, believing it to be just a story Harris made up to spook them. But Tricia gets creeped out by it, and is unnerved for the rest of the night.

After the group settles down into their respective tents for the night, the group awake in the morning to find the burnt-out carcass of Harris on the campfire. Tricia begins to panic, believing that the clown story is true, and they're going to be picked off one by one. Steve calms her down, reaffirming that it was just a story Harris concocted to scare them, and nothing more. Whoever killed Harris, though, has to still be out in the woods, and they need to leave as soon as possible. Steve begins to lead the group back to Jay's car, but Nicole sprains her ankle, forcing the group to have to carry her. The clown appears, and gets into a fight with Steve, who pulls out his survival knife to defend himself. The fight ends with Steve's death as he gets his arm and head hacked into with the machete. The clown punches Tricia, and intimidates Jay to back off as the clown carries Nicole away. Tricia and Jay fight over Steve's knife, but Jay punches Tricia, and goes to get Nicole back, leaving Tricia to escape on her own.

Jay gets lost looking for the clown and Nicole, and begins to lose his mind. Nicole managed to get away from the clown off-screen, but bumps into Jay, who turns around and accidentally stabs Nicole, fatally killing her. The clown appears, and Jay, having completely lost it, allows the clown to snap his neck, killing him.

Tricia manages to get back to the car, but runs into Thatcher. Tricia pleads him to help her, for the clown is after her and has killed her friends. Thatcher reveals that the clown story was made up by him and some of the other locals to scare tourists like her and her friends away. The clown then appears, and Thatcher reveals that he is in cahoots with the clown when he tries to chloroform Tricia. Tricia manages to fight the two of them off, and begins to run away, with the clown in pursuit. Thatcher, now in possession of Jay's car keys, gets in and follows them with the car. In his frustration and anger, Thatcher accidentally hits the clown with the car, supposedly killing the clown. Thatcher bawls over his loss as Tricia takes the machete and hacks Thatcher to death. Tricia unmasks the clown, revealing the killer to be Harris. As Tricia gets into the car, Harris dons the mask again, and Tricia hits her again, finally killing her. As Tricia drives away in hysterics, she hallucinates the clown appearing in the backseat, who proceeds to choke Tricia out. Tricia stops the car, and loses consciousness as she hallucinates this.

Tricia regains consciousness, finding herself in a padded room. A doctor and a detective come in to check up on Tricia. She was catatonic when the police found her four days prior, and she has been in there ever since. The detective then asks about all of the victims throughout the movie, and Tricia tells him that it was Harris who did it, dressed as a clown. The detective, however, states that they did not find a clown, but they found Harris Stanley's blood all over Trica's hands, face, and all over Jay's car when they found her four days ago. Tricia then realizes that Harris Stanley was Stanley Cunningham in the story, and Harris had been using the clown legend to get away with killing people. But Tricia also realizes that Marylou and Nathan were never found; the town believes that the two of them ran off together twenty years ago, for the 'Camp Blood' story to the locals is just a story they made up to scare tourists away. Meaning, Tricia's claim to Harris being the clown can't be proven, and now with both her doctor and the detective believing her to be insane, she will be charged with the murders of her friends and others. Tricia hysterically tries to explain to the detective and the doctor, but they restrain her and have a nurse give her a sedative. As Tricia begins to lose consciousness, and everyone leaves her in the room alone, she hallucinates the clown being in the room with her and screams.

== Cast ==
- Jennifer Ritchkoff as Tricia Young
- Michael Taylor as Steven Jessup / Doctor West
- Tim Young as Jason Helman / Detective Hamlin
- Bethany Zolt as Nicole Starred / Nurse
- Courtney Taylor as Harris Stanley
- Joseph Haggerty as Bromley Thatcher
- Merideth O'Brien as Sally Brennan
- Vinnie Bilancio as Victor Konenkamp
- Ron Ford as Gus Franko
- Tim Sullivan as George Guffy
- Ivonne Armant as Mary Lou Maloney
- Randy Rice as Nathan Cobb (Mary Lou's Lover)
- Shemp Moseley as The Clown
- Intimacy Coordinator as Kevin McRoper

Ivonne Armant's character shares a name with the ghostly slasher Mary Lou Maloney from Hello Mary Lou: Prom Night II (1987) and Prom Night III: The Last Kiss (1990). However, since Armant's character seems strictly mortal in nature, it is presumed that the two characters are not meant to be one and the same.

For whatever reason, actors Michael Taylor, Tim Young and Bethany Zolt portray the roles of Doctor West, Detective Hamlin and a Nurse respectively. The casting choice of these three have to be leaded to some debate that the ending to the film was intended to be in reference to The Cabinet of Dr. Caligari, in which the main events of the story were revealed to have been inside the head of a mental patient, who hallucinated other patients and hospital staff as characters in their story. This was proven false by the events of Camp Blood 2, in which the character of Doctor West still exists, except now being portrayed by actor Tim Sullivan.

== Reception ==
Digital Retribution gave the film a score of one out of five, calling it "a fairly typical slasher", and criticized the film's acting, script, and poor gore effects.

== Sequels ==
Sykes quickly followed up his 1999 release of Camp Blood with a sequel, Camp Blood 2, released on April 4, 2000, a full year after the first one. A third film, Within the Woods, was released in 2005. Sykes wrote and directed both sequels, and actress Jennifer Ritchkoff reprised her role as Tricia Young for Camp Blood 2, but did not return for the third film.

A fourth film was released at the beginning of 2014 entitled Camp Blood First Slaughter, which was written and directed by Mark Polonia. Three more films were released in 2016: Camp Blood 4, Camp Blood 5, and Camp Blood 666. These were followed by Camp Blood 7 in 2017, The Ghost of Camp Blood (a spin-off film) in 2018 and Camp Blood 8: Revelations In 2019. These films do not take into account the third movie created by Brad Sykes in the Camp Blood series, Within the Woods.
