= Brad Sykes =

American screenwriter and film director

- Occupations: Film director, producer, screenwriter
- Years active: 1998–present
- Spouse: Josephina Sykes

Brad Sykes is an American screenwriter and film director.

== Biography ==
Sykes attended Boston University's film program. After moving to Los Angeles, Sykes made his feature debut with the horror comedy Scream Queen.

Sykes has since written and directed multiple horror films, including Camp Blood and its first two sequels. Sykes' other writing-directing credits include Goth, Mad Jack, Demon's Kiss, and Plaguers.

Sykes lives in Los Angeles with his wife, producer Josephina Sykes, where they operate Nightfall Pictures, a development and production company they started in 2004. Sykes published his first book "Terror in the Desert: Dark Cinema of the American Southwest" (McFarland and Co.) in 2018. In 2023, Brad's second book Neon Nightmares - L.A. Thrillers of the 1980-s, is published by Bear Manor Media, a book dedicated to the neo noir off the beaten paths movies shot in the City of Angels.

== Filmography ==
=== Writer-director only ===
- Camp Blood (V – direct-to-video release, 1999)
- Nightmare in Shallow Point (2000; writer only)
- Camp Blood 2 (V, 2000)
- Babes in the Woods (V, 2000)
- Mad Jack (V, 2000; also producer)
- Zombie Chronicles (V, 2001; director only)
- Evil Sister 2 (V, 2001)
- B-Witched (V, 2001)
- Witchcraft XII: In the Lair of the Serpent (V, 2002)
- Loving Angelique (V, 2002)
- Death Factory (V, 2002)
- The Coven (V, 2002; director only)
- Demon's Kiss (V, 2002)
- Lord of the Vampires (2002; also producer)
- Liars (V, 2002; writer only)
- Scream Queen (V, 2002)
- The Pact (2003; writer only)
- Goth (V, 2003)
- Bloody Tease (V, 2004; director only)
- Within the Woods (unofficial third Camp Blood film) (V, 2005)
- Mutation (V, 2006)
- Plaguers (2008)
- "Hi-8" /"Horror Independent 8" (2013)
- "Hi-Death" (2018)
- "Hi-Fear" (2022)

=== Producer ===
- Dead Letters aka Cold Ones (2009; co-producer)
- Burying the Ex (2008; producer)
- Burying the Ex (2014; co-executive producer)
