= Melanie Tem =

American novelist

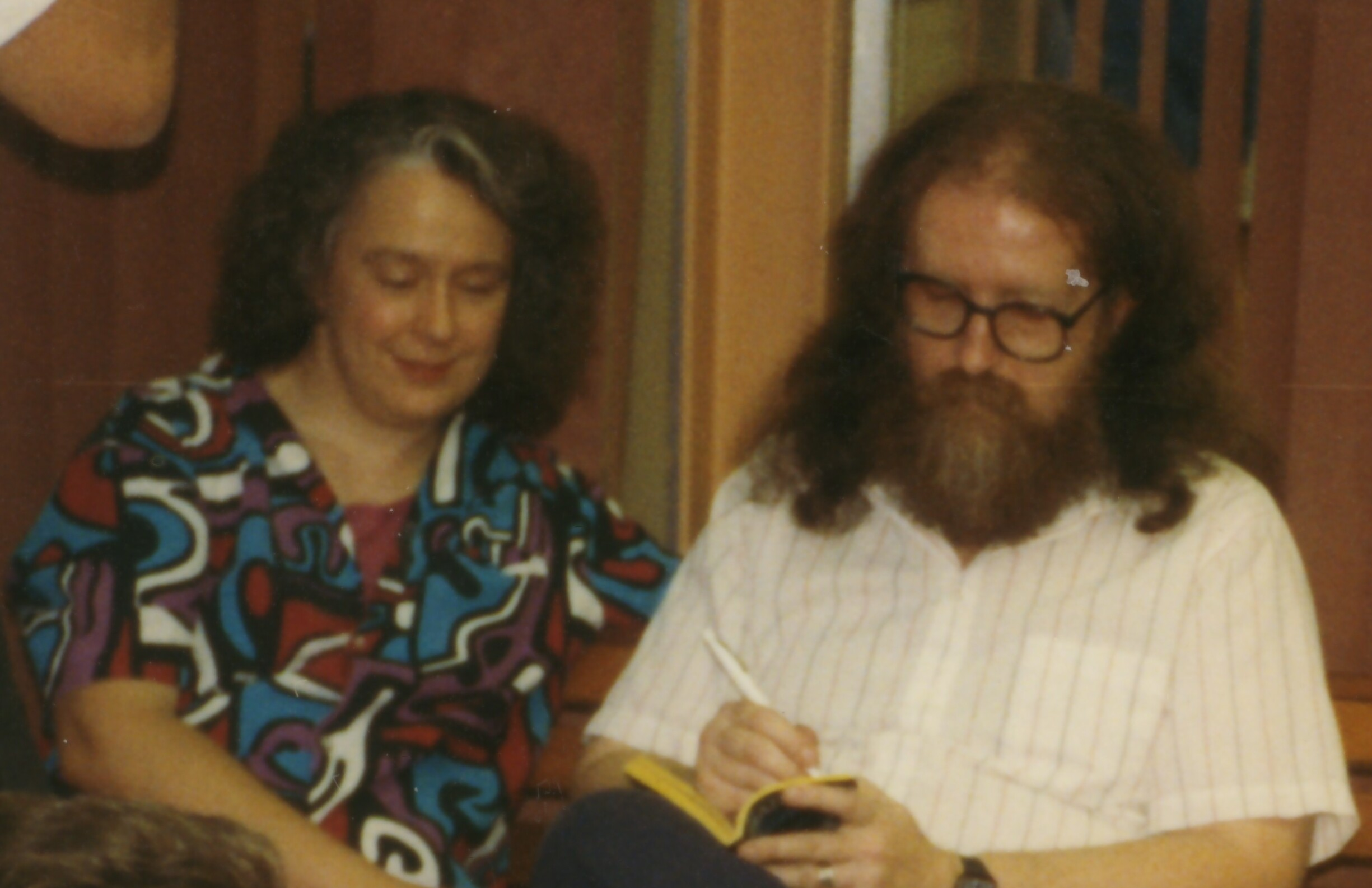
- Tem and her husband Steve in 1992
- Born: Melanie Kubachko; April 11, 1949
- Died: February 9, 2015 (aged 65)
- Education: Allegheny College (BA); University of Denver (MSW)
- Occupations: Author, social worker
- Spouse: Steve Rasnic Tem
- Children: 4

Melanie Tem (née Kubachko; April 11, 1949 – February 9, 2015) was an American horror and dark fantasy author, and social worker.

== Early life and education ==
Melanie Kubachko grew up in Saegertown, Pennsylvania. She attended Allegheny College as an undergraduate, and earned her master's in social work at the University of Denver in Colorado.

== Career ==
Tem also mentored students through critiquing and private workshops. When Tem wasn't writing, she worked as a social worker and administrator with the elderly, disabled, and children.

Melanie and her husband have collaborated on several novels such as Daughters (2001), and The Man on the Ceiling (2008). On collaborating with her husband, Melanie stated, “Steve and I have been each other’s first editor for more than thirty-four years now. Nothing leaves the house until the other has read and commented on it”.

=== Inspiration ===
Tem has been featured in numerous essays and anthologies. Tem said that she prefers the term "dark fantasy" instead of being described as a horror author because she wants to disturb people, not scare them. Tem also has a theme of transformation in her writings. In a 1993 interview with Cemetery Dance Publications, Tem elaborated on this stating “one of the things that interests me is how dark, disturbing experiences in our lives can transform us for the better, how we can come through those things . . . I like the idea of how we confront things”. Tem often used traditional horror and supernatural motifs to express psychological truth (i.e. using a werewolf to symbolize anger). Tem found inspiration working as a social worker and has explained how it has impacted her writing. When connecting her writing and social work, Tem said, “I went into social work probably for one of the same reasons why I write. And that is, again, to try to understand somebody whose life experience I don't have. Another is that social work brings one into contact with all kinds of stories that can be told. I have never written whole cloth about a particular client, but very often I will come into contact with someone, and something in my mind will say, "'There's a story in that'".

The grieving process following the passing of her son inspired Melanie Tem’s short story, Lightning Rod. Tem described the writing process for Lightning Rod as therapeutic and how she felt the responsibility to protect her family from “feeling the pain”.

=== Oral storytelling ===
In addition to her short stories and novels, Tem also performed oral storytelling. Tem began her storytelling with a small memory then improvised the remainder of the story.

In one of her stories, Come Live with Me, Tem tells the story of her relationship with her father growing up and into her adult life. As a child, she describes her father as a “guarded man” and “distant”. In her story, Tem explains how her father would correct her voice, pronunciation, and speaking, and as a child. Tem then moves into the end of her father's life where he begins to lose his memory. Tem and her father would use poetry to bond. Her father would repeat the line, “Come live with me and be my love,” referencing Christopher Marlowe’s poem, the Passionate Shepherd to His Love. In addition to her father’s memory loss, his speech begins to fail. Tem finds herself having to correct her father’s pronunciation, just as he did to her as a child.

Melanie Tem’s oral story Cousins tells the story of the competitive nature that her and her cousin, Claudette, encountered with each other while growing up. Tem and Claudette’s tensions first started when Claudette claims that Tem’s mother “stole her name” from her family and often teased Melanie growing up. Tem describes a photo of the two as children coloring with both of their tongues sticking out indicating their concentration, which Tem referred to as a “family trait”. Tem continues with a story of a road trip to Quebec, Canada where they talk about their family history that they cannot agree on. On this trip, Melanie and Claudette run into a bachelor's party where Tem loses Claudette and doesn't find her until late at night back at their hotel. Claudette explains that she ran into a street artist, despite Melanie not remembering any street artists in the area. The street artist inspires Claudette to become an artist and Melanie visits her at an art festival years later. Tem recalls an awkward conversation between her and Claudette asking her why she always made fun of her as a child. She ends the story quoting her cousin saying, “I wasn’t making fun of you. I wanted to be you…you're my hero”.

=== "Dhost" (2007) ===
The short story "Dhost" exemplifies Tem's identification as a dark fantasy writer instead of horror. Tem got the inspiration for the title from the idea of a child mispronouncing the word “ghost”.

== Reception ==
Well-known horror author, Stephen King, described her work as “spectacular, far better than anything by new writers in the hardcover field”. On Tem's novel Prodigal(1991), Dan Simmons applauded it saying, “Melanie Tem may be the literary successor to Shirley Jackson”. Edward Bryant described Prodigal as being written “surely and precisely” and compared it to Stephen King's Pet Sematary but she "digs even deeper into the disturbing, layered, complex, collective psyche of a family in deep trouble”. "Dhost"(2007) has been praised because ” small twists of this short story can trace a parallel to distant parent figures, to the loss of self in search and yearn for another. It is penned to be as bittersweet as it is eerie”.

== Personal life ==
Tem met her husband, Steve Rasnic, at a writer's workshop and they were married for 35 years they had 4 children . She developed breast cancer in 1997. In 2013, it recurred, and metastasized to her bones, bone marrow, and organs. She died at age 65 on February 9, 2015.

== Bibliography ==
=== Novels ===
- Prodigal (1991)
- Blood Moon (1992)
- Wilding (1992)
- Making Love (1993) (with Nancy Holder)
- Revenant (1994)
- Desmodus (1995)
- Witch-Light (1996) (with Nancy Holder)
- The Tides (1996)
- Black River (1997)
- Daughters (2001) (with Steve Rasnic Tem)
- Slain in the Spirit (2002)
- The Deceiver (2003)
- The Man on the Ceiling (2008) (with Steve Rasnic Tem)
- What You Remember I Did (2011) (with Janet Berliner)
- The Yellow Wood (2015)

=== Collections ===
- Daddy's Side (1991)
- Beautiful Stranger (1992) (with Steve Rasnic Tem)
- The Ice Downstream: A Short Story Collection (2001)
- In Concert (2010) (with Steve Rasnic Tem)
- The Devil's Coattails: More Dispatches From the Dark Frontier (2011)

=== Short stories ===
- "Aspen Graffiti" (1988)
- "The Better Half" (1989)
- "Lightning Rod" (1990)
- "The Co-Op" (1990)
- "Daddy's Sid" (1991)
- "Fry Day" (1991)
- "Trail of Crumbs" (1992)
- "Jenny" (1993)
- "The Changelings" (1993)
- "Half Grandma" (1995)
- "Wife of Fifty Years" (1995)
- "Pandorette's Mother" (1996)
- "Aunt Libby's Grave" (1997)
- "Hagoday" (1998)
- "The Lonely Gorilla" (1999)
- "Alicia" (2000)
- "Piano Bar Blues" (2001)
- "Visits" (2004)
- "Dhost" (2007)
- "Monster" (2008)
- "The Shoes" (2010)
- "Corn Teeth" (2011)
- "Dahlias" (2012)
- "Timbrel and Pipe" (2014)

=== Anthologies featuring Melanie Tem ===
- Skin of the Soul (1990)
- Best New Horror 2 (1991)
- Dark Voices 3 (1991)
- The Mammoth Book of Vampires (1992)
- The Year's Best Fantasy and Horror Fifth Annual Collection (1992)
- Dark Voices 5 (1992)
- Nursery Crimes (1993)
- The Best of Whispers (1994)
- Little Deaths (1994)
- Love in Vein (1994)
- Peter S Beagle's Immortal Unicorn 2 (1995)
- The Best New Horror 5 (1995)
- Xanadu 3 (1995)
- Splatterpunks II (1995)
- Great Writers and Kids Write Spooky Stories (1995)
- Desire Burn (1995)
- Peter S Beagle's Immortal Unicorn (1995)
- Sisters of the Night (1995)
- 100 Tiny Tales of Terror (1996)
- Dark Terrors 3 (1997)
- Going Postal (1998)
- In the Shadow of the Gargoyle (1998)
- 100 Twisted Little Tales of Torment (1998)
- Silver Birch, Blood Moon (1999)
- Isaac Asimov's Mother's Day (2000)
- Dark Terrors 5 (2000)

== Awards ==
Prodigal

- Bram Stoker Award for First Novel

The Man on the Ceiling (with Steve Rasnic Tem)

- Bram Stoker Award for Best Long Fiction
- World Fantasy Award for Best Novella
- International Horror Guild Award for Best Long Story
- British Fantasy Award – Icarus Award (1992)

Imagination Box (multimedia CD)

- Bram Stoker Award for Best Alternative Forms

== See also ==
- List of horror fiction authors
