= Edward Bryant =

American writer (1945–2017)

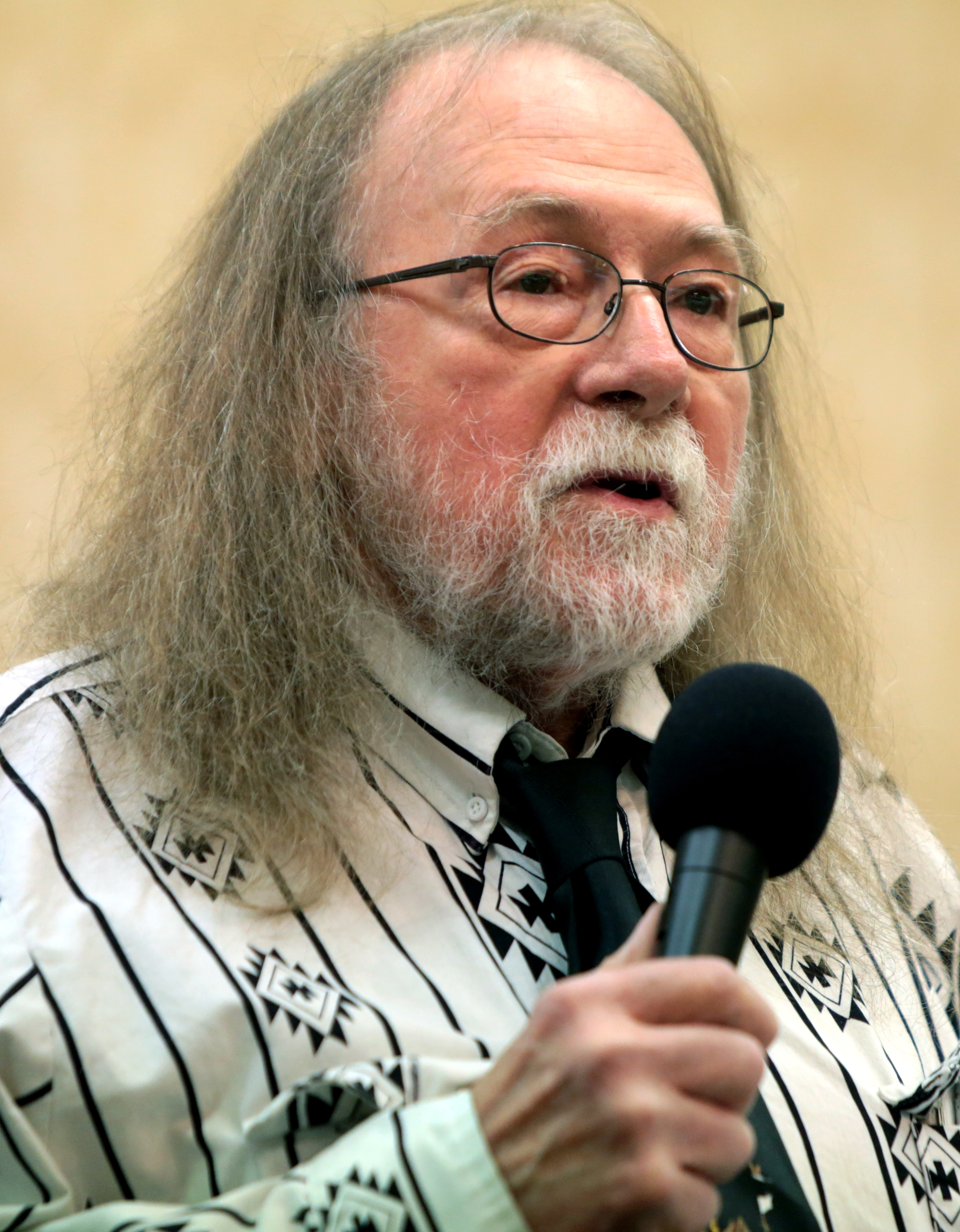
- Bryant in 2016
- Born: Edward Winslow Bryant Jr. August 27, 1945; White Plains, New York, United States
- Died: February 10, 2017 (aged 71); Denver, Colorado, United States
- Education: University of Wyoming
- Occupation: Writer
- Writing career
- Genres: Science fiction; horror
- Notable works: CINNABAR, PARTICLE THEORY

Edward Winslow Bryant Jr. (August 27, 1945 – February 10, 2017) was an American science fiction and horror writer sometimes associated with the Dangerous Visions series of anthologies that bolstered The New Wave. At the time of his death, he resided in North Denver.

== Life and work ==
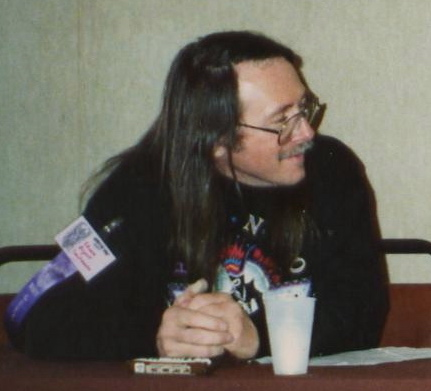
Ed Bryant in 1989

Bryant was born in White Plains, New York, but raised on a cattle ranch in Wyoming. He attended school in Wheatland, Wyoming, and received his MA in English from the University of Wyoming in 1968.

During the 1950s his uncle, a rodeo star, encouraged his love of film. This perhaps ultimately led to his occasional work in screenplays and as an actor. He was in the films The Laughing Dead (1988) and Ill Met by Moonlight (1994).

His writing career began in 1968 with his attendance at the Clarion Workshop. At the beginning of his career he developed an association with Harlan Ellison, which led to collaborative efforts such as the novel Phoenix Without Ashes, based on Ellison's pilot script for The Starlost.

He won two Nebula Awards for his short stories, "Stone" (1978) and "giANTS" (1979). He was mostly known as a writer of short fiction; however, he also wrote poetry, nonfiction, reviews, criticism, and edited an e-zine. His short horror story "Dark Angel", which appeared in Kirby McCauley's anthology Dark Forces, featured modern-day witch Angela Black. She reappears as the narrator of Bryant's short novel Fetish.

When Bryant moved to Denver in 1972, he founded the Northern Colorado Writers Workshop, which continues today, and has produced a number of notable writers, including Steve Rasnic Tem, Melanie Tem, John Dunning, Wil McCarthy, Bruce Holland Rogers, Dan Simmons, and Connie Willis. Bryant was a senior editor of Wormhole Books. In addition, he facilitated a number of other writing workshops over the years for writers ranging in skill and experience from amateur to professional.

Edward Bryant served as Toastmaster for Denvention II, the 1981 Worldcon, as well as World Fantasy Convention, ArmadilloCon, TusCon, and Death Equinox. He was Master of Ceremonies at the 1994 World Horror Convention, Special Guest in 1996, and Chair in 2000.

== Illness and death ==
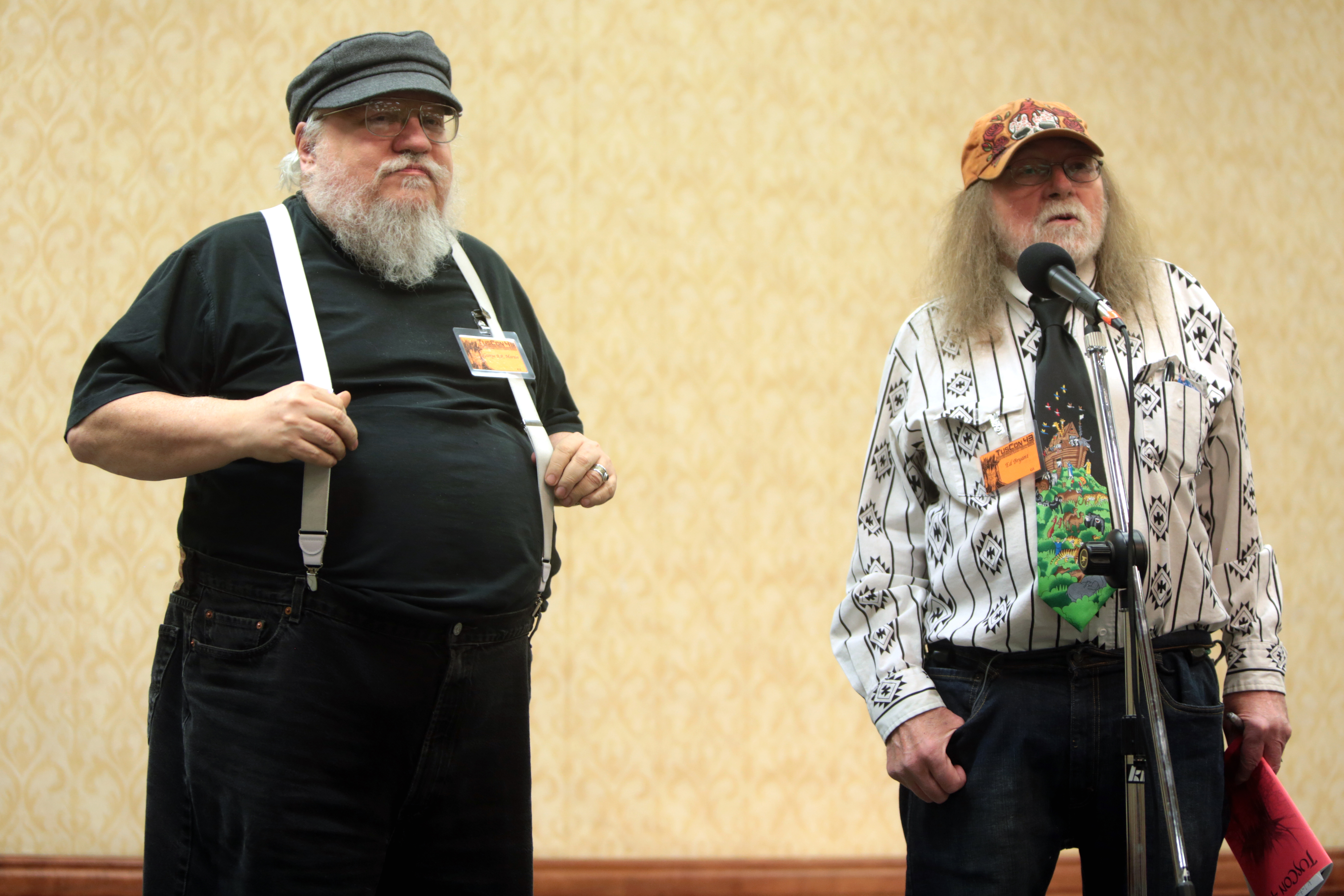
Bryant (right) with George R. R. Martin (left) in November 2016 at TusCon in Tucson, Arizona.

In 2010, various writers & editors including Melanie Tem and Ellen Datlow set up a Crowd-funding page to help Bryant deal with financial emergencies brought on by his ongoing fight against the effects of Type 1 diabetes.

Bryant died at his home in Colorado on February 10, 2017, after a long illness. He was 71.

== Works ==
=== Novels ===
- Phoenix Without Ashes (1975, with Harlan Ellison). An adaptation of Harlan Ellison's pilot script for The Starlost

=== Mosaic novels ===
Wild Cards series

- Bantam Books #1. Wild Cards (1987). Story "Down Deep" (with Leanne C. Harper)
- Bantam Books #3. Jokers Wild (1987). Segments with the character "Sewer Jack"
- Bantam Books #4. Aces Abroad (1988). Story "Down in the Dreamtime"
- Bantam Books #5. Down and Dirty (1988). Story "The Second Coming of Buddy Holly"
- Bantam Books #11. Dealer's Choice (1992). Segments with the character "Wyungare"

=== Short story collections ===
- Among the Dead and Other Events Leading Up to the Apocalypse (1973). Contains 17 short stories:
  - "The Hanged Man" (1972)
  - "Shark" (1973)
  - "No. 2 Plain Tank Auxiliary Fill Structural Limit 17,605 lbs. Fuel-PWA Spec. 522 Revised" (1972)
  - "Adrift on the Freeway" (1970)
  - "Jody After the War" (1972)
  - "Teleidoscope" (1973)
  - "The Poet in the Hologram in the Middle of Prime Time" (1972)
  - "The Human Side of the Village Monster" (1971)
  - "Among the Dead" (1971)
  - "File on the Plague" (1971)
  - "The Soft Blue Bunny Rabbit Story" (1971)
  - "Tactics" (1973)
  - "Sending the Very Best" (1970)
  - "Their Thousandth Season" (1972)
  - "Love Song of Herself" (1971)
  - "Pinup" (1973)
  - "Dune's Edge" (1972)
- Cinnabar (1976). Contains 8 short stories:
  - "The Road to Cinnabar" (1971)
  - "Jade Blue" (1971)
  - "Gray Matters", AKA "Their Thousandth Season" (1972)
  - "The Legend of Cougar Lou Landis" (1973)
  - "Hayes and the Heterogyne" (1974) (Novelette)
  - "Years Later" (1976)
  - "Sharking Down" (1975) (Novelette)
  - "Brain Terminal" (1975) (Novelette)
- Wyoming Sun (1980). Contains 5 short stories:
  - "Prairie Sun" (1980)
  - "giANTS" (1979)
  - "Teeth Marks" (1979)
  - "Beyond the Sand River Range" (1972)
  - "Strata" (1980) (Novelette)
- Particle Theory (1981). Contains 12 short stories:
  - "Particle Theory" (1977)
  - "The Thermals of August" (1981) (Novelette)
  - "Hayes and the Heterogyne" (1974) (Novelette)
  - "Teeth Marks" (1979)
  - "Winslow Crater" (1978) (Poem)
  - "Shark" (1973)
  - "Precession" (1980)
  - "Stone" (1978)
  - "Strata" (1980) (Novelette)
  - "The Hibakusha Gallery" (1977)
  - "giANTS" (1979)
  - "To See" (1980)
- Neon Twilight (1990). Contains 3 short stories:
  - "Waiting in Crouched Halls" (1970)
  - "Pilots of the Twilight" (1984) (Novelette)
  - "Neon" (1990)
- Darker Passions (1992). Contains 3 short stories:
  - "Doing Colfax" (1987)
  - "The Loneliest Number" (1990)
  - "Human Remains" (1992)
- The Baku: Tales of the Nuclear Age (2001). Contains 3 short stories:
  - "The Baku" (1987) (Novelette)
  - "The Hibakusha Gallery" (1977)
  - "Jody After the War" (1972)
- Trilobyte (2014). Contains 3 short stories:
  - "An Easter Treasure" (1987)
  - "Coon Dawgs" (1987)
  - "Drummer's Star" (1987)
- Predators and Other Stories (2014). Contains 6 short stories:
  - "Predators" (1987)
  - "The Baku" (1987) (Novelette)
  - "Frat Rat Bash" (1987)
  - "Haunted" (1987)
  - "Buggage" (1987)
  - "Doing Colfax" (1987)

=== Short stories ===
Uncollected short stories

- "In the Silent World" (1970)
- "They Only Come in Dreams" (1970)
- "Eyes of Onyx" (1971)
- "Her Lover's Name Was Death" (1971)
- "The Lurker in the Locked Bedroom" (1971)
- "Audition: Soon to Be a Major Production" (1972)
- "Beside Still Waters" (1972, with James Sutherland)
- "Darling, When You Hurt Me" (1972)
- "Nova Morning" (1972, with Jody Harper)
- "The 10:00 Report is Brought to You By ..." (1972)
- "2.46593" (1973)
- "Nightmare Syndrome" (1973)
- "Paths" (1973)
- "And Then He Died" (1974)
- "Cowboys, Indians" (1974)
- "Going West" (1974)
- "Xenofreak/Xenophobe" (1975)
- "Kicks Are For Kids" (1978)
- "Dark Angel" (1980)
- "We'll Have Such a Good Time, Lover" (1980)
- "This Is the Way the World Ends, Soggily" (1981)
- "Freezing to Death" (1982)
- Angie Black series:
  1. In the Shade (1982)
  2. Armageddon Between Sets (1984)
  3. Fetish (1991) (Novelette)
- "Bean Bag Cats®" (1983)
- "Dancing Chickens" (1984)
- "Party Time" (1984)
- "The Man of the Future" (1984)
- "The Serrated Edge" (1984)
- "The Man Who Always Wanted to Travel" (1985)
- "The Overly Familiar" (1985)
- "Presents of Mind" (1986, with Connie Willis, Steve Rasnic Tem, Dan Simmons)
- "The Transfer" (1986)
- "Author's Notes" (1987)
- "A Functional Proof of Immortality" (1988)
- "Chrysalis" (1988)
- "Skin and Blood" (1988)
- "The Cutter" (1988)
- "While She Was Out" (1988)
- "A Sad Last Love at the Diner of the Damned" (1989) (Novelette)
- "Good Kids" (1989)
- "Mod Dogs" (1989)
- "'Saurus Wrecks" (1989)
- "Dying Is Easy, Comedy Is Hard" (1990, with Dan Simmons) (Novelette)
- "Slippage" (1990)
- "Colder Than Hell" (1991)
- "Country Mouse" (1991)
- "Down Home" (1991)
- "The Great Steam Bison of Cycad Center" (1991) (Novelette)
- "Aqua Sancta" (1993)
- "The Fire That Scours" (1994)
- "Big Dogs, Strange Days" (1995)
- "Calling the Lightning by Name" (1995)
- "Flirting with Death" (1995)
- "Raptured Up in Blue" (1995)
- "Disillusion" (1996)
- "Talkin' Trailer Trash" (1996)
- "Ashes on Her Lips" (1998)
- "Knock" (1998, AKA Ed Bryant)
- "Styx and Bones" (1999) (Appeared in 999: Twenty-Nine Original Tales of Horror and Suspense, an anthology edited by Al Sarrantonio)
- "The Clock That Counts the Dead" (1999)
- "The Flicker Man" (1999, with Trey Barker) (Novelette)
- "Shuttlecock" (1999) (Novelette)
- "Mr. Twisted" (2000, AKA Ed Bryant)
- "Everything Broken" (2003)
- "Bad German" (2010)
- "Marginal Hants" (2015)
- "Bitten Off" (2017)
- "War Stories" (2024) (Appeared in "The Last Dangerous Visions", 2024 an anthology edited by Harlan Ellison) (Novelette)

=== Chapbooks ===
- The Man of the Future (1990)
- Fetish (1991)
- The Cutter (1991)
- The Thermals of August (1992)
- Aqua Sancta (1993)
- While She Was Out (2001)

=== Anthologies ===
- 2076: The American Tricentennial (1977, with Jo Ann Harper)
- The Shadow on the Doorstep / Trilobyte (1987, with James P. Blaylock)

== Awards ==
Awards for Edward Bryant
Year	Award	Category	Work	Result	Ref.
1974	Nebula Award	Short Story	Shark	Nominated	
1976	Locus Award	Novella	Sharking Down	Nominated	
1977	World Fantasy Award	Collection	Cinnabar	Nominated	
1978	Locus Award	Short Fiction	Particle Theory	Nominated	
1978	Nebula Award	Short Story	The Hibakusha Gallery	Nominated	
1978	Nebula Award	Novelette	Particle Theory	Nominated	
1979	Nebula Award	Short Story	Stone	Won	
1979	Hugo Award	Short Story	Stone	Nominated	
1979	Locus Award	Short Story	Stone	Nominated	
1980	Nebula Award	Short Story	giANTS	Won	
1980	Locus Award	Short Story	giANTS	Nominated	
1980	Hugo Award	Short Story	giANTS	Nominated	
1981	Locus Award	Short Story	Prairie Sun	Nominated	
1981	Locus Award	Novelette	Strata	Nominated	
1981	Nebula Award	Novelette	Strata	Nominated	
1982	Locus Award	Single Author Collection	Particle Theory	Nominated	
1982	Locus Award	Novelette	The Thermals of August	Nominated	
1982	Hugo Award	Novelette	The Thermals of August	Nominated	
1982	Nebula Award	Novelette	The Thermals of August	Nominated	
1985	Locus Award	Short Story	Armageddon Between Sets	Nominated	
1989	Bram Stoker Award	Short Fiction	A Sad Last Love at the Diner of the Damned	Nominated	
1990	World Fantasy Award	Short Fiction	A Sad Last Love at the Diner of the Damned	Nominated	
1990	Locus Award	Novelette	A Sad Last Love at the Diner of the Damned	Nominated	
1990	Bram Stoker Award	Short Fiction	The Loneliest Number	Nominated	
1991	Bram Stoker Award	Long Fiction	Fetish	Nominated	
1992	Locus Award	Novella	Fetish	Nominated	
1995	Locus Award	Short Story	The Fire that Scours	Nominated	
1995	Theodore Sturgeon Award		The Fire that Scours	Finalist	
1996	International Horror Guild Award	Living Legend Award		Won	

== See also ==
- List of horror fiction authors
- splatterpunk
