= Camp Blood 2 =

- Directed by: Brad Sykes
- Written by: Brad Sykes
- Produced by: David S. Sterling
- Starring: Jennifer Ritchkoff; Garrett Clancy; Missy Rae Hansen; Ken X Mark Overholt; Jane Johnson; Timothy Patrick; Courtney Burr; Lisa Marie Bolick; Tim Sullivan; Brannon Gould; Natasha Corrigan; Leana Masiello; Bret Ellington
- Cinematography: Jeff Leroy
- Edited by: Jeff Leroy
- Music by: Ghost
- Distributed by: Sterling Entertainment
- Release date: April 4, 2000
- Running time: 75 minutes
- Country: United States
- Language: English

Camp Blood 2 is a 2000 American slasher film, and sequel to Camp Blood. The film was directed by Brad Sykes and produced by David S. Sterling. It was followed in 2005 by Within the Woods.

== Plot ==
One year after the events of the first movie film maker Worthy Milligan decides to shoot a film based upon the murders and hires Tricia, the traumatized sole survivor of the massacre, as a technical advisor. However, once Tricia, Milligan and the rest of the cast and crew trek into the woods, the nightmare becomes all too real as the clown reappears and begins to butcher the hapless crew members.

After most of the cast and crew have been killed over, Tricia is captured by the killer who reveals herself to be Adrienne, who is the sister of Harris, the perpetrator of the original killings, who blames Tricia for the death of Harris. As the two wrestle, Tricia uses a lighter to set the gasoline soaked Adrienne on fire. During their final struggle, Tricia retrieves Adrienne's machete and slashes her neck open. Adrienne gives Tricia her mask before she dies of her wounds and Tricia flees carrying the mask and machete.

== Cast ==
- Jennifer Ritchkoff as Tricia Young
- Garrett Clancy as Worth Milligan
- Missy Rae Hansen as Adrienne Palmer
- Danny Rayfield as the Clown

== Release ==
The film was released on DVD by Film 2000 on March 18, 2002. On March 26, that same year it was released by Speedo.

== Reception ==
Digital Retribution gave the film a negative review, writing, "Boring, pretentious, pompous and featuring a disappearing clown on fire, there's little reason to watch this. Actually, the only reason to watch is that glorious quote about juice and killer clowns, and since you've already read it, there's now no reason to waste your time on this dreck."

== Sequels ==
A third unofficial film, Within the Woods, was released five years later in 2005. Brad Sykes who wrote and directed both the first and second movie returned for Within the Woods, but actress Jennifer Ritchkoff did not reprise her role as Tricia Young for the third film.

The fourth sequel was released at the beginning 2014 with Camp Blood First Slaughter, which was written and directed by Mark Polonia, and is sometimes referred to as Camp Blood 3. Three more films were released in 2016: Camp Blood 4, Camp Blood 5, and Camp Blood 666. These were followed by It Kills: Camp Blood 7 in 2017, The Ghost of Camp Blood (a spin-off film) in 2018 and Camp Blood 8: Revelations In 2019. These films do not take into account the third movie created by Brad Sykes in the Camp Blood series, Within the Woods.
