= International Horror Guild Award =

Literary award

The International Horror Guild Award (also known as the IHG Award) was an accolade recognizing excellence in the field of horror/dark fantasy, presented by the International Horror Guild (IHG) from 1995 to 2008.

== History ==
The International Horror Guild Award ran for 14 years starting in 1995 and was created to recognize the achievements of creators in the fields of horror and dark fantasy. Seen as supplementing other similar honors such as the Bram Stoker and World Fantasy Awards, the IHG Awards were run in their final years by editor Paula Guran. Finalists and winners were picked by juries of critics and reviewers, although initial recommendations were accepted from the general public. Judges for the awards included Edward Bryant, Ann VanderMeer, Stefan Dziemianowicz, William Sheehan, Fiona Webster and Hank Wagner. The annual awards were usually announced during a special presentation at a convention or other event, and IHG Award presentations have been held at the World Fantasy Convention, the World Horror Convention and Dragon*Con.

Originally in the form of a "winged dog gargoyle" figure on a base, in 2002 the IHG Award was redesigned as a black, tombstone-shaped and free-standing plaque. The Living Legend Award had the same design, but in clear acrylic.

== Presentations ==
| Award year | Presentation date | Event | City | Location | Living Legend honoree |
|---|---|---|---|---|---|
| 1994 | March 2–5, 1995 | World Horror Convention | Atlanta | Sheraton Colony Square | Harlan Ellison |
| 1995 | May 9–12, 1996 | World Horror Convention | Eugene | Valley River Inn | Clive Barker |
| 1996 | June 26-20, 1997 | Dragon*Con | Atlanta | Hyatt Regency Atlanta | Edward W. Bryant |
| 1997 | September 4, 1998 | Dragon*Con | Atlanta | Hyatt Regency Atlanta | Hugh B. Cave |
| 1998 | March 6, 1999 | World Horror Convention | Atlanta | North Central Marriott Hotel | Ray Bradbury |
| 1999 | May 12, 2000 | World Horror Convention | Denver | Adam's Mark Hotel | Richard Matheson |
| 2000 | September 1, 2001 | Dragon*Con | Atlanta | Hyatt Regency Ballroom | Alice Cooper |
| 2001 | April 13, 2002 | World Horror Convention | Chicago | Radisson O'Hare | William F. Nolan |
| 2002 | May 23, 2003 | Announced via press release | | | Charles L. Grant |
| 2003 | April 10, 2004 | World Horror Convention | Phoenix | Embassy Suites North Phoenix | Stephen King & E. F. Bleiler |
| 2004 | November 3, 2005 | World Fantasy Convention | Madison | Madison Concourse Hotel | Gahan Wilson |
| 2005 | November 2, 2006 | World Fantasy Convention | Austin | Renaissance Hotel | Chelsea Quinn Yarbro |
| 2006 | November 1, 2007 | World Fantasy Convention | Saratoga Springs | Saratoga Hotel | Ramsey Campbell |
| 2007 | October 31, 2008 | Announced via press release | | | Peter Straub |
