= Shadows (anthology) =

Series of horror anthologies

First edition, cover art by James Starrett

Shadows was a series of horror anthologies edited by Charles L. Grant, published by Doubleday from 1978 to 1991. Grant, a proponent of "quiet horror", initiated the series in order to offer readers a showcase of this kind of fiction. The short stories appearing in the Shadows largely dispensed with traditional Gothic settings, and had very little physical violence. Instead, they featured slow accumulations of dread through subtle omens, mostly taking place in everyday settings. While Grant himself was notable in this field of fiction, he contributed no stories to the anthologies, writing only the introductions and author profiles. The first volume in the series won the World Fantasy Award for Best Anthology.

== Anthology Contents ==
=== Shadows (first volume) ===
Published by Doubleday, 1978

- "Naples" Avram Davidson (Winner of the World Fantasy Award for Best Short Fiction)
- "The Little Voice" Ramsey Campbell
- "Butcher's Thumb" William Jon Watkins
- "Where All the Songs Are Sad" Thomas F. Monteleone
- "Splinters" R. A. Lafferty
- "Picture" Robert Bloch
- "The Nighthawk" Dennis Etchison
- "Dead Letters" Ramsey Campbell
- "A Certain Slant of Light" Raylyn Moore
- "Deathlove" Bill Pronzini
- "Mory" Michael Bishop
- "Where Spirits Gat Them Home" John Crowley
- "Nona" Stephen King

=== Shadows 2 ===
Published by Doubleday, November 1979

- "Saturday's Shadow" William F. Nolan
- "Night Visions" Jack Dann
- "The Spring" Manly Wade Wellman
- "Valentine" Janet Fox
- "Mackintosh Willie" Ramsey Campbell
- "Dragon Sunday" Ruth Berman
- "The White King's Dream" Elizabeth A. Lynn
- "The Chair" Alan Dean Foster and Jane Cozart
- "Clocks" Barry N. Malzberg and Bill Pronzini
- "Holly, Don't Tell" Juleen Brantingham
- "The Old Man's Will" Lee Wells
- "The Closing Off of Old Doors" Peter D. Pautz
- "Dead End" Richard Christian Matheson
- "Seasons of Belief" Michael Bishop
- "Petey" T. E. D. Klein

=== Shadows 3 ===
Published by Doubleday, November 1980

- "The Brown Recluse" Davis Grubb
- "To See You With, My Dear" Bruce Francis
- "Avenging Angel" Ray Russell
- "The Ghost Who Limped" R. Chetwynd-Hayes
- "Janey's Smile" Juleen Brantingham
- "Opening a Vein" Barry N. Malzberg & Bill Pronzini
- "The Partnership" William F. Nolan
- "Wish Hound" Pat Murphy
- "Ant" Peter D. Pautz
- "Tell Mommy What Happened" Alan Ryan
- "At the Bureau" Steve Rasnic Tem
- "Cabin 33" Chelsea Quinn Yarbro (Count Saint-Germain series)

=== Shadows 4 ===
Published by Doubleday, 1981

- "The Man Who Would Not Shake Hands" Stephen King
- "Yours, -Guy" Robert F. Young
- "The Belonging Kind" John Shirley and William Gibson
- "Calling Collect" Barry N. Malzberg and Arthur L. Samuels
- "Hearing is Believing" Ramsey Campbell
- "Threshold" Deirdre L. Kugelmeyer
- "A Visit to Brighton" Alan Ryan
- "Echoes from a Darkened Shore" Cherie Wilkerson
- "The Blue Chair" Tabitha King
- "Meow" Tanith Lee
- "The Giveaway" Steve Rasnic Tem
- "Need" Lisa Tuttle
- "Waiting for the Knight" Beverly Evans
- "Under My Bed" Al Sarrantonio
- "The Hour of Silhouette" Juleen Brantingham
- "Snow, Cobwebs, and Dust" John Keefauver
- "The Spider Glass" Chelsea Quinn Yarbro (Count Saint-Germain series)

=== Shadows 5 ===
Published by Doubleday, October 1982

- "The Gorgon" Tanith Lee
- "Stone Head" Steve Rasnic Tem
- "Pieta" Alan Ryan
- "Boxes" Al Sarrantonio
- "And I'll Be with You By and By" Avon Swofford
- "Dark Wings" Phyllis Eisenstein
- "Estrella" Terry L. Parkinson
- "Singles" Marta Randall
- "The Piano Man" Beverly Evans
- "Following the Way" Alan Ryan
- "Renewal" Chelsea Quinn Yarbro (Count Saint-Germain series)

=== Shadows 6 ===
Published by Doubleday, October 1983

- "We Share" Lori Negridge Allen
- "The Appearances of Giorgio" Leslie Alan Horvitz
- "The Touch" Wayne Wightman
- "Sneakers" Marc Laidlaw
- "Reunion" Jack Dann
- "By the Hair of the Head" Joe R. Lansdale
- "Dreams" Elisabeth Erica Burden
- "Crutches" Steve Rasnic Tem
- "Eenie, Meenie, Ipsateenie" Pat Cadigan
- "Cold Heart" Peter D. Pautz
- "Peppermint Kisses" Jesse Osburn
- "A Last Testament For Nick and the Trooper" J. Michael Straczynski
- "Marianna" Melissa Mia Hall
- "The Man With Legs" Al Sarrantonio
- "The Silent Cradle" Leigh Kennedy
- "But At My Back I Always Hear" David Morrell

=== Shadows 7 ===
Published by Doubleday, November 1984

- "Mrs Clendon's Place" Joseph Payne Brennan
- "Stillwater, 1896" Michael Cassutt
- "The Haunting" Susan Casper
- "Daddy" Earl Godwin
- "Seeing the World" Ramsey Campbell
- "Three Days" Tanith Lee
- "Still Frame" Jack C. Haldeman II
- "Talking in the Dark" Dennis Etchison
- "A Matter of Taste" Parke Godwin
- "Do Not Forsake Me, O My Darlin'" Chelsea Quinn Yarbro
- "Decoys" Jere Cunningham
- "Rapture" Melissa Mia Hall
- "The Storm" David Morrell
- "I Shall Not Leave England Now" Alan Ryan

=== Shadows 8 ===
Published by Doubleday, October 1985

- "The Shadow of the Hawk" Nina Kiriki Hoffman
- "Do I Dare to Eat a Peach" Chelsea Quinn Yarbro
- "The Blind Man" Jessica Amanda Salmonson
- "A Demon in Rosewood" Sharon Webb
- "Blood Gothic" Nancy Holder
- "The Pooka" Peter Tremayne
- "Everything's Going to Be All Right" Gene DeWeese
- "Cycles" Kim Antieau
- "The Tuckahoe" Nancy Etchemendy
- "Between the Windows of the Sea" Jack Dann
- "The Battering" Steve Rasnic Tem
- "Toy" Bill Pronzini
- "The Man Who Loved Water" Craig Shaw Gardner
- "Sand" Alan Ryan
- "The Blue Man" Terry L. Parkinson
- "Wish" Al Sarrantonio
- "A Night At the Head of the Grave" Thomas Sullivan

=== Shadows 9 ===
Published by Doubleday, October 1986

- "The Jigsaw Girl" Stephen Gallagher
- "The Lesson" Christopher Browne
- "On the Turn" Leanne Frahm
- "Moving Night" Nancy Holder
- "Sanctuary" Kim Antieau
- "Now You See Me" Sheri Lee Morton
- "The Fishing Village of Roebush" Leslie Alan Horvitz
- "Icarus" Galad Elflandsson
- "Ants" Nina Kiriki Hoffman
- "Nor Disreguard the Humblest Voice" Ardath Mayhar
- "The Skins You Love to Touch" Janet Fox
- "Walk Home Alone" Craig Shaw Gardner
- "The Father Figure" Terry L. Parkinson
- "An Ordinary Brick House" Joseph Payne Brennan
- "Overnight" Lou Fisher
- "The Last Time I Saw Harris" Galad Elflandsson
- "Tavesher" Peter Tremayne
- "Bloodwolf" Steve Rasnic Tem

=== Shadows 10 ===
Published by Doubleday, October 1987

- "Jamie's Grave" Lisa Tuttle
- "Apples" Nina Downey Higgins
- "A World Without Toys" T. M. Wright
- "Law of Averages" Wendy Webb
- "The Fence" Thomas Sullivan
- "Moonflower" Melissa Mia Hall
- "Come Where My Love Lies Dreaming" Bob Leman
- "The Finder-Keeper" Ken Wisman
- "Just a Little Souvenir" Cheryl Fuller Nelson
- "Like Shadows in the Dark" Stephen Gallagher
- "Office Hours" Douglas E. Winter
- "We Have Always Lived in the Forest" Nancy Holder
- "Just Like Their Masters" Mona A. Clee
- "Pigs" Al Sarrantonio

=== Final Shadows ===
Published by Doubleday, September 1991

- "The Boarder" Wendy Webb
- "Magpie" Stephen Gallagher
- "Fastening" Julie R. Good
- "Past Tense" Brian Hodge
- "Under the Boardwalk" Lori Negridge Allen
- "The Picnickers" Brian Lumley
- "Fry Day" Melanie Tem
- "Out Behind the Shed" Bill Pronzini
- "Fear a' Ghorta" Peter Tremayne
- "The Sweetest Rain" Nancy Holder
- "Wrong Side of the Road" Norman Partridge
- "Island of the Seals" Samantha Lee
- "Thirteen Lies About Hummingbirds" Michael Bishop
- "The Stone Face" Colin Greenland
- "Medusa's Child" Kim Antieau
- "The Tape" Jessica Palmer
- "The Dark Places In Between" Karen Haber
- "I'll See You On Saturday Night" Guy N. Smith
- "Beijing Craps" Graham Masterton
- "Sarnain" Bernard Taylor
- "The Mermaid" Tanith Lee
- "Rescheduled" Mike Chinn
- "Going Away" Craig Shaw Gardner
- "A Father's Dream" Chet Williamson
- "The Magic House" Lynn S. Hightower
- "When They Gave Us Memory" Dennis Etchison
- "A Sailor's Pay" Jack Cady
- "Something About Camilla" Juleen Brantingham
- "Parallax" Nicholas Royle
- "The Door" Sharon Webb
- "Photo-Call" David Sutton
- "Against the Skin" Mark Morris
- "Of Natural Causes" Ashley McConnell
- "Mulberry's Crystal" Brian Mooney & Stephen Jones
- "Together" David S. Garnett
- "The Beautiful Uncut Hair of Graves" David Morrell
