= Lonely Road Books =

American publishing company

- Company type: Publishing
- Industry: Books, publishing
- Founded: 2007
- Founder: Brian James Freeman and Richard Chizmar
- Headquarters: Forest Hill, Maryland, US
- Products: Books, chapbooks
- Website: www.lonelyroadbooks.com/%20www.lonelyroadbooks.com

Lonely Road Books is a small press publishing company founded in 2007 by Brian James Freeman and Richard Chizmar and based out of Forest Hill, Maryland. They are a publishing company that specializes in deluxe signed limited edition books. Lonely Road Books has released the anthology Dark Forces: The 25th Anniversary Special Edition edited by Kirby McCauley, and they have released and are releasing books by notable writers Stephen King, Ray Garton (writing as Arthur Darknell), Douglas Clegg, Stewart O'Nan, Mick Garris, and more.

== Edition types ==
Lonely Road Books have released their books mostly in two limited states (Limited Editions and Lettered Editions), but they have also release Gift Editions and Chapbooks.

=== Limited editions ===
Lonely Road Books' "Limited Editions" are hardcovers that tend to come signed by the authors, editors, and the artists involved in the publication on a specially illustrated signature page. They also are usually bound in a deluxe material (imported leather, Japanese silk, etc.). They often contain a frontispiece that is created specifically for that edition. Plus, they are usually housed in a custom-made slipcase. They are limited from 200 to 500 copies.

=== Lettered editions ===
Lonely Road Books' "Lettered Editions" are hardcovers that usually come with the same bonus features as their "Limited Editions," but they are bound in a different high quality material, feature extra or different art, and they are housed in a custom-made deluxe traycase. They are usually limited to 26 to 52 copies.

=== Collector's gift editions ===
Lonely Road Books' "Collector's Gift Editions" are hardcovers that usually come bound in a deluxe material and housed in a special slipcase. They are not usually signed. So far, only Riding the Bullet: The Deluxe Special Edition Double by Stephen King and Mick Garris has been released in this format. It was limited to 3000 copies.

=== Chapbooks ===
Lonely Road Books' "Chapbooks" tend to be an illustrated short story bound as a paperback chapbook. Keith Minnion has designed and illustrated all of the chapbooks that Lonely Road Books has released so far. The Most Interesting Prospect by Ray Garton (writing as Arthur Darknell) was limited to 26 copies. Monsters by Stewart O'Nan was limited to 226 copies (one for each Limited and Lettered Edition produced).

== Releases ==
- Dark Forces: The 25th Anniversary Edition edited by Kirby McCauley (2007)

Features the same stories as the original release (like The Mist by Stephen King), but it also includes signatures from the editor and all of the artists, a new interview of Kirby McCauley conducted by Kealan Patrick Burke, a new cover by Bernie Wrightson, and over twenty-four new color and black and white inner illustrations by Jill Bauman, Glenn Chadbourne, Alan M. Clark, Allen Koszowski, Alex McVey, Keith Minnion, Chad Savage, and Erik Wilson. It was available in two editions:

- Limited Edition of 300 copies
- Lettered Edition of 26 copies

- The Arthur Darknell Double by Ray Garton (writing under the pseudonym Arthur Darknell) (2008)

Released as an oversized slipcased hardcover that is bound in the flip book / tête-bêche format (like an Ace Double). It includes two complete novels: Loveless and Murder Was My Alibi. It features artwork by Vincent Chong, Keith Minnion and Alex McVey. It was available in two editions:

- Limited Edition of 200 copies
- Lettered Edition of 26 copies (with a bonus chapbook "The Most Interesting Prospect" which was also limited to just 26 signed and lettered copies.)

- Poe by Stewart O'Nan (2008)

Features a foreword by Roger Corman and frontispiece by Jill Bauman. All copies came with a bonus chapbook containing the story Monsters. Poe was available in two editions:

- Limited Edition of 200 copies
- Lettered Edition of 26 copies

- Riding the Bullet: The Deluxe Special Edition Double by Stephen King and Mick Garris (2010)

Released as an oversized slipcased hardcover that is bound in the flip book / tête-bêche format (like an Ace Double). It features the novella Riding the Bullet by Stephen King, the original script for the film with same name by Mick Garris, and artwork by Alan M. Clark and Bernie Wrightson. Lonely Road Book Available in three editions:

- Collector's Gift Edition: limited to just 3000 slipcased copies (not signed)
- Limited Edition of 500 copies (signed by Mick Garris and the artist)
- Lettered Edition of 52 copies (signed by Stephen King)

- Blockade Billy by Stephen King (2011)

All Lonely Road Books editions come with a signed Stephen King baseball card, the William "Blocakde Billy" Blakely baseball card that came with the Cemetery Dance Publications trade edition, extra artwork from Glen Orbik and Alex McVey, an illustrated signature sheet signed by the two artists, and two color printing throughout the book. Available in two editions:

- Limited Edition of 350 copies (comes in a custom deluxe traycase with pullout ribbon)
- Lettered Edition of 52 copies (comes with an original piece of artwork, a bonus art portfolio of Limited Edition prints, and a deluxe hand-made custom box)

- The Vampyricon Trilogy: The Definitive Special Edition by Douglas Clegg (forthcoming( Looks to be finally released 8 years after original solicitation and payment, March 27, 2009.))

Contains all three of the Vampyricon novels: The Priest of Blood, The Lady of Serpents, and The Queen of Wolves. All have been re-edited to the author's liking. Plus, an addendum of around 50 to 100 pages of exclusive "deleted scenes" and "lost material" is also included. Also includes color and black & white artwork by Erin Wells. Available in two editions:

- Limited Edition of 250 copies
- Lettered Edition of 26 copies
