= Al Sarrantonio =

American novelist (1952–2025)

- Born: May 25, 1952; New York City, U.S.
- Died: January 27, 2025 (aged 72); Newburgh, U.S.
- Education: Manhattan College (BA)
- Occupations: Writer; editor; publisher
- Writing career
- Period: 1968–2025
- Genres: Horror fiction, fantasy, science fiction, mysteries, Westerns
- Website: www.alsarranton.io

Al Sarrantonio (May 25, 1952 – January 27, 2025) was an American horror and science fiction writer, editor, and publisher who authored more than 50 books and 90 short stories. He also edited numerous anthologies.

== Background and education ==
Sarrantonio was born in New York City on May 25, 1952, and grew up on Long Island. He was of Italian and Scots-Irish descent. He began his career at the age of 16 with a nonfiction appearance in one of editor Ray Palmer's publications. He continued to write throughout university, and in 1974, after graduation from Manhattan College with a B.A. in English, he attended the Clarion Science Fiction Writers Workshop at Michigan State University.

Sarrantonio died on January 27, 2025, at the age of 72.

== Career ==
In 1976 Sarrantonio began an editing career at a major New York publishing house. His first short fiction, "Ahead of the Joneses," appeared in Isaac Asimov's Science Fiction Magazine in 1979, followed by a story in Heavy Metal magazine the following year. In 1980 he published 14 short stories. In 1982, after leaving publishing to become a full-time writer, he began his first novel, The Worms, followed by Campbell Wood, Totentanz and The Boy with Penny Eyes. He established himself in the horror field with such much-anthologized stories as "Pumpkin Head", "The Man With Legs", "Father Dear," "Wish", and "Richard's Head," (all of which appear in his first short story collection, Toybox). "Richard's Head" brought him his first Bram Stoker Award nomination.

Sarrantonio was writing a horror saga revolving around Halloween, which takes place in the fictional upstate New York town of Orangefield (novels: Halloweenland, Hallows Eve and Horrorween, the last of which incorporates three shorter Orangefield pieces: the short novel Orangefield, and novelettes Hornets and The Pumpkin Boy). Other horror novels include Moonbane, October, House Haunted and Skeletons. He has also written Westerns (West Texas and Kitt Peak), mysteries (Cold Night and Summer Cool) and science fiction (the Edgar Rice Burroughs-influenced trilogy Haydn of Mars, Sebastian of Mars and Queen of Mars, omnibused as Masters of Mars by the Science Fiction Book Club, 2006).

Sarrantonio was book reviewer for Night Cry magazine, the short-lived digest-sized offshoot of the Twilight Zone Magazine, and had been a critic and columnist for other publications.

=== Select awards and honors ===
Work	Year & Award	Category	Result	Ref.
Richard's Head	1991 Bram Stoker Award	Short Fiction	Nominated	
999: New Stories of Horror and Suspense	1999 Bram Stoker Award	Anthology	Won	
999: New Stories of Horror and Suspense	2000 World Fantasy Award	Anthology	Nominated	
999: New Stories of Horror and Suspense	2000 British Fantasy Award	Anthology	Nominated	
999: New Stories of Horror and Suspense	2000 Locus Award	Anthology	Nominated	
Toybox	2000 International Horror Guild Award	Collection	Nominated	
Redshift: Extreme Visions of Speculative Fiction	2002 Locus Award	Anthology	Nominated	
	2002 Locus Award	Best Editor	Nominated	
Flights: Extreme Visions of Fantasy	2005 Locus Award	Anthology	Nominated	
Stories: All-New Tales (with Neil Gaiman)	2010 Shirley Jackson Award	Anthology	Won	
Stories: All-New Tales (with Neil Gaiman)	2011 Audie Awards	Short Stories or Collections	Won	
Stories: All-New Tales (with Neil Gaiman)	2011 World Fantasy Award	Anthology	Nominated	
Stories: All-New Tales (with Neil Gaiman)	2013 FantLab's Book of the Year Award	Anthology	Nominated	

== Select bibliography ==
=== Novels ===
- Underground (Crossroad Press, 2013, e-book)
- Sisters in Mystery (Crossroad Press, 2012, e-book)
- Summer Cool (Walker, 1993; Crossroad Press, 2011, e-book)
- Kitt Peak (Evans, 1993; Leisure, 2006; Crossroad Press, 2011, e-book)
- Skeletons (novel) Skeletons (Bantam, 1992; Crossroad Press, 2011, e-book)
- House Haunted (Bantam, 1991; Crossroad Press, 2011, e-book)
- West Texas (Evans, 1990; Leisure, 2006; Crossroad Press, 2011, e-book)
- October (Bantam, 1990; Crossroad Press, 2011, e-book)
- Moonbane (Bantam, 1989, paperback; Cemetery Dance, 2009; Crossroad Press, 2011, e-book)
- Cold Night (TOR, 1989; Crossroad Press, 2011, e-book)
- The Boy with Penny Eyes (TOR, 1987; Crossroad Press, 2011, e-book)
- Totentanz (TOR, 1985; Crossroad Press, 2011, e-book)
- Campbell Wood (Doubleday, 1986; Berkley, 1987; Crossroad Press, 2011, e-book)
- The Worms (Doubleday, 1985; Berkley, 1988; Crossroad Press, 2011, e-book)

=== The Orangefield Cycle ===
- "Orange Lake" (novelette), Impossible Monsters, edited by Kasey Lansdale (Subterranean Press, 2013; Crossroad Press, e-book, 2015)
- "All Souls Day" (Mark Sieber's Horror Drive-In exclusive Orangefield short story featuring original art by Keith Minnion) (October 2009)
- Halloweenland (Leisure Books Mass Market Paperback 2007; Cemetery Dance limited edition hardcover, 2009; Crossroad Press e-book, 2012) - A novel length book that includes elements of The Baby and much more new material (the Leisure paperback also includes the original version of The Baby as a bonus).
- Horrorween (Leisure, 2006; Crossroad Press e-book, 2012) - A retelling of "Hornets," The Pumpkin Boy, and Orangefield.
- The Baby (Cemetery Dance Publications, 2006) - A limited edition novelette
- The Pumpkin Boy (Endeavor, 2005) - A limited edition novelette
- Hallows Eve (Leisure, 2004; Cemetery Dance Publications, 2006; Crossroad Press e-book, 2012)
- Orangefield (Cemetery Dance, 2002)
- "Hornets" (a short work that first appeared in Trick or Treat: A Collection of Halloween Novellas edited by Richard Chizmar) (Cemetery Dance, 2001)

=== The "Five Worlds" science fiction trilogy ===
- Return (ROC, 1997; Crossroad Press, 2012, e-book)
- Journey (ROC, 1997; Crossroad Press, 2012, e-book)
- Exile (ROC, 1996; Crossroad Press, 2012, e-book)

=== The "Masters of Mars" science fiction trilogy ===
- Masters of Mars (Science Fiction Book Club collection of all three titles in one hardcover, 2006; Crossroad Press, 2011, e-book)
- Queen of Mars (Ace, 2006; Crossroad Press, 2011, e-book)
- Sebastian of Mars (Ace, 2005; Crossroad Press, 2011, e-book)
- Haydn of Mars (Ace, 2005; Crossroad Press, 2011, e-book)

=== Babylon 5 series ===
- Babylon 5: Personal Agendas (Dell, 1997)

=== Short story collections ===
- Halloween and Other Seasons (Cemetery Dance, 2008; Crossroad Press, 2011, e-book). Includes:

"Summer"
"Sleepover"
"Eels"
"Letters From Camp"
"Roger in the Womb"
"The Return of Mad Santa"
"Baby Boss and the Underground Hamsters"
"Trail of the Chromium Bandits"
"The Man in the Other Car"
"Hedges"
"The Silly Stuff"
"The New Kid"
"Ahead of the Jonses"
"The Artist in the Small Room Above"
"The Dancing Foot"
"Liberty"
"Dust"
"The Pumpkin Boy"

- Hornets and Others (Cemetery Dance, 2005; Crossroad Press, 2011, e-book). Includes:

"The Ropy Thing"
"The Only"
"The Beat"
"In the Corn"
"Two"
"The Coat"
"The Haunting of Y-12"
"Billy the Fetus"
"Stars"
"Bags"
"The Red Wind"
"The Green Face"
"White Lightning"
"The Glass Man"
"Violets"
"The Quiet Ones"
"Hornets"

- A Little Yellow Book of Fevered Stories (Borderlands Press, 2004). Includes:

"Preface"
"Father Dear"
"The Ropy Thing"
"The Electric Fat Boy"
"Sleepover"
"In the Corn"
"Stars"
"The New Kid"
"Pumpkin Head"

- Toybox (Cemetery Dance, 1999; Leisure, 2003; Crossroad Press, 2011, e-book). Includes:

"Pumpkin Head"
"The Man With Legs"
"The Spook Man"
"Wish"
"Under My Bed"
"The Big House"
"Bogy"
"The Corn Dolly"
"The Electric Fat Boy"
"Snow"
"Garden of Eden"
"The Dust"
"Father Dear"
"Children of Cain"
"Red Eve"
"Pigs"
"Richard's Head"
"Boxes"

=== Anthologies containing stories by Sarrantonio ===
- Chrysalis 7, edited by Roy Torgeson (Doubleday, 1981). Contains the short story, "The Artist in the Small Room Above"
- Chrysalis 9, edited by Roy Torgeson (Doubleday, 1981). Contains the short story, "That They Be Saved"
- Shadows 4 edited By Charles L. Grant. (Doubleday Science Fiction 1981). Includes the short story, "Under My Bed"
- Shadows 5 edited By Charles L. Grant. (Doubleday Science Fiction 1982). Includes the short story, "Boxes"
- Shadows 6 edited By Charles L. Grant. (Doubleday Science Fiction 1983). Includes the short story, "The Man With Legs"
- Weirdbook 18, published by W. Paul Ganley, 1983. Includes the short story "The Quiet Ones"
- Shadows 8 edited By Charles L. Grant. (Doubleday Science Fiction 1985). Includes the short story, "Wish"
- Shadows 10 edited By Charles L. Grant. (Doubleday Science Fiction 1987). Includes the short story, "Pigs"
- Weirdbook 23/24, (Double issue) published by W. Paul Ganley, 1988. Includes the short story, "The Red Wind"
- Stalkers, edited by Ed Gorman and Martin H. Greenberg. (Dark Harvest Books 1989). Includes the short story, "Children of Cain"
- Razored Saddles edited by Joe R. Lansdale and Pat LoBrutto. (Dark Harvest, 1989). Includes the short story, "Trail of the Chromium Bandits"
- Under the Fang, edited by Robert R. McCammon (Pocket Books, Aug. 1991). Includes the short story "Red Eve"
- Bruce Coville's Book of Spine Tinglers: Tales to Make You Shiver, edited by Bruce Coville (Apple Paperbacks 1996). Includes the short story, "Letters From Camp"
- The Mammoth Book of Comic Fantasy, edited by Mike Ashley. (Carroll & Graf Pub 1998). Includes the short story, "The Return of Mad Santa"
- Trick or Treat: A Collection of Halloween Novellas edited by Richard Chizmar. (Cemetery Dance 2001). Includes the short story "Hornets"
- Shivers, edited by Richard Chizmar. (Cemetery Dance 2002). Includes the short story, "The Green Face"
- The Ultimate Halloween, edited by Marvin Kaye. (I Books 2003). Includes the short story, "Pumpkin Head"
- Shivers II, edited by Richard Chizmar (Cemetery Dance 2003). Includes the short story, "The New Kid"
- Shivers III, edited by Richard Chizmar (Cemetery Dance 2004). Includes the short story, "Hedges"
- Quietly Now (a tribute to Charles L. Grant), edited by Kealan Patrick Burke (Borderlands 2004). Includes the short story, "Dust"
- Retro-Pulp Tales, edited by Joe R. Lansdale (Subterranean Press, 2006). Includes the short story, "Summer"
- Shivers IV, edited by Richard Chizmar (Cemetery Dance 2006). Includes the short story, "The Man in the Other Car"
- Midnight Premiere, edited by Tom Piccirilli (Cemetery Dance Publications 2007). Includes the short story, "Baby Boss and the Underground Hamsters"
- Shivers V, edited by Richard Chizmar (Cemetery Dance 2009). Includes the short story "Cookies"
- Cemetery Dance: a Fifteen Year Celebration, edited by Richard Chizmar. (Cemetery Dance Publications, 2010). May include the short story, "Landing Earl"
- Shivers VI, edited by Richard Chizmar (Cemetery Dance 2010). Includes the short story "Last"
- Impossible Monsters, edited by Kasey Lansdale (Subterranean Press, 2013). Includes the Orangefield novelette "Orange Lake"

=== Books edited by Sarrantonio ===
- Portents - signed original anthology published in 2011.
- Stories - co-edited with Neil Gaiman. Published June 2010.
- Halloween: New Poems (anthology of original poems by Al Sarrantonio, James A. Moore, T. M. Wright, Joe R. Lansdale, Brian Freeman, Gary A. Braunbeck, and more) (May 2010, Cemetery Dance) ISBN 978-1-58767-205-7
- Flights: Extreme Visions of Fantasy (ROC, 2004). Includes his short story "Sleepover."
- Redshift: Extreme Visions of Speculative Fiction (ROC, 2001)
- 999: New Stories of Horror and Suspense (Avon, 1999; Perennial, 2001)
- 100 Hair-Raising Little Horror Stories (with Martin H. Greenberg, Barnes & Noble, 1993)
- The National Lampoon Treasury of Humor (Fireside/Simon & Schuster, 1991)
- The Fireside Treasury of New Humor (Fireside/Simon & Schuster, 1989)
- The Fireside Treasury of Great Humor (Fireside/Simon & Schuster, 1987)

=== Magazine appearances ===
- Cemetery Dance, #46. Features the short story "Eels."
- Cemetery Dance, #35, 2001. Features the short story "Violets."
- Cemetery Dance, #22 Winter 1995 (Volume Six, Issue Four). Features the short story "Garden of Eden."
- Cemetery Dance, #4 Spring 1990 (Volume 2 issue 2). Features the short story "The Meek."
- Spiderwebs, Volume 1, Number 2; Spring 1982. Contains the short story "Sherlocks."
- Fantasy Book, #3; February 1982. Contains the short story "The Return of Mad Santa."
- Analog Science Fiction and Fact Volume 101 #13; December 1981. Features the short story "There is a Home."
- Heavy Metal May 1979. Features the short story "Roger in the Womb."
- Isaac Asimov's Science Fiction Magazine Volume 3 #3; March 1979. Features the short story "Ahead of the Joneses."

=== Comic book adaptations ===
- Cemetery Dance Presents: Grave Tales issue #2 (May 2000). Features "The Corn Dolly" adapted by Glenn Chadbourne.
- Weird Business edited by Joe R. Lansdale and Richard Klaw (1995). Features "The Man with Legs."
