= Janet Fox (author) =

American poet

- Born: October 25, 1940; Topeka, Kansas
- Died: October 21, 2009 (aged 68); Osage City, Kansas
- Occupations: Author; editor; publisher

Janet Kaye Fox (October 25, 1940 – October 21, 2009) was an American fantasy and horror writer, poet, teacher, and founder-editor-publisher of the now-defunct Scavenger's Newsletter. She lived in Osage City, Kansas.

== Career ==
Fox spent fifteen years as a teacher of English and foreign language at Osage City High School, and a number of years after as an instructor for Writer's Digest School. She served as secretary/treasurer of the Small Press Writers and Artists' Organization, as well as issuing a newsletter for the group, afterwards establishing Scavenger's Newsletter, a monthly market letter for "SF/Fantasy/Horror/Mystery writers and artists with an interest in the small press" published from 1984 to 2003. Scavenger's Newsletter also published short fiction, poems, essays, reviews, interviews and interior illustrations from writers like Marge Simon, Bruce Boston, Jeff VanderMeer, Lela E. Buis and others.

Fox's writing career began in 1970, with her work appearing in professional and small press publications. Most of Fox's book length fiction was written as Alex McDonough, the shared pseudonym under which Ace Books's six-volume "Scorpio" series was issued in the early 1990s. She wrote all but the first volume. She also wrote, under her own name, a wide variety of short fiction and poetry, some collected in A Witch's Dozen (2003) and Not in Kansas (2004).

Her short fiction appeared in Borderland, Cemetery Dance, Collage, Crossroads, Dark Regions, Dead of Night, Eldritch Tales, Eternity, Fantastic, Fantasy Book, Grue, The Horror Show, Infinitum, Marion Zimmer Bradley's Fantasy Magazine, Metamorphoses, New Blood, Shadow Sword, Sorcerer's Apprentice, Tales as Like as Not, Tales of the Unanticipated, Twilight Zone, 2AM FII, The Urbanite, Weirdbook, Whispers, and such anthologies as All the Devils Are Here (David D. Deyo, Jr., ed., 1986), Amazons! (Jessica Amanda Salmonson, ed., 1979), Best of the Horror Show (David B. Silva, ed., 1987), Burning With a Vision (Robert Frazier, ed., 1984), The Definitive Best of the Horror Show (David B. Silva, ed., 1992), Dragon Tales (Isaac Asimov, et al., eds., 1982), Fantasy Tales #6 (Stephen Jones, et al., eds., 1991), Fears (Charles L. Grant, ed., 1983), The Giant Book of Fantasy Tales (Stephen Jones, et al., eds., 1996), Horrorstory Volume Three (Karl Edward Wagner, ed., 1992), Midnight (Charles L. Grant, ed., 1985), 100 Fiendish Little Frightmares (Stefan Dziemianowicz, et al., eds., 1997), 100 Great Fantasy Short Short Stories (Isaac Asimov, et al., ed., 1984), 100 Twisted Little Tales of Torment (Stefan Dziemianowicz, et al., eds., 1998), 100 Wicked Little Witch Stories (Stefan Dziemianowicz, et al., eds., 1995), Post Mortem: New Tales of Ghastly Horror (Paul F. Olson, et al., eds., 1989), Shadows #2 (Charles L. Grant, ed., 1979), Shadows #9 (Charles L. Grant, ed., 1986), Sword and Sorceress #1 (Marion Zimmer Bradley, ed., 1984), Sword and Sorceress #5 (Marion Zimmer Bradley, ed., 1988), Tales by Moonlight II (Jessica Amanda Salmonson, ed., 1989), Voices from the Night (John Maclay, ed., 1994), When the Black Lotus Blooms (Elizabeth A. Saunders, ed., 1990), The Year's Best Fantasy Stories #5 (Lin Carter, ed., 1980), The Year's Best Horror Stories: Series VI (Gerald W. Page, ed., 1978), and The Year's Best Horror Stories: Series VII (Gerald W. Page, ed., 1979).

Her poetry appeared in Critical Mass, Dreams & Nightmares, Eldritch Tales, Joseph Payne Brennan's Essence, Fungi FII, Grue, Nøctulpa, Nyctalops, Owlflight, Paradox, The Tome, 2AM, Star*Line, Weird Tales, and such anthologies as Aliens & Lovers (Millea Kenin, ed., 1983), Burning with a Vision (Robert Frazier, ed., 1984), and Once Upon a Midnight (Jame A. Riley et al., eds., 1995).

== Bibliography ==
=== Scorpio series ===
- Scorpio (as Alex McDonough) (1990)
- Scorpio Rising (as Alex McDonough) (1990)
- Scorpio Descending (as Alex McDonough) (1991)
- Dragon's Blood (as Alex McDonough) (1991)
- Dragon's Eye (as Alex McDonough) (1992)
- Dragon's Claw (as Alex McDonough) (1993)

=== Collections ===
- A Witch's Dozen (2003)

=== Short stories ===
- "Materialist" (1970)
- "Say It with Spiders" (1970)
- "The Miraculous God Machine" (1971)
- "The Lord Loved Little People" (1972)
- "A Witch in Time" (1973)
- "She-Bear" (1974)
- "Screaming to Get Out" (1977)
- "Intimately, With Rain" (1978)
- "Demon and Demoiselle" (1978)
- "Valentine" (1979)
- "Morrien's Bitch" (1979)
- "Answer Came There None" (1980)
- "How Jaquerel Fell Prey to Ankarrah" (1980)
- "The Name Unspeakable in Tel Urath" (1980)
- "Garage Sale" (1982)
- "How Jaquerel Learned to Let Sleeping Gods Lie" (1982)
- "Small Magic" (1982)
- "Witches" (1983)
- "Surrogate" (1983)
- "In the Kingdom of the Thorn" (1983)
- "Clown Black" (1984)
- "Gate of the Damned" (1984)
- "The Ghost-Winder" (1984)
- "Immortality and Mrs. Mundy" (1984)
- "Christobel" (1985)
- "Taking Care of Bertie" (1985)
- "To a Crow, All Crows are White" (1985)
- "Cille's World" (1986)
- "Cradle Robbers" (1986)
- "The Skins You Love to Touch" (1986)
- "The Umbrella" (1986)
- "Mirror Trick" (1987)
- "Strands" (1987)
- "When Jaquerel Walked with Shadows" (1987)
- "Eyes of the Laemi" (1988)
- "Heirloom" (1988)
- "Getting Miss Grisley" (1988)
- "The Man Who Loved the Wizard's Son" (1988)
- "Dream Journey" (1989)
- "The Servitor" (1989)
- "Late Bloomer" (1990)
- "The Saturday Morning Horrors" (1990)
- "The Unicorn Girl" (1990)
- "The Dragon Business" (with Kevin J. Anderson) (1991)
- "How Jaquerel Made War in Bel Azhurra" (1991)
- "The Kirkhall Legacy" (1992)
- "The Bloodfruit" (1993)
- "Hey Mom" (1994)
- "The Bug Boy" (1995)

=== Poems ===
- "O Slapstick Buddha" (1978)
- "Quotella" (1981)
- "Institutions" (1982)
- "Two Poems" (1982)
- "In the First Month of Becoming" (1983)
- "Death" (1983)
- "As the Wind Improvised" (1984)
- "Insomniac" (1985)
- "Cthulhu of the Webbed Cross" (1986)
- "Haiku" (1986)
- "To Love the Dark" (1986)
- "Untitled" (1986)
- "Hard Knight's Work" (1988)
- "Like an old wizard..." (1988)
- "Nocturnal ... Elisions" (1988)
- "Some Kind of Monster" (1988)
- "That Maniac Upstairs" (1988)
- "The Time Barrier" (1988)
- "Telepathy" (1988)
- "When We Lived in the Cemetery" (1988)
- "Willow Woman Walks" (1988)
- "All the Black Crayons" (1989)
- "Ledger" (1990)
- "Under Jennie's Bed" (1990)
- "Untitled" (“Fading in and out of intermittent...”) (1990)
- “"Untitled ("Neon in vomet green...”) (1990)
- "(____)" (1991)
- "Bag Lady's Ghost" (1995)
- "Time as a Closet" (1995)

=== Articles ===
- "Janet Fox" (1982)
- "Other Side of the Desk" (1987)
- "Overview of Horror, SF and Fantasy: A Long-range Market Study" (1987)
