= Jill Bauman =

American artist

- Born: New York City, U.S.
- Education: Adelphi University, Queens College, Art Students League of NY
- Known for: Artist, Illustrator, Designer, Poet, Art agent for Walter Velez

Jill Bauman is an American artist. She has been nominated for the World Fantasy Award five times and nominated for the Chesley Award several times. Her art has been exhibited at the Delaware Art Museum, the Moore College of Art, Art Students League of New York, the NY Illustrators Society & and the Science Fiction Museum of Seattle. Bauman has created hundreds of book covers for horror, mystery, fantasy, science fiction, and best selling books including 23 of the Cat Who... books by Lilian Jackson Braun during the 1980s and 1990s.

Jill Bauman got her Bachelor of Arts from Adelphi University. She did her graduate work at Adelphi University and Queens College. She is a Life Member of the Art Students League of New York.

She was born in Brooklyn, New York, and she lives in Queens, New York and has two grown daughters.

== Authors and magazines ==
Jill Bauman has illustrated the written works of many authors of horror, mystery, fantasy, science fiction, and speculative fiction, including J. G. Ballard, Clive Barker, Gregory Benford, Lilian Jackson Braun, David Brin, Orson Scott Card, John Crowley, Jack Dann, Harlan Ellison, Paul Di Filippo, Ray Garton, Jonathan Gash, Brian Keene, Stephen King, Dean Koontz, Nancy Kress, Katherine Kurtz, Richard Laymon, Fritz Leiber, H. P. Lovecraft, Anne McCaffrey, Robert R. McCammon, Mike Resnick, Pamela Sargent, Dan Simmons, Peter Straub, Michael Swanwick, Chet Williamson, Jack Williamson, and Gene Wolfe.

She has done artwork for many magazines, including:

- Amazing Stories
- Cemetery Dance Magazine
- Fantasy & Science Fiction Magazine (she is included in their top 10 most used cover illustrators)
- Flesh & Blood Magazine
- Future Magazine
- Horror Express
- Inhuman Magazine
- Space & Time Magazine
- Starlog Magazine
- Weird Tales

== Notable works ==
=== Covers ===
- A Quiet Night of Fear by Charles L. Grant (Berkley Books, 1980)
- Other Stories and... The Attack of the Giant Baby by Kit Reed (Berkley Books, 1981)
- A Glow of Candles by Charles L. Grant (Berkley Books, 1981)
- Carlisle Street by T. M. Wright (Tor Books, 1982).
- The Practice Effect by David Brin (Doubleday Book Club, 1984)
- The Doll Who Ate His Mother by Ramsey Campbell (Tor Books, 1984)
- Melancholy Elephants by Spider Robinson (Tor Books, 1984)
- Cat Who… series of books by Lilian Jackson Braun. 23 covers from 1985 to 1996
- Song of Kali by Dan Simmons (Hardcover/Bluejay Books, Paperback/Tor Books, 1985)
- A Stainless Steel Rat is Born by Harry Harrison (Doubleday SF Book Club, 1985)
- Nightshow by Richard Laymon (Tor Books, 1985)
- The Judas Rose by Suzette Haden Elgin (DAW Books, 1986)
- The Long Night of the Grave by Charles L. Grant (Don Grant Books)
- The Lost Heir (Sherlock Holmes Solo Mystery number 8) by Gerald Lientz (Iron Crown Publishing, 1988)
- Mort by Terry Pratchett (Doubleday Book Club, 1989).
- The Jewel in the Skull by Michael Moorcock (Ace Books, 1989)
- The Magic Wagon by Joe R. Lansdale (Borderlands Press, 1990).
- Edgeworks I by Harlan Ellison (White Wolf, 1995)
- Slippage by Harlan Ellison (Mark V. Zeising Books, 1997)
- The Confidential Casebook of Sherlock Holmes by Marvin Kaye (St. Martin's Press, 1997)
- Parallelities by Alan Dean Foster (Doubleday SF Book Club, 1998).
- The View from Hell by John Shirley (Subterranean Press, 2000)
- Bottled in Blonde by Hugh B. Cave (Fedogan & Bremer, 2000)
- The Infernal Device and Others by Michael Kurland (St. Martin's Press, 2001)
- Serpent Girl by Ray Garton (Cemetery Dance Publications, 2006)
- Mad Dogs by Brian Hodge (Cemetery Dance Publications, 2007)
- The Story of Noichi the Blind by Chet Williamson (Cemetery Dance Publications, 2007)
- Kill Whitey by Brian Keene (Cemetery Dance Publications, 2008)
- Poe by Stewart O'Nan (Lonely Road Books, 2008)

=== Frontispieces and interior illustrations ===
- Deathbird Stories by Harlan Ellison (Easton Press, 1989) - Frontispiece and five color interiors
- Maps in a Mirror by Orson Scott Card (Easton Press, 1990) - Frontispiece and one interior
- The Dead Zone by Stephen King (Easton Press, 1992) - Frontispiece and two color interiors
- The Dunwich Horror by H.P. Lovecraft (Easton Press, 1993) - Frontispiece and two interiors
- The Chronicles of Pern: First Fall by Anne McCaffrey (Easton Press, 1994) - Frontispiece
- Gather, Darkness by Fritz Leiber (Easton Press, 1996) - Frontispiece
- Gormenghast Trilogy by Mervyn Peake (Easton Press, 1997) - Frontispiece
- Dark Forces: The 25th Anniversary Edition edited by Kirby McCauley (Lonely Road Books, 2007) - Jill Bauman illustrated "The Bingo Master" by Joyce Carol Oates, "The Garden of Blackred Roses" by Charles L. Grant and "Children of the Kingdom" by T.E.D. Klein
- A Lovecraft Retrospective: Artists Inspired by H.P Lovecraft from Centipede Press, 2008 - Includes two illustrations by Jill Bauman
- The Passage by Justin Cronin (Cemetery Dance Publications, 2010) - Interior greyscale illustrations

=== Trading cards and collectible card games ===
- Fantasy Adventures by Mayfair Games
- Cthulhu Mythos by Fantasy Flight Games

== Poetry and short stories ==
=== Poems ===
- "Bedtime," from Silver Web magazine (Fall/Winter, 1993)
- "The Wanderer," from Worlds of Fantasy and Horror magazine #3 (Summer, 1996)
- "Black Ghost," from Weird Tales magazine #318 (Winter, 1999)
- "Inhuman," from Inhuman magazine #2
- "Nightlife," from Flesh & Blood magazine #11 (2003)
- "The Storm," from Space & Time magazine #97 (2003)
- "Dark," "Weaver of Dreams," and "The Empty House" from The Horror Express magazine #3 (Winter, 2004)
- "Oracle," from Weird Tales magazine, Volume 60, #4 (December, 2004)

=== Short stories ===
- "Mousenight", a short story (written with Alan M. Clark) from Bedtime Stories to Darken Your Dreams edited by Bruce Holland Rogers.

== Guest of Honor appearances ==
- Artist Guest of Honor at the 1982 at Necon, Bristol, Rhode Island (program book included an interview with Jill Bauman)
- Artist Guest of Honor at the 1992 at the World Fantasy Convention (program book included an interview with Jill Bauman)
- Artist Guest of Honor at the 1990 I-Con, Stony Brook University, NY (program book included an interview with Jill Bauman)
- Artist Guest of Honor at the 1991 World Horror Convention, Nashville Tennessee
- Artist Guest of Honor at the 1996 Albacon, Albany, New York (program book included an interview with Jill Bauman)
- Artist Guest of Honor at the 1999 Philcon, Philadelphia (program book included an interview with Jill Bauman)
- Artist Guest of Honor at the 2001 Chattacon, Chattanooga, Tennessee (program book included an interview with Jill Bauman)
