= Diapason =

Diapason may refer to:

- Diapason (interval), the name of the just octave in Pythagorean tuning
- Diapason (pipe organ), a tonal grouping of the flue pipes of a pipe organ
- Diapason (magazine), a French classical music magazine
- The Diapason (magazine), an American magazine for organ builders and players
- Diapason normal, the official French standard of concert pitch
- Diapason, a 1978 novel by Thomas Sullivan
- Diapason, a mission in the 2006 combat flight simulator Ace Combat Zero: The Belkan War

== See also ==
- Tuning fork (diapason in Italian and French)
