= Alan Ryan (horror writer) =

American novelist

Alan Peter Ryan (May 17, 1943 – June 3, 2011) was an American author and editor, known for his work in the horror genre in the 1980s.

== Life ==
Ryan was born on May 17, 1943, in Bronx, New York. He had Irish ancestry through his grandmother, and Irish motifs were sometimes featured in his fiction, such as in the short story "The Bones Wizard" (1984). An American author of Irish ancestry visiting Ireland for the first time is the main character in Cast a Cold Eye.

Working as a book reviewer for The New York Times, Ryan was first spurred into the horror genre when his successful short story "Sheets", based on his own job at Macy's as a sheets salesman, was reprinted in 1980's Year's Best Horror anthology. He was a nominee for the John W. Campbell Award for Best New Writer that year. Encouraged by Charles L. Grant as well as his friends Thomas Monteleone and Jill Bauman, Ryan wound up selling his first paperback original, Panther!, on proposal for $6000.

During the following years he published several more horror novels and short stories, but around 1990 he abandoned literature for about twenty years. He returned in 2011 with a new novel, Amazonas, which came out after his death of pancreatic cancer at the age of 68 in Rio de Janeiro, Brazil, where he lived. In 2012, a posthumous collection of his latest stories appeared, entitled The Back of Beyond: New Stories. In 2014, his posthumous novel "The Slave Tree", was released. All three posthumous books were published by Cemetery Dance.

== Work ==
Ryan was a prolific horror author and also a respected editor, with notable anthologies including World Fantasy Award nominees Perpetual Light (1982) and Night Visions: In the Blood (1984, first in the Night Visions series published by Berkley and later Subterranean Press). These anthologies feature works from authors like Charles L. Grant, Robert Silverberg and Brian Aldiss. He also edited Halloween Horrors (1986), Vampires (1987; re-edited as The Penguin Book of Vampire Stories in 1988), and Haunting Women (1988).

=== Novels ===
- Panther! (1981)
- The Kill (1982)
- Dead White (1983)
- Cast a Cold Eye (1984)
- Amazonas (as Alan Peter Ryan, 2011)
- The Slave Tree (as Alan Peter Ryan, 2014)

=== Short stories ===
Most of his stories were compiled in the following collections:

- Quadriphobia (1986). Includes:
  - "Kiss the Vampire Goodbye"
  - "The Man Who Killed Forever"
  - "Candlewyck"
  - "The Queen of Killimanjaro"
- The Bones Wizard and Other Stories (1988). Includes:
  - "The Bones Wizard", which won the 1985 World Fantasy Award for Best Short Story. It was first published in Whispers magazine.
  - "Babies from Heaven"
  - "Bundoran, Co. Donegal"
  - "Pieta"
  - "Sand"
  - "Following the Way"
  - "The Lovely and Talented Maxine Kane"
  - "Sheets"
  - "The Rose of Knock"
  - "Hear the Whistle Blowing"
  - "Waiting for the Papers"
  - "Memory and Desire"
- The Back of Beyond: New Stories (as Alan Peter Ryan, 2012). Includes:
  - "Sexual Exploration is a Crime"
  - "The Winter's tale"
  - "Starvation Alley"
  - "The Mountain Man"
