= Kirby McCauley =

American horror fiction literary agent (1941–2014)

- Born: September 11, 1941; Minnesota, U.S.
- Died: August 30, 2014 (aged 72)
- Occupation(s): Literary agent and Editor

Kirby McCauley (September 11, 1941 – August 30, 2014) was a Minnesota-born American fan of the macabre who went on to a career as a major literary agent and editor professionally based in New York City, becoming influential in modern horror.

== Early life ==
Kirby McCauley attended the University of Minnesota and worked as an insurance salesman in the Twin Cities. He was a fan of H. P. Lovecraft and the Weird Tales school of horror writers. By the mid-1960s McCauley was corresponding with his favourite supernatural writer, British ghost story great Robert Aickman. He met the Arkham House authors in and around his native Minneapolis, including Carl Jacobi, Donald Wandrei, and August Derleth.

In 1973, Etchings and Odysseys magazine was launched in Minneapolis by McCauley, John J. Koblas, Eric Carlson, Joe West and others.

== Career ==
When he decided to move to New York City in the 1970s to become a literary agent, writer and friend Richard L. Tierney helped drive him there to set up. McCauley soon had a successful agency representing authors such as Stephen King, Roger Zelazny, and George R. R. Martin, who credits him with helping to launch his writing career.

In the following years King's star rose steadily, a result both of his productivity and the promotion his agent provided for him. The novel Pet Sematary is dedicated to McCauley, and all but the earliest of the pseudonymous Richard Bachman novels were copyrighted in his name; for the first edition of Thinner (1984), McCauley provided him with a fake author picture of the elusive "Bachman" that actually showed his own insurance agent, Richard Manuel. King's memoir On Writing (2000) covers the years he worked with McCauley. The success of King convinced publishers that a market existed for this sort of fiction and a host of contracts were signed by McCauley, who represented many horror writers with his agency.

In 1975, McCauley chaired the first World Fantasy Convention, an event he conceived with T. E. D. Klein and several others.

McCauley was a co-executive producer on the John Carpenter-directed 1983 movie of Stephen King's novel Christine.

He received special thanks on the 1987 King-based movie Creepshow 2 and the 2008 documentary about the making of Frank Darabont's 2007 version of King's The Mist, titled When Darkness Came: The Making of The Mist.

== Works edited ==
- Night Chills. NY: Avon, Nov 1975.
- Beyond Midnight. NY: Berkley, Nov 1976. Italian edition as Racconti senzo respiro. Volume primo (trans. Giuseppe Lippi). Mondadori, 1981.
- Frights. NY: St Martin's, 1976. London: Gollancz, 1977. US paperback Warner, 1977. Italian edition as Racconti senzo respiro. Volume secondo (trans. Giuseppe Lippi). Mondadori, 1981. UK paperback in two volumes as Frights 1 and Frights 2, Sphere, 1979.
- Dark Forces. NY: Viking, 1980. Published simultaneously in UK by Macdonald. US paperback Bantam, 1981. Limited 25th Anniversary edition issued in 2007 by Lonely Road Books (Forest Hills, MD). German edition as Acht Stationen des Grauens (Moewig Verlag; trans Elisabeth Simon). Dutch edition as Macaber Carnaval (Loeb, 1983; reprint 1990; new edition In der Toren publisher, 1993).
- Stille Nacht, grausame Nacht (Moewig Verlag, 1979, 1985).
- Hammett, Dashiell. Nightmare Town: Stories (edited with Martin H. Greenberg and Ed Gorman). NY: Knopf Doubleday, 2000. Vintage Crime/Black Lizard, 2000.

== Awards ==
McCauley was the recipient of the 1996 Minnesota Fantasy Award, presented at Arcana 26 (Oct 4–6, 1996) - see Arcana (convention).

== Interviews with McCauley ==
- "The Kirby McCauley Interview" (1978) by David Bischoff. Thrust No 10 (Spring 1978)
- Dark Forces: The 25th Anniversary Special Edition (Lonely Road Books, 2007). Interview by Kealan Patrick Burke

== Death ==
He died of kidney failure associated with long-term diabetes in August 2014.

== Awards ==
- 1979 World Fantasy Convention Award
- 1981 World Fantasy Award—Collection for Dark Forces
- 1996 Minnesota Fantasy Award
