= The Soft Whisper of the Dead =

1982 novel by Charles L. Grant

- Dust-jacket from the first edition.
- Author: Charles L. Grant
- Illustrator: R. J. Krupowicz
- Cover artist: R. J. Krupowicz
- Language: English
- Series: Oxrun Station
- Genre: Horror
- Publisher: Donald M. Grant, Publisher, Inc.
- Publication date: 1982
- Publication place: United States
- Media type: Print (hardback)
- Pages: 207
- ISBN: 0-937986-55-0
- OCLC: 9812722
- Dewey Decimal: 813/.54 19
- LC Class: PS3557.R265 S6 1982
- Preceded by: The Grave
- Followed by: The Dark Cry of the Moon

The Soft Whisper of the Dead is a horror novel by the American writer Charles L. Grant. It was first published in 1982 by Donald M. Grant, Publisher, Inc. in an edition of 2,800 copies, of which 300 were signed by the author and the artist. The book is the first volume of an internal trilogy which is part of Grant's Oxrun Station series. Though it was the first book of the trilogy to be published, the story is the middle of the series' timeline.

== Plot ==
Police detective Ned Stockton investigates a series of gruesome murders in Oxrun Station, Connecticut. The victims are found drained of blood, with wounds on their throats.

The killings coincide with a visit from Pamela Squires' old childhood friend, Saundra Chambers. Saundra has spent many years in Europe, and returns a changed woman. She's withdrawn and secretive, and is never seen during daylight hours. Accompanying her is the mysterious Count Brastov, an Eastern European nobleman even more elusive than Saundra.

As the deaths mount, Stockton comes to a horrifying realization; his town is being preyed upon by a Vampire.

== Sources ==
- Chalker, Jack L.; Mark Owings (1998). The Science-Fantasy Publishers: A Bibliographic History, 1923-1998. Westminster, MD and Baltimore: Mirage Press, Ltd. p. 329.
