= The Long Night of the Grave =

1986 novel by Charles L. Grant

- Dust-jacket from the first edition.
- Author: Charles L. Grant
- Illustrator: Jill Bauman
- Cover artist: Jill Bauman
- Language: English
- Series: Oxrun Station
- Genre: Horror
- Publisher: Donald M. Grant, Publisher, Inc.
- Publication date: 1986
- Publication place: United States
- Media type: Print (Hardback)
- Pages: 187
- ISBN: 0-937986-87-9 (deluxe edition); ISBN 0-937986-88-7 (trade edition)
- OCLC: 15078492
- Dewey Decimal: 813/.54 19
- LC Class: PS3557.R265 L66 1986
- Preceded by: The Dark Cry of the Moon
- Followed by: The Orchard

The Long Night of the Grave is a horror novel by American writer Charles L. Grant. It was first published in 1986 by Donald M. Grant, Publisher, Inc. in an edition of 1,775 copies, of which 300 were signed and slipcased as a deluxe edition. The book is the third volume of an internal trilogy which is part of Grant's Oxrun Station series. The book includes an afterword by Grant summing up the trilogy.

== Plot ==
A pair of Egyptians, Khirhal Bey and his sister Yasfiera, come to the town of Oxrun Station, Connecticut, to recover ancient relics stolen from the tomb of the high priest Sakhtu. The artifacts, taken by disreputable archeologist Peter Reskin, were sold to a number of wealthy and influential businessmen in the Station to pay off debts.

The men are unwilling to part with their treasures unless they're paid as much as they paid Reskin. Bey and Yasfiera, worshippers of a cult that still reveres Sakhtu, expect the relics returned without recompense, as they claim the items were stolen.

One by one, Reskin and the others are murdered, and the relics taken. The killer leaves behind only gray mold on the bodies. Mold that could only be found in the tombs of Egypt. John Vicar, one of the men Reskin sold an artifact to, comes to a frightening realization; he and his friends are being stalked by a living Mummy.

== Sources ==
- Chalker, Jack L.; Mark Owings (1998). The Science-Fantasy Publishers: A Bibliographic History, 1923-1998. Westminster, MD and Baltimore: Mirage Press, Ltd. p. 332.
