= Bottled in Blonde =

- Dust-jacket from the first edition
- Author: Hugh B. Cave
- Cover artist: Jill Bauman
- Language: English
- Genre: Detective fiction short stories
- Publisher: F & B Mystery
- Publication date: 2000
- Publication place: United States
- Media type: Print (hardback)
- Pages: xii, 241 pp
- ISBN: 1-878252-48-8
- OCLC: 63078493

Bottled in Blonde is a collection of Detective fiction stories by author Hugh B. Cave. It was released in 2000 by F & B Mystery in an edition of 1,100 copies of which 100 were signed by the author and artist. The collection was released in honor of Cave's 90th birthday and features stories about his detective, Peter Kane. The stories originally appeared in Dime Detective Magazine.

== Contents ==
- Foreword
- Introduction, by Don Hutchison
- "The Late Mr. Smythe"
- "Hell on Hume Street"
- "Bottled in Blonde"
- "The Man Who Looked Sick"
- "The Screaming Phantom"
- "The Brand of Kane"
- "Ding Dong Belle"
- "The Dead Don’t Swim"
- "No Place to Hide"
