= Dark Forces (book) =

1980 horror anthology edited by Kirby McCauley

- Cover of the first US edition
- Editor: Kirby McCauley
- Language: English
- Genre: Horror short stories
- Publisher: Viking Press
- Publication date: 1980
- Publication place: United States
- Media type: Print (hardback & paperback)
- Pages: 551
- ISBN: 0-670-25653-6
- OCLC: 6194868
- Dewey Decimal: 813/.0872
- LC Class: PS648.H6 D37

Dark Forces: New Stories of Suspense and Supernatural Horror is an anthology of 23 original horror stories, first published by The Viking Press in 1980 and as a paperback by Bantam Books in 1981. It was edited by New York City literary agent Kirby McCauley. Dark Forces won the World Fantasy award for best anthology/collection in 1981 and is celebrated in an essay by Christopher Golden in Horror: Another 100 Best Books, edited by Stephen Jones and Kim Newman.

In 2006, Dark Forces: The 25th Anniversary Edition was announced by Lonely Road Books, and it sold out within days of being announced. It was published in late 2007 as a limited edition of 300 copies and as a lettered edition of 26 copies. It featured the same stories, but it also included signatures from the editor and all of the artists, a new interview of Kirby McCauley conducted by Kealan Patrick Burke, a new cover by Bernie Wrightson, and over twenty-four new color and black and white inner illustrations by Jill Bauman, Glenn Chadbourne, Alan M. Clark, Allen Koszowski, Alex McVey, Keith Minnion, Chad Savage, and Erik Wilson.

== Background ==
The idea for an ambitious new collection of horror and supernatural stories was suggested to Kirby McCauley by British publisher Anthony Cheetham. As he started planning it, McCauley was partly inspired by the editorial work of August Derleth in his search for top-quality horror fiction, and partly by Harlan Ellison's Dangerous Visions in his aim to get new and established writers to submit previously unpublished stories without any editorial restrictions or narrow theme.

McCauley writes in his original introduction, "I set out to offer as many of the subjects and moods and general directions the fantastic tale has tended traditionally to take as I could, but hopefully in imaginative, fresh ways." About his method of finding material, he writes: "I approached by letter or telephone nearly every writer living who had tried his or her hand at this type of story and whose writing I like personally. Predictably enough, some were able to respond with stories, some were not."

== Contents ==
- Introduction by Kirby McCauley
- "The Mist" by Stephen King
- "The Late Shift" by Dennis Etchison
- "The Enemy" by Isaac Bashevis Singer
- "Dark Angel" by Edward Bryant
- "The Crest of Thirty-six" by Davis Grubb
- "Mark Ingestre: The Customer's Tale" by Robert Aickman
- "Where the Summer Ends" by Karl Edward Wagner
- "The Bingo Master" by Joyce Carol Oates
- "Children of the Kingdom" by T. E. D. Klein
- "The Detective of Dreams" by Gene Wolfe
- "Vengeance Is." by Theodore Sturgeon
- "The Brood" by Ramsey Campbell
- "The Whistling Well" by Clifford D. Simak
- "The Peculiar Demesne" by Russell Kirk
- "Where the Stones Grow" by Lisa Tuttle
- "The Night Before Christmas" by Robert Bloch
- "The Stupid Joke" by Edward Gorey
- "A Touch of Petulance" by Ray Bradbury
- "Lindsay and the Red City Blues" by Joe Haldeman
- "A Garden of Blackred Roses" by Charles L. Grant
- "Owls Hoot in the Daytime" by Manly Wade Wellman
- "Where There's a Will" by Richard Matheson and Richard Christian Matheson
- "Traps" by Gahan Wilson

== Influences and homages ==
Clive Barker has stated in Faces of Fear that reading the great variation of horror stories in Dark Forces encouraged him to start writing his own stories without taboos or restrictions for The Books of Blood.

Edward Bryant's story "Dark Angel" introduced modern-day witch Angela Black, whose name reflects her moral ambiguity. In 1991, Black returned in Bryant's novel Fetish.

When asked by Melissa Mia Hall for an interview in Amazing Stories about a favorite in his own body of work, Gene Wolfe answered: "My topmost story would be 'The Detective of Dreams' in Dark Forces."

Author Christopher Golden has stated that Dark Forces "approached horror as literature with a sturdy defiance, McCauley recruiting Isaac Bashevis Singer and Joyce Carol Oates, among others, to contribute unsettling tales." He also called the anthology "a bridge, a mission statement, the quintessential collection of horror stories from the 1980s [and] one of horror's finest moments."
