= Jackals (novel) =

1994 novel by Charles L. Grant

- Dust-jacket from the NEL Paperback Edition
- Author: Charles L. Grant
- Language: English
- Genre: Horror novel, Thriller novel
- Publisher: New English Library
- Publication date: 1994
- Publication place: United States
- Media type: Print (Paperback)
- Pages: 386
- ISBN: 978-0340624791
- Preceded by: Raven (1993)
- Followed by: The Black Carousel Collection (1995)

Jackals is a horror novel and thriller novel by Charles L. Grant. It was first published in 1994 by Forge Books in the United States and in the UK by New English Library. Jackals is the author's final stand-alone novel before his death in 2006. Grant continued to write novels in various series - and genres - and short stories for anthologies. Stephen King said of Jackals: "[t]he premier horror writer of his or any generation".

== Plot ==
Locals from a small town cruise the rural back roads in order to prey on solitary drivers.
