= The Dark Cry of the Moon =

1986 novel by Charles L. Grant

- Dust-jacket from the first edition
- Author: Charles L. Grant
- Illustrator: R. J. Krupowicz
- Cover artist: R. J. Krupowicz
- Language: English
- Series: Oxrun Station
- Genre: Horror
- Publisher: Donald M. Grant, Publisher, Inc.
- Publication date: 1986
- Publication place: United States
- Media type: Print (hardback)
- Pages: 191
- ISBN: 0-937986-76-3 (deluxe edition); ISBN 0-937986-77-1 (trade edition)
- OCLC: 18258702
- Dewey Decimal: 813/.54 19
- LC Class: PS3557.R265 D37 1985
- Preceded by: The Soft Whisper of the Dead
- Followed by: The Long Night of the Grave

The Dark Cry of the Moon is a horror novel by American writer Charles L. Grant. It was first published in 1986 by Donald M. Grant, Publisher, Inc. in an edition of 1,450 copies, of which 300 were signed, numbered and boxed as a deluxe edition. The book is the second volume of an internal trilogy which is part of Grant's Oxrun Station series, though it's the first story in the series timeline. .

== Plot ==
In Oxrun Station, Connecticut, blacksmith Elijah MacFarland is killed by a huge, gray wolf. The killing is witnessed by Jeddy Tripper, a local boy. Jeddy runs and hides from the wolf. When Jeddy's father comes looking for the boy, he's also killed by the wolf.

Police chief Lucas Stockton organizes a hunt for the beast, and searches for the missing Jeddy. He's also preoccupied by his budding romance with Johanna Pendleton. Complicating the matter is the return to the Station of Bartholomew and Lawrence Drummond, Bart from a grand tour of Europe, Larry from the American Civil War. Both men encountered horrors that changed them. Bartholomew is also interested in Johanna, making Lucas jealous.

As more torn bodies appear in Oxrun Station, Lucas is warned by Maria, his housekeeper of Romany heritage, that the creature stalking the town is no ordinary wolf. It's a Werewolf, and it will keep hunting people until it's killed.

== Sources ==
- Chalker, Jack L.; Mark Owings (1998). The Science-Fantasy Publishers: A Bibliographic History, 1923-1998. Westminster, MD and Baltimore: Mirage Press, Ltd. p. 331.
