= The Mist (film) =

2007 film by Frank Darabont

- Theatrical release poster
- Directed by: Frank Darabont
- Screenplay by: Frank Darabont
- Based on: The Mist by Stephen King
- Produced by: Frank Darabont; Liz Glotzer
- Starring: Thomas Jane; Marcia Gay Harden; Laurie Holden; Andre Braugher; Toby Jones
- Cinematography: Rohn Schmidt
- Edited by: Hunter M. Via
- Music by: Mark Isham
- Production companies: Dimension Films; Darkwoods Productions
- Distributed by: Dimension Films (United States) (through Metro-Goldwyn-Mayer); The Weinstein Company (International)
- Release dates: October 18, 2007 (ShowEast); November 21, 2007 (United States)
- Running time: 126 minutes
- Country: United States
- Language: English
- Budget: $13–18 million
- Box office: $57.3 million

The Mist is a 2007 American science fiction psychological horror film produced, written, and directed by Frank Darabont. Based on Stephen King's 1980 novella of the same name, the film stars an ensemble cast including Thomas Jane, Marcia Gay Harden, Laurie Holden, Andre Braugher and Toby Jones. The plot follows a group of people in the small town of Bridgton, Maine, who become trapped inside a supermarket after a mysterious mist envelops the town, concealing deadly, Lovecraftian creatures. As fear and paranoia spread, tensions rise among the survivors.

While the film is primarily a monster movie, it explores how ordinary people react under extreme circumstances. Darabont notably altered the novella's ending, a change that King praised, stating that people who spoil the film's ending should be "hung by the neck until dead".

The Mist was filmed in Shreveport, Louisiana, beginning in February 2007, premiered at ShowEast on October 18, 2007, and was released in the United States on November 21, 2007, by Dimension Films (through Metro-Goldwyn-Mayer), with The Weinstein Company distributing in international markets. The film received generally positive reviews from critics, and grossed $57.3 million on a $13–18 million budget.

== Plot ==
A severe thunderstorm strikes Bridgton, Maine, causing a tree to crash through the lakeside home of artist David Drayton, his wife Stephanie, and their eight-year-old son, Billy. While surveying the damage the next morning, they notice a thick mist advancing over the lake. David and Billy leave with their neighbor Brent Norton to buy supplies in town. Along the way, they pass several military convoys.

From inside the supermarket, they watch police cars speed down the street. A terrified local, Dan Miller, runs into the store and warns of a danger lurking in the mist. As a civil alert siren sounds, store managers Ollie Weeks and Bud Brown close off the supermarket, and the mist envelops the store. Soon after, a woman leaves alone to get to her children. Against David's advice, bagger Norm starts to go outside to fix the store's emergency generator, but he is grabbed by a tentacled creature and dragged into the mist. Afterwards, the survivors begin barricading the store while religious fanatic Mrs. Carmody preaches that the mist is divine punishment. Brent, skeptical of the danger, leaves the store with a group of people, but does not return.

David forms connections with several people in the store, including Amanda Dunfrey and Irene Reppler, two teachers who came into conflict with Carmody over her religious take on the ongoing disaster. Amanda carries a revolver in her purse and gives it to Ollie, who is a former regional shooting champion. As night falls, enormous flying insects, attracted to the lights, swarm to the store windows and are preyed on by pterodactyl-like creatures. One of the predators smashes a window, allowing both species inside. In the ensuing panic, Sally and Tom are killed while another receives fatal burns while attempting to incinerate the insects. Meanwhile, Carmody is miraculously spared from an insect, which convinces her to proselytize more fervently and gain followers among the survivors.

A group led by David ventures to a nearby pharmacy in search of medical supplies but is attacked by deadly spider-like creatures. They discover an MP trapped in a web-like structure who is alive. He starts to say the military is responsible for what's happening, but tiny versions of the spider creatures begin to burst out of his body, and he dies. Upon their return to the supermarket, tensions rise as Carmody calls for sacrifices to appease the monsters, singling out a soldier named Jessup, who reveals that the mist was the result of a military experiment to find other dimensions gone wrong. He is stabbed, thrown outside and immediately killed by a monstrous creature.

The next morning, Carmody demands that Billy and Amanda be sacrificed, but Ollie shoots and kills her, returning her followers to their senses and allowing David and his group to escape the store. After Ollie and several others are killed by the creatures, David grabs his gun and drives off with the survivors. The group stops by David's house, where they see Stephanie's dead body. As the group continue their drive through the mist, they pass scenes of widespread destruction, a colossal creature crosses their path as they move on before eventually running out of gas.

With no hope left, David mercy-kills the group with the last four bullets, including Billy. David steps out of the vehicle and screams for the monsters to come and kill him. Suddenly, the mist begins to clear, as the U.S. Army arrives soon after to exterminate the creatures and rescue survivors. One of the survivors is the woman who left at the onset of the disaster, now safe and reunited with her children. Realizing that his actions were unnecessary, a distraught David collapses, screaming in anguish.

== Cast ==
- Thomas Jane as David Drayton, a painter who ends up trapped in the supermarket with his son Billy
- Marcia Gay Harden as Mrs. Carmody, a religious fanatic who believes the mist to be the wrath of God
- Laurie Holden as Amanda Dumfries, a new teacher at the local school. She carries a Colt revolver with her at all times
- Andre Braugher as Brent Norton, a big-city attorney and David's neighbor
- Toby Jones as Ollie Weeks, the supermarket's assistant manager, who is experienced with guns
- William Sadler as Jim Grondin, a belligerent and weak-minded mechanic
- Jeffrey DeMunn as Dan Miller, who takes shelter in the market after witnessing the dangers from the mist
- Frances Sternhagen as Irene Reppler, an elderly teacher and Amanda's co-worker
- Alexa Davalos as Sally, a cashier at the supermarket and Billy's babysitter
- Nathan Gamble as Billy Drayton, David's eight-year-old son
- Chris Owen as Norm, a bag boy
- Sam Witwer as Private Wayne Jessup, a soldier stationed at the nearby Arrowhead military base
- Robert Treveiler as Bud Brown, the supermarket's manager
- David Jensen as Myron LaFleur, a mechanic who works with Jim
- Melissa McBride as an unnamed woman who left her kids alone at home (uncredited)

== Production ==
=== Development ===
Director Frank Darabont first encountered Stephen King's novella The Mist in the 1980 anthology Dark Forces and was immediately interested in adapting it into a film. Originally, Darabont considered The Mist for his directorial debut, but instead chose to adapt another of King's novellas, Rita Hayworth and Shawshank Redemption (1982) into The Shawshank Redemption (1994), which went on to become a major critical success. After completing The Shawshank Redemption, Darabont reiterated his interest in The Mist in 1994, but chose to direct The Green Mile (1999), an adaptation of King's 1996 novel of the same name, before revisiting The Mist.

Darabont eventually set up a first-look deal for The Mist with Paramount Pictures, having been entrusted feature film rights by Stephen King. By December 2004, Darabont said that he had begun writing an adapted screenplay for The Mist, and by October 2006, the project moved from Paramount to Dimension Films. Actor Thomas Jane was brought into early negotiations to star in the film, which would eventually begin production in early 2007.

=== Writing ===
"The story is less about the monsters outside than about the monsters inside, the people you're stuck with, your friends and neighbors breaking under the strain."
— Darabont on The Mist

Darabont chose to film The Mist because he wanted to create a "very direct, muscular" film, in contrast to the "straighter dramas" of his previous King adaptations. Darabont devised a new, darker ending for the film, which King praised, describing it as one that would be unsettling for studios and frightening. But King assumed that "people who go to see a horror movie don't necessarily want to be sent out with a Pollyanna ending."

Darabont described The Mist as quaint in its elements of monsters and fear of the unknown, compared to the contemporary popularity of films with torture porn. The director saw The Mist as a throwback to Paddy Chayefsky and William Shakespeare, explaining that it was about "people at each other" more than the monsters themselves. Comparing his film to Lord of the Flies, but with "some cool monsters in it," Darabont highlighted the element of fear that compels people to behave primitively. He also cited influences such as The Twilight Zone episode "The Monsters Are Due on Maple Street" and Alfred Hitchcock's film Lifeboat (1944).

In adapting the novella, Darabont altered some character dynamics. For instance, the novella includes a brief extramarital affair between the characters David Drayton and Amanda Dumfries, but Darabont chose to instead create a more emotional, surrogate family dynamic between them in the film. Jane, who played David, noted that his character and Amanda (Laurie Holden) become a "little unit" in the face of the horrors they endure together. Holden compared the nightmare to the experience of survivors at the Louisiana Superdome during Hurricane Katrina.

The film also elaborates on the origins of the mist, which is left vague in the novella. Darabont introduced an explanation involving the Arrowhead Project, a military experiment that opened portals to other dimensions. He wrote in 2005, but did not film, an opening scene in which the thunderstorm causes a malfunction at the project's lab that allows a portal to stay open too long.

=== Production ===
In December 2006, Jane finalized his role in The Mist, joining the cast as Drayton. By January 2007, additional actors such as Holden and Andre Braugher were also confirmed for key roles. William Sadler, Jeffrey DeMunn and Brian Libby, each of whom appeared in Darabont's previous Stephen King adaptations The Shawshank Redemption and The Green Mile, were cast in supporting roles. Sadler had previously played Jane's role, David Drayton, in a 1986 audiobook version of The Mist. Darabont wanted to cast King in the supporting role that eventually went to Libby, an offer that King turned down because he did not want to travel to film the part. Production began in February 2007 at StageWorks of Louisiana, a sound stage and film production facility in Shreveport, Louisiana. Later that month, Marcia Gay Harden and Toby Jones joined the ensemble cast. The filming was scheduled to begin on February 20.

Darabont sought a "fluid, ragged documentary" style for the film, drawing inspiration from his experience directing an episode of The Shield. To achieve this, he enlisted the same camera crew. Although Darabont considered shooting The Mist digitally, he ultimately chose to film on 400 ASA Fujifilm to give it a grainy, not "too beautiful" texture.

Darabont reportedly based David Drayton on renowned poster designer Drew Struzan. The film includes a nod to King's The Dark Tower series, with Drayton seen painting an image based on the books in the opening scene. This artwork was created by Struzan, whose work also appears in the form of posters for films like The Shawshank Redemption and The Green Mile. Struzan went on to produce a poster for ''The Mist'', but this image was not used in the film's marketing campaign.

Darabont worked closely with the production design team to blend multiple eras within the film's aesthetic, avoiding an overtly modern or period-specific feel. This mix is evident in details like characters using cell phones, while military personnel are shown driving older Jeeps instead of modern Humvees.

Around 100 extras from the Shreveport area were used, with 60 of them intricately interwoven into scenes with the main cast to get the film participants as involved as possible. Local Louisiana brands, such as Zapp's potato chips, were featured as part of the film's effort to ground its setting in a recognizable location..

The exterior shots of the grocery store were filmed in Vivian, Louisiana, at the now demolished Tom's Market.

=== Music ===
Darabont chose to use music to minimal effect in The Mist to capture the "heavier feel" of the darker ending he had written to replace the one from the novella. The director explained, "Sometimes movie music feels false. I've always felt that silent can be scarier than loud, a whisper more frightening than a bang, and we wanted to create a balance. We kept music to a minimum to keep that vérité, documentary feel." Darabont chose to overlay the song "Host of Seraphim" by the band Dead Can Dance, a spiritual piece characterized by wailing and chanting. As a fan of Dead Can Dance, Darabont thought that the song played "as a requiem mass for the human race." The original score was composed by Academy Award-nominated composer Mark Isham.

=== Effects ===
Darabont hired artists Jordu Schell and Bernie Wrightson to assist in designing the creatures for the film. Greg Nicotero worked on the film's creature design and make-up effects, while Everett Burrell served as the visual effects supervisor. Nicotero initially sketched out ideas for creature design when Darabont originally expressed interest in filming The Mist in the 1980s. When the project was greenlit, Nicotero, Burrell, and Darabont collaborated on the creature design at round-table meetings at CaféFX. The studio for visual effects had been recommended to Darabont by Guillermo del Toro after Darabont asked the director who created the visual effects for Pan's Labyrinth.

Because the creatures were described in only a few sentences in the novella, Darabont sought to create new designs, but specifically designs which felt unique. Nicotero, who was versed in film and genre history, reviewed past creature designs to avoid duplicating earlier screen monsters. When the designs were completed, Nicotero and Burrell educated the cast on the appearance of the creatures by showing them puppets and the function of their eyes and mouths. The puppet demonstrations served as reference points for the cast, who had to respond to motion-capture dots during filming.

== Release ==
The Mist was screened at the film festival ShowEast on October 18, 2007, at which Darabont received the Kodak Award for Excellence in Filmmaking for his previous works The Shawshank Redemption and The Green Mile.

=== Home media ===
The Mist was released on DVD and Blu-ray on March 25, 2008. Lionsgate Home Entertainment later released the film on Ultra HD Blu-ray on October 3, 2023. The DVD and Blu-ray Special Editions also included Darabont's black and white version of the film, which many fans believe to be a superior version.

== Reception ==
=== Box office ===
The Mist was commercially released domestically on November 21, 2007. Over its opening weekend, the film grossed $8.9 million. By the end of its theatrical run the film grossed $57.3 million worldwide, including $31.7 million from international markets.

=== Critical response ===
On Rotten Tomatoes, The Mist holds a 74% approval rating based on 152 reviews, with an average score of 7.10/10. The site's critical consensus reads: "Frank Darabont's impressive camerawork and politically incisive script make The Mist a truly frightening experience." On Metacritic, the film has a weighted average score of 58/100 based on 29 reviews, indicating "mixed or average reviews". CinemaScore audiences, however, gave it a less favorable "C" rating, on a scale of A to F.

James Berardinelli praised the film, calling it "dark, tense, and punctuated by just enough gore", adding that it finally did justice to a Stephen King horror adaptation. He described it as a "must-see" for fans of the genre not demanding "torture porn". Michael Phillips from the Chicago Tribune echoed this sentiment, labeling it "good and creepy" and "the shape, size and quality of the recent 1408 [also based on King's story]." Lisa Schwarzbaum from Entertainment Weekly commended Harden's performance as the "preaching local crazy lady" Mrs. Carmody, calling it "brilliant". Tom Ambrose of Empire called The Mist "criminally overlooked" and one of the best horror films of recent years.

In contrast, Roger Ebert gave the film a more lukewarm review, rating it 2 stars out of 4. He argued that it was merely a "competently made Horrible Things Pouncing on People movie", and that it did not live up to Darabont's past works like The Shawshank Redemption or The Green Mile. Justin Chang of Variety also had mixed feelings, stating that The Mist worked as a "gross-out B-movie", falling short in its psychological depth due to "one-note characterizations" and an inconsistent tone.

=== Accolades ===
Bloody Disgusting ranked the film No. 4 on their list of the "Top 20 Horror Films of the Decade", with the article saying: "The scary stuff works extremely well, but what really drives this one home is Darabont's focus on the divide that forms between two factions of the townspeople—the paranoid, Bible-thumping types and the more rational-minded, decidedly left-wing members of the populace. This allegorical microcosm of G. W. Bush-era America is spot on, and elevates an already-excellent film to even greater heights."

At the 34th Saturn Awards, The Mist received nominations for Best Horror Film and Best Director (Darabont), with Harden winning Best Supporting Actress.

== TV series ==
In November 2013, Bob Weinstein revealed that he and Darabont were developing a 10-part television series based on the film. In February 2016, Spike picked up the pilot. In April 2016, Spike ordered the series, and Adam Bernstein directed the pilot, which premiered on June 22, 2017.

== See also ==
- The Fog (novel), a 1975 novel by James Herbert
