= Lela E. Buis =

American writer

- Born: Middlesboro, Kentucky, U.S.
- Education: Florida State University; Florida Institute of Technology
- Occupations: Writer; poet; painter
- Writing career
- Pen name: Lee Crittenden, Lena Crittenden
- Genre: speculative fiction
- Website: lelaebuis.wordpress.com

Lela E. Buis is an American speculative fiction writer, playwright, poet and artist who was born in Middlesboro, KY. She graduated from Florida State University (FSU) and the Florida Institute of Technology, and worked in engineering for a number of years at Kennedy Space Center in Cape Canaveral, Florida. She currently resides in Tennessee.

== Background ==
Lela E. Buis was born the elder of two daughters of Joseph N. and Lena Grace Buis. When Joe was discharged from the army after World War II, the couple took ownership of a Century Farm in Claiborne County, Tennessee. Lela Buis attended Claiborne County High School, and as a child was active in farm related organizations such as 4-H clubs. At FSU she worked in research on Computer Assisted Instruction was a member of the Alpha Lambda Delta and Phi Kappa Phi honor societies and was active in Yoshukai Karate. She performed with the Florida State University Dance Theatre, and from 1983 served as president of the Titusville, Florida, non-profit Community Dance Theater. From 2001 to 2003, she was active in the Brevard Playwrights Workshop. In the East Tennessee area, Buis marketed her art and writing at local arts festivals.

== Writing career ==
Buis' first listed short story sale in the science fiction and fantasy genre was in 1991. She often writes fiction inclusive of minorities. From 1992 to 2002, she served as director of The Best of Soft Science Fiction Contest. From 2002 to 2003 she served as editor of the online literary and arts magazine Proteus Review, published by Brevard Community College. Her short stories, poems and articles have appeared in science fiction and fantasy publications including Galaxy, Thirteenth Moon, Star*line and others. That Ridge Press has recently released collections of her short stories and poetry.

Buis is a member of the Knoxville Writers Guild, the Tennessee Mountain Writers, the Science Fiction and Fantasy Writers of America and the Science Fiction Poetry Association.

== Bibliography ==
Selected publications include:

=== Book-length fiction ===
- Desperate Lives (2013)
- Hurricane Season (2013)
- Storm and Shadow (2013)
- Competitive Fauna (2014)
- Moonshadows (2019)
- Case Files of a Spirit Talker (2020)
- The Ivory Pin (2021)

=== Short stories ===
- "Old" (1978)
- "The Winter People" (1991)
- "Mixed Heritage" (1993)
- "Moonshadow" (1993)
- "The Virgin Goddess Maria" (1993)
- "The Hunt" (1993)
- "Readings in the Night" (1993)
- "Haunted" (1994)
- "The Magic Sword" (1994)
- "Wayside Gardens" (1994)
- "Entwined" (1994)
- "Hurricane Season" (1994)
- "Viruses" (1994)
- "Carnival" (1995)
- "The Lay of Urth" (1995)
- "Transmogrifying in Holopaw Florida" (1995)
- "Enigma Variations" (1995)
- "Ground Zero" (1996)
- "Shadows" (1996)
- "Dragon Rain" (1996)
- "Hunted" (1997)
- "Artifacts" (2013)
- "Night at Sloan Pond" (2013)
- "Poison" (2013)
- "Souls" (2013)
- "Survival" (2013)
- "The Journal of Miss Emily Carlton" (2013)
- "The White Owl" (2013)
- "Nightside" (2013)
- "Possession" (2013)
- "The Hatchling" (2013)
- "The Cabin" (2014)
- "A Study of Competitive Fauna" (2014)
- "My Little Town" (2014)
- "That December" (2015)
- "Flotsam" (2015)
- "The Dress" (2016)
- "Only a Signal Shown" (2016)
- "Wine and Magnolias" (2016)
- "Illegal Aliens" (2017)
- "The Knight of Crows" (2017)
- "The Offering" (2017)
- "Death in Nairobi" (2017)
- "Possession" (2020)
- "The Investor" (2020)
- "Haunted Halloween" (2020)

=== As Lee/Lena Crittenden ===
- "GP Venture" (1992)
- "Ascension" (1996)
- "Dark Nights in Dallas" (1996)
- "The Spring at Sloan Pond" (1996)
- "The Stake" (1996)
- "Stud Cops in Dallas" (1996)
- "Anthem" (2000)
- "The Lookout" (2013)
- Silver Spurs (2013)
- "The Mending Tool" (2019)

=== Poetry ===
- "Wild, primitive shore", Proteus IV, April 1977
- "Light softens", Proteus IV, April 1977
- "Leaf fall", Proteus V, April 1978
- "Home...", Proteus V, April 1978
- "The Face" Star*line, April/June 2012
- Entwined: The Marriage of Dream and Vision (2013)
- Defiance: A Narrative Poem (2013)
- "That Box" Silver Blade Magazine, 3 September 2013
- The Magic Sword: A Narrative Poem (2015)
- "Love Flowers Amidst the Blight," Mobius: The Journal of Social Change, Fall 2015
- "Living Forever," Star*line, Fall 2015
- "Fear," Florida State Poets Association Anthology #33, 2015
- "The Haint," SFPA Halloween Poetry Reading, 2016
- "Choosing Between Sins," Florida State Poets Association Anthology #34, 2016
- "Facades," Florida State Poets Association Anthology #35, 2017
- "Leaving," KWG Autumn Poetry Contest, second-place winner, 2017
- "Storm," Florida State Poets Association Anthology #36, 2018
- "Rush," Florida State Poets Association Anthology #37, 2019
- "Zombie Love," Liquid Imagination #43, Nov. 2019
- "Find Me in a Morning," Florida State Poets Association Anthology #38, 2020
- "Deadwood Dick Meets the Ghost of His Dad," Eye to the Telescope #40, 2021
- "White Buffalo Maiden," Florida State Poets Association Anthology #39, 2021
- "The Last 1040" Florida State Poets Association Anthology #40, 2022
- After the Rain: Borderlands" Maitland Public Library Annual Adult Poetry Contest (chapbook), April 28, 2023

=== Plays ===
- Early Morning, Cold Coffee: A Play in One Act, 2001-02

=== Articles and essays ===
- "Realistic Self-Defense: The Bottom Line in Personal Safety" (writing and photography), Black Belt Magazine, February 1988
- "Improved Design for Corrosion Control" (writing and photography), Materials Performance, 1990
- Letter: "On Laura Mixon's Glass House", Scavenger's Newsletter, July 1992 (as Lena Crittenden)
- "Making it in a Free Market," Scavenger's Newsletter, May 1993
- "Science Fiction Inequities," Hear and Now, July 1993
- "Sex and the Female Agenda," Hear and Now, September 1993
- "Misogyny in Discover Magazine," NOW Times, Winter 1993
- Letter: "Connie Willis and Kandis Elliot", Asimov's Science Fiction, December 1993 (as Lena Crittenden)
- Letter: "On Simultaneous Submissions," Scavenger's Newsletter, March 1994
- Letter: "Salutations from the Boo-Boo Brigade", Scavenger's Newsletter, July 1995
- Letter: "Silverberg's Article on Gresham's Law," Asimov's Science Fiction, October 1995
- Letter: "On 'Love This'", Scavenger's Newsletter, October 1996 (as Lena Crittenden)
- "Science Fiction - Shaping the Future", The East Tennessee Writer, January 2014
- "When Is a Dog Not a Dog?", The East Tennessee Writer, August 2014
- "KWG vs. the Demons", The East Tennessee Writer, July 2015
- "What I Did on My Summer Vacation", The East Tennessee Writer, August 2015

=== Illustrations ===
- 13 untitled photos, Black Belt, February 1988
- "Raven", Scavenger's Newsletter, July 1992
- "Bat", Scavenger's Newsletter, March 1994
- "Girl's Face", Spectre Fall 1994
- "Man's face", Spectre, Fall 1994
- "Cat", Scavenger's Newsletter, September 1995
- "Pier with Children" (photograph), Florida State Poets Association Anthology #33, 2015
- "Demon Face," SFPA Halloween Poetry Reading, 2016
- "Spot Sleeps on Burroughs (plus Frazetta)," File 770, 2018
- "Cats Sleep on SFF: Avram Davidson," File 770, 2019
- "Masked Filers Reading SFF: Star*Line." File 770, 2020

== Awards ==
- 2017 Knoxville Writers’ Guild Autumn Contest 2017 - 2nd place for "Leaving"
- FSPA Glidden Award 2020 - Honorable Mention for "Mama Has Gone Off the Deep End Again"
- Poetry Society of Tennessee January 2021 Contest - 2nd place for "Starman Drives"
