= The Mist (TV series) =

2017 American science fiction-horror television series

- Genre: Science fiction; Horror thriller
- Created by: Christian Torpe
- Based on: The Mist by Stephen King
- Starring: Morgan Spector; Alyssa Sutherland; Gus Birney; Danica Curcic; Okezie Morro; Luke Cosgrove; Darren Pettie; Russell Posner; Frances Conroy
- Composers: Sonya Belousova; Giona Ostinelli
- Country of origin: United States
- Original language: English
- No. of seasons: 1
- No. of episodes: 10

Production
- Producers: Guy J. Louthan; Amanda Segel
- Cinematography: André Pienaar
- Running time: 47 minutes
- Production company: Dimension Television

Original release
- Network: Spike
- Release: June 22 – August 24, 2017

The Mist is an American science fiction-horror thriller television series developed by Christian Torpe based on the 1980 novella by Stephen King. Produced by Dimension Television, the series stars Morgan Spector, Alyssa Sutherland, Gus Birney, Danica Curcic, Okezie Morro, Luke Cosgrove, Darren Pettie, Russell Posner and Frances Conroy, and centers around an eerie mist rolls into a small town, where the residents must battle the mysterious mist and its threats, fighting to maintain their morality and sanity.

The Mist aired for one 10-episode season on Spike from June 22 to August 24, 2017. The series received generally mixed reviews from critics, and Spike later cancelled the series on September 27 the same year.

== Premise ==
An unexplained mist slowly envelops the town of Bridgeville, Maine, creating an almost impenetrable barrier to visibility. The residents of the town soon learn the situation is even more precarious as unexplained anomalies and phenomena in the mist attack and kill most who enter it, trapping several groups of people in a shopping mall, a church, and a hospital. Eventually, people begin to see apparitions in the mist from their past, fears, or guilt that help or kill them depending on how they react.

== Cast and characters ==
=== Main ===
- Morgan Spector as Kevin Copeland
- Alyssa Sutherland as Eve Copeland
- Gus Birney as Alex Copeland
- Danica Curcic as Mia Lambert
- Okezie Morro as Bryan Hunt
- Luke Cosgrove as Jay Heisel
- Darren Pettie as Connor Heisel
- Russell Posner as Adrian Garff
- Frances Conroy as Nathalie Raven

=== Recurring ===
- Dan Butler as Gregory Romanov
- Steven Yaffee as Mikhail Demidoff
- Christopher Gray as Tyler
- Dylan Authors as Link
- Darcy Lindzon as Trevor
- Laurie Hanley as Ursula
- Isiah Whitlock Jr. as Gus Bradley
- Romaine Waite as Kyle
- Irene Bedard as Kimi Lucero
- Nabeel El Khafif as Raj El-Fayed
- Greg Hovanessian as Wes Foster
- Mishka Thebaud as Clint Spelling
- Shomari Downer as Elliot Carrillo
- Zenna Davis-Jones as Giselle Rodriguez
- Erik Knudsen as Vic
- Jonathan Malen as Ted
- Holly Deveaux as Zoe
- Andrea Lee Norwood as Susan Parker
- Alexandra Ordolis as Shelley DeWitt
- Lola Flanery as Lila DeWitt

=== Guest ===
- Mary Bacon as Mrs. Carmody
- John Dooks as Eric Carmody
- Christopher Gray as Tyler Denton
- Philip Ettinger as Nash
- Dwain Murphy as Bryan Hunt
- Neal Huff as Dr. Bailey
- Peter Murnik as Mike Copeland
- Marylouise Burke as Anna Lambert
- Shane Daly as Duncan Garff
- Nikki Barnett as Sandy Garff
- Kevin O'Grady as Officer Pundik
- Derek McGrath as Benedict Raven
- Teagle F. Bougery as Clay Greyson

== Episodes ==
No.	Title	Directed by	Written by	Original release date	U.S. viewers (millions)
1	"Pilot"	Adam Bernstein	Christian Torpe	June 22, 2017	0.684
Kevin Copeland and his wife Eve live in a small town with their daughter Alex. Alex is raped at a party, and her best friend Adrian tells her it was Jay Heisel, the quarterback of the football team and the boy she had a crush on. A thick mist soon sweeps through town, something deadly inside of which begins killing people. Eve and Alex become trapped at the local mall, while Kevin is stuck at the police station with Jay's father, Sheriff Connor Heisel, and Adrian. Connor soon leaves Kevin and Adrian and goes to the local church, where Nathalie Raven—whose husband was killed in the mist—and Father Romanov are hiding with several other townsfolk. Kevin and Adrian release two prisoners from the local jail: paranoid soldier Bryan Hunt, an amnesiac who discovered the mist and came to town to warn everyone about it, and mysterious drug addict Mia Lambert. At the mall, Alex is disturbed to find Jay is also trapped there.
2	"Withdrawal"	David Boyd	Story by : Christian Torpe; Teleplay by : Peter Macmanus	June 29, 2017 (Note: The second and third episodes were released online on June 23, 2017.)	0.496
At the mall, manager Gus Bradley takes control and decides to send someone down a hallway filled with mist to try to make contact using an emergency radio. Eve is chosen, but another survivor, Clint, goes with her, despite his friends' obvious worry. While attempting to make contact, Eve attacks Clint, who is then forced to defend himself, but Eve shoots him and leaves his body behind, later she lies about the encounter and hides the gun. At the police station, Kevin, Adrian, Bryan, and Mia escape and make their way to the church. Nathalie, still grieving her husband, starts to mentally unravel while Bryan and Mia strike up an unlikely friendship. Connor continues to mistrust Kevin and his group, having already re-arrested both Bryan and Mia. At the mall, Jay's restless wanderings find that two of Clint's friends have killed themselves.
3	"Show and Tell"	Nick Murphy	Peter Biegen	July 6, 2017	0.428
Kevin pleads with Connor to release Bryan and Mia. Connor indignantly provokes Kevin into assaulting him instead, giving Connor an excuse to arrest him. A distraught Nathalie attempts to kill herself; Mikhail stops her, only to be killed himself. Nathalie claims to have seen God. Adrian tricks Father Romanov and steals his keys. The three now free with Adrian, they escape the church. The mall group finds dog tags on the bodies of Clint's friends. They are ex-military. Wes, Clint's last remaining friend, is also military, but he denies any knowledge. Eve and Alex find a "Jay-free" area of the mall, despite Jay's occasional bids to convince Alex that he did not rape her. Ted and Vic, the game store employees, decide to use the dead bodies as bait. When the others discover this, the majority group decides to establish rules. When someone suggests throwing out those who are a danger to the group, Eve, Alex and a few others secede to another part of the mall. Alex comes up with the idea to release balloon SOS messages.
4	"Pequod"	T.J. Scott	Andrew Wilder	July 13, 2017	0.487
Kevin's group escapes to a gas station. They encounter Clay, who has a working car. Searching for his son, he shows them a picture of someone the group recently found deceased. While Kevin tells the group to withhold, Mia eventually reveals his son is dead, and Bryan is shot in the ensuing confrontation. Clay finally relents them his car, staying behind to look for his son anyway. At the church, Nathalie reads up on the Black Spring, a strange circumstance in which many people died years previously; and she captures a spider in a jar, which she fixates on. Though Father Romanov kills the spider openly, hundreds of baby spiders replace the dead spider after she places it back in the jar. In the mall, Vic and Ted almost retrieve the bodies but Ted is brutally slain, and his body, thrown through a glass door, allowing the mist into the mall and the nearby bookstore. Alex and Lila, reading, become trapped. Vic escapes, but Lila is murdered by a shadowy creature in the mist. As a result, Vic is ejected from the mall.
5	"The Waiting Room"	Richard Laxton	Amanda Segel & Christian Torpe	July 20, 2017	0.538
Kevin's group arrives at the hospital, where a doctor treats Bryan. While searching for Eve and Alex, Kevin finds his brother, Mike, who has been impaled with a rebar. Mia and Bryan grow closer. Mike begs Kevin to end his suffering. Kevin refuses, asking the doctor to treat him. The doctor informs him that Mike can only be treated in the OR, which he will not enter as the mist is in there, but will communicate the operation via headset. The procedure is a startling success, but Kevin slips on the journey back, and the gurney gets overturned. Leeches overwhelm Mike, whom Kevin shoots out of mercy. Mia discovers another patient, the real Bryan Hunt, who was an Arrowhead soldier. He reveals his attacker, Jonah Dixon, whose description matches "Bryan". Mia tricks Adrian out of the car keys, and leaves. Jonah happens upon the real Bryan, who recognizes him. In flashbacks, it is revealed that Kevin is not Alex's biological father.
6	"The Devil You Know"	James Hawes	Noah Griffith & Daniel Stewart	July 27, 2017	0.411
Bryan confronts "Bryan" (Jonah), but is overpowered. Kevin and Adrian discover the car stolen. While searching for another vehicle, Kevin stumbles upon Dr. Bailey prepping a patient to be "fed" to the mist in an attempt to understand it. Captured, Kevin is sedated and sealed in a room with the mist. After hallucinating, his companions find and rescue him, killing Dr. Bailey in the process. Mia returns to her childhood home to search for her stash. After confronting her "mother", who fails to persuade her to join her in death, she flees and drives back to the hospital. In the mall Eve goes to print flyers that state the government is coming, intending to sneakily distribute them. While looting, Alex is locked in a break room by someone who then sets it ablaze. Saved by Jay, she accuses him of having started the fire. The mall survivors see the flyers and become hopeful. At the church, more listen to Nathalie, who tells Connor her belief that the mist is nature's purging. After a talk with Father Romanov, a nervous Link lures Nathalie to the attic to torture her into silence. However, she smashes a window and locks Link in the attic. At the hospital, the power fails, forcing the doors open and letting the mist in. Kevin’s group struggle in vain to get into the psych ward.
7	"Over the River and Through the Woods"	Matthew Penn	Daniel Cameron Talbott	August 3, 2017	0.400
After being rejected by Jonah, Mia tells him what Bryan told her. Tyler apologizes to Adrian for bullying him in the past, and they fall asleep together, before Tyler wakes up to find Adrian missing. Kevin finds corpses that a man named Nash claims were evil, Nash says Adrian is evil too, and reveals himself to have locked Adrian in a room to kill him. Kevin convinces Nash he is evil, not Adrian, and trades himself for Adrian. They fight, and Kevin kills Nash. Tyler stays at the hospital while the others leave for the mall. At the mall, after hearing the main group threw Vic out, Eve plants a walkie-talkie with the group to listen to them. Gus is revealed to be hoarding rations in his office, and Shelley tries to turn the other survivors against Alex. At the church, after being beaten by Connor for allowing Link's actions, Father Romanov confronts Nathalie, and challenges her to a trial by ordeal, to walk into the mist and see if they survive, to show the others what faith to follow. Nathalie agrees, and strips naked before going outside and closing her eyes. Outside, the Four Horsemen of the Apocalypse arrive, and Pestilence impales Father Romanov before dragging him away. Nathalie returns to the church, no longer challenged.
8	"The Law of Nature"	Guy Ferland	Story by : Amanda Segel; Teleplay by : Andrew Wilder & Christian Torpe	August 10, 2017	0.374
The group drives by Adrian's house, and he goes to check on his parents. Adrian finds that his mother is dead, and gets into an argument with his father. While siphoning gas, Mia and Jonah have sex. Kevin finds Vic, having survived his banishment. After Adrian's father calls him out for his bisexuality, Adrian kills him. Kevin enters the house, where Adrian has cut his arm, claiming his father attacked him and he killed him in self-defense. Adrian breaks down and confesses that he was the one who raped Alex. During his breakdown, he knocks Kevin out and escapes, letting the mist into the house to consume Kevin. He returns to the others and claims his father killed Kevin. Shelley witnesses Alex and Jay kissing. When they return to the group, Eve locks Jay in a storage locker underneath the loading dock. Shelley admits to Gus that she set the fire to kill Alex. Gus threatens to tell the group what she did, and she tells him she knows that he was hoarding food in his office. When she attempts to tell the others, he kills her. The others arrive, and after being accused of murder, Gus claims he found Shelley dead and saw Alex running away. At the church, Nathalie tells the others about the "Black Spring". Nathalie asks the group to go to the mall with her and Connor. After most of them refuse, she and those willing to follow leave, burning down the church behind them and killing those who stayed.
9	"The Waking Dream"	Nick Murphy	Amanda Segel	August 17, 2017	0.399
At Adrian's house, Kevin is found by Vic, who stayed behind. They make it to a house, where Kevin reveals Adrian raped Alex. They decide to go to the mall by entering a house every few minutes, but eventually find a house with dead soldiers inside, and encounter a living man, who activates a grenade which lets the mist in, causing Kevin to see Officer Pundik, Mike and Nash, all of whom taunt him for his actions toward them. He then sees an apparition of himself, which he kills, before he and Vic take the car of the soldiers and make it to the mall. At the mall, the main group decides to throw Alex out, and Eve tries to protect her. Adrian, Mia and Jonah arrive at the mall, where Adrian separates from the others to find Alex. He finds Eve and Alex, and tells them Kevin is dead. They are hunted by Gus and others from the main group. When they are caught, they are locked in the same room as Jay. Wes encounters Jonah, and captures him, knocking him out. When Jonah awakens, Wes salutes him and refers to him as "sir". Traveling through the sewers to reach the mall, Trevor suffers a broken leg, and Ursula refuses to leave him; Connor stabs her and throws her down a ladder, leaving them to die by being eaten alive by rats. Connor and Nathalie reach the mall alone.
10	"The Tenth Meal"	Guy Ferland	Christian Torpe	August 24, 2017	0.405
Kevin finds Adrian in a liquor store and brutally beats him for raping Alex and leaving him for dead at Adrian's parents home. He learns from Adrian that the mall survivors plan to exile Alex into the mist because they believe she had killed Shelley, and leaves with Mia to save her. Connor arrives at the mall with Nathalie after being convinced by Nathalie that Jay's death will end the Black Spring. After offering Jay to the mist, Connor makes his way to the mall's entrance where Eve tells him that Alex is his daughter. Kyle kills Kimi when she protests their expulsion. Kevin intervenes and is quickly overpowered by the survivors and is forced out of the mall along with Alex, Eve and Mia. Outside, Alex is attacked in the mist but rescued by Jay. She and Jay run towards the car but Jay is engulfed in the mist and Alex is forced to watch helplessly from the car as the mist kills him. Before they leave, Kevin crashes the car through the mall's entrance – allowing the mist inside to kill the survivors, including Nathalie, while Gus barricades himself in his office. They are joined by Connor, who helps free the car from the wrecked entrance. The group spots a train and follows it to the nearest station, but is shocked when it discovers armed men offering civilians up to the mist. Wes releases Jonah and brings him to Project Arrowhead, which he says has answers about who he is, with Adrian having stowed away in their vehicle.

== Production ==
=== Development ===
Following the release of Frank Darabont's film adaptation of The Mist in 2007, executive producers Bob Weinstein and Harvey Weinstein announced plans to develop a miniseries based on the film. In November 2013, Bob Weinstein announced that a 10-part miniseries would begin production under their Dimension Television banner. It was unclear if film director Darabont would be involved in the series and the development remained stagnant for a period of time.

In September 2015, nearly two years after the project was announced, Dimension Television announced they had signed screenwriter Christian Torpe to pen the entire series. In February 2016, Spike picked up the pilot. In April 2016, it was announced a deal had been reached with Spike to air the entire series. In July 2016, the production company announced the series had been cast and gone into production in Halifax, Nova Scotia.

=== Financing ===
The ten episodes of the first season were reportedly produced on a budget of approximately CA$23 million. The government of Nova Scotia announced in July 2016 that it would contribute CA$5.9 million for the series. The production marks the biggest entertainment production ever to shoot in the province.

=== Casting ===
In July 2016, Dimension Television announced Morgan Spector would play the lead character of Kevin Copeland. Other cast members announced included Frances Conroy, Alyssa Sutherland, Zenna Davis-Jones, Gus Birney, Dan Butler, Luke Cosgrove, Danica Curcic, Okezie Morro, Darren Pettie, Russell Posner and Isiah Whitlock, Jr.

=== Ratings ===
After the pilot episode received strong ratings, viewer numbers rapidly declined. The series averaged a rating of 0.14 in adults aged 18–49, and 462,000 viewers per episode in Nielsen's Live+Same Day ratings. The series was canceled in September 2017.

== Reception ==
=== Critical reception ===
The series received mixed reviews from critics, who praised its atmosphere and special effects, but criticized its story, performances, underdeveloped characters and unfaithfulness to the source material. On Rotten Tomatoes, the series has an approval rating of 59% based on 46 reviews, with an average rating of 5.7/10. The site's critical consensus reads, "The Mist's absorbing atmosphere and solid special effects struggle to overcome a generally uninspired story and performances." On Metacritic, the series has a weighted average score of 54 out of 100 based on 25 critics, indicating "mixed or average reviews".

Chris Scott of The New York Observer described it as "relentlessly bleak, mean, and downright sadistic at nearly every turn", linking this with the falling ratings over the series' course. Indiewire reviewer Ben Travers described the plot as predictable and characters as "pretty awful", leaving viewers "rooting for the mist instead of those running from it".

Ed Power of The Daily Telegraph felt that it was a middling effort for King's works, and that it benefited from sticking to familiar horror themes and tropes.
