= Kim Antieau =

American novelist

Kim Antieau is an American writer, the author of novels, short stories and essays for adults and teenagers, including Mercy, Unbound; Ruby's Imagine; Coyote Cowgirl; The Jigsaw Woman; and The Gaia Websters. She has also published The Salmon Mysteries, a guidebook to a reimagining of the Eleusinian Mysteries, and The Making of an Indie Writer about her decision to break with traditional publishing.

Born in Louisiana, she grew up outside of Brighton, Michigan. She graduated from Eastern Michigan University and lives with her husband, Canadian poet Mario Milosevic, in the Northwest. Aside from writing books, she works as a librarian.

== Selected works ==
- Trudging to Eden (1994)
- The Jigsaw Woman (1996)
- The Gaia Websters (1997)
- Coyote Cowgirl (2003)
- Counting on Wildflowers (2005)
- Mercy, Unbound (2006)
- Broken Moon (2007)
- Ruby's Imagine (2008)
- Church of the Old Mermaids (2008)
- The Salmon Mysteries (2010)
- The First Book of Old Mermaids Tales (2011)
- Deathmark (2011)
- An Old Mermaid Journal (2011)
- The Blue Tail (2011)
- The Fish Wife (2011)
- The Making of an Indie Writer (2011)
- Her Frozen Wild (2012)
- Swans in Winter (2012)
- Jewelweed Station (2012)
- Butch (2012)
- Whackadoodle Times (2012)
- The Desert Siren (2012)
- The Rift (2012)
- Tales Fabulous and Fairy (2012)
- The Old Mermaids Book of Days and Nights (2012)
- The Monster's Daughter (2013)
- Under the Tucson Moon (2013)
- Certified (2014)
- Whackadoodle Times Two (2015)
- Maternal Instincts (2015)
- Queendom: Feast of the Saints (2016)
