= The Mist (novella) =

Book by Stephen King

- Standalone paperback edition cover
- Author: Stephen King
- Language: English
- Genre: Psychological horror, Science fiction, Cosmic horror
- Published in: Dark Forces anthology
- Publisher: Viking Press
- Publication date: 1980, 1985, 2007 (Signet)
- Publication place: United States
- Media type: Print (Hardback & Paperback)
- Pages: 238 pp (Signet)
- ISBN: 978-0451223296

The Mist is a cosmic horror novella by American author Stephen King. Originally written in the summer of 1976, the story was first published by Viking Press in 1980 as part of the Dark Forces anthology, an edited version was subsequently included in King's 1985 collection Skeleton Crew. In the story, the small town of Bridgton, Maine is shrouded in a dense mist that conceals otherworldly creatures. The protagonist and narrator David Drayton, who has taken refuge with his young son in a supermarket, tries to survive against not only the creatures of the mist, but also fanatical aggression from other survivors.

King was inspired to write The Mist by a trip to his local supermarket following a thunderstorm, during which he imagined prehistoric animals and giant insects besieging the building. The Mist was nominated for a World Fantasy Award and a Locus Award in 1981.

A film adaptation directed by Frank Darabont was released in 2007, and a television series based on the novella's premise aired on Spike in 2017.

== Plot ==
The morning after a severe thunderstorm causes a power failure in the town of Bridgton, Maine, an unnaturally thick mist gradually envelops the area. Commercial artist David Drayton, along with his young son Billy and neighbor Brent Norton, the latter with whom David has had a legal dispute in the past, go to the local supermarket for groceries, leaving David's wife Stephanie behind at their home. Upon arrival, their suspicions are aroused by the sound of a siren. The mist completely covers the supermarket and conceals strange and hostile creatures. The situation is aggravated by an earthquake, which damages communications and leaves the store without electricity. When a young bagger, Norm, goes outside to fix a clogged vent in the store's generator, he is dragged into the mist by a mass of giant tentacles.

David and assistant manager Ollie Weeks witness Norm's death and try to convince everyone else of what has happened, imploring that no one leave the store. Norton and a small group of people accuse David of lying and go outside for help, only to be killed by unnatural predatory creatures. Ollie is given a revolver by the young Amanda Dumfries. Large "insects" begin crawling over the outside of the store, attracting pterosaur-like creatures, one of which squirms inside through a broken window and is killed with an improvised torch amidst a general panic. Searching for an escape and needing to treat an elderly woman who was injured in the panic, David leads a group of people to retrieve medical supplies from an adjacent pharmacy, where they encounter huge spider-like creatures. Only half the expedition returns alive, heavily demoralizing the remaining survivors.

Two soldiers from a nearby military base are soon found to have committed suicide in the stockroom, leading Ollie and David to speculate about what they knew, and the much-rumored "Arrowhead Project" experiments conducted at the base where the soldiers were stationed. In the wake of mass hysteria among the survivors, religious fanatic Mrs. Carmody gradually convinces them that the current events fulfill a biblical prophecy of the end times, and that human sacrifice is required to save themselves from God's wrath.

When David, Billy, Ollie, Amanda and a few other survivors attempt to escape to David's car, they are confronted by Mrs. Carmody, who calls on the crowd to offer Billy and Amanda as sacrifices. Ollie shoots and kills Mrs. Carmody, and her "congregation" dissolves in confusion. En route to the car, Ollie and one other survivor are killed, while another flees back to the store. The rest attempt to reach David's house to determine Stephanie's fate, but the driveway is hopelessly blocked by fallen trees. They drive south through a devastated and mist-shrouded New England, witnessing further signs of catastrophe and more mysterious creatures. While stopped for the night at an abandoned Howard Johnson's, David searches the radio bands and, through the mist's interference, possibly hears someone say "Hartford," giving him a last shred of hope.

== Influences ==
King, in the notes section in Skeleton Crew, says The Mist was inspired by a real-life experience, when a massive thunderstorm much like the one that opens the story occurred where King lived at the time. The day after the storm, he went to a local supermarket with his son. While looking for hot dog buns, King imagined a "big prehistoric flying reptile" flapping around in the store. By the time the two were in line to pay for their purchases, King had the basis for his story: survivors trapped in a supermarket surrounded by unknown creatures.

While experiencing the unusual spring weather which precedes the storm, some characters make reference to the real-life Great Blizzard of 1888, which devastated much of the northeastern United States.

== Influence in other media ==
=== Film ===
- A film adaptation of the novella, directed by Frank Darabont and starring Thomas Jane, was released in 2007.
- A second film adaptation is in the works at Warner Bros. Pictures, with Mike Flanagan directing from a screenplay he wrote.

=== Games ===
- In 1985, Mindscape released an interactive fiction computer game based on the novella.
- The developers of the Half-Life video game series, which also deals with creatures from parallel dimensions breaking through to ours, have listed The Mist among their primary influences for the game plot. The first game in the series was originally going to be called Quiver, as a reference to the Arrowhead Project from The Mist.
- The Silent Hill video game series bears many similarities to The Mist. Series composer and producer Akira Yamaoka has cited the novella as a "great source of inspiration" for the development of the original Silent Hill game.

=== Radio ===
- In 1984, the novella was adapted as a full-cast binaural radio drama by Thomas Lopez from ZBS Foundation, starring William Sadler as David Drayton and released by Simon & Schuster, Inc.

=== Television ===
- The Mist, a television series based on the novella, premiered on Spike on June 22, 2017. The series features cast members Morgan Spector, Alyssa Sutherland, Gus Birney, Danica Curcic and Frances Conroy. Spike cancelled the series on September 27, 2017, after one season.

== See also ==
- Stephen King short fiction bibliography
- The Fog (1975), a novel by James Herbert
- Under the Dome, a 2009 novel by Stephen King
- From Beyond (short story)
- Fallout 4: Far Harbor
