= T. M. Wright =

American novelist

- Wright at a book signing in Rochester, NY, 1992
- Born: Terrance Michael Wright; September 9, 1947; Syracuse, New York, U.S.
- Died: October 31, 2015 (aged 68); Corning, New York, U.S.
- Occupations: Writer; poet; artist; illustrator
- Writing career
- Pen name: T. M. Wright, F. W. Armstrong
- Period: 1968–2011
- Genres: Horror fiction, Speculative fiction
- Notable works: Strange Seed, A Manhattan Ghost Story, Cold House
- Website: www.tmwrightonline.net

Terrance "Terry" Michael Wright (September 9, 1947 – October 31, 2015) was an American author best known as a writer of horror fiction, speculative fiction, and poetry.

== Life ==
Terrance Michael Wright was born September 9, 1947, in Syracuse, New York. His father was a traveling salesman and his mother a secretary and later a teacher. He was one of six children. His twin brother, T. Lucien Wright, was also an author in the dark fantasy genre.

T.M. Wright's first publication was a poem in the Newark Courier-Gazette in 1961. His first book was a 1968 non-fiction study on unidentified flying objects, entitled The Intelligent Man's Guide to Flying Saucers (1968; not connected to Isaac Asimov's The Intelligent Man's Guide to series). It was published by AS Barnes's imprint in New Jersey.

In one of his later interviews, Wright defined his own style as "existential horror, existential dark fantasy." He also claimed he'd rather "be remembered as a poet than a novelist." An accomplished artist, Wright made the art for some editions of his own books, such as that in his anthology Bone Soup (2010).

== Work ==
Wright started his fiction career with the novel Strange Seed, published in hardcover in 1978 and in paperback in 1980. The editor was William G. Thompson at Everest House; Thompson had been one of Stephen King's first editors while working at Doubleday, which contributed to the book gaining an enthusiastic blurb from King. The story involves a couple from New York City responding to a mysterious inner force that compels him to seek solace and identity in the ancestral forests of his youth, where he and his wife are soon terrified by the darkly beautiful children dwelling in the woods. Strange Seed was nominated for a World Fantasy Award and would go on to beget four sequels.

A Manhattan Ghost Story, a horror novella imagining a "a city choked with ghosts, some of whom work in bordellos" was published in 1984 by Tor Books. It stars Abner Cray, "one of those shadow-land folks cursed with the ability to see, feel, and interact with the dead", who in turn discovers that his "true love" is not one of the living. A Manhattan Ghost Story was optioned for a film adaptation in 1991, with several actors and directors attached throughout the years (most notably actress Sharon Stone and screenwriter Ron Bass), though the film has never come to fruition. The story would beget two sequels, in 1986 and 2006.

For his Ryerson Biergaten detective series, Wright wrote the first two entries under the pseudonym F.W. Armstrong: The Changing (1985) and The Devouring (1987). Sequels under his own name are Goodlow’s Ghosts (1993) and The Ascending (1994), plus the connected novel Sleepeasy (1993).

Among his standalone novels, Cold House (2003) was nominated for a Bram Stoker Award. His short stories appeared in magazines such as Twilight Zone Magazine, Postscripts, Cemetery Dance, Flesh and Blood Magazine, and Brutarian.

== Death ==
Wright spent his last years in a nursing home in Corning, New York, living with Parkinson's disease. He died on October 31, 2015.

== Selected bibliography ==
=== Strange Seed series ===
- Strange Seed (Everest House, 1978; revised for Twisted Publishing, 2005)
- Nursery Tale (Playboy Press, 1982)
- Children of the Island (Jove, 1983)
- The People of the Dark (1984)
- Erthmun (Orion, 1995; re-released as The Laughing Man by Leisure Books, 2003)

=== A Manhattan Ghost Story series ===
- A Manhattan Ghost Story (Tor Books, 1984; revised for Telos Publishing, 2006)
- The Waiting Room (1986)
- A Spider on My Tongue (Nyx Books, 2006)

=== Ryerson Biergarten series ===
- The Changing (Tor Books, 1985; as F. W. Armstrong)
- The Devouring (Tor Books, 1987; as F. W. Armstrong)
- Goodlow's Ghosts (1992)
- The Ascending (1994)
- Sleepeasy (Gollancz, 1993; Leisure, 2001; connected, but not a direct sequel)

=== Standalone novels ===
- The Woman Next Door (Playboy Press, 1981; Tor Books, 1990)
- The Playground (Tor Books, 1982)
- Carlisle Street (1983)
- The Island (1988)
- The Place (1989)
- The School (1990)
- Boundaries (1990)
- The Last Vampire (1991)
- Little Boy Lost (1992)
- Cold House (Catalyst Press, 2003)
- The House on Orchid Street (2003)
- The Eyes of the Carp (Cemetery Dance, 2005) (novella)
- I Am the Bird (2006) (novella)
- Blue Canoe (2008)
- Sally Pinup (2010) (novella)

=== Short stories ===
- "His Mother’s Eyes": in Twilight Zone Magazine, June 1988; and The Sterling Web, winter 1991.
- "The House Under the Street" AKA "A World Without Toys": in Upstate October 26, 1986; Shadows #10, 1987; The Year's Best Fantasy: First Annual Collection, 1988; Demons and Dreams, 1989.
- "Circularity": in Cemetery Dance #37, 2002.
- "The Marybell Women": in Cemetery Dance #47, 2003.
- "The Screamers at the Window," in Shivers IV (anthology), Cemetery Dance, 2006.
- "Murder Victim": in Midnight Premiere (anthology), Cemetery Dance, 2007.
- "Rainy Day People": in Postscripts #10, 2007.
- "Fog Boy": in Darkness on the Edge: Tales Inspired by the Songs of Bruce Springsteen (anthology), PS Publishing, 2010.
- "A Moment at the House": in Postscripts #24–25 (2011)

=== Anthologies ===
- Bone Soup (a collection of short stories, art, and poems, including a revised version of the novel Cold House) (Cemetery Dance Publications)
