= Thomas Sullivan (author) =

American novelist

Thomas Sullivan (b. November 20, 1940) is the author of some eighty short stories and novels.

His work involves characters in intensely psychological situations that range from thrillers (The Water Wolf) to comedy (The Phases of Harry Moon). Awards and recognitions are for literary and genre fiction. He has lived in Lathrup Village, Michigan.

His 1988 novel The Phases of Harry Moon received a Pulitzer Prize nomination.

== Selected novels ==
- Diapason (1978)
- The Phases of Harry Moon (1988)
- Born Burning (1989)
- The Martyring (1998)
- Dust of Eden (2004)
- Second Soul (2005)
- The Water Wolf (2006)
- Case White (2017)

== Awards, honors and prizes ==
=== Nominations include ===
- Nebula Award nomination for The Fence, 1987.
- A finalist for the 1999 World Fantasy Award for Best Novel for The Martyring.

== Listed in ==
He is listed in:

- Who's Who of International Authors and Writers
- Men of Distinction
- Contemporary Authors
- Men of Achievement
- Dictionary of International Biography
- Michigan Authors
