= Charles L. Grant =

American novelist

- Born: September 12, 1942; Newark, New Jersey
- Died: September 15, 2006 (aged 64)
- Citizenship: U.S.
- Education: Trinity College, Hartford
- Occupation: Novelist
- Children: Ian Grant and Emily (Grant) Stalnaker
- Writing career
- Pen name: Geoffrey Marsh, Lionel Fenn, Simon Lake, Felicia Andrews, Deborah Lewis, Steven Charles, Mark Rivers, Timothy Boggs
- Genres: Horror, dark fantasy, science fiction
- Notable awards: World Fantasy Award; Nebula Award

Charles Lewis Grant (September 12, 1942 – September 15, 2006) was an American novelist and short story writer specializing in what he called "dark fantasy" and "quiet horror". He also wrote under the pseudonyms of Geoffrey Marsh, Lionel Fenn, Simon Lake, Felicia Andrews, Deborah Lewis, Timothy Boggs, Mark Rivers, and Steven Charles. He received the Bram Stoker Award for Lifetime Achievement in 1999 and was selected as World Horror Grand Master in 2002. He received the British Fantasy Society's Special Award for life achievement in 1987.

== Biography ==
=== Early life ===
Charles L. Grant was born in Newark, New Jersey. He received a Bachelor of Arts from Trinity College in Hartford, Connecticut, in 1964, and taught for four years. Then, from 1968 to 1970, Grant served in the U.S. Army military police in Vietnam and was awarded a Bronze Star.

=== Career ===
From 1973 to 1977, Grant was Secretary of Science Fiction Writers of America. In 1987–1988, he served as President of the Horror Writers Association.

Grant won three World Fantasy Awards: the 1979 Anthology award for Shadows, the 1983 Anthology award for Nightmare Seasons, and a tie in the 1983 Novella category for "Confess the Seasons" in Perpetual Light. He received a total of 23 nominations for World Fantasy Awards.

He won a Nebula Award in 1976 for his short story "A Crowd of Shadows", and another Nebula Award in 1978 for his novella A Glow of Candles, a Unicorn's Eye, the latter telling of an actor's dilemma in a post-literate future. Grant also edited over twenty anthologies, including the award-winning Shadows anthology series which ran eleven volumes from 1978 to 1991. Contributors include Stephen King, Ramsey Campbell, Al Sarrantonio, R. A. Lafferty, Avram Davidson, and Steve Rasnic Tem and Melanie Tem. His story "Temperature Days on Hawthorne Street" was adapted into an episode of Tales from the Darkside titled "The Milkman Cometh" in 1987, the same year he wrote the Introduction and Afterward to Tor Books' publication of Washington Irving's The Legend of Sleepy Hollow, Grant's favorite Irving story.

Grant wrote twelve books (eight novels and four collections of four related novellas each, with interstitial material) set in the fictional Connecticut town of Oxrun Station. Three of these were intentionally pastiches of classic Universal and Hammer horror films, and feature a vampire, a werewolf, and an animated mummy.

=== Personal life ===
Grant's first wife is Debbie Voss, with whom he had two children, Ian Matthew and Emily Kathryn. Ian has two sons Payton and Logan; Emily has three children, sons Aaron and William, and daughter, Ella. In February, 1982, Grant married writer and editor Kathryn Ptacek.

=== Death ===
Suffering ill health in his later years, Grant died on September 15, 2006, from a heart attack.

== Critical reception ==
Stephen King expressed admiration for Grant's work, stating that Grant was "One of the premier horror writers of his or any generation". This quote was usually placed on the front of Grant's books. Discussing Grant's fiction, Jess Nevins said that "Grant excelled at building foreboding atmosphere and mounting dramatic tension, at characterization and pacing." The Encyclopedia of Fantasy wrote that Grant crafted "subtle, atmospheric works that eschew overt violence in favour of the powerful terrors of the imagination" and that "his careful utilization of language and manipulation of mood" is perhaps best displayed in shorter works.

== Bibliography ==
=== Horror novels ===
- Oxrun Station
  - The Hour of the Oxrun Dead (1978)
  - The Sound of Midnight (1979)
  - The Last Call of Mourning (1979)
  - The Grave (1981)
  - The Bloodwind (1982)
  - The Soft Whisper of the Dead (1982)
  - The Dark Cry of the Moon (1986)
  - The Long Night of the Grave (1986)
- Other
  - The Curse (1977)
  - The Nestling (1982)
  - Night Songs (1984)
  - The Tea Party (1985)
  - The Pet (1986)
  - For Fear of the Night (1988)
  - In A Dark Dream (1989)
  - Stunts (1990)
  - Fire Mask (1991) - for Young Adults
  - Something Stirs (1991)
  - Raven (1993)
  - Jackals (1994)
  - X-Files: Goblins (1994)
  - X-Files: Whirlwind (1995)
  - Millennium Quartet #1: Symphony (1997)
  - Watcher (World of Darkness) (1997)
  - Millennium Quartet #2: In The Mood (1998)
  - Black Oak: Genesis (1998)
  - Black Oak: The Hush of Dark Wings (1998)
  - Millennium Quartet #3: Chariot (1999)
  - Black Oak: Winter Knight (1999)
  - Millennium Quartet #4: Riders in the Sky (1999)
  - Black Oak: Hunting Ground (2000)
  - Black Oak: When the Cold Wind Blows (2001)

=== Science fiction ===
- The Shadow of Alpha (1976)
- Ascension (1977)
- Ravens of the Moon (1978)
- Legion (1979)
- A Quiet Night of Fear (1981)

=== As "Geoffrey Marsh" ===
- Lincoln Blackthorne series
  - The King of Satan's Eyes (1985)
  - The Tail of the Arabian Knight (1986)
  - The Patch of the Odin Soldier (1987)
  - The Fangs of the Hooded Demon (1988)
- Hudson Hawk (novelization) (1991)

=== As "Lionel Fenn" ===
- The Seven Spears of the W'dch'ck (1988)
- The Kent Montana series
  - Kent Montana and the Really Ugly Thing From Mars (1990)
  - Kent Montana and the Reasonably Invisible Man (1991)
  - Kent Montana and the Once and Future Thing (1991)
  - Mark of the Moderately Vicious Vampire (1992)
  - 668, the Neighbor of the Beast (1992)
- The Quest For The White Duck series
  - Blood River Down (1986)
  - Web of Defeat (1987)
  - Agnes Day (1987)
- Diego series
  - Once Upon A Time in the East (1993)
  - By The Time I Get To Nashville (1994)
  - Time, The Semi-Final Frontier (1994)

=== As "Simon Lake" ===
- Midnight Palace series
  - Daughter of Darkness (1992)
  - Something's Watching (1993)
  - Death Cycle (1993)
  - He Told Me To (1993)

=== As "Mark Rivers" ===
- Taggard Point Series
  - The Forever House (1995)
  - Shapes (1995)
  - Death Scream (1995)
  - The Clown (1995)

=== As "Timothy Boggs" ===
- Hercules TV Tie-in Novels
  - Serpent's Shadow (1996)
  - Eye of the Ram (1997)
  - By the Sword (1999)

=== As "Felicia Andrews" ===
- Riverrun (1979)
- Riverwitch (1979)
- Mountainwitch (1980)
- Moonwitch (1980)
- Seacliffe (1984)
- Silver Huntress (1984)
- The Velvet Hart (1985)

=== As "Deborah Lewis" ===
- Voices Out of Time (1977)
- Eve of the Hound (1977)
- Kirkwood Fires (1978)
- The Wind At Winter's End (1979)

=== As "Steven Charles" ===
- Private School series
  - Nightmare Session (1986)
  - Academy of Terror (1986)
  - Witch's Eye (1986)
  - Skeleton Key (1986)
  - The Enemy Within (1987)
  - The Last Alien (1987)

=== Anthologies edited ===
==== Greystone Bay series ====
- The First Chronicles of Greystone Bay (1985)
- Doom City (1987)
- The SeaHarp Hotel (1990)
- In the Fog (1994)

==== Shadows series ====
- Shadows (1978)
- Shadows 2 (1979)
- Shadows 3 (1980)
- Shadows 4 (1981)
- Shadows 5 (1982)
- Shadows 6 (1983)
- Shadows 7 (1984)
- Shadows 8 (1985)
- Shadows 9 (1986)
- Shadows 10 (1987)
- The Best of Shadows (1988)
- Final Shadows (1991)

==== Other anthologies ====
- Nightmares (1979)
- Horrors (1981)
- Terrors (1982)
- Gallery of Horror (1983)
- Fears (1983)
- Midnight (1985)
- Night Visions 2 (1985)
- After Midnight (1986)
- Gothic Ghosts (1997) Edited with Wendy Webb

=== Non-fiction ===
- Writing and Selling Science Fiction (1976)

=== Collections ===
- Tales from the Nightside (1981) (includes stories set in Oxrun Station)
- A Glow of Candles and Other Stories (1981)
- Nightmare Seasons (1982)^{+}
- Night Visions #1 (1984)
- Black Wine (1986)
- The Orchard (1986)^{+}
- Dialing The Wind (1989)^{+}
- The Black Carousel (1995)^{+}
- Scream Quietly: The Best of Charles L. Grant (2011) edited by Stephen Jones

=== Notes ===
- ^* Novels set in the author's fictional town of Oxrun Station
- ^+ Linked novellas set in the author's fictional town of Oxrun Station

== Short fiction ==
- "The House of Evil" (1968) F&SF, Dec
- "Afternoon of the Banjo" (1971) The Little Magazine, Spr
- "The Summer of the Irish Sea" (1972) Orbit 11, ed. Damon Knight
- "Come Dance with Me on My Pony’s Grave" (1973) F&SF, Jul
- "Abdication" (1973) Amazing Stories, Oct
- "But the Other Old Man Stopped Playing" (1973) Fantastic, Apr
- "The Magic Child" (1973) Frontiers 2: The New Mind, ed. Roger Elwood
- "Weep No More, Old Lady" (1973) Future Quest, ed. Roger Elwood
- "The Key to English" (1974) F&SF, May
- "Everybody a Winner, the Barker Cried" (1974) Orbit 13, ed. Damon Knight
- "Temperature Days on Hawthorne Street" (1974) The Little Magazine, Spr
- "The Rest Is Silence" (1974) F&SF, Sep
- "White Wolf Calling" (1975) F&SF, Apr
- "The Three of Tens" (1975) F&SF, Dec
- "To Be a Witch, in Three-Quarter Time" (1975) Fantastic, Feb
- "Then Two or Three Are Gathered" (1975) Amazing, Mar
- "In Donovan’s Time" (1975) Orbit 16, ed. Damon Knight
- "Seven is a Birdsong" (1976) Analog, Jan
- "A Crowd of Shadows" (1976) F&SF, Jun
- "From All the Fields of Hail and Fire" (1976) Midnight Sun #4
- "Through All His Blood Runs Shadow" (1976) Midnight Sun #4
- "Red River Lies Drowning" (1977) Fantastic, Feb
- "The Shape of Plowshares" (1977) Analog, Mar
- "Treatise on the Artifacts of a Civilization" (1977) Antæus #25
- "When All the Children Call My Name" (1977) The Year's Best Horror Stories: Series V, ed. Gerald W. Page
- "The Dark of Legends, The Light of Lies" (1977) Chrysalis, ed. Roy Torgeson
- "Eldorado" (1977) The Arts and Beyond, ed. Thomas F. Monteleone
- "A Glow of Candles, A Unicorn’s Eye" (1977) Graven Images, ed. Edward L. Ferman & Barry N. Malzberg
- "Gently Rapping" (1977) Galaxy, Sep
- "Knock, and See What Enters" (1977) Fantastic, Dec
- "Hear Me Now, My Sweet Abbey Rose" (1978) F&SF, Mar
- "If Damon Comes" (1978) The Year's Best Horror Stories: Series VI, ed. Gerald W. Page
- "Caesar, Now Be Still" (1978) F&SF, Sep
- "View, with a Difference" (1978) Dark Sins, Dark Dreams, ed. Barry N. Malzberg & Bill Pronzini
- "The Peace That Passes Never" (1978) Chrysalis 3, ed. Roy Torgeson
- "When Dark Descends [with Thomas F. Monteleone]" (1979) Chrysalis 4, ed. Roy Torgeson
- "Benny, Kind and Gentle" (1979) Weirdbook #14
- "Needle Song" (1979) Midnight Sun #5
- "What More Remains" (1979) Midnight Sun #5
- "The Fourth Musketeer" (1979) Whispers II, ed. Stuart David Schiff
- "Love-Starved" (1979) F&SF, Aug
- "And Weary of the Sun" (1979) Chrysalis 5, ed. Roy Torgeson
- "The Last Ambition" (1979) Whispers #13-14, Oct
- "Secrets of the Heart" (1980) F&SF, Mar
- "A Garden of Blackred Roses" (1980) Dark Forces, ed. Kirby McCauley
- "Across the Water to Skye" (1980) New Terrors #2, ed. Ramsey Campbell
- "The Other Room" (1980) Mummy!, ed. Bill Pronzini
- "In Silvered Shadows Are Born the Screams" (1980) Shayol #4
- "Every Time You Say I Love You" (1981) F&SF, May
- "The Residents" (1981) Fantasy Newsletter #37
- "Silver" (1981) Twilight Zone Magazine, July
- "Quietly Now" (1981) The Arbor House Necropolis, ed. Bill Pronzini
- "Coin of the Realm" (1981) Tales from the Nightside, by Charles L. Grant
- "Old Friends" (1981) Tales from the Nightside, by Charles L. Grant
- "Home" (1981) Tales from the Nightside, by Charles L. Grant
- "A Night of Dark Intent" (1981) Tales from the Nightside, by Charles L. Grant
- "The Gentle Passing of a Hand" (1981) Tales from the Nightside, by Charles L. Grant
- "Something There Is" (1981) Tales from the Nightside, by Charles L. Grant
- "Digging" (1981) Tales from the Nightside, by Charles L. Grant
- "Essence of Charlotte" (1982) Twilight Zone Feb 1982
- "What in Solemn Silence" (1982) Asimov's, Mar
- "Prologue" (1982) Nightmare Seasons, by Charles L. Grant
- "Thou Need Not Fear My Kisses, Love" (1982) Nightmare Seasons, by Charles L. Grant
- "Now There Comes a Darker Day" (1982) Nightmare Seasons, by Charles L. Grant
- "Night’s Swift Dragons" (1982) Nightmare Seasons, by Charles L. Grant
- "The Color of Joy" (1982) Nightmare Seasons, by Charles L. Grant
- "Epilogue" (1982) Nightmare Seasons, by Charles L. Grant
- "Pride" (1982) F&SF, May
- "The Wind of Lost Migration" (1982) Amazing, Jun
- "From a Single Word" (1982) Fantasy Book, Aug
- "Confess the Seasons" (1982) Perpetual Light, ed. Alan Ryan
- "The Next Name You Hear" (1983) F&SF, Jan
- "Recollections of Annie" (1983) Twilight Zone, Feb
- "I Never Could Say Goodbye" (1983) Whispers IV, ed. Stuart David Schiff
- "When I Grow Up" (1983) Whispers #19-20, October
- "Let No One Weep for Poor Sally Karnes" (1983) Whispers #19-20, October
- "Are You Afraid of the Dark?" (1984) Fantasycon IX Programme
- "A Voice Not Heard" (1984) Asimov's, Sept
- "The Old Men Know" (1984) Masques #1, ed. J. N. Williamson
- "The Generation Waltz" (1984) Fantasy Tales #13
- "Friends in Dark Places" (1984) Night Visions 1, ed. Alan Ryan
- "Family" (1984) Night Visions 1, ed. Alan Ryan
- "What Are Deaths For 1984) Night Visions 1, ed. Alan Ryan
- "Poor Thing" (1984) Night Visions 1, ed. Alan Ryan
- "To Laugh with You, Dear" (1984) Night Visions 1, ed. Alan Ryan
- "In the Blood" (1984) Night Visions 1, ed. Alan Ryan
- "And We’ll Be Jolly Friends" (1984) Night Visions 1, ed. Alan Ryan
- "The Card" (1984) Random Access Messages of the Computer Age, ed. Thomas F. Monteleone
- "Myra" (1985) Fantasy Macabre #6
- "Penny Daye" (1985) Fantasycon X Programme
- "The Children, They Laugh So Sweetly" (1985) F&SF, Oct
- "Prologue" (1985) Greystone Bay, ed. Charles L. Grant
- "Andrew Patterson" (1985) Eldritch Tales #11
- "Give Us a Big Smile" (1985) Twilight Zone, Dec
- "The Price of a Toy" (1986) Twilight Zone, Apr
- "Long Walk Home" (1986) Fantasy Tales #15
- "An Image in Twisted Silver" (1986) World Fantasy Convention Program Book
- "Crystal" (1986) F&SF, Aug
- "Eyes" (1986) Halloween Horrors, ed. Alan Ryan
- "Out There" (1986) Cutting Edge, ed. Dennis Etchison
- "Prologue" (1986) The Orchard, by Charles L. Grant
- "My Mary's Asleep" (1986) The Orchard, by Charles L. Grant
- "I See Her Sweet and Fair" (1986) The Orchard, by Charles L. Grant
- "The Last and Dreadful Hour" (1986) The Orchard, by Charles L. Grant
- "Screaming, In the Dark" (1986) The Orchard, by Charles L. Grant
- "Epilogue" (1986) The Orchard, by Charles L. Grant
- "The Sheeted Dead" (1987) In the Field of Fire, ed. Jeanne Van Buren Dann & Jack M. Dann
- "Listen to the Music in My Hands" (1987) Twilight Zone, Feb
- "One Spring in Wyoming" (1987) Aboriginal SF, Feb/Mar
- "This Old Man" (1987) Night Cry, Spring
- "Everything to Live For" (1987) Whispers VI, ed. Stuart David Schiff
- "Constant Father" (1987) A Southern Fantasy, ed. Ron & Val Lakey Lindahn
- "Ellen, in Her Time" (1987) The Architecture of Fear, ed. Kathryn Cramer & Peter D. Pautz
- "Last Night, in the Kitchen" (1988) Twilight Zone, Jun
- "Spinning Tales with the Dead" (1988) Prime Evil, ed. Douglas E. Winter
- "Now and Again in Summer" (1988) Fantasy Tales, v.10 #1
- "My Shadow is the Fog" (1988) Ripper! ed. Gardner Dozois & Susan Casper
- "City Boy" (1988) F&SF, Oct
- "Snowman" (1988) Gaslight & Ghosts, ed. Stephen Jones & Jo Fletcher
- "The Last Cowboy Song" (1989) Post Mortem: New Tales of Ghastly Horror, ed. Paul F. Olson & David B. Silva
- "By the Sea" (1989) Scare Care, ed. Graham Masterton
- "Prologue" (1989) Dialing the Wind, by Charles L. Grant
- "Dialing the Wind" (1989) Dialing the Wind, by Charles L. Grant
- "The Sweetest Kiss" (1989) Dialing the Wind, by Charles L. Grant
- "As We Promise, Side by Side" (1989) Dialing the Wind, by Charles L. Grant
- "The Chariot Dark and Low" (1989) Dialing the Wind, by Charles L. Grant
- "Epilogue" (1989) Dialing the Wind, by Charles L. Grant
- "Alice Smiling" (1990) Fantasy Tales v11 #4
- "Alexandra" (1990) Borderlands, ed. Thomas F. Monteleone
- "Pinto Rider" (1990) When the Black Lotus Blooms, ed. Elizabeth A. Saunders
- "Kin" (1991) Psycho-Paths, ed. Robert Bloch
- "Girl of My Dreams" (1991) Obsessions, ed. Gary Raisor
- "Peacemaker" (1991) Borderlands 2, ed. Thomas F. Monteleone
- "Make a Wish Upon the Moon" (1991) Dead End: City Limits, ed. Paul F. Olson & David B. Silva
- "One Life, in an Hourglass" (1991) The Bradbury Chronicles, ed. William F. Nolan & Martin H. Greenberg
- "The Awful Truth in Arthur's Barrow" (1992) Grails: Quests, Visitations and Other Occurrences, ed. Richard Gilliam, Martin H. Greenberg & Edward E. Kramer
- "The Alien Visitor, Probably from Someplace Else" (1993) Tomorrow Speculative Fiction, Jan
- "Sons" (1993) Confederacy of the Dead, ed. Richard Gilliam, Martin H. Greenberg & Edward E. Kramer
- "In the Still, Small Hours" (1993) Deathport, ed. Ramsey Campbell
- "Josie, In the Fog" (1993) In the Fog, ed. Charles L. Grant
- "The Dead Speaketh Not, They Just Grunt Now and Then" (1993) The Ultimate Zombie ed. John Betancourt & Byron Preiss
- "Name That Tune" (1993) Monsters in Our Midst, ed. Robert Bloch
- "Holding Hands" (1993) Touch Wood, ed. Peter Crowther
- "The Mask of Truth Has Many Holes" (1993) Cemetery Dance #15, Winter
- "After You’ve Gone" (1994) Phobias, ed. Wendy Webb, Richard Gilliam, Edward E. Kramer & Martin H. Greenberg
- "Sometimes, in the Rain" (1994) Northern Frights 2, ed. Don Hutchison
- "Always, in the Dark" (1994) Return to the Twilight Zone, ed. Carol Serling & Martin H. Greenberg
- "Prologue" (1995) The Black Carousel, by Charles L. Grant
- "Penny Tunes for a Gold Lion" (1995) The Black Carousel, by Charles L. Grant
- "Will You Be Mine?" (1995) The Black Carousel, by Charles L. Grant
- "Lost in Amber Light" (1995) The Black Carousel, by Charles L. Grant
- "The Rain is Filled with Ghosts Tonight" (1995) The Black Carousel, by Charles L. Grant
- "Epilogue" (1995) The Black Carousel, by Charles L. Grant
- "Gray" (1995) Dark Destiny: Proprietors of Fate, ed. Edward E. Kramer
- "Riding the Black" (1997) Revelations, ed. Douglas E. Winter
- "Haunted" (1997) Psychos, ed. Robert Bloch
- "The Soft Sound of Wings" (1998) In the Shadow of the Gargoyle, ed. Nancy Kilpatrick & Thomas S. Roche
- "Cody" (1999) Horror at Halloween, ed. Stephen Jones & Jo Fletcher
- "Whose Ghosts These Are" (2001) The Museum of Horror, ed. Dennis Etchison
- "For My Birthday, Another Candle" (2003) 13 Horrors, ed. Brian A. Hopkins
- "Brownie and Me" (2003) The Dark: New Ghost Stories, ed. Ellen Datlow
- "Friday Night at the Wicked Swan" (2005) Taverns of the Dead, ed. Kealan Patrick Burke

== See also ==
- List of horror fiction authors
