= Mark Polonia =

Independent American B movie filmmaker

- Born: September 30, 1968 (age 58); Wellsboro, Pennsylvania, United States
- Other name: Mark A. Polonia
- Occupation: Film Director
- Years active: 1986-Present
- Employer: Commonwealth University
- Known for: Feeders
- Spouse: Maria Davis
- Relatives: John Polonia (brother)

Mark Polonia (born September 30, 1968) is an independent American B movie filmmaker from Wellsboro, Pennsylvania, United States, with over 100 director credits. He is married to actress Maria Davis.

Polonia shoots most of his films as shot-on-video films and works mostly in the horror and science fiction genres. In recent years, he has become somewhat of a low-budget and even no-budget cult icon for the likes of Cocaine Shark, Feeders, Splatter Farm and Sharkula.

Film Threat once stated that "Mark Polonia is best known (if he is at all) for his ridiculous, though insanely fun, output such as Shark Encounters Of The Third Kind and Deadly Playthings. These productions intentionally trade on their low-budget schtick with absurd premises that ask the viewer to laugh and have fun, as the movie is in on the joke." Horror and Sons once wrote that Polonia's films looked as if they were filmed for "less than a house."

Critics frequently cite his films as "gutter trash" or "so bad it's good," noting amateur acting, poor lighting, and padding.

== Career ==
=== Polonia Brothers (1986–2009) ===
Mark, along with his twin brother John (who were the youngest of five siblings) fell in love with film at an early age and decided to begin making movies together, founding Polonia Brothers Entertainment together in 1986. Their first commercial release was the cult classic film Splatter Farm which was released on VHS by Donna Michele Productions in 1987. Mark and John directed, wrote, starred in and filmed the entire feature themselves, with help from a teenage friend. The brothers were only 19 at the time.

In 2007, Splatter Farm was released on DVD as a new and improved cut by Camp Motion Pictures. Though this new version was missing many of the scenes that had made the film such a cult hit to begin with.

Mark and his brother continued making microbudget horrors together, with their 1996 alien film Feeders, starring fellow B-movie maker Jon McBride (Cannibal Campout) being picked up by Blockbuster in the aftermath of the commercial success of Independence Day, and later becoming Blockbuster's No. 1 independent-film rental for the year. McBride would soon begin working with the twins regularly on many of their projects.

The duo released around another 20 films following the success of Feeders before coming to a halt after the sudden death of John Polonia at the age of 39. In honour of John's memory, Mark and Cinegraphic Productions released Halloweenight, based on a screenplay by, and dedicated to the memory of, John, in October 2009.

=== Solo career (2011-Present) ===
Mark would take a short hiatus from making films, before returning in 2011. He would quickly gain a reputation as a "bottom of the barrel" filmmaker with films like Sharkenstein, Noah's Shark, Feeders 2, Cocaine Shark, Church of the Damned and Monster Movie. Perhaps his biggest success in recent years, has been the Camp Blood film series.

During this time Polonia's films would become a regular presence with multiple different distribution studios, including Camp Motion Pictures, Sterling Pictures and Eye Wide Releasing.

== Teaching ==
Polonia teaches audio/visual production at Commonwealth University.

== Reception ==
The majority of his films sit in the 2.0 star section on IMDb. Numerous independent aggregators and reviewers have been openly critical of his modern films, like Cocaine Werewolf, feature "wooden acting," "terrible visual effects," and scripts that "make no sense".

Some have compared his marketing style similar to The Asylum, using knock-off movie titles to capitalise on bigger films (for example the aforementioned Cocaine Shark was named so to ride the success of 2023's Cocaine Bear).

ScreenAnarchy described Polonia's "no budget brand of filmmaking" as "easy to ignore, hard to forget".

== Filmography ==
=== Director ===
- 1985: Church of the Damned
- 1986: Hallucinations
- 1986: Splatter Farm
- 1991: Lethal Nightmare
- 1993: How to slay a Vampire
- 1994: Saurians
- 1996: Feeders
- 1996: Night Crawlers
- 1998: Terror House
- 1998: Feeders 2: Slay Bells
- 1998: Mad Magic
- 2000: The House That Screamed
- 2000: Blood Red Planet
- 2001: Dweller
- 2001: Hellgate: The House That Screamed 2
- 2002: Gorilla Warfare: Battle of the Apes
- 2002: Nighthirst
- 2003: Holla If I Kill You
- 2003: Hellspawn
- 2004: Among Us
- 2004: Peter Rottentail
- 2004: Dinosaur Chronicles (re-released 2004 in Galaxy of Terror 4-Pack)
- 2005: Razorteeth
- 2005: Black Mass
- 2007: Splatter Beach
- 2007: Wildcat
- 2008: Forest Primeval
- 2008: Monster Movie
- 2009: Halloweenight
- 2011: E.V.E of Destruction
- 2013: Empire of the Apes
- 2013: Chainsaw Killer
- 2014: Camp Blood First Slaughter
- 2015: Amityville Death House
- 2015: Channel 13
- 2015: Jurassic Prey
- 2015: Death Reel
- 2016: Bigfoot vs Zombies
- 2016: Sharkenstein
- 2017: Amityville Exorcism
- 2017: Nightmare Vacation
- 2017: Land Shark
- 2017: Revolt of the Empire of the Apes
- 2017: It Kills
- 2018: Battle Bots
- 2018: Ghost of Camp Blood
- 2018: War Raiders
- 2018: Frozen Sasquash
- 2018: Alien Surveillance
- 2019: Camp Blood Kills
- 2019: Deadly Playthings
- 2019: Bride of the Werewolf
- 2020: Amityville Island
- 2020: Shark Encounters of the Third Kind
- 2020: Return to Splatter Farm
- 2020: Children of Camp Blood
- 2021: Virus Shark
- 2021: Invasion of the Empire of the Apes
- 2021: Dune World
- 2021: Camp Murder
- 2021: Jurassic Shark 2: Aquapocalpyse
- 2021: Noah's Shark
- 2021: Hell on a Shelf
- 2021: Sister Krampus
- 2022: R.I.P Van Winkle
- 2022: Reel Monsters
- 2022: House Squash
- 2022: Feeders 3: The Final Meal
- 2022: Sharkula
- 2022: Amityville in Space
- 2022: Doll Shark
- 2023: Motorboat
- 2023: R.I.P Van Winkle Part 2
- 2023: R.I.P Van Winkle Part 3
- 2023: Cocaine Shark
- 2023: Snow Babes
- 2023: Jurassic Shark 3: Seavenge
- 2023: Yule Logs
- 2023: Revenge of the Empire of the Apes
- 2024: Cocaine Werewolf
- 2024: Teddiscare
- 2024: Pandasaurus
- 2024: The Last Chainsaw Massacre
- 2024: Once Upon a Time in Amityville
- 2024: Jurassic Exorist
- 2024: One Million Babes BC
- 2024: The Girl who wore Yellow Lace
- 2024: Camp Blood: Clown Shark
- 2024: Mummy Shark
- 2024: The Stalking
- 2025: Harvest of Eyes
- 2025: Trail Cam Sasquash
- 2025: The Final Possession
- 2025: Battle Beyond Mars
- 2025: Four Nights in Fear Forest
- 2025: Robocidal
- 2025: Cape Cod Cthulhu
- 2026: Your All Doomed
- 2026: Dummy
- 2026: Amityville Rex
- 2026: Shocktopus
- 2026: Camp Blood Legacy
