= Cocaine Werewolf =

- Directed by: Mark Polonia
- Written by: Ford Austin; Tyger Torrez
- Starring: Brice Kennedy; Yolie Canales; James Carolus
- Production companies: Cleopatra Entertainment; Sterling Entertainment
- Distributed by: Cleopatra Entertainment
- Release date: July 5, 2024 (United States)
- Running time: 80 minutes
- Country: United States
- Language: English

Cocaine Werewolf is a 2024 American comedy horror film directed by and starring Mark Polonia.

== Synopsis ==
A Wall Street business exec on his way back to Manhattan is wounded by a vicious werewolf. Out in the middle of nowhere, all he has on him is a couple of bags of cocaine. The wound is causing him to hallucinate, and things about him begin to change. Once he snorts himself a few lines, he turns into a werewolf himself, leaving a trail of bodies behind him. A film crew is shooting out in the northern woods of Pennsylvania when they bring in the man to help. However, they’re in for the fight of their lives when he overindulges in the white powder, once again transforming him into a blood-thirsty beast.

== Cast ==
- Mark Polonia
- Brice Kennedy
- Yolie Canales
- Marie DeLorenzo
- Timothy Hatch
- Titus Himmelberger
- James Kelly
- Jeff Kirkendall
- Noyes J. Lawton

== Release ==
=== Theatrical ===
The U.S. theatrical premiere was on July 5, 2024, at the historic Arcadia Theatre in downtown Wellsboro.

=== Home media ===
The official release date for the Home Entertainment Blu Ray and DVD versions is on August 13 2024, followed by a VOD and Cable TV release this coming November 2024.

== See also ==
- Cocaine Bear
- Cocaine Shark
- Cocaine Crabs from Outer Space
- Methgator
