= List of drug films =

Drug films are films that depict either illicit drug distribution or drug use, whether as a major theme, such as by centering the film around drug subculture or by depicting it in a few memorable scenes. Drug cinema ranges from gritty social realism depictions to the utterly surreal depictions in art film and experimental film.

Some filmmakers create unabashedly pro- or anti-drug works, while others are less judgmental, allowing the viewer to draw their own conclusions. Drugs commonly shown in such films include cocaine, heroin and other opioids, LSD, cannabis (see stoner film) and methamphetamine.

There is extensive overlap with crime films, which sometimes treat drugs as plot devices to keep the action moving.

The following is a partial list of drug films and the substances involved.

== 0–9 ==
- 1. Mai – Helden bei der Arbeit (2008) – MDMA
- 10 to Midnight (1983) – cannabis
- 21 Grams (2003) – cocaine
- 21 Jump Street (2012) – HFS (a fictional drug), cannabis
- 22 Jump Street (2014) – WHYPHY (a fictional drug)
- 24 Hour Party People (2002) – MDMA, cocaine, heroin, methadone, cannabis, and a mention of the large amount of crack cocaine in Barbados
- 25th Hour (2002) – heroin, MDMA
- 28 Days (2000) – prescription drugs, heroin, and alcohol
- 28 Days Later (2002) – prescription drugs, including Valium
- 30 Minutes or Less (2011) – cannabis
- The 40-Year-Old Virgin (2005) – cannabis
- 50/50 (2011) – cannabis
- The 51st State (2001) – POS 51 (a fictional drug); mentions cocaine, LSD, and MDMA
- 54 (1998) – cannabis, cocaine, MDMA, and quaaludes
- 8 Mile (2002) - cannabis
- 9 (2009) – Magnet (a fictional drug), used by 8 which causes a drug-like effect
- 99 Francs (2007) – cannabis and cocaine

== A ==
- A Street Cat Named Bob (2016) – heroin, methadone, and cannabis
- The Acid House (1998) – LSD, cannabis, and poppers
- Across the Universe (2007) – LSD, cannabis, and some opiate, presumably morphine
- Acts of Worship (2001) – heroin and crack cocaine
- Adam & Paul (2003) – heroin and cannabis
- Adaptation (2002) – fictional version of ghost orchid powder
- Adulthood (2008) – cannabis and cocaine
- Adventureland (2009) – cannabis
- Air America (1990) – heroin and opium
- Airplane! (1980) – cocaine, glue, and amphetamine
- Alice in Acidland (1969) – LSD
- Alice's Restaurant (1969) – heroin
- Alice (1988) – Amanita muscaria
- Almost Famous (2000) – cannabis, Vicodin, LSD, and quaaludes
- Alpha Dog (2007) – cannabis
- Altered States (1980) – cannabis, Amanita muscaria, LSD, DMT, and psilocybin
- American Beauty (1999) – cannabis
- American Cowslip (2009) – heroin
- American Gangster (2007) – heroin and cocaine
- American Made (2017) – cocaine
- American Psycho (2000) – cocaine, Halcion, Xanax, ecstasy, and cannabis
- American Ultra (2015) – cannabis
- American Virgin (2009) – cannabis and unspecified drugs
- Amores Perros (2001) – cocaine
- Analyze That (2002) – cocaine
- Animal Kingdom (2010) – cannabis, cocaine, and heroin
- The Anniversary Party (2001) – MDMA
- Annie Hall (1977) – cocaine
- Another Day in Paradise (1997) – heroin, references to morphine, Adderall, methamphetamine, and cocaine
- Another Happy Day (2011) – fentanyl
- Apocalypse Now (1979) – cannabis, LSD, and opium
- Around the Fire (1999) – cannabis, and LSD
- Arrebato (1979) – heroin, cocaine, and amyl nitrite
- Assassin of Youth (1937) – cannabis
- The Astrid Experience (2023) – MDMA and unspecified drugs
- At Close Range (1986) – cannabis, pills, amphetamines
- Atlantic City (1980) – cocaine
- Attack the Block (2011) – cannabis, crack/cocaine
- Attack of the Meth Gator (2023) - methamphetamine
- Avenging Disco Godfather (1979) – PCP
- Awakening of the Beast (1970, aka O Ritual dos Sádicos and O Despertar da Besta) – LSD
- Awaydays (2009) – cocaine, cannabis, and heroin

== B ==
- Babel (2006) – MDMA and opium
- Bad Batch (2010) – cannabis, cocaine
- Bad Boys (1995) – heroin
- Bad Boys II (2003) – MDMA and heroin
- Bad Lieutenant (1992) – crack, cocaine, heroin and cannabis
- Bad Moms (2016) – cannabis
- Bad Santa 2 (2016) - Rohypnol
- Bad Teacher (2011) – cannabis, ecstasy, GHB
- The Ballad of Little Jo (1993) – opium
- Bang Boom Bang (1999) – cannabis
- Bangkok Hilton (1989) – heroin
- Basic Instinct (1992) – cocaine
- The Basketball Diaries (1995) – heroin, cocaine, cannabis, solvents and various pills
- The Batman (2022) - fictional drug known as "drops"
- Batman Begins (2005) – a fictional hallucinogenic gas
- Be.Angeled (2001) – cocaine, MDMA, cannabis
- The Beach (2000) – cannabis, psychedelic mushrooms, stimulants
- The Beach Girls (1982) – cannabis, unidentified pills
- Beautiful Boy (2018) – cannabis, crystal meth, heroin, alcohol
- Beavis and Butt-Head Do America (1996) – peyote
- Beerfest (2006) – cannabis
- Before the Devil Knows You're Dead (2007) – heroin, cocaine
- Before I Disappear (2014) – heroin, pills
- Belly (1998) – heroin, cannabis
- Berkeley in the Sixties (1990)
- Berlin Calling (2008) – cocaine, MDMA, MDA, PMA, ketamine, cannabis; mentions LSD and methamphetamine
- Better Living Through Chemistry (2014) – pharmaceutical mixing and abuse
- La Beuze (2003) – chemical cannabis made by Nazis during WWII which gives users hallucinations of football players
- Beyond the Valley of the Dolls (1970) – cannabis, LSD, prescription pills, MDMA, peyote
- The Beyond Within: The Rise of LSD and The Fall of LSD (1986) (Everyman episodes) – LSD TV documentary
- The Big Bang (2010) – Valium, methampthetamine
- The Big Boss (1971) – heroin
- The Big Chill (1983) – cannabis, cocaine
- The Big Easy (1987) – heroin
- The Big Lebowski (1998) – cannabis, LSD
- Bigger Than Life (1956) – cortisone (steroid hormone)
- Bird (1988) – heroin
- Black's Game (2012) – speed, MDMA, cocaine
- Black Cat, White Cat (1998) – cocaine
- Black Fear (1915) – cocaine
- Black Snake Moan (2006) – prescription pills, ecstasy
- Black Swan (2010) – ecstasy
- Black Tar Heroin (1999) – black tar heroin, crack cocaine, methamphetamine, alcohol
- Blazing Saddles (1974) – cannabis
- The Bling Ring (2013) – cannabis, cocaine, heroin (smoked)
- Blood In Blood Out (1993) – cocaine, heroin
- Blow (2001) – cocaine, cannabis
- Bluehill Avenue (2001) - cannabis, heroin
- Blue Sunshine (1976) – LSD
- Blue Velvet (1986) – nitrous oxide, amyl nitrate
- Blueberry (2004) – ayahuasca, peyote
- Bobby (2006) – LSD
- Bodies, Rest & Motion (1993) – cannabis
- Boiler Room (2000) – cocaine
- Bonded by Blood (2010) – cocaine, ecstasy
- Bongwater (1997) – cannabis, LSD, and cocaine
- Boogie Nights (1997) – cannabis, cocaine, methamphetamine
- Boondock Saints (1999) – cocaine
- The Boost (1988) – cocaine
- Borderland (2007) – cannabis, psychedelic mushrooms
- Borderline (1950) – drugs not identified
- Born to Win (1971) – heroin
- The Boys & Girls Guide to Getting Down (2006) – cannabis, MDMA, cocaine, crack, heroin, amphetamine, Viagra
- The Boys in the Band (1970) – cannabis
- Boys Don't Cry (1999) – cannabis
- The Boys in Company C (1978) – Demerol and heroin
- Boyhood (2014) – cannabis
- Kids in the Hall: Brain Candy (1996) – fictional drug GLeeMONEX
- The Breakfast Club (1985) – cannabis
- Brick (2006) – heroin
- Bride of Chucky (1998) - cannabis
- Bright Lights, Big City (1988) – cocaine
- Britannia Hospital (1982) – psilocybin mushrooms
- Brokedown Palace (1999) – heroin
- Broken (2007) – heroin
- Broken Vessels (1999) – heroin, methamphetamine
- A Bucket of Blood (1959) – heroin
- Buffalo Soldiers (2001) – heroin, MDMA
- Bug (2006) – methamphetamine, cannabis
- A Bug and a Bag of Weed (2006) – cannabis, hashish
- Bullet (1996) – heroin
- Bully (2001) – cannabis, LSD, methamphetamine
- The Business (2005) – cannabis, MDMA, cocaine

== C ==
- Caddyshack (1980) – cannabis
- Candy (2006) – heroin, cannabis
- Candy Stripe Nurses (1974) – cannabis, amphetamines
- Carlito's Way: Rise to Power (2005) – heroin
- Cartoon All-Stars to the Rescue (1990 TV special) – cannabis, crack
- Cash Crop (2003) – cannabis
- Casino (1995) – cocaine, heroin, painkillers
- Cass (2008) – cannabis
- Caveman (1981) – fictional hallucinogenic berries
- Cecil B. Demented (2000) – heroin
- Chappaqua (1966) – peyote, heroin
- Charlie Bartlett (2008) – prescription pills (klonopin, prozac, ritalin, wellbutrin, xanax and zoloft)
- Cheech & Chong's various films feature drugs such as cannabis, cocaine, LSD, peyote, various pills and Ajax (comedy). They include:
  - Up in Smoke (1978)
  - Cheech & Chong's Next Movie (1980) – cannabis
  - Nice Dreams (1981) – cannabis
  - Things Are Tough All Over (1982) – cannabis
  - Still Smokin' (1983) – cannabis
- Chemical Hunger (2003) – cannabis and cocaine
- Cherry Falls (2000) – cannabis
- Cherry, Harry & Raquel! (1970) – cannabis
- Cherrybomb (2009) – cannabis, cocaine, ecstasy
- Children of Men (2006) – cannabis
- Chinatown Connection (1989) – cocaine
- Chinatown Nights (1929) – opium
- Chinese Opium Den (1894) – opium
- Chopper (2000) – cocaine, heroin, amphetamines
- Christiane F. – Wir Kinder vom Bahnhof Zoo (1981) – cannabis, LSD, heroin, various pills such as Valium and Mandrax
- The City Addicted to Crystal Meth (2009) – crystal meth (methamphetamine)
- City by the Sea (2002) – crack
- City Of God (2002) – cannabis, cocaine
- Clean and Sober (1988) – cocaine
- Clerks (1994) – cannabis
- Clerks II (2006) - cannabis
- Clerks III (2022) - cannabis
- Climax (2018) – LSD, cannabis, cocaine
- Clockers (1995) – crack cocaine
- A Clockwork Orange (1971) – several fictional drugs in the form of a milk cocktail called Moloko Plus; varieties include Moloko Vellocet, either an opiate (percocet) or an amphetamine (velocity, speed), Synthemesc (synthetic mescaline), and Drencrom (adrenochrome)
- Club Paradise (1986) – cannabis
- Clubbed to Death (1996) – MDMA
- Clueless (1995) – cannabis, cocaine
- Cocaine Bear (2023) - cocaine
- Cocaine Shark (2023) - HT25 a fictional drug
- Cocaine Cowboys (2006) - cocaine, cannabis
- Cocaine Cowboys 2 (2008) – cocaine
- Cocaine Crabs from Outer Space (2022) - cocaine
- Cocaine Fiends (1935) = Cocaine
- Cocaine: One Man's Seduction (1983) – cocaine
- Cocksucker Blues – cocaine and heroin
- Code of Silence (1985) – cocaine
- Colegas – cocaine and hashish
- Colors (1988) – cannabis, crack cocaine, PCP
- Conspiracy Theory (1997) – LSD
- Contact High (2009) – cocaine, cannabis, MDMA, LSD, amphetamine
- Contraband (2012) – cocaine
- Contracted (2013) – Rohypnol, heroin
- Coogan's Bluff (1968) – cannabis, LSD
- Cook County aka Pure White B*tch (2008) - crystal meth
- Cookers (2001) – methamphetamine
- The Cool and the Crazy (1958) – cannabis
- Coonskin (1975) – LSD, heroin
- Cop Out (2010) – crack/cocaine, mescaline (referred to)
- Corridors of Blood (1958) – opium-based anaesthetic
- Country Man (1982) – cannabis
- Crank (2006) – fictional drug "Beijing Cocktail", cocaine, epinephrine, "Hardcore Haitian Plant Shit" (which probably refers to khat), methamphetamine, ephedrine, cannabis, and vicodin
- Crooklyn (1994) – glue (toluene)
- Crossing the Bridge (1992) – heroin
- The Crow (1994) – morphine
- Cruel Intentions (1999) – cocaine (memorably taken out of a rosary necklace)
- Crystal Fairy & the Magical Cactus (2012) – mescaline
- The Connection (1961) – heroin

== D ==
- Dallas Buyers Club (2013) – cocaine, alcohol, methamphetamine, zidovudine, zalcitabine, peptide T
- Danger Diabolik (1968) – cannabis
- Darwin's Nightmare (2004) – glue (Toluene)
- The Day of the Beast (1995) – LSD
- Daymaker (2007) – cocaine, MDMA, LSD, cannabis
- Days of Wine and Roses (film) (1962) – alcohol
- Dazed and Confused (1993) – alcohol, cannabis, LSD
- Dead Presidents (1995) – Heroin, morphine
- Dead Man (1995) – peyote
- Dead Man's Shoes (2004) – cocaine, cannabis, LSD, MDMA
- Dead Ringers (1988) – various prescription drugs (dextroamphetamine and opioids)
- Deadly Addiction (1988) – cocaine
- Death at a Funeral (2010) – mescaline, Valium, ketamine (mentioned), acid (the pills in the Valium bottle)
- The Death of Richie (1977) – barbiturates, others
- Death Wish 2 (1982) – cannabis, PCP
- Death Wish 4: The Crackdown (1987) – crack cocaine
- The Decline of Western Civilization Part II: The Metal Years
- Deep Cover (1992) – crack cocaine
- Delta Force 2: The Colombian Connection (1990) – cocaine
- Den Siste Revejakta (2008) – hashish, cannabis, heroin, LSD
- The Departed (2006) – oxycodone, lorazepam, heroin, cocaine
- Deprisa, Deprisa (1981) – heroin
- Descending the Mountain (2021) – psilocybin (documentary about a study by Franz X. Vollenweider)
- Detroit Rock City (1999) – cannabis, psychedelic mushrooms
- Dev.D (2009) – cocaine, LSD, ecstasy, various pills
- Devil's Harvest (1942) – cannabis
- The Devil's Rejects (2005) – cocaine, cannabis
- Dick (1999) – cannabis, Quaaludes
- Dirty Grandpa (2016) – crack cocaine, xanax, cannabis
- Dirty Pictures (2010) – various (about Alexander Shulgin)
- District 13 (2004) – cocaine, cannabis
- DMT: The Spirit Molecule (2010) – DMT documentary
- Domino (2005) – mescaline, cannabis, cocaine
- Donkey Punch (2008) – ketamine, Methamphetamine, MDMA, cannabis
- Don's Plum (2001) – heroin, cannabis
- Don't Be a Menace to South Central While Drinking Your Juice in the Hood (1996) – cannabis, crack cocaine
- Don't Tell Mom the Babysitter's Dead (1991) – cannabis
- The Doors (1991) – LSD, cocaine, heroin, cannabis, peyote
- Dope Sick Love (2005) – heroin, crack cocaine
- Down in the Valley (2005) – MDMA
- Dragon Eyes (2012) – crack, heroin
- Dream with the Fishes (1997) – heroin, LSD
- Dreamseller (2007) – heroin
- Dredd (2012) – fictional drug Slo-mo (slows the user's perception to 1%)
- The Drug Traffic (1923)
- Drugstore Cowboy (1989) – cocaine, hydromorphone, oxymorphone, morphine, amphetamines, valium (diazepam), methamphetamine, heroin
- Dude, Where's My Car? (2000) – cannabis
- Due Date (2010) – cannabis and vicodin
- The Dukes of Hazzard (2005) – cannabis
- Drug Call (2024) – heroin, LSD

== E ==
- Easy A (2010) – cannabis
- Easy Rider (1969) – cannabis, cocaine and LSD
- Easy Money (1983) – marijuana
- Easy Money (2010) - cocaine
- Easy Street (1917) – cocaine
- Ecstasy (2011) – Little Red Pill
- ed! (1996) – cannabis, MDMA
- Ed Wood (1994) – morphine
- Eden Lake (2009) – amyl nitrate
- El Camino: A Breaking Bad Movie (2019) - cocaine, Methylamine mentioned
- Elephant White (2011) – heroin
- Embrace of the Serpent (2015) – nyakwána, Ayahuasca (caapi), yakruna (fictional)
- Emerald Forest (1985) – Virola snuff
- Empire (2002) – heroin, cannabis
- Empire Records (1995) – amphetamines
- Enter the Dragon (1973) – heroin
- Enter the Void (2009) – cocaine, LSD, GHB, cannabis, MDMA, methamphetamine, Datura, DMT
- Equilibrium (2002) – fictional drug Prozium
- Essex Boys (2000) – MDMA, heroin
- Eternal Sunshine of the Spotless Mind (2004) – cannabis
- Euro Trip (2004) – cannabis/hashish, absinthe, amphetamines, benzedrine
- Even Cowgirls Get the Blues (1993) – peyote
- Everywhere and Nowhere (2011) – cannabis, cocaine, MDMA
- Evil Bong (2006) – cannabis
- Evil Bong 2: King Bong (2009) – cannabis
- The Expendables (2010) – cocaine
- The Exorcist (1973) – ritalin and thorazine
- Extract (2009) – ketamine, Xanax, various other drugs
- Eyes Wide Shut (1999) – cannabis, speedballs

== F ==
- Factory Girl (2006) – cannabis, speed, heroin, prescription pills
- The Falcon and the Snowman (1985) – cocaine
- Fanboys (2009) – peyote
- Fandango (2000) – cannabis, cocaine
- Fast Times at Ridgemont High (1982) – cannabis
- Faster (2010) – heroin
- Fear and Loathing in Las Vegas (1998) – cannabis, mescaline, thorazine, LSD, cocaine, amphetamines, barbiturates, ether, amyl nitrite, opium, hashish, hash oil, heroin, adrenochrome
- Federal Fugitives (1941) – pills
- Fifty Pills (2006) – MDMA
- The Final Programme (1973)
- The Five Heartbeats (1991) – cocaine
- Flashback (1990) – LSD
- Flirting with Disaster (1996) – LSD
- Foo-Foo Dust (2003) – crack cocaine and heroin
- The Football Factory (2004) – cannabis, inhalants, amphetamines, crack/cocaine
- A Force of One (1979) – cocaine and heroin
- For a Few Dollars More (1965) – tobacco, fictional white cigarette like weed (among the first display of drugs in cinema)
- Formula 51 (2002) – fictional drug like ecstasy
- Forrest Gump (1994) – cocaine, heroin, cannabis, LSD, unidentified pills
- Freak Talks About Sex (1999) – cannabis
- Freebird (2008) – marijuana, psychedelic mushrooms
- Freddy's Dead: The Final Nightmare (1991) – cannabis
- The French Connection (1971) – heroin, cocaine
- French Connection II (1975) – heroin
- Fresh (1994) – cocaine, crack cocaine, heroin
- Friday (1995) – cannabis, PCP
- Friday After Next (2002) – cannabis
- Friday the 13th film series (1980–2009) – cannabis is smoked in most of the films
- Friday the 13th Part VIII: Jason Takes Manhattan (1989) – cocaine, heroin
- Friend of the World (2020) – a fictional hallucinogenic drug
- Fringe series – LSD, unidentified psychoactive drugs
- Fritz the Cat (1972) – cannabis, heroin
- From Hell (2001) – opium, laudanum, absinthe
- From Paris with Love (2010) – cocaine, possibly heroin

== G ==
- Gambling, Gods and LSD (2002) – crack, cocaine, LSD
- Gangster Exchange (2011) – cannabis, MDMA, LSD, crack, heroin
- Garden State (2004) – cocaine, MDMA, marijuana, nitrous oxide
- Georgia (1995) – heroin
- Get Him to the Greek (2010) – cannabis, absinthe, heroin, "Jeffrey", cocaine, adrenaline
- Get Out and Get Under (1920) – cocaine
- Get Rich or Die Tryin' (2005) – crack, cannabis, morphine
- Ghost in the Shell (2017) – cannabis
- Gia (1998) – heroin, cocaine
- Gift (1993)
- The Girl Who Knew Too Much (1963) – cannabis
- Girl, Interrupted (1999) – cannabis, diazepam, Vallium
- The Girl Next Door (2004) – MDMA, cannabis
- Go (1999) – MDMA, cannabis, cocaine
- Go Ask Alice (1973) – LSD, cannabis, amphetamines
- The Godfather (1972) – cocaine, heroin
- The Godfather Part II (1974) – cocaine, heroin
- The Godfather Part III (1990) – cocaine, heroin
- Good Boys (2019) - ecstasy
- The Good Shepherd (2006) – LSD
- Good Time (2017) – LSD, Oxycontin, Xanax, cannabis
- Goodfellas (1990) – cocaine, pills
- Goon (2011) – cannabis
- Gorp (1980) – amphetamines, Quaaludes
- Grandma's Boy (2006) – cannabis
- Grass (1999) – cannabis
- The Greatest (2009)
- The Green Butchers (2003) – cannabis
- The Green Hornet (2011) – methamphetamine
- Gretel & Hansel (2020) – Amanita muscaria
- Gridlock'd (1997) – heroin
- Grimsby (2016) – cocaine, heroin
- Grindhouse (2007) – cannabis
- Groove (2000) – GHB, MDMA, nitrous, LSD, cannabis
- The Groove Tube (1974) – cannabis
- The Guard (2011) – LSD, cocaine
- The Guest (2014) – marijuana
- Gummo (1997) – glue, Ritalin, solvents, cocaine

== H ==
- La Haine (1995) – cannabis, hashish, cocaine
- Hair (1979) – cannabis, LSD
- Half Baked (1998) – cannabis
- Half Nelson (2006) – cocaine, crack cocaine
- Hall Pass (2011) – cannabis
- Halloween (1978) – cannabis
- The Hangover (2009) – GHB, rohypnol
- The Hangover 2 (2011) – cocaine
- The Hangover 3 (2013) – demerol, rohypnol, ecstasy
- Hannibal (2001) – chloroform, morphine, unknown sedatives
- Happy Death Day (2017) – unknown lethal drugs, aggression-inducing drugs
- Hard Ticket to Hawaii (1987) – cannabis
- Hardbodies (1984) – marijuana and cocaine
- Hare Rama Hare Krishna (1971) – cannabis
- Harold & Kumar Escape from Guantanamo Bay (2008) – cannabis, psilocybin mushrooms
- Harold & Kumar Go to White Castle (2004) – cannabis, MDMA, cocaine
- Harold & Kumar: A Very Harold & Kumar 3D Christmas (2011) – cannabis, psilocybin extract, crack, ecstasy, cocaine
- Harry Brown (2009) – cannabis, crack cocaine, heroin
- Harsh Times (2006) – cannabis
- Harvard Man (2001) – cannabis, LSD
- The Hasher's Delirium, aka Le songe d'un garçon de café (1910) – absinthe
- A Hatful of Rain (1957) – morphine
- Havoc (2005) – cocaine, crack
- Head (1968) – cannabis, LSD
- Head, Heart and Balls... or Why I Gave Up Smoking Pot (2007) – cannabis
- Head On (1998) - methamphetamine, cannabis
- Heavy Metal (1981) – fictional drug "Nyborg" (parody of cocaine)
- The Heart Is Deceitful Above All Things (2004) – methamphetamine
- Hells Angels on Wheels (1967) – cannabis, amphetamines
- Hemet, or the Landlady Don't Drink Tea (2023) – bath salts
- High Art (1998) – heroin
- High School Confidential (1958) – cannabis, heroin
- High School High (1996) – cannabis
- Hobo with a Shotgun (2011) – cocaine
- Hollywood High (2003)
- Holy Rollers (2010) – MDMA
- El hombre de los hongos, aka The Mushroom Man (1976) – psychedelic mushrooms
- A Home at the End of the World (2004) – cannabis, LSD
- Homegrown (1998) – cannabis
- Honky (1971) - marijuana
- La Horde (2010) – cocaine
- Horrible Bosses (2011) – cocaine, nitrous oxide
- Horrible Bosses 2 (2014) – nitrous oxide (laughing gas)
- Hot Rod (2007) – LSD
- Hot Tub Time Machine (2010) – cannabis, psilocybin mushrooms, cocaine
- How High (2001) – cannabis
- Human Traffic (1999) – cannabis, cocaine, MDMA
- Human Wreckage (1923)
- Humboldt County (2008) – cannabis
- Hunt to Kill (2010) – methamphetamine
- Hurlyburly (1998) – cannabis, cocaine, diazepam
- Hustle & Flow (2005) – cannabis
- Homeless to Harvard: The Liz Murray Story (2003) – heroin

== I ==
- ICE- Hawaii's Crystal Meth Epidemic (2005) - History of methamphetamine from WWII to the shores of Waikiki
- I Come in Peace (1990) – heroin and Barsi (fictional drug manufactured by extraterrestrial technology)
- I Got the Hook Up (1998) – cannabis, cocaine and LSD
- I Love You, Alice B. Toklas (1968) – cannabis brownies
- I Love You Phillip Morris (2010) – heroin
- Idle Hands (1999) – cannabis
- If Drugs Were Legal (2009) – cannabis, cocaine, crack, ketamine, heroin, MDMA, LSD, amphetamines (and fictional drugs, including "dexclorazole," which mimics the effects of fluoxetine but on a much larger scale; and "xp25," which stimulates the serotonin neurotransmitters in the brain but causes sudden heart attack)
- Igby Goes Down (2002) – heroin, cannabis
- Ill manors (2012) – crack, cannabis
- Illtown (1998)
- I'm Dancing as Fast as I Can (1982) – Diazepam
- In Bruges (2008) – cocaine, ketamine, LSD, ecstasy
- In Vanda's Room (2000) – heroin
- Inauguration of the Pleasure Dome (1954) – ayahuasca
- Ingrid Goes West (2017) – cannabis, cocaine
- Inherent Vice (2014) – cannabis, heroin
- Inner Trial (2008) – LSD, cannabis, psychedelic mushrooms
- An Innocent Man (1989) – cocaine
- Into the Blue (2005) – cocaine
- Iowa (2005) – manufacture and use of methamphetamine
- Irréversible (2002) – cocaine
- Irvine Welsh's Ecstasy (2011) – ecstasy, cannabis and cocaine
- It's All Gone Pete Tong (2004) – cocaine, yopo snuff, and toad licking, presumably a reference to the Bufo Alvarius or Colorado River toad from which the extract should not actually be licked as in the film, but smoked, due to bufo toxin which is incinerated upon smoking; can contain 5-meo-dmt and/or bufotenin

== J ==
- Jackie Brown (1997) – cocaine, cannabis
- Jacob's Ladder (1990) – Quinuclidinyl benzilate (BZ)
- Janky Promoters (2009) – cannabis
- Jay and Silent Bob Strike Back (2001) – cannabis
- Jay and Silent Bob Reboot (1999) - cannabis
- Jesus' Son (1999) – heroin, cannabis, cocaine, LSD, opium, psychedelic mushrooms, tobacco, amphetamines, and diazepam
- Jewel Robbery (1932) – cannabis
- Johnny Stecchino (1991) – cocaine
- Jubilee (1977) – Quaaludes
- Jungle (2017) – psilocybin mushrooms
- Jungle Fever (1991) – crack cocaine

== K ==
- K-PAX (2001) – thorazine and haldol
- Ken Park (2002) – marijuana
- The Kentucky Fried Movie (1977) – heroin and opium
- Kid Cannabis (2014) – cannabis, cocaine, oxycodone
- Kids (1995) – marijuana, nitrous oxide, MDMA, cocaine and possibly GHB (not ketamine)
- Kidulthood (2006) – cannabis, cocaine, unknown pills
- Kill Bill: Vol. 2 (2004) – cocaine
- Kill Your Darlings (2013) – marijuana, nitrous oxide, benzedrine and methamphetamine
- Killer Bud (2001) – marijuana
- Killing Zoe (1994) – heroin
- King of New York (1990) – cocaine
- Kinjite: Forbidden Subjects (1989) – marijuana, cocaine and heroin
- Kiss of the Dragon (2001) – heroin
- Kneecap (film) (2024) – ketamine, LSD, MDMA, marijuana
- Knocked Up (2007) – marijuana and psychedelic mushrooms
- Kush (2007) – marijuana, cocaine

== L ==
- L.A. Confidential (1997) – marijuana and heroin
- Lady Sings The Blues (1972) – heroin
- Lammbock (2001) – marijuana, hashish, psychedelic mushrooms and cocaine
- The Last American Virgin (1982) – marijuana and cocaine
- The Last Days of Disco (1998)
- Last Life in the Universe (2003) – marijuana
- The Last Minute (2001) – heroin
- Layer Cake (2004) – cocaine, crack cocaine and MDMA
- Leaves of Grass (2009) – marijuana
- Leaving Las Vegas (1995) – alcohol
- Lenny (1974) – heroin
- Léon: The Professional (1994) – cocaine
- Leprechaun in the Hood (2000) - marijuana
- Leprechaun: Back 2 tha Hood (2003) – marijuana
- Less than Zero (1987) – cocaine
- Lethal Weapon (1987) – cocaine and heroin
- Lethal Weapon 4 (1998) – nitrous oxide (laughing gas)
- Licence to Kill (1989) – cocaine
- The Life Aquatic with Steve Zissou (2004) – marijuana
- Life or Meth - Hawaii's Youth (2006) Follow up to documentary film simulcast in state of Hawaii, authentic, real teenagers
- Life Is Hot in Cracktown (2009) – crack cocaine
- Light Sleeper (1992) – cocaine
- Lights in the Dusk (2006) – alcohol
- Limitless (2011) – fictional drug "NZT48"
- Liquid Sky (1982) – heroin
- Little Fish (2005) – heroin
- Little Miss Sunshine – heroin, Viagra and anorectics are referred to
- Little Shop of Horrors (1986) – nitrous oxide (laughing gas)
- Live and Let Die (1973) – heroin
- Live Nude Girls (1995) – marijuana
- Lock, Stock and Two Smoking Barrels (1998) – marijuana and cocaine
- Loft (2008) – cocaine
- London (2005) – cocaine and marijuana
- London Boulevard (2010) – cannabis, cocaine, opium
- Looking for Eric (2009) – marijuana
- Lord of War (2005) – cocaine and brown-brown
- Lords of Dogtown (2005) – marijuana
- The Loser Takes It All (2002) – alcohol
- Lost in Translation (2003) – marijuana, possibly other psychedelics
- The Lost Weekend (1945) – alcohol
- Love (2015) – alcohol, ayahuasca, marijuana
- Love. Blood. Kryptonite. (2008) – marijuana, cocaine
- Love Is the Drug (2006) – cocaine, prescription pills
- Love Liza (2002) – gasoline fumes
- Low Down (2014) – heroin
- LSD, Trip or Trap (1967) – LSD
- Lucy (2014) – fictional nootropic CPH4

== M ==
- MacArthur Park (2001) – crack cocaine
- Machete (2010) – cannabis, methamphetamine
- Mafia! (1998) – cocaine
- Magic Trip (2011) – LSD, AMT, psychedelics
- Magnolia (1999) – cocaine, amphetamines (Dexedrine), morphine
- Magnum Force (1973) – heroin
- Malibu Beach (1978) – marijuana
- Malibu High (1979) – marijuana, cocaine
- Mallrats (1995) – cannabis
- Mandy (2018) - LSD, cocaine
- The Martian (2015) – vicodin
- Midnight Delight (2016) – cannabis
- The Man with the Golden Arm (1955) – heroin
- Mantis in Lace (1968) – LSD
- Marfa Girl (2012) – cannabis
- Maria Full of Grace (2004) – heroin
- Marihuana (1936) – cannabis
- Maryjane (1968) – cannabis and hashish
- Mask (1985) – unidentified drugs
- Max Payne (2008) – fictional drug Valkyrie
- McCabe & Mrs. Miller (1971) – opium
- McQ (1974) – heroin and cocaine
- MDMA (2010) – MDMA
- Mean Streets (1973) – heroin
- The Men Who Stare At Goats (2009) – steroids, LSD, cannabis, amphetamine
- Menace II Society (1993) – crack cocaine, heroin and cannabis
- Miami Vice (2006) – cocaine
- Middle Men (2009) – cocaine, barbiturates
- Midnight Cowboy (1969) – marijuana, unspecified hallucinogenic pills
- Midnight Express (1978) – hashish, codeine, LSD and cannabis, references to heroin
- Midsommar (2019) – psilocybin mushrooms
- A Midsummer Night's Rave (2002) – MDMA, cocaine
- Mike and Dave Need Wedding Dates (2016) – cannabis, MDMA
- Minority Report (2002) – fictional psychoactive drug "Clarity"
- Missing Link (1988) – unidentified plant
- Modern Times (1936) – cocaine
- Mondo Mod (1967) – cannabis
- Moneyz (2009) – cannabis, cocaine, heroin, methamphetamine, LSD
- Monkey on My Back (1957) – morphine
- Monos (2019) – psilocybin
- More (1969) – cannabis, heroin, absinthe, Dexamyl (amphetamine-barbiturate), LSD, and a homemade concoction made from cannabis (resin), benzedrine, "red ibogaine", nutmeg and banana peel
- Morfiy (2008) – morphine
- Morning Patrol (1987) – alcohol
- Death Walks at Midnight (1972) – LSD
- Most High (2006) – cocaine and methamphetamine
- Mouth to Mouth (2005) – cannabis, many other drugs
- Mr. Nice (2010) – marijuana, hashish
- Munje! (2001) – cannabis
- My Name Ain't Johnny (2008) cannabis, mainly cocaine
- My Own Private Idaho (1991) – cocaine
- Mysterious Skin (2004) – cocaine
- The Mystery of the Leaping Fish (1916) – cocaine, opium

== N ==
- The Naked Gun (1988) – heroin
- Naked Lunch (1991) – heroin, cannabis, opiates, fictional hallucinogenic bug powder
- A Name for Evil (1973) – LSD
- Narc (2002) – heroin, cannabis and possibly cocaine
- Narrenschwämme – von Pilzen, Gordon Wasson und anderen Sonderlingen (Magic Mushrooms – From Mushrooms, Gordon Wasson and Other Eccentrics [The Mushroom Man]) (1996) – magic mushrooms documentary
- National Lampoon's Animal House (1978) – cannabis
- National Lampoon's Totally Baked: A Potumentary (2006) – cannabis
- National Lampoon's Vacation (1983) – marijuana
- Natural Born Killers (1994) – magic mushrooms, other drugs suggested but not explicitly stated
- Navajeros (1980) – LSD and Hashish
- Neighbors (2014) – cannabis, magic mushrooms
- Neighbors 2: Sorority Rising (2016) – cannabis, GHB
- Never Die Alone (2004) – cocaine, heroin
- New Jack City (1991) – crack cocaine
- Next Day Air (2009) – cocaine, cannabis
- Next Friday (2000) – cannabis
- Nice Dreams (1981) - cannabis, marijuana
- The Night Before (2015) – psychedelic mushrooms, cannabis, MDMA, cocaine
- A Nightmare on Drug Street (1989) – cocaine, unidentified pills
- A Nightmare on Elm Street 3: Dream Warriors (1987) – heroin
- Nil by Mouth (1997) – heroin
- The Nine Lives of Fritz the Cat (1974) – cannabis, hallucinogenic drugs
- Nine to Five (1980) – cannabis
- Nixon (1995) – prescription drugs
- Nobody (2021) - cocaine
- No Country for Old Men (2007) – heroin
- Nordkraft (2005) – cannabis, cocaine, methadone, heroin
- North Dallas Forty (1979) – marijuana, cocaine and painkillers
- The Northman (2022) – Amanita muscaria
- Notorious (2009) – cocaine, crack and cannabis
- Nowhere (1997) – cannabis and MDMA

== O ==
- O (2001) – steroids, cocaine
- On the Road (2012) – cannabis, benzedrine, morphine and alcohol
- Once Upon a Time in America (1984) – opium
- Once Upon a Time in Hollywood (2019) – alcohol, cannabis, LSD
- One False Move (1992) – cocaine
- One Perfect Day (2004) – cannabis, painkillers, amphetamines and MDMA
- Ong-Bak (2008) – opium
- The Opium Eater (2011) – opium
- Orange County (2002) – amphetamines, painkillers, cannabis, MDMA
- The Other Guys (2010) – cannabis mentioned
- Over The Edge (1979) – cannabis and LSD
- Out of the Blue (1980)
- Outland (1981) – amphetamine-type drug
- The Outrun (2024) – alcohol
- Outside Providence (1999) – cannabis and Quaaludes (referred to as "vitamin Q")
- Oxy-morons (2010) – oxycotin, heroin, Vicodin

== P ==
- The Pace That Kills (aka Cocaine Fiends) (1935) – cocaine
- Paid in Full (2002) – cocaine, crack and cannabis
- Pain & Gain (2013) – cocaine, ecstasy, Xylazine
- The Palermo Connection (1991) – all drugs are referred to
- The Panic in Needle Park (1971) – heroin
- Pandemic in a Pandemic (2021) - Post Covid rise in mental health issues and substance abuse
- Papillon (1973) – cocaine (coca leaves)
- Parked (2010) – heroin and cannabis
- Party Monster (2003) – crack/cocaine, heroin, MDMA, LSD, ketamine
- Pathology (2008) – methamphetamine, nitrous oxide (laughing gas)
- PCU (1994) – cannabis
- Perfect High (2015) – hydrocodone, codeine, Oxycontin, heroin; Adderall and benzodiazepines are referred to
- Performance (1970) – psychedelic mushrooms
- Permanent Midnight (1998) – heroin and cocaine
- Photographing Fairies (1997) – fictional psychoactive flowers
- Pimp (2010) – cannabis, crack/cocaine, heroin is referred to
- Pineapple Express (2008) – cannabis, Oxycodone is referred to
- Piñero (2001) – heroin, cannabis, cocaine
- Pink Cadillac (1989) – methamphetamine
- Pink Flamingos (1972) – poppers; the Marbles are involved in a heroin ring in inner-city schools
- Pink Floyd The Wall (1982) – hashish; this film is often considered a drug-induced movie (LSD, psychedelics)
- Pirates of Silicon Valley (1999) – cannabis, LSD
- The Place Beyond the Pines (2012) - cannabis, MDMA, oxycontin
- Platoon (1986) – cannabis, and opium
- Platoon Leader (1988) – heroin
- Playing God (1997) – fentanyl, morphine and amphetamines
- Poltergeist (1982) – cannabis
- Polvere (2009) – cocaine
- Portrait of a Lady on Fire (2019) – atropine, scopolamine (Flying ointment )
- Possession (1981) – psilocybin mushrooms
- Pot Zombies (2005) – cannabis
- Prayer of the Rollerboys (1990) – fictional drug "mist"
- Prince of the City (1981) - heroin
- The Principles of Lust (2003) – cannabis, cocaine, MDMA, ayahuasca (yage), pills
- The Private Lives of Pippa Lee (2009) – dexedrine, amphetamine
- Private Parts (1997) – marijuana
- Project X (2012) – ecstasy, cocaine, cannabis
- Protégé (2007) – heroin
- Prozac Nation (2001) – cannabis, cocaine, prozac (fluoxetine) and ecstasy
- Psych-Out (1968) – LSD and DOM (STP)
- Puddle Cruiser (1996) – cannabis
- Puff, Puff, Pass (2006) – cannabis
- Pulp Fiction (1994) – cocaine, heroin, cannabis
- Punisher: War Zone (2008) – cocaine, methamphetamine
- Pure (2002) – heroin

== Q ==
- Quadrophenia (1979) – amphetamines (known as "Blues" in the film)
- Quiet Cool (1986) – marijuana

== R ==
- Rachel Getting Married (2008) – cannabis, Oxycodone (Percocet)
- Rambo: Last Blood (2019) - cocaine, Flunitrazepam, valium pills
- Rapture-Palooza (2013) – cannabis
- Rave - The Ultimate Party (2000) – MDMA
- Ray (2004) – heroin, cannabis
- Rebound: The Legend of Earl "The Goat" Manigault (1996) – heroin
- Red Angel (Movie), aka Akai tenshi (1966) – morphine
- Reefer Madness (1936) – cannabis
- Reefer Madness (2005 remake) – cannabis
- Reeker (2005) – MDMA
- Amants réguliers, Les (2005) – cannabis
- Reindeer Spotting – Escape from Santaland (2010) – Subutex, amphetamine, heroin and cannabis
- Remember the Daze (2007) – mushrooms, cannabis
- Reno 911!: Miami (2007) – cocaine
- Rent (2005) – heroin, cannabis
- Repo! The Genetic Opera (2008) – fictional drug "Zydrate," a powerful and highly-addictive painkiller and hallucinogenic, manufactured by GeneCo, for people undergoing surgery; "graverobbers" sell a cheap version of Zydrate on the black market extracted from the blood of the dead
- Repo Man (1984) – cannabis, cocaine and amphetamines
- Requiem for a Dream (2000) – heroin, cannabis, MDMA, cocaine, amphetamines, barbiturates
- Return to Paradise (1998) – cannabis resin
- Revenge of the Nerds (1984) – cannabis
- Riding the Bullet (2004) – cannabis
- Rich Kids (1979) – cocaine
- Righteous Kill (2009) – cocaine
- Riot on Sunset Strip (1967) – marijuana and LSD
- Rise of the Footsoldier (2007) – steroids, cannabis, cocaine, heroin, MDMA, ketamine
- Rise of the Planet of the Apes (2011) – fictional drug "ALZ-113"
- Risky Business (1983) – cannabis
- RoboCop (1987) – cocaine
- RoboCop 2 (1990) – fictional drug "Nuke"
- RocknRolla (2008) – cannabis, cocaine, heroin
- Rockers (1978) – cannabis
- Rolling (2007) – MDMA, cannabis
- Rolling Kansas (2003) – cannabis
- Romeo + Juliet (1996) – a substance that is similar to, or actually is MDMA, known as "Queen Mab"
- The Rose (1979) – heroin, barbiturates
- The Royal Tenenbaums (2001) – cannabis, cocaine, mescaline
- Rube in an Opium Joint (1904) – opium; considered the oldest still existing motion picture to contain substance abuse
- The Rules of Attraction (2002) – mushrooms, cocaine, LSD, methamphetamine, cannabis and MDMA
- The Rum Diary (2011) – LSD
- Run! Bitch Run! (2009) – cannabis, crack/cocaine
- The Runaways (2010) – cocaine, MDMA, Quaaludes
- Running with Scissors (2006) – prescription medications
- Rush (1991) – heroin, tobacco, amphetamines, cannabis, cocaine

== S ==
- The Salton Sea (2002) – methamphetamine
- Sample People (2000) – fictional drug "glow" and cocaine
- Sausage Party (2016) – cannabis, bath salts
- Savage Beach (1989) – heroin
- Savages (2012) – cannabis, cocaine
- Saving Grace (2000) – cannabis
- A Scanner Darkly (2006) – cocaine, cannabis, methamphetamine, and "Substance D," a fictional psychoactive stimulant
- Scarface (1983) – cocaine, heroin, Quaaludes
- Scary Movie (2000) - cannabis
- Scott Pilgrim vs. the World (2010) – cannabis, mushrooms
- Scrooged (1988) – marijuana and heroin
- Secrets of Chinatown (1935) – opium
- The Serpent and the Rainbow (1988) – Haitian witch concoction containing scopolamine
- The Seven-Per-Cent Solution (1976) – cocaine
- Sex and the City (2008) – marijuana
- Sex & Drugs & Rock & Roll (2010) – cannabis, amphetamines, cocaine
- Sexy Bitches (2005) – cannabis
- The Sexy Killer (1976) – heroin
- Shank (2010) – khat, cannabis
- She Shoulda Said 'No'! (1949) – cannabis
- Sherrybaby (2004) – heroin
- Shot List (2009) – LSD, cocaine, cannabis
- Shrink (2009) – cannabis, amphetamine, cocaine
- Shrooms (2007) – magic mushrooms, cannabis
- Siberia (1998) – cannabis, MDMA, amyl nitrate
- Sid and Nancy (1986) – heroin, methadone, cannabis
- The Skeleton Twins (2014) – nitrous oxide, alcohol, cannabis
- Skidoo (1968) – LSD
- Slackers (2002) – cannabis
- SLC Punk! (1999) – LSD, oxycodone, Percocet, cannabis
- Sleepaway Camp II: Unhappy Campers (1988) – marijuana
- Slim Susie (2003) – amphetamine, heroin, cannabis
- Smiley Face (2007) – cannabis
- Smoked. The Movie (2012) – cannabis, cocaine
- Smokin' Aces (2007) – cocaine, ritalin
- The Social Network (2010) – cocaine, cannabis
- Something Weird (1967) – LSD
- Sorted (2000) – heroin, MDMA, methamphetamine, pills
- Sorry to Bother You (2018) – Cannabis, cocaine
- Soul Plane (2004) – mushrooms, cannabis
- Southwest Nine (2004) – LSD, MDMA, cannabis
- Spring Break (1983) – marijuana
- Spring Breakers (2013) – marijuana, crack/cocaine
- Spun (2002) – ephedrine, methamphetamine
- Square Grouper: The Godfathers of Ganja (2011) – cannabis
- Squeeze (1997)
- Stakeout on Dope Street (1958) - heroin
- Stark Raving Mad (2002) – cannabis, GHB, MDMA
- Starsky & Hutch (2004) – cocaine
- State Property (2002) – cannabis, crack/cocaine
- Steal This Movie (2000) – cannabis
- Steppenwolf (1974)
- Steve-O: Demise And Rise – cannabis, LSD, PCP, cocaine, nitrous oxide, pills
- Stoned (2005) – cannabis, hashish, LSD, DMT, psilocybin, cocaine, alcohol, amphetamines, barbiturates
- The Stoned Age (1994) – cannabis
- Stoned: In The Beginning (2010) – cannabis, LSD, cocaine, sleeping pills, crack
- Strange Days (1995) – fictional drug "SQUID"
- Strange Wilderness (2008) – cannabis, nitrous oxide
- Streets of Blood (2009) – cocaine/crack
- Stripes (1981) – LSD
- Stuck in Love" (2012)- cannabis, cocaine
- The Student Nurses (1970) – LSD
- The Substance: Albert Hofmann's LSD (2011) – LSD
- Sugarhouse (2007) – cannabis, crack/cocaine
- Summer of Sam (1999) – cocaine, cannabis
- Sunset Strip (2000) – cannabis, cocaine, LSD, alcohol
- The Sunshine Makers (2015) – LSD (about Nicholas Sand and Tim Scully)
- Super Fly (1972) – cocaine, cannabis
- Super High Me (2007) – cannabis
- Super Troopers (2001) – cannabis, psychedelic mushrooms, LSD
- Superbad (2007) – cocaine, cannabis
- Surfer, Dude (2008) – cannabis
- S.W.A.T.: Firefight (2011) – cannabis
- Sweet Bird of Youth (1962) – amphetamine, cannabis (resin)
- Sweet Nothing (1996) – crack cocaine
- Synanon (1965) – heroin

== T ==
- Taking Off (1971) – cannabis
- Taking Woodstock (2009) – cannabis, LSD
- Taxi 3 (2003) – cannabis and cocaine
- Ted (2012) – cannabis, psychedelic mushrooms and cocaine implicated
- Ted 2 (2015) – cannabis and cocaine implicated
- Tenacious D in The Pick of Destiny (2006) – cannabis, psychedelic mushrooms
- Terminal Bliss (1992) – marijuana, cocaine, LSD and methamphetamine
- Terrifier 2 (2022) - cocaine, MDMA
- Thank You for Smoking (2006) – cigarettes, nicotine (patches)
- That Was Then... This Is Now (1985) – unknown "colorful" pills (assumed LSD)
- That's Your Funeral (1972) – cannabis
- The Thing (1982) – cannabis
- The Cannabis Diary (2022) – cannabis
- Things We Lost in the Fire (2007) - heroin
- Thirteen (2003) – inhalants ("Airduster"), LSD, cannabis, cocaine, various prescription drugs, MDMA (in the form of "Booty Juice")
- This Is England (2006) – cannabis
- This Is the End (2013) – cannabis, MDMA, Magic Mushrooms
- Thriller - A Cruel Picture (1973) – heroin
- Through a Blue Lens (1999) – crack cocaine, heroin
- Thumbsucker (2005) – cannabis, cocaine, and ritalin
- Thursday (1998) – cocaine, cannabis
- tick, tick... BOOM! (2021) - cannabis
- Tideland (2005) – heroin
- The Tingler (1959) – first film to feature LSD
- Toad Road (2012) – acid, various other drugs
- Tommy (1975) – heroin, LSD
- Tomorrow, When the War Began (2010) – cannabis
- The Town (2010) – oxycontin, cocaine
- Trading Places (1983) – marijuana
- Traffic (2000) – cannabis, cocaine, heroin, crack cocaine
- Trailer Park Jesus (2012) – LSD
- Training Day (2001) – cannabis, crack cocaine, and PCP
- Trainspotting (1996) – heroin, opium, MDMA, amphetamines, Valium, hashish, morphine, diamorphine, cyclizine, codeine, temazepam, nitrazepam, phenobarbitone, sodium amytal, dextropropoxyphene, methadone, nalbuphine, pethidine, pentazocine, buprenorphine, dextromoramide, chlormethiazole
- Transformers: Revenge of the Fallen (2009) – cannabis brownies
- Trapped in a Purple Haze (2000) – heroin
- Trash (1970) – heroin
- Trolls (2016) – satirical messages about psychedelic drugs including opium
- The Trip (1967) – LSD, cannabis
- The Tripper (2007) – cocaine, nitrous oxide, cannabis, LSD, MDMA
- True Romance (1993) – cocaine, cannabis
- Tweek City (1995) – methamphetamine
- Twelve (2010) – cannabis, Twelve (fictional drug with similar effects to MDMA and cocaine), many drugs referred to
- Twin Peaks: Fire Walk with Me (1992) – cocaine
- Twin Town (1997) – cannabis, heroin, cocaine, magic mushrooms, glue
- Twins (1988) - Cocaine use
- The Temptations (1998) – cocaine

== U ==
- Uncivilised (1937) – opium
- The Union: The Business Behind Getting High (2007) – cannabis
- The UnMiracle (2017) – cocaine, heroin, ritalin and vicodin
- Up in Smoke (1978) – cannabis, LSD, pills, amphetamines
- Unprescribed - Prescription for Addiction (2021) Opioids
- The Usual Suspects (1995) – cocaine
- Udta Punjab (2016) – cocaine, heroin, pheniramine, buprenorphine (chaanf in Punjab)

== V ==
- Valley of the Dolls (1967) – barbiturates (Seconal, Nembutal, Amytal), amphetamines (Dexedrine), and Demerol
- Vanishing Point (1971) – amphetamine (Benzedrine)
- Veronika Voss (1982) – opiates
- Very Bad Things (1998) – marijuana and cocaine
- A Very Brady Sequel (1996) – magic mushrooms

== W ==
- The Wackness (2008) – cannabis, cocaine, methylphenidate and anti-depressants
- Waiting... (2005) – cannabis and inhalants
- Wall Street (1987) – cocaine, mushrooms mentioned
- Walk Hard: The Dewey Cox Story (2007) – cannabis, cocaine, Quaaludes, PCP, amphetamine, pills ("uppers and downers"), LSD and Viagra
- Walk the Line (2005) – cocaine and amphetamine
- The Warriors – marijuana
- The Wash (2001) – cannabis
- We Need to Talk About Kevin (2011) – prozac (fluoxetine)
- Weekend at Bernie's (1989) – cocaine and heroin
- Weirdsville (2007) – heroin, cannabis
- We're the Millers (2013) – cannabis
- What Just Happened (2008) – hydromorphone, benzodiazepines, cocaine is referred to
- Where the Boys Are '84 (1984) – marijuana
- Where the Buffalo Roam (1980) – cannabis, cocaine and mescaline
- Where the Day Takes You (1992) – multiple drugs
- While We're Young (2015) – ayahuasca
- Who'll Stop the Rain (1978) – heroin
- Why Do Fools Fall in Love (1998)
- The Wild Angels (1966) – marijuana and heroin
- Wild in the Streets (1968) – LSD
- Winter's Bone (2010) – methamphetamine, cocaine, marijuana
- Withnail and I (1987) – cannabis, speed and other pills
- Without a Paddle (2004) – cannabis
- The Wolf of Wall Street (2013) – cocaine, crack cocaine, Quaaludes, and a mention of cannabis, Xanax and morphine
- Woodstock (1970) – cannabis, LSD, and other psychedelics
- Wonderland (2003) – cannabis, methamphetamine, cocaine, heroin, Quaaludes
- The Wonderland Experience (2002) – cannabis, LSD

== Y ==
- Y Tu Mamá También (2001) – marijuana
- Yellow Submarine (1968) - largely considered to be like an LSD trip
- The Young Nurses (1973) – cocaine
- Your Highness (2011) – an unnamed herb that cause hallucinations
- Youth In Revolt (2009) – marijuana, mushrooms

== Z ==
- Zapped! (1982) – marijuana
- Zombieland (2009) – marijuana

== See also ==
- List of films featuring hallucinogens
- List of films containing frequent marijuana use
- List of psychedelic documentaries
- Works about drugs (category)
- Category:Hood films
