= Polonia brothers =

American twin filmmakers

Mark Polonia
- Born: September 30, 1968 (age 58); Wellsboro, Pennsylvania, United States
- Occupations: Film director, film producer, screenwriter, actor

John Polonia
- Born: September 30, 1968; Wellsboro, Pennsylvania, United States
- Died: February 25, 2008 (aged 39); United States
- Occupations: Film director, film producer, screenwriter, actor

Twin brothers and filmmakers Mark Polonia and John Polonia (born September 30, 1968) founded Polonia Bros Entertainment and Cinegraphic Productions. Between them they have written, directed and produced over 40 feature films, often shot-on-video and mostly in the horror and science fiction genres, making them low-budget or even no-budget film cult icons.

When John Polonia died suddenly at the age of 39 of a heart aneurysm on February 25, 2008, Mark Polonia continued to make films.

== Life and career ==
The youngest of five siblings, the brothers were interested in and making films from a very early age. Their first commercial release was Splatter Farm, released on VHS by Donna Michele Productions in 1987, a shot-on-video offering, written, acted, directed and filmed by the teenage brothers and a high school friend.

In 1996 the brothers' alien invasion film Feeders was picked up by Blockbuster in the aftermath of the commercial success of Independence Day, and became Blockbuster's No. 1 independent-film rental for the year. Starring John Polonia and fellow-B-movie maker Jon McBride (Cannibal Campout, Woodchipper Massacre) in their first foray together, this film about an invasion of Earth by small rubbery flesh-eating monsters with no mouths marked the Polonias' first wide distribution and paved the way for future releases – perhaps 20 more of them before John's death in 2008.

Jon McBride became a regular collaborator with the brothers. The themes approached in their collaborations include killer piranhas, killer Easter Bunnies, haunted houses, trips to Mars, and assorted demons.

In 2007 they released a new and improved cut of Splatter Farm, on DVD through Camp Motion Pictures. The new version is missing a couple of the more outrageous scenes that made the original a 'cult classic'.

Within the indie film community, the brothers were known for their generosity to aspiring film-makers.

Polonia Brothers Entertainment and Cinegraphic Productions released Halloweenight, based on a screenplay by, and dedicated to the memory of, the late John Polonia, in October 2009.

According to Film Threat ”Mark Polonia is best known (if he is at all) for his ridiculous, though insanely fun, output such as Shark Encounters Of The Third Kind and Deadly Playthings. These productions intentionally trade on their low-budget schtick with absurd premises that ask the viewer to laugh and have fun, as the movie is in on the joke."

== Filmography ==
=== Films directed by Mark and John Polonia ===
- Church of the Damned; 1985, released 1985
- Hallucinations; 1986, released 2007 as an extra on Splatter Beach
- Splatter Farm; 1986, released 1987 Donna Michelle Productions, released 2007 Camp Motion Pictures
- Lethal Nightmare; Filmed 1987 – released 2013 Sub Rosa / SRS Limited Release
- Saurians; released 1994 on Polonia Brothers Entertainment
- Hellspawn; released 2003 on Brentwood 4-pack "Spawn of the Devil"
- How to Slay a Vampire; released 2004 on Brentwood 4-pack "Blood Hunt"
- Feeders; released 1996 Blockbuster, released 2003 Sub Rosa Studios
- Feeders 2: Slay Bells; released 1998 Sub Rosa Studios
- Terror House; released 2004 Sub Rosa Studios
- Nightcrawlers; currently re-released 2003 on Brentwood 4-pack "Spawn of the Devil"
- Bad Magic; released by Sub Rosa Studios
- The House That Screamed; released 2000 Sub Rosa Studios
- Dweller; re-released 2004 on Brentwood 4-pack "Sleazy Slashers"
- Dinosaur Chronicles; re-released 2004 on Brentwood 4-pack "Galaxy of Terror"
- Blood Red Planet; released 2000, re-released 2005 on Brentwood 4-pack "Galaxy of Terror"
- Night Thirst; released 2002, re-released 2004 on Brentwood 4-pack "Sleazy Slashers"
- Hellgate: The House that Screamed 2; released 2001 Sub Rosa Studios
- Gorilla Warfare: Battle of the Apes; 2002; co-directed by Jon McBride
- Preylien: Alien Predators; released 2005 on Brentwood 4-pack "Galaxy of Terror"
- Among Us; released 2004 Sub Rosa Studios
- Peter Rottentail; released 2004 Sub Rosa Studios
- Razorteeth; released 2005 Sub Rosa Studios
- Black Mass (a.k.a. Dead Knight); released Cine Excel Entertainment in Japan
- Wildcat; released Cine Excel Entertainment in Japan
- Splatter Beach; released 2007 Camp Motion Pictures
- Forest Primeval; released 2008 Tempe Entertainment
- Monster Movie; released 2008 Tempe Entertainment

=== Films by Mark Polonia only ===
==== As director ====
- Halloweenight; released 2009 Tempe Entertainment
- Army of Wolves; 2010
- E.V.E. of Destruction; released 2012 Cine Excel Entertainment
- Empire of the Apes 3D; released 2013 Sterling Entertainment
- Chainsaw Killer; released 2013 Sub Rosa Studios
- Feeders – Directors Cut; released June 2013 Sub Rosa Studios
- Camp Blood First Slaughter; released 2014 Sterling Entertainment
- Jurassic Prey (alternate title "Meateaters"); released 2015 Wild Eye Releasing
- Amityville Death House; released 2015 Retromedia
- Bigfoot Vs. Zombies; released 2016 Wild Eye Releasing
- Sharkenstein; released 2016 Wild Eye Releasing
- Amityville Exorcism; released 2017 Wild Eye Releasing
- Land Shark; released 2017 Camp Motion Pictures
- Revolt of the Empire of the Apes; released 2017 Sterling Entertainment
- Nightmare Vacation, 2017
- Camp Blood 7; released 2017 Sterling Entertainment
- Ghost of Camp Blood (Camp Blood 8); released 2018 Sterling Entertainment
- War Raiders; released 2018 Sterling Entertainment
- Frozen Sasquatch; released 2018 Sterling Entertainment
- Alien Surveillance; released 2018 Wild Eye Releasing
- Robowar (formerly Battle Bots); released 2018 Sterling Entertainment
- Camp Blood Kills; released 2019 Sterling Entertainment
- Deadly Playthings; released 2019 SRS Cinema
- Bride of the Werewolf; released 2019 Sterling Entertainment
- Amityville Island; released 2020 Wild Eye Releasing
- Shark Encounters of the Third Kind; released 2020 Wild Eye Releasing
- Return to Splatter Farm; released 2020 Wild Eye Releasing (co-directed by Jeff Kirkendall)
- Children of Camp Blood; released 2020 Sterling Entertainment
- Invasion of the Empire of the Apes; released 2021 Sterling Entertainment
- Camp Murder; released 2021 SRS Cinema
- Virus Shark; released 2021 SRS Cinema
- Dune World; released 2021 SRS Cinema
- Jurassic Shark 2: Aquapocalypse; released 2021 Wild Eye Releasing
- Noah's Shark; released 2021 Wild Eye Releasing
- Hell on the Shelf; released 2021 SRS Cinema
- Sister Krampus; released 2022 SRS Cinema
- R.I.P. Van Winkle; released 2022 Alpha Home Entertainment (on DVD as "RIP"); released 2022 Wild Eye Releasing (on streaming as "R.I.P. Van Winkle") ( co-directed by Frank Durant)
- Reel Monsters; released 2022 Camp Motion Pictures
- House Squatch; released 2022 SRS Cinema
- Feeders 3; May 2022 release Wild Eye Releasing
- Sharkula; June 2022 release Wild Eye Releasing
- Amityville in Space; July 2022 release Wild Eye Releasing
- Doll Shark; released 2022 SRS Cinema
- Motorboat; released 2023 SRS Cinema
- R.I.P. Van Winkle Part 2; released 2023 Alpha Home Entertainment (co-directed by Jeff Kirkendall)
- R.I.P. Van Winkle Part 3; released 2023 Alpha Home Entertainment (co-directed by Jeff Kirkendall)
- Cocaine Shark; released 2023 Wild Eye Releasing
- Jurassic Shark 3: Seavenge; released 2023 Wild Eye Releasing
- Yule Log; released 2023 SRS Cinema
- Snow Babes; released 2023 New Dynamic Pictures (co-directed by Tim Hatch)
- Revenge of the Empire of the Apes; released 2023 Sterling Entertainment
- Saurians 2; released 2023 Wild Eye Releasing
- Cocaine Werewolf; released 2024 Cleopatra Entertainment
- Teddiscare; released 2024 SRS Cinema
- The Last Chainsaw Massacre; released 2024 Sterling Entertainment
- Once Upon a Time in Amityville; released 2024 Wild Eye Releasing
- Pandasaurus; released 2024 Wild Eye Releasing
- Jurassic Exorcist; released 2024 Wild Eye Releasing
- One Million Babes BC; released 2024 Sterling Entertainment
- The Girl Who Wore Yellow Lace; released 2024 SRS Cinema
- Camp Blood: Clown Shark; released 2024 Sterling Entertainment (co-directed by Jeff Kirkendall)

- Mummy Shark; released 2024 Wild Eye Releasing
- The Stalking; released 2024 Wild Eye Releasing (co-directed by Jeff Kirkendall)

==== As writer and producer only ====
- Muckman; released 2009 Chemical Burn Entertainment (Directed by Brett Piper)

==== As producer only ====
- The Dark Sleep; Released April 2013 Retromedia Entertainment (Written and Directed by Brett Piper)
- Queen Crab; released 2015 Wild Eye Releasing (Written and Directed by Brett Piper)
