= Loba (Apex Legends) =

Apex Legends character

Loba Andrade
- Apex Legends character
- Loba in Apex Legends
- First appearance: Apex Legends season 5 (2020)
- Created by: Tom Casiello; Ashley Reed
- Designed by: Patrick Yeung
- Voiced by: Fryda Wolff

In-universe information
- Class: Support

Loba Andrade is a character in the 2019 video game Apex Legends, first appearing in its fifth season, released in 2020. Classified as a support-type character, in gameplay, she tends to benefit her team by helping detect rare items. Her usability has varied, with requests for her to be improved early on, as well as periods of high usability. She is a bisexual woman who flirts with characters of all genders. Throughout the various seasons of Apex Legends, she participates in a love triangle between her, Bangalore and Valkyrie, the latter two having an attraction to Loba.

She was conceived as a thief from conception, going through multiple ideas before arriving at her being a "seductively devious character". She was written by writers Tom Casiello and Ashley Reed, the latter who based her on Catwoman from Batman, the protagonist of Bayonetta, and the Shakira music video "She Wolf". She is voiced by Fryda Wolff. When a set of swimsuits for various characters were announced and Loba was not included, outcry led to Respawn giving her one, though some complained about it being not sexy enough for them.

She has been generally well received, identified as a popular character among Apex Legends fans due to her flirtatious dialogue. The love triangle was also well received, with people shipping Loba with both of them. She was criticized by Rock Paper Shotgun writer Natalie Flores, who claimed that the designers were perpetuating negative stereotypes of Latina women and bisexuals by making her "hypersexual".

== Appearances ==
In the 2019 video game Apex Legends, players control different characters called "Legends" who participate in a death game competition called the "Apex Games". Apex Legends is split up in segments called "seasons", which typically introduces updates to change how certain Legends perform, and sometimes adds new content, like Legends and maps. These seasons are typically around three months long, but can run longer. Loba first appears as a playable character as part of its fifth season in 2020. She chooses to participate in the Apex Games in order to seek revenge against Revenant, who murdered her parents, an act depicted in the trailer for the game's fourth season. The launch trailer for season five depicts her destroying a location called Skull Town in a failed attempt to kill Revenant. Throughout the storyline, Loba develops romantic feelings for a woman named Bangalore, though she distances herself after overhearing Bangalore call her "just a friend". She later entered into a relationship with another woman named Valkyrie. In July 2023, Respawn began a year-long storyline for Apex Legends Kill Code. In the third part, Loba draws her gun on Valkyrie after Valkyrie would not give her Revenant's source code, something Loba had been searching for. In season 20 of Apex Legends, Loba and Valkyrie break up. She also appears in the mobile game, Apex Legends Mobile as well as a planned inclusion in Apex Legends: The Board Game.

== Concept and creation ==
Loba is a Legend and a bisexual woman. She was proposed for inclusion as a playable character in Apex Legends as a thief character, with multiple thief archetypes considered, including "treasure hunter" and "cat burglar" before they settled on a "seductively devious character". Loba was conceived by Apex Legends writer Tom Casiello, who polled women at the game's developer, Respawn Entertainment, for their thoughts. Fellow writer Ashley Reed helped finish development of the character. Casiello stated that he used his experience writing for women in the WWE who wanted to be on equal footing to the men. Casiello added that he wanted Loba to be someone who "owned her sexuality," and "liked to look good when she wakes up in the morning". Meanwhile, Reed stated that she was inspired by Catwoman from Batman and Bayonetta from the video game of the same name, and that she used the music video for the song "She Wolf" by Shakira. Her model was designed by Patrick Yeung. Loba's face took several months to finalize, and was guided by designers Hethe Srodawa and Gary Huang. Her outfit went through multiple iterations, "ranging from haute couture with crazy ruching details to sci-fi postapocalyptic huntswoman with a hood". The final outfit was designed to both suit her gameplay style while matching her personality.

Mechanically, Loba was conceived as a "legend that manipulates loot" according to design director Jason McCord. She is a support-type character, whose abilities tend to benefit her team by allowing them to find items, particularly rare ones, more easily than other characters. She is also able to teleport. Additionally, Loba's abilities consist of teleporting by throwing a bracelet and allowing friendly or enemy teams to teleport nearby loot to their inventories.

== Reception ==
Loba has been generally well received, described as popular with players of all genders by GameSpot writer Claire Lewis. GamesRadar+ writer Hirun Cryer stated that the "hornier part" of the Apex Legends fanbase was mainly focused on Loba. Following the leak of swimsuit skins for Apex Legends characters, a lack of a swimsuit for Loba was the subject of controversy among fans, leading the developers to offer to add it if their tweet reached 10,000 likes, which was achieved. A number of fan-made concepts for Loba's swimsuit were created. Upon the reveal of her swimsuit, she received a new controversy over the outfit not being "slutty enough" according to Kotaku writer Alyssa Mercante. Mercante found the swimsuit cute, stating that as someone with thick thighs, she appreciated seeing a swimsuit that would not cause her skin to chafe. Prima Games writer Daphne Fama found her swimsuit design tasteful, stating that Loba players, herself included, would have their "credit card primed" to buy it. Lewis stated that some player have argued that Loba should not have had a skin added, with the desire to see "thirsty" Loba fans irritated.

Rock Paper Shotgun writer Natalie Flores was critical of mainstream first-person shooters' tendency to design Latina characters with "hypersexualisation, stereotypical writing, and Latinx prejudices", including Loba in this criticism. She stated that the Overwatch character Sombra was responsible, and that while she enjoyed the representation Sombra offered, she felt that Sombra became a blueprint for characters like Loba. She stated that Loba was defined by her sexuality, which resulted in her being "othered" from the rest of the female cast of Apex Legends. Flores found herself agreeing with creator Tom Casiello about wanting to have a female character who "owned her sexuality", but that how sexuality is portrayed between white and non-white women, particularly Latinas, was significantly different, arguing that her bisexuality only amplified her issues due to negative stereotypes of bisexual people being hypersexual. She claimed that Loba was frequently and "crudely" objectified by players, arguing that, in conjunction with her lacking agency as a fictional character, she comes off as less owning her sexuality and more having sexuality imposed on her. In an article for Fanbyte, Flores was also critical of her for being "entrenched in a world of crime".

Kotaku writer Emily Berry stated that Loba was her favorite character in Apex Legends. She described her as a particularly popular character, attributing this to lines like "I’m a maneater and a ladykiller". She appreciated that Loba was a confident character who would flirt with anyone of any gender; Berry acknowledged that there were valid criticisms of her being a "hypersexual Latin character", she nevertheless enjoyed how her sexuality was expressed in-game. The love triangle between Loba, Bangalore, and Valkyrie was the subject of discussion and analysis by critics. In particular, Loba and Bangalore's relationship was a popular ship among the Apex Legends community, with a "good amount of fans" believing they made more sense together than Loba and Valkyrie. Berry felt that Loba and Bangalore's relationship was an "opposites attract" situation, stating that their fighting was proof of a strong romantic chemistry. She felt that their clashing was "obviously a crush" from a shipping perspective. She noted that their dialogue became more amenable and similar after Bangalore helped her deal with Revenant, but became more distant once Bangalore indicated she and Loba were only friends. Gayming Magazine writer Aimee Hart found herself excited with the love triangle, enjoying how "hilarious" the dialogue between Loba and Bangalore sounded, knowing that the passive-aggressive shift was due to factors Bangalore was unaware of. Mercante stated that, when she first heard Loba and Valkyrie flirt in the in-game audio, she had an "ear-to-ear grin". She described the love triangle between the three as "deliciously dramatic and painfully realistic".

In October 2020, in response to a desire by fans for Loba to be given improvements to make her one of the best characters, Respawn Entertainment designer Daniel Klein explained that they wanted to keep the game focused on gunplay rather than have the metagame be defined by character abilities, giving the example of letting Loba "quickly and silently" teleporting behind an opponent. She ended up receiving some improvements following this; in November 2020, Klein attributed a rise in popularity for Loba to these buffs. Due to a lack of improvements at the start of season 23, Loba's saw "significant" drops in usage. In January 2025, Loba received multiple improvements that, according to PCGamesN writer Jamie Hore, resulted in her becoming "super strong". Game Rant writer Gozie Ibekwe felt that this may have made her too strong, stating that she was a "necessity" and that the improvements made her usage rates "skyrocket".
