= Monster movie (disambiguation) =

Monster movie is a film genre.

Monster Movie may also refer to:

- Monster Movie (band), an English dream pop band
- Monster Movie (Can album), 1969
- Monster Movie (The Rainmakers album), 2014
- Monster Movie (film), a 2008 horror comedy film

== See also ==
- Films named Monster (disambiguation)
