= The House That Screamed =

The House That Screamed may refer to:

- The House That Screamed (1969 film), Spanish psychological suspense/horror film
- The House That Screamed (2000 film), American horror film
