= Splatter Farm =

- Directed by: John Polonia; Mark Polonia; Todd Smith
- Written by: John Polonia; Mark Polonia; Todd Smith
- Produced by: J.K. Farlew
- Starring: John Polonia; Mark Polonia; Todd Smith
- Distributed by: Donna Michele Productions (VHS); Camp Motion Pictures (DVD)
- Release date: 1987
- Running time: 70 minutes
- Country: United States
- Language: English

Splatter Farm is a 1987 horror film directed by the Polonia Brothers and starring them along with Todd Smith.

== Plot ==
Twin brothers Alan and Joseph spend the summer visiting their Aunt Lacey at her secluded, run-down property, not knowing that she has a necrophilic attraction to her deceased husband, whose body she keeps in her house, and that her farmhand Jeremy dismembers local townsfolk and stores their body parts in the barn for uses later on.

== Production ==
Splatter Farm was part of the direct-to-video movement of the 1980s, which allowed film-makers with limited resources the ability to market their product.

== Release ==
The film was released on VHS in 1987 by Donna Michele Productions, and again on DVD by Camp Motion Pictures in 2007 in a somewhat modified format. A review on DVD Talk stated that the film had "an audacity that was startling in a film made by teenagers."

== Reception ==
The film is said to have been deliberately shot so as to seem amateurish.

== Sequel ==
The sequel Return to Splatter Farm was produced in Pennsylvania in 2019. It was directed by Mark Polonia and Jeff Kirkendall. The film was released on 11/10/2020. The story picks up 33 years after the events of the first film.
