= Woodchipper Massacre =

- Directed by: Jon McBride
- Written by: Jon McBride
- Produced by: Jon McBride
- Starring: Jon McBride; Denice Edeal; Tom Casiello; Patricia McBride
- Edited by: Lee Insler; Jon McBride; Joe Podesta Jr.
- Music by: Tony Diliberti; Michael O'Keefe; David Toy
- Distributed by: Donna Michelle Productions; Camp Motion Pictures (DVD)
- Release date: 1988
- Running time: 90 minutes
- Country: United States

Woodchipper Massacre is a 1988 American horror comedy Z movie written and directed by Jon McBride, who also directed Cannibal Campout, released that same year. The film was shot-on-video in Connecticut.

In the film, three siblings are left in the care of their religious fanatic aunt. When she tries to confiscate her nephew's knife, she is fatally stabbed with the knife. The stabbing was accidental, but the siblings commit further crimes in order to cover up her death.

== Plot ==
Jon (Jon McBride), Denice (Denice Edeal), and Tom (Tom Casiello) are three kids whose father goes away for a business meeting. He leaves them in care of their Aunt Tess (Patricia McBride) who is a militaristic religious extremist who only lets the kids do homework and chores while preaching to them against dating, staying up late, movies, music, and why their lifestyle is wrong. Tom gets an official Rambo Hunting Knife in the mail and Tess will not let him have it. They get into a physical struggle over Tom keeping it, and Aunt Tess accidentally gets fatally stabbed in the stomach.

The three kids then dismember her body, placing it in the freezer. They then take her body out of the freezer so they can put her in the woodchipper. They grind her body to shreds. They then think it's over. But then, Tess's son, Kim (Kim Baily), who was recently released from prison, comes to their home and is told that his mother is "not here" and has "left." He is involved in some kind of money wiring deal and came there to get money from his mother. He decides to take monetary value from the children's home and threatens them if they don't give it to him. Denice and Tom trick him out to the "expensive" woodchipper, plotting to throw him inside, too. They lure Kim to look inside. Tom turns it on and Kim is pushed in by Jon.

Jon drives Kim's car to the airport to hide the evidence and hitches a ride back. Denice and Tom are raking and mowing the lawn which Jon promised his father he would have done by the time he returned from the business meeting. With only a little bit of time before their father's return, Jon assists in the raking and mowing. The father then arrives home and sees his children welcoming him on the driveway. All appears normal, and the children get away with the crime.

The camera pans back to the woodchips on the ground and Aunt Tess's bloody ring is lying on the ground when the film ends.

== Cast ==
- Jon McBride as Jon
- Denice Edeal as Denice
- Tom Casiello as Tom
- Patricia McBride as Aunt Tess
- Kim Bailey as Kim
- Perren Page as Father

== Crew ==
Jon McBride acted in, wrote, directed, edited, and composed the score for Woodchipper Massacre. The film took 2 months to shoot. It was finished in 1988.

== Release ==
=== Home media ===
Woodchipper Massacre was released on VHS in 1990. It was released on DVD in early 2007.
