= Halloweenight =

2009 American film

HalloweeNight
- DVD cover
- Directed by: Mark Polonia
- Screenplay by: Mark Polonia
- Story by: John Polonia
- Produced by: Matthew Satterly
- Cinematography: Brett Piper; Matthew S. Smith
- Edited by: Mark Polonia
- Music by: Jon McBride
- Production company: Polonia Brothers Entertainment
- Distributed by: CineGraphic Productions
- Release date: October 8, 2009
- Running time: 85 minutes
- Country: United States
- Language: English

HalloweeNight is a 2009 American horror film directed by Mark Polonia of the Polonia brothers.

== Plot ==
A school janitor devises an evil scarecrow to exact revenge on those who have tormented him, but then loses control of his fiendish creation.

== Cast ==
- Cindy Wheeler
- Todd Carpenter
- Ken Van Sant
- Brian Berry
- Bob Dennis
- Dave Fife
- Matt Satterly as killer straw man
- S.A. Diasparra

== Production ==
Made on a budget of $4,000, this film marks the first created by Polonia Brothers Entertainment since the death of John Polonia. The movie based on a screenplay by John Polonia and is dedicated to his memory. Matt Satterly, the producer of the film, who also played in it, died soon after filming was complete.

== Release ==
The film was released on October 8, 2009 by Cinegraphic Productions and Polonia Bros. Entertainment.

== Reception ==
The Italian website Horror e Dintorni gave the film a mixed review, praising the effort (that they deem above Polonia’s usual standards) but not the result.

== See also ==
- List of films set around Halloween
