= Camp Blood (film series) =

American horror film series

- Created by: Brad Sykes
- Original work: Camp Blood (1999)
- Years: 1999–2025

Films and television
- Film(s): 16

Camp Blood is a series of American direct-to-video slasher films that began in 1999 with the release of the original Camp Blood. The film was directed by Brad Sykes and produced by David Sterling. It follows a group of campers who are stalked by a masked killer known as "The Clown" and was part of a wave of low-budget horror films that emerged after the success of Scream (1996). Over the years, the franchise has expanded to include multiple sequels and spin-offs, and has developed a small cult following among fans of ultra-low-budget horror.

== Reception ==
The Camp Blood series has generally received negative reviews from critics. The original 1999 film was criticized for its low production values, predictable plot, and minimal special effects. On Rotten Tomatoes, it holds a 12% score, reflecting limited critical approval. Nevertheless, this franchise has developed a small cult following among fans of ultra-low-budget horror, and its continued production over two decades makes it a notable example of direct-to-video horror cinema.

== Films ==
Year	Film	Director	Writer	Producer
1999	Camp Blood	Brad Sykes	Brad Sykes	David Sterling
2000	Camp Blood 2	Brad Sykes	Brad Sykes	David Sterling
2004	Within The Woods	Brad Sykes	Brad Sykes	Josephina Sykes
2014	Camp Blood First Slaughter	Mark Polonia	Mark Polonia	David Sterling
2016	Camp Blood 4	Dustin Ferguson	Dustin Ferguson	David Sterling
2016	Camp Blood 5	Dustin Ferguson	Dustin Ferguson	David Sterling
2016	Camp Blood 666	Ted Moehring	Monte Hunter	David Sterling
2017	It Kills: Camp Blood 7	Mark Polonia	Amy Suzuki	David Sterling
2018	Ghost of Camp Blood	Mark Polonia	Alan Wyoming	David Sterling
2020	Camp Blood 8: Revelations	Dennis Devine	Dennis Devine	David Sterling
2020	Children of Camp Blood	Mark Polonia	Lester Thord	David Sterling
2023	Camp Blood 666 Part 2: Exorcism Of The Clown	Will Collazo Jr.	Julie Anne Prescott	David Sterling
2023	Camp Blood X: Animated	Jason Peri		David Sterling
2024	Camp Blood Clown Shark	Mark Polonia Jeff Kirkendall	Jeff Kirkendall	David Sterling
2024	Camp Blood 9: Bride of Blood	Will Collazo		David Sterling
2025	Camp Blood Christmas	Matthew Dilts-Williams	Matthew Dilts-Williams	David Sterling

== Personnel ==
The original writer of Camp Blood was Brad Sykes.

Mark Polonia has been on and off with the franchise, directing five of the Camp Blood films over the span of a decade.

Dustin Ferguson was tasked with filming both the fourth and fifth Camp Blood back-to-back. In an interview from early 2016 with Mike Haberfelner, Ferguson is quoted as saying these movies were a part of a six-movie deal with franchises current producer, David Sterling. A third Camp Blood movie was expected to be assigned to this deal, however, that never happened.

As the most recent director in the franchise, Camp Blood Christmas is the only full-length film Matthew Dilts-Williams has taken the lead on.

Jennifer Ritchkoff was the leading actress in the first two Camp Blood films. Many reviews find her performance to be standout, and possibly above her pay grade. However, these movies make up her only filmography on Rotten Tomatoes.
