= Tom Casiello =

American soap opera writer

Tom Casiello is an American writer and former actor. Casiello has written content for three distinct entertainment genres. Casiello also acted when he was a kid in the 1988 horror film Woodchipper Massacre, directed by Jon McBride.

Casiello began his career as a soap opera writer, working on a number of shows as a staff writer.

He was then hired by WWE, where he served as the creative writer from 2011 to 2016.

In recent years, Casiello has written for Gen-Z Media, where he was head writer for Six Minutes, and its sequel, Six Minutes: Out of Time.

In 2018, Casiello joined the writing team at Respawn Entertainment and was part of the creation of the first seventeen Legends in Apex Legends. He also co-wrote the book Pathfinder's Quest, with Manny Hagopian and Ashley Reed, as well as the Dark Horse Comics mini-series, Apex Legends: Overtime.

In 2021, he became Narrative Director at Gravity Well Games, and is currently working on that studio's first game.

== Positions held ==
Another World

- Writers’ Intern (1998–1999)

As the World Turns

- Breakdown Writer (2000–2002)
- Assistant to the Writers (1999–2002)

Days of Our Lives

- Associate Head Writer (January 22, 2007 – January 24, 2008)

One Life to Live

- Breakdown Writer (October 27, 2004 – August 1, 2006)
- Script Writer (September 22, 2004 – October 26, 2004) [Note: On air credit error made by the show – Casiello did not write any scripts]

The Young and the Restless

- Breakdown Writer (April 20, 2009 – May 27, 2011)
- Occasional Breakdown Writer (September 6, 2006 – October 25, 2006)

Apex Legends

- Writer.

WWE

- Creative Writer (April 17, 2011 – December 9, 2016)

== Awards and nominations ==
Daytime Emmy Awards

- NOMINATION (2006; Best Writing; One Life to Live)
- WIN (2001 & 2002; Best Writing; As The World Turns)

Writers Guild of America Award

- NOMINATION (2005 Season; One Life to Live)
