= Splatter Beach =

- Directed by: John Polonia; Mark Polonia
- Written by: John Polonia
- Produced by: John Polonia; Mark Polonia
- Starring: Erin Brown
- Cinematography: Brett Piper
- Edited by: John Polonia; Mark Polonia
- Music by: Jon McBride
- Release date: 2007
- Country: United States
- Language: English

Splatter Beach is a 2007 low-budget horror comedy film directed by the Polonia brothers and starring Erin Brown, Erika Smith, Alison Whitney, Brice Kennedy, Ken Van Sant and Dave Fife. It was released on DVD by Camp Motion Pictures.

The screenplay concerns a reporter who hopes to write a story on a series of disappearances that have plagued a local beach, and who finds instead a sea monster in full rubbery attire.
