= Amityville Death House =

- Film poster
- Directed by: Mark Polonia
- Screenplay by: John Oak Dalton
- Produced by: Mark Polonia
- Starring: Eric Roberts
- Cinematography: J.K. Milligan
- Edited by: Mark Polonia
- Music by: Tony Proffer
- Production company: Polonia Brothers Entertainment
- Distributed by: Monogram Pictures
- Release date: 24 February 2015 (United States)
- Running time: 75 minutes
- Country: United States
- Language: English

Amityville Death House is a 2015 American horror film directed by Mark Polonia, written by John Oak Dalton, and starring Eric Roberts. It was released direct-to-video, and is the twelfth film to be inspired by Jay Anson's 1977 novel The Amityville Horror.

== Plot ==
During the 17th century, a white witch named Abigail Wilmont moved to Amityville, New York after being run out of Salem, Massachusetts. When Abigail's magic failed to save the life of a sick child, she was blamed for causing the child's illness in the first place, and lynched on the outskirts of Amityville. In the present, a warlock called the Dark Lord sets out to avenge Abigail's death by using a tarot deck and a Book of the Dead to resurrect Abigail as a semi-corporeal entity that he unleashes on Amityville.

While driving back home from a humanitarian trip to Florida, Tiffany Raymond and her friends Aric, Bree, and Dig stop in Amityville to visit Tiffany's grandmother, Florence. Florence, whose physical and mental health have been deteriorating ever since she found a diary that belonged to Abigail, lives in Abigail's old home, which has the same half moon-shaped upper windows as 112 Ocean Avenue. As Tiffany and her friends tend to Florence and read the diary, they are spied on by Abigail, who has begun slaughtering the descendants of the villagers who killed her in the 17th century. The descendants include Florence and Tiffany.

After murdering five of the other descendants, Abigail snaps Florence's neck, and mesmerizes Aric and Dig into attacking Bree and Tiffany. During the struggle, Tiffany's blouse is ripped open to reveal that she has six breasts, a sign that she is a witch, according to the Dark Lord. Tiffany uses her own magic to bring Aric and Dig back to their senses, and together they attack Abigail, who fatally wounds Dig before being severely injured by Aric. Abigail proceeds to possess Florence's corpse, and then Bree. Abigail's possession causes Bree to mutate into a spider-like monster that kills Aric. Tiffany, having discerned that Abigail's power is tied to her diary, sets the book on fire; this causes Florence's house to explode, which attracts the attention of the passing Sheriff Steve McGrath. One of the diary's pages is prevented from burning up completely by the oblivious McGrath.

Since her diary was not completely destroyed, Abigail was not vanquished, and the film ends with the reveal that she has possessed Tiffany.

== Cast ==
- Kyrsten St. Pierre as Tiffany Raymond
- Michael Merchant as Aric
- Cassandra Hayes as Bree
- Houston Baker as Dig
- Ken Van Sant as Sheriff Steve McGrath
- Danielle Donahue as Charlayne White
- Steve Diasparra as Wardell
- Kathryn Sue Young as Veronica
- Jeff Kirkendall as Zeke
- Yolie Canales as Florence Raymond
- Austin Dragovich as Gilly
- Todd Carpenter as Ernest
- Mark Polonia as Deputy Sullivan
- Eric Roberts as The Warlock

== Reception ==
Tex Hula ranked Amityville Death House as the fifth worst out of 21 Amityville films that he reviewed for Ain't It Cool News. Hula noted that the film's poster and the sequence in which Bree (Cassandra Hayes) transforms into a spider-like creature were the only impressive things about it, and further opined that the film's acting was even worse than that in The Amityville Haunting.
