= Cocaine Shark =

- The United States film poster
- Kanizame Shakurabu
- Directed by: Mark Polonia
- Written by: Bando Glutz
- Produced by: Rob Hauschild
- Starring: Samantha Coolidge; Ryan Dalton; Natalie Himmelberger; Titus Himmelberger; Jeff Kirkendall; Noyes J. Lawton; Ken Van Sant; Kevin Coolidge
- Cinematography: Paul Alan Steele
- Edited by: Mark Polonia
- Production company: Polonia Brothers Entertainment
- Distributed by: Wild Eye Releasing
- Release dates: January 29, 2023 (Japan); July 7, 2023 (United States)
- Countries: Japan; United States
- Language: English

Cocaine Shark is a 2023 English-language Japanese horror film directed by Mark Polonia. Originally released in Japan under the title Kanizame Shakurabu, it was renamed in order to profit from the release of Cocaine Bear.

== Premise ==
A drug lord creates a new drug called HT25, which is derived from sharks kept in a secret laboratory. The extraction of the drug causes unexpected mutations in the sharks, and after an explosion in the laboratory, the mutated sharks are released and begin wreaking havoc. The film features various mutated creatures, none of which are actually sharks on cocaine as the title suggests.

== Cast ==
- Samantha Coolidge as Meagan
- Ryan Dalton as Fuente
- Natalie Himmelberger as Pershephone
- Titus Himmelberger as Neil
- Jeff Kirkendall as Captain Dillon
- Noyes J. Lawton as Fuente's Goon
- Ken Van Sant as Gaurisco
- Kevin Coolidge as Louis

== Production and release ==
After the announcement of the film Cocaine Bear, which was based on a true story, users on social media discussed a potential sequel film called "Cocaine Shark" based on a story reporting that cocaine was intercepted in the Pacific Ocean by New Zealand authorities. When asked about the possibility of the film, Elizabeth Banks, the director of Cocaine Bear, expressed interest in directing it.

Before Elizabeth Banks had an opportunity to create the film, it was created by Mark Polonia. The film debuted on January 29, 2023, in Japan under the title Kanizame Shakurabu, or Crab Shark. The film was rebranded to Cocaine Shark in order to profit from the release of Cocaine Bear. In the United States, the film was distributed by Wild Eye Releasing and released on July 7, 2023.

== Reception ==
Cocaine Shark was received negatively by critics. It has been described as "terrible and lazy", with criticism aimed at the plot, camerawork, acting, lighting, and special effects. It has also been criticized as uninteresting, with dialogue taking up far more time than the creatures.

== See also ==
- Cocaine Crabs from Outer Space
- Methgator
- Cocaine Bear
