= Sharkenstein =

2016 film

- Movie Poster
- Directed by: Mark Polonia
- Written by: J.K. Farlew
- Produced by: Rob Hauschild
- Starring: Greta Volkova; Ken Van Sant
- Cinematography: Alan Wyoming
- Music by: Greg Stanina
- Distributed by: Wild Eye Releasing
- Release date: August 16, 2016
- Running time: 73 minutes
- Country: United States
- Language: English

Sharkenstein is a sharksploitation film from 2016 directed by Mark Polonia and was written by J.K. Farlew.

== Premise ==
In World War II there was an attempt to weaponize sharks. The Third Reich shut down the efforts before they could complete the experiment. Now, more than half a century later in a small ocean town citizens are terrorized by a mysterious and blood thirsty creature, one that seems to be a monster created by different parts of the most fierce sharks to ever have lived. Dr. Klaus attempts to create the ultimate killing machine by using human organs and body parts.

== Synopsis ==
Three friends travel to Katzman Cove for a boating trip only to find the town terrorized by an abominable Nazi super shark.

== Cast ==
- Greta Volkova as Madge
- Ken Van Sant as Duke Lawson
- Titus Himmelberger as Coop
- James Carolus as Skip
- Jeff Kirkendall as Klaus
- Yolie Canales as Angry Mother
- Bruce Applegate as Doctor
- Kathryn Sue Young as Bonnie Boom Boom

== Reception ==
NerdSpan wrote, "Flawed, but not entirely in the right way."
