= Cash Crop (film) =

- Film poster
- Directed by: Adam Ross
- Written by: Adam Ross
- Release date: October 1, 2010
- Country: United States
- Language: English

Cash Crop is a documentary film by writer-director Adam Ross about cannabis' economic impact in the U.S. state of California.
