= Cocaine Crabs from Outer Space =

- Directed by: Chuck Magee
- Starring: Chuck Magee; Kat Andrews; Brent G. Baker; Douglass Hoffman; Bo Bolin
- Production companies: SRS Cinema; Wounded Rat Productions
- Release date: November 4, 2022 (Salem's Historic Grand Theatre)
- Country: United States
- Language: English
- Budget: No-budget

Cocaine Crabs from Outer Space is a 2022 American no-budget comedy horror film directed by and starring Chuck Magee.

== Premise ==
After two crabs from space land on Earth, a group of fraternity boys capture them and force-feed them cocaine, which triggers a killer instinct in the crabs, leading to a series of mysterious deaths. Detective Charlie Reese (played by Chuck Magee) suspects crabs, but his theory is dismissed by his captain. Determined to prove his theory, Reese teams up with a pet store employee named Alex Bailey to stop the crabs' cocaine-fueled rampage.

== Cast ==
- Chuck Magee as Charlie Reese
- Kat Andrews as Alex Bailey
- Brent G. Baker as Police Captain
- Douglass Hoffman as DJ Cowspank
- Bo Bolin as The Cocaine King

== Production and release ==
Magee said that the idea for the film came to him while showering, and that he was inspired by the films of Steven Spielberg.

The film was shot on location in Salem, Oregon. It featured local actors from the city, mostly consisting of Magee's friends, or friends of Magee's friends. The film took almost two years to produce.

The film premiered at Salem's Historic Grand Theatre on November 4, 2022. Pre-sales for the Blu-ray release began on June 1, 2023.

== See also ==
- Cocaine Bear
- Cocaine Shark
- Meth Gator
