= Jon McBride (filmmaker) =

American film director

- Born: Jon McBride; 1960 (age 64–65); United States
- Occupations: Film director, producer, screenwriter, actor

Jon McBride is an American Z movie director, producer, screenwriter and actor.

McBride made various films in collaboration with the Polonia brothers. He is the director of Cannibal Campout (with Tom Fisher) and Woodchipper Massacre.

== Filmography ==
Year	Film	Director	Producer	Composer	Editor	Writer	Actor	Role
1988	Cannibal Campout	Yes	Yes		Yes	Yes	Yes	Jon
1989	Woodchipper Massacre	Yes	Yes	Yes	Yes	Yes	Yes	Jon
1989	Blades						Yes	Don's friend
1996	Feeders	Yes					Yes	Derek
1998	Terror House	Yes	Yes	Yes			Yes	N/A
1998	Feeders 2: Slay Bells						Yes	Derek
2000	Blood Red Planet	Yes	Yes				Yes	Derek
2001	Hellgate: The House That Screamed 2	Yes	Yes				Yes	Professor Pollenfax
2002	Gorilla Warfare: Battle of the Apes	Yes	Yes					
2002	Dweller	Yes					Yes	Jake
2002	The Alien Conspiracy: Grey Skies						Yes	N/A
2002	Night Thirst	Yes	Yes				Yes	Van Roth
2003	Holla If I Kill You			Yes				
2004	Peter Rottentail			Yes				
2004	Dinosaur Chronicles			Yes				
2004	Holla If I Kill You	Yes	Yes	Yes			Yes	Wayne Beaubier
2005	Black Mass	Yes	Yes	Yes				
2005	Razorteeth			Yes				
2007	Splatter Beach			Yes				
2007	WildCat			Yes				
2009	Halloweenight			Yes				
