= Commonwealth University =

Commonwealth University may refer to:

- Commonwealth University of Pennsylvania
  - Commonwealth University-Bloomsburg
  - Commonwealth University-Lock Haven
  - Commonwealth University-Mansfield
- Union Commonwealth University, Barbourville, Kentucky
- Virginia Commonwealth University, Richmond, Virginia

== See also ==
- Association of Commonwealth Universities
- University of the Commonwealth Caribbean, Kingston, Jamaica
