= Feeders (film) =

1996 American science fiction film

- VHS cover
- Directed by: John Polonia; Mark Polonia; Jon McBride
- Written by: Mark Polonia
- Produced by: Albert Z. White
- Starring: Jon McBride; John Polonia; Sebastian Barran; Melissa Torpy; Maria Russo; Todd Carpenter; Gary LeBlanc
- Cinematography: Arthur Daniels
- Edited by: Paul Alan
- Production companies: Polonia Brothers Entertainment; Intercoast Video
- Distributed by: Blockbuster Video
- Release date: 1996
- Running time: 68 minutes
- Country: United States
- Language: English
- Budget: $500

Feeders is a 1996 American science fiction horror film written and directed by John and Mark Polonia and Jon McBride. A shot-on-video (SOV) film made on a low budget of $500, Feeders follows two friends, Derek (McBride) and Bennett (John Polonia), on a road trip; while travelling through Pennsylvania, the duo encounter small extraterrestrials who have landed on Earth in order to hunt and eat humans.

Feeders was released direct-to-video in 1996, with Blockbuster Video acquiring it for rental. It was one of the most popular independent film rentals at Blockbuster that year. In 1998, a Christmas-themed sequel, Feeders 2: Slay Bells, was released. A third film, Feeders 3: The Final Meal, was released in 2022.

== Plot ==
In the morning in a Pennsylvania forest, Ranger Gordon witnesses what he believes to be a meteor streaking through the sky. The meteor is actually a flying saucer piloted by small gray aliens, which lands in the woods. After investigating the crash site, Gordon returns to his compact SUV, where he is attacked and killed by two aliens who eat his flesh.

Photographer Derek and his friend Bennett are travelling through Pennsylvania on a road trip. After taking photos of the aftermath of a flood that destroyed a town, the duo decide to camp in the nearby woods. While at a gas station, Bennett meets a woman named Michelle, and sets up a double date with her and her friend Donna, Gordon's daughter. In the forest, the aliens attack a fisherman. Disoriented, the fisherman stumbles out into the road, where he is accidentally struck by Bennett and Derek in their car. They drive him to a clinic in town as he mumbles about "little men". At the clinic, a doctor pronounces the man dead.

Leaving the clinic, Bennett and Derek head to the forest to set up their campsite. Bennett hears the sounds of the aliens growling in the woods, and after he and Derek observe a flying saucer in the sky, they decide to flee the area. Elsewhere in town, the aliens have been wreaking havoc: at the clinic, an alien decapitates the doctor and feeds on his severed head; Donna, after learning about their date with Derek and Bennett from Michelle over the phone, is attacked and partially devoured by an alien in her garage; and Michelle, having arrived at Donna's house, discovers Donna's corpse and kills two of the aliens.

Derek and Bennett attempt to drive away, but their car fails to start. An alien spits an acidic substance on Derek's hand, and Bennett kills the alien by smashing it with a rock. By nightfall, Derek and Bennett have taken refuge in a house whose residents have been killed by the aliens. An alien attempts to attack them but Bennett kills it with a sickle. Bennett steps outside of the house and is abducted by a flying saucer, where he is tortured by the aliens.

Bennett is released from the flying saucer, along with a clone of himself created by the aliens. Unsure which Bennett is the original, Derek kills one of them with the sickle, only to realize that he has killed the actual Bennett, rather than the doppelgänger. Derek flees on foot back into town, as several more flying saucers converge on the Earth in a widescale alien invasion.

== Cast ==
- Jon McBride as Derek
- John Polonia as Bennett
- Sebastian Barran as Doctor
- Maria Russo as Donna
- Melissa Torpy as Michelle
- Todd Carpenter as Fisherman
- Gary LeBlanc as Ranger Gordon

== Production ==
Feeders was originally conceived under the title Invasion. After determining that the film would have a budget of $500 and seeing the alien puppets that would be used, Mark Polonia rewrote the film to be smaller in scale, and later stated, "We intentionally tried to make a campy throwback (if I can use that word) to the sci-fi films of the '50s, except theirs turned out better." Feeders was filmed over the course of around five days.

== Release ==
Feeders was acquired for distribution by the Blockbuster Video chain of video rental stores in 1996, shortly after the release of the big-budget Hollywood blockbuster film Independence Day. It was one of the most popular independent films rented at Blockbuster that year.

Mark Polonia later recalled, "Feeders was probably one out of a few successful films because that was a Blockbuster video, when at the time, [Blockbuster] was the hugest retail rental chain. They picked it up so it was all over the United States. This was the most successful independent film of the year. We probably sold 8,000 copies to just them. For 1996, a movie shot for next to nothing, it's a success story."

== Reception ==
In 2000, Richard "Lowtax" Kyanka, creator of the website Something Awful, referred to Feeders as the "Worst fucking movie you'll ever see," writing: "Even if this film had a new director, cast, budget, script, plot, and special effects, it would still suck. If you were to place this movie within 50 feet of a really good video, it would actually create a suck vacuum that would cause the other film to become unbelievably shitty." Kyanka offered an invitation for McBride and Mark Polonia to respond to the review, which they accepted; their response was published on Something Awful in 2003.

Reviewing Feeders in 2004, Bill Gibron of DVD Talk called the film "dopey in that kind of pure honest desire to entertain manner of mischief that flows directly from a love of bad b-movies", and referred to the aliens as "absolutely hilarious and ridiculous".

== Home media ==
On March 30, 2004, Feeders was released on DVD as a double feature with Feeders 2: Slay Bells by Sub Rosa Studios. Feeders was also released on a double feature DVD with the 2004 film Among Us, also directed by the Polonia brothers and McBride.

== Sequels ==
Feeders spawned a Christmas-themed sequel titled Feeders 2: Slay Bells, released in 1998. A third film, Feeders 3: The Final Meal, was shot in Tioga County, Pennsylvania, in 2020, and released in 2022.
