= The House That Screamed (2000 film) =

- Directed by: Polonia brothers
- Produced by: John Poloina; Mark Poloina
- Release date: 2000
- Country: United States
- Language: English

The House That Screamed is a 2000 horror film by the Polonia brothers, released by Sub Rosa Studios.

The film follows a writer (Bob Dennis), attempting to escape from the recent tragedy in his life by throwing himself into his work, only to discover a haunted house.

It was followed by a sequel, Hellgate: the House That Screamed 2.

== Reception ==
A review of the DVD stated: "Wildly erratic, the transfer for The House that Screamed depends entirely on the lighting used from scene to scene. The opening sequence, a wildly gratuitous shower scene followed by a hamfisted crawl explaining the role of ghosts in the year 2000, does not bode well thanks to an abundance of noise and grain."
