= Camp Blood First Slaughter =

- Film poster
- Directed by: Mark Polonia
- Written by: Mark Polonia
- Produced by: David S. Serling
- Music by: Ghost
- Release date: May 20, 2014 (United States)
- Country: United States

Camp Blood First Slaughter is a 2014 American direct to DVD slasher film, written and directed by Mark Polonia.

== Plot ==
The infamous Camp Blood is open for business! A college assignment sends a group of young students deep into the woods, and deeper into terror. One by one, a masked killer begins to murder them in gruesome fashion. They say the 3rd time is the charm, and Camp Blood 3 has thrice the slice! Stay out of the woods unless you want to be the next victim of the Camp Blood killer.

== Cast ==
- Kelsey Kaufmann as Christi
- Houston Baker as Victor
- Joshua Pollitt as Harvey
- Sarah Ryan as Sasha (as Sarah Elizabeth)
- Ashley Wray as Marcy
- Cindy Wheeler as Professor Mallory
- Steve Diasparra as The Figure / The Mayor
- Kan Vansant as Sheriff (as Ken Vansant)
- Jeff Kirkendall as Fletcher
- Elizabeth Costanzo as Brianna (as Elizabeth Costanzo)

== Reception ==
DVD Review said "The best compliment that I can give the film is that Mark Polonia and his team tried to do the best that they could with the given budget and resources. They clearly love the genre and set out to try and do something that was in the B-movie realm and in the “so bad that it’s good” category. Needless to say, they failed spectacularly".

A very negative review at Bloody Disgusting stated: "Aside from the flat acting, the stupidity of the characters and the ruining of gore effects with overblown CGI aside (seriously, using the same bloodsplat effect for practically every kill?), the biggest no-no is forgetting your main premise of the film: the found footage gimmick. Take your found footage (which for some reason contains shots that have the perfect angle when the camera is dropped), but edit it together with cutaways and throw in footage of the killer’s POV. Also, don’t forget cliché video glitches and fast-forwarding, which rarely do much of anything."
