= Monster Movie (film) =

- Directed by: Polonia brothers
- Produced by: John Polonia; Mark Polonia
- Starring: Mark Polonia; John Polonia; Brian Berry; Todd Carpenter
- Release date: 2008
- Country: United States
- Language: English

Monster Movie is a 2008 horror comedy film by the Polonia brothers. It marks the last film created by the filmmaking duo before John Polonia's death at age 39.

== Plot ==
Four friends find more than they bargained for on a trip to the country.
