= Cannibal Campout =

1988 horror film directed by Jon McBride and Tom Fisher

- DVD released by Camp Motion Pictures
- Directed by: Tom Fisher; Jon McBride
- Screenplay by: Jon McBride
- Produced by: Tom Fisher; Jon McBride
- Starring: Jon McBride; Carrie Lindell; Gene Robbins; Joseph Salhab; Richard Marcus; Amy Chludzinski; Christopher A. Granger
- Cinematography: Tom Fisher
- Edited by: Jon McBride
- Music by: Christopher A. Granger
- Production company: Intercoast Productions
- Distributed by: Donna Michelle Productions
- Release date: September 1988 (United States)
- Running time: 88 minutes
- Country: United States
- Language: English

Cannibal Campout is a 1988 horror film written and directed by Jon McBride, and co-directed by Tom Fisher.

== Plot ==
While out for a jog in the community of Redston, a woman named Nancy is hacked to death with an felling axe by a man wearing a fighter pilot helmet. Later, two couples consisting of Jon and Carrie, and Amy and Chris, head to Redston to camp out for the weekend, but on the way there they encounter a pair of hillbillies named Rich and Gene, who attack them.

After the encounter with the backwoods duo (revealed to be the brothers of the fighter helmet-wearing man, Joe) the quartet set up near some abandoned cabins, while the hillbillies murder would-be pranksters John and Ray. After wandering off alone to get her cigarettes, Carrie is killed by Gene and Joe, and her friends are captured while looking for her. Jon is knocked out in a fight with Joe, and disemboweled and eaten by the brothers, who force feed the other captives some of his innards. When Gene and Joe leave with Jon's body, Rich butchers Chris, and tries to rape Amy, but is stabbed with his own knife, and left for dead.

Traversing the wilderness, Amy encounters Joe, and during the ensuing scuffle pulls off his helmet, revealing his disfigured face. After Joe runs off, Gene and the recovered Rich recapture Amy, and cut out and eat her unborn child. An unknown amount of time later, the brothers are shown partaking in an unsuccessful hunt, and when Rich suggests they merely get fast food, Gene scolds him, reminding him that they promised their mother they would never eat those chemical-soaked foods. When Rich continues to complain, Gene and Joe become annoyed, and seemingly decide to eat him.

== Cast ==
- Jon McBride as Jon
- Amy Chludzinski as Amy
- Christopher A. Granger as Chris
- Richard Marcus as Rich
- Gene Robbins as Gene
- Carrie Lindell as Carrie
- Joseph Salhab as Joe
- Nancy Sciarra as Nancy
- Ray Angelic as Ray
- John Farrell as John

== Reception ==
A three out of five was awarded by Bloody Disgusting, which stated "The joy of this film is in the sheer audacity of the filmmakers who managed to get this project on the shelves of mom and pop shops all over the country". DVD Verdict said that while Cannibal Campout was bad, it was enjoyable due to the gore, and "the lovable cheapness of the whole thing".

DVD Talk gave the film a one and half out of five, writing "Cheap and chintzy is one thing. Low-end and insipid is another, but what's on display here is simply too stupid to believe" and "McBride makes his villains so garishly weird, stupid and gross that it seems he's going for sort of a Texas Chainsaw Massacre tone, but the actors are so rotten, and the gore is so blatantly stupid-looking, that any sense of dread or discomfort is replaced by feelings of exasperated incredulity".
