= Cocaine Bear =

2023 film directed by Elizabeth Banks

- Theatrical release poster
- Directed by: Elizabeth Banks
- Written by: Jimmy Warden
- Produced by: Phil Lord Christopher Miller; Elizabeth Banks; Max Handelman; Brian Duffield; Aditya Sood
- Starring: Keri Russell; O'Shea Jackson Jr.; Christian Convery; Alden Ehrenreich; Brooklynn Prince; Isiah Whitlock Jr.; Margo Martindale; Ray Liotta
- Cinematography: John Guleserian
- Edited by: Joel Negron
- Music by: Mark Mothersbaugh
- Production companies: Lord Miller Productions; Brownstone Productions; Jurassic Party Productions
- Distributed by: Universal Pictures
- Release date: February 24, 2023 (United States)
- Running time: 95 minutes
- Country: United States
- Language: English
- Budget: $30–35 million
- Box office: $90 million

Cocaine Bear (released as Crazy Bear in some countries) is a 2023 American black comedy horror film directed by Elizabeth Banks and written by Jimmy Warden. It is loosely inspired by the true story of the "Cocaine Bear", an American black bear that ingested several kilograms of a bag containing about 75 lb (34 kg) of lost cocaine. The film stars Keri Russell, O'Shea Jackson Jr., Christian Convery, Alden Ehrenreich, Brooklynn Prince, Isiah Whitlock Jr., Margo Martindale, Jesse Tyler Ferguson, and Ray Liotta—to whom the film is dedicated, following his death in May 2022.

Cocaine Bear was released in the United States on February 24, 2023, by Universal Pictures. The film received mixed reviews from critics and grossed $90 million against a production budget of $30–35 million.

== Plot ==
In 1985, drug smuggler Andrew C. Thornton II drops a shipment of cocaine from his plane. He attempts to parachute out with the last drug-filled duffel bag, but knocks himself unconscious on the doorframe and falls to his death. In the Chattahoochee–Oconee National Forest, a large female American black bear eats some of the cocaine. Becoming highly aggressive, it attacks hikers Elsa and Olaf, killing the former.

Andrew's body lands in Knoxville, Tennessee, where he is identified by Bob, a local detective. He concludes that the cocaine is likely from St. Louis drug kingpin Syd White, and the remainder is missing. Meanwhile, Syd orders his widowed son Eddie and fixer Daveed to help him retrieve the cocaine.

In northeast Georgia, middle schooler Dee Dee lives with her mother, nurse Sari. Dee Dee skips school with her best friend Henry in order to paint a picture of a waterfall in the forest. On the trail to the falls, they find a lost brick of cocaine and ingest some, before being attacked by the bear.

Eddie and Daveed arrive in Georgia to recover the cocaine, as does Bob. At the forest station, Daveed gets into a fight with local delinquents Ponytail, Vest and Stache. He subdues the trio, and Stache takes Daveed and Eddie to recover some of the cocaine he stashed in a gazebo.

Sari searches for the children with Liz, a park ranger, and Peter, a wildlife activist. In the forest, they find Henry hiding in a tree. The bear attacks, injuring Liz and killing Peter. Sari and Henry flee deeper into the forest, while Liz runs back to the station to call for help. She accidentally kills Ponytail, and the bear kills Vest. Paramedics Beth and Tom arrive and rescue Liz after a brief skirmish with the bear. They flee with Liz in an ambulance, but the bear pursues and jumps into the vehicle. The bear kills Tom, while Liz falls out of the ambulance and is dragged to death on the road, and Beth dies when the ambulance crashes into a tree.

Sari and Henry discover that Dee Dee left a trail of paint and follow it. Stache leads Daveed and Eddie to the gazebo, but they encounter Bob there with the stashed duffel of cocaine, and Bob wounds Daveed. The bear appears, but Bob distracts it with a bag of cocaine. Syd arrives, along with Bob's corrupt police partner Reba, and fatally shoots Bob, while Stache escapes.

Sari and Henry find Olaf, who is mourning Elsa. He leads them to Dee Dee's hiding place in the bear's cave, along with its two cubs. Olaf leaves and is killed by the bear. Syd, Eddie, Daveed, and Reba find the cave, which leads out to a ledge behind the falls, but Reba chooses to leave. When the bear returns to the cave, Sari, Henry, and Dee Dee jump into the water below, followed by Eddie and Daveed, and they all survive. However, Syd refuses to leave the bag of cocaine found in the cave. He wounds the bear, but fails to kill it and is disemboweled by the bear and her cubs.

Later, Stache hitchhikes to New York with a duffel bag of cocaine, while Eddie, accompanied by Daveed and Bob's dog, reunites with his son.

== Cast ==
- Keri Russell as Sari
- Alden Ehrenreich as Eddie
- O'Shea Jackson Jr. as Daveed
- Ray Liotta as Syd White
- Isiah Whitlock Jr. as Bob
- Brooklynn Prince as Dee Dee
- Christian Convery as Henry
- Margo Martindale as Ranger Liz
- Jesse Tyler Ferguson as Peter
- Kristofer Hivju as Olaf Kristoffer
- Hannah Hoekstra as Elsa
- Ayoola Smart as Officer Reba
- Aaron Holliday as Stache / Kid
- J.B. Moore as "Vest"
- Leo Hanna as "Ponytail"
- Kahyun Kim as Beth
- Scott Seiss as Tom
- Matthew Rhys as Andrew Thornton

Allan Henry, a stunt performer and actor, played the role of the bear and is credited as "Bear Performer". He used custom-made, meter-long aluminum limb extensions to portray the bear's movements. While playing the bear, Henry did not have tracking markers on his face for animators to turn into digital muscle movements but provided a crucial reference point for the animators to create the bear's physicality and emotional state.

== Inspiration ==
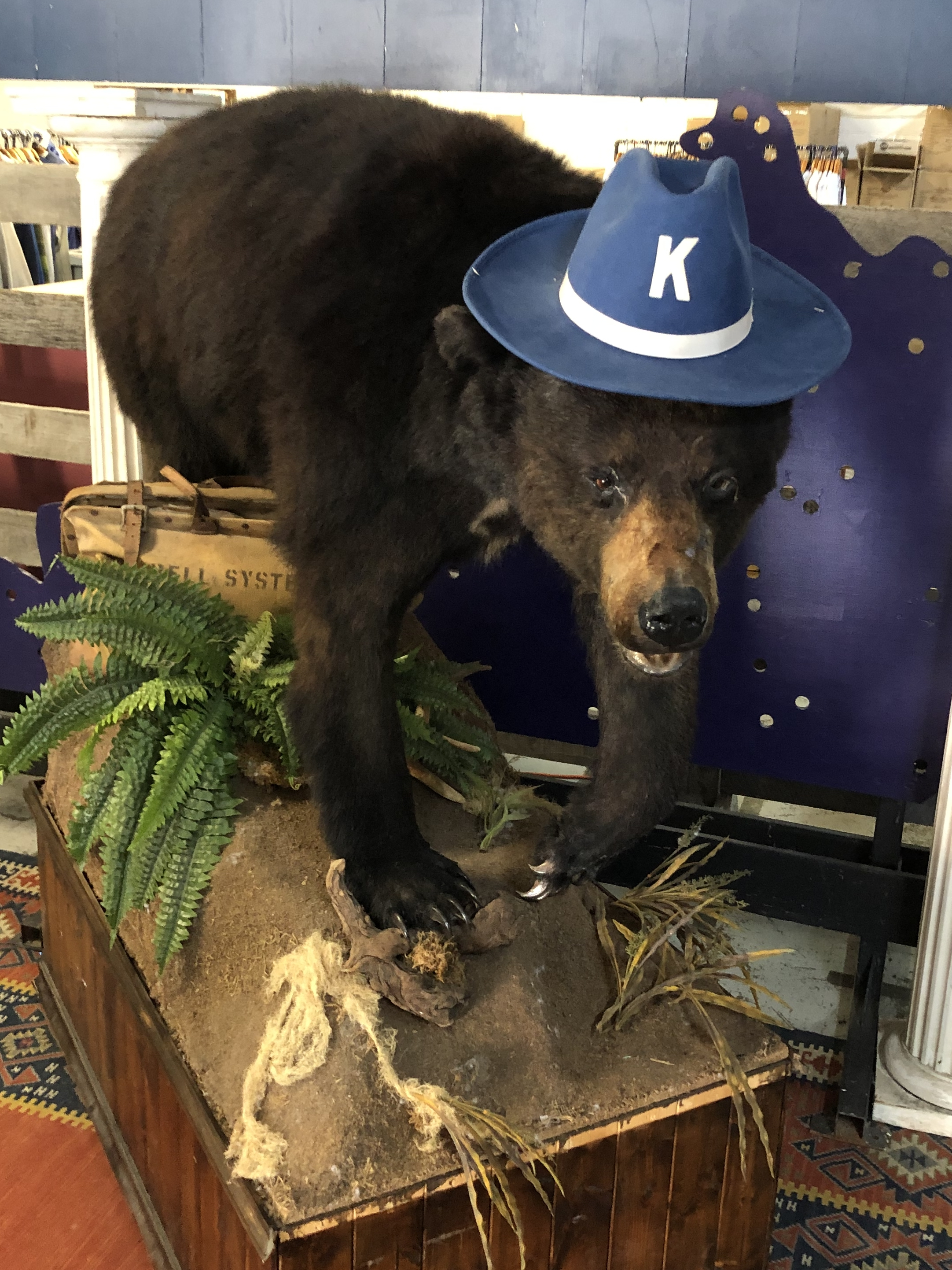
Taxidermy of the eponymous "cocaine bear" on display in Lexington, Kentucky

The film is loosely inspired by the events surrounding a 175-pound (79 kg) American black bear that died after ingesting a duffel bag full of cocaine in December 1985. The cocaine had been dropped out of an airplane piloted by Andrew C. Thornton II, a former narcotics officer and convicted drug smuggler, because his plane was carrying too heavy a load. Thornton then jumped out of the plane with a faulty parachute and died. The bear, who died sometime after consuming the cocaine, was found three months later in northern Georgia alongside 40 opened plastic containers of cocaine. The bear is currently on display at the Kentucky for Kentucky Fun Mall in Lexington, Kentucky, which named the creature "Cocaine Bear" in 2015.

=== Creative liberties ===
The film's plot differs from real-life events in a number of ways. Notably, the real-life Cocaine Bear is not known to have killed anyone after consuming drugs, and what transpired in the time leading up to its death from overdose is unknown. In an interview with Variety's Adam B. Vary, Banks stated that "this movie could be seen as that bear's revenge story."

=== Response to the film ===
Prior to the film's release, the story behind Cocaine Bear went viral on social media. Yasmin Tayag of The Atlantic wrote that part of the film's popularity on social media may have been due to the appeal of man versus nature narratives or the shock value of the premise. However, she noted that the bear was also presented in a sympathetic light by the film.

== Production ==
=== Development and casting ===
In December 2019, Phil Lord and Christopher Miller were announced to be producing an untitled horror comedy project inspired by the true story, and based on a spec script written by Jimmy Warden. The producers approached Radio Silence collectives Matt Bettinelli-Olpin and Tyler Gillett to direct, but both opted out of the film in favor of making the fifth Scream installment.

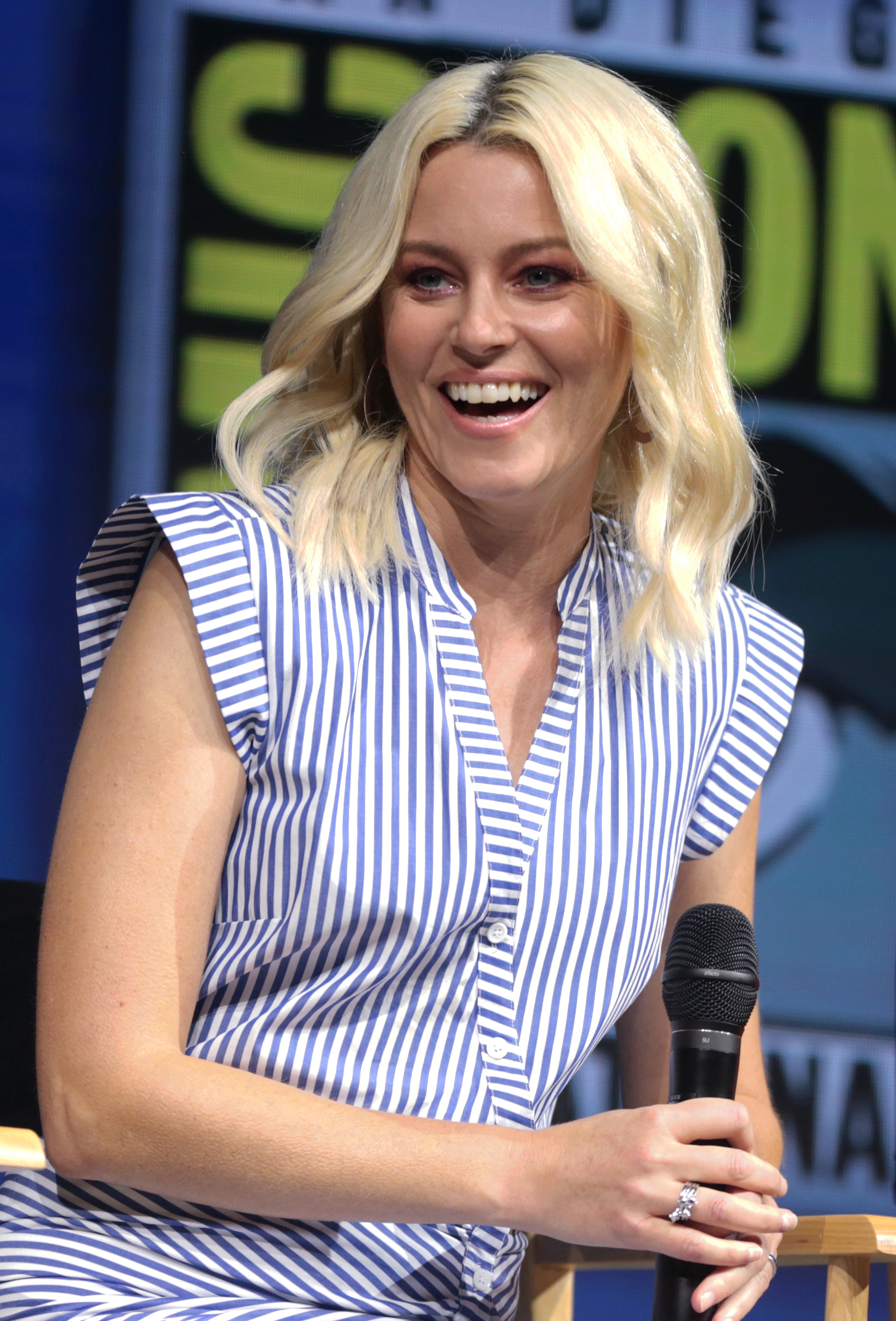
Elizabeth Banks was announced as director in 2021

On March 9, 2021, Universal Pictures announced that the film was in development. It was also confirmed that the film would instead be directed by Elizabeth Banks, and produced by Banks and Max Handelman for Brownstone Productions, who joined the producing team alongside Lord, Miller, Aditya Sood for Lord Miller Productions, and Brian Duffield. The ensemble cast was revealed between July and August 2021.

=== Filming ===
Principal photography took place in County Wicklow, Ireland, between August 20 and October 17, 2021. The production budget was $30–35 million, with a large portion of it going to Wētā FX to create the bear with CGI.

== Music ==
In February 2022, Natalie Holt was reported to compose the film score. However, Mark Mothersbaugh replaced her as composer in November 2022. It marks his second collaboration with Banks after Pitch Perfect 2 (2015).

The film's trailer made use of the song "White Lines (Don't Don't Do It)" by Melle Mel.

== Release ==
=== Theatrical ===
Cocaine Bear was theatrically released on February 24, 2023, by Universal Pictures. The film is dedicated to Ray Liotta, who died on May 26, 2022.

=== Home media ===
The film was released on premium video on demand services two weeks after the theatrical release, on March 14, 2023. It was followed by a Blu-ray and DVD release on April 18, 2023.

== Reception ==
=== Box office ===
Cocaine Bear grossed $64.7 million in the United States and Canada, and $25.3 million in other territories, for a worldwide total of $90 million.

In the United States and Canada, Cocaine Bear was released alongside Jesus Revolution and was initially projected to gross $15–20 million from 3,534 theaters in its opening weekend. The film made $8.7 million on its first day, including $2 million from Thursday night previews. It went on to debut to $23.1 million, finishing second behind holdover Ant-Man and the Wasp: Quantumania. The film finished in third place in its sophomore weekend with $11 million (dropping 54%), which was noted as a "very good hold" for a genre film. In its third weekend, the film finished in fifth place with $6.2 million.

=== Critical response ===
On the review aggregator website Rotten Tomatoes, 66% of 328 critics' reviews are positive, with an average rating of 6.1/10. The website's consensus reads: "Despite Cocaine Bear's half-baked plot and uneven acting, the titular fur fiend's scene-snorting frenzy will give B-movie enthusiasts a contact high." Metacritic, which uses a weighted average, assigned the film a score of 54 out of 100, based on 58 critics, indicating "mixed or average" reviews. Audiences polled by CinemaScore gave the film an average grade of "B–" on an A+ to F scale, while those polled by PostTrak gave it an 80% positive score, with 67% saying they would definitely recommend it.

Richard Roeper of the Chicago Sun-Times gave the film 3/4 stars, describing it as a "wildly entertaining and darkly hilarious B-movie blood-fest" and "genuinely well-crafted horror." In a same star review, ReelViews reviewer James Berardinelli called it "95 minutes of escapist fare." Although he criticized the number of characters, subplots and pacing, he concluded that the film was "silly but not stupid." Likewise, Christy Lemire of RogerEbert.com criticized the characters but her review was also overall positive. She noted that the film was "not that profound." "But it is an incredible blast, especially if you have the benefit of seeing director Elizabeth Banks' insanely violent comedy/thriller with a packed crowd." The Observer film critic Mark Kermode rated the film 3/5, saying "It may not be Grizzly Man meets Scarface, but it leaves Snakes on a Plane standing on the runway." In his review for The New York Times, Jason Zinoman describes Cocaine Bear as a blood-splattered major studio horror-comedy whose greatest joke is that it exists. He notes that the film consistently invites viewers to laugh at it and that it successfully captures the "comic potential of the gross-out". However, he suggests that the film's plot twists seem irrelevant and that its script becomes sentimentally dutiful at the end. Zinoman praises the bear's performance and a few raucous, transgressive moments, but he argues that the film's one-joke premise is stretched thin.

Writing for CBC.ca, Eli Glasner found the film disappointing, writing: "Does the bear roar? Does it live up to the hype? Does it fulfil the potent promise of that amazing title? Technically yes, but there's a wide chasm between what the audience wants Cocaine Bear to be, and what it delivers." In a negative review, Nicholas Barber of the BBC criticized the human characters and their interactions. He wrote, "Instead of showing us the moment when the title character discovered and ingested the drugs, the film keeps introducing more and more characters who could have been in the first draft of a Coen brothers script".

=== Accolades ===
At the 2023 MTV Movie & TV Awards, Cocaine Bear was nominated for Best Villain (the bear). The film won four categories at the 2023 Golden Trailer Awards: "Higher" (Inside Job) for Best Comedy, "Digital Campaign" (Project X/AV) for Best Viral Campaign for a Feature Film, "Payoff" (AV Print) for Best Thriller Poster, and "Ursa Coca" (Inside Job) for Best Radio/Audio Spot (For a Feature Film or TV/Streaming Series). It was also nominated for the Outstanding Achievement for Character Animation in a Live Action Production at the 51st Annie Awards.

== Legacy ==
Also released in 2023 was the documentary film "Cocaine Bear: The True Story" with Cocaine Bear's director Elizabeth Banks as one of its six executive producers.

Cocaine Bear inspired numerous mockbusters, including Meth Gator and Crackcoon. A Japanese film titled Kanizame Shakurabu was released before Cocaine Bear, but was later retitled Cocaine Shark to capitalize on the success of Cocaine Bear.

== See also ==
- Cocaine Crabs from Outer Space
- Cocaine Shark
- Meth Gator
