= Meth Gator =

2024 film by Christopher Douglas-Olen Ray

- The official film poster
- Directed by: Christopher Douglas-Olen Ray
- Screenplay by: Joe Roche; Lauren Pritchard
- Produced by: David Michael Latt
- Starring: LaRonn Marzett; Ray Acevedo; Vanesa Tamayo; Bruce Peoples; Patrick Labyorteaux
- Cinematography: Thomas Hennessy
- Edited by: Zach Lorkiewicz
- Music by: Chris Ridenhour; Christopher Cano; Mikel Shane Prather
- Production company: The Asylum
- Release dates: March 25, 2024 (DVD); August 2, 2024 (theatrical)
- Running time: 90 minutes
- Country: United States
- Language: English

Meth Gator (also known as Attack of the Meth Gator) is a 2024 American action film directed by Christopher Douglas-Olen Ray and produced by The Asylum. It is a mockbuster of the film Cocaine Bear by Elizabeth Banks.

== Premise ==
On an island in the Everglades, a DEA agent and a town sheriff team up with locals to hunt down a giant alligator on meth.

== Cast ==
- LaRonn Marzett as Dante Williams
- Ray Acevedo as Bithlo
- Vanesa Tamayo as Anna
- Patrick Labyorteaux as Mayor Jensen
- Robbie Rist as Trig
- Wade Hunt Williams as Grady
- Bruce Peoples as Sheriff Williams
- Stuart Maxheimer as Deputy Farme
- Benjamin L. Newmark as Shane
- Arlene Lagos as Skyler
- Tristen Michael Amason as Twain
- Gus Langley as Tucker
- Christopher Applegate as Buck
- Dare Taylor
- Javier Sylvester as Dante's Stunt Double

== Production ==
In February 2023, the day of the release of Cocaine Bear, The Asylum announced the film on Twitter under the working title of Attack of the Meth Gator. The next day, in a Tweet by The Asylum featuring a video of cast members complaining about the fictional titular alligator, it was confirmed that filming had completed on February 25. At the 2023 San Diego Comic-Con, it was announced that the film had been renamed from Attack of the Meth Gator to simply Meth Gator.

=== Inspiration ===
Meth Gator is inspired by reports from 2019 that a Tennessee police department publicly discouraged the flushing of methamphetamine down toilets due to the possibility that alligators could ingest the drug, creating hyper-aggressive "meth gators". At the time of the reports, Kent Vliet, an alligator biologist at the University of Florida, denied the existence of so-called meth gators, stating that it was a "ridiculous notion". Writer Brett Taylor claimed his 2019 script "Meth Gators" was the inspiration for the movie, which he called "lame and unfunny." (13)

== Release ==
Meth Gator was released on DVD by High Fliers Films on March 25, 2024, and released digitally and in theaters on August 2.

== See also ==
- List of drug films
