= Dreamsongs: A RRetrospective =

Book by George R.R. Martin

- UK edition hardback
- Author: George R.R. Martin
- Language: English
- Genre: Fantasy novel, Short stories, novellas
- Publisher: Subterranean Press (US); Victor Gollancz Ltd (UK)
- Publication date: August/September 2003 (US); 21 September 2006 (UK)
- Publication place: United States
- Media type: Print (hardback)
- Pages: 1286 pp
- ISBN: 0-575-07905-3 (UK first edition, hardback)
- OCLC: 67374681

Dreamsongs: A RRetrospective is a career-spanning collection of George R. R. Martin's short fiction. It was first published in 2003 as a single volume hardcover from Subterranean Press under the title GRRM: A RRetrospective and debuted in Toronto at Torcon 3, the 63rd World Science Fiction Convention, where Martin was the Writer Guest Of Honor. The collection features 34 pieces of fiction (including two TV scripts), an introduction by Gardner Dozois, commentary by Martin on each stage of his career, a Martin bibliography, and original art for each story. Subterranean published the book in three formats: a trade hardcover, a signed, numbered, and slipcased deluxe hardcover, and a very limited, deluxe leather-bound, lettered hardcover. The Washington Post called Subterranean's single-author collection "the most ambitious volume ever to come from an American specialty press".

A UK first hardcover edition (right), running to more than 1,200 pages, was published three years later, in September 2006, by Victor Gollancz Ltd. Bantam then reprinted the collection in the United States in 2007 as a two-volume trade hardcover set. Both the 2006 UK reprint and 2007 USA reprint carry the new title Dreamsongs: A RRetrospective.

== Contents ==
The collection is divided into nine thematic sections, with all the stories arranged in rough chronological order. The sections, and the stories they contain, are as follows:

=== A Four-Color Fanboy ===
#	Title	Year	Note	Previously published
1	"Only Kids Are Afraid of the Dark"	1967		Previously uncollected
2	"The Fortress"	2003	Written in the 1960s	Previously uncollected
3	"And Death His Legacy"	2003	Written in the 1960s	Previously uncollected

=== The Filthy Pro ===
#	Title	Year	Previously published
4	"The Hero"	1971	A Song for Lya (1976)
5	"The Exit to San Breta"	1972	A Song for Lya (1976)
6	"The Second Kind of Loneliness"	1972	A Song for Lya (1976) / Portraits of His Children (1987)
7	"With Morning Comes Mistfall"	1973	A Song for Lya (1976) / Portraits of His Children (1987)

=== The Light of Distant Stars ===
#	Title	Year	Note	Previously published
8	"A Song for Lya"	1974	Novella	A Song for Lya (1976) / Nightflyers (1985)
9	"This Tower of Ashes"	1976		Analog Annual (1976) / Songs of Stars and Shadows (1977) / Songs the Dead Men Sing (1983)
10	"And Seven Times Never Kill Man"	1975	Novelette	Songs of Stars and Shadows (1977) / Nightflyers (1985)
11	"The Stone City"	1977	Novelette	Sandkings (1981)
12	"Bitterblooms"	1977	Novelette	Sandkings (1981)
13	"The Way of Cross and Dragon"	1979	Novelette	Sandkings (1981)

=== The Heirs of Turtle Castle ===
#	Title	Year	Note	Previously published
14	"The Lonely Songs of Laren Dorr"	1976		Songs of Stars and Shadows (1977) / Portraits of His Children (1987)
15	"The Ice Dragon"	1980	Novelette	Portraits of His Children (1987)
16	"In the Lost Lands"	1982		Portraits of His Children (1987)

=== Hybrids and Horrors ===
#	Title	Year	Note	Previously published
17	"Meathouse Man"	1976	Novelette	Songs the Dead Men Sing (1983)
18	"Remembering Melody"	1981		Songs the Dead Men Sing (1983)
19	"Sandkings"	1979	Novelette	Sandkings (1981) / Songs the Dead Men Sing (1983)
20	"Nightflyers"	1980	Novella	Songs the Dead Men Sing (1983) / Nightflyers (1985)
21	"The Monkey Treatment"	1983	Novelette	Songs the Dead Men Sing (1983)
22	"The Pear-Shaped Man"	1987	Novelette	Previously uncollected

=== A Taste of Tuf ===
This section features two stories in the Haviland Tuf series, about an overweight space trader encountering various civilizations.

#	Title	Year	Note	Previously published
23	"A Beast for Norn"	1976	Novelette	Tuf Voyaging (1986)
24	"Guardians"	1981	Novelette	Tuf Voyaging (1986)

=== The Siren Song of Hollywood ===
This section features two television screenplays by George R. R. Martin. The former is a script for an episode of The Twilight Zone, and the latter is a pilot for a never-made science fiction series similar to Sliders.

#	Title	Year	Note	Previously published
25	"The Road Less Traveled"	1986	Screenplay	Previously uncollected
26	"Doorways"	1993	Screenplay	Previously uncollected

=== Doing the Wild Card Shuffle ===
This section features two of George R. R. Martin's contributions to the Wild Cards shared universe.

#	Title	Year	Note	Previously published
27	"Shell Games"	1987	Novelette	Previously uncollected
28	"From the Journal of Xavier Desmond"	1988	Novella	Previously uncollected

=== The Heart in Conflict ===
#	Title	Year	Note	Previously published
29	"Under Siege"	1985	Novelette	Portraits of His Children (1987)
30	"The Skin Trade"	1988	Novella	Quartet (2001)
31	"Unsound Variations"	1982	Novella	Portraits of His Children (1987)
32	"The Glass Flower"	1986	Novelette	Portraits of His Children (1987)
33	"The Hedge Knight"	1998	Novella. Series A Knight of the Seven Kingdoms #1	Legends
34	"Portraits of His Children"	1985	Novelette	Portraits of His Children (1987)
