= Sandkings (short story collection) =

Short story collection

- First edition, cover art by Rowena Morrill
- Author: George R. R. Martin
- Cover artist: Rowena Morrill
- Language: English
- Genre: Science fiction
- Publisher: Timescape Books
- Publication date: 1981
- Publication place: United States
- Pages: 238 (first edition)
- ISBN: 9780671426637

Sandkings is the third collection of science fiction short stories by American writer George R. R. Martin, published by Timescape Books in December 1981. It contains seven short stories. The collection won the Locus Award for best single author collection. The multiple-award-winning title story concerns a race of insectoid, militaristic alien "pets" who worship their master until he badly mistreats them.

== Contents ==
- "The Way of Cross and Dragon" (Omni, June 1979; novelette)
- "Bitterblooms" (Cosmos Science Fiction and Fantasy, November 1977; novelette)
- "In the House of the Worm" (The Ides of Tomorrow, 1976)
- "Fast-Friend" (Faster than Light, 1976)
- "The Stone City" (New Voices I, 1977; novelette)
- "Starlady" (Science Fiction Discoveries, 1976)
- "Sandkings" (Omni, August 1979; novelette)

== "Sandkings" ==
In the original story (set in the same fictional "Thousand Worlds" universe as several of Martin's other works, including Dying of the Light, Nightflyers, A Song for Lya, "With Morning Comes Mistfall", "The Way of Cross and Dragon" and the stories collected in Tuf Voyaging), a millionaire named Simon Kress buys four colonies of sandkings—highly intelligent antlike creatures—as an addition to his collection of exotic pets. Problems occur when he forces the sandkings to make war on one another for his amusement, only to find they are a more sophisticated species than he had realised.

The story was adapted into "The Sandkings", an episode of the new The Outer Limits, as well as a 1987 graphic novel, published by DC Comics as the seventh and last book of the DC Science Fiction Graphic Novel line, adapted by Doug Moench, Pat Broderick and Neal McPheeters.
