= Songs the Dead Men Sing =

First edition

Songs the Dead Men Sing is the fourth short story collection of author George R.R. Martin. It was first published in October 1983 by Dark Harvest. It contains nine short stories.

== Contents ==
| # | Title | Year | Note |
|---|---|---|---|
| 1 | "The Monkey Treatment" | 1983 | Novelette |
| 2 | "...For a Single Yesterday" | 1975 | Previously published in Songs of Stars and Shadows (1977) |
| 3 | "In the House of the Worm" | 1976 | Previously published in Sandkings (1981) |
| 4 | "The Needle Men" | 1981 | |
| 5 | "Meathouse Man" | 1976 | Novelette |
| 6 | "Sandkings" | 1979 | Novelette previously published in Sandkings (1981) |
| 7 | "This Tower of Ashes" | 1976 | Previously published in Songs of Stars and Shadows (1977) |
| 8 | "Nightflyers" | 1980 | Novella |
| 9 | "Remembering Melody" | 1981 | |
