= Sandkings =

Sandkings may refer to:

- Sandkings (short story collection), a short story collection by George R. R. Martin
- Sandkings (novelette), a novelette by George R. R. Martin
- "The Sandkings", an episode of The Outer Limits based on the novelette of the same name
- The Sandkings (band), an independent British rock band
