= Santa Fe International Film Festival =

Film festival in Santa Fe, New Mexico, United States

- Location: Santa Fe, New Mexico, United States
- Founded: 2009
- Website: https://santafe.film/

The Santa Fe International Film Festival (SFiFF), formerly known as the Santa Fe Independent Film Festival, is an American film festival held annually in Santa Fe, New Mexico at the Lensic Performing Arts Center, Sky Cinemas, Center for Contemporary Arts, and George R.R. Martin's Jean Cocteau Cinema.

== History ==
The SFiFF was founded in 2009.

Honorees at SFiFF 2012 included Chris Eyre, Rudolfo Anaya, and Judy Blume.

In 2013, SFiFF was included in MovieMaker magazine's list of "25 Coolest General Film Festivals on the Planet". 2013 Santa Fe Independent Film Festival awarded John Waters & actor Wes Studi. John Waters performed his live one-man show This Filthy World at the Lensic Performing Arts Center.

For SFiFF 2014 there were over 10,000 attendees for the first time, and presented Lifetime Achievement Awards to Shirley MacLaine and George R. R. Martin.

In 2015, Santa Fe Independent Film Festival honored Ted Hope, Imogene Hughes, and Hampton Sides.

SFiFF 2015 honored Gena Rowlands with a lifetime achievement award.

SFiFF 2016 presented Jacqueline Bisset with the Lifetime Achievement Award, and Jay Roach with the American filmmaker award.

SFiFF 2017 presented John Sayles and Maggie Renzi with the Lifetime Achievement Award. N. Scott Momaday was presented the Lifetime Achievement Award by Robert Redford and John Waters. Chris Eyre, George R.R. Martin, and Wes Studi returned as guests. SFiFF presented a Q&A with Ethan Hawke at Center for Contemporary Arts.

SFiFF 2018 presented Bill Plympton with a Lifetime Achievement Award, and Alexandria Bombach received the festival's Visionary Award for Santa Fe Independent Film Festival's 10th Annual Festival.

In 2019, SFiFF was included in Moviemaker magazine's list of "50 Festivals Worth the Entry Fee". SFiFF also presented Lifetime Achievement Awards to Tantoo Cardinal and Jane Seymour.

In 2021, SFiFF presented the Lifetime Achievement Award to Director Oliver Stone.

In 2022, SFiFF presented the Lifetime Achievement Award to Godfrey Reggio and presented the world premiere of his newest film Once Within A Time. The festival also presented Director Catherine Hardwicke with the Visionary Award.

In July 2022, the festival was rebranded as the Santa Fe International Film Festival. Steina Vasulka was presented the icon award for her works and achievements in video art.

In 2023, SFiFF honored film director Sterlin Harjo with the Visionary Award.

In 2024, the festival recognized actor Bryan Cranston with the Lifetime Achievement Award before a screening of Trumbo.

The 2024 edition opened with Malcolm Washington’s The Piano Lesson and closed with Amber Sealey’s Out of My Mind. Over five days, the festival showed a selection of 184 films, including 42 narrative features, 24 documentaries, and 118 short films.

In 2025, SFiFF bestowed Edward James Olmos with the Lifetime Achievement Award. Stand and Deliver, which featured an iconic performance from Mr. Olmos, was screened afterwards. The festival also awarded Amy Goodman the icon award after a screening of the film Steal This Story, Please!.

== Notable films ==
- Salt of the Earth, (2010)
- Hostiles
- Only The Brave
- Fire at Sea
- Shoplifters
- Burning
- The Square
- On Her Shoulders
- Bless Me, Ultima
- The Broken Circle Breakdown
- The Homesman
- Taped
- Girlhood
- The Front Runner
- Women Talking
- Flow
- Nickel Boys
- A Real Pain
- Anatomy of a Fall
- Flow
- Frankenstein (2025)
- Sentimental Value
- No Other Choice
- Nuremberg (2025)
