= A Song for Lya =

Book by George R.R. Martin

- First edition cover
- Author: George R. R. Martin
- Cover artist: Patrick Woodroffe
- Language: English
- Genre: Science fiction and fantasy short stories
- Publisher: Avon Books
- Publication date: 1976
- Publication place: United States
- Media type: Print (hardback & paperback)
- ISBN: 0-380-00521-2
- OCLC: 2411749

A Song for Lya is the first collection of stories by science fiction and fantasy writer George R. R. Martin, published as a paperback original by Avon Books in 1976. It was reprinted by different publishers in 1978 and in 2001. The title is sometimes rendered A Song for Lya and Other Stories. A Song for Lya won the 1977 Locus Poll as the year's best story collection.

== Contents ==
1. "With Morning Comes Mistfall" (Analog, 1973)
2. "The Second Kind of Loneliness" (Analog, 1972)
3. "Override" (Analog, 1973), novelette
4. "Dark, Dark Were the Tunnels" (Vertex, 1973)
5. "The Hero" (Galaxy, 1971)
6. "FTA" (Analog, 1974)
7. "Run to Starlight" (Amazing, 1974)
8. "The Exit to San Breta" (Fantastic, 1972)
9. "Slide Show" (Omega, 1973)
10. "A Song for Lya" (Analog, 1974), novella

== Reception ==
Spider Robinson reviewed the collection favorably, declaring that while a few stories were "duds," that "the good stuff in Song for Lya is so dazzingly good that it would cover a much greater multitude of sins".
