= Ice Dragon =

Ice Dragon or Ice Dragons may refer to:

- Ice Dragon, a dinosaur-like monster that appears in Kirby's Dream Land 2
- The Ice Dragon, a children's fantasy novella by George R. R. Martin
- "The Ice Dragon" (Game of Thrones), the sixth episode in Game of Thrones (2014 video game)
- Ice Dragons (Ledeni Zmajevi), the nickname of the Bosnia and Herzegovina men's national ice hockey team
