= The Armageddon Rag =

1983 novel by George R. R. Martin

- First edition cover
- Author: George R. R. Martin
- Cover artist: Milton Charles; Victor Moscoso (limited ed.)
- Language: English
- Genre: Horror, Mystery, fantasy
- Published: 1983
- Publisher: Poseidon Press
- Publication date: November 1983
- Publication place: United States
- Media type: Novel
- ISBN: 0-671-47526-6; 0-914261-00-2 (limited ed.)

The Armageddon Rag is a 1983 mystery/fantasy novel by American author George R. R. Martin, first co-published in hardcover by both Poseidon Press and The Nemo Press. The novel contains subdued and hidden fantasy elements and is structured in the form of a murder mystery; it is also a meditation on the rock music era of the 1960s (and its associated culture) and what became of both by the mid-1980s. The novel contains a detailed account of the history and repertoire of its imaginary rock band, including concert setlists and album track timings. Each of the novel's chapter headings open with actual famous rock lyrics, whose meanings resonate throughout that chapter.

Martin has described the book as probably his most ambitious and experimental novel but "a total commercial disaster" that almost destroyed his career. Nevertheless, The Armageddon Rag was nominated for the 1983 World Fantasy Award for Best Novel, and won the Balrog Award for best novel.

Despite its initial commercial failure, the novel remains in print.

== Plot ==
Frustrated former hippie novelist Sandy Blair becomes involved in the investigation of the brutal murder of rock promoter Jamie Lynch, whose heart had been torn from his body. Lynch, a despised impresario, had been found dead in a small town in Maine, the victim of a ritualistic murder. Lynch had managed several bands, including the legendary rock group the Nazgûl (named after the evil Ringwraiths in Tolkien's The Lord of the Rings). He was found dead on the 10th anniversary of the Nazgûl's breakup, with his bloody body placed on top of the band's West Mesa, New Mexico, concert poster; during that concert, Nazgûl lead singer Patrick Henry "Hobbit" Hobbins had been mysteriously murdered.

Lynch's high-profile death soon opens the door for a Nazgûl reunion tour, which slowly begins to eerily mirror the events of their original West Mesa tour. With Lynch out of the way, a disastrous act of arson forces the remaining three members of the Nazgûl to go on a reunion tour, promoted by a rich man named Edan Morse. The mysterious Morse may or may not have been a left-wing revolutionary in the 1970s, noted for his violent methods. Morse produces a young man who is a doppelgänger for Hobbins, whom Morse plans to make the lead singer of the reunited Nazgûl, despite the fact that the doppelgänger's musical talents are subpar and he lacks any charisma. Interviewing the surviving members of the band while tracking down his old friends from the 1960s, Blair meditates on the meaning of the flower power generation as he crisscrosses the country. He eventually becomes the Nazgûl's press agent and is soon swept up in the frenzy of their successful reunion tour and an oncoming supernatural convergence, whose nature he must uncover in order to solve the murders of Lynch and Hobbins. Blair comes to suspect that Morse wants to bring the Nazgûl together to perform an occult ritual that will unleash a dark supernatural power upon the world, an act of revenge against a world that has spurned the idealism of the late 1960s counterculture.

== Reception ==
The novel was a commercial failure and led Martin to withdraw from writing prose fiction for several years to focus on writing scripts for network television. Algis Budrys described the novel as "a powerful and fundamental fantasy in which the central haunt is not the shade of a departed person, but of a time." He concluded that "directed at a highly controversial area though it may be, it is about something so many of us care so deeply about".

== Editions ==
The novel was published by Poseidon Press, an imprint of Simon & Schuster. A limited edition was published by Nemo Press which included a slipcase and art by Victor Moscoso. A mass market paperback edition was released by Pocket Books in 1985.
