= Jean Cocteau Cinema =

Theater in Santa Fe, New Mexico

Coordinates: 35°41′6″N 105°56′47″W

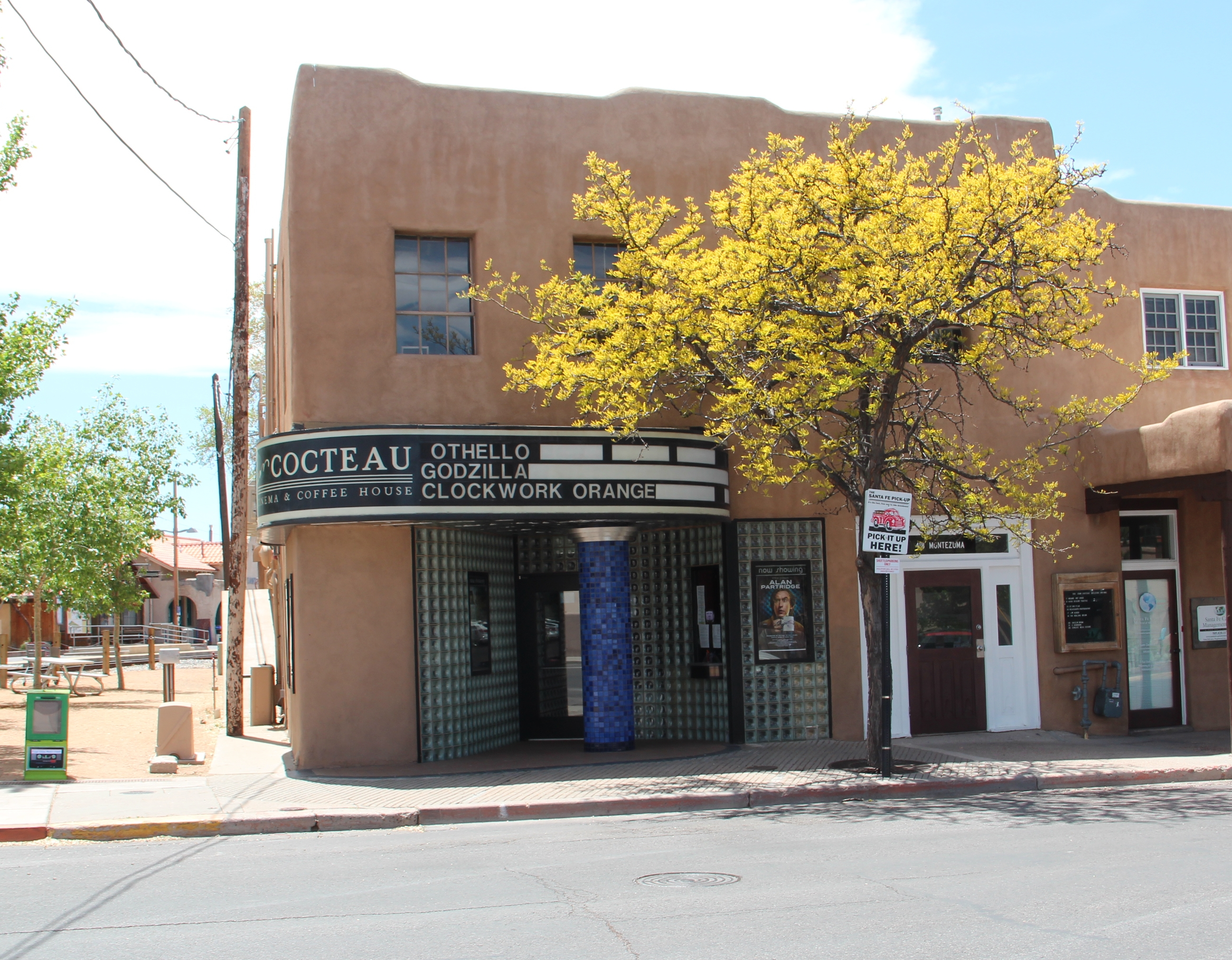
- Jean Cocteau Cinema in 2014
- Interactive map of Jean Cocteau Cinema
- Former names: Collective Fantasy Cinema
- Address: 418 Montezuma Avenue
- Location: Santa Fe, New Mexico, United States
- Owner: Brent Kliewer (1983–1986); Blue Pearl Corporation (1986–1989); Trans-Lux (1989–2010); George R. R. Martin (2013–present)
- Operator: Jon Bowman; Jenni Higginbotham; Nicole Lawe; David Sidebottom
- Seating type: 128 Standard; 4 VIP
- Capacity: 132
- Type: Movie theater

Construction
- Built: 1910
- Opened: 1975
- Renovated: 2013
- Closed: April 2006
- Reopened: 9 August 2013

Tenant
- Wild Hare Salon of Santa Fe (Kristin Mader)

Website
- jeancocteaucinema.com

The Jean Cocteau Cinema is a historic movie theater (formerly the Collective Fantasy Cinema) located in Santa Fe, New Mexico, United States. It is currently owned by American author George R. R. Martin. In addition to films, the cinema hosts author talks and book-signings, along with a small display of signed books for sale; burlesque, magic and variety shows; art exhibitions, and concerts.

== History ==
In 1976, four partners (Lynne Cohen, Mary Hether, Anne Lewis and Richard Szanyi) opened the first movie theater on the site, the Collective Fantasy Cinema.

In 1983, Brent Kliewer acquired the theater, renovated it, and rechristened it the Jean Cocteau Cinema, a tribute to the famed French poet, novelist and filmmaker. As the National Observer once noted, "of the artistic generation whose daring gave birth to Twentieth Century Art, Cocteau came closest to being a Renaissance man".

The theatre closed in 2006 before being purchased and renovated by novelist/producer George R.R. Martin in 2013.
