= The Ice Dragon =

Fantasy novelette by George R. R. Martin

- Author: George R. R. Martin
- Illustrator: Alicia Austin; Val Lakey Lindahn and Ron Lindahn (1987); Anne Yvonne Gilbert (2007); Luis Royo (2014)
- Language: English
- Genre: Fantasy
- Published: 1980 (Dragons of Light anthology); 1987 (Portraits of His Children collection); 2007; 2014
- Publisher: Ace Books, anthology edition; Starscape Books, 1st edition; Harper Voyager, 2nd edition
- Publication place: United States
- Media type: Novella

The Ice Dragon is a children's fantasy novelette by George R. R. Martin, originally published in 1980 in the Ace Books anthology Dragons of Light, as illustrated by Alicia Austin. It was later included in Martin's 1987 collection Portraits of His Children, as illustrated by Val Lakey Lindahn and Ron Lindahn. The story was reworked in 2007 with artwork by Anne Yvonne Gilbert, and again in 2014 with a series of original paintings by Luis Royo.

The Ice Dragon, in translated form as El dragón de hielo, won the 2004 Ignotus Award in Spain for best translated foreign short story; in 2005, it was nominated for a Seiun Award in Japan for translated short story.

== Plot ==
The novella follows the story of a young girl, Adara, who befriends an ice dragon after the death of her mother.

Martin has stated that The Ice Dragon is not set in the same world as Westeros of A Song of Ice and Fire, commenting: "The world of Ice & Fire did not exist when I wrote The Ice Dragon". Despite this, several press releases, book covers and commentaries have claimed that it is set in the same world.

== Film ==
In May 2018, Warner Animation Group acquired the rights to make a feature-length animated film based on the book, with Martin producing and his manager, Vince Geradis, as executive producer. In October 2022, during a livestreamed interview moderated by author David Anthony Durham, Martin said that the adaptation would be going forward with Durham writing the screenplay.
