= George R. R. Martin =

American writer and television producer (born 1948)

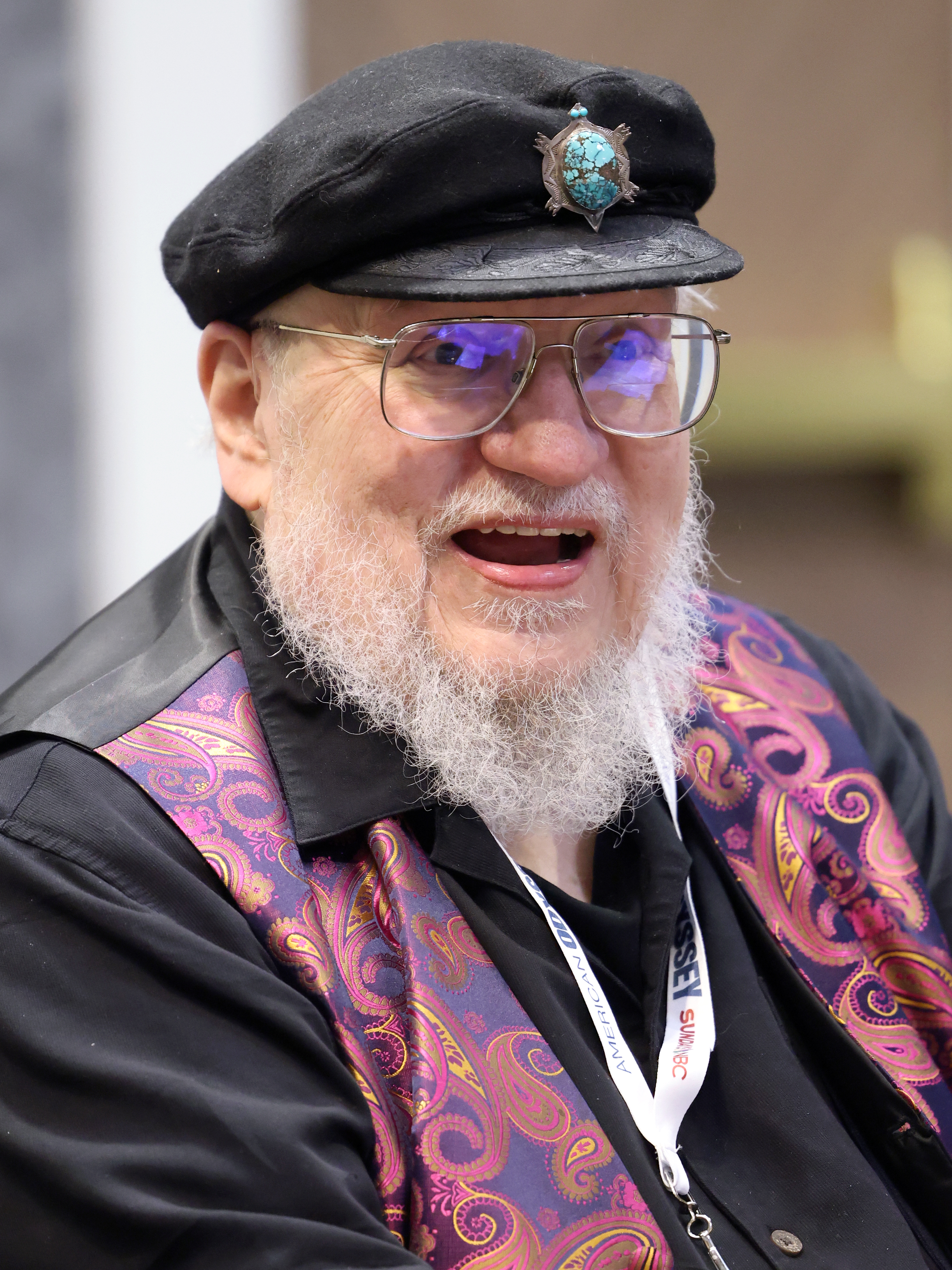
- Martin in 2025
- Born: George Raymond Martin; September 20, 1948 (age 78); Bayonne, New Jersey, U.S.
- Education: Northwestern University (BS, MS)
- Occupations: Author; screenwriter; TV producer
- Spouses: Gale Burnick (m. 1975; div. 1979); Parris McBride (m. 2011)
- Writing career
- Period: 1965–present
- Genres: Fantasy; horror; science fiction
- Notable works: A Song of Ice and Fire; Wild Cards anthology series; The Thousand World stories
- Website: georgerrmartin.com

George Raymond Richard Martin (born George Raymond Martin, September 20, 1948), also known by the initials GRRM, is an American author, screenwriter, and television producer. Martin is best known as the author of the epic fantasy novel series A Song of Ice and Fire, which was adapted by HBO into the Primetime Emmy Award–winning television series Game of Thrones (2011–2019) and its prequel series House of the Dragon (2022–present). Martin also wrote a related series of novellas, Tales of Dunk and Egg, which have been adapted by HBO as A Knight of the Seven Kingdoms (2026–present). Outside of A Song of Ice and Fire and its related media, Martin helped create the Wild Cards anthology series and contributed worldbuilding for the video game Elden Ring (2022).

In 2005, Lev Grossman of Time called Martin "the American Tolkien", and in 2011, he was included on the annual Time 100 list of the most influential people in the world. He is a longtime resident of Santa Fe, New Mexico, where he helped fund Meow Wolf and owns the Jean Cocteau Cinema.

== Early life ==
George Raymond Martin (he adopted the confirmation name Richard at 13 years old) was born on September 20, 1948, in Bayonne, New Jersey, the son of Raymond Collins, a longshoreman, and Margaret (née Brady) Martin. His mother's family had once been wealthy, owning a successful construction business, but lost their wealth in the Great Depression, something Martin was reminded about every day when he passed what had been his family's dock and house. He has two younger sisters, Darleen and Janet. A DNA test on the series Finding Your Roots showed him to be 53.6% "British and Irish", 22.4% Ashkenazi Jewish, and 15.6% "Broadly Northwestern European".

The family first lived in a house on Broadway belonging to Martin's great-grandmother. In 1953, they moved to a federal housing project near the Bayonne docks. During Martin's childhood, his world consisted predominantly of "First Street to Fifth Street", between his grade school and his home. This limited world made him want to travel and experience other places, but he found this impossible except in his imagination, and he became a voracious reader.

Martin began writing and selling monster stories for pennies to other neighborhood children, including dramatic readings. He had to stop once a customer's mother complained about her child's nightmares. He also wrote stories about a mythical kingdom populated by his pet turtles — the turtles died frequently in their toy castle, so he decided they were killing each other off in "sinister plots". Martin had a habit of starting "endless stories" that he never completed, as they did not turn out as well on paper as he had imagined them.

Martin attended Mary Jane Donohoe School and later Marist High School. While there, he became an avid comic-book fan, developing a strong interest in the superheroes being published by Marvel Comics, and later credited Stan Lee for being one of his greatest literary influences; "Maybe Stan Lee is the greatest literary influence on me, even more than Shakespeare or Tolkien." A letter Martin wrote to the editor of Fantastic Four was printed in issue #20 (November 1963); it was the first of many sent, e.g., Fantastic Four #32, #34, and others. Fans who read his letters wrote him letters in turn, and through such contacts, Martin joined the fledgling comics fandom of the era, writing fiction for various fanzines; he bought the first ticket to the world's first Comic-Con, held in New York in 1964. In 1965, Martin won comic fandom's Alley Award for Best Fan Fiction for his prose superhero story "Powerman vs. The Blue Barrier".

In 1970, Martin earned a BS in journalism with a minor in history from Northwestern University's Medill School of Journalism in Evanston, Illinois, graduating summa cum laude; he went on to complete his MS in journalism in 1971, also from Medill. Eligible for the draft during the Vietnam War, to which he objected, Martin applied for and obtained conscientious objector status; he instead did alternative service work for two years (1972–1974) as a VISTA volunteer, attached to the Cook County Legal Assistance Foundation.

== Career ==
=== Early writing career ===
Martin began selling science fiction short stories professionally in 1970, at age 21. His first sale was "The Hero", sold to Galaxy magazine and published in its February 1971 issue; other sales soon followed. His first story to be nominated for the Hugo Award and Nebula Awards was "With Morning Comes Mistfall", published in 1973 in Analog magazine. In 1975 his story "...for a single yesterday" about a post-apocalyptic timetripper was selected for inclusion in Epoch, a science fiction anthology edited by Roger Elwood and Robert Silverberg. His first novel, Dying of the Light, was completed in 1976 right before he moved to Dubuque and published in 1977. That same year the enormous success of Star Wars had a huge impact on the publishing industry and science fiction, and he sold the novel for the same amount he would make in three years of teaching.

The short stories he was able to sell in his early twenties gave him some profit but not enough to pay his bills, which prevented him from becoming the full-time writer he wanted to be. The need for a day job occurred simultaneously with the American chess craze which followed Bobby Fischer's victory in the 1972 world chess championship. Martin's own chess skills and experience allowed him to be hired as a tournament director for the Continental Chess Association, which ran chess tournaments on the weekends. This gave him a sufficient income, and because the tournaments only ran on Saturdays and Sundays, it allowed him to work as a writer five days a week from 1973 to 1976. By the time the chess craze subsided and no longer provided an income, he had become much better established as a writer.

=== Teaching ===
In the mid-1970s, Martin met English professor George Guthridge from Dubuque, Iowa, at a science fiction convention in Milwaukee. Martin persuaded Guthridge (who later said that at that time he despised science fiction and fantasy) not only to give speculative fiction a second look, but also to write in the field himself. Guthridge then went on to be a finalist for the Hugo Award and twice for the Nebula Award for science fiction and fantasy. In 1998, Guthridge and Janet Berliner won the Bram Stoker Award for Superior Achievement in the Novel for their Children of the Dusk.

In turn, Guthridge helped Martin in finding a job at Clarke University (then Clarke College). Martin "wasn't making enough money to stay alive" from writing and the chess tournaments, said Guthridge. From 1976 to 1978, Martin was an English and journalism instructor at Clarke, and he became Writer In Residence at the college from 1978 to 1979.

=== Concentration on writing ===
While he enjoyed teaching, the sudden death of friend and fellow author Tom Reamy in late 1977 made Martin reevaluate his own life, and he eventually decided to try to become a full-time writer. In 1979 he resigned from his job and moved from Dubuque to Santa Fe, New Mexico at the end of the year. There he would live alone for almost three years, a period he described as tremendously productive in regard to writing.

Martin is a member of the Science Fiction and Fantasy Writers of America (SFWA); he served as the organization's Southwest Regional Director from 1977 to 1979, and as its vice-president from 1996 to 1998. In 1976, for Kansas City's MidAmeriCon, the 34th World Science Fiction Convention (Worldcon), Martin and his friend and fellow writer-editor Gardner Dozois conceived of and organized the first Hugo Losers' Party for the benefit of all past and present Hugo-losing writers on the evening following the convention's Hugo Awards ceremony. Martin was nominated for two Hugos that year but lost both awards, for the novelette "...and Seven Times Never Kill Man" and the novella The Storms of Windhaven, co-written with Lisa Tuttle. Although Martin often writes fantasy or horror, a number of his earlier works are science fiction tales occurring in a loosely defined future history, known informally as "The Thousand Worlds" or "The Manrealm".

In 2017, Martin recalled that he had started writing science fiction-horror hybrids in the late 1970s to disprove a statement from a critic claiming that science fiction and horror were opposites and therefore incompatible. Martin considered Sandkings (1979) the best known of these. Another was the novella Nightflyers (1980), whose screen and television rights were purchased by in 1984 by Vista, which produced a 1987 film adaptation, Nightflyers, with a screenplay co-written by Martin. Martin was unhappy about having to cut plot elements in order to accommodate the film's small budget. While not a hit at theatres, Martin believes that the film saved his career, and that everything he has written since exists in large part because of it. He has also written at least one piece of political-military fiction, "Night of the Vampyres", collected in Harry Turtledove's anthology The Best Military Science Fiction of the 20th Century (2001).

In 1982, Martin published a vampire novel titled Fevre Dream set in the 19th century on the Mississippi River, in the heyday of the great paddle steamers. Unlike traditional vampire novels, in Fevre Dream vampires are not supernatural creatures, but are rather a different species related to humans created by evolution with superhuman powers. Critic Don D'Amassa has praised Fevre Dream for its strong 19th-century atmosphere and wrote: "This is without question one of the greatest vampire novels of all time". Martin followed up Fevre Dream with another horror novel, The Armageddon Rag (1983). The unexpected commercial failure of The Armageddon Rag "essentially destroyed my career as a novelist at the time", he recalled, and made him consider going into real estate instead.

In 1984, the new editor of Baen Books, Betsy Mitchell, called Martin to ask him if he had considered doing a collection of Haviland Tuf adventures. Martin, who had several favorite series characters like Solomon Kane, Elric, Nicholas van Rijn and Magnus Ridolph, had made an attempt to create such a character on his own in the 1970s with his Tuf stories. He was interested, but was too occupied with the writing of his next book, the never-completed novel Black and White and Red All Over, which occupied most of his writing time the same year. But after the failure of The Armageddon Rag, all editors rejected his upcoming novel, and desperate for money, he accepted Mitchell's offer and wrote some more Tuf stories which were collected in Tuf Voyaging, which sold well enough for Mitchell to suggest a sequel. Martin was willing and agreed to do it, but before he got started he got an offer from Hollywood, where producer Philip DeGuere Jr. wanted to adapt The Armageddon Rag into a film. The film adaptation did not happen, but they stayed in touch, and when DeGuere became the producer for the revival of The Twilight Zone, Martin was offered a job as a writer. Working for television paid better than writing literature, so he decided to move to Hollywood to seek a new career. At first he worked as staff writer for the show, and then as an executive story consultant.

After the CBS series was cancelled, Martin migrated to the satirical science fiction series Max Headroom. He worked on scripts and created the show's "Ped Xing" character. However, before his scripts could go into production, the ABC show was cancelled in the middle of its second season. Martin was hired as a writer-producer on the new dramatic fantasy series Beauty and the Beast; in 1989, he became the show's co-supervising producer and wrote 14 of its episodes.

In 1987, Martin published a collection of short horror stories in Portraits of His Children. During this same period, Martin continued working in print media as a book-series editor, this time overseeing the development of the multi-author Wild Cards book series, which takes place in a shared universe in which a small slice of post–World War II humanity gains superpowers after the release of an alien-engineered virus; new titles are published in the ongoing series from Tor Books. In Second Person, Martin "gives a personal account of the close-knit role-playing game (RPG) culture that gave rise to his Wild Cards shared-world anthologies". An important element in the creation of the multiple-author series was a campaign of Chaosium's role-playing game Superworld (1983) that Martin ran in Albuquerque. Admitting he became completely obsessed with the game, he stopped writing literature for most of 1983, which he refers to as his "lost year", but his shrinking bank accounts made him realize he had to come up with something, and got the idea that perhaps the stories and characters created in Superworld could somehow become profitable. Martin's own contributions to Wild Cards have included Thomas Tudbury, "The Great and Powerful Turtle", a powerful psychokinetic whose flying "shell" consisted of an armored VW Beetle. As of June 2011, 21 Wild Cards volumes had been published in the series; earlier that same year, Martin signed the contract for the 22nd volume, Low Ball (2014), published by Tor Books. In early 2012, Martin signed another Tor contract for the 23rd Wild Cards volume, High Stakes, which was released in August 2016.

In August 2016, Martin announced that Universal Cable Productions had acquired the rights to adapt the Wild Cards novels into a television series. He noted that he himself would not write for the adaptation due to focusing on A Song of Ice and Fire.

In 2014, Martin said in a BBC interview that he writes using WordStar editor software, on an MS-DOS computer, because he dislikes having his work spell-checked and to avoid internet distractions. He uses a separate computer for common internet tasks.

=== A Song of Ice and Fire ===
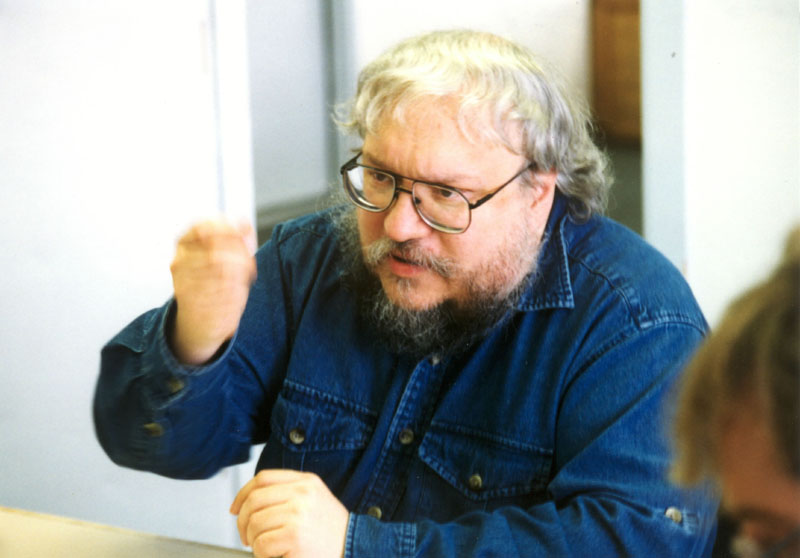
Teaching at Clarion West Writers Workshop, 1998

In 1991, Martin briefly returned to writing novels. He had grown frustrated that his TV pilots and screenplays were not getting made and that TV-related production limitations like budgets and episode lengths were forcing him to cut characters and trim battle scenes. This pushed Martin back towards writing books, where he did not have to worry about compromising his imagination. Admiring the works of J. R. R. Tolkien in his childhood, he wanted to write an epic fantasy, though he did not have any specific ideas.

His epic fantasy series, A Song of Ice and Fire, was inspired by the Wars of the Roses, The Accursed Kings and Ivanhoe. Though Martin originally conceptualized it as being three volumes, it is currently slated to comprise seven. The first, A Game of Thrones, was published in 1996, followed by A Clash of Kings in 1998 and A Storm of Swords in 2000. In November 2005, A Feast for Crows, the fourth novel in this series, became The New York Times No. 1 Bestseller. The fifth book, A Dance with Dragons, was published July 12, 2011, and became an international bestseller, including achieving a No. 1 spot on the New York Times Bestseller List and many others; it remained on the New York Times list for 88 weeks.

In 2012, A Dance with Dragons made the final ballot for science fiction and fantasy's Hugo Award, World Fantasy Award, Locus Poll Award, and the British Fantasy Award; the novel went on to win the Locus Poll Award for Best Fantasy Novel. Two more novels are planned in the series: The Winds of Winter and the final volume A Dream of Spring.

On April 25, 2018, Martin announced the release date of his new book, Fire & Blood, dealing with the history of House Targaryen, which was released on November 20, 2018. Should Martin die before finishing the A Song of Ice and Fire series, former collaborators have said that they will not conclude the series for him.

==== HBO adaptation of A Song of Ice and Fire ====
HBO Productions purchased the television rights for the A Song of Ice and Fire series in 2007. Although busy completing A Dance with Dragons and other projects, Martin was heavily involved in the production of the television series adaptation of his books. Martin's involvement included the selection of a production team and participation in scriptwriting; the opening credits list him as a co-executive producer of the series. The original pilot was shot between October 24 and November 19, 2009, on location in Northern Ireland, Scotland and Morocco. It was received so poorly by HBO executives that they did not make a decision for four months after the pilot was delivered. In March 2010, HBO's decision to greenlight the series was announced, with the production of the series scheduled to start June 2010. However, HBO demanded that the first episode be reshot, and wanted all the scenes from Morocco scrapped. The first episode ("Winter Is Coming") premiered on HBO in the United States and Canada on April 17, 2011. It was seen initially by 2.2 million viewers. The first season was nominated for 13 Emmy Awards, ultimately winning two: one for its opening title credits, and one for Peter Dinklage as Best Supporting Actor.

HBO ordered a second season of Game of Thrones on April 19, 2011, two days after the series premiere. The second season obtained a 15% increase in budget in order to be able to stage the war's most important battle, the Battle of the Blackwater, in episode nine, which was written by Martin. Filming took place during 106 shooting days. During three-quarters of those, two crews ("Dragon" and "Wolf") were working simultaneously in different locations. Alan Taylor was promoted to co-executive producer and directed four episodes, including the season premiere and finale. David Petrarca and David Nutter each directed two episodes, while series cinematographer Alik Sakharov and filmmaker Neil Marshall directed the remaining two. The second season premiered in the United States on HBO on April 1, 2012, and concluded on June 3, 2012. U.S. viewership rose by approximately 8% over the course of the season, from 3.9 million to 4.2 million by the season finale. The second season won six of the twelve Emmy Awards for which it was nominated.

Game of Thrones rapidly became a critical and commercial success after the second season. HBO renewed the series for a third season on April 10, 2012, nine days after the second season's premiere. Production began in July 2012 and concluded with the wrap of the unit filming in Iceland on November 24, 2012. The third season is based on the first half of the novel A Storm of Swords. Benioff had previously said that A Storm of Swords would need to be adapted in two seasons on account of its length. Benioff and Weiss also noted that they thought of Game of Thrones as an adaptation of the series as a whole, rather than of individual novels, which gave them the liberty to move scenes back and forth across novels according to the requirements of the screen adaptation. Season 3 saw the first significant use of the Valyrian languages, spoken in doomed Valyria and its former colonies in Essos. The constructed languages were developed by conlanger David J. Peterson based on the few words Martin invented for the novels. Peterson had previously developed the Dothraki language, used principally in season 1. The third season premiered on HBO on March 31, 2013, and concluded on June 9, 2013. The third season was seen by 14.2 million viewers. It won 2 of the 16 Emmy Awards for which it was nominated.

Two days after third-season premiere, HBO ordered the fourth season on April 2, 2013, which began filming in July 2013. The season is adapted primarily from the second half of A Storm of Swords, along with elements of A Feast for Crows and A Dance with Dragons. Showrunners David Benioff and D. B. Weiss co-wrote seven out of ten episodes. The remaining three episodes were written by Bryan Cogman (two episodes), and George R. R. Martin (one episode). For this season, the filming lasted 136 days and was completed on November 21, 2013. The fourth season premiered in the United States on HBO on April 6, 2014, and concluded on June 15, 2014. The season was met with largely positive reviews. It won four of the 19 Emmy Awards for which it was nominated. With its fourth season, Game of Thrones has become the most-watched HBO series in history (surpassing the fourth season of The Sopranos which had a gross audience of 18.2 million viewers), averaging 18.4 million viewers across multiple platforms, including live viewing, encores, DVR views, HBO GO and On Demand views.

Up until the fourth season, Martin wrote one episode for each season. In 2022, Martin said that he had been estranged from the show during the production process of the last four seasons (starting with season 5). In the early seasons, Martin wrote and read scripts, consulted on casting decisions and visited sets. Over time, however, he stepped back to focus on his long-delayed next "Thrones" novel, The Winds of Winter. Following the success of the fourth season, HBO ordered the fifth season on April 8, 2014, together with the sixth season, which began filming in July 2014. The season primarily adapts the storylines from A Feast for Crows and A Dance with Dragons, also with original content not found in Martin's novels. This season set a Guinness World Record for winning the highest number of Emmy Awards for a series in a single season and year, winning 12 out of 24 nominations, including Outstanding Drama Series.

With a budget over $100 million for the whole season, filming for the sixth season began in July 2015 and ended in December. The season filmed in five different countries: Northern Ireland, Spain, Croatia, Iceland, and Canada. This season saw the overall plot of the show diverging from the source material. Some of the season's storyline is derived from content not yet published in Martin's A Song of Ice and Fire series, although a significant amount of material from A Feast for Crows, A Dance with Dragons and the upcoming sixth novel The Winds of Winter, which Martin previously outlined to showrunners David Benioff and D.B. Weiss, was used. The season was largely met with positive reviews. The "Battle of the Bastards" episode received immense critical acclaim, with many calling it one of the best television episodes of all time. U.S. viewership rose compared to the previous season, and by approximately 13 percent over its course, from 7.9 million to 8.9 million by the finale. The season won 12 of the 23 Emmy Awards for which it was nominated.

Three days before the premiere of the episode "The Red Woman", HBO ordered the seventh season. Due to necessary weather conditions required for filming, the production of the penultimate season of the show was delayed that year. Filming began only on August 31, 2016, at Titanic Studios in Belfast, and ended in February 2017. Unlike previous seasons, the seventh and eighth seasons largely consisted of original content not found in the source material. This season comprised only seven episodes. The showrunners stated that they were unable to produce 10 episodes in the show's usual 12 to 14 month time frame, as Weiss said "It's crossing out of a television schedule into more of a mid-range movie schedule". The average runtime of an episode in this season was approximately 63 minutes. The series received 22 nominations for the 70th Primetime Emmy Awards and won 9 of them, including "Outstanding Drama Series".

Unlike its prior seasons, the final one took a year gap for its production and filming. The eighth season consisted of only six episodes, though the average runtime of an episode was 68 minutes, the longest of all seasons, with "The Long Night" consisting of 81 minutes. The season was met with mixed reviews from critics. While the performances, production values and music score were praised, criticism was mainly directed at the shorter runtime of the season as well as numerous creative decisions made by the showrunners. Many commentators deemed it to be a disappointing conclusion to the series. Despite this, the season received 32 nominations at the 71st Primetime Emmy Awards, the most for a single season of television in history, and won twelve, including Outstanding Drama Series and Outstanding Supporting Actor in a Drama Series for Peter Dinklage.

Three years after the show ended, a prequel series, House of the Dragon, premiered on HBO on August 21, 2022. Based on parts of the novel Fire & Blood, the series is set about 200 years before the events of Game of Thrones. Ryan Condal and Miguel Sapochnik served as the showrunners for the first season. Five days after its premiere, the series was renewed for a second season by HBO. On September 1, Sapochnik departed as showrunner, with another veteran Game of Thrones director Alan Taylor replacing him as the co-showrunner for the second season.

In June 2022, it was reported that a Jon Snow sequel series with Kit Harington to reprise his role was in early development at HBO. The working title is Snow and Martin confirmed his involvement with the project and that Harington initiated the idea. Also in June, Martin said there were still three other live-action series in development: 10,000 Ships (written by Amanda Segal), 9 Voyages aka Sea Snake (written by Bruno Heller), and the Dunk & Egg prequel series (written by Steven Conrad), tentatively titled either The Hedge Knight or Knight of the Seven Kingdoms.

In January 2021, an animated drama series was announced as in development at HBO Max. In July 2021, two more animated series were in development at HBO Max, with one being set in Yi Ti, a nation in Essos loosely based on Imperial China.

=== Themes ===
Martin's work has been described as having "complex story lines, fascinating characters, great dialogue, perfect pacing" by literary critic Jeff VanderMeer. Dana Jennings of the New York Times described Martin's work as "fantasy for grown ups" and Lev Grossman wrote that it was dark and cynical. Martin's first novel, Dying of the Light, set the tone for some of his future work; it unfolds on a mostly abandoned planet that is slowly becoming uninhabitable as it moves away from its sun. This story has a strong sense of melancholy. His characters are often unhappy or, at least, unsatisfied, in many cases holding on to idealisms in spite of an otherwise chaotic and ruthless world, and often troubled by their own self-seeking or violent actions, even as they undertake them. Many have elements of tragic heroes or antiheroes in them; reviewer T. M. Wagner writes: "Let it never be said Martin doesn't share Shakespeare's fondness for the senselessly tragic."

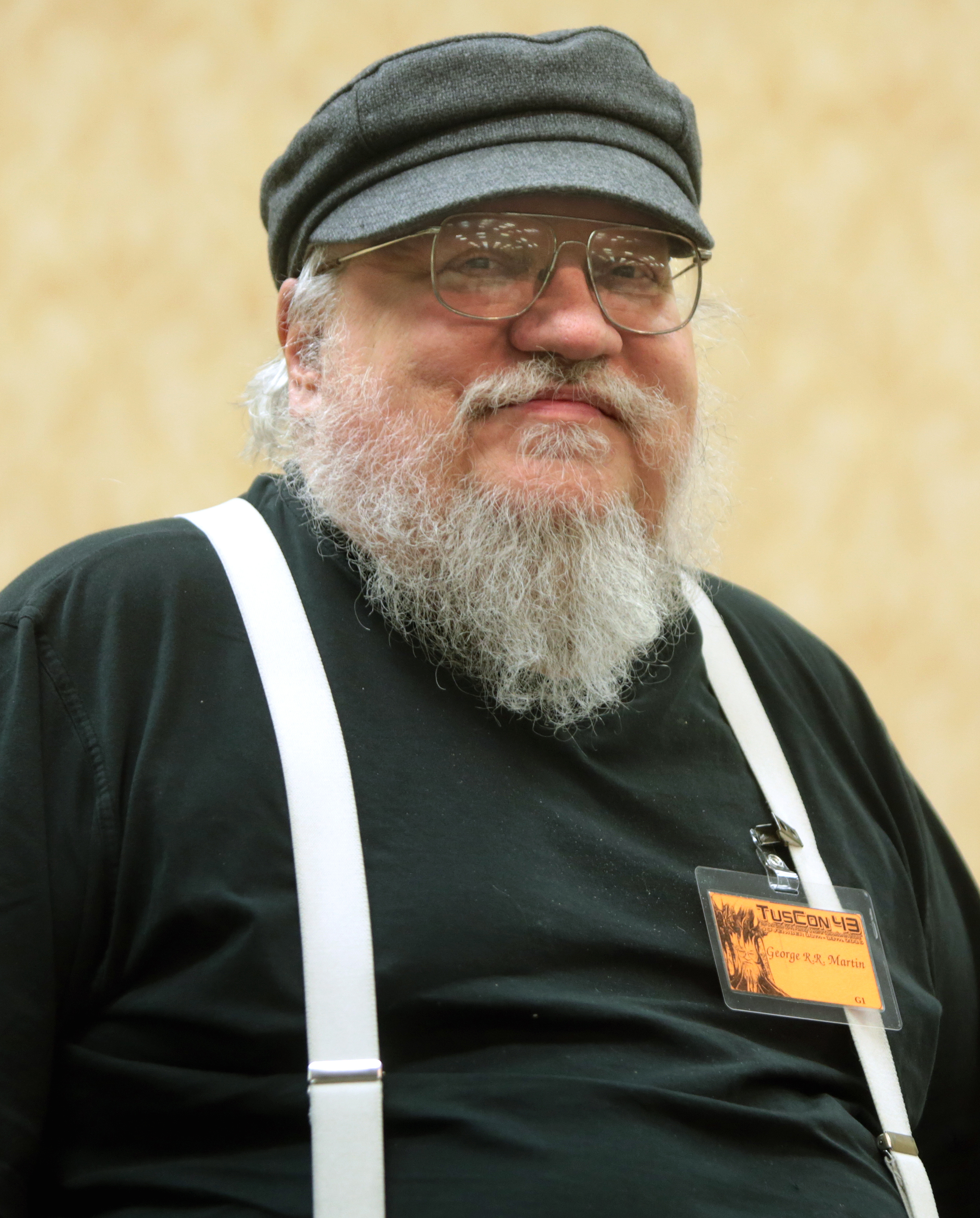
Martin in November 2016

The overall gloominess of A Song of Ice and Fire can be an obstacle for some readers; the Inchoatus Group writes that, "If this absence of joy is going to trouble you, or you're looking for something more affirming, then you should probably seek elsewhere." However, for many fans, it is precisely this level of "realness" and "completeness" – including many characters' imperfections, moral and ethical ambiguity, and (often sudden) consequential plot twists that is endearing about Martin's work. Many find that this is what makes the series' story arcs compelling enough to keep following despite its sheer brutality and intricately messy and interwoven plotlines; as TM Wagner points out:

There's great tragedy here, but there's also excitement, humor, heroism even in weaklings, nobility even in villains, and, now and then, a taste of justice after all. It's a rare gift when a writer can invest his story with that much humanity.

Martin's characters are multifaceted, each with intricate pasts, aspirations, and ambitions. Publishers Weekly writes of his ongoing epic fantasy A Song of Ice and Fire: "The complexity of characters such as Daenerys, Arya and the Kingslayer will keep readers turning even the vast number of pages contained in this volume, for the author, like Tolkien or Jordan, makes us care about their fates." Misfortune, injury, and death (including false death and reanimation) often befall major or minor characters, no matter how attached the reader has become. Martin has described his penchant for killing off important characters as being necessary for the story's depth: "when my characters are in danger, I want you to be afraid to turn the page, (so) you need to show right from the beginning that you're playing for keeps".

In distinguishing his work from others, Martin makes a point of emphasizing realism and plausible social dynamics above an over-reliance on magic and a simplistic "good versus evil" dichotomy, for which contemporary fantasy writing is often criticized. Notably, Martin's work makes a sharp departure from the prevalent "heroic knights and chivalry" schema that has become a mainstay in fantasy as derived from J. R. R. Tolkien's The Lord of the Rings. He specifically critiques the oversimplification of Tolkien's themes and devices by imitators in ways that he has humorously described as "Disneyland Middle Ages", which gloss over or ignore major differences between medieval and modern societies, particularly social structures, ways of living, and political arrangements. Martin has been described as "the American Tolkien" by literary critics. While Martin finds inspiration in Tolkien's legacy, he aims to go beyond what he sees as Tolkien's "medieval philosophy" of "if the king was a good man, the land would prosper" to delve into the complexities, ambiguities, and vagaries of real-life power: "We look at real history and it's not that simple... Just having good intentions doesn't make you a wise king." Per this fact Martin has been credited with the rise of grimdark fantasy, a modern form of an "anti-Tolkien" approach to fantasy writing which, according to British science fiction and fantasy novelist Adam Roberts, is characterized by its reaction to Tolkien's idealism even though it owes a lot to Tolkien's work. The Canadian fantasy writer R. Scott Bakker "says he wouldn't have been able to publish his fantasy novels without the success George R. R. Martin achieved first". Similarly, Mark Lawrence, author of Prince of Thorns, was inspired by Martin and impressed by his Red Wedding scene.

The author makes a point of grounding his work on a foundation of historical fiction, which he channels to evoke important social and political elements of primarily the European medieval era that differ markedly from elements of modern times, including the multigenerational, rigid, and often brutally consequential nature of the hierarchical class system of feudal societies that is in many cases overlooked in fantasy writing. Even as A Song of Ice and Fire is a fantasy series that employs magic and the surreal as central to the genre, Martin is keen to ensure that magic is merely one element of many that moves his work forward, not a generic deus ex machina that is itself the focus of his stories, which is something he has been very conscious about since reading Tolkien; "If you look at The Lord of the Rings, what strikes you, it certainly struck me, is that although the world is infused with this great sense of magic, there is very little onstage magic. So you have a sense of magic, but it's kept under very tight control, and I really took that to heart when I was starting my own series." Martin's ultimate aim is an exploration of the internal conflicts that define the human condition, which, in deriving inspiration from William Faulkner, he ultimately describes as the only reason to read any literature, regardless of genre.

In 2018, Martin called The Lord of the Rings, The Great Gatsby, Gone with the Wind, Great Expectations, Lonesome Dove, Catch-22, and Charlotte's Web "favorites all, towering masterpieces, books that changed my life".

== Producing ==
In 2017, Martin confirmed he would serve as an executive producer of the HBO television series adaptation of the 2010 science fantasy novel Who Fears Death by Nnedi Okorafor. Martin also contributed to the 2022 video game titled Elden Ring, writing the worldbuilding aspects for it. In February 2021, it was reported that Martin and Kalinda Vazquez were developing a TV adaptation of Roadmarks by Roger Zelazny, which Martin pitched to HBO in 2020. Martin will be an executive producer, Vazquez the showrunner, writer and executive producer. In March 2021, he signed an overall deal with HBO. Martin will serve as an executive producer of the Peacock TV adaptation in development of his Wild Cards book series, together with Melinda M. Snodgrass and Vince Gerardis, Martin's manager. He serves as an executive producer of the AMC series Dark Winds based on Tony Hillerman's Leaphorn & Chee books. In 2021, Martin served as one of the producers of the short film Night of the Cooters based on the eponymous short story by Howard Waldrop. Martin is also producing on the Elden Ring movie after he wrote the backstory of the game originally.

== Media appearances ==
Martin made a guest appearance as himself in "El Skeletorito", an episode of the Adult Swim show Robot Chicken. He appeared in SyFy's Z Nation as a zombie version of himself in season two's "The Collector", where he is still signing copies of his new novel. In Sharknado 3: Oh Hell No!, he is killed when watching a movie at the theatre. In the third-season premiere of the AMC's TV show Dark Winds, he appears as "George", opposite co-executive producer Robert Redford, playing chess in a Navajo jail cell.

== Relationship with fans ==
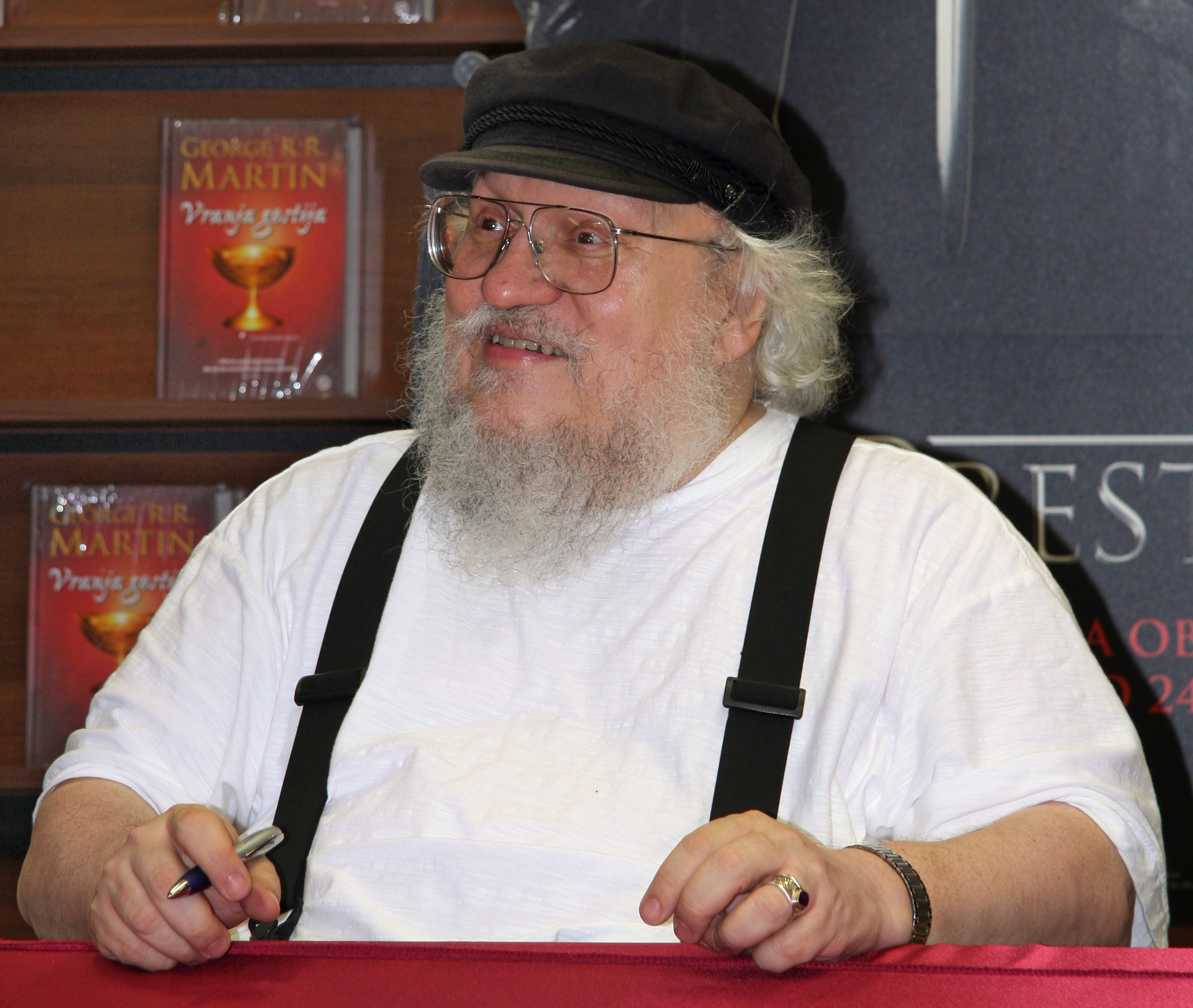
Martin signing books in a bookstore in Ljubljana, Slovenia (June 2011)

Martin actively contributes to his blog, Not a Blog. In April 2018, he moved his blog from Livejournal to his own website.

Martin's official fan club is the "Brotherhood Without Banners", which has a regular posting board at the Forum of the website westeros.org, which is focused on his A Song of Ice and Fire fantasy series. At the annual World Science Fiction Convention every year, the Brotherhood Without Banners hosts a large, on-going hospitality suite that is open to all members of the Worldcon.

Martin has criticized writing fan fiction, which he views as a harmful exercise for aspiring professional authors in terms of developing their skills in worldbuilding and character development, and has asked to remain ignorant to fan works due to potential copyright infringement.

Martin responded to backlash on his Not a Blog about the alleged use of generative AI art in the illustrated edition of A Feast For Crows. His art director and licensing developer, Raya Golden, wrote a blog post addressing the controversy, stating that they have not and never willingly would work with AI generative artists.

=== Conventions ===
Martin is known for his regular attendance at science fiction conventions and comics conventions, and his accessibility to fans. In the early 1980s, critic and writer Thomas Disch identified Martin as a member of the "Labor Day Group", writers who regularly congregated at the annual Worldcon, usually held on or around the Labor Day weekend. Since the early 1970s, he has also attended regional science fiction conventions; further, since 1986, Martin has participated annually in Albuquerque's smaller regional convention Bubonicon, near his New Mexico home. He was the Guest of Honor at the 61st World Science Fiction Convention in Toronto, held in 2003.

In December 2016, Martin was a key speaker at the Guadalajara International Book Fair 2016 in Mexico where the author provided hints about the next two books in the series A Song of Ice and Fire.

In 2020, Martin fulfilled his duties as "toastmaster" of the Hugo Awards. During the event, he mispronounced several names, including that of R. F. Kuang. Martin later apologized for mispronouncing the names.

=== Writing pace ===
Martin has been criticized by his fanbase for the long periods between books in the A Song of Ice and Fire series, notably the six-year gap between the fourth volume, A Feast for Crows (2005), and the fifth volume, A Dance with Dragons (2011), and the fact that the next volume in the series, The Winds of Winter, is still unpublished 15 years later. In 2010, Martin responded to fan criticisms by saying he was unwilling to write only his A Song of Ice and Fire series, noting that working on other prose and compiling and editing different book projects have always been part of his working process.

As the years have gone on without a new book release, some ASOIAF fans believe that he won't finish the series as there has now been more time since the last book as there was between the first and fifth book.

== Personal life ==
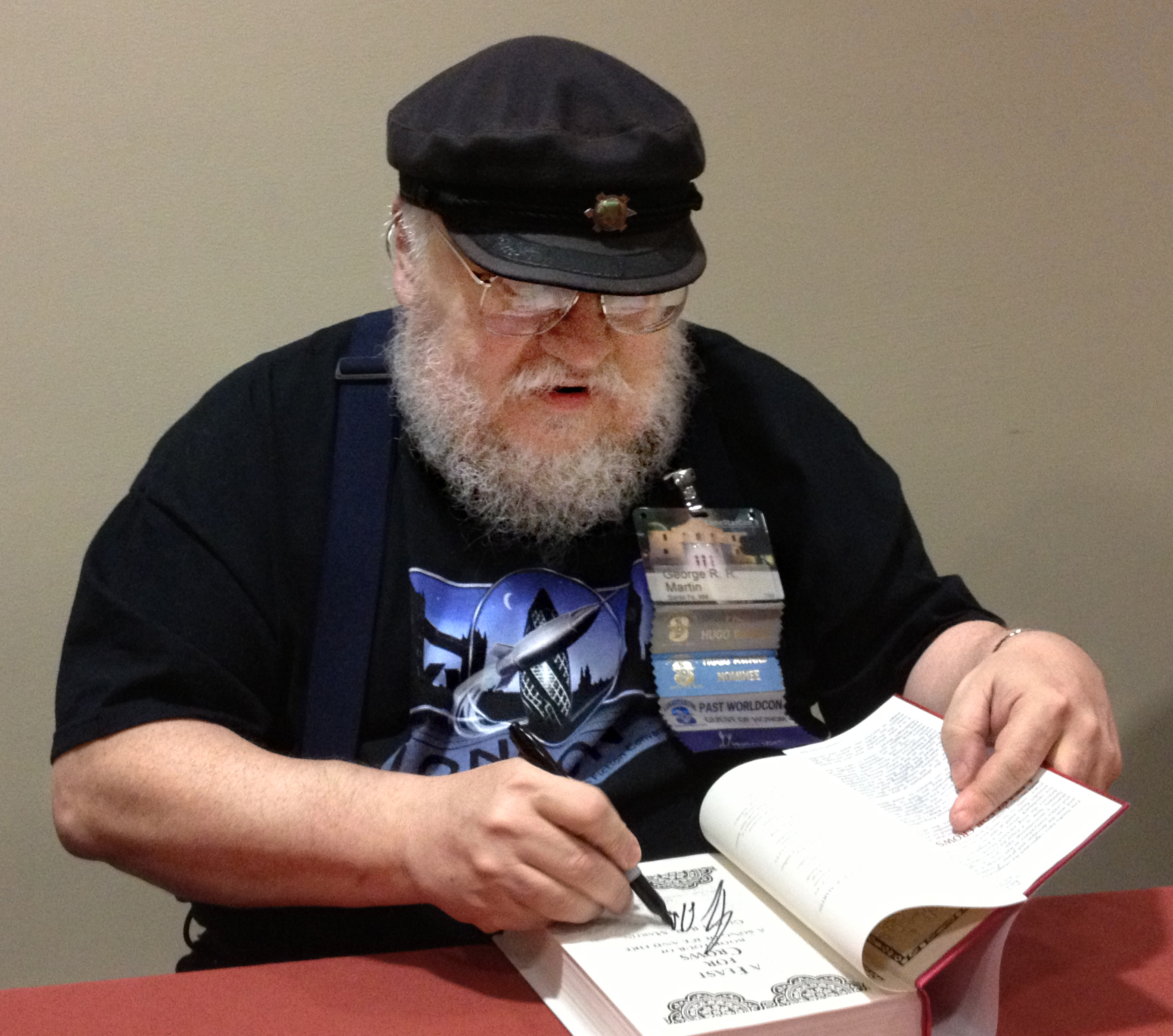
Martin at LoneStarCon 3 (the 71st World Science Fiction Convention), 2013

In the early 1970s, Martin was in a relationship with fellow science fiction/fantasy author Lisa Tuttle, with whom he co-wrote Windhaven.

While attending an East Coast science fiction convention he met his first wife, Gale Burnick; they were married in 1975 and moved from their Chicago apartment and into a house in Dubuque in 1976. Both of them grew tired of the hard winters there, and when she graduated from Clarke University in June 1979, he resigned from his job and they decided to move to New Mexico. The year before, they had "fallen in love" with Santa Fe on their way to the 36th World Science Fiction Convention which was being held in Phoenix. His wife went down and bought a house while Martin stayed behind to sell their home and finish the semester. The marriage ended in divorce in 1979, before they could be reunited in Santa Fe. Instead he settled there alone from December that same year until September 1981, when Parris McBride, who would become his longtime partner, moved in with him. On February 15, 2011, Martin married McBride during a small ceremony at their Santa Fe home. On August 19, 2011, they held a larger wedding ceremony and reception at Renovation, the 69th World Science Fiction Convention. They have no children.

He and McBride are supporters of the Wild Spirit Wolf Sanctuary in New Mexico. In early 2013, he purchased Santa Fe's Jean Cocteau Cinema and Coffee House, which had been closed since 2006. He had the property completely restored, including its original 35mm capability. The restoration also added digital projection and sound; the Cocteau officially reopened for business on August 9, 2013. In 2019, he opened a bookstore named Beastly Books, after Beauty and the Beast, next to Jean Cocteau. Martin has also supported Meow Wolf, an arts collective in Santa Fe, having pledged $2.7 million toward a new art space in January 2015.

In response to a question on his religious views, Martin replied: "I suppose I'm a lapsed Catholic. You would consider me an atheist or agnostic. I find religion and spirituality fascinating. I would like to believe this isn't the end and there's something more, but I can't convince the rational part of me that makes any sense whatsoever."

Martin is a fan of the New York Jets, the New York Giants and the New York Mets. He is also a fan of the Grateful Dead, and says that the band's music may have influenced his work.

== Philanthropy ==
In 2014, Martin launched a campaign on Prizeo to raise funds for Wild Spirit Wolf Sanctuary and the Food Depot of Santa Fe. As part of the campaign, Martin offered one donor the chance to accompany him on a trip to the wolf sanctuary, including a helicopter ride and dinner. Martin also offered those donating $20,000 or more the opportunity to have a character named after them and "killed off" in an upcoming Song of Ice and Fire novel. The campaign garnered media attention and raised a total of $502,549.

In 2017, Martin announced that he was funding The Miskatonic Scholarship. The Miskatonic Scholarship allows a writer of Lovecraftian cosmic horror to attend the Odyssey Writing Workshop, a six-week writing workshop held at Saint Anselm College in Manchester, New Hampshire.

Martin is a cultural advisor for Colossal Biosciences, a biotech and genetic engineering company. He was invited to meet three dire wolves the company had created in February 2025 stating, "Maybe I was remembering a past life, when I ran with a pack in the Ice Age. ... Whatever the reason, I have to say the rebirth of the direwolf has stirred me as no scientific news has since Neil Armstrong walked on the moon."

== Politics ==
Growing up, Martin avoided the draft to the Vietnam War by being a conscientious objector and did two years of alternative service. He generally opposes war and thought the Vietnam War was a "terrible mistake for America". Martin is a member of Writers Against the War on Gaza, an advocacy group critical of the Gaza war.

In the midst of pressure to pull the 2014 feature film The Interview from theaters, the Jean Cocteau Cinema in Santa Fe, New Mexico, which has been owned by Martin since 2013, decided to show the film. Theater manager Jon Bowman told the Santa Fe New Mexican, "Martin feels strongly about the First Amendment and the idea of artists having the ability to speak their minds and not having to worry about being targets."

Martin endorsed Barack Obama for re-election in 2012, calling him the most intelligent president since Jimmy Carter. In 2014, Martin campaigned for New Mexican Senator Tom Udall's reelection bid. Immediately following Bernie Sanders' defeat in the U.S. Democratic primary elections, he supported Democratic nominee Hillary Clinton in the 2016 United States presidential election. After Donald Trump's victory, Martin commented that Trump would "become the worst president in American history".

In May 2019, Martin endorsed Joe Biden's run for president in the 2020 Democratic primary, stating that while Biden was qualified, he would take any Democrat over Trump. In 2026, Martin endorsed Deb Haaland's campaign in the 2026 New Mexico gubernatorial election.

== Awards ==
=== Awards and nominations ===
Work	Year & Award	Category	Result	Ref.
Powerman vs. the Blue Barrier	1965 Alley Award	Fan Fiction	Won	
The Hero	1973 Astounding Award for Best New Writer	—N/a	Nominated	
The Second Kind of Loneliness	1973 Locus Award	Short Fiction	Nominated	
With Morning Comes Mistfall	1974 Nebula Award	Short Story	Nominated	
With Morning Comes Mistfall	1974 Locus Award	Short Fiction	Nominated	
With Morning Comes Mistfall	1974 Hugo Award	Short Story	Nominated	
A Song For Lya	1975 Locus Award	Novella	Nominated	
A Song For Lya	1975 Hugo Award	Novella	Won	
A Song For Lya	1975 Nebula Award	Novella	Nominated	
The Storms of Windhaven (with Lisa Tuttle)	1976 Locus Award	Novella	Won	
The Storms of Windhaven (with Lisa Tuttle)	1976 Hugo Award	Novella	Nominated	
The Storms of Windhaven (with Lisa Tuttle)	1976 Nebula Award	Novella	Nominated	
And Seven Times Never Kill Man	1976 Locus Award	Novelette	Nominated	
And Seven Times Never Kill Man	1976 Hugo Award	Novelette	Nominated	
... for a single yesterday	1976 Locus Award	Novelette	Nominated	
The Tower of Ashes	1977 Locus Award	Short Story	Nominated	
Meathouse Man	1977 Locus Award	Novelette	Nominated	
A Song for Lya and Other Stories	1977 Locus Award	Author Collection	Won	
The Stone City	1978 Locus Award	Short Fiction	Nominated	
The Stone City	1978 Nebula Award	Novelette	Nominated	
Dying of the Light	1978 Locus Award	SF Novel	Nominated	
Dying of the Light	1978 Hugo Award	Novel	Finalist	
Dying of the Light	1979 British Fantasy Award	August Derleth Award	Nominated	
Bitterblooms	1978 Locus Award	Short Fiction	Nominated	
Sandkings	1980 Nebula Award	Novelette	Won	
Sandkings	1980 Balrog Awards	Short Fiction	Nominated	
Sandkings	1980 Locus Award	Novelette	Won	
Sandkings	1980 Hugo Award	Novelette	Won	
Sandkings (Collection)	1982 Locus Award	Single Author Collection	Won	
One-Wing (with Lisa Tuttle)	1980 Analog Award	Serial Novel/Novella	Won	
One-Wing (with Lisa Tuttle)	1981 Hugo Award	Novella	Nominated	
One-Wing (with Lisa Tuttle)	1981 Locus Award	Novella	Nominated	
Nightflyers	1980 Analog Award	Novella/Novelette	Won	
Nightflyers	1981 Locus Award	Novella	Won	
Nightflyers	1981 Hugo Award	Novella	Nominated	
Nightflyers	1983 Seiun Award	Translated Short Story	Won	
Nightflyers (Collection)	1986 Locus Award	Collection	Nominated	
The Way of Cross and Dragon	1980 Locus Award	Short Fiction	Won	
The Way of Cross and Dragon	1980 Hugo Award	Short Story	Won	
The Way of Cross and Dragon	1980 Nebula Award	Short Story	Nominated	
New Voices II	1980 Locus Award	Anthology	Nominated	
New Voices III	1981 Locus Award	Anthology	Nominated	
Guardians	1981 Analog Award	Novella/Novelette	4th Place	
Guardians	1982 Locus Award	Novelette	Won	
Guardians	1982 Hugo Award	Novelette	Nominated	
Windhaven (with Lisa Tuttle)	1982 Locus Award	SF Novel	Nominated	
The Needle Men	1982 Locus Award	Short Story	Nominated	
Remembering Melody	1982 Locus Award	Short Story	Nominated	
New Voices 4	1982 Locus Award	Anthology	Nominated	
Unsound Variations	1983 Locus Award	Novella	Nominated	
Unsound Variations	1983 Hugo Award	Novella	Nominated	
Unsound Variations	1983 Nebula Award	Novella	Nominated	
Fevre Dream	1983 Locus Award	Fantasy Novel	Nominated	
Fevre Dream	1983 World Fantasy Award	Novel	Nominated	
The Armageddon Rag	1984 World Fantasy Award	Novel	Nominated	
The Armageddon Rag	1984 Balrog Awards	Novel	Won	
The Armageddon Rag	1984 Locus Award	Fantasy Novel	Nominated	
The Monkey Treatment	1984 Locus Award	Novelette	Won	
The Monkey Treatment	1984 Hugo Award	Novelette	Nominated	
The Monkey Treatment	1984 Nebula Award	Novelette	Nominated	
The John W. Campbell Awards, Volume 5	1985 Locus Award	Anthology	Nominated	
The Plague Star	1986 Locus Award	Novella	Nominated	
The Plague Star	1986 Analog Award	Serial Novel/Novella	3rd Place	
Loaves and Fishes	1986 Locus Award	Novella	Nominated	
Loaves and Fishes	1986 Analog Award	Novella/Novelette	Won	
Manna From Heaven	1986 Analog Award	Novella/Novelette	2nd Place	
Under Siege	1986 Locus Award	Novelette	Nominated	
Portraits of His Children	1986 Locus Award	Novelette	Nominated	
Portraits of His Children	1986 Hugo Award	Novelette	Nominated	
Portraits of His Children	1986 SF Chronicle Award	Novelette	Won	
Portraits of His Children	1986 Nebula Award	Novelette	Won	
Portraits of His Children (Collection)	1988 Locus Award	Collection	Nominated	
The Glass Flower	1987 Locus Award	Novelette	Nominated	
The Glass Flower	1987 Asimov's Readers' Poll	Novelette	4th Place	
Wild Cards	1987 Locus Award	Anthology	Nominated	
Tuf Voyaging	1987 Locus Award	Collection	Nominated	
Tuf Voyaging	2006 Seiun Award	Translated Long Work	Nominated	
The Pear-Shaped Man	1988 Bram Stoker Award	Long Fiction	Won	
The Pear-Shaped Man	1988 Locus Award	Novelette	Nominated	
The Pear-Shaped Man	1988 World Fantasy Award	Novella	Nominated	
The Pear-Shaped Man	2005 Grand Prix de l'Imaginaire	Foreign Short story/Collection of Foreign Short Stories	Nominated	
Night Visions 3	1987 World Fantasy Award	Collection	Nominated	
Primetime Emmy Awards 1988	Outstanding Drama Series	Beauty and the Beast (Season 1)	Nominated	
The Skin Trade	1989 Bram Stoker Award	Long Fiction	Nominated	
The Skin Trade	1989 Locus Award	Novella	Nominated	
The Skin Trade	1989 World Fantasy Award	Novella	Won	
41st Primetime Emmy Awards 1989	Outstanding Drama Series	Beauty and the Beast (Season 2)	Nominated	
Wild Cards IV: Aces Abroad	1989 Locus Award	Anthology	Nominated	
Blood of the Dragon	1996 Asimov's Readers' Poll	Novella	3rd Place	
Blood of the Dragon	1997 Locus Award	Novella	Nominated	
Blood of the Dragon	1997 HOMer Award	Novella	Nominated	
Blood of the Dragon	1997 World Fantasy Award	Novella	Nominated	
Blood of the Dragon	1997 Hugo Award	Novella	Won	
Blood of the Dragon	1997 Nebula Award	Novella	Nominated	
A Game of Thrones	1997 Locus Award	Fantasy Novel	Won	
A Game of Thrones	1997 World Fantasy Award	Novel	Nominated	
A Game of Thrones	1998 Nebula Award	Novel	Nominated	
A Game of Thrones	2003 Premio Ignotus	Foreign Novel	Won	
Game of Thrones season 1	2012 Hugo Award	Dramatic Presentation: Long Form	Won	
Game of Thrones season 1	63rd Primetime Emmy Awards: 2011	Outstanding Drama Series	Nominated	
Game of Thrones - Episode: Blackwater (as screenwriter)	2013 Hugo Award	Dramatic Presentation: Short Form	Won	
Game of Thrones: Season 2	64th Primetime Emmy Awards: 2012	Outstanding Drama Series	Nominated	
Game of Thrones: Season 3	65th Primetime Emmy Awards: 2013	Outstanding Drama Series	Nominated	
Game of Thrones: Season 4	66th Primetime Emmy Awards: 2014	Outstanding Drama Series	Nominated	
Game of Thrones: Season 5	67th Primetime Emmy Awards: 2015	Outstanding Drama Series	Won	
Game of Thrones: Season 6	68th Primetime Emmy Awards: 2016	Outstanding Drama Series	Won	
Game of Thrones: Season 7	70th Primetime Emmy Awards: 2018	Outstanding Drama Series	Won	
Game of Thrones: Season 8	71st Primetime Emmy Awards: 2019	Outstanding Drama Series	Won	
House of the Dragon: Season 1	75th Primetime Emmy Awards: 2024	Outstanding Drama Series	Nominated	
The Hedge Knight	1999 Locus Award	Novella	Nominated	
The Hedge Knight	1999 World Fantasy Award	Novella	Nominated	
A Clash of Kings	1999 Locus Award	Fantasy Novel	Won	
A Clash of Kings	2000 Nebula Award	Novel	Nominated	
A Clash of Kings	2000 SF Site Readers Poll	SF/Fantasy Book	Won	
A Clash of Kings	2004 Premio Ignotus	Foreign Novel	Won	
Path of the Dragon	2001 Locus Award	Novella	Nominated	
Path of the Dragon	2001 Asimov's Readers' Poll	Novella	4th Place	
Path of the Dragon	2005 Premio Ignotus	Foreign Short Story	Won	
A Storm of Swords	2001 Locus Award	Fantasy Novel	Won	
A Storm of Swords	2001 SF Site Readers Poll	SF/Fantasy Book	Won	
A Storm of Swords	2001 Hugo Award	Novel	Nominated	
A Storm of Swords	2002 Nebula Award	Novel	Nominated	
A Storm of Swords	2002 Geffen Award	Fantasy	Won	
A Storm of Swords	2006 Premio Ignotus	Foreign Novel	Won	
A Storm of Swords	2007 Tähtifantasia Award	-	Nominated	
Quartet	2002 Locus Award	Collection	Nominated	
GRRM: A RRetrospective	2003 International Horror Guild Award	Collection	Nominated	
GRRM: A RRetrospective	2004 Locus Award	Collection	Nominated	
GRRM: A RRetrospective	2004 World Fantasy Award	Collection	Nominated	
GRRM: A RRetrospective	2008 Audie Awards	Science Fiction	Nominated	
The Sworn Sword	2004 Locus Award	Novella	Nominated	
The Ice Dragon	2004 Premio Ignotus	Foreign Short Story	Won	
Shadow Twin	2005 Locus Award	Novella	Nominated	
Shadow Twin	2006 Asimov's Readers' Poll	Novella	4th Place	
A Feast for Crows	2006 Locus Award	Fantasy Novel	Nominated	
A Feast for Crows	2006 SF Site Readers Poll	SF/Fantasy Book	2nd Place	
A Feast for Crows	2006 Hugo Award	Novel	Nominated	
A Feast for Crows	2006 British Fantasy Award	August Derleth Award	Nominated	
A Feast for Crows	2006 Quill Award	SF/Fantasy/Horror Novel	Nominated	
A Feast for Crows	2007 FantLab's Book of the Year Award	Book by Foreign Writer	Won	
Songs of the Dying Earth: Stories in Honor of Jack Vance (with Gardner Dozois)	2010 Locus Award	Anthology	Nominated	
Songs of the Dying Earth: Stories in Honor of Jack Vance (with Gardner Dozois)	2010 World Fantasy Award	Anthology	Nominated	
Songs of the Dying Earth: Stories in Honor of Jack Vance (with Gardner Dozois)	2010 British Fantasy Award	Anthology	Nominated	
Songs of the Dying Earth: Stories in Honor of Jack Vance (with Gardner Dozois)	2014 FantLab's Book of the Year Award	Anthology	Nominated	
Warriors (with Gardner Dozois)	2011 Locus Award	Anthology	Won	
Warriors (with Gardner Dozois)	2012 FantLab's Book of the Year Award	Anthology	Won	
The Mystery Knight	2011 Locus Award	Novella	Nominated	
The Mystery Knight	2011 World Fantasy Award	Novella	Nominated	
The Mystery Knight	2012 FantLab's Book of the Year Award	Translated Novella or Short Story	Won	
Hunter's Run (with Daniel Abraham & Gardner Dozois)	2011 Seiun Award	Translated Long Work	Nominated	
A Dance with Dragons	2011 Goodreads Choice Awards	Favorite Book of 2011	Nominated	
A Dance with Dragons	2011 Goodreads Choice Awards	Fantasy	Won	
A Dance with Dragons	2012 FantLab's Book of the Year Award	Translated Novel/Collection	Nominated	
A Dance with Dragons	2012 SF Site Readers Poll	SF/Fantasy Book	6th Place	
A Dance with Dragons	2012 British Fantasy Award	Robert Holdstock Award	Nominated	
A Dance with Dragons	2012 British Fantasy Award	August Derleth Award	Nominated	
A Dance with Dragons	2012 Locus Award	Fantasy Novel	Won	
A Dance with Dragons	2012 World Fantasy Award	Novel	Nominated	
A Dance with Dragons	2012 Hugo Award	Novel	Nominated	
A Dance with Dragons	2013 Geffen Award	Fantasy	Won	
A Dance with Dragons	2018 Goodreads Choice Awards	Best of the Best	Nominated	
The Princess and the Queen	2014 Locus Award	Novella	Nominated	
Old Mars (with Gardner Dozois)	2014 Locus Award	Anthology	Won	
Old Mars (with Gardner Dozois)	2014 FantLab's Book of the Year Award	Anthology	Nominated	
Dangerous Women (with Gardner Dozois)	2014 World Fantasy Award	Anthology	Won	
Dangerous Women (with Gardner Dozois)	2015 Audie Awards	Short Stories or Collections	Nominated	
A Night at the Tarn House	2014 FantLab's Book of the Year Award	Translated Novella/Short Story	Won	
Rogues (with Gardner Dozois)	2015 World Fantasy Award	Anthology	Nominated	
Rogues (with Gardner Dozois)	2015 Locus Award	Anthology	Won	
Rogues (with Gardner Dozois)	2015 FantLab's Book of the Year Award	Anthology	Won	
The Rogue Prince, or, the King's Brother	2015 FantLab's Book of the Year Award	Translated Novella/Short Story	Nominated	
A Knight of the Seven Kingdoms	2016 Locus Award	Collection	Nominated	
The World of Ice & Fire: The Untold History of Westeros and The Game of Thrones (with Elio M. García Jr. and Linda Antonsson)	2016 Premio Ignotus	Non-Fiction	Nominated	
Old Venus (with Gardner Dozois)	2016 Locus Award	Anthology	Won	
Fire and Blood	2019 Locus Award	Collection	Nominated	
Fire and Blood	2019 Goodreads Choice Awards	Fantasy	Nominated	
The Storm of Swords: The Illustrated Edition (with Gary Gianni)	2021 Locus Award	Illustrated and Art Book	Nominated	
Elden Ring (with Hidetaka Miyazaki)	2022 Nebula Award	Game Writing	Won	

Other awards won:

- 1988: Inkpot Award
- 2004: Edward E. Smith Memorial Award
- 2009 & 2010: Galaxy Award (Most Popular Foreign Writer)
- 2012: World Fantasy Award (Life Achievement Award)
- 2018: International Thriller Writers Awards "Thrillermaster" Award
- 2019: Irish Book Awards (International Recognition Award)

=== State and academic honors ===
State and academic honors for Martin
Country or organization	Year	Award	Ref(s)
New Jersey Hall of Fame	2019	Arts & Entertainment	
Northwestern University	2015	Medill Hall of Achievement Award	
Northwestern University	2021	Doctor of Humane Letters	

== Published works ==
=== As writer ===
==== Novels ====
A Song of Ice and Fire and related works:

- A Song of Ice and Fire series:
  1. A Game of Thrones (1996)
  2. A Clash of Kings (1998)
  3. A Storm of Swords (2000)
  4. A Feast for Crows (2005)
  5. A Dance with Dragons (2011)
  6. The Winds of Winter (planned)
  7. A Dream of Spring (planned)
- Prequels:
  - Tales of Dunk and Egg series:
    1. A Knight of the Seven Kingdoms (2015), collection of 3 novellas:
      1. The Hedge Knight (1998)
      2. The Sworn Sword (2003)
      3. The Mystery Knight (2010)
  - Fire & Blood (2018)
    1. House Targaryen novella series:
      1. The Princess and the Queen, or, the Blacks and the Greens (2013) (Novella)
      2. The Rogue Prince, or, a King's Brother (2014) (prequel) (Novelette)
      3. The Sons of the Dragon (2017) (prequel) (Novella)
- Companion Books:
  - The Lands of Ice and Fire (2012)
  - The Wit & Wisdom of Tyrion Lannister (2013)
  - The World of Ice & Fire (2014), with Elio M. García Jr. and Linda Antonsson
  - The Rise of the Dragon (2022), with Elio M. García Jr. and Linda Antonsson
- Chapter Sets:
  - Blood of the Dragon (1996)
  - Path of the Dragon (2000)
  - Arms of the Kraken (2002)

Stand-alones:

- Dying of the Light (1977)
- Windhaven (1981), with Lisa Tuttle, fix-up novel of 3 novellas:
  "Storms", "One-Wing", "The Fall"
- Fevre Dream (1982)
- The Armageddon Rag (1983)
- Tuf Voyaging (1986), fix-up novel of 7 novellas/novelettes:
  "The Plague Star" (novella), "Loaves and Fishes" (novella), "Guardians" (novelette), "Second Helpings" (novelette), "A Beast for Norn" (novelette), "Call Him Moses" (novelette), "Manna from Heaven" (novella)
- Hunter's Run (2007), with Daniel Abraham and Gardner Dozois, a heavily rewritten and expanded version of an earlier novella called Shadow Twin

==== Children's novels ====
- The Ice Dragon (novelette)

==== Short stories ====
Collections:

- A Song for Lya, or A Song for Lya and Other Stories (1976), collection of 8 short stories and 2 novellas/novelettes:
  "With Morning Comes Mistfall", "The Second Kind of Loneliness", "Override" (novelette), "Dark, Dark Were the Tunnels", "The Hero", "FTA", "Run to Starlight", "The Exit to San Breta", "Slide Show", "A Song for Lya" (novella)
- Songs of Stars and Shadows (1977), collection of 8 short stories and 1 novelette:
  "This Tower of Ashes", "Patrick Henry, Jupiter, and the Little Red Brick Spaceship", "Men of Greywater Station", "The Lonely Songs of Laren Dorr", "Night of the Vampyres", "The Runners", "Night Shift", "...For a Single Yesterday", "And Seven Times Never Kill Man" (novelette)
- Sandkings (1981), collection of 3 short stories and 4 novelettes:
  "The Way of Cross and Dragon" (novelette), "Bitterblooms" (novelette), "In the House of the Worm", "Fast-Friend", "The Stone City" (novelette), "Starlady", "Sandkings" (novelette)
- Songs the Dead Men Sing (1983), collection of 5 short stories and 4 novelettes/novellas:
  "The Monkey Treatment" (novelette), "...For a Single Yesterday", "In the House of the Worm", "The Needle Men", "Meathouse Man" (novelette), "Sandkings" (novelette), "This Tower of Ashes", "Nightflyers" (novella), "Remembering Melody"
- Nightflyers, or Nightflyers and Other Stories (1985), collection of 6 novelettes/novellas:
  "Nightflyers" (novella), "Override" (novelette), "Weekend in a War Zone" (novelette), "And Seven Times Never Kill Man" (novelette), "Nor the Many-Colored Fires of a Star Ring" (novelette), "A Song for Lya" (novella)
- Portraits of His Children (1987), collection of 5 short stories and 6 novelettes/novellas:
  "With Morning Comes Mistfall", "The Second Kind of Loneliness", "The Last Super Bowl" (novelette), "The Lonely Songs of Laren Dorr", "The Ice Dragon" (novelette), "In the Lost Lands", "Unsound Variations" (novella), "Closing Time", "Under Siege" (novelette), "The Glass Flower" (novelette), "Portraits of His Children" (novelette)
- Quartet (2001), collection of 1 short story and 3 novellas:
  "Blood of the Dragon" (novella part of A Game of Thrones), "Black and White and Red All Over", "Starport" (novella), "Skin Trade" (novella)
- Dreamsongs: A RRetrospective, or GRRM: A RRetrospective (2003), collection of 11 short stories, 21 novelettes/novellas and 2 screenplays:
  A Four-Color Fanboy: "Only Kids Are Afraid of the Dark", "The Fortress", "And Death His Legacy"
  The Filthy Pro: "The Hero", "The Exit to San Breta", "The Second Kind of Loneliness", "With Morning Comes Mistfall"
  The Light of Distant Stars: "A Song for Lya" (novella), "This Tower of Ashes", "And Seven Times Never Kill Man" (novelette), "The Stone City" (novelette), "Bitterblooms" (novelette), "The Way of Cross and Dragon" (novelette)
  The Heirs of Turtle Castle: "The Lonely Songs of Laren Dorr", "The Ice Dragon" (novelette), "In the Lost Lands"
  Hybrids and Horrors: "Meathouse Man" (novelette), "Remembering Melody", "Sandkings" (novelette), "Nightflyers" (novella), "The Monkey Treatment" (novelette), "The Pear-Shaped Man" (novelette)
  A Taste of Tuf: "A Beast for Norn" (novelette part of Tuf Voyaging), "Guardians" (novelette part of Tuf Voyaging)
  The Siren Song of Hollywood: "The Road Less Traveled" (screenplay), "Doorways" (screenplay)
  Doing the Wild Card Shuffle: "Shell Games" (novelette), "From the Journal of Xavier Desmond" (novella)
  The Heart in Conflict: "Under Siege" (novelette), "The Skin Trade" (novella), "Unsound Variations" (novella), "The Glass Flower" (novelette), "The Hedge Knight" (novella; series A Knight of the Seven Kingdoms #1), "Portraits of His Children" (novelette)

Uncollected short stories:

- Captain Weird: The Sword and the Spider (1970) (with Howard Keltner & Jim Starlin)
- A Peripheral Affair (1973)
- Nobody Leaves New Pittsburg (1976)
- The Computer Cried Charge! (1976)
- Warship (1979) (with George Guthridge)
- From the New York Times (1988)
- The Toys of Caliban (2005) (Teleplay)
- A Night at the Tarn House (2009)

=== As editor ===
- New Voices in Science Fiction (1977: new stories by the John W. Campbell Award winners)
- New Voices in Science Fiction 2 (1979: more new stories by the John W. Campbell Award winners)
- New Voices in Science Fiction 3 (1980: more new stories by the John W. Campbell Award winners)
- New Voices in Science Fiction 4 (1981: more new stories by the John W. Campbell Award winners)
- The Science Fiction Weight Loss Book (1983) edited with Isaac Asimov and Martin H. Greenberg ("Stories by the Great Science Fiction Writers on Fat, Thin, and Everything in Between")
- The John W. Campbell Awards, Volume 5 (1984, continuation of the New Voices in Science Fiction series)
- Night Visions 3 (1986)

==== Wild Cards series editor (also contributor to many volumes) ====
- Wild Cards (1987; contents expanded in 2010 edition with three new stories/authors)
- Wild Cards II: Aces High (1987)
- Wild Cards III: Jokers Wild (1987)
- Wild Cards IV: Aces Abroad (1988; Book I of the Puppetman Quartet; contents expanded in 2015 edition with two new stories/authors)
- Wild Cards V: Down & Dirty (1988; Book II of the Puppetman Quartet)
- Wild Cards VI: Ace in the Hole (1990; Book III of the Puppetman Quartet)
- Wild Cards VII: Dead Man's Hand (1990; Book IV of the Puppetman Quartet)
- Wild Cards VIII: One-Eyed Jacks (1991; Book I of the Rox Triad)
- Wild Cards IX: Jokertown Shuffle (1991; Book II of the Rox Triad)
- Wild Cards X: Double Solitaire (1992)
- Wild Cards XI: Dealer's Choice (1992; Book III of the Rox Triad)
- Wild Cards XII: Turn of the Cards (1993)
- Wild Cards XIII: Card Sharks (1993; Book I of the Card Shark Triad)
- Wild Cards XIV: Marked Cards (1994; Book II of the Card Shark Triad)
- Wild Cards XV: Black Trump (1995; Book III of the Card Shark Triad)
- Wild Cards XVI: Deuces Down (2002)
- Wild Cards XVII: Death Draws Five (2006; solo novel by John J. Miller)
- Wild Cards XVIII: Inside Straight (2008; Book I of The Committee triad)
- Wild Cards XIX: Busted Flush (2008; Book II of The Committee triad)
- Wild Cards XX: Suicide Kings (2009; Book III of The Committee triad)
- Wild Cards XXI: Fort Freak (2011; Book I of the Mean Streets Triad)
- Wild Cards XXII: Lowball (2014; Book II of the Mean Streets Triad)
- Wild Cards XXIII: High Stakes (2016; Book III of the Mean Streets Triad)
- Wild Cards XXIV: Mississippi Roll (2017; Book I of the American Triad)
- Wild Cards XXV: Low Chicago (2018; Book II of the American Triad)
- Wild Cards XXVI: Texas Hold 'Em (2018; Book III of the American Triad)
- Wild Cards XXVII: Knaves Over Queens (2019; Book I of the British Arc)
- Wild Cards XXVIII: Three Kings (2020; Book II of the British Arc)
- Wild Cards XXIX: Joker Moon (2021)
- Wild Cards XXX: Full House (2022)
- Wild Cards XXXI: Pairing Up (2023)
- Wild Cards XXXII: Sleeper Straddle (2024)
- Wild Cards XXXIII: House Rules (2025)

==== Cross-genre anthologies edited (with Gardner Dozois) ====
- Songs of the Dying Earth (2009; a tribute anthology to Jack Vance's Dying Earth series, first published by Subterranean Press)
- Warriors (2010; a cross-genre anthology featuring stories about war and warriors; winner of the 2011 Locus Poll Award for Best Original Anthology)
- Songs of Love and Death (2010; a cross-genre anthology featuring stories of romance in fantasy and science fiction settings, originally entitled Star Crossed Lovers)
- Down These Strange Streets (2011; a cross-genre anthology that blends classic detective stories with fantasy and science fiction)
- Old Mars (2013; a science fiction anthology featuring all new, retro-themed stories about the Red Planet)
- Dangerous Women (2013; a cross-genre anthology focusing on women warriors and strong female characters, originally titled Femmes Fatale)
- Rogues (2014; a cross-genre anthology featuring new stories about assorted rogues)
- Old Venus (2015 publication; an anthology of all new, retro-themed Venus science fiction stories)

== Filmography ==
=== Film ===
Year	Title	Actor	Writer	Producer	Notes
1987	Nightflyers	No	Yes	No	Based on the novella of the same name
2015	Sharknado 3: Oh Hell No!	Yes	No	No	Himself
2018	Meow Wolf: Origin Story	Yes	No	Executive	Documentary, Himself
2025	In the Lost Lands	No	No	No	Based on the short story of the same name
2028	Elden Ring	No	No	Yes	

=== Television ===
Year	Title	Actor	Writer	Executive producer	Notes
1984	The Hitchhiker	No	No	No	Episode: "Remembering Melody" based on the short story Remembering Melody
1986	The Twilight Zone	No	Yes	No	5 episodes
1987–1990	Beauty and the Beast	Yes	Yes	Co-supervising	Wrote 13 episodes, role: Subway rider, Restaurant Patron
1993	Doorways	No	Yes	Yes	Unaired pilot
1995	The Outer Limits	No	No	No	Episodes: "The Sandkings" based on Sandkings
2011–2019	Game of Thrones	Yes	Yes	Co-executive	Wrote episodes: "The Pointy End", "Blackwater", "The Bear and the Maiden Fair" and "The Lion and the Rose" cameo in original unaired pilot
2014	Robot Chicken	Yes	No	No	Roles: Himself/Father (voices)
2015	Z Nation	Yes	No	No	Himself
2018	Nightflyers	No	No	Yes	Based on the novella and series of short stories of the same name
2022–present	House of the Dragon	No	No	Yes	Creator
2022–present	Dark Winds	Yes	No	Yes	Cameo in season 3, episode 1
2026–present	A Knight Of The Seven Kingdoms	No	No	Yes	Creator

=== Video games ===
Year	Title	Writer	Executive producer	Notes
2012	Game of Thrones	No	Yes	
2022	Elden Ring	Yes	No	Worldbuilding
