= Tuf Voyaging =

1986 science fiction fix-up novel by George Martin

- First edition Cover Art by David Willson
- Author: George R. R. Martin
- Language: English
- Genre: Science-fiction
- Publisher: Baen Books
- Publication date: 1986

Tuf Voyaging is a 1986 science fiction fix-up novel by American writer George R. R. Martin, first published in hardcover by Baen Books. It is a darkly comic meditation on environmentalism and absolute power.

This novel is a collection of related short fiction works, originally published over several years, beginning with 1976's "A Beast for Norn". The book includes a prologue and Martin's S'uthlam storyline (published in Analog Science Fiction and Fact), adding them as bridging material, and gathering them with other Tuf stories into one episodic novel.

The novel concerns the (mis)adventures of Haviland Tuf, an exceptionally tall, bald, very pale, overweight, phlegmatic, vegetarian, cat-loving-but-otherwise solitary space trader. Tuf inadvertently becomes the master of the Ark, an ancient, 30-kilometre-long (19 mi) "seedship" – a very powerful warship with advanced ecological engineering capabilities – after a deal between several of his venal and cutthroat passengers goes awry. Tuf travels the galaxy, offering his services to worlds with environmental problems, and sometimes imposing solutions of his own.

The stories in Tuf Voyaging are set in the same fictional "Thousand Worlds" universe as several of Martin's other works, including Dying of the Light, Sandkings, Nightflyers, A Song for Lya and "The Way of Cross and Dragon".

Martin cited fantasy fiction and science fiction Grand Master Jack Vance as having a large influence on his Tuf stories, and he emulated Vance's writing style in most of them.

In 2006, Tuf Voyaging was nominated for a Seiun Award in Japan for translated long form novel. Several of the individual stories have also been honored. In 1982, "Guardians" won the Locus Award for Best Novelette and was nominated for the Hugo Award for Best Novelette. In the 1986 Analog Readers Poll in the novella/novelette category, "Loaves and Fishes" won and "Manna from Heaven" took second place.

== Contents ==
1. "The Plague Star" (Analog Science Fiction and Fact, January/February 1985)
2. "Loaves and Fishes" (Analog Science Fiction and Fact, October 1985)
3. "Guardians" (Analog Science Fiction and Fact, October 1981)
4. "Second Helpings" (Analog Science Fiction and Fact, November 1985)
5. "A Beast for Norn" (Andromeda I, 1976)
6. "Call Him Moses" (Analog Science Fiction and Fact, February 1978)
7. "Manna from Heaven" (Analog Science Fiction and Fact, December 1985)

== "The Plague Star" ==
The story begins with four people requiring interstellar transport: Celise Waan, a scholar of anthropology; Jefri Lion, a scholar and retired soldier; Anittas, a cybertech; and Kaj Nevis, the leader of the expedition. They hire Rica Dawnstar, a mercenary bodyguard, and acquire the services of Haviland Tuf, a not-very-successful trader.

Their destination is a so-called "plague star," known to inflict disease and pestilence on every third generation of a small, remote world. It turns out to be an enormous, abandoned seedship of the long-defunct Federal Empire's Ecological Engineering Corps, developed by the Corps to rewrite genetic coding for entire planets, for good or for ill. Tuf's ship, the Cornucopia of Excellent Goods at Low Prices, is damaged by the seedship's automated defenses, and three of the occupants, Nevis, Anittas, and Dawnstar, board the seedship by means of pressure suits, betraying and leaving the others to await eventual death through asphyxiation. However, Tuf locates a microchip allowing him, Waan, and Lion to land the Cornucopia safely on the seedship.

Nevis, who has stolen a bulky but extremely powerful alien exoskeleton from Tuf's ship, violently forces Anittas, a cyborg, to invade the ship's circuits. In the process, Anittas's suit is torn, and he contracts a plague from the air. Alarmed by this brutality and worried Nevis will use his suit's power to subjugate her as well, Dawnstar runs away from Nevis, ultimately finding the vast seedship's control room. Anittas, meanwhile, betrays Nevis, releasing several of the ship's macroscopic bioweapons, including acid-spitting "hellkittens"; hyper-aggressive, carnivorous, bat-like creatures; spider-like, unimaginably sharp-edged organisms known as "walking webs"; and a T. rex. Furious at his treachery, Nevis kills the dying Anittas.

Meanwhile, Waan, Lion, and Tuf have found the armory, but have split up due to disagreements on leadership. They quickly discover that the air is poisoned with various plagues, which Waan determines using one of Tuf's cats, Mushroom. Tuf recognizes that Mushroom is infected by the plagues and is dying, and kills him gently, preventing Mushroom's further suffering. He discovers the cloning room of the seedship, and clones Mushroom using the ship's equipment, naming the new cat Chaos.

Waan is found by the hellkittens, which spray her with acid and corrode her helmet, impairing her vision. Disbelieving Tuf's warning, she takes her helmet off and contracts a plague. When the hellkittens return to eat her, she is not only weakened by illness but unprotected by her helmet. Though mostly paralyzed and dying, she manages to activate a grenade, destroying herself along with the hellkittens.

Lion, meanwhile, sets a trap for Nevis in a corridor by rigging a plasma cannon to go off only when objects of certain dimensions, such as Nevis's battle-suit, pass in front of it. While luring Nevis toward the trap, however, he is killed and partly eaten by the bat-like creature.

Rica Dawnstar, in charge of the control room, uses reverse psychology to trick Nevis into meeting the walking web, which kills him. She then offers Tuf the chance to leave peacefully, but on his refusal, attempts to kill him with the psi-controlled T. Rex. But Tuf has discovered Lion's plasma-cannon trap; he lures Dawnstar and the dinosaur into its line of fire, killing them. Tuf then takes control of the seedship as the only surviving claimant.

The novella was adapted into a graphic novel and illustrated by Hugo Award–nominated artist Raya Golden, published by Ten Speed Graphic in October 2023.

== "Loaves and Fishes" ==
Haviland Tuf takes his newly acquired seedship, which he has named the Ark, to the world of S'uthlam (an anagram for Malthus) for extensive repairs. S'uthlam is a world on the verge of war with all of the nearby inhabited worlds, as it requires a constant flow of resources to the planet. This is due to the world's continuing population explosion, a result of the S'uthlamese religious belief that unfettered and unchecked human reproduction will one day lead to a world of gods. This is in spite of evidence that this population explosion will lead, as it has many times in the past, to famine and S'uthlamese attempts at military conquest of adjoining star systems.

Once the S'uthlamese become aware of the Ark and its capabilities, they want to seize it for themselves to use it as both a resource to wring higher caloric production from their star system's biology, and also as a powerful weapon of war. In an attempt to secure it, Portmaster Tolly Mune kidnaps one of Tuf's cats. She makes a bet with Tuf – if he will solve S'uthlam's impending famine, she will return his cat and give him monetary credits for the ship's repairs. If he loses the bet, S'uthlam will keep the seedship.

Tuf at first reasonably proposes that the S'uthlamese simply restrict their incontinent reproductive practices, but because the S'uthlamese fixation is fanatic, it is impervious to reason. They will not control their population growth, and thus drive obsessively into a suicidal future of starvation and war.

Tuf works on the problem, and manages to find a solution whereby he uses the seedship's capabilities to provide exotic plants and animals which can yield sustenance for the population, thus staving off starvation for a period of time. The authorities, with striking proof of the Ark's capabilities, now begin scheming to bring it in their possession. Mune, disgusted with the politics of the situation, assists Tuf in escaping from S'uthlam, despite the fact that this places her in a precarious position. He informs her that he will return to pay off his debt.

== "Guardians" ==
Tuf finds himself at Namor, an oceanic world where sea monsters are attacking the local population. As always, he offers to assist for a fee. Before diving into creating the creatures needed to battle the monsters, Tuf begins to study the planet in order to determine why the monsters are attacking the people of Namor. However, during this study, the Namorians grow more desperate and impatient, especially as monsters able to walk on land begin to appear. Tuf's hand is forced, and he unleashes a barrage of other creatures to directly counteract the monsters.

This strategy, initially successful, soon fails as the monsters gain resistance to these otherworldly creatures. Tuf goes back to work, and manages to find a solution. Through his psionically enhanced cat, he discovers a previously unsuspected sapient species native to Namor: the mudpots. Sessile, aquatic bottom-dwellers (which had hitherto been considered dietary delicacies by the Namorian colonists), they are linked telepathically into a kind of hivemind, controlling the lesser species of life on the planet as skilled bio-engineers.

Tuf establishes communications with the mudpots and brokers a peace agreement whereby his human employers agree to cease eating the planet's autochthonous intelligent species. He gives the leaders of Namor psionically enhanced kittens to facilitate their dealings with the mudpots, and departs.

== "Second Helpings" ==
Tuf returns to S'uthlam to pay the first part of his debt. He is hailed as a hero due to the advancements in the overcrowded world's food production, now known as "Tuf's Flowering". This is also due to Tuf and Mune, a highly inaccurate, overly-dramatized movie about Tuf's first adventure on S'uthlam, the creation of which Mune encouraged to build public support for Tuf's plan (and save her political skin from the fallout of helping Tuf escape with Ark).

However, paradoxically, the overpopulation crisis has become even worse due to the S'uthlamese people's over-optimistic response to Tuf's Flowering, increasing their reproduction rates. Tuf works on trying to provide even more-efficient crops and animals. He also insists on delivering a planet-wide speech detailing the enhancements he had in mind for S'uthlam and concluding with an explicit admonition:

The only true and permanent solution is to be found not aboard my Ark, but in the minds and loins of each individual S'uthlamese citizen. You must practice restraint and implement immediate birth control. You must stop your indiscriminate procreation at once!

This is received with predictable religious outrage, and Mune is barely able to extract Tuf from the clutches of an angry S'uthlamese mob.

== "A Beast for Norn" ==
Tuf is approached by Herold Norn, senior beastmaster of the Norn House of Lyronica. The House of Norn requests beasts for gladiatorial fighting in Lyronica's Bronze Arena. After seeing an example of the Arena battles (and, it is strongly implied, being appalled by its barbarity), Tuf agrees to provide a breeding stock of cobalcats (and a stock of innocuous-looking prey animals from the cobalcats' homeworld to be released into the cobalcats' new Lyronican habitat) for the House of Norn.

As the House of Norn racks up victories with their cobalcats, Tuf is approached seriatim by the other houses for ever-more-lethally-effective beasts (and compatible prey animals), until the greatest of the Houses, namely House Arneth-in-the-Gilded-Wood at last approaches him for a beast and also with a demand for him to cease all further dealings with the Houses of Lyronica. Tuf graciously accepts the offer.

Norn returns to Tuf to complain about the cobalcats not mating (and about the prey species reproducing without effective suppression and overrunning the Norn lands, making it impossible for the House of Norn to return to breeding their original Arena beasts). Tuf gets the last laugh, as the introduction of the various prey species into each House's territory irrevocably changes the regional ecosystem such that all become incapable of sustaining the large predators upon which the gladiatorial contests had originally depended, thus leading to the (unstated) end of the Bronze Arena.

== "Call Him Moses" ==
While peaceably eating in a restaurant, Tuf is attacked by Jaime Kreen. Kreen is convicted for the attack and bonded to Tuf as a servant in debt. Kreen explains that his society (a technologically advanced secondary colony established as an arcology on the planet Charity) has been taken over by a primitivist religious leader named Moses. Taking his cues from the Bible, Moses had unleashed plagues on the inhabitants of the arcology, driving them out of their city into the countryside to labor and suffer under Moses' back-to-nature Holy Altruistic Restoration.

Kreen had attempted to murder Tuf because he blames Moses' plagues upon Tuf, who has gained an interstellar reputation as an ecological engineer, and Tuf realizes that Moses' "plagues" (actually low-tech simulations easily imposed by sabotage upon the closed system of an arcology) offer him an opportunity for revenue.

Kreen is sent down to the planet to bring back the former leaders of the now-conquered and evacuated arcology for negotiations, and Tuf offers to help them against Moses for a hefty fee. Using the Ark's technology, Tuf introduces himself to Moses as God, in the guise of a pillar of fire. He afflicts the followers of Moses with the Biblical plagues of legend, but these are widespread planetary ecological assaults instead of Moses' fraudulent localized afflictions.

After two such attacks, Tuf invites Moses aboard the Ark and shows him simulations of the increasingly horrible plagues that he could further inflict upon Moses and his followers. Moses, frightened, gives up his claim on the arcology's population, allowing them to escape his nasty, brutish religious fanaticism and return to the comforts of modern civilization.

== "Manna from Heaven" ==
Tuf returns to S'uthlam for the second time to pay off the last of his debt. This time, S'uthlam is on the brink of war with the allied forces of the neighboring worlds. Mune, now First Councillor or planetary leader, comes aboard the Ark to discuss with Tuf the possibility of acquiring the seedship for S'uthlam's own purposes.

S'uthlam's population problem remains, worse than ever, as Tuf's innovations from his previous visit were not maximally used. Its society is beginning to break down and either a terrible war or utter social collapse seems likely. Tuf labors to find a solution, and calls a meeting of all the worlds about to clash. He presents to them his solution: an edible, mildly addictive plant called "manna", which will freely grow everywhere on S'uthlam and eliminate its hunger problems. After some arm-twisting, in which Tuf threatens to use the military might of his seedship against anyone who refuses, the hostile worlds agree to an armistice. Tuf later tells a horrified Mune that the manna will indeed feed her people, but will also inhibit the libidos of the S'uthlamese and cause widespread, but not universal, infertility. He leaves Mune to make a momentous decision for S'uthlam; it is implied that she accepts the provision of manna to forestall war and famine.

== Character development ==
In the beginning of the novel Tuf is an unassuming and rather inept interstellar trader, of humble and somewhat bland (on the surface) nature, with an aversion to human contact, and a love of cats. As the story progresses, Tuf's character is revealed to be that of Piper's self-reliant man, as the power of the Ark allows him to solve the apparently intractable problems of several worlds. Mune, in explaining why she was helping him escape with the Ark in the first of the S'uthlam stories, says that "Power corrupts . . . and absolute power corrupts absolutely" (an uncredited quotation of the ancient dictum by Lord Acton). Mune further says that she doesn't think that there is such a thing as an incorruptible man, but if there is, Tuf is it. She also says that she wouldn't trust the leaders of her world with the potentially terrible biowarfare capabilities of Ark.

Eventually this becomes a grim prediction. Finding that most of his clients' problems arise not primarily from true ecological catastrophes but rather as the result of their cupidity, stupidity, bureaucracy, religious fanaticism and bloody-mindedness, he resolves their situations by addressing their failings, beginning (in the earliest published story, 1976's "A Beast for Norn") with rendering it impossible for the Great Houses of Lyronica to continue the gladitorial animal contests of the Bronze Arena.

On Namor, he finds a solution: seeking out contact with the previously unsuspected native sapient race that had escaped the "fighting guild" of unthinkingly truculent Guardians to end the attacks being inflicted upon the human colonists by the planet's mudpot hivemind. On Charity, he copes with both the incompetence of the arcology's administrators ("[Y]ou are by training a bureaucrat", says Tuf to Kreen, "and thus good for virtually nothing") and the religious tyranny of Moses' Holy Altruistic Restoration.

Finally, in "Manna from Heaven" (1985), he provides the S'uthlamese and their enemies with an irrevocable solution that simultaneously averts both famine and war but covertly imposes birth control upon the "religious crazies" of S'uthlam's Church of Life Evolving (characterized as "anti-entropists, kiddie-culters, helix-humpers, genepool puddlers"), forcing Mune to accept Tuf's induced population implosion as the only alternative to social breakdown and genocide.

== Possible sequel ==
In a February 2013 post, Martin wrote on his website that, from time to time, he is asked by fans about writing more Tuf stories, and said that he hopes to do so again someday. He also hinted that he thought Irish actor Conleth Hill, who plays Varys on HBO's Game of Thrones, based on his bestselling A Song of Ice and Fire fantasy series, would be a good choice to play Tuf.

== Publishing history ==
- 1986, February – Baen Books, hardcover edition, ISBN 0-671-55985-0
- 1987, March – Baen Books, trade paperback edition, ISBN 0-671-65624-4
- 1990, February – Baen Books, mass-market paperback, ISBN 978-5-551-74032-2
- 2003, November – Meisha Merlin Publishing, illustrated hardcover 2nd edition, ISBN 1-59222-004-5
- 2003, August – Meisha Merlin Publishing, illustrated trade paperback 2nd edition, ISBN 1-59222-005-3
- 2003, November – Meisha Merlin Publishing, 52 signed and lettered (A-Z/AA-ZZ) editions, ISBN 1-59222-015-0
- 2003, November – Meisha Merlin Publishing, 448 signed and numbered slipcased editions, ISBN 1-59222-016-9
- 2013, January – Bantam Spectra, trade paperback edition, ISBN 0-34553-799-8
- 2013, March – Gollancz, Amazon Kindle edition, ASIN B009SS9632

== Reception ==
Dave Langford reviewed Tuf Voyaging for White Dwarf #95, and stated that "Solid entertainment, with Martin's meaty storytelling overcoming some shopworn ideas."

== Reviews ==
- Review by Dan Chow (1986) in Locus, #301 February 1986
- Review by Michael M. Levy (1986) in Fantasy Review, March 1986
- Review by John Gregory Betancourt (1986) in Amazing Stories, July 1986
- Review by Baird Searles (1986) in Isaac Asimov's Science Fiction Magazine, August 1986
- Review by Richard E. Geis (1986) in Science Fiction Review, Fall 1986
- Review by Orson Scott Card (1986) in Worlds of If, September–November 1986
- Review by Don D'Ammassa (1986) in Science Fiction Chronicle, #86 November 1986
- Review by Keith Freeman (1988) in Vector 142
- Review by Ken Lake (1988) in Paperback Inferno, #75
- Review by Paul J. McAuley (1988) in Interzone, #23 Spring 1988
- Review [French] by Pierre-Paul Durastanti (2012) in Bifrost, #67
- Review by Simon Petrie (2013) in Andromeda Spaceways Inflight Magazine, Issue #58
- Review by Don Sakers (2013) in Analog Science Fiction and Fact, July–August 2013
- Review by Paul Cook (2013) in Galaxy's Edge, Issue 5: November 2013
- Review by Norman Spinrad (2014) in Asimov's Science Fiction, July 2014
