= With Morning Comes Mistfall =

1973 short story by George R. R. Martin

With Morning Comes Mistfall is a science fiction story by American author George R. R. Martin, published by Analog Science Fiction and Fact magazine in May 1973. It was the first story by Martin to be nominated for the Hugo Award and Nebula Award. It was later included in his 2003 anthology Dreamsongs: A RRetrospective.

== Summary ==
The story takes place on Wraithworld, a barely habitable planet with unusual weather conditions, including a permanent mist covering most of the planet, which rises up the mountains during the cooler night. Each morning in a wonderful phenomenon called Mistfall, the mist sinks down the mountains, revealing the beauty of the planet.

The planet is home to only a few people, primarily because it is believed that its mist-covered valleys are occupied by "wraiths", ghostly creatures which are claimed to have killed a number of humans. The mystery of the wraiths is also the main tourist attraction on Wraithworld. The only business establishment on the planet is Castle Cloud, a hotel built near the top of one of the mountains, which is primarily visited by "wraith hunters", generally people looking for a thrill.

At the start of the story, an expensive scientific expedition sets out to either find proof of the wraiths' existence, or establish that they are nothing more than a myth. The story, told in first person by one of the reporters covering the expedition, focuses on the conflict between two viewpoints: the leader of the expedition thinks that factual answers for unknowns always benefit humanity, even on a planet with no attractions other than the mystery; by contrast, the owner of Castle Cloud does not want the mystery resolved—not because the answer is something that "man is not meant to know", but because the knowledge will permanently change people's perceptions of the planet, with little scientific gain resulting from the answer.
