= The Sandkings =

- The Outer Limits episode
- Episode no.: Season 1 Episode 1
- Directed by: Stuart Gillard
- Written by: Melinda M. Snodgrass (based on the work by George R. R. Martin)
- Production code: 1
- Original air date: 26 March 1995

Guest appearances
- Beau Bridges as Dr. Simon Kress; Helen Shaver as Cathy Kress; Dylan Bridges as Josh Kress; Kim Coates as Dave Stockley; Lloyd Bridges as Colonel Kress; Patricia Harras as Debbie

Episode chronology
| ← Previous — | Next → "Valerie 23" |

"The Sandkings" is a 1995 Canadian-American television film based on the 1979 novella Sandkings by George R. R. Martin, and the first episode of the revived 1960s science-fiction television series The Outer Limits. It premiered on 26 March 1995 on Showtime and features three generations of the Bridges acting family: Beau, his father Lloyd, and son Dylan. Kim Coates and Helen Shaver also star.

The episode garnered five Gemini Award nominations. One of these was in the category of Best Performance by an Actor in a Leading Role in a Dramatic Program or Mini-Series for Beau Bridges' leading role as Simon Kress, which also garnered nominations for the Primetime Emmy Award for Outstanding Guest Actor in a Drama Series and the CableACE Award for Best Actor in a Dramatic Series.

== Plot ==
Dr. Simon Kress' (Beau Bridges) research for the government on Martian life is aborted because one of his specimens escaped his lab and almost made it to the surface. However, Kress does not agree with the abandonment of the project and decides to continue his experiments in his barn. He steals sand containing Martian eggs from his lab and creates a makeshift incubator to hatch more of the Martian lifeforms, which are dubbed "sandkings." Kress' obsession with the project causes his relationship with his wife Cathy (Helen Shaver) to break down. The family dog, Cowboy, is eaten by sandkings after stepping into their territory, having been awoken by their digging.

The sandkings evolve into two distinct groups, a white group and a red group, and they settle on opposite sides of their glass enclosure. Kress comes to believe that he is a god to his sandkings when the white group builds a sand structure that resembles his face. He smashes the sand structure of the red group who did not do the same, one of them getting loose and stinging him. He kills his former supervisor Dave Stockley (Kim Coates) by tossing him into the enclosure, where the sandkings then devour him. Later, he finds himself in the basement with the red sandkings, who have made a nest with the face of Stockley. He breaks a gas pipe to cause an explosion in an attempt to kill all of the sandkings. In the ending of the episode, a colony of sandkings is shown surviving in the wilderness.

== Aftermath ==
The Sandkings thrived after their escape from Kress' home laboratory. Fragments from the episode are included in the final episode of season one, "The Voice of Reason". There, clips from "The Sandkings" are used to support an argument that the Earth is undergoing a number of different alien invasions. Later in the episode, two alien conspirators acknowledge, in private conversation, that the Sandkings could become a serious problem in about thirty years, assuming that they could survive in a methane-based atmosphere, which the aliens intended to gradually transform from the Earth's human-friendly one.

In the sixth-season episode "Final Appeal", we discover that the Sandkings plague has been eradicated, which took "the better part of a decade" to complete.

== Differences from the original story ==
- The action of the original story Sandkings by George R. R. Martin takes place in the distant future on a faraway planet colonized by humans.
- The original story does not specify the planet of Sandkings' origin.
- Simon Kress is possessed by neither scientific interest nor desire to receive the Nobel Prize but simple cruelty (there is a difference between cruelty and aggression), the application of which influences the sandkings.
- There are no Maws that act to control the Sandkings.
- No betting takes place, even though that is a fairly major plot point in the original story.
- The faces don't change based on the SandKing's perception of their "God".
- There are only 2 groups, not 4.
- There is no psionics explaining any of the characters' action.
- There are two murders instead of at least ten.
- There is no real elaboration about the Sandkings.
- Most of the horror elements have been removed; the original story was mostly science fiction with a small bit of horror.
- All of the actions taken to destroy the SandKings are changed.
- The protagonist is a family man, as opposed to a wealthy bachelor in the novelette.
- Without the Maws and their increasing size and intelligence as well as their psionic ability, there is no way to examine the idea of superintelligence or evolution.
- In the original story, at least one alien is involved in importing the Sandkings; in this retelling, humans bring the Kings back themselves.
- The episode examines the themes of hubris and ecological catastrophe rather than the responsibility of a parent ("God") to a child and how that child will "grow up".

== Awards and nominations ==
- In 1995, for the role of Simon Kress, actor Beau Bridges was nominated for an Emmy Award in the category "Outstanding Guest Actor in a Drama Series".
- In 1996, The Outer Limits TV-series was nominated for some Gemini Awards, including Beau Bridges receiving a nomination in the category "Best Performance by an Actor in a Leading Role in a Dramatic Program or Mini-Series", and the episode "SandKings" was nominated in the category "Best TV Movie or Mini-Series" and "Best Sound in a Dramatic Program or Series". Also, for this episode, Joseph L. Scanlan was nominated for "Best Direction in a Dramatic Program or Mini-Series", and Peter Outerbridge was nominated for Best Performance by an "Actor in a Leading Role in a Dramatic Program or Mini-Series".
- Beau Bridges was nominated for the CableACE Award for Best Actor in a Dramatic Series.
