= Portraits of His Children =

1985 short story by George R. R. Martin

- Author: George R. R. Martin
- Language: English
- Genre: Fantasy, horror
- Publisher: Isaac Asimov's Science Fiction Magazine
- Publication date: November, 1985
- Pages: 46
- Awards: Nebula Award for Best Novelette

"Portraits of His Children" is a 1985 fantasy/horror short story by George R. R. Martin. It was first published in Isaac Asimov's Science Fiction Magazine.

== Synopsis ==
Richard Cantling is an author who finds himself confronted by his characters after they come to life from paintings his daughter, Michelle, painted. They show him that his success as an author was at the cost of him having been a bad person. In a flashback, Michelle calls him out on basing a character, Nicole, and a novel about her sexual assault that occurred when she was younger. The story concludes with Cantling looking at all the portraits of his characters and naming Nicole his true daughter.

== Reception ==
"Portraits of His Children" won the Nebula Award for Best Novelette in 1985, and was a finalist for the 1986 Hugo Award for Best Novelette.
