= The Way of Cross and Dragon =

Short story by George R. R. Martin

"The Way of Cross and Dragon" is a science fiction short story by American writer George R. R. Martin. It involves a far-future priest of the One True Interstellar Catholic Church of Earth and the Thousand Worlds (with similarities to the Roman Catholic hierarchy) investigating a sect that reveres Judas Iscariot. The story deals with the nature and limitations of religious faith.

The story originally appeared in the June 1979 issue of Omni. In 1980, it won the Hugo Award for Best Short Story as well as the Locus Award for best short story. It is set in the same fictional "Thousand Worlds" universe as several of Martin's other works, including Dying of the Light, Sandkings, Nightflyers, A Song for Lya and the stories collected in Tuf Voyaging.

== Plot summary ==
Damien Har Veris — a priest skilled in resolving heretical disputes efficiently, although now spiritually exhausted — is sent by his alien archbishop as Knight Inquisitor to deal with a particular sect that has made a saint of Judas Iscariot.

The sect follows a religious text, The Way of Cross and Dragon, that radically revises the life of Iscariot and his place in Christianity. The text describes how, born of a prostitute, Iscariot mastered the dark arts to become a tamer of dragons and the ruler of a great empire. After torturing and maiming Christ, Iscariot repented and relinquished his empire to become the penitent Legs of Christ, the first and best-beloved of the Twelve Apostles. Returning from proselytizing to find Christ crucified, an enraged Iscariot then destroyed the perpetrating empire and strangled St. Peter for renouncing Christ, only to discover, too late, Christ's resurrection. Rejecting Judas' violence, Christ restored St. Peter to life and gave him the keys of the kingdom. St. Peter then suppressed the truth about Judas, vilifying his name and exploits. Seeking redemption for his wrath, Iscariot became the thousand-year-old Wandering Jew, before finally rejoining Christ in the Kingdom of God.

Perusing the materials of the sect, Har Veris finds himself enjoying the fanciful, creative but ultimately ridiculous narrative, finding it far more interesting than the more mundane heresies that have developed around power, money and doctrinal quibbles.

Arriving on the sect's distant planet on board his ship, the Truth of Christ, Har Veris confronts its heresiarch, Lukyan Judasson, creator of the Way of Cross and Dragon narrative, but finds that he is already expected. Questioning Judasson, Har Veris uncovers a conspiracy of nihilistic Liars, who see Truth as entropy and despair, and who wish to soften and color the ultimately meaningless lives of others by creating belief in carefully crafted Lies. In essence, they create faiths. They have perpetrated this Judas cult as well as others, and now want Har Veris to join them. Despite his own spiritual exhaustion, he realizes that, though he may be losing his faith, he has not lost his passion for truth. When he refuses to join the Liars, Judasson wishes to have him silenced, but his senior in the conspiracy, a misshapen psionic mutant, senses the impending Liar in Har Veris, and allows him to go.

Har Veris then uses political manipulation and the public's fear and distrust of psychic powers to turn the tide on the Judas cult, resolving yet another heresy with dispatch. When, much later, he fully acknowledges that he has lost his faith, his superior is indifferent: results are what is needed, and Har Veris is to continue in his role as inquisitor. The priest accepts this, realizing that the psychic was right: he is himself a consummate Liar, perpetuating a faith in which he no longer believes.

However, departing on his next Inquisition, he has named his new starship Dragon.

== See also ==
- Gospel of Judas

== Footnotes ==
Awards
Preceded by "Cassandra (story)" by C. J. Cherryh	Hugo Award for Best Short Story; 1980	Succeeded by "Grotto of the Dancing Deer" by Clifford D. Simak
