= Songs of Stars and Shadows =

1977 short story collection by George R. R. Martin

First edition

Songs of Stars and Shadows is the second short story collection by author George R. R. Martin. The collection was first published by Pocket Books on July 1, 1977, and contains nine short stories.

The cover of the book was painted by Edward Soyka, based on the story, This Tower of Ashes.

== Contents ==
1. "This Tower of Ashes" (1976)
2. "Patrick Henry, Jupiter, and the Little Red Brick Spaceship" (1976)
3. "Men of Greywater Station" (1976)
4. "The Lonely Songs of Laren Dorr" (1976)
5. "Night of the Vampyres" (1975)
6. "The Runners" (1975)
7. "Night Shift" (1973)
8. "...For a Single Yesterday" (1975)
9. "And Seven Times Never Kill Man" (1975), novelette
