= Nightflyers =

Novella by George R. R. Martin

Nightflyers is a science fiction horror novella by American writer George R. R. Martin, released as a short novella in 1980 and as an expanded novella in 1981. A short story collection of the same name was released in 1985 that includes the expanded novella. In 1987, the short novella was adapted into a film by the same name. A 2018 television adaptation of the extended novella was developed. It premiered on December 2, 2018, on the SyFy Channel, and was cancelled after a single season in February 2019.

== Setting ==
Nightflyers is set in the distant future. In the distant past, the humans of the Federated Nations of Earth discovered the stardrive. The Federated Nations of Earth eventually morphed into the Federal Empire. For a thousand years, humanity waged war with an alien species called the Hrangan, which caused the collapse of the Federal Empire. Humanity is interested in acquiring the advanced interstellar technology of the volcryn, an enigmatic alien species.

== Plot summary ==
A nine-member team of Academy scholars from the planet Avalon led by the astrophysicist Karoly d'Branin are searching for the volcryn, an enigmatic alien species with advanced interstellar travel technology. The main protagonist is Melantha Jhirl, a dark-skinned genetically engineered human who stands a head taller than the other scholars. Due to limited funds, d'Branin has hired the services of the Nightflyer, a modified trader owned by captain Royd Eris. The enigmatic Royd keeps to his own sphere of the ship, preferring to correspond with the passengers via hologram. Royd secretly spies on the passengers using computer monitors.

Over the next five weeks, the passengers speculate about the secretive nature of their mysterious captain. The team's telepath Thale Lasamer senses there is something dangerous aboard the Nightflyer. The team's psipsych Agatha Marij-Black drugs Thale with the drug psionine-4 to keep him calm. Things start to take a turn for the worse after the xenotech Alys Northwind accidentally cuts her finger with a kitchen knife. As tensions among the passengers escalate due to the ship's cramped and claustrophobic quarters, captain Royd is compelled to answer questions about his background to quell suspicions. He explains that he is the cross-sex clone of his late trader mother, and avoids interacting with people in the flesh because, having lived his entire life in zero gravity, he is malformed and has a dangerously weak immune system.

Distrusting Royd, Agatha gives Thale the psy-boosting drug esperon and tells him to read Royd's mind. However, Thale's head spontaneously explodes before he communicates anything. Agatha goes into shock and is sedated. Despite growing unrest among the crew, d'Branin still proceeds with the voyage due to his determination to find the volcryn. Later that night, the cyberneticist Lommie Thorne and Alys attempt to hack into the ship's computer systems in an attempt to investigate captain Royd. The airlock opens, killing the two scholars and causing significant damage to the Nightflyer.

Despite their mutual distrust, the remaining scholars agree to exit the ship to help Royd make repairs to the ship's damaged structure. The xenobiologist Rojan Christopher, suspicious of Royd, sneaks back on board and attempts to cut his way into Royd's quarters with a portable cutting laser, but the laser is turned on him by an unseen force and cuts through his neck. Over Royd's protests, the linguists Dannel and Lindran return to the ship to investigate Christopher's screams. The unseen force kills them and reanimates their bodies. Royd informs d'Branin and Melantha that the ship is inhabited by the preserved spirit of his late mother. While d'Branin and Agatha travel in a gravity sled to seek the volcryn, Melantha and Royd attempt to retake the ship from Royd's Mother. d'Branin discovers that the volcryn are giant space-faring creatures that live in space.

Melantha manages to destroy the possessed corpses of Dannel and Lindran in the ship's mass conversion unit. Royd manages to subdue his telepathic mother by restoring the ship's gravity, but is killed in the process. He becomes a ghost and wrests control of the ship from his mother. Due to the danger of the ghostly entities aboard the ship, Melantha decides to spend her remaining days aboard the Nightflyer, though rebuffing Royd's pleas to repair the ship. Before she dies, she intends to destroy the central crystal and clear the ship's computers before setting a course to the closest inhabited world. Melantha vows not to leave Royd alone with his dead mother.

== Characters ==
- Melantha Jhirl, a genetically engineered human woman who is a head taller and stronger than her fellow scholars. She was born on the planet Prometheus to two genetic wizards but defected to Avalon.
- Karoly d'Branin, administrator, generalist, and mission leader. He is obsessed with contacting the volcryn.
- Lommie Thorne, a female cyberneticist in a relationship with Melantha.
- Rojan Christopheris, xenobiologist. Christopheris is an argumentative and cynical man who does not get along with the other scholars.
- Dannel, a male linguist who is in a romantic relationship with Lindran.
- Lindran, a female linguist and colleague of Dannel. She is in an outwardly devoted relationship with Dannel, but belittles him about his professional competence behind closed doors.
- Agatha Marij-Black, a female psipsych. Agatha is a hypochrondriac who is prone to depression.
- Alys Northwind, a female xenotech who wears a jumpsuit and never washes.
- Thale Lasamer, a male telepath and the youngest member of the expedition. Thale is a frail, nervous and temperament man, who is afraid of everyone around him but is also prone to fits of arrogance.
- Royd Eris, the enigmatic captain of the Nightflyer, he prefers to interact with the passengers via hologram.
- Royd Eris, is a 68-year old male cross-sex clone who has lived his entire life in zero-gravity space. His body is frail and he lacks an effective immune system.
- Mother, a ghost that haunts the Nightflyer. She was a telekinetic who grew up in poverty in the trash world of Vess. As a child, she was tortured for being a telepath and developed a hatred for her fellow humans. She became a successful free trader but isolated herself from other humans. She is effectively the mother of Royd Eris. Her ghost inhabits a crystal that controls the ship's computer systems.

== Publication history ==
Originally written in 1980, the 23,000-word novella was published by Analog Science Fiction and Fact. In 1981, at the request of his editor at the time, James Frenkel, Martin expanded the story into a 30,000-word piece, which was published by Dell Publishing together with Vernor Vinge's True Names as part of their Binary Star series. In the extended version, Martin supplied additional backstory on the various characters, and named several secondary characters who were not named in the original version.

Nightflyers is set in the same fictional "Thousand Worlds" universe as several of Martin's other works, including Dying of the Light, Sandkings, A Song for Lya, "The Way of Cross and Dragon" and the stories collected in Tuf Voyaging.

In 1981, Nightflyers won the Locus Award for best novella and the Analog Readers Poll for best novella/novelette, and was nominated for the Hugo Award for Best Novella. The novella was also the recipient of the 1983 Seiun Award in Japan for foreign short fiction.

== Collection ==
The collection is the fifth by Martin and was first published in December 1985. It contains the following stories and novellas:

- Nightflyers
- "Override"
- "Weekend in a War Zone"
- "And Seven Times Never Kill Man"
- "Nor the Many-Colored Fires of a Star Ring"
- A Song for Lya

== Adaptations ==
=== Film ===
The novel was adapted into a 1987 film by writer/producer Robert Jaffe. The film is about a group of scientists who begin a space voyage to find a mysterious alien creature, and in the process are victimized by the ship's malevolent computer. It was directed by Robert Collector, using the pseudonym "T. C. Blake" as he left before post-production was completed, and stars Catherine Mary Stewart, and Michael Praed. According to Martin, writer/producer Robert Jaffe probably adapted his script from the shorter novella version, since all of the secondary characters had different names than the ones he chose in the expanded version. The film grossed $1,149,470.

=== Television ===
In 2017, a pilot for a possible TV series based on Nightflyers was being developed by Syfy. The series was based on the 1987 film, with Jaffe serving as one of the producers. The script for the pilot was written by Jeff Buhler. Martin was not involved in the production or writing for the new series, since his contract with HBO contains an exclusivity clause.

Jodie Turner-Smith was cast as Melantha Jhirl. Martin expressed his enthusiasm on his journal, and pointed out that her casting more accurately represents the novella's character than the film, which cast a white actress. Netflix co-produced the show and holds first-run rights outside of the United States.

The series premiered on Syfy on December 2, 2018 and was filmed in Ireland. Syfy announced the series was cancelled after a single season in February 2019.
