= A Song for Lya (novella) =

Science fiction novella

A Song For Lya
- Collection containing title story (Avon Books)
- Author: George R.R. Martin
- Language: English
- Genre: Science fiction
- Published in: Analog Science Fiction and Fact
- Publication date: 1974
- Publication place: USA
- Media type: Magazine

"A Song For Lya" is a science fiction novella by American writer George R.R. Martin. It was published in Analog Science Fiction and Fact magazine in 1974 and won the Hugo Award for Best Novella in 1975. It was also nominated for the 1975 Nebula Award for Best Novella and Jupiter Award for Best Novella, and took second place in the Locus Poll.

== Plot ==
The story deals with two telepaths named Robb and Lyanna ("Lya" for short), who visit the planet Shkea by an invitation of the planetary administrator, who is disconcerted by the culture of the native alien population, the Shkeen, and how it affects humans. The Shkeen are an ancient culture, but their progress has stalled at a Stone Age level for thousands of years. Their religion is centered on a jelly-like parasite called the Greeshka. At middle age, they allow themselves to be infected by it, and ten years later visit a cave where there is a large mass of Greeshka and allow themselves to be consumed by it. The administrator is concerned because a growing quantity of humans have joined that religion, including his predecessor.

Besides working as a team, Robb and Lya are a couple, and they pride themselves that their telepathy allows them a closer bond and much better understanding of one another than the one regular humans have, but at the same time Lya has feelings of existential dread, and a feeling of isolation that not even their powers can surpass.

Robb and Lya attend a ceremony for Shkeen that are about to get infected with Greeshka and the following day they explore the city to find some who are already infected. They find some, both Shkeen and human, and Lya reads in their minds how lonely they were before converting, and how the Greeshka has removed the loneliness. That night, Robb and Lyanna have an emotional discussion and Lyanna disappears. Robb and a local team visit one of the caves where the Shkeen are consumed by the Greeshka, and when he tries to read the emotions on a Shkeen in the middle of the process, he receives a feeling of love that overwhelms him and is unable to resist it, until he loses consciousness.

When he wakes up, one of the locals tells him that after he tried to read the people in the cave, he lost control and tried to walk into the Greeshka, and the rest of them had to render him unconscious to get him out. Later, Lya communicates with him in his sleep, telling him that she went to a cave and allowed herself to be consumed by the Greeshka, which she says is a link to an afterlife of sorts where the minds of every person who has been absorbed by it live and share love without any loneliness. She pleads to him to join her, but he rejects it.

At the end, afraid that if he stays longer in Shkea he will succumb to the attraction of the Greeshka, Robb decides to return to his homeworld, hoping to find a means of transcendence and to overcome loneliness that is not Shkeen, but purely human.

In his essay "The Light of Distant Stars", Martin said it was inspired by the first serious romance he was involved in.

== Connections to other works ==
"A Song for Lya" is set in the same fictional "Thousand Worlds" universe as several of Martin's other works, including Dying of the Light, "Sandkings", Nightflyers, "The Way of Cross and Dragon" and the stories collected in Tuf Voyaging.

In his later book series A Song of Ice and Fire, the names Robb and Lyanna are used for two members of House Stark, Robb Stark being the son of Eddard Stark and Lyanna Stark being Eddard's younger sister, as well for the character of the young Lyanna Mormont. Additionally, the afterlife and collective consciousness within the Greeshka in "A Song for Lya" parallels the afterlife and collective consciousness within the Weirwood trees described by the Children of the Forest in A Song of Ice and Fire.

== See also ==
- The 1975 Annual World's Best SF
