= Sandkings (novelette) =

1979 novelette by George R. R. Martin

- Ebook cover
- Author: George R. R. Martin
- Language: English
- Genre: Science fiction
- Published: 1979 by Omni
- Publication place: United States
- Media type: Print
- Pages: 23
- OCLC: 12192185
- Dewey Decimal: 813.54
- LC Class: PS3563.A7239

"Sandkings" is a science fiction horror novelette by American writer George R. R. Martin, first published in the August 1979 issue of Omni. In 1980, it won the Hugo Award for Best Novelette, the Nebula Award for Best Novelette and the Locus Award for best novelette, and was nominated for the Balrog Award in short fiction. It is the only one of Martin's stories to date to have won both the Hugo and the Nebula. It was included in the short story collection of the same name, published by Timescape Books in December 1981.

Martin was inspired by a college friend at Northwestern University who had a piranha tank and would sometimes throw goldfish into it between horror film screenings. He had planned for it to be part of a trilogy, with Wo & Shade running businesses on several worlds, but the concept fell through.

"Sandkings" is set in the same fictional "Thousand Worlds" universe as several of Martin's other works, including Dying of the Light, Nightflyers, A Song for Lya, "The Way of Cross and Dragon" and the stories collected in Tuf Voyaging.

== Plot summary ==
Simon Kress, a wealthy playboy on the planet Baldur, loves to collect dangerous, exotic animals. When most of his pets die after being left alone during a long business trip, he ventures into the city to find replacements. He is unsatisfied by the offerings in the stores he has patronized in the past, but eventually he comes across a mysterious new establishment called Wo & Shade.

Inside, he meets one of the owners, Jala Wo. She shows him a terrarium filled with four colonies of creatures called sandkings. Each colony consists of a large female called the maw, and numerous insect-like mobiles. The maw is immobile, but controls the mobiles through telepathy. The mobiles hunt, forage, and build, and bring food back to the maw, which digests it and passes nutrients on to the mobiles. Each colony has constructed a castle out of sand around the maw, and the creatures fight coordinated wars and battles with one another. Wo also shows Kress how she has beamed a hologram of herself into the tank, and how the sandkings have decorated their castles with her likeness. Kress is mildly intrigued, but disappointed at the small size of the creatures. Wo assures him that they will grow to fill whatever environment they are kept in. Kress then agrees to purchase them. Wo assures him that they are easy to care for, and will eat anything.

Kress observes the installation of his sandkings and watches his four colonies (colored white, black, red, and orange) begin to build their castles. There is little intrigue or fighting, however, so a bored Kress begins to starve them. After that, they consistently war over the food he does provide. He also beams a hologram of his face, and they begin to decorate their castles appropriately.

After a time, Kress invites his friends, including Wo, to view a war fought by his new pets. The guests are suitably impressed, but Jala Wo worries that he is not feeding the sandkings adequately. She assures him that if they are kept comfortable, they will engage in intrigue and wars that are endlessly more entertaining than if they are made to squabble over food. Kress dismisses her complaints and resolves not to invite her any more. Cath m'Lane, a former lover, leaves in disgust.

Kress throws a series of parties and takes bets on the outcome of the sandking battles. At one, a guest brings a dangerous alien creature and suggests pitting it against the sandkings. The sandkings quickly dispatch it. This begins a series of matches: the sandkings emerge victorious in all of them.

Eventually, Kress learns that Cath has reported the sandkings to the animal control authorities. After bribing the authorities, he then films himself feeding a puppy to the sandkings and sends the footage to her. As he goes to bed, he notices his face on the castles has become twisted and sinister. Outraged, he pokes a sword into the white maw, injuring it. His intention of punishing the other maws is cut short when a sandking mobile escapes the tank. Horrified, he crushes it beneath his heel and re-seals the tank, vowing never to open it again. He then goes to bed.

Cath arrives the next day with a sledgehammer, and tries to smash the sandkings' terrarium. Trying frantically to stop her, Kress stabs her with a sword. In dying, she finally breaks the plastic, releasing the sandkings. Kress flees the house in a panic. By the time he returns, the sandkings have taken over: the black and red have built castles in the garden, while the whites have taken over the basement. He is unable to find the oranges. Freed from their container, the sandkings grow larger. After getting rid of Cath's vehicle and recovering the footage, Kress chops up Cath's body into digestible pieces to appease the sandkings. Over time, a panicked Kress empties his pantry while trying to get rid of the sandkings. Kress tries to exterminate them himself, then hires black market assassins to assist him, but he is only able to destroy the blacks and the reds, and the whites trap him in the house. He then invites several guests and locks them in the basement, where the sandkings devour them.

The next morning, the mobiles are comatose. Kress finally decides to contact Wo, who explains that as the sandkings grow larger, the maw becomes more intelligent, and eventually reaches sentience. At that point the mobiles mature and take on whatever form the maw believes is most suitable, but is always equipped with opposable thumbs and the ability to manipulate technology. She reveals that her partner, Shade, is a mature sandking himself. Because of Kress's mistreatment, however, the white maw is unstable and dangerous. Wo tells Kress to flee, and assures him that she will take care of the sandkings.

Kress runs into the wilderness around his estate in a blind panic, trying to follow Wo's directions for a pickup. While walking in the desert, he decides to hire an assassin to kill Wo and Shade after the problem is resolved, but as he thinks about this, he realizes that either he has become lost in the desert or that Wo and Shade were eaten by the sandkings. After traveling all day without food or drink, he finally comes across a house, with children playing outside. Thinking he has found salvation, he calls out to them. As he comes closer, however, he realizes that he has reached the castle of the mature orange sandkings. As they surround him and drag him to the waiting mouth of the maw, he screams; all of them have his face.

== Adaptations ==
In 1987, "Sandkings" was adapted as the seventh of the DC Science Fiction Graphic Novel series, by writer Doug Moench and artists Pat Broderick and Neal McPheeters.

In 1995, "Sandkings" was adapted into a television film that served as the first episode of The Outer Limits relaunch. The script was adapted by Melinda M. Snodgrass, Martin's co-editor for the Wild Cards series.

In 2021, Netflix was announced to be planning a film based on Sandkings, with Gore Verbinski directing and Dennis Kelly adapting the book.
