= Herb Jaffe =

American film producer (1921–1991)

- Born: May 20, 1921; Brooklyn, New York, U.S.
- Died: December 7, 1991 (aged 70); Beverly Hills, California, U.S.
- Occupations: Agent, studio executive, film producer
- Years active: c. 1950–1988
- Children: Steven-Charles Jaffe; Robert Jaffe

Herb Jaffe (May 20, 1921 – December 7, 1991) was an independent film producer in the United States. He came to producing after two earlier careers in the industry: as a literary agent whose clients included Paddy Chayefsky, Reginald Rose, Joseph Heller and Philip Roth, and as a senior executive at United Artists, where he rose to head of worldwide production.

Jaffe left United Artists in the early 1970s to produce independently. His first feature in that capacity was John Milius's The Wind and the Lion (1975), and he went on to make some sixteen films, among them Demon Seed (1977), Who'll Stop the Rain (1978), Time After Time (1979) and Fright Night (1985). In the 1980s he headed the production company The Vista Organization.

== Career ==
=== Early career ===
Jaffe was born in Brooklyn, New York, and began his career as a press agent before joining the newly formed television division of the talent agency MCA, where he spent about six years. As a literary agent, he represented writers including Reginald Rose, Joseph Heller, Philip Roth and Paddy Chayefsky.

Jaffe sold the agency in 1965 to join United Artists, initially as a vice-president for production. He became head of the studio's West Coast production and eventually of its worldwide production. He was at United Artists during the period in which it released Midnight Cowboy (1969) and Last Tango in Paris (1972).

=== Independent producer ===
Having become an independent producer in 1973, he produced The Wind and the Lion (1975), starring Sean Connery and directed by John Milius. His later credits as producer included Demon Seed (1977), with Julie Christie, Who'll Stop the Rain (1978), with Nick Nolte, Time After Time (1979), Jinxed! (1982), with Bette Midler, The Lords of Discipline (1983), and Fright Night (1985) and its sequel Fright Night Part 2 (1988), the latter starring Julie Carmen. He was executive producer on four further films, among them Those Lips, Those Eyes (1980) and Motel Hell (1980).

=== The Vista Organization ===
In the 1980s, he was head of The Vista Organization (a.k.a. Vista Films). During this time, he also set up Vista Films' home video branches, as well as distribution arm, New Century/Vista Film Co., a joint venture with New Century Entertainment.

== Personal life and death ==
Two of Jaffe's sons worked in the film industry. Steven-Charles Jaffe is a producer whose early credits include Demon Seed and Time After Time; Robert Jaffe is a writer, producer and actor who wrote Demon Seed and Motel Hell and co-wrote Nightflyers.

Jaffe died of cancer at the age of 70 at his home in Beverly Hills, California.

== Filmography ==
- The Wind and the Lion (1975) (producer)
- Demon Seed (1977) (producer)
- Who'll Stop the Rain (1978) (producer)
- Time After Time (1979) (producer)
- Motel Hell (1980) (executive producer)
- Those Lips, Those Eyes (1980) (executive producer)
- Jinxed! (1982) (producer)
- The Lords of Discipline (1983) (producer)
- Little Treasure (1985) (producer)
- Fright Night (1985) (producer)
- Three for the Road (1987) (producer)
- Maid to Order (1987) (producer)
- Dudes (1987) (producer)
- Nightflyers (1987) (executive producer)
- Remote Control (1988) (executive producer)
- Fright Night Part 2 (1988) (producer)
