= Steven-Charles Jaffe =

American film director

- Born: Steven-Charles Jaffe; 1951 (age 74–75)
- Other name: Steven C. Jaffe
- Occupations: Producer, writer, director
- Years active: 1975–present
- Organization: Academy of Motion Picture Arts and Sciences
- Known for: Near Dark; Ghost; Star Trek VI: The Undiscovered Country; Strange Days
- Father: Herb Jaffe
- Relatives: Robert Jaffe (brother)

Steven-Charles Jaffe (born 1951) is an American film producer, director, and screenwriter known for his work on such films as Motel Hell (1980), Near Dark (1987), Strange Days (1995), and the Best Picture-nominated romantic fantasy film Ghost. He is a long-time friend and collaborator of directors Nicholas Meyer and Kathryn Bigelow, and has worked with them on films like Time After Time (1979), Star Trek VI: The Undiscovered Country (1991), and K-19: The Widowmaker (2002). He is a member of the Academy of Motion Picture Arts and Sciences.

== Life and career ==
Jaffe was born and raised in New York state, the son of Herb Jaffe, a successful literary agent. At an early age, he wanted to be a novelist, and later an architect. His father entered the film industry while Jaffe was in high school, and became an executive at United Artists after selling his agency to ICM Partners.

While attending the University of Southern California to study linguistics, Jaffe developed an interest foreign films from directors like François Truffaut, Akira Kurosawa, and Michelangelo Antonioni. His first job in the industry came when he was involved in the making of a behind-the-scenes documentary of the1972 drama film Fat City through producer Ray Stark, who had established a scholarship at USC in his son's name. Stark proposed a promotional film that would intersperse behind-the-scenes footage with footage of real boxers on whom the film was based. Jaffe worked closely with director John Huston during production.

On the verge of being drafted with only one semester of school left, Jaffe flew to Amsterdam where he stayed for a year. While there, he served as an assistant director on the film Lifespan and as a personal assistant to its director Alexander Whitelaw. His father, upon leaving his position at United Artists, convinced Jaffe to join him in Spain for the film The Wind and the Lion after an initial refusal to avoid accusation of nepotism.

Jaffe was an associate producer on the 1977 horror film Demon Seed. In 1980, he co-wrote and co-produced Motel Hell with Robert Jaffe.

Jaffe formed long-term collaborative partnerships with directors Nicholas Meyer and Kathryn Bigelow, serving as a second unit director and producer on Time After Time, Star Trek VI: The Undiscovered Country, and Strange Days. He was an executive producer on the 1990 film Ghost, which won the Academy Award for Best Original Screenplay and was nominated for Best Picture.

In 2008, he formed the independent production company Helix Films with producers Gaukhar Noortas and Kevin Foo. He wrote, produced, and directed Gahan Wilson: Born Dead, Still Weird, a documentary based on the life of the eponymous cartoonist.

== Filmography ==
Year	Title	Producer	Director	Writer
1980	Motel Hell	Yes		Yes
1980	Those Lips, Those Eyes	Yes		
1983	Scarab		Yes	Yes
1987	Near Dark	Yes		
1989	The Fly II	Yes		
1991	Company Business	Yes		
1991	Star Trek VI: The Undiscovered Country	Yes		
1995	Strange Days	Yes		
2008	It Was a Dark and Silly Night	Yes	Yes	
2013	Gahan Wilson: Born Dead, Still Weird	Yes	Yes	Yes

Executive producer

- Remo Williams: The Adventure Begins (1985)
- Plain Clothes (1988)
- Ghost (1990)
- The Informant (1997)
- The Weight of Water (2000)

Second unit director

- Time After Time (1979)
- The Day After (1983)
- Flesh and Blood (1985)
- Ghost (1990)
- Company Business (1991)
- Star Trek VI: The Undiscovered Country (1991)
- Strange Days (1995)

Associate producer

- Demon Seed (1977)
- Time After Time (1979)

Other credits

Year	Title	Role
1975	The Wind and the Lion	Assistant to producer
1978	Who'll Stop the Rain	Location manager
2002	K-19: The Widowmaker	Co-producer
