= Jinxed! (1982 film) =

1982 film by Don Siegel

Jinxed
- Theatrical release poster
- Directed by: Don Siegel
- Screenplay by: Frank D. Gilroy; David Newman
- Story by: Frank D. Gilroy
- Produced by: Herb Jaffe
- Starring: Bette Midler; Ken Wahl; Rip Torn
- Cinematography: Vilmos Zsigmond
- Edited by: Douglas Stewart
- Music by: Bruce Roberts; Miles Goodman
- Production companies: Herb Jaffe Productions; United Artists
- Distributed by: Metro-Goldwyn-Mayer
- Release date: October 22, 1982
- Running time: 103 minutes
- Country: United States
- Language: English
- Budget: $13.4 million
- Box office: $2,869,638

Jinxed! (also branded as Jinxed on promotional media) is a 1982 American comedy film starring Bette Midler, Rip Torn and Ken Wahl. The film was the last to be directed by Don Siegel, who suffered a heart attack during production. Siegel hired Sam Peckinpah, who had worked for him in the past, to shoot second-unit work, for which Peckinpah was uncredited.

== Plot ==
Bonita Friml is a Las Vegas lounge singer whose husband Harold Benson is a cigar-smoking recreational gambler with a long winning streak. It seems that he cannot lose to one blackjack dealer in particular, a man named Willie Brodax. When the casino notices Willie's losing streak, they fire him, figuring that he must be jinxed. Willie then lands another blackjack-dealing job in Reno, Nevada and Harold follows him there, forcing Bonita to abandon her lucrative singing gig to accompany him.

When Willie sees that Harold is now in Reno, Willie reports Harold to security, but they find no evidence of cheating. Milt Hawkins, who works with Willie at the casino, suggests that Willie "get a piece of" Harold the way that Harold "got a piece of" him. Willie follows Harold and eventually finds Harold's mobile home. Willie then encounters Bonita, and the two fall in love. She tells Willie that she is tired of living with her domineering husband and wants to have Harold murdered. She tries to convince Willie to help with the murder plot, but he is hesitant. When she insists, he agrees to help her, but on one condition: if he can break the jinx, the murder plans will be canceled.

When the fateful day arrives, Harold shows up to play blackjack against Willie as usual. Harold's winning streak continues, but just when he has wagered all of his money on one final hand, a woman sitting next to him becomes annoyed by the cigar that he has been smoking for good luck. She yanks the cigar away from him and extinguishes it. When he hits on his blackjack hand, he makes 20, but a surprisingly calm Willie manages to get 21, thus finally beating Harold. Willie has broken the jinx, and Harold is now flat broke. But when Willie phones Bonita to call off the murder plot, she doesn't answer the phone.

When Harold arrives home, he pretends that he had won big so that Bonita will not know that they are broke. When Harold is in the shower, he is so distraught that he commits suicide by sticking his finger in an open light-bulb socket. Willie arrives, sees Bonita hovering over the dead body, and assumes that she had killed her husband. She assures Willie that it was a suicide, which makes him regret having beaten Harold. When Bonita hears this and learns that Harold had lost everything, she begins to panic. Willie reminds her of the life insurance money that she is sure to receive, but she points out that the insurance policy had a suicide clause that prevents her from collecting. She and Willie decide to make Harold's death look like an accident.

Willie drives off towing Bonita's trailer behind him and, while stopped in a remote location, places Harold's corpse behind the wheel of the truck. Willie rolls the truck and trailer into a ravine, then heads back into town. When police discover the crashed vehicle, they conclude that Harold must have died in an accident, meaning that Bonita can now receive the insurance money. But when she goes to file the claim, she learns that Harold had allowed the policy to lapse, thus dashing any hope that she may receive benefits. However, Harold did leave her a letter that sends her on a scavenger hunt for clues that will instruct her how to get the money that she will need. The clues spell "J-O-N-A-H", as in Jonah, the Biblical prophet who was infamously jinxed in the Old Testament.

Knowing what this means, Bonita heads to the casino, sits down at Willie's table, and begins to play blackjack. During her gameplay, she smokes the same kind of cigar that Harold always smoked for good luck. She embarks on a winning streak of her own, upsetting Willie and his supervisors, who fear that his jinx has returned. After he is fired from this job, he drives away in his car, only to find Bonita hiding in the back seat waiting for him. She wants him to join her in a new scheme in which he will go from casino to casino working as a dealer, and they will split the money that they will make when she wins the casinos' money by playing against him.

== Cast ==
- Bette Midler as Bonita Friml
- Ken Wahl as Willie Brodax
- Rip Torn as Harold Benson
- Val Avery as Milt Hawkins
- Jack Elam as Otto
- Benson Fong as Dr. Wing
- Jacqueline Scott as Woman Bettor
- F. William Parker as Art
- Ian Wolfe as Morley
- George Dickerson as Tahoe Casino Manager
- Kathryn Kates as Miss Nina
- Barry Michlin as Talent Booker (Max)
- Read Morgan as Reno Player
- Jim Nolan as Father
- Kathleen O'Malley as Mother
- Woodrow Parfrey as Insurance Agent
- Tom Pletts as Tahoe First Monitor
- Archie Lang as Tahoe Second Monitor
- Joan Freeman as Woman Agent
- Don Siegel as Adult Bookstore Owner

== Production ==
The film is based on the 1980 novel The Edge by Frank D. Gilroy, who sold the film rights to the Ladd Company at Warner Bros. Ladd then sold the project to Herb Jaffe of United Artists for $300,000 and Jaffe hired David Newman to rewrite the script. A United Artists production executive suggested Bette Midler for the lead, and she requested that Don Siegel direct. The script was rewritten by Jerry Blatt, Carol Rydall, Midler and Siegel. During development it was also known as The Jackpot and Hot Streak. Gilroy requested that his name be removed from the screen credits and was credited as Burt Blessing.

Filming began on May 5, 1981 and took place at Harrah's Lake Tahoe, Lake Tahoe, MGM Grand Reno and MGM's studios.

Siegel had been a mentor of director Sam Peckinpah, who was having difficulty finding directing jobs. Siegel offered Peckinpah a chance to return to filmmaking with 12 days of second-unit directing work on Jinxed!. After Siegel suffered a heart attack, Peckinpah directed some scenes, but without a screen credit. However, Peckinpah's work allowed him to be hired to direct The Osterman Weekend (1983), his final film before his death in 1984.

Midler and Ken Wahl reportedly fought throughout filming, making no secret of their open hostility toward each other. Wahl described to the press how much he disliked kissing Midler. Years later, Midler said that Siegel was also hostile to her. In turn, Siegel said that the experience of working with Midler was unpleasant. When asked by United Artists executive Steven Bach why he did not quit the project, Siegel replied: "Because then I wouldn't get my fee. Why not fire me?"

Lalo Schifrin composed and recorded a score for Jinxed! that would have been his sixth score for Siegel, but it was rejected by the studio despite Siegel's objections.

== Reception ==
Released to theaters on October 22, 1982, the film was a box-office failure.

Critic Roger Ebert awarded the film one and a half stars of a possible four. He wrote: "This is a messed-up movie that throws away what few opportunities it has to entertain us, and gets totally lost in a plot that starts as comedy and moves through farce on its way to paralysis." Ebert added that it was implausible to believe that Midler's character was an unsuccessful performer, but that her musical numbers still supplied most of the film's few highlights.

== DVD release ==
The 2004 DVD release includes the original theatrical trailer, which includes a fraction of a deleted scene: Midler, wearing her mourning gown, quickly tries to enter the car while it is already undergoing an automated car wash.
