= Nightflyers (TV series) =

American horror science fiction TV series

- Promotional poster
- Genre: Science fiction; Horror; Psychological thriller
- Based on: Nightflyers by George R. R. Martin
- Starring: Eoin Macken; David Ajala; Jodie Turner-Smith; Angus Sampson; Sam Strike; Maya Eshet; Brían F. O'Byrne; Gretchen Mol
- Composer: Will Bates
- Country of origin: United States
- Original language: English
- No. of seasons: 1
- No. of episodes: 10

Production
- Executive producers: Daniel Cerone; George R. R. Martin; Jeff Buhler; Gene Klein; David Bartis; Brian Nelson; Doug Liman; Alison Rosenzweig; Michael Gaeta; Lloyd Ivan Miller; Alice P. Neuhauser
- Producers: Robert Jaffe; Andrew McCarthy
- Production location: Ireland
- Editor: Toby Yates
- Running time: 42–44 minutes
- Production companies: Fevre River Jacket Co.; Gaeta/Rosenzweig; Hypnotic; Universal Cable Productions

Original release
- Network: Syfy
- Release: December 2 – December 13, 2018

Nightflyers is an American horror science fiction television series that premiered on Syfy in the United States on December 2, 2018, and on Netflix, internationally on February 1, 2019. The series is based on the novella and series of short stories of the same name by George R. R. Martin. The first season consisted of ten episodes, which concluded on December 13, 2018. Syfy canceled the series in February 2019.

== Premise ==
In 2093, a team of scientists embarked on a journey into space aboard an advanced ship called the Nightflyer. Their mission is to make first contact with alien life-forms. When terrifyingly violent events begin to occur aboard, the team begins to question each other but comes to the realization that there must be something else on board the Nightflyer with them. It is up to the crew to save the ship themselves and complete their mission.

== Cast ==
=== Main ===
- Eoin Macken as Karl d’Branin, an astrophysicist and leader of the Nightflyer expedition
- David Ajala as Roy Eris, the reclusive captain of the Nightflyer
- Jodie Turner-Smith as Melantha Jhirl
- Angus Sampson as Rowan, a xenobiologist
- Sam Strike as Thale, an L-1 telepath
- Maya Eshet as Lommie Thorne, a cyberneticist who communicates with the Nightflyer's computers via a neuro-port surgically implanted in her arm
- Brían F. O'Byrne as Auggie, chief engineer of the Nightflyer
- Gretchen Mol as Agatha Matheson, a psychiatrist who specializes in working with telepaths

=== Recurring ===
- Phillip Rhys as Murphy
- Gwynne McElveen as Dr. Tobis
- Zoë Tapper as Joy d'Branin
- Miranda Raison as Tessia
- Bronte Carmichael as Skye d'Branin
- Youssef Kerkour as Hartley Suczek
- Joplin Sibtain as Lommie's father
- Josette Simon as Cynthia
- Brielle Olaleye as young Cynthia
- Daniel Adegboyega as Henry Eris
- Olwen Fouéré as Connie
- Ned Dennehy as Captain Judson

== Production ==
=== Development ===
In 2016, Syfy began developing a series based on Martin's novella after its acquisition. The series is also based on the film adaptation from 1987. George R. R. Martin was not directly involved with the series due to his exclusive contract with HBO, but was credited as an executive producer.

=== Filming ===
The series started its production in early 2018 on location in Limerick, Ireland, and also at the Limerick-based Troy Studios, with Daniel Cerone serving as the showrunner. Cerone also serves as a series executive producer, along with Gene Klein, David Bartis, and Doug Liman of Hypnotic; Alison Rosenzweig and Michael Gaeta of Gaeta Rosenzweig Films; and Lloyd Ivan Miller and Alice P. Neuhauser of Lloyd Ivan Miller Productions.

For the visual effects, Spin VFX is the main vendor, with Territory Studio supplying user interfaces. Switch Visual Effects also provides additional support. The visual effects have to work seamlessly with the large practical set built for the ship.

== Episodes ==
No.	Title	Directed by	Teleplay by	Original release date	U.S. viewers (millions)
1	"All That We Left Behind"	Mike Cahill	Jeff Buhler	December 2, 2018	0.623
With the Earth ravaged by disease and pollution, the astrophysicist Karl d'Branin leads a mission to make contact with an advanced alien species called the volcryn. The Nightflyer is an advanced explorer ship commanded by the reclusive captain Roy Eris, the CEO of ErisCorp who communicates with the other crew and passengers by hologram. Other crew members include Melantha Jhirl, the xenobiologist Rowan, the psychiatrist Agatha Matherson, and the telepath Thale. Thale is regarded as dangerous by the other expedition members except Agatha and is kept in a sealed chamber. While breaking from Earth's orbit, the ship's thrusters malfunction. Other unfortunate incidents follow including Karl experiencing visions of his late daughter Skye and Melantha almost drowning in a tank. As the expedition members start to blame Thale, he escapes from his cell. Chief Engineer Murphy is badly burned while trying to apprehend Thale in the fuel chamber.
2	"Torches and Pitchforks"	Andrew McCarthy	Daniel Cerone	December 3, 2018	0.414
While Murphy has his wounds treated, the crew of the Nightflyer launch a manhunt for Thale. Lommie attempts to hack into the ship’s computer system while Melantha grows suspicious of Roy’s surveillance. After reading Murphy's memories, Karl and Agatha discover that Thale caused Murphy's injuries. Since Karl believes that Thale is essential to their mission, Roy covers up Thale’s actions by blaming an electrical accident for Murphy's injuries and wiping Murphy’s memories of the incident. Thale befriends a lady in the orchard dome and surrenders in return for not being subject to drugs. Karl is also haunted by Skye's apparent ghost. After a possessed robotic spider wounds Hartley and kills his team, Roy tells Karl that a mysterious force is trying to sabotage the mission. He warns the entity that it has gone too far.
3	"The Abyss Stares Back"	Nick Murphy	Lindsay Sturman	December 4, 2018	0.390
With the approval of Agatha, Rowan gets permission to enlist Thale in his research, which involves an experiment with a rabbit. The rabbit dies and Agatha discovers it was infected with a tape worm. Melantha manages to reactivate the Nightflyer's fourth thruster but is exposed to radioactive energy. While recovering under the care of Lommie, Melantha tells her lover that the real Roy Eris saved her. Meanwhile, Hartley is tormented by a demonic force. He attempts to force the bridge crew to return to Europa but Roy kills him by breaking his neck. Rowan joins forces with Karl to infiltrate Roy’s headquarters, believing that the elusive captain is hiding something from them. However, Karl is tormented by a spirit. Roy reveals that the Nightflyer is haunted by the ghost of his late mother, who uploaded her consciousness into the ship.
4	"White Rabbit"	Maggie Kiley	Brian Nelson	December 5, 2018	0.319
Following the revelations, Karl, Roy, and Rowan have to contend with the ghost of Roy’s mother. Despite the regular hauntings, Roy and Karl are determined to continue with their expedition to establish contact with the volcryn. Through his telepathic abilities, Thale senses a crew member being frozen to death in the cargo hold by Roy’s mother. Roy and Agatha find the body. Roy’s mother wants the expedition to remove a volcryn probe, which contains alien flesh. Working with Lommie, Karl and Rowan hack into the alien probe. Following an ordeal, Lommie reveals that the volcryn have sent back the probe in order to send a message to them.
5	"Greywing"	M. J. Bassett	Story by : Daniel Cerone; Teleplay by : Terry Matalas & Christopher Monfette	December 6, 2018	0.470
To guarantee the success of the mission, Roy enlists Lommie in penetrating the Nightflyer's computer system. With the help of Thale, Lommie enters a cyber reality version of Greywing Manor where she encounters a younger and older version of Roy’s mother Cynthia. Following a struggle, Lommie manages to lock the older version of Cynthia in a room within this virtual space and seal it with a firewall. Thale's actions earn him Agatha's support. Agatha and Karl develop romantic feelings for each other while Rowan speculates that the volcryn sent back the probe to listen to them. There is a falling out between Lommie and Melantha after Lommie learns that Melantha was aware that Roy was monitoring their movements.
6	"The Sacred Gift"	Andrew McCarthy	Jeff Buhler	December 9, 2018	0.424
As the Nightflyer continues its voyage, Thale experiences a vision of several women. The Nightflyer encounters a stricken ErisCorp ship called the Eagle 16, which has been floating in deep space. Under orders from Roy to recover the ship's crystal in order to imprison his mother Cynthia's ghost, Karl, Melantha, Lommie, Auggie, and Rowan board the Eagle 16. They discover that the ship's female passengers, led by the scientist Connie, have established a self-sustainable society based on eating the flesh of clones created from the sperm of the male crew. Connie and her followers capture the crew of the Nightflyer, intending to recruit Melantha and Lommie and to harvest the male expedition members' sperm. Unable to establish contact with Karl’s team, Roy gets Thale to use his telepathic powers to probe the Eagle 16. The team escape with the help of the Nightflyer. After returning, Auggie claims that the women aboard the Eagle 16 had destroyed the crystal. In truth, Auggie had destroyed it himself due to his loyalty to Cynthia. Karl discovers that Agatha is also a telepath.
7	"Transmission"	Damon Thomas	David Schneiderman	December 10, 2018	0.303
Over the next eight months of the voyage, Thale becomes popular with the crew since he is able to use his telepathic abilities to simulate games and fond memories. However, things go south when he loses control of his telepathic abilities, causing some of the crew to experience psychic attacks. Meanwhile, Rowan has developed a relationship with Tessia, who is pregnant with their child. As they approach the volcryn, Melantha grows frustrated that the expedition is getting distracted. While immersing herself in an alternate cyberspace reality, Lommie is stalked by the child version of Cynthia. She realizes that Cynthia has breached the firewall. Karl is able to enter a cyber reality generated by the volcryn probe where he encounters an alternate reality version of his daughter Skye. Karl comes to believe that the volcryn are trying to contact him through his late daughter. Tessia gives birth to a stillborn girl, who rapidly dissolves into spores, forcing the Nightflyer to quarantine the medbay.
8	"Rebirth"	Mark Tonderai	Michael Golamco	December 11, 2018	0.312
Melantha and Rowan attempt to develop an antidote for Tessia and Dr. Tobin, who are quarantined in the medbay with the spores. Roy is with them to provide moral support. Tessia tests the antidote on Tobin but it has no effect on the spores. Meanwhile, Karl immerses himself in the cyber reality and manages to embrace his daughter Skye. Melantha disables the simulation room and summons Karl to help the infected patients. The spores also cause Thale and Agatha to experience debilitating psychic attacks. Speaking through Agatha, Tessia convinces Karl and Roy to initiate the decontamination cycle in order to stop the spores from infecting the rest of the ship. Rowan is devastated by the loss of his wife. Roy survives the decontamination process, revealing himself as an android. The younger Cynthia ambushes Lommie inside the cyber reality version of Greywing Manor. The two Cynthias merge and take possession of Lommie's body, leaving her consciousness trapped inside the cyber reality realm.
9	"Icarus"	Stefan Schwartz	Amy Louise Johnson	December 12, 2018	0.274
As the Nightflyer approaches the volcryn, the expedition discovers that the aliens are a swarm of space-faring lifeforms. Agatha discovers the ability to astral project and imparts that knowledge to Thale. Rowan grieves over the loss of Tessia and their daughter, blaming Agatha and Roy. Tensions grow between Agatha and Karl over the latter's obsession with reaching the volcryn at all costs. Cynthia, who is inhabiting Lommie's body, reveals herself to Auggie. She orders him to download her memory files into her new host and stop the Nightflyer from reaching the volcryn. Auggie sabotages the terraforming chamber, causing an explosion that damages the ship. A bitter Rowan attacks Agatha with an axe, who commits suicide in order to release Thale from the psychic feedback. Before her death, she sends a distress message warning of the danger aboard the Nightflyer. Rowan kills a female crewmember with his axe and seemingly kills Roy before being restrained by ship security. The Nightflyer approaches the volcryn swarm, which manifests in the form of a purple cloud.
10	"All That We Have Found"	Mark Tonderai	Jeff Buhler	December 13, 2018	0.420
Several crew members are killed and wounded by Auggie's sabotage of the Nightflyer's terraforming dome. Agatha is given a space burial. Thale, Karl, and Melantha soon realize that Cynthia is inhabiting Lommie's body. Melantha discovers that the true Roy Eris is a cross-sex clone of Cynthia who inhabits a life-support tank, who had been controlling a healthier robotic duplicate, and that Melantha herself is a direct clone of Cynthia. Believing the Nightflyer to be defiled by the volcryn material, Cynthia plans to escape in a life pod and orders Auggie to shut down the coolant systems to cause the thrusters to overload. Karl takes the life pod and uses it to travel through the volcryn swarm. Melantha foils Auggie's plan with the help of Thale, Rowan, and Lommie, who is inhabiting the crystal sphere. The series ends on a cliffhanger with the Nightflyer approaching the volcryn and Karl reuniting with his wife and daughter in an alternate reality, having vanished from the life pod.

== Release ==
Netflix joined the series as a co-producer, and holds international airing rights in addition to secondary airing rights in the United States. Nightflyers premiered on Syfy on December 2, 2018. The first season consisted of ten episodes. The first season became available to stream on Netflix worldwide on February 1, 2019. Syfy canceled the series in February 2019.

== Reception ==
=== Critical response ===
On review aggregation website Rotten Tomatoes, the series has an approval rating of 33% based on 27 reviews, with an average rating of 5.41/10. The website's critical consensus reads: "Unsettling without being particularly scary, Nightflyers's low-budget aesthetics and over-reliance on homage betray its intriguing philosophical pondering and impressive creative pedigree". Metacritic, which uses a weighted average, assigned a score of 47 out of 100 based on 14 critics, indicating "mixed or average reviews".

Alex McLevy of The A.V. Club was disappointed that the show does not do more to upend genre conventions the way Game of Thrones successfully did, writing, "The showrunner Jeff Buhler doesn’t quite know how to make it feel new again". McLevy praised the show for its "appealing visual style" despite budgetary limitations, and of the acting cast, he singled out Maya Eshet, "who elevates every scene in which she appears". He compared the show to the film Event Horizon and called the show engaging but lacking in depth, suggesting the show may appeal more to those who already enjoy the sci-fi horror genre.

=== Ratings ===
Viewership and ratings per episode of Nightflyers
No.	Title	Air date	Rating (18–49)	Viewers (millions)	DVR (18–49)	DVR viewers (millions)	Total (18–49)	Total viewers (millions)
1	"All That We Left Behind"	December 2, 2018	0.15	0.623	0.09	0.336	0.24	0.959
2	"Torches and Pitchforks"	December 3, 2018	0.14	0.414	0.08	0.257	0.22	0.671
3	"The Abyss Stares Back"	December 4, 2018	0.09	0.390	0.10	0.314	0.19	0.704
4	"White Rabbit"	December 5, 2018	0.08	0.319	0.06	0.238	0.14	0.557
5	"Greywing"	December 6, 2018	0.12	0.470	0.06	0.236	0.18	0.706
6	"The Sacred Gift"	December 9, 2018	0.08	0.424	0.06	0.220	0.14	0.644
7	"Transmission"	December 10, 2018	0.08	0.303	0.06	0.250	0.13	0.503
8	"Rebirth"	December 11, 2018	0.05	0.312	0.04	0.200	0.09	0.512
9	"Icarus"	December 12, 2018	0.06	0.274	0.04	0.193	0.10	0.467
10	"All That We Have Found"	December 13, 2018	0.09	0.420	0.04	0.203	0.13	0.623

=== Accolades ===
Award	Date of ceremony	Category	Recipient(s)	Result	Ref.
Visual Effects Society Awards	February 5, 2019	Outstanding Animated Character in an Episode or Real-Time Project	Peter Giliberti, James Chretien, Ryan Cromie, Cesar Dacol Jr. for "All That We Have Found" – Eris	Nominated	
