= The Beast Within (novel) =

1981 American horror novel

- First edition
- Author: Edward Levy
- Language: English
- Genre: Horror
- Publisher: Arbor House
- Publication date: 1981
- Publication place: United States
- Pages: 264
- ISBN: 0595149235

The Beast Within is a 1981 horror novel written by American horror novelist Edward Levy. The Beast Within was also made into a movie in 1982.

== History ==
Brooklyn-born writer Edward Levy wrote his first novel, Came a Spider, in 1978. The Beast Within followed in 1981. Levy published a third novel in 2020, entitled Something Most Evil. Levy's novel The Beast Within was also made into a movie in 1982.

== Plot summary ==
The book begins in the 1920s on the farm of Henry Scruggs. Henry is a fanatically religious man who believes that people are vile and base, and that sex—even marital sex—is repulsive and sinful. Henry's Wife, Sarah, much younger than Henry, disagrees. One day, a traveling salesman named Jimmy Connors shows up at the farm, telling them his car broke down. Feeling unusually hospitable, Henry gives the man some dinner and lets him sleep in the barn for the night. After she thinks that her husband has fallen asleep, Sarah sneaks out to the barn and is seduced by Connors. Unfortunately for both of them, Henry catches them in the act and knocks Connors unconscious. When he awakens, he finds himself chained in Henry's basement. Henry tells him that he has murdered Sarah and that he plans on keeping him prisoner for "a long time". Connors is held captive for over 20 years, and eventually, the constant abuse and grotesque food drive him to become more beast than man. He loses all memory of his former self and is simply an animal content to live its life in bondage. But Henry dies, and the creature escapes from its prison into the surrounding forest to avoid starvation.

It finds its way close to the home of Eli and Carolyn MacCleary, a young married couple. One night, when Eli is at work, Carolyn ventures outside and is knocked unconscious by the creature hunting for food, frightened at her approach. Some long-forgotten instinct awakens in the beast and it rapes her. After it has finished, it leaves her alone in the forest to resume its food search. It tries to catch a snake but is bitten and dies from the serpent's venom.

Carolyn becomes pregnant from the attack, but is unaware of her rape and so assumes that the child is her husband's. The baby is born and they name him Michael. Michael is an affectionate child, but they notice strange things about him. Animals have a bizarre reaction to him, and he is intensely claustrophobic. As he grows, his parents discover that a peculiar transformation overcomes him when night falls, as if his entire personality has changed. He slips into trances and prowls the forest, killing the animals he encounters. Eli boards up his windows to prevent him from escaping at night, and soon thereafter, Michael's "spells" seem to relent...until he hits puberty, at least.

As a teenager, Michael falls in love with a girl he knows from school, but is also afraid of hurting her because of his transformations. However, he lets his guard down and even decides to marry her. Before they can leave together, though, he kills a bully at school who tried to attack him. Wanting to get out of town as soon as possible, he and his girlfriend drive to her house to pick up some of her things. As it turns out, her house used to be the home of Henry Scruggs, and from the moment he steps in the door the beast within him (which consists of the emotions, senses, and savage hungers of the creature that was his biological father) springs to the surface and he is left violently insane. Instead of confining him in a mental institution, his parents decide to keep him in the house's cellar, hoping for the day that he might recover.

== Reception ==
The Dayton Daily News said that the book "is not for everyone. Attacks are described in graphic detail... Still, the characters are convincingly developed, and for those who like a good fright, The Beast Within keeps on delivering." The Raleigh News and Observer also called the book "a gripping thriller of lycanthropy in the Ozarks."

However, the Johnson City Press said that in the ending, "Levy seems to have mixed his manifestations at the last minute, from the near plausible to the impossible, leaving the reader feeling slightly misled."

== Film adaptation ==
The Beast Within is a 1982 Hollywood horror film loosely based on the novel. Hollywood producer Harvey Bernhard heard the title of the Levy novel from an Arbor House book catalog and he purchased the rights before the book was finished. Since the book was unfinished, the movie has little resemblance to the novel. The film was panned by The New York Times: calling it a "very foolish horror film".

== See also ==
- The Curse of the Werewolf, a 1961 horror film with a similar plotline
