= Gwynne McElveen =

Irish actresses

Gwynne McElveen is an American-born Irish actress, writer, and director. After becoming known for her stage performances in Irish theatre, she moved to London and wrote and co-directed the documentary film Penumbra, about a friend on death row in Arizona. She has since acted in films and television series, including playing Tobis in the 2018 American horror science fiction television series Nightflyers.

== Early life and education ==
Gwynne McElveen was born in Los Angeles, California, but moved to Ireland with her family as a child.

She attended the Gaiety School of Acting in Dublin, graduating in 1993. She made her non-professional stage debut in the school's 1993 production of Colin Teevan's Tear up The Black Sail.

She later retrained at Bow Street Academy in Dublin.

== Career ==
McElveen's professional stage debut was in 1994's True Lines, directed by John Crowley and devised alongside the director by McElveen, Stuart Townsend, Cathy Belton and Tom Murphy. True Lines received critical acclaim, including from noted Irish theatre critic, Fintan O'Toole, and went on to win the Stewart Parker Award. True Lines was first performed in Kilkenny; it later moved to the Dublin Theatre Festival and on to the Bush Theatre in London.

McElveen became well known in the 1990s from her stage work, including:

- Ophelia in Second Age's Hamlet
- Lucy Manet at the Gate Theatre
- Eileen in Billy Roche's Poor Beast in The Rain, directed by Garry Hynes for Druid Theatre Company
- Angelica in Rimini Riddle at the Cork Opera House
- Titania in A Midsummer Night's Dream at Hampton Court Palace

While living in London, McElveen wrote and co-directed the award-winning documentary Penumbra about a friend on death row in Arizona. The film was supported by the UK Film Council.

Returning to acting, McElveen retrained at Bow Street Academy in Dublin. Shortly afterwards, Maureen Hughes, casting director, cast her as Catherine Finnegan in RTÉ's second series of Striking Out (2018). She was cast in Mary McGuckian's feature film A Girl from Mogadishu, based on the life of Ifrah Ahmed and filmed in Dublin.

McElveen played Garda Niamh O'Donoughue in the 2018 TV series Doing Money written by Gwyneth Hughes for BBC 2. Based on a true story, the-90 minute film was the flagship of "Why Slavery?", an international season of programmes scheduled for BBC in October 2018 to tie in with International Anti-Slavery Day.

She went on to play Tobis in the Syfy series Nightflyers, released in the US in December 2018.
