= Motel Hell =

1980 comedy horror film by Kevin Connor

- Theatrical release poster
- Directed by: Kevin Connor
- Written by: Robert Jaffe; Steven-Charles Jaffe
- Produced by: Robert Jaffe; Steven-Charles Jaffe
- Starring: Rory Calhoun; Paul Linke; Nancy Parsons; Nina Axelrod; Wolfman Jack
- Cinematography: Thomas Del Ruth
- Edited by: Bernard Gribble
- Music by: Lance Rubin
- Distributed by: United Artists
- Release date: October 18, 1980
- Running time: 101 minutes
- Country: United States
- Language: English
- Budget: $3 million
- Box office: $6.3 million

Motel Hell is a 1980 American comedy horror film directed by Kevin Connor and starring Rory Calhoun, Nancy Parsons, and Nina Axelrod. The plot follows farmer, butcher, motel manager, and meat entrepreneur Vincent Smith, who, with the help of his sister Ida, traps travelers and harvests them for his human sausages. The film's screenplay was written by brothers Robert and Steven-Charles Jaffe, who also served as producers.

Connor was hired to direct Motel Hell based on his previous directorial credits in the horror genre, namely his feature film debut, From Beyond the Grave (1974). Principal photography of Motel Hell took place in the spring of 1980, mainly at the Sable Ranch in Santa Clarita, California.

Released by United Artists in the fall of 1980, Motel Hell received mixed reviews, with some critics praising its elements of comedy and satire, while others found its violence distasteful. The film went on to develop a cult following, and has been cited by film scholars as a satire and parody of contemporary horror films such as Psycho (1960) and The Texas Chain Saw Massacre (1974).

== Plot ==
Farmer Vincent Smith and his younger sister, Ida, live on a farm with an attached motel, named "Motel Hello". Vincent's renowned smoked meat is actually human flesh. He sets traps on nearby roads to catch victims. He buries the victims up to their necks in his "secret garden", then cuts their vocal cords to prevent them from screaming. They are kept in the ground and fed until they are ready for "harvest". Ida helps Vincent, as they both see the victims as animals.

Vincent shoots out the front tire of a couple's motorcycle. The man, Bo, is placed in the garden, but Vincent brings the woman, Terry, to the motel. Sheriff Bruce, Vincent's naive younger brother, arrives the next morning. Vincent tells Terry her boyfriend died in the accident and was buried. A trip to the graveyard shows his crude grave marker. With nowhere to go, Terry decides to stay at the motel. She gradually becomes attracted to Vincent's honest manner and folksy charm, much to the dismay of Bruce, who tries to woo her without success.

Vincent captures more victims by placing wooden cardboards of cows in the middle of the highway to cause his victims to stop, allowing him to capture them. With this method, he manages to capture Suzi and uses sleeping gas to put her to sleep. He also places a fake ad and lures in a pair of swingers, who believe the hotel to be a swing joint. The next day, Vincent suggests that he teach Terry to smoke meat. Ida becomes jealous and attempts to drown Terry, but Vincent arrives to save her. This causes Terry to fall completely in love with him, and she tries to seduce Vincent. Vincent denies her advances, saying they must marry first. She agrees to marry the following day.

Bruce visits the motel to protest Terry's choice. He tells Terry that Vincent has "syphilis of the brain". Vincent arrives and drives off his brother with a shotgun. Vincent, Terry, and Ida drink champagne, but Ida drugs Terry's glass, and she faints. Ida and Vincent then prepare some victims for the wedding. Meanwhile, Bruce investigates the disappearances and becomes suspicious of his brother.

Vincent and Ida kill three victims and take them to the slaughterhouse. As they remove the victims' bodies, the dirt around Bo loosens, and he begins to escape. Bruce sneaks back to the motel to rescue Terry, but Ida returns. She ambushes Bruce and knocks him out, then holds Terry at gunpoint, to the meat processing plant, where Vincent reveals his secret. Terry is horrified by the prospect of smoking human flesh. Meanwhile, Bo escapes and frees the other victims from the garden. Ida goes back to the motel to get something to eat, but the victims attack her and knock her unconscious. Terry tries to escape, but Vincent gases her and ties her to a conveyor belt. He is interrupted by Bo, who crashes through a window, but Vincent strangles the weakened Bo.

Bruce awakens and finds one of his brother's shotguns. He goes to the plant but finds that his brother has armed himself with a giant chainsaw and placed a pig's head over his own as a gruesome mask. Vincent disarms his brother, but Bruce grabs his own chainsaw and duels with Vincent. During the fight, the belt restraining Terry is activated, sending her slowly toward a cutting blade. Despite his wounds, Bruce drives the chainsaw deep into Vincent's side. Bruce frees Terry and returns to Vincent. He gasps out his final words, leaving the farm and the "secret garden" to Bruce, and lamenting his own hypocrisy in using preservatives.

Bruce and Terry go to the "secret garden" and find only Ida, who is buried headfirst. As they leave the motel, Bruce comments that he is glad he left home when he was 11. Terry suggests burning the motel, claiming it is evil.

Afterward, the neon sign reading "Motel Hello" short-circuits and permanently darkens the "O".

== Cast ==
- Rory Calhoun as Vincent Smith
- Paul Linke as Sheriff Bruce Smith
- Nancy Parsons as Ida Smith
- Nina Axelrod as Terry
- Wolfman Jack as Reverend Billy
- Elaine Joyce as Edith Olson
- Dick Curtis as Guy Robaire / 1st TV Preacher
- Monique St. Pierre as Debbie
- Rosanne Katon as Suzi
- E. Hampton Beagle as Bob Anderson
- Everett Creach as Bo Tulinski
- Michael Melvin as Ivan
- John Ratzenberger as Drummer
- Marc Silver as Guitarist
- Victoria Hartman as Female Terrible
- Gwil Richards as Mr. Owen
- Toni Gillman as Mrs. Owens
- Shaylin Hendrixson as Twin #1
- Heather Hendrixson as Twin #2

== Production ==
=== Development ===
Motel Hell was written and produced by brothers Robert Jaffe and Steven-Charles Jaffe, who, up to that point, had never worked on a screenplay together. According to Robert, the story "sprung forth full-blown from our demented minds". The screenplay was finished around 1977, after four weeks, although selling it proved difficult. According to Steven-Charles, studios "either hated it or thought it was the most bizarre script they'd ever read". The Jaffes had been impressed by director Tobe Hooper's 1974 horror film The Texas Chain Saw Massacre, and Universal Pictures planned to produce Motel Hell at one point with Hooper directing. However, the studio backed out of the project upon reading the script, which Robert speculated was "probably a little too far out for their tastes". United Artists (UA) also rejected it, but reconsidered several months later, following executive changes and the rising popularity of shock films. The Jaffes eventually reached a production deal with UA.

Besides Hooper, the Jaffes had also been impressed with director Kevin Connor's 1974 horror film From Beyond the Grave, and ultimately hired him to direct Motel Hell. They were both pleased with his work, especially his handling of the film's "very fine line of black humor". By Connor's recollection, he was hired for the project after having spent three unsuccessful months in Los Angeles attempting to find work. Film agent Bobby Litman approached Connor to direct: "I told the Jaffe brothers that I would love to direct the movie as long as it was a black comedy, and removing all unnecessary crudeness," said Connor. "They agreed, and that is the movie you see today."

=== Filming ===
Filming began on April 23, 1980, and concluded on June 12, on a budget of approximately $3 million. Connor described the shoot as "very pleasant" and noted that the entire cast were "a delight."

A primary filming location was the Sable Ranch in Santa Clarita, California. Most of the interior filming took place at Laird International Studios in Culver City, California. A day of filming also took place in Moorpark, California.

According to Connor, the chainsaw duel scene in the film's finale was devised during the shoot and was not a part of the original screenplay. Connor recalled that the scene was filmed over the course of one day: "The big problem was that by now the carcasses of the pigs were somewhat ripe. The chainsaws had rubber blades and we used stuntmen when the characters wore the pig heads."

== Release ==
Motel Hell received select midnight screenings in the United States on October 18, 1980 before its release expanded on October 24, 1980.

=== Home media ===
MGM/UA issued Motel Hell on VHS in October 1986.

In 2002, MGM released Motel Hell as part of its "Midnite Movies" collection of double-feature DVDs with the 1974 film Deranged.

On May 13, 2013, Arrow Video released the film on Blu-ray in region B in the United Kingdom On August 12, 2014, Scream Factory released a region A Blu-ray for distribution in the United States and Canada. Scream Factory issued the film for the first time in UHD 4K Blu-ray on June 27, 2023.

== Reception ==
=== Box office ===
Motel Hell grossed $6,342,668 at the United States box office.

=== Critical response ===
On the review aggregator website Rotten Tomatoes, 63% of 27 critics' reviews are positive, with an average rating of 5.6/10. The website's consensus reads: "Eerie and satirical, Motel Hell has no vacancy when it comes to low-brow horror gags." Metacritic, which uses a weighted average, assigned the film a score of 64 out of 100, based on 7 critics, indicating "generally favorable" reviews.

Kevin Thomas of the Los Angeles Times felt the material was beneath the filmmakers and cast, deeming the film "so totally inept that it plays like a protracted sick joke." Donna Chernin of The Plain Dealer deemed the film "a revolting mess." Joe Baltake of the Philadelphia Daily News noted that the film "starts of fine and funny" but that ultimately "none of it is as funny as it is intended to be, but it's often very gross–more than it needs to be."

Roger Ebert alternately gave the film a favorable score of three out of four stars, writing: "What Motel Hell brings to this genre is the refreshing sound of laughter. This movie is disgusting, of course; it's impossible to satirize this material, I imagine, without presenting the subject matter you're satirizing." Adam Tyner of DVD Talk gave the film four out of five stars, writing, "With its cacklingly dark sense of humor and some unforgettably twisted visuals, Motel Hell still feels fresh and wildly unique even all these decades later."

Anthony Arrigo from Dread Central rated the film a score of four out of five stars, calling it "a darkly humorous film, played straight, replete with equal parts hilarity and horror".

Author and film critic Leonard Maltin awarded the film one-and-a-half out of four stars. In his review, Maltin wrote that, although it was nice to see Rory and Wolfman share screen credit and commended its lively finale, he felt that the film still failed to distinguish itself.

Chuck Bowen from Slant Magazine awarded the film three out of five stars, writing that, although the horror portion of the film was somewhat effective, it failed to be even remotely funny.

== Legacy ==
Motel Hell has gained a cult following over the years since its original release. Writing in a 2025 retrospective for Rue Morgue, Bill Reick observed: "A great argument for silliness in horror is Motel Hell from 1980. It’s somehow light and fun while also being gross and dark all at the same time. It has such a unique tone that you’ll know if you’re in or out pretty quickly." Writer John Kenneth Muir praised the film in his book Horror Films of the 1980s (2012), deeming it a "country masterpiece and satire," adding: "Motel Hell is a black comedy about hypocrisy, about the way in which every person, even serial killers like Farmer Vincent, tell themselves little lies to get through the day. It's easier to do terrible things, one concludes, when you believe you're doing good." Film critic Barry Keith Grant describes the film as "a sendup of modern horror with special reference to Psycho and The Texas Chain Saw Massacre."

The film is referenced in the weird horror short story "Metaphysica Morum" by Thomas Ligotti. The film is similarly referenced in Ligotti's 2010 book The Conspiracy Against the Human Race, his only non-fiction work. In 2010, a comic book of the same name based on the movie was published by IDW Publishing.

== See also ==
- Karl Denke – a German serial killer and cannibal believed to have sold the flesh of his victims as meat to unsuspecting customers

== Sources ==
- Grant, Barry Keith (1996). The Dread of Difference: Gender and the Horror Film. Austin, Texas: University of Texas Press. ISBN 978-0-292-72794-6.
- Hallenbeck, Bruce G. (2009). Comedy-Horror Films: A Chronological History, 1914–2008. Jefferson, North Carolina: McFarland & Company. ISBN 978-0-7864-1112-2.
- Ligotti, Thomas (2010). The Conspiracy Against the Human Race. New York, New York: Viking Press. ISBN 978-0-143-13314-8.
- Ligotti, Thomas (2014). The Spectral Link. Burton, Michigan: Subterranean Press. ISBN 978-1-596-06650-2.
- Maltin, Leonard (2013). Leonard Maltin's 2014 Movie Guide. New York City, New York: Penguin Books. ISBN 978-1-101-60955-2.
- Muir, John Kenneth (2012). Horror Films of the 1980s. Vol. 1. Jefferson, North Carolina: McFarland & Company. ISBN 978-0-786-47298-7.
- Prince, Stephen (2000). Screening Violence. New Brunswick, New Jersey: Rutgers University Press. ISBN 978-0-813-52817-5.
- Sipos, Thomas M. (2010). Horror Film Aesthetics: Creating the Visual Language of Fear. Jefferson, North Carolina: McFarland & Company. ISBN 978-0-786-45834-9. OCLC 607320273.
