= Steven Bach =

American film studio executive and writer

- Born: April 29, 1938; United States
- Died: March 25, 2009 (aged 70); United States
- Citizenship: United States
- Occupations: Writer, lecturer, studio executive
- Writing career
- Language: English

Steven Bach (April 29, 1938 – March 25, 2009) was an American writer and lecturer on film and a former senior vice-president and head of worldwide productions for United Artists.

== Career ==
Starting out at Pantheon Films, he worked on The Parallax View and the original The Taking of Pelham One Two Three, going on to produce Mr. Billion and Butch and Sundance: The Early Days. Moving on to United Artists, he was responsible for highly successful films like Rich Kids, Wanda Nevada, Cuba, Roller Boogie, Those Lips, Those Eyes, Stardust Memories, and Eye of the Needle.

However, he was also closely involved in the troublesome production and release of Heaven's Gate (1980). He wrote a book about the ordeal, called Final Cut: Art, Money, and Ego in the Making of Heaven's Gate, the Film That Sank United Artists, where, according to the LA Times, he "was unsparing about his own failures, and those of Cimino, who, by the end of the first six days of shooting, was five days behind schedule and had spent almost a million dollars on 1 1/2 minutes of film." United Artists was sold to MGM while Heaven's Gate was being shown at the Cannes Film Festival.

== Later years ==
His book was made into the 2004 documentary Final Cut: The Making and Unmaking of Heaven's Gate, featuring interviews with Bach and others involved in the production, as well as archival material. The book received positive reviews from the Los Angeles Times and the New York Times, with the latter calling it "a fascinating and detailed account of the imbroglio that attended the creation of a catastrophically bad movie." The book review site The Pequod rated the book a 9.5 (out of 10.0) and said, "By using a specific case study, Bach has produced one of the best insider accounts of what it is really like to make a movie — how the studio, director, producers, and actors all work together to steer a project from the time of screenwriting through its release."

In 1990, he was a member of the jury at the 40th Berlin International Film Festival.

Bach is the author of The Life and Legend of Marlene Dietrich and Dazzler: The Life and Times of Moss Hart. His biography of the Nazi-associated filmmaker Leni: The Life and Work of Leni Riefenstahl (2007) overturns many of the claims Riefenstahl put forward in her self-defence regarding her contact with Hitler's regime, and was named by The New York Times as one of the best books of 2007.

He taught film studies at Columbia University and Bennington College.

Bach died of cancer in March 2009. He was survived by his companion, Werner Röhr.

== Bibliography ==
- Final Cut: Dreams and Disaster in the Making of Heaven's Gate, 1985, New York: William Morrow, ISBN 978-0-688-04382-7
- Marlene Dietrich: Life and Legend, 1992, New York: William Morrow, ISBN 978-0-688-07119-6
- Dazzler: The Life and Times of Moss Hart, 2001, New York: Alfred A. Knopf, ISBN 978-0-679-44154-0
- Leni: The Life and Work of Leni Riefenstahl, 2007, New York: Alfred A. Knopf, ISBN 978-0-375-40400-9).
