= Gabriel Katzka =

American film producer

- Born: January 25, 1931; Brooklyn, New York
- Died: February 19, 1990 (aged 59); New York, New York
- Resting place: Kensico Cemetery, Valhalla, New York
- Education: Columbia Grammar & Preparatory School; Kenyon College
- Occupations: Theater, movie and television producer
- Spouse: Carol Ward Dudley Katzka
- Children: Edward Dudley Katzka
- Parent: Emil Katzka
- Relatives: Benji K. Green (sister)

Gabriel Katzka (January 23, 1931 – February 19, 1990) was an American theater, film and television producer.

== Biography ==
=== Early life ===
He was born in Brooklyn, New York City on January 25, 1931. His father, Emil Katzka, was a lawyer who had a stake in some Broadway productions. He had a sister, Benji K. Green. He attended Columbia Grammar & Preparatory School. He graduated from Kenyon College in Gambier, Ohio.

=== Career ===
He produced many films and plays. He was noted for his uncanny ability to raise financial capital for theatrical and cinematic productions.

=== Personal life ===
He was married Carol Ward Dudley Katzka, and they had a son, Edward Dudley Katzka. They lived on the Upper East Side in Manhattan. He died on February 19, 1990, in New York. A memorial service was performed at the Frank E. Campbell Funeral Chapel in Manhattan and at the Beverly Wilshire Hotel in Beverly Hills, California. He was buried in the Kensico Cemetery in Valhalla, New York.

== Work ==
He was producer for all films unless otherwise noted.

=== Film ===
Year	Film	Credit	Notes
1969	Marlowe		
1970	Kelly's Heroes		
1970	Soldier Blue		
1974	The Parallax View	Executive producer	
1974	The Taking of Pelham One Two Three		
1977	Mr. Billion	Executive producer	
1978	Who'll Stop the Rain		
1979	Butch and Sundance: The Early Days		
1979	Meteor	Executive producer	
1982	The Beast Within		
1983	The Lords of Discipline		
1985	The Falcon and the Snowman		Final film as a producer

Miscellaneous crew

Year	Film	Role
1961	Angel Baby	Assistant to producer
1968	Nobody Runs Forever	Production associate
1976	Cannonball	Friend
1977	A Bridge Too Far	Production consultant
1978	Who'll Stop the Rain	Presenter
1985	The Falcon and the Snowman	Presenter

=== Television ===
Year	Title	Credit	Notes
1980	The Courage of Kavik the Wolf Dog	Executive producer	Television film
1981	Isabel's Choice		Television film
1984	Ellis Island	Executive producer	
1986	Philip Marlowe, Private Eye	Executive producer	
1987	Mariah	Executive producer	

=== As a theater producer ===
- Hamlet
- Comedians directed by Filipa
- Barefoot in the Park
- Things That Go Bump in the Night
- Hughie
- Beyond the Fringe
