= The Beast Within (1982 film) =

Film by Philippe Mora

- Theatrical release poster
- Directed by: Philippe Mora
- Written by: Tom Holland
- Based on: The Beast Within by Edward Levy
- Produced by: Harvey Bernhard; Gabriel Katzka
- Starring: Ronny Cox; Bibi Besch; Paul Clemens; Don Gordon
- Cinematography: Jack L. Richards
- Edited by: Robert Brown; Bert Lovitt
- Music by: Les Baxter
- Production company: Katzka
- Distributed by: United Artists
- Release date: February 12, 1982
- Running time: 98 minutes
- Country: United States
- Language: English
- Budget: $5 million
- Box office: $7.7 million

The Beast Within is a 1982 American supernatural horror film directed by Philippe Mora from a screenplay by Tom Holland, and starring Ronny Cox, Bibi Besch, Paul Clemens, and Don Gordon. Set in a small town in rural Mississippi, the story centers on a couple Eli and Caroline MacCleary's son Michael, who begins exhibiting strange behavior after his 17th birthday.

Producer Harvey Bernhard had purchased the rights to the then-unfinished novel based on the title alone. Due to the book not having been finished prior to production, the resulting script bears little resemblance to the source material. Principal photography officially began on February 8, 1981, in and around Jackson, Mississippi and concluded on April 10, 1981.

The Beast Within was released theatrically on February 12, 1982, by United Artists, and grossed a total of $7.7 million at the U.S. box office. The film drew criticism from film critics for its depictions of graphic violence and rape, as well as for its amalgamation of horror elements that numerous reviewers felt lacked cohesion; other critics, however, praised it for its tone and style, which was likened to that of the monster movies of the 1950s, as well as for its Southern Gothic atmosphere and themes, which drew comparison to the works of Tennessee Williams.

== Plot ==
In 1964 on a rural Mississippi backroad, newlyweds Caroline and Eli MacCleary get stranded. While Eli walks to a service station to retrieve a tow truck, an unseen creature escapes from a nearby cellar before attacking and raping Caroline. Eli and the service station attendant find the brutalized Caroline lying in the forest. As they drive off, two gunshots are heard.

Seventeen years later, the MacClearys' son Michael, conceived as a result of Caroline's rape, has become ill. The family returns to Mississippi looking for information about the man who assaulted Caroline, in case Michael's illness is genetic. They learn about the unsolved murder of a mortician named Lionel Curwin, seventeen years prior. The townspeople, including Judge Curwin and newspaper editor Edwin Curwin, refuse to tell them anything. Eli and Caroline ask Sheriff Bill Poole about Lionel's death. Poole tells them Lionel's corpse was found partially eaten.

Seemingly possessed, Michael murders and cannibalizes Edwin Curwin. He stumbles to the home of Amanda Platt and collapses. Amanda calls the police, and Michael is taken to the hospital. Doc Schoonmaker tells Michael's parents that he needs rest. Michael goes to Amanda's house to thank her. Amanda tells Michael she is the daughter of Horace Platt, an abusive alcoholic who is Lionel Curwin's cousin. As the teens kiss, Amanda's dog arrives with a decomposed arm bone. They alert the sheriff. Horace arrives and commands Michael to stay away from Amanda.

Caroline and Michael return to the hospital, while Eli, Poole, and Schoonmaker search for clues. They uncover a swamp full of human bones with human tooth marks. Schoonmaker thinks one bone belonged to a patient of his who died years ago. The men go to the mortuary and question Dexter Ward, who was Lionel Curwin's apprentice when the woman died. Ward denies that anyone else was buried in her place. After the men leave, Ward calls the judge and demands money in return for silence. He is soon killed by a possessed Michael.

At the graveyard, the men discover the woman's coffin is filled with rocks. They return to the mortuary to question Ward but find him dead. Michael, still possessed, finds a man named Tom Laws. Laws converses with the spirit possessing Michael, whom he calls Billy Connors. Assuming direct control of Michael, Connors describes using magic to return as a spirit to punish the Curwin family after his death seventeen years earlier.

The next day, the judge tells Poole to investigate the murders. Laws tries to tell Poole that Connors has possessed Michael and is killing people, but Poole dismisses him. Connors kills Laws for talking to Poole. Afraid of his behavior, Michael goes to Amanda and warns her to leave town. While she packs, Connors and Michael struggle to control Michael's body. Michael throws himself from Amanda's window to prevent Connors from killing her. He returns to the hospital and begs to be killed, fearing that Connors will take over and Michael will be unable to stop him. He tells Poole and Eli to go to Lionel Curwin's house and look in the basement. They find a skeleton with a chain wrapped around its leg, which they assume is Connors's remains.

At the hospital, Poole, Eli, Caroline, and Schoonmaker witness Michael metamorphose into a monster as Connors takes control and kills Horace. Everyone flees to the police station. Judge Curwin confesses that Lionel was responsible for Connors's death. After discovering Connors was having an affair with his wife, Lionel killed her and imprisoned Connors in his cellar. He fed Connors corpses stolen from the mortuary until one night, Connors metamorphosed into a monster, broke free, and killed Lionel. He raped Caroline in the woods before being shot by Lionel's relatives, apparently returning to the cellar to die.

Connors attacks the police station, kills the judge, and is pursued into the forest. He finds Amanda in a broken-down car and rapes her. When Caroline and Eli find him, he attacks Eli, forcing Caroline to shoot him in the head. It is implied that Connors may have impregnated Amanda, continuing the cycle of his resurrection.

== Cast ==
- Paul Clemens as Michael MacCleary
- Ronny Cox as Eli MacCleary
- Bibi Besch as Caroline MacCleary
- Don Gordon as Judge Curwin
- R. G. Armstrong as Doc Schoonmaker
- Katherine Moffat as Amanda Platt
- L. Q. Jones as Sheriff Bill Poole
- Logan Ramsey as Edwin Curwin
- John Dennis Johnston as Horace Platt
- Ron Soble as Tom Laws
- Luke Askew as Dexter Ward
- Meshach Taylor as Deputy Herbert
- Boyce Holleman as Doc Odom

== Themes ==
Several film critics have noted the film's Southern Gothic atmosphere and themes, which have been likened to the works of Tennessee Williams. Writer John Kenneth Muir notes that the film touches on themes of social class in the Southern United States, as well as adopting elements of Romeo and Juliet in its depiction of doomed teenagers from different social classes falling in love. Muir also interprets the Michael MacCleary (Paul Clemens)'s monstrous transformation in the film as a metaphor for male puberty and its relationship to male sexuality.

== Production ==
=== Development ===
The Beast Within was written by Tom Holland, in his first writing credit for a feature film, and directed by Australian director Philippe Mora. The film itself is very loosely based on the 1981 novel The Beast Within written by Edward Levy. Producer Harvey Bernhard had purchased the rights to Levy's then-unfinished novel based on the title alone. However, when pre-production for the film began, Levy had still not completed the novel due to marital difficulties. As a result, Holland was forced to write most of the film's screenplay from scratch, with the final product differing significantly from the novel.

The screenplay was offered to Mora, who had previously directed Mad Dog Morgan (1976), by film agent Bobby Littman. Mora was hired to direct the film for a salary of $100,000. Recounting the project, Mora said: "The budget was five million, which, for United Artists was a joke. They probably thought they could make some money on a quickie by this Australian guy."

The film was developed for United Artists by Gabriel Katzka alongside Harvey Bernhard, a Seattle-based producer who had previously produced the horror film The Omen (1976) as well as its sequels Damien: Omen II (1978) and The Omen: The Final Conflict (1981).

=== Filming ===
The Beast Within was originally intended to be set in Atlanta, Georgia, but the setting was changed after the production preferred locations scouted in Mississippi. Principal photography officially began on February 8, 1981, in and around Jackson, Mississippi. The entire first week of filming was shot at night outdoors. When filming Caroline MacCleary (Bibi Besch)'s rape scene, the actress was required to remain undressed in the cold weather for an extended period of time, and Besch was later rushed to the hospital as a result.

Other scenes were shot in Bolton and Raymond, with hospital scenes filmed at both the former Mississippi Baptist Hospital in Jackson, and the Mississippi State Hospital for the Insane in Whitfield. Filming concluded on April 10, 1981. Director Mora has stated that United Artists cut several scenes from the film which clarified some of the story's plot details.

=== Music ===
The film's soundtrack was composed by Les Baxter, who considered it to be one of his finest, in his final feature-length score. In an interview with Tom Weaver, Baxter stated that he later received a letter from the film's producer Bernhard, praising his score for the film.

== Release ==
United Artists originally intended to release The Beast Within around Halloween 1981. The film was released theatrically on February 12, 1982, opening in 550 theaters in the United States. It remained in theatrical exhibition for 46 weeks.

=== Home media ===
The film was released on DVD in the United States by MGM Home Entertainment as part of their Midnite Movies line in 2001. This version is currently out of print.

It was later released on Blu-ray by Scream Factory on December 17, 2013. In the United Kingdom, the film was released in a special edition Blu-ray by Arrow Films in 2014. Kino Lorber reissued the film on Blu-ray in North America as part of their Kino Cult line on December 31, 2024.

== Reception ==
=== Box office ===
The film grossed $1,250,000 on its opening weekend with an average of $2,545 per theater, ranking at number 10 at the United States box office. The film ended up grossing $7,742,572.

=== Critical response ===
==== Contemporary ====
The Beast Within received mixed reviews from critics at the time of its release, with several critiquing its overt violent content. Joe Baltake of the Philadelphia Daily News was critical of the film's graphic depictions of violence and rape, assessing it as part of the "new breed of horror trash." The Chicago Tribune's Howard Reich gave the film a zero-star rating, panning it for its violence and gore. Jim Davidson of The Pittsburgh Press also found the film's sequences of rape and murder "disturbing" but did not deem them exploitative, and wrote favorably of the film's story and tone, which he likened to 1950s monster movies.

Several critics expressed that the film suffered from a lack of cohesion due to its amalgamation of various horror elements, which include possession, monster transformation, cannibalism, grave robbery, and murder. Bruce McCabe of The Boston Globe noted this mixture of horror tropes as unsuccessful, but did note that the film is "good (i.e. raunchy) enough to be considered part of the contemporary punk-film pantheon." The Albuquerque Journal's Charlie Coates similarly observed that screenplay exhibits "lapses in logic" but praised its "consistent geographic unity" and "workmanlike acting." Kevin Thomas of the Los Angeles Times felt that the film "might have been fun if its premise weren't so maddeningly vague," though he also praised the performances of the cast.

Vincent Canby of The New York Times gave the film a negative review calling its plot "very foolish" and also criticized the lead performances. Robert C. Trussell of The Kansas City Star similarly felt the film's plot was derivative, but praised its "offbeat quality" as well as director Philippe Mora's "deft handling of alternately satirical and horrifying subject matter." Writing for The Oregonian, critic Ted Mahar described the film as a "gross caricature of teen-age concerns," but did praise the cast as well as the film's Southern Gothic atmosphere, which he likened to the works of Tennessee Williams.

==== Retrospective ====
On the review aggregator website Rotten Tomatoes, 17% of 12 critics' reviews are positive.

Dennis Schwartz from Ozus' World Movie Reviews awarded the film a grade C, calling it "a frightfully silly and insignificant horror film, whose only virtue is in the makeup." Reviewing the film's 2013 Blu-ray release, Mike Hale of The New York Times called it a "respectable" horror film, adding that "[screenwriter] Mr. Holland also created a vivid roster of backwater types, and the film's real attraction is that some of them are played by capable character actors."

TV Guide panned the film, awarding it a score of 1 / 4 and calling the film's premise "outrageous"; however, the reviewer stated that the makeup effects used to transform actor Paul Clemens into a monster were effective and that the film's veteran actors lent credibility to the film's weak premise. Patrick Naugle from DVD Verdict gave the film a mixed review, stating:

The Beast Within won't be to every horror buff's taste. If you're looking for just mindless violence and grizzle and gore, this movie is going to feel like it's a big disappointment. I can't give it a really strong recommendation, but I also can't dismiss it outright. It's got moments that shine and moments that drag. Genre fans may get a kick out of it, for no other reason than seeing a man's head expand to the size of a watermelon.

Chuck Bowen of Slant Magazine gave the film 3.5 out of 4 stars, writing, "The Beast Within isn't as bad as its reputation suggests (there's some atmosphere to burn and an impressive gallery of supporting character actors), but it's really only for blossoming cinephiles and horror aficionados looking to finish their essays... Everyone else would be well-advised to mine the sentiment expressed on the film's cover art: Beware." HorrorNews.net rated the film a score of 3.5 out of 5, commending the film's atmosphere, acting, and makeup effects, while also noting that the plot made little sense. J.C. Macek III of PopMatters gave the film a mixed 5 out of 10 stars, writing:

As it stands, The Beast Within is an above-average monster movie with good actors and a sometimes comprehensible plot. All of the answers are there on the screen, even if they are buried. However, horror fan or not, if you're watching this three or four times to get every snippet of information from the plot, you'll probably wonder what better uses of your time you might have employed.

Jason Shawhan of the Nashville Scene wrote favorably in a retrospective on the film: "One of the most disturbing films made in Mississippi, The Beast Within is a dark fable with all the drama of Tennessee Williams and all the grand guignol cruelties one could hope for. Cycles of violence, class inequality, the trauma of metabolizing sexual assault, cicada culture, and a monster transformation both infamous and famous."

== Potential remake ==
In August 2014, Holland announced that he planned to remake the film. No updates regarding the planned remake have since occurred.

== See also ==
- Cannibalism in popular culture

== Sources ==
- Kane, Paul; O'Regan, Marie (2014). Voices in the Dark: Interviews with Horror Writers, Directors and Actors. Jefferson, North Carolina: McFarland. ISBN 978-0-7864-5672-7.
- Muir, John Kenneth (2010). Horror Films of the 1980s. Vol. 2. Jefferson, North Carolina: McFarland. ISBN 978-0-786-45501-0.
- Weaver, Tom (2010). It Came from Horrorwood: Interviews with Moviemakers in the SF and Horror Tradition. Jefferson, North Carolina: McFarland. ISBN 978-0-7864-8216-0.
