= Maid to Order =

1987 film by Amy Holden Jones

- Theatrical release poster
- Directed by: Amy Jones
- Written by: Amy Jones; Perry Howze; Randy Howze
- Produced by: Herb Jaffe; Mort Engelberg
- Starring: Ally Sheedy; Beverly D'Angelo; Michael Ontkean; Valerie Perrine; Dick Shawn; Tom Skerritt
- Cinematography: Shelly Johnson
- Edited by: Sidney Wolinsky
- Music by: Georges Delerue
- Distributed by: The Vista Organization
- Release date: July 10, 1987
- Running time: 93 minutes
- Country: United States
- Language: English
- Box office: $9,868,521

Maid to Order is a 1987 American comedy film with fantasy film elements, co-written and directed by Amy Holden Jones. The movie stars Ally Sheedy as spoiled rich kid Jessie, who is made penniless when her fairy godmother casts a spell to erase her existence, forcing her to become a white live-in housekeeper for a new money, somewhat washed-up executive's family in the music industry, in a reversal of the Cinderella formula. Through the course of the film, Sheedy's character learns many lessons, such as the value of hard work (including when she is finally able to buy a Sony Walkman tape cassette player to listen to music while she scrubs bathrooms), and the value of friendship (such as when she enables a washed-up but very talented black former singer, who also is a housekeeper where she works, to have a chance to "still shine" and perform on stage at the exec's concert when the original act falls through due to some actions on the part of her fairy godmother).

== Plot ==
Jessica "Jessie" Montgomery (Ally Sheedy) is a bratty, hard-partying rich girl in her mid-20s. Jessie's self-indulgent lifestyle (along with a lack of respect for anything or anybody, even herself) has been wearing thin on her father Charles (Tom Skerritt), a widowed philanthropist. When Jessie's boyfriend Brent (Jason Beghe) breaks up with her, out of frustration with her immaturity and utter lack of values, she couldn't care less. Then, Jessie is arrested for drug possession and DWI with a suspended license (she also attempts to bribe her arresting officers). Charles blames himself for his daughter's downward spiral: Jessie's mother died giving birth to the girl; instead of laying down the law, he spoiled Jessie rotten, often leaving her in the care of his valet Woodrow (Theodore Wilson) and other family retainers. Now, hearing that his daughter has been busted and her car impounded, he says aloud (ostensibly to Woodrow, but also to himself) that he wishes he had never had a daughter. Outside, a star falls. Jessie's identity is magically erased, leaving her fully clothed (albeit in fancy coutre from her father's benefit), but with no resources or possessions, and no family or friends.

Enter Stella Winston (Beverly D'Angelo), a fairy godmother who has been "assigned" to the Montgomery family. Stella pays Jessie's bail and explains what has happened as a result of Charles' wish. Being Jessie, she does not believe a word Stella says. When she walks to her father's mansion, neither he nor any of the servants recognizes her; neither does Jimmy, the family dog. When Jessie breaks into the mansion, she is promptly chased out and has to escape when the police show up.

Wandering the streets, Jessie trips over some girls with whom she recently partied. They insist they have never seen Jessie before in their lives, and shove her away. She once again encounters Stella, who spells out all of Jessie's faults and suggests the girl find a job to provide for herself. Having never worked a day in her life (she dropped out of junior college after six years), Jessie nonetheless succeeds in finding employment as a live-in maid for an eccentric Malibu family: Stan Starkey (Dick Shawn), his wife Georgette (Valerie Perrine), and their daughter Brie (Rain Phoenix). A few years ago, the Starkeys won several million dollars in the lottery; they now aspire to break into the music industry as talent agents.

Gradually, Jessie bonds with the Starkeys' other retainers: cook Audrey (Merry Clayton), a failed singer; fellow maid Maria (Begoña Plaza); and chauffeur Nick (Michael Ontkean), an aspiring songwriter. Jessie learns the true meaning of friendship, hard work, and self-respect, while falling in love with Nick. When she helps Nick and Audrey break into the music business, Jessie's old life is returned to her; her dad and everyone else recognize her again. However, being a better and more mature person, Jessie continues her relationship with Nick; the ending implies that they ultimately get married.

== Cast ==
- Ally Sheedy as Jessie Montgomery
- Beverly D'Angelo as Stella Winston
- Michael Ontkean as Nick McGuire
- Valerie Perrine as Georgette Starkey
- Dick Shawn as Stan Starkey
- Tom Skerritt as Charles Montgomery
- Merry Clayton as Audrey James
- Begoña Plaza as Maria
- Rain Phoenix as Brie Starkey (credited as Rainbow Phoenix)
- Theodore Wilson as Woodrow
- Jason Beghe as Brent
- Katey Sagal as Louise
- Victoria Catlin as Alicia Nolin
- Khandi Alexander as Hooker In Jail
- Henry Woolf as Jailer
- Robert Jaffe as Miles
- Theresa Randle as Doni

== Production ==
Jessie's father's mansion is located at 365 S Hudson Street, Los Angeles, California. The Starkey mansion, where Jessie worked, is located at 32596 Pacific Coast Hwy, Malibu, California. The gas station where Jessie kicks the vending machine was located on Sunset and Swathmore in the Pacific Palisades.

== Release ==
The movie was released on VHS by International Video Entertainment in 1988 and again in 1991 by Avid Home Entertainment. In 2002, Artisan Entertainment (now known as Lionsgate Home Entertainment) released the film on DVD without bonus features and presented in pan-and-scan full screen.

== Reception ==
Reviews were negative. Roger Ebert of the Chicago Sun-Times "found it too easy to anticipate most of the big moments and too hard to believe that Sheedy was really a spoiled, mean-spirited rich bitch." Janet Maslin in The New York Times praised Sheedy, saying her "petulant manner and her air of faint distaste for her surroundings are just right for this role. And she shows herself to be an able physical comedienne."

Maid to Order holds a 42% rating on Rotten Tomatoes based on 12 reviews.
