= Doug Timm =

American composer

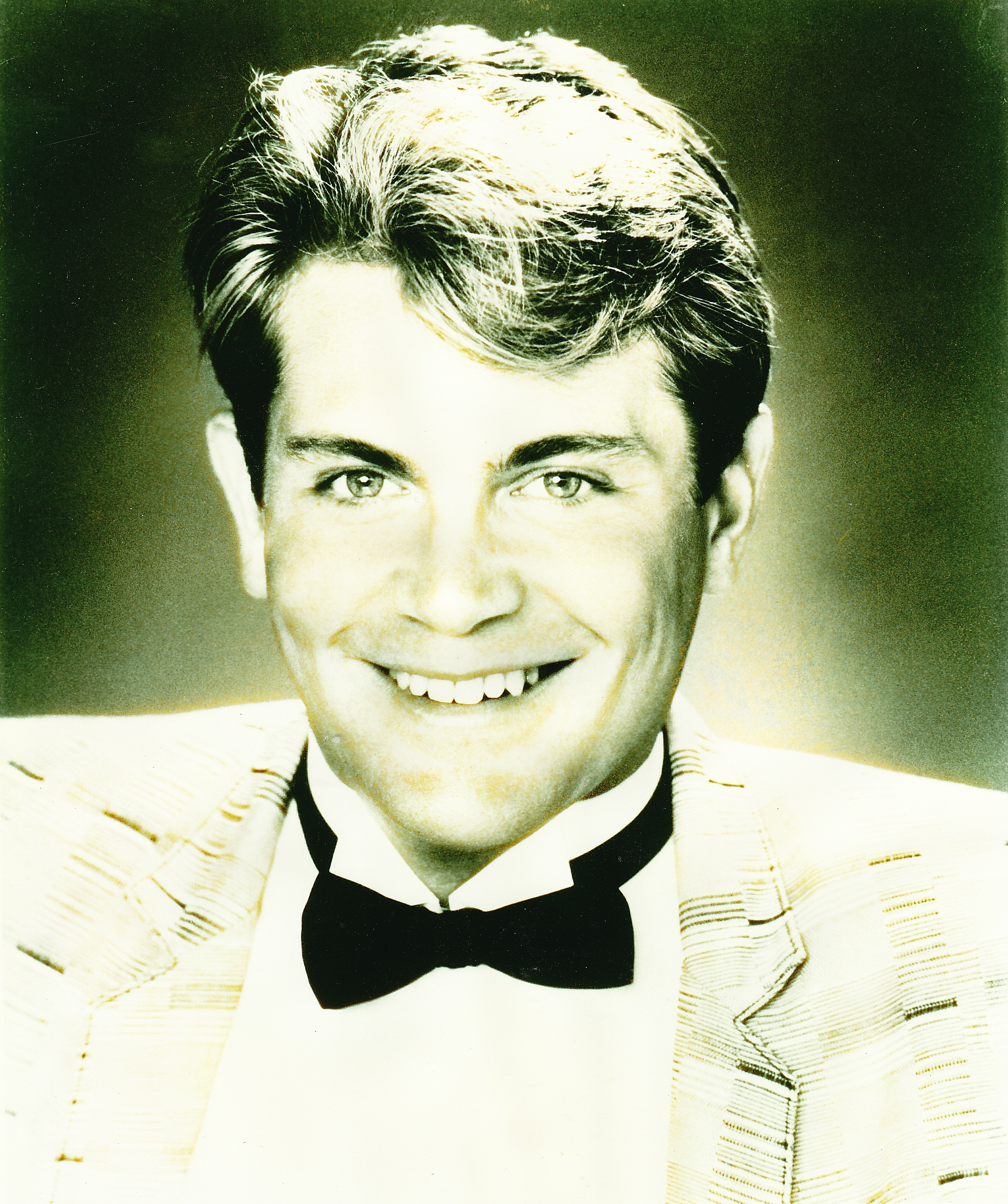

Background information
- Born: Douglas Vernon Timm; June 14, 1960; Chicago, Illinois, U.S.
- Origin: Chicago
- Died: July 21, 1989 (aged 29) Beverly Hills, California, U.S.
- Genres: Film scores
- Occupations: Composer, Music Producer, Orchestrator, songwriter
- Years active: 1984–1989

Douglas Vernon Timm (June 14, 1960 – July 21, 1989) was an American composer and conductor best known for his many music scores, both in television and motion picture films. In a career which was cut short by a tragic event, he composed music for a variety of both television productions as well as motion pictures. His most popular works include music production and music scores to Nightflyers, Terror in the Aisles, as well as many TV series such as Designing Women, Dolphin Cove, The New Mike Hammer, and Simon and Simon.

== Early life ==
Douglas Vernon Timm was born in Chicago Illinois, the son of Wilma (née Hackleman) and Vernon Timm. He grew up in a typical midwest middle-class family of five. Doug also had two younger brothers, Jeff and Ryan.

It was in the 3rd grade that Doug was introduced to music at St. John's Lutheran School and went on to play trumpet and coronet for the school band. He quickly accelerated in the band and went on to take private lessons outside of school. He became locally famous as a trumpet player. He played during Sunday morning services at St. John's, and other churches in the area also requested that he play at their services.

While attending Luther High School North, Doug played trumpet and learned to write and compose music, which he conducted via the school orchestra and jazz bands. Timm also played in the marching band. After being private tutored for a period of time, the tutor approached Doug's mom and said that he couldn't teach Doug any longer, because Doug was better than he was.

After graduation from high school, Doug was awarded a full scholarship to the prestigious Berklee College of Music in Boston, where he majored in film score.

Shortly after graduating from Berklee, Doug moved to Houston, Texas, and opened a recording studio where he wrote, composed, produced, and arranged music for a variety of projects including local advertising agencies. It was the start of Doug's ultimate dream of starting Timm Music Productions out of Sundance Studios in Houston. He worked with local advertising agencies on smaller music productions specifically for television commercials. Doug and his work consequently won many Telly Awards for such advertisements for organizations such as Foleys Department store and Continental Airlines.

Doug moved to Beverly Hills in 1988 to work in Hollywood, California. He worked on various TV series projects and cut his teeth on motion picture projects. His first film was Terror in the Aisles, and he soon landed bigger projects.

== Career ==
Timm wrote, scored, and composed the theme songs, trailer music or other music for more than 50 films, TV shows or commercials in his short career, including Nightflyers, Terror in the Aisles, Night of the Creeps, Winners Take All, Designing Women, The Man Who Fell to Earth, Killer Party, Dolphin Cove, Simon and Simon, Dirty Dozen, The Series, and the trailer music used in such advertising campaigns as Foley's 2-day kid sale, Safeway, and Continental Airlines.

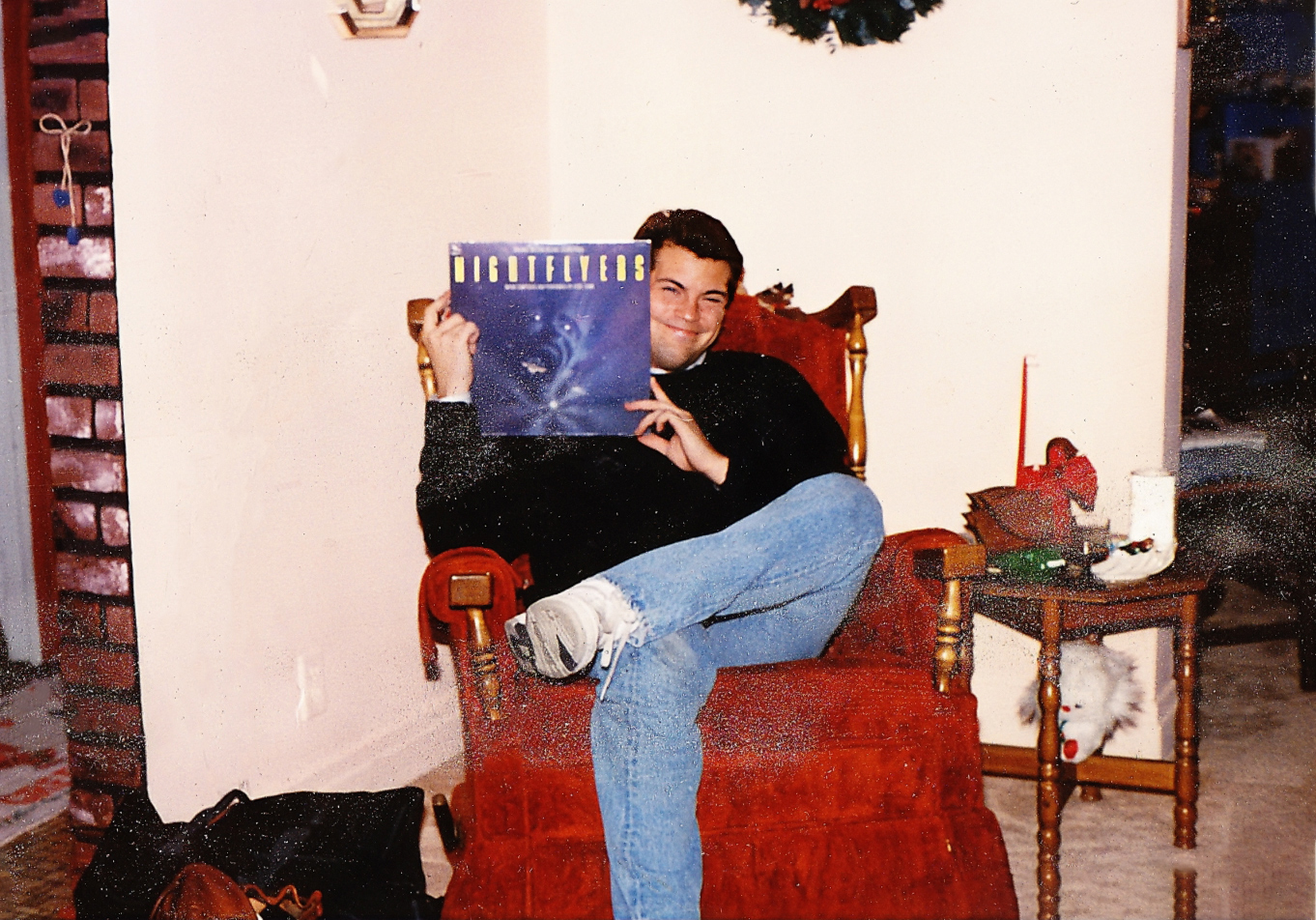
Doug holding his Nightflyers album

=== Soundtracks ===
In October 2010, twenty one years after Doug's death, out of respect and extraordinary recognition of Doug's talents, Varèse Sarabande reissued the soundtrack to Nightflyers (previously released by the label on vinyl in 1987), producing only 1000 copies. The CD sold out in less than 2 weeks.

Timm's score for Nightflyers was described by Daniel Schweiger as "his musical testament, one that would embody a much-beloved time among genre fans for the dawning and ever-evolving style of completely synthesized soundtracks." Schweiger also went on to say, "few composers represented the wondrous possibilities of science fiction, especially given Doug's ability to make this entertaining, flawed, and often ingenious film seem as grandly mysterious as the galaxy this haunted ship was exploring. It's music that sings with promise and enthusiasm, a movie very much about the soul that can be put into a machine."

Acclaimed composer John Beal stated "Doug had his own voice, immediately at the outset of his career start. He was very fresh and didn't copy anyone else in what he was doing. Musically, its hard to say what he would have accomplished in the industry, because Doug was just starting to explode as he explored a lot of different music. But I know he would have been successful. He was bright, sensitive, talented and a dear friend."

=== TV shows ===
Before having the opportunity to get involved with movie projects, Doug worked on a number of TV shows, including Designing Women, Simon and Simon, and Our Family Honor.

== Awards ==
Over the course of his career, Doug won several Telly Awards, for his work in television commercials for such organizations as Foley's department store, Safeway, and Continental Airlines.

In the early 1990s, in memory and recognition for Doug's "extraordinary talent, energy, ethics and commitment to helping others reflect honorably", he was honored with having the Doug Timm Award named after him from the prestigious Berklee College of Music in Boston. This award is given to senior class men and women for recognition of outstanding achievement in the area of film scoring.

== Death ==
On July 21, 1989, at his home in the Hollywood Hills, Timm was killed during a robbery.

== Filmography ==
- Lone Star Bar and Grill (1983) TV series
- Terror in the Aisles (1984)
- Streetwalkin' (1985)
- Our Family Honor (1985) TV series
- Night of the Creeps (1986)
- Dirty Dozen, The Series (1985) TV series+
- Designing Women (1986–1988) TV series
- Simon and Simon (1986) TV series
- Dolphin Cove (1986) TV series
- Nightflyers (1987)
- The Man Who Fell to Earth (1987) TV Movie
- Winners Take All (1987)
- The New Mike Hammer (1987) TV series
- US Marshals: Waco and Rhinehart (1987) TV series
