= Fuzz (film) =

1972 film by Richard A. Colla

- Theatrical release poster
- Directed by: Richard A. Colla
- Screenplay by: Evan Hunter
- Based on: Fuzz (1968 novel) by Ed McBain
- Produced by: Jack Farren
- Starring: Burt Reynolds; Jack Weston; Tom Skerritt; Yul Brynner; Raquel Welch
- Cinematography: Jacques R. Marquette
- Edited by: Robert L. Kimble
- Music by: Dave Grusin
- Production companies: Filmways; Martin Ransohoff Productions
- Distributed by: United Artists
- Release date: May 24, 1972 (Los Angeles)
- Running time: 92 minutes
- Country: United States
- Language: English

Fuzz is a 1972 American crime action comedy film directed by Richard A. Colla and starring Burt Reynolds, Yul Brynner, Raquel Welch, Tom Skerritt, and Jack Weston. It is adapted by Evan Hunter from 1968 novel, which is part of his 87th Precinct series. (Note: In the on-screen credits, Hunter is credited as Evan Hunter for the screenplay, and as Ed McBain for the novel.) The film was released by United Artists on May 24, 1972.

== Plot ==
Over a period of several days, detectives in the Boston Police Department's 87th Precinct investigate a variety of cases.

Detective Steve Carella goes undercover as a homeless man to investigate a spate of attacks in which homeless men have been set on fire. In an alleyway two youths approach him, throw flammable liquid over him, and set him alight. Carella is hospitalized but recovers and returns to his job.

A mysterious caller threatens to kill a city official unless he is paid a $5,000 ransom. Detectives Kling and Brown stake out the drop and follow a man, Tony La Bresca, who takes the box containing the ransom. The police have placed paper in the box. Later, the city parks commissioner is shot dead. A further demand for $50,000 is issued. Another box is placed at an arranged spot and police lie in wait. A man collects the box and is captured but he proves to be an opportunist who thought the box contained marijuana. Later the deputy mayor is killed with a car bomb.

Detective Eileen McHenry is transferred to the precinct to help solve a series of rapes. Detective Meyer asks her to interview a witness, who turns out to be a mentally ill woman who claims to have been attacked by a cape-wearing man. Carella and Meyer laugh while McHenry realizes it is a set up. Later McHenry walks through a park late at night and is approached by a man who begins to attack her. She fights him off and arrests him, bringing the man's spree of attacks to an end.

The extortionist is a partially deaf man, working with his associates Buck and Ahmad. They devise the next part of their campaign, to extort $500,000 from businessman Henry Jefferson. In disguise, they infiltrate the police protection around his mansion and plant a bomb inside. The Deaf Man telephones Jefferson and makes his demand for the money.

The detectives continue to shadow Tony, believing that he is connected to the Deaf Man. Instead they discover he is a petty criminal planning to rob a liquor store with his associate Schroeder. Carella and Kling are placed inside a back room of the store, ready to catch the robbers in the act. The cases converge when, after having planted the bomb in Jefferson's mansion, the Deaf Man and his associates stop to buy champagne at the liquor store. The robbers enter through a rear door and burst in. On seeing Buck in his police disguise, they begin shooting. Buck is shot dead, and the Deaf Man flees but is wounded by Kling as he tries to escape. Ahmad crashes their getaway car. In the car, Kling finds evidence linking them to the mansion, and the bombing is averted.

The Deaf Man flees on foot to a nearby waterfront area, only to encounter the same two youths who earlier had attacked Carella. They set him on fire, and he jumps into the river to escape. No trace of him is found. The police celebrate the conclusion to the case. As they leave, however, a hand emerges from the water and retrieves a hearing aid.

== Cast ==
- Burt Reynolds as Detective Steve Carella
- Raquel Welch as Detective Eileen McHenry
- Yul Brynner as the Deaf Man
- Tom Skerritt as Detective Bert Kling
- Jack Weston as Detective Meyer Meyer
- James McEachin as Detective Arthur Brown
- Bert Remsen as Sergeant Murchison
- Steve Ihnat as Detective Andy Parker
- Stewart Moss as Detective Hal Willis
- Peter Bonerz as Buck
- Don Gordon as Tony La Bresca
- Dan Frazer as Lieutenant Amos Byrnes
- Cal Bellini as Ahmad
- Norman Burton as Police Commissioner Nelson
- Vince Howard as Patrolman Marshall
- Albert Popwell as Lewis
- Charles Tyner as Pete
- Neile Adams as Teddy Carella
- Tamara Dobson as Rochelle
- Charles Martin Smith as "Baby"
- Robert Jaffe as Alan Parry
- Martine Bartlett as Sadie
- Brian Doyle-Murray as Detective
- Dominic Chianese as Panhandler

== Production ==
Although the 87th Precinct novels are set in a fictional metropolis based on New York City, Fuzz is set in and was shot on location in Boston, Massachusetts. The film's opening-credits sequence was filmed in and around Charlestown's City Square station on the Massachusetts Bay Transportation Authority's elevated Orange Line (demolished in 1975), as well as the Red Line as it emerges from its Cambridge tunnel to cross the Longfellow Bridge en route into Boston. Other Boston filming locations include the North End, the Boston Common and the Public Garden, where Burt Reynolds is disguised as a nun.

Reynolds recalled: "It was kind of fuzzy. It was made by one of those hot shot TV directors. I liked working with Jack Weston; it began our relationship. I did like working again with Raquel. And I liked the writer whose book the film was based on, Ed McBain, The 87th Precinct. I'd like to direct one of his books."

Welch was paid $100,000 for nine days of work. There was a scene in which Welch's character appears in her bra and panties in the men's room, but Welch initially refused to appear in it. Despite attempting alternate shoots, producer Ed Feldman said that "it just didn't work. . . . We promised United Artists we'd deliver a certain picture and we haven't got it."

Dave Grusin composed the film's soundtrack score.

== Marketing ==
Noted illustrator Richard Amsel painted the poster artwork, featuring Reynolds in a reclining pose reminiscent of his famous centerfold in Cosmopolitan magazine that appeared earlier that year.

== Critical reception ==
Roger Ebert awarded the film three stars out of four and called it "an offbeat, funny, quietly cheerful movie in which Ed McBain's 87th Precinct is finally brought to life. Several movies have been based on McBain's 87th Precinct novels, but never one in which the squad room was explored so lovingly by the camera, and the detectives were made so human."

Arthur D. Murphy of Variety praised the screenplay as "excellent" and "a rare combination of effective interlocking vignettes which logically and literately evolve towards a climax." Of the performances, Murphy wrote, "Reynolds is very good, Weston and James McEachin are excellent, and Skerritt is outstanding as the principal quartet of detectives spotlighted in the hunt for Brynner. Miss Welch's developed cameo as a sexy policewoman is a decided plus."

Gene Siskel of the Chicago Tribune awarded the film three stars out of four and wrote that it has "something for everyone: Raquel Welch and Burt Reynolds. Only a solve-three-plots-at-once ending spoils the entertainment."

Kevin Thomas of the Los Angeles Times declared the film "a solid piece of craftsmanship, well-paced and skilfully assembled," although he felt that it "could have been just as diverting had it been played less broadly and for more in-depth characterization. As it is, 'Fuzz' succeeds as a mindless entertainment."

Gary Arnold of The Washington Post called the film "a sprightly, genial take-off on the cops-and-robbers formula" as well as "the most amusing and attractive commercial vehicle I've seen since 'Play It Again, Sam,' and it recommends itself in a similar way — as an agreeable throwaway entertainment, ideally suited for summertime moviegoing."

Tony Collier of The Monthly Film Bulletin thought that "the comedy here, ladled on with a satirical fervour that invites overstatement, works in isolation, with no real interplay between it and the violence, so that the two elements coexist without ever quite managing to coalesce. Fuzz is nevertheless an intelligent and enjoyable film, and often very funny."

In a negative review for The New York Times, Vincent Canby remarked that the film "looks more like a dress rehearsal than a finished film, a very dry run for something that is apparently meant to be a comedy-melodrama about ineptitude, especially the day-to-day ineptitude of a group of detectives attached to a Boston police station."

== Controversies ==
In Boston on October 2, 1973, 24-year-old white woman Evelyn Wagler was walking to her car with a two-gallon can of gasoline. Six black teenagers dragged her into an alley and forced her to pour gasoline on herself. She complied and was then set ablaze by the teenagers, who walked away laughing. The hate crime occurred during a racially tense period in Boston. After the incident, the press reported that Fuzz had aired on nationwide television the previous weekend and that the perpetrators may have reenacted an attack portrayed in the movie. The case was never solved.

In Miami on October 20, 1973, 38-year-old Charles Scales, a homeless person sleeping outdoors behind an abandoned building, was approached by a group of teenagers, doused with gasoline and set on fire. Two other homeless people were also attacked in the same incident but escaped. A survivor stated that the teenagers "were laughing and throwing gas and striking matches" at them. The film was mentioned in news reports about the murder, as the attack closely resembled one of its scenes. This murder did not appear to have been racially motivated.

The incidents led to a careful review by network television Standards and Practices departments and a general feeling among the public that television violence was inspiring real-life acts of violence. Networks were forced to curb the amount of violence that they broadcast throughout the decade, and Fuzz was temporarily withdrawn from television broadcast until it returned to cable television years later.

== Home media ==
The film was released on Blu-ray by Kino Lorber in October 2016.

== See also ==
- List of American films of 1972
