= Company Business =

1991 film by Nicholas Meyer

- Directed by: Nicholas Meyer
- Written by: Nicholas Meyer
- Produced by: Steven-Charles Jaffe
- Starring: Gene Hackman; Mikhail Baryshnikov
- Cinematography: Gerry Fisher
- Edited by: Ronald Roose
- Music by: Michael Kamen
- Production company: Pathé Entertainment
- Distributed by: Metro-Goldwyn-Mayer (through MGM-Pathé Communications and United International Pictures)
- Release date: September 6, 1991
- Running time: 99 minutes
- Country: United States
- Language: English
- Budget: $18 million
- Box office: $1,501,785

Company Business is a 1991 American action film, written and directed by Nicholas Meyer and starring Gene Hackman and Mikhail Baryshnikov. The film follows the exploits of Sam Boyd (Gene Hackman), a former operative for the CIA who is reactivated to escort Pyotr Ivanovich Grushenko (Mikhail Baryshnikov), a captured KGB mole, to a prisoner exchange in recently reunited Berlin.

== Plot ==
With the Cold War rapidly coming to an end, retired CIA operative Sam Boyd has taken up freelancing as a corporate spy for cosmetics giant Maxine Gray, only to find that his hands-on style of espionage is being rendered obsolete by the capabilities of younger computer hackers. Boyd is suddenly called back in to the CIA by his superior, Elliot Jaffe, for a seemingly straightforward prisoner exchange with the KGB overseen by Colonel Pierce Grissom. Jaffe and Grissom explain that they have to use Boyd instead of an active agent to keep the operation off-the-books, since the $2 million that the Russian side demanded in addition to their own agent is being supplied by a Colombian drug cartel as a favor. Boyd is tasked with chaperoning Pyotr Ivanovich Grushenko, a KGB mole who had been caught and imprisoned ten years earlier, and the briefcase containing the money to Berlin, where they will both be traded for Benjamin Sobel, a U-2 pilot who was shot down over the Soviet Union during the 1960s.

A resigned Boyd and a skeptical Grushenko depart from Dulles Airport and arrive in Berlin, where they bond at a bar over Grushenko's beverage of choice, Starka. During the handover in a closed stretch of subway tunnel the next night, Boyd recognizes Sobel as a man he noticed at Dulles and calls Grushenko back, triggering a shootout with the KGB. Boyd and Grushenko are forced on the run from both the KGB and Boyd's superiors; even though Boyd told Jaffe that the handover was a setup, Grissom insists that Boyd has gone rogue and orders Jaffe to hunt him and Grushenko down. Boyd and Grushenko decide their only option is go into hiding and live off the $2 million, but they first need to launder the cash since the CIA can track the serial numbers on the bills. After securing fake IDs and credit cards and evading a police dragnet, the pair go to Faisal, a Saudi arms dealer previously used by the CIA to support anti-communist movements, to see about the money, but find that the easing of the Cold War has left him practically impoverished.

With the CIA now working with the KGB to find Boyd and Grushenko, the pair make their way to Paris, where Grushenko claims to have a girlfriend who can handle their money problem. Grushenko also reveals to Boyd that the man in the subway really was Sobel, who had been turned by the Soviets after his capture and was living in America as a sleeper agent in the guise of an economics professor. Grushenko knew Sobel because they both had the same handler, a turncoat in the US military codenamed "Donald". Boyd concludes that the cash-strapped KGB had arranged the fake handover of Sobel with Donald's help to scam the CIA out of $2 million, but the botched trade had jeopardized Donald's cover.

In Paris, Grushenko reunites with his apparent girlfriend, Natasha Grimaud, who is in reality his daughter and works at a Japanese corporation where she can wire their money to a Swiss bank account to be withdrawn as clean bills. While Grushenko travels to Switzerland to retrieve the money, the CIA/KGB kidnap Natasha to coerce Boyd and Grushenko into surrendering. Boyd concedes to their demands and chooses the Eiffel Tower as the handover site. Boyd and Grushenko manage to free Natasha and then dodge the CIA/KGB, but find the tower's exits have been cut off. The two friends duck into Le Jules Verne to share one last bottle of Starka. After Boyd suggests that they should take up residence in the Seychelles if they somehow escape, Grushenko relates that he just called Donald, implied to be Grissom, and left a false message that Sobel had been a triple-agent for the CIA all along.

== Cast ==
- Gene Hackman as Sam Boyd
- Mikhail Baryshnikov as Pyotr Ivanovich Grushenko
- Kurtwood Smith as Elliot Jaffe
- Terry O'Quinn as Col. Pierce Grissom aka "Donald"
- Daniel von Bargen as Mike Flinn
- Oleg Rudnik as Col. Grigori Golitsin
- Géraldine Danon as Natasha Grimaud
- Nadim Sawalha as Faisal
- Michael Tomlinson as Dick Maxfield
- Bob Sherman as Benjamin Sobel
- Howard McGillin as Bruce Wilson
- Louis Eppolito as Paco Gonzalez
- Adèle Anderson as Marlene
- Toby Eckholt as Nerdy Young Man
- Elsa O'Toole as Receptionist
- Kate Harper as Secretary
- Shane Rimmer as Chairman

== Production ==
=== Development ===
According to writer/director Nicholas Meyer's memoir The View from the Bridge, Meyer decided to try his hand at writing an original screenplay at the behest of then CAA co-chairman Rick Nicita. Due to the changing political environment in the Soviet Union, Meyer was forced to quickly finish his screenplay "that struggled to reflect fast-moving events in Eastern Europe, where the Berlin Wall was collapsing." As a result, the film went into preproduction before the updates could be completed and actors Gene Hackman and Mikhail Baryshnikov were signed onto the leading roles. Later, Hackman, exhausted from shooting three films back-to-back (Postcards from the Edge, Narrow Margin, and Class Action), tried to back out of filming two weeks before production was set to begin. Fearing a lawsuit from Metro-Goldwyn-Mayer, Hackman begrudgingly stayed on.

The title "Company Business" comes from the depiction in the movie of the word "company" as meaning the CIA, so "company business" means operations not to be revealed to anyone outside the CIA. The working title was Dinosaurs and the scene relating to this term was left in the finished film: a restaurant scene in which the young lady calls the two main characters "dinosaurs" meaning that CIA and KGB agents are no longer needed in the post–Cold War era. This title was dropped when it was learned that Walt Disney Studios had already registered it.

=== Filming ===
The film was produced by frequent Nicholas Meyer collaborator Steven-Charles Jaffe, who also served as second unit director. Filming took place in Berlin and Paris, as well as numerous locations in the United States.

Meyer later described his experience on Company Business, saying:

The film, which came to be known as Company Business, was a catastrophe, and it was no one's fault but mine. Going forward without a finished script was suicide. And while on paper, the troika of Hackman, Baryshnikov, and Meyer might have appeared promising, in reality we were all pulling in different directions, and my bouts with Hackman just about wrecked me. [...] There were a couple of sequences in Company Business of which I was proud, notably the tense spy swap sequence in the Berlin subway—but isolated sequences do not a good film make. A great movie is great from start to finish. Company Business, alas, did not come close.

== Reception ==
=== Box office ===
Company Business earned $533,610 over its opening weekend, playing in 232 theaters. The film grossed $1,501,785 in North America.

=== Critical response ===
Company Business was met with mixed reviews. Vincent Canby of The New York Times gave the film a lukewarm review, stating, "Mr. Hackman, who has played this role before, and Mr. Baryshnikov, who hasn't, are both sturdy if a little tired. Under the direction of Mr. Meyer, who also wrote the screenplay, the film makes sense without ever being surprising." Time Out similarly described the film as "offer[ing] familiar spy movie clichés, and although Meyer's direction creates a moderately menacing atmosphere, his script is at best undemanding, at worst simplistic."

Variety called the film a "muddled comedic-thriller" and added, "Writer-director Nicholas Meyer also is all over the map with his direction and script, which begins as a thriller (complete with portentously brooding music by Michael Kamen) then shifts to a sort of screwy comedy." Michael Wilmington of the Los Angeles Times called it "a shallow pastiche" and "a thin movie with no real center." He added:

It's a shame, because a movie with Hackman and Baryshnikov, and Kurtwood Smith and Terry O'Quinn among the villains, plus good minor roles from Nadim Sawalha (as a sweating, ruined Arab entrepreneur) and Andreas Grothusen (as an ex-Nazi forger) really should be better than this. It should have more character, grit, tension and humor.
