= Winners Take All (film) =

- Directed by: Fritz Kiersch
- Written by: Christopher W. Knight; Tom Tatum; Ed Turner
- Produced by: Christopher W. Knight; Tom Tatum
- Starring: Don Michael Paul; Kathleen York; Robert Krantz
- Cinematography: Fred V. Murphy II
- Edited by: Lorenzo De Stefano
- Music by: Doug Timm
- Release date: February 1987
- Running time: 102 mins.
- Country: United States
- Language: English

Winners Take All is a 1987 film directed by Fritz Kiersch and starring Don Michael Paul.

== Plot summary ==
Film about the sport of Supercross motorcycle racing, focusing on 2 young men who are competing.

== Cast ==
- Don Michael Paul as Rick Melon
- Kathleen York as Judy McCormick
- Robert Krantz as Billy "Bad Billy" Robinson
- Deborah Richter as Cindy Wickes
- Peter DeLuise as Wally Briskin
- Courtney Gains as "Goose" Trammel
- Paul Hampton as Frank Bushing
- Kathleen Kinmont as Party Girl #5
- Gerardo as Johnny Rivera
- Tony Longo as Bear Nolan

== Reception ==
Eleanor Ringel of The Atlanta Journal-Constitution wrote:

"The real stars of Winners Take All are the scores of anonymous stuntmen and women who ride their bikes over, under, around and through any number of astounding obstacles. Unfortunately, the filmmakers don't have the same technical expertise."
