= Our Family Honor =

American drama television series

- Created by: Lawrence Gordon; Charles Gordon; Albert Ruben
- Starring: Eli Wallach; Kenneth McMillan; Michael Madsen
- Composer: Doug Timm
- Country of origin: United States
- Original language: English
- No. of seasons: 1
- No. of episodes: 13

Production
- Running time: 60 minutes
- Production companies: Lawerence Gordon/Charles Gordon Productions; Lorimar

Original release
- Network: ABC
- Release: September 17, 1985 – January 3, 1986

Our Family Honor is an American drama television series that aired on ABC from September 17, 1985, until January 3, 1986, as part of its 1985 fall lineup.

== Series overview ==
Launched as a two-hour made-for-television movie, Our Family Honor is about two New York City families who had known each other since their childhoods and who were involved in competing "family businesses". The McKay family mostly worked for the New York City Police Department, where Patrick (Kenneth McMillan) was Commissioner, while the Danzigs were deeply involved in organized crime, with patriarch Vincent (Eli Wallach) filling the role of "godfather". Barbara Stuart played Vincent's wife, Marianne Danzig, while Michael Madsen played Vincent's cruel but inept son, Augie, who was nonetheless his heir apparent. Detective Sergeant Frank McKay (Tom Mason) was Patrick's often hot-headed son, Liz McKay (Daphne Ashbrook), Patrick's niece, was a newly graduated officer now partnered with Officer Ed Santini (Ray Liotta, in a recurring role). She was romantically involved with Vincent's other son, Jerry (Michael Woods), who wanted out of his father's business and used the name "Jerry Cole" in order to minimize any connection with his father's family. Despite the program's large budget and large, impressive cast, it was cancelled due to low ratings. The show ended with Augie dying in a gunfight with Frank, who was coming to arrest him for his involvement in the murder of Rita's lover.

== Cast and characters ==
- Daphne Ashbrook as Liz McKay
- Georgann Johnson as Katherine McKay
- Ron Karabatsos as George Bennett
- Michael Madsen as Augie Danzig
- Tom Mason as Frank McKay
- Kenneth McMillan as Patrick McKay
- Barbara Stuart as Marianne Danzig
- Eli Wallach as Vincent Danzig
- Sheree J. Wilson as Rita Danzig
- Michael Woods as Jerry "Cole" Danzig

== Episodes ==
No.	Title	Directed by	Written by	Original release date
1 2	"Pilot"	Robert Butler	Story by : John Tanner; Teleplay by : John Tanner and Arthur Bernard Lewis & Richard Freiman	September 17, 1985
Two New York families, the McKays on the side of the law and the Danzigs heading a crime empire. Find their lives entwined
3	"Everybody is a Star"	Guy Magar	Richard Freiman	September 24, 1985
4	"In the Line of Duty"	Martin Davidson	Josef Anderson	October 1, 1985
5	"Runaway Movie Queen"	Guy Magar	Joseph Gunn	October 8, 1985
6	"Cat and Mouse"	Martin Davidson	Nancy Miller	October 15, 1985
7	"The Hostage"	Charles Correll	Joseph Gunn	November 8, 1985
8	"Homecoming"	Michael Lange	Howard Lakin	November 15, 1985
9	"The Casino"	Martin Davidson	Richard Freiman	November 22, 1985
10	"Mark of Cain"	Jerry Jameson	Leonard Katzman	November 29, 1985
11	"Lone Justice"	Martin Davidson	Howard Lakin	December 6, 1985
12	"End of the Line"	Jerry Jameson	Story by : Ron Frazier; Teleplay by : Peter Lefcourt & Richard Freiman	December 13, 1985
13	"Crimes of Passion – Part 1"	John Patterson	Story by : Peter Lefcourt; Teleplay by : Peter Lefcourt & Richard Freiman	December 27, 1985
14	"Crimes of Passion – Part 2"	John Patterson	Story by : Peter Lefcourt; Teleplay by : Peter Lefcourt & Richard Freiman	January 3, 1986

== Ratings ==
No.	Title	Air Date	Time	Rank	Rating	Viewers (Millions)
1	Pilot	September 17, 1985	Tuesday at 9:00 P.M.	#23 of 58	15.4	13.2
2	Everybody is a Star	September 24, 1985	Tuesday at 10:00 P.M.	##51 of 64	11.7	10.5
3	In the Line of Duty	October 1, 1985	Tuesday at 10:00 P.M.	#62 of 69	9.8	8.4
4	Runaway Movie Queen	October 8, 1985	Tuesday at 10:00 P.M.	#56 of 63	12.1	10.4
5	Cat and Mouse	October 15, 1985	Tuesday at 10:00 P.M.	#63 of 67	10.1	8.7
6	The Hostage	November 8, 1985	Friday at 10:00 P.M.	#68 of 68	6.4	5.5
7	Homecoming	November 15, 1985	Friday at 10:00 P.M.	#68 of 68	6.4	5.5
8	The Casino	November 22, 1985	Friday at 10:00 P.M.	#61 of 61	5.6	4.8
9	Mark of Chain	November 29, 1985	Friday at 10:00 P.M.	#68 of 68	5.7	4.9
10	Lone Justice	December 6, 1985	Friday at 10:00 P.M.	#72 of 72	4.8	4.1
11	End of the Line	December 13, 1985	Friday at 10:00 P.M.	#70 of 71	5.5	4.7
12	Crimes of Passion, Part 1	December 27, 1985	Friday at 10:00 P.M.	#61 of 67	9.8	5.7
13	Crimes of Passion, Part 2	January 3, 1986	Friday at 10:00 P.M.	#63 of 64	5.4	4.6

Source: A.C. Nielsen Company via Los Angeles Times
