= Shelly Johnson (cinematographer) =

American cinematographer

- Born: April 28, 1960 (age 66); Santa Rosa, California, United States
- Education: Art Center College of Design
- Occupation: Cinematographer
- Years active: 1980–present

Shelly Johnson (born April 28, 1960) is an American cinematographer, known for his collaboration with director Joe Johnston.

Johnson has been a member of the American Society of Cinematographers since 2000, and in 2023, he was elected President of the Society.

== Early life and education ==
Johnson grew up in Pasadena, California, where he attended at the Blair High School and graduated at Pasadena's Art Center College of Design in 1980.

== Filmography ==
=== Film ===
Year	Title	Director	Notes
1987	Maid to Order	Amy Holden Jones	
1987	Nightflyers	Robert Collector	
1988	Jack's Back	Rowdy Herrington	
1991	Teenage Mutant Ninja Turtles II: The Secret of the Ooze	Michael Pressman	
1992	Judgement	William Sachs	With Kelly Johnson
2001	Jurassic Park III	Joe Johnston	
2001	The Last Castle	Rod Lurie	
2004	Hidalgo	Joe Johnston	
2005	Sky High	Mike Mitchell	
2008	The House Bunny	Fred Wolf	
2010	The Wolfman	Joe Johnston	
2011	The Big Bang	Tony Krantz	
2011	Captain America: The First Avenger	Joe Johnston	
2012	The Expendables 2	Simon West	
2013	Percy Jackson: Sea of Monsters	Thor Freudenthal	
2015	Wild Card	Simon West	
2015	Man Down	Dito Montiel	
2016	A Family Man	Mark Williams	
2018	The Hurricane Heist	Rob Cohen	
2018	Welcome Home	George Ratliff	
2019	The Lego Movie 2: The Second Part	Mike Mitchell	Live-action scenes only
2020	Greyhound	Aaron Schneider	
2020	Bill & Ted Face the Music	Dean Parisot	
2020	Honest Thief	Mark Williams	
2022	Blacklight	Mark Williams	
2024	Aftermath	Patrick Lussier	
2024	Elevation	George Nolfi	
2027	Greyhound 2 †	Aaron Schneider	

=== Television ===
Year	Title	Director	Notes
1990	CBS Schoolbreak Special	Mario Van Peebles	Episode "Malcolm Takes a Shot"
1990	Tales from the Crypt	Rowdy Herrington	Episode "Korman's Kalamity"
1995	Charlie Grace	Robert Singer	Episode "Pilot"
1999	Turks	Robert Singer; Chris Long; Philip Sgriccia	8 episodes
2000	The Others		All 13 episodes
2014	Chasing Life	Steve Miner	Episode "Pilot"
2015	Blood & Oil	Jonas Pate	Episode "Pilot"
2016	Falling Water	Juan Carlos Fresnadillo	Episode "Don't Tell Bill"
2017	Training Day	Danny Cannon	Episode "Apocalypse Now"
2024	Call Me Ted	Keith R. Clarke	Documentary series

Miniseries

Year	Title	Director
1993	The Fire Next Time	Tom McLoughlin
1997	The Shining	Mick Garris
2022	Boundless	Simon West
