= The Lords of Discipline (film) =

1983 film by Franc Roddam

- Directed by: Franc Roddam
- Written by: Lloyd Fonvielle; Thomas Pope
- Based on: The Lords of Discipline (novel by Pat Conroy)
- Produced by: Herb Jaffe; Gabriel Katzka
- Starring: David Keith; Robert Prosky; G. D. Spradlin
- Cinematography: Brian Tufano
- Edited by: Michael Ellis
- Music by: Howard Blake
- Distributed by: Paramount Pictures
- Release date: February 18, 1983
- Running time: 103 minutes
- Country: United States
- Language: English
- Budget: $8.5 million
- Box office: $11,787,127

The Lords of Discipline is a 1983 American film based on the 1980 novel by Pat Conroy and directed by Franc Roddam. The story is about a military academy and a secret society within it.

The film stars David Keith, Robert Prosky, Judge Reinhold, Bill Paxton, William Hope, Michael Biehn, and Olympic boxer Mark Breland. The college scenes were filmed primarily at Wellington College in Crowthorne, Berkshire, England, as none of the American military academies would allow filming on their grounds because of the book's less-than-positive portrayal of life at a military academy.

== Plot ==
Will McLean is a senior cadet at the Carolina Military Institute, a school that outwardly promises to produce men of honor but practices brutal hazing against its knobs (freshman cadets). Among these knobs are the overweight Poteete and the institute's first black cadet, Tom Pearce. McLean's mentor, Lt. Col. "Bear" Berrineau, asks him to protect Pearce. McLean's roommates at the Institute are Dante "Pig" Pignetti, Mark Santoro and Tradd St. Croix, the last of whom offers him a key to his parents' house.

As the term begins, McLean's roommates participate in breaking in the new cadets, while McLean remains aloof. This draws the attention of the school's commanding officer, Lt. Gen. Bentley Durrell, who warns him not to be soft.

Both Poteete and Pearce become targets of the Ten, a traditional clandestine group of seniors dedicated to ridding the school of "unfit" cadets. Poteete is left standing all night on a high ledge, from which McLean is unable to save him from falling the next morning. Pearce is attacked and has the number 10 carved in his back. In addition, Pearce had razor blades placed in his athletic shoes, and suffers multiple, small lacerations. McLean's attempts to protect him are thwarted when someone intercepts their communications.

Together with his roommates, McLean kidnaps Dan McIntyre, a former member of the Ten, and forces him to disclose the location of the Hole, the place where they take cadets to be tortured. McLean and his friends arrive at the Hole just as Pearce is threatened with immolation. They distract the Ten, and McLean unmasks one of them: John Alexander.

The Ten retaliate by having Pignetti charged with theft and expelled by an Honor Court that they control. Alexander issues a large number of demerits against the rest of McLean's faction, placing them also at risk of expulsion. McLean offers to resign if Alexander will show leniency towards Santoro and Tradd, which Alexander accepts. Before he can submit his resignation, McLean sees McIntyre on campus meeting with Bear and Tradd's father. He enters the St. Croix house and discovers the history of the Ten from Mr. St. Croix's journals, in that Mr. St. Croix was himself a member. Not only have the Ten been operating for years, but Durrell (himself a past member of The Ten) supports their activities. Most shockingly, Tradd is a member and has kept them ahead of McLean at every step. McLean confronts Tradd and throws the house key at him.

McLean returns to the Institute and marches into Durrell's office. He demands that the senior class, with Pignetti reinstated, be allowed to graduate; that the Ten be disbanded and exposed; and that Durrell resign at the end of the year. If Durrell does not agree, the journals will be sent to the press. Durrell accepts the terms for the sake of the institute. McLean remains at CMI until graduation day to see the deal through, but he remains disgusted by the corruption and chooses not to attend the graduation ceremony. As he walks out the gates of the institute, Bear hands him his class ring, telling him that he earned it.

== Cast ==
- David Keith as Cadet Senior Private Will McLean
- Robert Prosky as Lieutenant Colonel "Bear" Berrineau
- G. D. Spradlin as Lieutenant General Bentley Durrell
- Barbara Babcock as Abigail St. Croix
- Michael Biehn as Cadet Lieutenant Colonel John Alexander
- Rick Rossovich as Cadet First Lieutenant Dante Pignetti
- John Lavachielli as Cadet Senior Private Mark Santoro
- Mitchell Lichtenstein as Cadet First Lieutenant Tradd St. Croix
- Mark Breland as Tom Pearce
- Malcolm Danare as Poteete
- Judge Reinhold as Cadet First Sergeant Macabbee
- Bill Paxton as Cadet Major Gilbreath (credited as "Wild Bill" Paxton)
- Ed Bishop as Commerce St. Croix
- Stuart Milligan as McIntyre
- Jason Connery as MacKinnon
- Michael Horton as Bobby Bentley
- Sarah Brackett as Mrs. Durrell
- Richard Oldfield as TAC Officer
- Matt Frewer as Senior
- William Hope as Senior
- Mary Ellen Ray as Mrs Bear

== Reception ==
On the review aggregator website Rotten Tomatoes, 40% of 10 critics' reviews are positive.
