= Robert Jaffe (producer) =

American producer, actor, and screenwriter

- Born: New York City, New York, U.S.
- Occupation: Film producer
- Relatives: Steven-Charles Jaffe (brother)

Robert Jaffe (born in New York City) is an American film producer, actor, and screenwriter. He is known for his work on Motel Hell (1980), Nightflyers (1987), Nightflyers (2018), and more. He also appeared in the films Fuzz (1972), The Magnificent Seven Ride! (1972), and Creature (1985).

== Career ==
As an actor he played Alan Parry in Fuzz (1972), Bob Allen in The Magnificent Seven Ride! (1972), Jon Fennel in Creature (1985), and Miles in Maid to Order (1987). He also had small roles in The Mechanic (1972) and Honey, I Blew Up the Kid (1992).

He produced Motel Hell (1980), Nightflyers (1987), Gahan Wilson: Born Dead, Still Weird (2013), and the television series of Nightflyers (2018).

As a screenwriter, his credits include Demon Seed (1977), Motel Hell (1980), Scarab (1980), and Nightflyers (1987).

He and his father, Herb Jaffe, bought the rights to Nightflyers from George R.R. Martin in 1984.

== Personal life ==
He married Nina Axelrod in 1981, and they have since divorced. He graduated from the University of Southern California as a cinema major. He is the son of Herb Jaffe, brother of Steven-Charles Jaffe, and father of Taliesin Jaffe.
