= Barry Keith Grant =

Canadian-American critic

- Occupations: Critic; educator; author; editor
- Awards: Fellow of the Royal Society of Canada (2010); Distinguished Academic Award, Canadian Association of University Teachers (2010); Society of Cinema and Media Studies Pedagogy Award (2009)

Academic background
- Education: State University of New York at Buffalo (PhD, 1975)

Academic work
- Discipline: Film studies
- Institutions: Brock University (1975–2016)

Barry Keith Grant is a Canadian-American critic, educator, author and editor who best known for his work on science fiction film and literature, horror films, musicals and popular music and other genres of popular cinema.

An Elected Fellow of the Royal Society of Canada, Grant has authored or edited more than two dozen books on these subjects, several of which have become standard course texts on film studies. His essays have appeared in dozens of journals, magazines, and scholarly anthologies, and his work his been translated into several languages. He has also been a featured critic on CBC radio. Grant is recognized as one of the leading experts on the work of American documentary filmmaker Frederick Wiseman.

== Career ==
Grant earned his Ph.D. from the State University of New York at Buffalo in American literature and film studies in 1975. From 1975-2016 he taught at Brock University in St. Catharines, Ontario, Canada, where he helped develop the undergraduate program in film studies, one of the first in Canada, as well as the country's only graduate program in popular culture. He served as the founding director of that program from 2002-2004 and before that as the founding chair of the interdisciplinary Department of Fine Arts from 1981-1984. In 2007 he was Visiting Fellow at the University of Otago in Dunedin, New Zealand.

Since 1995 Grant has served as editor of the Contemporary Approaches to Film and Media series for Wayne State University Press, which also includes the innovative "TV Milestones" series. Grant was also the editor of the New Approaches to Film and Media series, originally with Cambridge University Press and then published by Wiley-Blackwell. He has or is currently serving on the editorial boards or advisory editorial boards of Cinema Journal, Literature/Film Quarterly, Canadian Journal of Film Studies, Science Fiction Studies, and Science Fiction Film and Television. Grant was Editor-in-Chief of the four-volume Schirmer Encyclopedia of Film (Thomson-Gale, 2006), an award-winning reference work involving contributions from 100 scholars around the world.

Grant is the recipient of the Distinguished Academic Award from the Canadian Association of University Teachers in 2010 and the Society of Cinema and Media Studies Pedagogy Award in 2009. He was the first Canadian film studies scholar to be elected a Fellow of the Royal Society of Canada in 2010.

== Bibliography ==
=== Books ===
- Voyages of Discovery: The Cinema of Frederick Wiseman. Urbana and Chicago: University of Illinois Press, 1992.
- The Film Studies Dictionary (with Steve Blandford and Jim Hillier). London, UK: Arnold/ New York: Oxford, 2001. Japanese Translation: Tokyo: Film Art-sha, 2003.
- Film Genre: From Iconography to Ideology. London and New York: Wallflower Press, 2007.
- 100 Documentary Films (with Jim Hillier). London: British Film Institute, 2009.
- Invasion of the Body Snatchers. London: British Film Institute/ Palgrave Macmillan, 2010.
- Shadows of Doubt: Negotiations of Masculinity in American Genre Films. Detroit: Wayne State University Press, 2011.
- The Hollywood Film Musical. Malden, MA: Blackwell, 2012.
- 100 Science Fiction Films. London: British Film Institute/ Palgrave Macmillan, 2013.
- Monster Cinema. New Brunswick, NJ: Rutgers University Press, 2018.
- The Twilight Zone. Detroit: Wayne State University Press, 2020.
- 100 American Horror Films. London: British Film Institute/ Bloomsbury, 2021.
- Voyages of Discovery: The Cinema of Frederick Wiseman, revised and expanded edition. New York: Columbia University Press/ Wallflower Press, 2023.
- Film Genre: The Basics. London and New York: Routledge, 2023

=== Books edited ===
- Grant, Barry Keith, ed. Film Genre: Theory and Criticism. Metuchen, NJ: Scarecrow Press, 1977.
- Grant, Barry Keith, ed. Film Study in the Undergraduate Curriculum. New York: Modern Language Association, 1983.
- Grant, Barry Keith, ed. Planks of Reason: Essays on the Horror Film. Metuchen, NJ: Scarecrow Press, 1984. 428 pp.
- Grant, Barry Keith, ed. Film Genre Reader. Austin: University of Texas Press, 1986.
- Grant, Barry Keith, ed. Film Genre Reader II. Austin: University of Texas Press, 1995.
- Grant, Barry Keith, ed. The Dread of Difference: Gender and the Horror Film. Austin: University of Texas Press, 1996.
- Grant, Barry Keith and Jeannette Sloniowski, eds. Documenting the Documentary: Close Readings of Documentary Film and Video. Detroit: Wayne State University Press, 1998.
- Grant, Barry Keith, ed. John Ford's Stagecoach. New York and Cambridge: Cambridge University Press, 2002.
- Grant, Barry Keith, ed. Fritz Lang: Interviews. Jackson: University Press of Mississippi, 2003.
- Grant, Barry Keith, ed. Film Genre Reader III. Austin: University of Texas Press, 2003.
- Grant, Barry Keith, and Christopher Sharrett, eds. Planks of Reason: Essays on the Horror Film, revised ed. Lanham, MD: Scarecrow Press, 2004.
- Grant, Barry Keith, ed. Five Films by Frederick Wiseman. Berkeley and Los Angeles: University of California Press, 2006.
- Grant, Barry Keith, Editor-in-Chief. Schirmer Encyclopedia of Film, 4 vols. Detroit and New York: Thomson Gale, 2006.
- Grant, Barry Keith, ed. Auteurs and Authorship: A Film Reader. Malden, MA: Blackwell Publishing, 2007.
- Grant, Barry Keith, ed. American Cinema and the 1960s: Themes and Variations (Screen Decades series). New Brunswick: Rutgers University Press, 2008.
- Grant, Barry Keith, ed. The Collected Film Criticism of Andrew Britton. Detroit: Wayne State University Press, 2009.
- Nicks, Joan, and Barry Keith Grant, eds. Covering Niagara: Popular Culture and the Local. Waterloo, ON: Wilfrid Laurier University Press, 2010.
- Fox, Alistair, Barry Keith Grant, and Hilary Radner, eds. New Zealand Cinema: Interpreting the Past. Bristol, UK: Intellect, 2011.
- Grant, Barry Keith, ed. Film Genre Reader IV. Austin: University of Texas Press, 2012. Wood, Robin. Ingmar Bergman, expanded edition, ed. Barry Keith Grant. Detroit: Wayne State University Press, 2012.
- Grant, Barry Keith, and Jeannette Sloniowski, eds. Documenting the Documentary: Close Readings of Documentary Film and Video, 2nd ed. Detroit: Wayne State University Press, 2014.
- Wood, Robin. Arthur Penn, expanded edition, ed. Barry Keith Grant. Detroit: Wayne State University Press, 2014.
- Grant, Barry Keith, ed. The Dread of Difference: Gender and the Horror Film, 2nd edition. Austin: University of Texas Press, 2015.
- Grant, Barry Keith, and Malisa Kurtz, eds. Notions of Genre: Writings on Popular Film before Genre Theory. Austin: University of Texas Press, 2016.
- Wood, Robin. The Apu Trilogy, expanded edition, ed. Barry Keith Grant. Detroit: Wayne State University Press, 2016.
- Wood, Robin. Robin Wood on the Horror Film, ed. Barry Keith Grant. Detroit: Wayne State University Press, 2018.
- Grant, Barry Keith, and Scott Henderson, eds. Comics and Popular Culture: Adaptation from Panel to Frame. Austin: University of Texas Press, 2019.
- Grant, Barry Keith, ed. Ken Russell Interviews. Jackson: University Press of Mississippi, 2024.
