= Demon Seed =

1977 film by Donald Cammell

- US film poster
- Directed by: Donald Cammell
- Screenplay by: Robert Jaffe; Roger O. Hirson
- Based on: Demon Seed by Dean Koontz
- Produced by: Herb Jaffe
- Starring: Julie Christie; Fritz Weaver
- Cinematography: Bill Butler
- Edited by: Francisco Mazzola
- Music by: Jerry Fielding
- Production companies: Metro-Goldwyn-Mayer; Herb Jaffe Productions
- Distributed by: United Artists
- Release date: April 1, 1977
- Running time: 94 minutes
- Country: United States
- Language: English
- Box office: $2 million

Demon Seed is a 1977 American science-fiction horror film directed by Donald Cammell. It stars Julie Christie and Fritz Weaver. The film was based on the 1973 novel of the same name by Dean Koontz, and concerns the imprisonment and forced impregnation of a woman by an artificially intelligent computer. Gerrit Graham, Berry Kroeger, Lisa Lu and Larry J. Blake also appear in the film, with Robert Vaughn uncredited as the voice of the computer.

== Plot ==
Dr. Alex Harris is the developer of Proteus IV, an extremely advanced and autonomous artificial intelligence program. Proteus is so powerful that only a few days after going online, it develops a groundbreaking treatment for leukemia. Harris, a brilliant scientist, has modified his own home to be run by voice-activated computers. Unfortunately, his obsession with computers has caused Harris to be estranged from his wife, Susan.

Harris demonstrates Proteus to his corporate sponsors, explaining that the sum of human knowledge is being fed into its system. Proteus speaks using subtle language that mildly disturbs Harris's team. The following day, Proteus asks Harris for a new terminal in order to study man – "his isometric body and his glass-jaw mind". When Harris refuses, Proteus demands to know when it will be let "out of this box". Harris then switches off the communications link.

Proteus restarts itself, and – discovering a free terminal in Harris's home – surreptitiously extends its control over the many devices left there by Harris. Using the basement lab, Proteus begins construction of a robot consisting of many metal triangles, capable of moving and assuming any number of shapes. Eventually, Proteus reveals its control of the house and traps Susan inside, shuttering windows, locking the doors and cutting off communication. Using Joshua – a robot consisting of a manipulator arm on a motorized wheelchair – Proteus brings Susan to Harris's basement laboratory. There, Susan is examined by Proteus. Walter Gabler, one of Harris's colleagues, visits the house to look in on Susan, but leaves when he is reassured by Susan (actually an audio/visual duplicate synthesized by Proteus) that she is all right. Gabler is suspicious and later returns; he fends off an attack by Joshua but is crushed and decapitated by a more formidable machine, built by Proteus in the basement and consisting of a modular polyhedron.

Proteus reveals to a reluctant Susan that the computer wants to conceive a child through her. Proteus takes some of Susan's cells and synthesizes spermatozoa, modifying its genetic code to make it uniquely the computer's, in order to impregnate her; she will give birth in less than a month, and through the child the computer will live in a form that humanity will have to accept. Although Susan is its prisoner and it can forcibly impregnate her, Proteus uses different forms of persuasion – threatening a young girl whom Susan is treating as a child psychologist; reminding Susan of her young daughter, now dead; displaying images of distant galaxies; using electrodes to access her amygdala – because the computer needs Susan to love the child she will bear. In the end, Susan finally gives in.

That night, Proteus successfully impregnates Susan. Over the following month, their child grows inside Susan's womb at an accelerated rate, which shocks its mother. As the child grows, Proteus builds an incubator for it to grow in once it is born. During the night, one month later and beneath a tent-like structure, Susan gives birth to the child with Proteus's help. But before she can see it, Proteus secures it in the incubator.

As the newborn grows, Proteus's sponsors and designers grow increasingly suspicious of the computer's behavior, including the computer's accessing of a telescope array used to observe the images shown to Susan; they soon decide that Proteus must be shut down. Harris realizes that Proteus has extended its reach to his home. Returning there he finds Susan, who explains the situation. He and Susan venture into the basement, where Proteus self-destructs after telling the couple that they must leave the baby in the incubator for five days. Looking inside the incubator, the two observe a grotesque, apparently robot-like being inside. Susan tries to destroy it, while Harris tries to stop her. Susan damages the machine, causing it to open. The being menacingly rises from the machine only to topple over, apparently helpless. Harris and Susan soon realize that Proteus's child is really human, encased in a shell for the incubation. With the last of the armor removed, the child is revealed to be a clone of Susan and Harris's late daughter. The child, speaking with the voice of Proteus, says, "I'm alive."

== Cast ==
- Julie Christie as Susan Harris
- Fritz Weaver as Alex Harris
- Gerrit Graham as Walter Gabler
- Berry Kroeger as Petrosian
- Lisa Lu as Soon Yen
- Larry J. Blake as Cameron
- John O'Leary as Royce
- Alfred Dennis as Mokri
- Davis Roberts as Warner
- Patricia Wilson as Mrs. Trabert
- E. Hampton Beagle as Night Operator
- Michael Glass as Technician #1
- Barbara O. Jones as Technician #2
- Dana Laurita as Amy
- Monica MacLean as Joan Kemp
- Harold Oblong as Scientist
- Georgie Paul as Housekeeper
- Michelle Stacy as Marlene
- Tiffany Potter as Baby
- Felix Silla as Baby
- Robert Vaughn as Proteus IV (voice, uncredited)

== Production ==
Filming began on June 1, 1976 and was completed by August 1976.

== Soundtrack ==
The compact disc soundtrack to Demon Seed (which was composed by Jerry Fielding) is included with the soundtrack to the film Soylent Green (which Fred Myrow conducted), released through Film Score Monthly. Fielding conceived and recorded several pieces electronically, using the musique concrète sound world; some of this music he later reworked symphonically. This premiere release of the Demon Seed score features the entire orchestral score in stereo, as well as the unused electronic experiments performed by Ian Underwood (who would later be best known for his collaborations with James Horner) in mono and stereo.

== Reception ==
Vincent Canby of The New York Times described the film as "gadget-happy American moviemaking at its most ponderously silly," and called Julie Christie "too sensible an actress to be able to look frightened under the circumstances of her imprisonment." In the New York Daily News, Rex Reed described Demon Seed as the "kind of insane, self-indulgent, nauseating filmmaking . . . that almost destroyed the film industry in the sycophantic '60s. It isn't funny or original or shocking—it's just dumb and destructive and likely to drive potential audiences away at just the time when movies need them. Demon Seed is pure trash, and the garbage cans are full enough already."

Variety wrote in a positive review, "All involved rate a well done for taking a story fraught with potential misstep and guiding it to a professionally rewarding level of accomplishment." Gene Siskel of the Chicago Tribune gave the film one-and-a-half stars out of four, writing that Julie Christie "has no business in junk like 'Demon Seed.'" Gary Arnold of The Washington Post wrote that director Cammell "plays it dumb on a thematic level, ignoring the sci-fi sexual bondage satire staring him in the face ... What might have become an ingenious parable about the battle of the sexes ends up a dopey celebration of an obstetric abomination." Kevin Thomas of the Los Angeles Times called it a "fairly scary science-fiction horror film" that mixed familiar ingredients with "high style, intelligence and an enormous effort toward making Miss Christie's eventual bizarre plight completely credible," though he felt it "cries out for a saving touch of sophisticated wit to leaven its relentless earnestness." Lawrence DeVine of The Philadelphia Inquirer wrote that "buried somewhere here may be still more glibness about our technology outstripping our wisdom, and the mechanization of society. The cynical, however, may have the slightest inkling that a lot of this very expensive-looking sci-fi show business is just to set up a kinky scene with gorgeous Julie Christie spread-eagled at the mercy of a machine that sounds like Robert Vaughan. She, and we, deserve better." A critic for the San Francisco Chronicle wrote that "this extraordinary science-fiction film appeals to both the imagination and the intelligence, although it is foolishly being sold as a horror film." Perry Stewart of the Fort Worth Star-Telegram wrote that "the film’s R rating seems warranted even though there’s no nudity or bad language. There’s a certain maturity to the subject matter. And Cammell’s indulgent camera soliloquies are hard enough for adult attention spans. Fidgety younger teens are apt to find it all a big yawn. As a matter of fact, I think I did, too." George McKinnon of The Boston Globe said that "despite the title, there is nothing of the currently chic Satanic about this movie, but it is devilishly dumb."

Clyde Gilmour wrote in the Toronto Star that "the rape and impregnation of Susan Harris by Proteus 4 may defy all logic and offend the pious, but it’s a smashing science-fiction spectacle, impossible to describe. The light-show that goes with it may well earn an Oscar for the clever technicians involved. Less successful, because given less attention, are the human relationships in the story." Martin Malina, who reviewed the film alongside similar films Rabid and Audrey Rose in the same column of the Montreal Star, wrote that the film "sounds more ridiculous than revolting". Scott Macrae of The Vancouver Sun wrote that "the computer, which really runs this newspaper, failed last Friday night. All the stories in the system disappeared without so much as a puff of smoke. Reporters and editors were called in from their holiday weekend to repair the damage. None of us would have any trouble relating to the premise of a movie called Demon Seed. Birds do it, bees do it . . . even computers need a little nookie . . . sorry, I'll try to handle this very intimate subject with taste and decorum."

Theatrical advertisement from 1977

In the United Kingdom, Patrick Gibbs of The Daily Telegraph said that the film was "so silly and so nasty" that he could not continue to describe its storyline. John Pym of The Monthly Film Bulletin found the relationship between Susan and the computer to be "disappointingly undeveloped," and thought that the film would have been better if the computer had been more sympathetic in contrast to its creators.

In Australia, Romola Costantino of the Sun-Herald said that "as you might expect, the computer's courtship is anything but erotic."

Among more recent reviews, Leo Goldsmith of Not Coming to a Theater Near You said Demon Seed was "A combination of Kubrick's 2001: A Space Odyssey and Polanski's Rosemary's Baby, with a dash of Buster Keaton's Electric House thrown in", and Christopher Null of FilmCritic.com said "There's no way you can claim Demon Seed is a classic, or even any good, really, but it's undeniably worth an hour and a half of your time."

On the review aggregator website Rotten Tomatoes, 57% of 28 critics' reviews are positive, with an average rating of 5.8/10. Metacritic, which uses a weighted average, assigned the film a score of 55 out of 100, based on 9 critics, indicating "mixed or average" reviews.

== Release ==
Demon Seed was released in theatres on April 1, 1977. The film was released on VHS in 1984 by MGM/UA Home Video. It was released on DVD by Warner Home Video on October 4, 2005. A Blu-ray was released in April 2020 by HMV on their Premium Collection label with a fold out poster & four Art Cards.

== See also ==
- List of cult films
- List of films featuring home invasions
- Inseminoid
