= Who'll Stop the Rain =

1978 film by Karel Reisz

- Theatrical release poster by Tom Jung
- Directed by: Karel Reisz
- Screenplay by: Judith Rascoe; Robert Stone
- Based on: Dog Soldiers by Robert Stone
- Produced by: Herb Jaffe; Gabriel Katzka
- Starring: Nick Nolte; Tuesday Weld; Michael Moriarty; Anthony Zerbe
- Cinematography: Richard H. Kline
- Edited by: John Bloom
- Music by: Laurence Rosenthal
- Production company: Katzka-Jaffe
- Distributed by: United Artists
- Release date: August 11, 1978
- Running time: 126 minutes
- Country: United States
- Language: English
- Budget: $5.5 million

Who'll Stop the Rain is a 1978 American neo-noir thriller crime drama film directed by Karel Reisz and starring Nick Nolte, Tuesday Weld, Michael Moriarty, and Anthony Zerbe. It was released by United Artists and produced by Herb Jaffe and Gabriel Katzka with Sheldon Schrager and Roger Spottiswoode as executive producers. The screenplay is by Judith Rascoe and Robert Stone, based on Stone's novel Dog Soldiers (1974), the music score by Laurence Rosenthal, and the cinematography by Richard H. Kline. The movie was entered in the 1978 Cannes Film Festival.

== Plot ==
The film opens in Saigon late in the Vietnam War.

John Converse, a disillusioned war correspondent, approaches Ray Hicks, a merchant marine sailor and acquaintance of Converse from the U.S., for help in smuggling a large quantity of heroin from Vietnam to San Francisco, where he will exchange the drugs for payment with Converse's wife Marge, who has become addicted to Dilaudid.

When Hicks gets back to the U.S. and discovers he is being followed by thugs connected either to Converse or his suppliers, he goes on the run with Marge and the heroin, and eventually they are pursued by corrupt DEA Agent Antheil, who initially set the deal in motion. As Marge is separated from her supply of Dilaudid, she experiences withdrawal, and Hicks decides to help wean her off her addiction by using the heroin. Hicks also attempts to find another buyer for the heroin before his pursuers can catch up to him.

Antheil trails Hicks to El Ojo Grande Mountain in New Mexico, where Hicks has a safehouse. In the ensuing shoot out, Hicks is shot in the shoulder, but Converse and Marge escape. Converse and Marge drive to the arranged rendezvous but Hicks has already died from his wounds. After burying Hicks, Converse pours out the heroin, reinforcing the theme that it was not about the drugs or the money, but the bond of loyalty between "buddies" or comrades of war.

As Antheil inspects the heroin on the ground, it is assumed that he is shot by one of his henchmen. Meanwhile Converse and Marge use Hicks' vehicle to escape towards Mexico.

== Cast ==
- Nick Nolte as Ray Hicks
- Tuesday Weld as Marge Converse
- Michael Moriarty as John Converse
- Anthony Zerbe as Antheil
- Richard Masur as Danskin
- Ray Sharkey as Smitty
- Gail Strickland as Charmian
- Charles Haid as Eddie Peace
- David Opatoshu as Bender
- James Cranna as Gerald
- Timothy Blake as Jody
- Joaquín Martínez as Angel (as Joaquin Martinez)

== Background and production ==
The film is based on Robert Stone's novel Dog Soldiers (1974), which won the National Book Award (US) for fiction in 1975. For its original US theatrical release it was re-titled Who'll Stop the Rain, after the Creedence Clearwater Revival song, which features prominently (along with several other popular CCR tracks) on the film's soundtrack. The film was released as Dog Soldiers in several places. Some copies of the DVD of Who'll Stop the Rain contain prints titled Dog Soldiers.

Stone based the character of Ray Hicks on Beat writer Neal Cassady, with whom Stone became acquainted through novelist Ken Kesey, a graduate school classmate of Stone's at Stanford University.

Hicks' death scene on the railroad tracks at the film's conclusion is directly based on Cassady's death along a railroad track outside of San Miguel de Allende, Mexico, in 1968. The hippie commune setting, where lights and stereo speakers placed throughout the woods are utilized in Hicks' escape plan, is partially based on Kesey's home in La Honda, California, where Kesey and his friends — known as the Merry Pranksters — famously wired the surrounding woods with lights and sound equipment to enhance their experiments with LSD.

The Saigon scenes were filmed on a set in Mexico.

== Reception ==
Pauline Kael, critic for The New Yorker, wrote that showings were controversial with cries from the audience during the brutal fight scene of "O.K. enough! and applause for the cries."

On the review aggregator website Rotten Tomatoes, 81% of 16 critics' reviews are positive.

=== Awards ===
- Nominee, Palme d'Or Cannes Film Festival (Karel Reisz)
- Nominee, Best Actor National Society of Film Critics (Nick Nolte)
- Nominee, Best Adapted Drama Writers Guild of America (Judith Rascoe, Robert Stone)

== Soundtrack ==
- Del Reeves – "Philadelphia Fillies"
- Jackie DeShannon – "Put a Little Love in Your Heart"
- Don McLean – "American Pie"
- Slim Whitman – "I'll Step Down"
- Creedence Clearwater Revival – "Hey Tonight"
- Creedence Clearwater Revival – "Who'll Stop the Rain"
- Creedence Clearwater Revival – "Proud Mary"
- The Spencer Davis Group – "Gimme Some Lovin'"
- Hank Snow – "Golden Rocket"
