= Those Lips, Those Eyes =

1980 film by Michael Pressman

- Theatrical release poster
- Directed by: Michael Pressman
- Written by: David Shaber
- Produced by: Herb Jaffe; Steven-Charles Jaffe; Michael Pressman; Edward A. Teets
- Starring: Frank Langella; Glynnis O'Connor; Tom Hulce
- Cinematography: Bobby Byrne
- Edited by: Millie Moore
- Music by: Michael Small
- Distributed by: United Artists
- Release date: August 15, 1980
- Running time: 105 minutes
- Country: United States
- Language: English
- Box office: $804,713

Those Lips, Those Eyes is a 1980 American romance film directed by Michael Pressman and starring Frank Langella, Glynnis O'Connor, and Tom Hulce.

== Plot ==
In the early 1950s, a star-struck Ohio boy, Artie Shoemaker, skips school to work behind the scenes for a touring stock theatrical company.

Inept at his job, Artie is nearly fired until the star of the show, Harry Crystal, takes a liking to him and takes the kid under his wing. Artie becomes smitten with one of the attractive chorus girls from the show, Ramona, a worldly young woman who provides his sexual initiation. But soon the show must move on to another town, leaving Artie alone with his dreams.

== Cast ==
- Frank Langella as Harry Crystal
- Glynnis O'Connor as Ramona
- Tom Hulce as Artie Shoemaker
- Jerry Stiller as Mr. Shoemaker
- Herbert Berghof as Dr. Julius Fuldauer
- Kevin McCarthy as Mickey Bellinger
- Joseph Maher as Fibby Geyer
- George Morfogen as Sherman Sprat
