= Nightflyers (film) =

1987 American film

- Theatrical release poster
- Directed by: Robert Collector (as T.C. Blake)
- Written by: George R. R. Martin; Robert Jaffe
- Based on: Nightflyers by George R. R. Martin
- Produced by: Robert Jaffe
- Starring: Catherine Mary Stewart; Michael Praed; John Standing; Lisa Blount; Glenn Withrow; James Avery
- Cinematography: Shelly Johnson
- Edited by: Tom Siiter
- Music by: Doug Timm
- Distributed by: The Vista Organization
- Release date: October 23, 1987
- Running time: 89 min
- Country: United States
- Language: English
- Budget: $3 million
- Box office: $1,149,470

Nightflyers is a 1987 American science fiction horror film based on the 1980 novella of the same name by George R. R. Martin. Martin himself co-wrote the screenplay with Robert Jaffe.

== Plot ==
In the 21st century, after scientist D’Brannin has decoded an alien signal from the Valkrens, he assembles a team with questionable credentials to locate the source, including Audrey, Keelor, Darryl, Lilly, Jon Winderman (a class ten telepath), Jon's assistant Eliza, and Miranda (who narrates). They board the ship, called the Nightflyer, and are welcomed by a holograph of the captain, Royd Eris, as D'Brannin explains the ship is completely automated so that the captain can stay in his cabin.

Jon is increasingly concerned as he telepathically senses something wrong. Little cameras everywhere watch the crew, and Lilly is unable to access the computer. Royd holographically confides in Miranda that he is a cross-sex clone of his "mother," a telepath/telekinetic who died before he was incubated, and that he has been raised by the computer that runs the ship. He is used to zero-g and has no natural immunity, and though direct contact with humans may likely kill him he wants to leave the ship once they return.

Jon tells everyone that the Nightflyer is alive and it wants to hurt them before the kitchen explodes, injuring Darryl, and the ship electrically restrains Royd in his cabin; the ship doesn’t want him to leave. The team decides they want to turn back, but Miranda reveals that the computer won't let them. Jon takes some kind of enhancement drug and sees the apparent soul of the ship before killing Eliza. He tells Miranda that the computer is actually Royd’s mother Adara, who transferred her consciousness into the core of the ship, and that Adara would kill all of them to ensure that Royd stays. Jon says that they need to break into the stone crypt that stores her core and destroy it. As they continue to talk, Jon appears to be possessed by Adara before sedating Miranda and bringing her to the medical bay. Miranda recovers and fights the possessed Jon, who ends up decapitated by the medical equipment.

Darryl, Lilly, and Audrey try to hack into the computer when the computer opens an airlock, killing Lilly. Meanwhile, Royd rejects the computerized Adara and threatens leaving if she harms the team, eventually breaking free from the restraints and physically leaving his cabin. He finds Adara and smashes the crystal and wiring above her crypt, which shuts down the ship.

Royd tells the team that he’s shut down the computer, but the cargo bay has been damaged and the ship has started to decompress, meaning implosion if they cannot patch it within three hours. The remaining team members go outside of the Nightflyer to make repairs, and are joined by Royd. Adara, apparently not dead after all, turns the ship back on (though not the artificial gravity), and Keeler flies inside to kill it, followed by Darryl and Audrey. Adara locks Royd, Miranda, and D'Bannin outside of the ship before exploding D'Bannin's pod.

Inside the ship, Keeler is killed trying to cut into Adara's core. Audrey is shot by Adara, and Darryl is stabbed by Jon's possessed corpse. Miranda and Royd, who remains in his pod, find a way inside. Miranda is attacked by Jon's corpse before it is re-killed by Royd. Artificial gravity is restored as Royd struggles to telekinetically electrocute Adara's core. Adara's body emerges from her crypt and electrocutes Royd until Miranda stabs her in the back. The Nightflyer explodes as Royd and Miranda escape in Royd's pod, continuing the mission to find the Valkrens.

== Cast ==
- Catherine Mary Stewart as Miranda Dorlac
- Michael Praed as Royd Eris
- John Standing as Michael D'Brannin
- Lisa Blount as Audrey
- Glenn Withrow as Keelor
- James Avery as Darryl
- Annabel Brooks as Eliza
- Michael Des Barres as Jon Winderman

== Production ==
=== Development ===
The film is based on a novella that appears in George R. R. Martin's 1985 short story collection. Originally written in 1980, the 23,000-word novella was published by Analog Science Fiction and Fact. In 1981, at the request of his editor at the time, James Frenkel, Martin expanded the story into a 30,000-word piece, which was published by Dell Publishing, together with Vernor Vinge's True Names, as part of their Binary Star series. In the extended version, Martin supplied additional backstory on several characters, and named secondary characters which were not named in the original version.

Nightflyers is set in the same fictional "Thousand Worlds" universe as several of Martin's other works, including Dying of the Light, Sandkings, A Song for Lya, "The Way of Cross and Dragon", "With Morning Comes Mistfall", and the stories collected in Tuf Voyaging.

=== Adaptation ===
Screen and television rights were purchased by Vista in 1984, which produced a 1987 film adaptation with a screenplay co-written by Martin, with writer/producer Robert Jaffe. It was directed by Robert Collector, using the pseudonym "T. C. Blake" as he left before post-production was completed. According to Martin, writer/producer Robert Jaffe probably adapted his script from the shorter novella version, since all the secondary characters had different names than the ones he chose in the expanded version. The film grossed $1,149,470. Martin was unhappy about having to cut plot elements in order to accommodate the film's small budget. While not a hit at theatres, Martin believes that the film saved his career, and that everything he has written since exists in large part because of it.

== Home media ==
The film was released on VHS, Betamax, and LaserDisc in 1988 by International Video Entertainment.
