= Tyrion Lannister =

Character in A Song of Ice and Fire

- A Song of Ice and Fire character Game of Thrones character
- Peter Dinklage as Tyrion Lannister
- First appearance: Literature: A Game of Thrones (1996); Television: "Winter Is Coming" (2011); Video game: "Iron From Ice" (2014)
- Last appearance: Television: "The Iron Throne" (2019); Video game: Reigns: Game of Thrones (2018)
- Created by: George R. R. Martin
- Adapted by: David Benioff; D. B. Weiss (Game of Thrones)
- Portrayed by: Peter Dinklage
- Voiced by: Peter Dinklage (video game)
- Motion capture: Peter Dinklage (video game)

In-universe information
- Aliases: Yollo; Hugor Hill
- Nicknames: The Imp; The Halfman
- Gender: Male
- Titles: Acting Hand of the King; Master of Coin; Lord of Casterly Rock (claimant); Television: Hand of the Queen (to Daenerys I Targaryen); Hand of the King (to Bran Stark); Lord of Casterly Rock; Lord Paramount of the Westerlands; Warden of the West
- Occupation: King's functionary
- Family: House Lannister
- Spouses: Tysha (annulled); Sansa Stark (unconsummated)
- Significant other: Shae
- Relatives: Tywin Lannister (father); Joanna Lannister (mother); Cersei Lannister (sister); Jaime Lannister (brother); Joffrey Baratheon (nephew); Myrcella Baratheon (niece); Tommen Baratheon (nephew); Kevan Lannister (uncle); Lancel Lannister (cousin)

Tyrion Lannister is a fictional character in the A Song of Ice and Fire series of epic fantasy novels by American author George R. R. Martin and its television adaptation, Game of Thrones, in which he is portrayed by American actor Peter Dinklage.

Introduced in A Game of Thrones (1996), Tyrion is a prominent point of view character in the series, having the most viewpoint chapters in the first five published novels. He is one of a few prominent characters not included in A Feast for Crows (2005), but he returned in A Dance with Dragons (2011) and is confirmed to appear in the forthcoming sixth novel, The Winds of Winter. Tyrion developed from a character concept Martin had while writing the 1981 novel Windhaven. He is Martin's favorite character in the series.

Tyrion is the youngest child of Lord Tywin Lannister, the patriarch of House Lannister, the wealthiest family in the Seven Kingdoms of Westeros. A dwarf whose birth killed his mother, he is despised by Tywin and his sister, Cersei. Tyrion soothes his perceived inadequacies with wit and self-indulgence, also using his status as a Lannister and the support of his brother, Jaime, to better his own position.

Tyrion has been called one of the author's finest creations and most popular characters by The New York Times. The popularity of the character led Martin and Bantam Books to publish The Wit & Wisdom of Tyrion Lannister (2013), an illustrated collection of Tyrion quotes from the novels. Dinklage has received universal acclaim for his performance as Tyrion. He won four Primetime Emmy Awards for Outstanding Supporting Actor in a Drama Series and a Golden Globe Award for Best Supporting Actor in a Series, Miniseries, or Television Film. He is the only Game of Thrones actor to win an Emmy award and the only actor to receive a nomination for each season.

== Character ==
=== Description ===
In A Game of Thrones (1996), Tyrion is introduced as the third and youngest child of wealthy and powerful Tywin Lannister, the former Hand of the King, and Joanna Lannister, who dies giving birth to him. Tyrion's elder sister, Cersei, is the Queen of Westeros by virtue of her marriage to King Robert Baratheon, and Cersei's male twin, Jaime, is one of the Kingsguard, the royal bodyguard. Described as an ugly ("for all the world like a gargoyle"), malformed dwarf with different colored eyes, green and black, Tyrion possesses the white-blond hair of a Lannister but has a complicated relationship with the rest of them. While he is afforded the privilege and luxuries of his family, he is treated as a "second class noble" because of his stature. Tyrion's mother, Joanna, died giving birth to him and Tywin and Cersei loathe him because they blame him for her death. While Tywin bears no affection for Tyrion, he nevertheless feels a sense of duty to his son, raising him in the Lannister fold and extending Tyrion a share of the family wealth. In contrast to Tywin and Cersei, Jaime has great affection for Tyrion and treats him with kindness, respect, friendship and love. Lev Grossman of Time wrote in 2011:

Tyrion Lannister [is] the brilliant, black-witted dwarf whose family has had the firmest grip on power for much of the series, though that's not saying much. Tyrion is another good example of what separates Tolkien and Martin. Tyrion isn't a hearty, ax-wielding, gold-mining member of a noble dwarven race. He's not Gimli. Tyrion is an actual dwarf, achondroplastic and stubby-limbed, a joke to passersby and an embarrassment to his family.

Tyrion is intelligent, witty, well-read, and shares his father's skill for business and political maneuvering. Grossman described the character as "a bitter, cynical, high-born dwarf", calling him "Martin's Falstaff". David Orr of The New York Times called Tyrion "a cynic, a drinker, an outcast and conspicuously the novels' most intelligent presence". He is often referred to throughout the series as "The Imp" due to his mischievous and cunning nature. As an outcast, he displays sympathy for other outcasts and the otherwise mistreated; the TV series version of the character commiserates with the illegitimate son of Ned Stark by saying, "All dwarfs are bastards in their father's eyes." Still, he is usually seen for his deformities and vices, rather than his virtues and good deeds. Tom Shippey of the Wall Street Journal wrote that other characters underestimate Tyrion: "His dwarf-status acts as a kind of protection, because—though he is probably the most intelligent character in the whole cast list—no one takes him seriously." Acknowledging that Tyrion's wit, humor and cunning are his survival mechanism, actor Dinklage told The New York Times that "He knows he has no skills with the sword and this is a world that is really deeply violent. Military rules. He would not be able to survive in that world, given his own strength. So he beats people to the punchline—he's entertaining."

=== Creation and overview ===
In 1981, Martin was collaborating with Lisa Tuttle on a trio of novellas that would be published as the novel Windhaven:

So while we were writing the books we thought about a dwarf who would have been the Lord of one of the islands. He had to be the ugliest person in the world but the most intelligent too. I kept that idea in my mind and it reappeared to me when I was starting to write Game of Thrones. So ... That's Tyrion Lannister.

Tyrion is a prominent point of view character in the novels, and both David Orr of The New York Times and Lev Grossman of Time called him one of Martin's "finest creations." Noting the character to be one of Martin's most popular, Dana Jennings of The New York Times called Tyrion "a bitter but brilliant dwarf whose humor, swagger and utter humanity make him the (often drunken) star of the series". Thomas M. Wagner wrote in 2001 that the character "may very well be the strongest antihero in all of contemporary fantasy". Dan Kois of The New York Times also noted in 2012 that "for fans of the novels, Tyrion is among the most beloved among the scores of kings, warriors, wenches, slaves, queens and monsters that populate George R. R. Martin's world". Martin said, "My readers identify with the outcast, with the underdog, with the person who's struggling rather than the golden boy".

Martin himself has singled out Tyrion as his favorite character in the series. Asked why, Martin said in a 2000 interview:

I think his wit is appealing. He gets off a lot of good iconoclastic, cynical one-liners, and those are fun to write. He's also a very gray character. All my characters are gray to a greater or lesser extent, but Tyrion is perhaps the deepest shade of gray, with the black and white in him most thoroughly mixed, and I find that very appealing. I've always liked gray characters more than black-and-white characters ... I look for ways to make my characters real and to make them human, characters who have good and bad, noble and selfish, well-mixed in their natures. Yes, I do certainly want people to think about the characters, and not just react with a knee-jerk. I read too much fiction myself in which you encounter characters who are very stereotyped. They're heroic-hero and dastardly-villain, and they're completely black or completely white. And that's boring, so far as I'm concerned.

Tyrion appears first in A Game of Thrones (1996), and then in A Clash of Kings (1998) and A Storm of Swords (2000). He is one of a handful of "sorely missed" major characters that do not appear in 2005's A Feast for Crows, but on his website in 2006 Martin released a sample chapter featuring Tyrion from his next novel A Dance with Dragons. In advance of the publication of A Dance with Dragons in 2011, Martin confirmed Tyrion's presence in the novel and called him one of "the characters people have been waiting for". Grossman concurred, writing of A Dance with Dragons, "Now the camera has swung back to the main characters: Jon Snow and Daenerys Targaryen and Tyrion Lannister." James Poniewozik of Time added that the return of these "favorite characters" gave A Dance with Dragons a "narrative edge" over A Feast for Crows. In April 2012, Martin read a Tyrion chapter from his forthcoming The Winds of Winter at Eastercon; a second Tyrion chapter was read at Worldcon in August 2013 and later released in the official A World of Ice and Fire iOS application on March 20, 2014.

In 2013, Bantam Books published The Wit & Wisdom of Tyrion Lannister, an illustrated collection of Tyrion quotes from the novels.

=== Development ===
As A Game of Thrones begins, Tyrion is a witty, hedonistic curiosity, protected by his family status but still the object of subtle derision. He is perhaps the most intelligent member of his family but is consistently underestimated and marginalized. Tyrion embraces the advantages of being a Lannister but at the same time is all too aware of its negative aspects and his own place as the embarrassment of the family. Initially he is the one Lannister remotely sympathetic to the Starks but he is soon caught in the middle of the conflict between the two Houses. Taken prisoner and put on trial for his life, "all of his skills at conniving must be brought to bear simply to stay alive". With the Starks and Lannisters fully at war, Tywin tasks Tyrion to manage affairs at King's Landing, recognizing that his son is intelligent and has inherited his skills with statecraft. In A Clash of Kings, Tyrion relishes his new power but finds that his sincere efforts to stabilize his nephew Joffrey's rule are being undermined and thwarted by the misguided and self-serving machinations of everyone around him. He plots to nullify the counterproductive whims of Joffrey and Cersei but the "much-maligned dwarf" finds himself "teetering between order and disaster as he tries to keep the Lannisters from losing absolutely everything". Thomas M. Wagner calls it a "defining moment" when Tyrion comments that he is all that keeps chaos from overwhelming the family and population who both despise him. Roberta Johnson of Booklist likens Tyrion to the calculating title character of Robert Graves' I, Claudius.

In A Storm of Swords, Tywin reclaims the office of Hand of the King and gives Tyrion the seemingly-impossible task of reforming the royal finances. Tyrion's previous efforts, crucial in keeping Joffrey in power and saving King's Landing from invasion are all but forgotten. Joffrey, emboldened by Tywin's return, publicly humiliates Tyrion; when Joffrey is murdered, everyone eagerly points the finger at Tyrion. Cersei does everything in her power to assure that he is declared guilty at trial. Innocent but condemned to death and hated more than ever, Tyrion takes a dark turn. Martin explains:

[Tyrion]'s lost everything ... He's lost his position in House Lannister, he's lost his position in court, he's lost all of his gold – which is the one thing that's kind of sustained him throughout his life ... and he's also found out that Jaime – the one blood relation that he loved unreservedly and has his back, and was always on his side – played a part in this traumatic event of his life, the ultimate betrayal ... He's so hurt that he wants to hurt other people ... and he knows that just up this ladder is a chamber that was once his that now his father has usurped from him ... And I don't think he knows what he's gonna say or do when he gets up there but he – some part of him feels compelled to do it. And of course then we find Shae there, that's an additional shock to him, an additional knife in his belly. I think sometimes people just get pushed too far, sometimes people break. And I think Tyrion has reached his point. He's been through hell, he's faced death over and over again, and he's been betrayed, as he sees it, by all the people that he's tried to take care of, that he's tried to win the approval of. He's been trying to win his father's approval all his life.

Finding his former lover Shae in his father's bed, Tyrion strangles her. Confronting Tywin with a crossbow soon after, he murders him too. To Martin, "the two actions are quite different, although they occur within moments of each other". The author continues, "He's furious at Lord Tywin because he found out the truth about his first wife and what happened to her, and ... Lord Tywin is convinced that since he doesn't love Tyrion, then no one can possibly love Tyrion." As Tywin repeatedly calls Tyrion's tragic first wife Tysha a "whore," Tyrion warns him to stop. Tywin has always taught his son that you must follow through on your threats if you are defied, so when he fails to heed Tyrion's warning, Tyrion kills him. "And it will haunt him. Tywin was his father and that will continue to haunt him, probably for the rest of his life," says the author. To Martin, Shae's murder is something else:

With Shae, it's a much more deliberate and in some ways a crueler thing. It's not the action of a second, because he's strangling her slowly and she's fighting, trying to get free. He could let go at any time. But his anger and his sense of betrayal is so strong that he doesn't stop until it's done and that's probably the blackest deed that he's ever done. It's the great crime of his soul along with what he did with his first wife by abandoning her after the little demonstration Lord Tywin put on ... it's again something that's going to haunt him, while the act of killing his father is something of enormous consequence that would be forever beyond the pale, for no man is as cursed as a kinslayer.

"Fan-favorite" Tyrion returns to the narrative in A Dance with Dragons, as he flees Westeros following the murders of Shae and Tywin "in a state of shock at his own actions". Across the narrow sea in Pentos and Slaver's Bay he soon finds himself "in just about the most humiliating and dire circumstances in a life that has seen more than its share of such". Cut off from his family's wealth and influence, he must use his wits to survive. As Booklist notes, "his astonishing adaptability evident as he goes from captive to conspirator to slave to mercenary without losing his tactical influence". Still in possession of the "cruel wit that has seen him through in the past", Tyrion provides, according to Thomas M. Wagner, the "warmest and most sympathetic moments" in the novel.

== Storylines ==
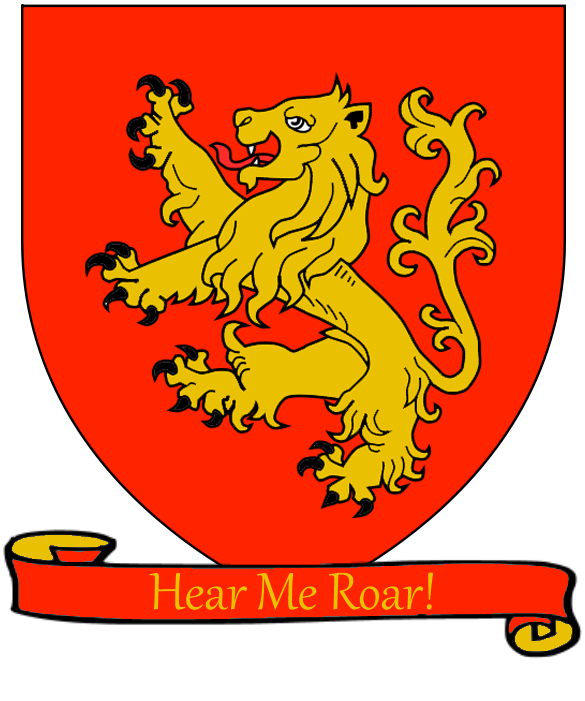
Coat of arms of House Lannister

=== A Game of Thrones ===
Tyrion accompanies King Robert Baratheon's entourage to visit the Stark stronghold of Winterfell, (Note: Martin (1996), ch 5 "Jon I") and disciplines his nephew Prince Joffrey when the latter refuses to pay respect to the recently crippled Bran Stark. (Note: Martin (1996), ch 9 "Tyrion I") He then opts to visit the Wall with a Night's Watch convoy, (Note: Martin (1996), ch 13 "Tyrion II") and befriends Ned Stark's bastard son Jon Snow at Castle Black. (Note: Martin (1996), ch 19 "Jon III") (Note: Martin (1996), ch 21 "Tyrion III") For his friendship with Jon, Tyrion visits Winterfell again on the return journey and designs a specialized saddle to help Bran ride a horse. (Note: Martin (1996), ch 24 "Bran IV")

At the Crossroad Inn, Tyrion encounters Ned's wife Catelyn, who accuses him of hiring an assassin to kill Bran and arrests him by enlisting nearby men-at-arms. (Note: Martin (1996), ch 28 "Catelyn V") Catelyn then takes the captured Tyrion to the Eyrie in the Vale, so he can be judged by Catelyn's sister Lysa Arryn. (Note: Martin (1996), ch 31 "Tyrion IV") While on the way, the procession is attacked by mountain clans and Tyrion assists in fighting them off. Tyrion denies the charges and demands a trial by combat, and is championed by a sellsword named Bronn, (Note: Martin (1996), ch 38 "Tyrion V") who wins the duel and secures Tyrion's freedom. (Note: Martin (1996), ch 40 "Catelyn VII") Tyrion is sent through a dangerous road in a plot to murder him. Using his wit and the promise of a reward, Tyrion wins over a number of mountain tribes as his personal bodyguards while on his way to the Lannister army camp. (Note: Martin (1996), ch 42 "Tyrion VI") (Note: Martin (1996), ch 56 "Tyrion VII") He then participates in the Battle on the Green Fork, sent as the vanguard by his father Tywin Lannister. (Note: Martin (1996), ch 62 "Tyrion VIII") Impressed with Tyrion's capabilities, Tywin dispatches Tyrion to the capital city King's Landing as the acting Hand of the King in an attempt to control King Joffrey and Queen Cersei's political recklessness. (Note: Martin (1996), ch 69 "Tyrion IX") While at the camp, Tyrion beds a camp follower named Shae and takes her with him to the capital.

=== A Clash of Kings ===
Tyrion arrives at King's Landing and immediately recognizes the chaos created by Joffrey and Cersei's abuse of power. Seeking to consolidate power and preserve order in the capital, Tyrion methodically identifies and removes Cersei's supporters. Disgusted by Joffrey's behavior and Cersei's failure to control him, Tyrion openly opposes the young king and tries to keep the hostage Sansa Stark out of harm's way.

When Stannis Baratheon is marching to siege King's Landing, Tyrion masterminds the capital's defense, even personally leading a sortie that drives Stannis from the gates. When fighting on the burning wreckage of Stannis' fleet, Tyrion is attacked and grievously wounded by the Kingsguard knight Ser Mandon Moore, but is saved by his young squire Podrick Payne. Tyrion suspects Joffrey or Cersei behind the assassination attempt, but is unable to get revenge on either.

=== A Storm of Swords ===
Upon his recovery from the injury sustained at Blackwater, Tyrion finds that he has lost most of his nose, and a returned Tywin has assumed the position of Hand himself and removed Tyrion from power. (Note: Martin (2000), ch 4 "Tyrion I") Tyrion is then appointed Master of Coin as a "reward" for his successful leadership, which is really the burden of fixing the Crown's fiscal mess. After learning of the Tyrell plot to claim Winterfell through marriage to Sansa, Tywin coerces Tyrion into marrying her instead. (Note: Martin (2000), ch 8 "Tyrion III") Sympathetic to Sansa's situation, Tyrion leaves their marriage unconsummated, despite his father's orders to conceive a child with her as soon as possible. (Note: Martin (2000), ch 8 "Tyrion IV") Tyrion is also given the difficult task of hosting the visiting Dornish convoy from the hostile House Martell.

At the celebration of Joffrey's wedding to Margaery Tyrell, Joffrey openly humiliates Tyrion but later dies from poisoned wine. Cersei promptly accuses and arrests Tyrion. His previous good deeds forgotten, Tyrion is put on trial as Cersei manipulates the proceedings to ensure a guilty verdict. He is heartbroken to find that Shae has also turned against him and openly humiliates him in court. In his grief and anger, Tyrion demands a trial by combat, to which Cersei responds by naming the formidable Ser Gregor Clegane as her champion. After Bronn declines to fight for Tyrion, Prince Oberyn Martell surprisingly agrees to become Tyrion's champion to fight Gregor, but dies in the duel, and thus Tyrion loses the trial. Pronounced guilty, Tyrion is taken to the dungeon on death row, but a recently returned Jaime frees him with the help of spymaster Varys and eventually confesses his complicity in Tywin's ruin of Tyrion's first wife, Tysha. Furious, Tyrion swears revenge on his family for a lifetime of cruelty, falsely admits to murdering Joffrey, and reveals Cersei's promiscuity in order to hurt Jaime. Before escaping the palace, Tyrion acquires a secret passage from Varys into Tywin's chamber, and finds Shae naked in Tywin's bed. After strangling her in a rage, Tyrion confronts and corners Tywin on the privy with a crossbow. When Tywin speaks ill of Tysha, Tyrion fatally shoots his father before fleeing Westeros on a ship organized by Varys.

=== A Dance with Dragons ===
Tyrion is taken to Pentos, where he finds himself under the protection of wealthy Magister Illyrio Mopatis. There he learns that Varys and Illyrio have secretly plotted to reinstate the Targaryen dynasty since the murder of the Mad King Aerys II. On Illyrio's advice, Tyrion agrees to seek out and join Aerys' surviving daughter Daenerys at Meereen and help her reclaim the Iron Throne. He realizes that two of his traveling companions are not what they seem — one sellsword named "Griff" is Jon Connington, Crown Prince Rhaegar's close friend and Aerys' disgraced former Hand of the King; the other teenager named "Young Griff" is claimed to be Rhaegar's supposedly slain son Aegon, whom Varys allegedly had spirited away and replaced with another baby who was instead killed by Gregor Clegane during the Lannisters' sack of King's Landing. Tyrion then uses a game of cyvasse to sabotage Illyrio's plan by persuading Young Griff into abandoning the idea of an alliance with Daenerys.

While stopping at the trading town Selhorys on the way to Volantis, Tyrion visits a brothel and is recognized and abducted by an exiled Jorah Mormont, who believes that delivering a Lannister to Daenerys will return himself to her good graces. After negotiating passage to Meereen along with a dwarf girl named Penny, their ship is disabled by a violent storm, and all of them are captured and enslaved by the Yunkai'i slavers currently besieging Meereen. During the armistice, Tyrion and Penny are forced to perform mock jousts riding pigs in the fighting pits of Meereen, which are actually staged as a spectacle to have them eventually eaten by lions, but they are saved when Daenerys intervenes and stops the show.

When the plague of bloody flux strikes the slavers' siege camps, Tyrion engineers their escape by murdering the overseer with poisonous mushrooms, and they join the sellsword company the Second Sons, whose leader, Ben Plumm, knows Jorah. In exchange for membership, Tyrion promises the company the wealth of Casterly Rock, his birthright since Tywin is dead and Jaime has renounced it to join the Kingsguard. Tyrion quickly realizes the Yunkai'i forces are on the losing side, and attempts to convince the Second Sons to change their allegiance.

=== The Winds of Winter ===
Tyrion was confirmed by Martin as a returning character in the upcoming sixth book, with two chapters currently released to the public. One chapter was read by Martin at Eastercon in April 2012, and another one at Worldcon in August 2013, the second of which was later published in the official iOS app on March 20, 2014.

While in the Second Sons, Tyrion attempts to persuade Ben Plumm, over a game of cyvasse, to rejoin Daenerys. News of the Iron Fleet (led by Victarion Greyjoy) entering Slaver's Bay reaches the encampment. While the Second Sons are preparing for the battle that rages around them, news arrives that the fellow sellsword company Windblown has defected to Daenerys. In a meeting of their officers, where the Yunkish commander demands that they reinforce a trebuchet under attack by Daenerys' Unsullied, Jorah kills the Yunkish messenger, and Ben Plumm declares that the Second Sons will rejoin Daenerys.

== Family tree of House Lannister ==
Descendants of Tytos Lannister

Tytos	Jeyne; Marbrand
Joanna	Tywin	Emmon; Frey	Genna	Kevan	Dorna; Swyft	Tygett	Darlessa; Marbrand	Gerion	Briony
Robert; Baratheon	Cersei	Jaime	Tysha (Note: Tyrion's first wife was a peasant girl named Tysha. The marriage was later annulled by Lord Tywin's order.)	Tyrion	Sansa; Stark	Amerei; Frey	Lancel	Martyn	Willem	Janei	Tyrek	Ermesande; Hayford	Joy; Hill
Joffrey; Baratheon (Note: Though officially Robert's children, Joffrey, Myrcella and Tommen are the products of an incestuous affair between Cersei and Jaime.)	Myrcella; Baratheon	Margaery; Tyrell	Tommen; Baratheon	Tion; Frey	"Red" Walder; Frey	Jeyne; Darry	Cleos; Frey	Lyonel; Frey	Melesa Crakehall
Tywin; Frey	Willem; Frey

References and notes:

== TV adaptation ==
Executive producers/writers David Benioff and D. B. Weiss had pitched the idea of adapting Martin's series for television to HBO in March 2006, and the network secured the rights in January 2007. The first actor cast was Peter Dinklage as Tyrion in May 2009. Benioff and Weiss later noted that the funny and "incredibly smart" Dinklage was their first choice for the role, as the actor's "core of humanity, covered by a shell of sardonic dry wit, is pretty well in keeping with the character." Unfamiliar with the source material, Dinklage was cautious in his first meeting with the producers; as a someone with dwarfism, "he wouldn't play elves or leprechauns" and—choosy about genre roles—he had just come from portraying the dwarf Trumpkin in 2008's The Chronicles of Narnia: Prince Caspian. Benioff and Weiss told Dinklage that the character was "a different kind of fantasy little person," or in the actor's words, "No beard, no pointy shoes, a romantic, real human being." Dinklage signed on to play Tyrion before the meeting was half over, in part because "they told [him] how popular he was." Martin said of Dinklage's casting, "If he hadn't accepted the part, oh, boy, I don't know what we would have done." Benioff added, "When I read George's books, I decided Tyrion Lannister was one of the great characters in literature. Not just fantasy literature—literature! A brilliant, caustic, horny, drunken, self-flagellating mess of a man. And there was only one choice to play him."

In October 2014, Dinklage and several other key cast members, all contracted for six seasons of the series, renegotiated their deals to include a potential seventh season and salary increases for seasons five, six, and seven. The Hollywood Reporter called the raises "huge", noting that the deal would make the performers "among the highest-paid actors on cable TV". Deadline Hollywood put the number for season five at "close to $300,000 (Note: equivalent to $407,998 in 2025.) an episode" for each actor, and The Hollywood Reporter wrote in June 2016 that the performers would each be paid "upward of $500,000 (Note: equivalent to $670,757 in 2025.) per episode" for seasons seven and the potential eight. In 2017, Dinklage became one of the highest-paid actors on television and earned £2,000,000 (Note: equivalent to £2,672,873 in 2025. Equivalent to US$257,399.4 ($2.63 million in 2025)) per episode.

=== Storylines ===
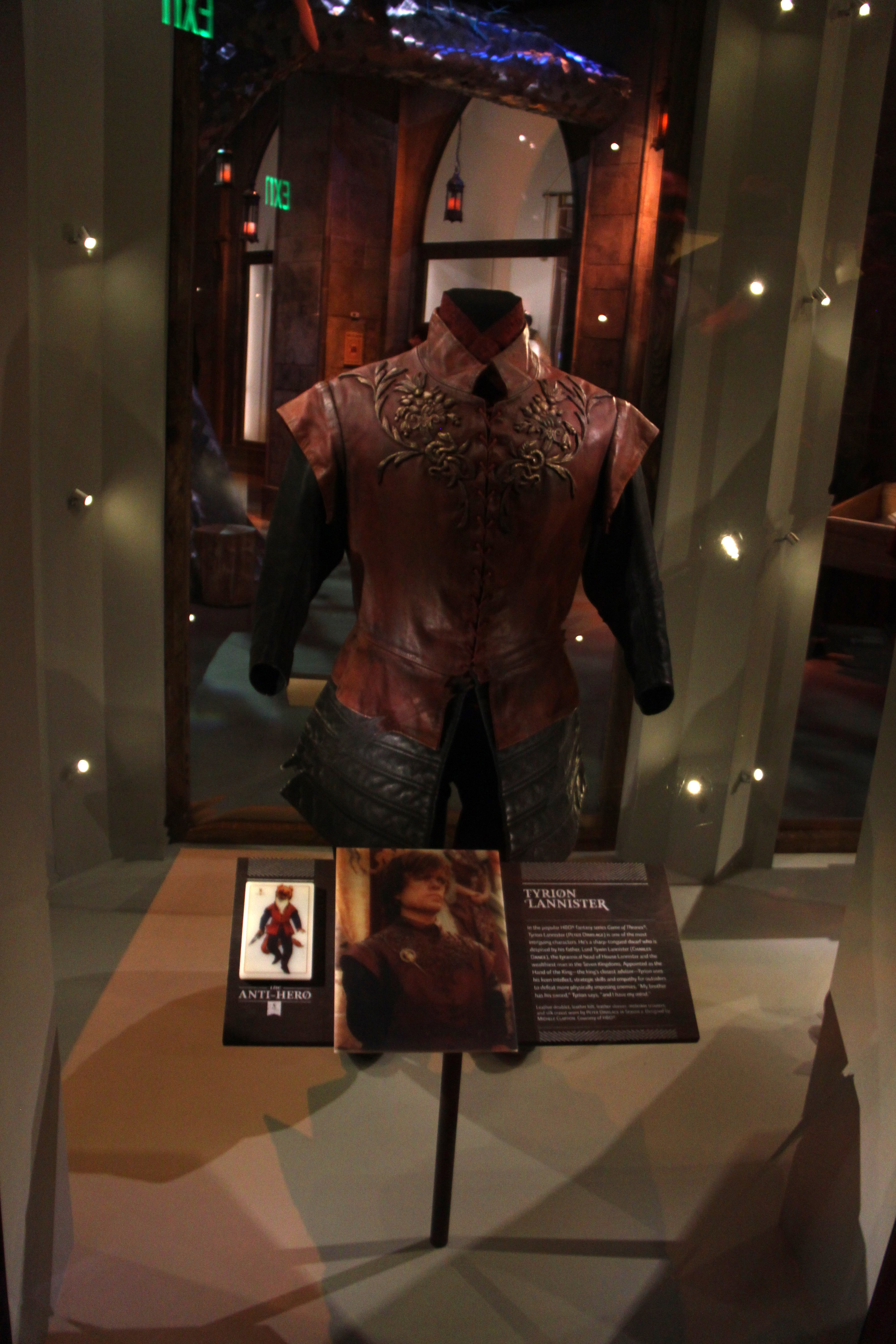
A costume worn by Peter Dinklage in the TV series Game of Thrones

Seasons 1 and 2 (2011–12) follow the events of A Game of Thrones and A Clash of Kings, respectively. The plot of A Storm of Swords was split into seasons 3 and 4 (2013–14). Both season 5 and season 6 adapt material from A Feast for Crows and A Dance with Dragons, novels whose plots run concurrently and each contain different characters. Though the HBO series has alternately extended, abbreviated, conflated and diverged from the novels' plot lines, Tyrion's character and story arc have remained mostly consistent with Martin's writing.

==== Season 1 ====
Calling the character the "black sheep" of the Lannister family, TV Guide wrote as the show premiered in 2011 that "Tyrion sees through all the chicanery and decides the best option is to drink and bed his way through the Seven Kingdoms." The Boston Globe added that he is "a hedonistic intellectual who can talk his way out of anything." According to the Los Angeles Times, "brilliant but low-living" Tyrion is "so well acquainted with the workings of the world he can hardly bear it, the Imp is ... debauched, perhaps, but a truth-teller nonetheless, fighting for his own survival with as much mercy as he can spare." The New York Times went as far as to name Tyrion "the closest thing to a hero" in the HBO series.

As in A Game of Thrones, Tyrion travels to Winterfell with the royal family, and accompanies Ned Stark's bastard son Jon Snow on his journey to the Wall. On his way back to King's Landing, Tyrion is seized by Catelyn Stark, who suspects him of having plotted to assassinate her son Bran. Taken to the Eyrie, where Catelyn's sister Lysa Arryn rules as regent, Tyrion is put to trial. Tyrion demands trial by combat, naming as his champion the sellsword Bronn, who is victorious. The two meet up with Tyrion's father, Tywin, whose forces are fighting Robb Stark's army as retaliation for his capture. Tyrion is accidentally knocked unconscious as the battle begins. Tywin sends Tyrion to King's Landing to act as Hand of the King. Disobeying Tywin's orders, Tyrion takes the sex worker Shae with him.

==== Season 2 ====
During the second season, Neil Genzlinger of The New York Times wrote that "Tyrion is just about the only character developing any complexity. Maybe even a glimmer of a conscience." Emily Nussbaum of The New Yorker noted, "If the show has a hero, it's Tyrion (Dinklage), who is capable of cruelty but also possesses insight and empathy, concealed beneath a carapace of Wildean wit." The Hollywood Reporter called Tyrion "the one to watch, as he's the smartest Lannister and knows that having a brat for a king – who mistreats all those around him – could cause major backlash." Willa Paskin of Salon called the character's increased prominence in Season 2 "a trade up in entertainment value, and a trade-off in morality." She added, "Tyrion is more cynical, more manipulative and much better suited to surviving. He's not so keen to be made into meat, and that makes him the kind of man characters in the show and audience members alike should be investing in." Praising Dinklage, Dan Kois of The New York Times wrote, "He plays Tyrion as the only modern man in a muddy, violent, primal world. He loves good food, good conversation and a good book. Unlike the warmongering lords and knights of Westeros, but like most HBO subscribers, he would prefer to stay out of battle." Kois adds that, "Dinklage's bravado masks Tyrion's deep well of melancholy." Of the Season 2 storyline, Dinklage noted that Tyrion enjoys not only his foray into battle, but also his new and unprecedented power at court. He said, "This is a character that's been shit upon his whole life. I mean, he comes from great wealth, but he's treated very poorly, so now there's a newfound respect where if somebody calls him a name, he can have them killed. He never had that before. Tyrion definitely enjoys that part, and he's trying desperately to hold onto it. He's enjoying it while it lasts 'cause he's not sure it's gonna last very long." As Varys the Spymaster tells Tyrion, power is "a trick, a shadow on the wall ... and a very small man can cast a very large shadow."

As Hand of the King, Tyrion attempts to control his cruel and incompetent nephew Joffrey, and defend King's Landing from Stannis Baratheon, the rival claimant to the Iron Throne. Tyrion destroys much of Stannis' attacking fleet with wildfire, but is almost assassinated during the battle, presumably at Joffrey's or Cersei's command. Tyrion recovers to find himself stripped of power by his returned father, and without recognition for his heroics. Shae implores Tyrion to move to Pentos with her, but he opts to remain in King's Landing.

==== Season 3 ====
Season 2 leaves Tyrion "broke, beaten, scarred for life and stripped of his power," despite having been instrumental in saving King's Landing from invasion. It is his chance to escape the sordid and deadly "game of thrones," but he cannot bring himself to, confessing, "Bad people are what I'm good at." So Tyrion finds he must submit to Tywin's plan of marrying him to Sansa Stark; despite being drunk in order to soothe his many woes, Tyrion manages to save Sansa from being publicly stripped and likely raped by Joffrey, and later "chooses decency over filial loyalty and elects not to consummate the marriage after all." Tyrion is also now powerless against Joffrey's malice, but Tywin has asserted his control over the young king, if only when it serves his own desires; he stops Joffrey from presenting Sansa with her brother's head, but not because he cares about Sansa or Tyrion's outrage. Despite Tywin's continuous determination to make Tyrion feel "miserable and unloved," he believes he is a good father – because he resisted the urge to cast Tyrion into the sea at birth. Though he should not be surprised by his father's coldblooded machinations, Tyrion is horrified by Tywin's involvement in the Red Wedding; Emily St. James writes, "only Tyrion seems to understand that the blood they spilled will eventually be avenged. The North may have calmed for now, but it won't be calm always." Of that storyline, Matt Fowler of IGN notes, "Only an event that powerful could keep series-favorite Tyrion out of an episode for the first time."

Tyrion asks Tywin to be named heir to House Lannister's ancestral home, Casterly Rock. Tywin angrily refuses and threatens to hang Shae if she is found in his bed again, but does have Tyrion named as Master of Coin, the treasurer. He also forces Tyrion to marry Sansa Stark against his will, though both decide not to consummate the marriage. Tyrion and Sansa begin to bond as they are both outcasts in King's Landing, until Sansa discovers that her mother Catelyn and brother Robb have been murdered as a result of Tywin's scheming.

==== Season 4 ====
In March 2014, Dinklage confirmed that Season 4 would "stick fairly closely" to Tyrion's plot line in A Storm of Swords, adding that "those reversals of fortune really send [Tyrion] down the rabbit hole." He notes that the character changes in Season 4, and "really ends up in a different place than he thought he was going to. It's fueled a bit by anger towards his family, and trying to find his place in the world. You see that some people rely on drunk, funny Tyrion. I think funny and drunk lasts only so long. He sobers up in many ways. And love is in his life [with Shae], and that causes a tremendous amount of damage – because he's vulnerable and he doesn't like to be vulnerable. He's completely stripped of his defense mechanisms." Of Tyrion's relationship with his brother Jaime, Dinklage said, "If you're raised together, you have an unspoken dialogue many times, and it's very easy, especially between Jaime and Tyrion. They have a real friendship, a good brotherhood. They look after each other." As in the novels, Tyrion is (unfairly) found guilty of Joffrey's murder and condemned to death; the HBO series does not use the reveal that his first wife was not really a sex worker to motivate Tyrion to kill his father, and he does not lie to Jaime that he is guilty of killing Joffrey.

Fearing for Shae's safety, Tyrion breaks up with her and orders her to leave for Pentos. She refuses until he calls her a whore, and declares that she cannot have his children. Joffrey is poisoned to death at his wedding feast, and Cersei immediately accuses Tyrion. At his trial, Shae appears to testify against him, falsely claiming that Sansa refused to bed Tyrion unless he killed Joffrey. Outraged at her betrayal and finally snapping from years of mockery for his dwarfism, Tyrion demands a trial by combat but only after a very intense monologue about the people he hates/despises and the state of affairs. Cersei names the virtually undefeatable Gregor Clegane as her champion. Tyrion is defended by Oberyn Martell, who believes that Gregor murdered his sister, niece, and nephew. Oberyn is nearly victorious, but his refusal to kill Gregor without obtaining a confession allows Gregor to kill him, and Tyrion is sentenced to death. Before his execution, Tyrion is released by Jaime to be smuggled out of Westeros by Varys. Tyrion decides to confront Tywin before his flight, and finds Shae in his father's bed. Tyrion strangles her to death, and then confronts Tywin on the privy. Tyrion kills his father with a crossbow bolt, and then leaves for Pentos with Varys.

==== Season 5 ====
In 2015, James Hibberd of Entertainment Weekly called Tyrion's meeting with Daenerys Targaryen (Emilia Clarke) an "iconic meetup" that "delighted fans, who were universally enthusiastic (for once!) about the showrunners making a narrative move not yet found in George R.R. Martin's novels." Dinklage said in the interview, "That's the great thing about my character: He's been everywhere. He's the only character that goes searching. He's been to The Wall, and now he has to find the dragons." Benioff and Weiss said that the conversation between Tyrion and Daenerys focused on the parallels between their lives, as Tyrion had a "lot of empathy" toward Daenerys for being an orphan, like himself, and both had "terrible fathers". Tyrion realized that Varys might be right about Daenerys being the "last hope for Westeros". Benioff and Weiss also suggested that Tyrion believes that Daenerys could bring him "back into power".

Tyrion arrives in Pentos, where Varys reveals that he has been conspiring to restore House Targaryen to power, and asks Tyrion to journey with him to meet Daenerys Targaryen in Meereen. During their journey, Tyrion is kidnapped by Daenerys' former advisor Jorah Mormont, who aims to redeem himself to Daenerys by bringing her the dwarf. However, Tyrion and Jorah are captured by slavers, whom Tyrion convinces to sell them to the fighting pits in Meereen. During a demonstration of pit fighters, Tyrion and Jorah encounter Daenerys; she decides to take Tyrion into her service, but orders Jorah exiled again. At the re-opening of Meereen's fighting pits, the insurgency known as the Sons of the Harpy launch a massive attack, which is only thwarted when Daenerys' dragon Drogon appears and scares off the Sons, before riding off with Daenerys on his back. Although Tyrion wishes to join Jorah and Daario Naharis in their search for Daenerys, Daario points out that his skills are best suited to governing Meereen in Daenerys' absence. Varys later arrives in Meereen and offers Tyrion the use of his spy network to maintain order in the city.

==== Season 6 ====
Tyrion discovers that the Sons of the Harpy are funded by the slavers of Yunkai, Astapor, and Volantis, and arranges a meeting with representatives of those cities to give them seven years to abolish slavery. Despite Tyrion's insistence that compromise is necessary, this solution is met with disapproval by Daenerys' other advisors and the freedmen of Meereen. Tyrion also enlists the assistance of the red priestess Kinvara, who believes that Daenerys is a messianic figure prophesied by her faith and offers the support of the followers of R'hllor. Meereen begins to prosper, but the city's success attracts the ire of the slavers, who fear it will undermine the legitimacy of slavery, and so launch a massive naval attack against the city. Daenerys returns in the chaos, and though she is displeased with Tyrion's failure, she is persuaded by him to obliterate the slavers' fleet and force their ultimate surrender rather than destroy them outright. Soon after, Theon and Yara Greyjoy arrive in Meereen offering Daenerys the Iron Fleet; they are joined by the fleets of Dorne and the Reach, who have defected from the Lannisters. Daenerys names an honored Tyrion as her Hand of the Queen. Tyrion then joins her, the dragons, and her army as they sail to Westeros.

==== Season 7 ====
Plotting their conquest of Westeros from Dragonstone, the ancestral Targaryen fortress, Daenerys and Tyrion learn that Jon Snow has been named King in the North. Tyrion suggests that Jon would make a valuable ally; Daenerys and Jon are impressed with each other, but she is annoyed when he declines to swear his allegiance to her. Daenerys and her allies discuss their strategy for the war against the Lannisters. Tyrion advises against a direct attack on King's Landing, and Daenerys agrees to his nuanced series of attacks. However, Cersei and Jaime outmaneuver him, neutralizing Daenerys' Tyrell and Dornish support. A furious Daenerys ignores Tyrion's continued arguments for caution and decimates a Lannister caravan with her dragons. He is also unable to stop her from executing Randyll and Dickon Tarly, who refuse to swear fealty to her even after their defeat. In "Eastwatch", Tyrion meets with Jaime in secret to broker a meeting between Cersei and Daenerys. In "The Dragon and the Wolf", he helps convince Cersei that the advancing undead are a more immediate threat than the war with Daenerys for control of Westeros.

==== Season 8 ====
Tyrion returns to Winterfell with the Targaryen forces. He is reunited with Sansa, who doubts Cersei's promise to send aid and is disappointed that Tyrion would fall for Cersei's lie. Jaime later arrives in Winterfell and confirms that no Lannister forces are coming. Daenerys questions Tyrion's ability to serve as her Hand after so many mistakes in judgment, but after talking to Jorah privately, she acknowledges that Tyrion is useful to her, and orders him down in the crypts during the battle against the dead for his own safety, to his chagrin. During the battle, the Night King reanimates the Starks buried in the crypts; Tyrion and Sansa hide together, prepared to face the horde, but soon the Night King is killed, and the Army of the Dead destroyed.

While preparing to travel south to besiege King's Landing, Tyrion learns from Sansa of Jon's heritage as a trueborn Targaryen. He tells Varys, who considers whether Jon is a better option to rule Westeros than Daenerys. Tyrion recommits to Daenerys and reveals Varys' treachery, and Daenerys executes Varys. Tyrion convinces Daenerys to halt the destruction of King's Landing if the people surrender, signalled by the ringing of the city's bells. Tyrion releases Jaime, who has been captured attempting to sneak into King's Landing, and sends him to convince Cersei to surrender rather than face Daenerys' wrath. Though the city surrenders, Tyrion is horrified when Daenerys uses Drogon to burn the city, destroy the Red Keep, and slaughter the population. Following the battle, Tyrion wanders through the ruins of King's Landing and eventually discovers the corpses of Jaime and Cersei, crushed by rubble in the Red Keep. After the victorious Daenerys promises to take her armies on a campaign of "liberation" throughout the world, she accuses Tyrion of treason for releasing Jaime. When he resigns as Hand in protest, she has him arrested and sentences him to death. In prison, Tyrion persuades Jon that he must kill Daenerys for the good of the realm. Jon hesitates but eventually kills Daenerys and is also imprisoned.

Some time later, Tyrion (still held prisoner of Grey Worm and the Unsullied) persuades a council of the most powerful lords and ladies of Westeros to reject coronation by birthright and to instead agree to select each new ruler by council vote. He then suggests they make Bran king, claiming Bran's supernatural knowledge and wisdom make him an unparalleled choice to lead Westeros. The council votes unanimously in favor. Bran accepts the position and names Tyrion as his Hand of the King, remarking that the appointment is intended to force Tyrion to make amends for his mistakes. Tyrion passes on to Jon the news that he is to be exiled to the Night's Watch again, and bids him farewell. Some time later, he presides over King Bran's first small council meeting.

=== Appearances in other media ===
In 2019, Peter Dinklage and Lena Headey appeared as Tyrion and Cersei Lannister alongside Elmo in a Sesame Street PSA on the importance of being respectful to one another, as part of Sesame Street's "Respect Brings Us Together" campaign.

=== Recognition and awards ===
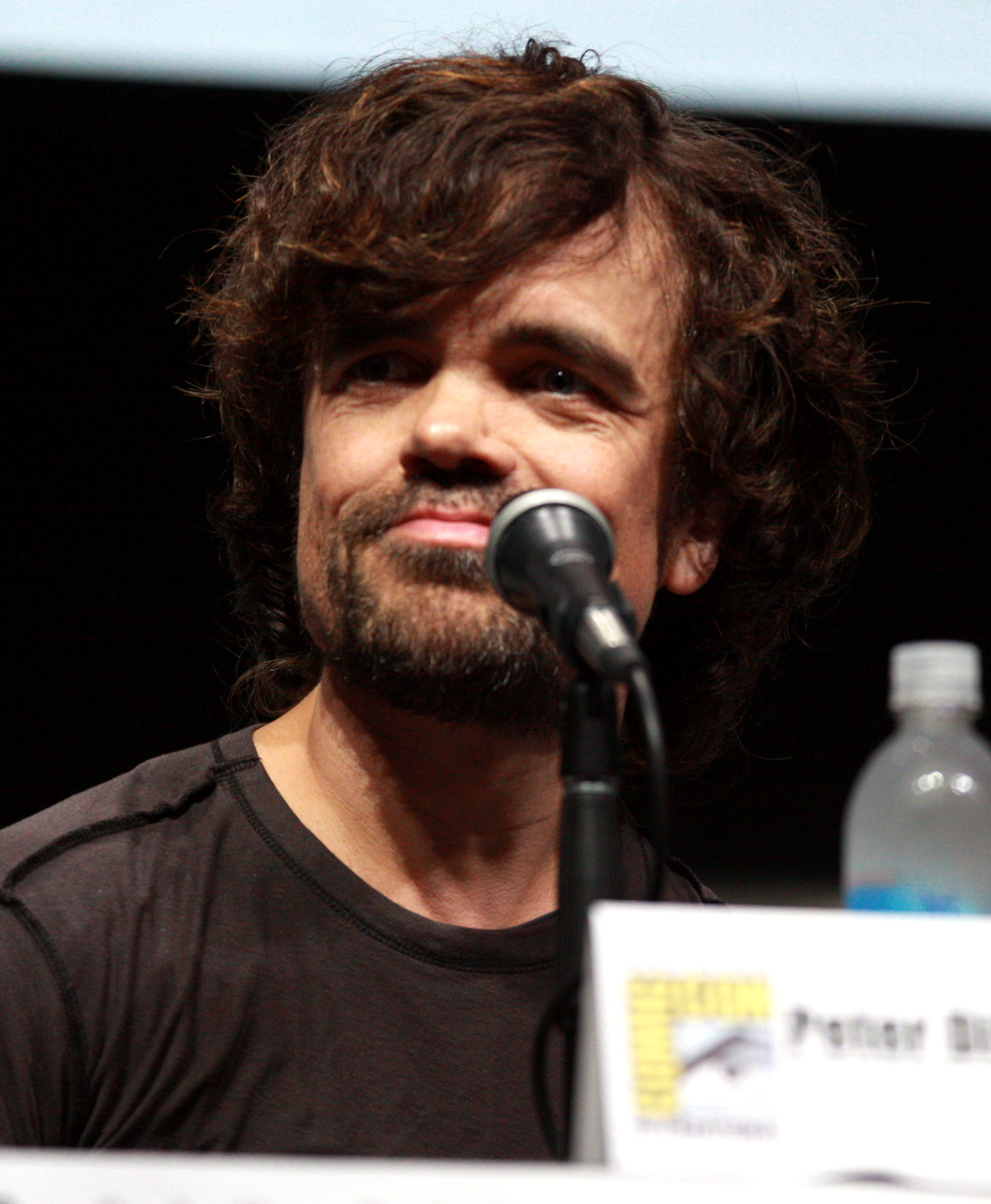
Peter Dinklage is the series's most successful cast member in terms of awards, having won 7 awards and received 37 additional nominations

Dinklage's performance was unanimously praised; The Boston Globe called his Tyrion one of the show's "highlights", adding that Dinklage "gives a winning performance that is charming, morally ambiguous, and self-aware." Matt Roush of TV Guide told viewers to "rejoice in the scene-stealing bravado of Peter Dinklage as the wry 'imp' Tyrion Lannister." The Los Angeles Times wrote, "In many ways, Game of Thrones belongs to Dinklage" even before, in Season 2, the "scene-stealing actor's" character became the series' most central figure. The New York Times noted that as beloved as the character of Tyrion is to the novels' fans, "Dinklage's sly performance has made Tyrion all the more popular." The Huffington Post called Tyrion the "most quotable" character on the HBO series, as well as one of the most beloved.

In April 2011 both the Los Angeles Times and Entertainment Weekly pronounced Dinklage worthy of an Emmy Award for his performance in Season 1. He subsequently received one for Outstanding Supporting Actor in a Drama Series, as well as a Golden Globe Award for Best Supporting Actor in a Series, Miniseries, or Television Film. He also earned a Satellite Award for Best Supporting Actor in a Series, Miniseries or Television Film and a Scream Award for Best Supporting Actor for Season 1 of Game of Thrones. Dinklage won the Emmy for Outstanding Supporting Actor again in 2015, and 2018.

Dinklage has been nominated for the Emmy four other times for playing Tyrion, in 2012, 2013, 2014, and 2016. He has received several other award nominations for his performance in the series, including the Critics' Choice Television Award for Best Supporting Actor in a Drama Series in 2012 and 2016; the Satellite Award for Best Supporting Actor in a Series, Miniseries or Television Film in 2012, 2015, and 2016; the Screen Actors Guild Award for Outstanding Performance by a Male Actor in a Drama Series in 2014, 2015, 2016, and 2017; the TCA Award for Individual Achievement in Drama in 2011 and 2012; and in 2011 both the IGN Award and the IGN People's Choice Award for Best TV Actor.

=== Merchandising ===
Among the various lines of Game of Thrones collectible figurines licensed by HBO, Tyrion has featured prominently, being dubbed one of the "heavy hitters", "fan favorites", "most-liked" and "most popular" characters.

Funko has produced two Tyrion figures as part of their POP! Television line. They are 4.5-inch (11 cm) vinyl figures in the Japanese chibi style, one depicting an early series Tyrion and a post-Season 2 version with a facial scar, "Battle Armor", and an axe. The company also produced a Mystery Mini Blind Box figurine of a stylized Tyrion. As part of their Legacy Collection line of action figures, Funko released a "Hand of the King" Tyrion, a Tyrion in armor with axe, as well as a Limited Edition "2014 San Diego Comic-Con Exclusive" armor version with a helmet. Threezero released a 1/6 scale 8.63-inch (21.9 cm) figure, and Dark Horse produced both a 6-inch (15 cm) figurine, and a 10-inch (25 cm) high-end statue for which the series' producers chose Tyrion as the subject.
