= A Spaceship Built of Stone and Other Stories =

1987 book by Lisa Tuttle

- Author: Lisa Tuttle
- Cover artist: Laura Knight
- Language: English
- Genre: Science fiction
- Publisher: The Women's Press
- Publication date: 1987
- Publication place: United Kingdom
- Media type: Print (Trade paperback)
- Pages: 192 pp
- ISBN: 0-7043-4084-4
- OCLC: 59252884
- Dewey Decimal: 813'.54[F]
- LC Class: PS3570.U8/

A Spaceship Built of Stone and Other Stories is a 1987 science fiction short story collection by Lisa Tuttle, her second after A Nest of Nightmares (1985). It was first published by The Women's Press, a specialized feminist publishing company, in their The Women's Press Science Fiction series.

The book contains Lisa Tuttle's Nebula Award winning story "The Bone Flute", a prize she refused.

== Contents ==
- "No Regrets" (1985) short story
- "Wives" (1979) short story
- "The Family Monkey" (1977) novella
- "Mrs T" (1976) short story (aka Mrs T.)
- "The Bone Flute" (1981) short story
- "A Spaceship Built of Stone" (1980) short story
- "The Cure" (1984) short story
- "The Hollow Man" (1979) novelette
- "The Other Kind" (1984) novelette
- "The Birds of the Moon" (1979) short story
