= Gabriel (novel) =

1987 novel by Lisa Tuttle

Gabriel is a novel by Lisa Tuttle published in 1987.

== Plot summary ==
Gabriel is a novel in which Dinah is a young woman whose husband Gabriel has died. Gabriel is depicted in flashbacks as a charismatic figure, reminiscent of Peter Pan. The story hints at reincarnation and focuses on small, relatable fears.

== Reception ==
Dave Langford reviewed Gabriel for White Dwarf #98, and stated that "Tuttle concentrates on small fears, things which (as opposed to the likelihood of putrescent zombies crawling from the toilet) do actually worry people: fear of embarrassment, of losing control, of doing something shamefully out of character."

== Reviews ==
- Review by Paul J. McAuley (1987) in Vector 139
- Review by David V. Barrett (1988) in Paperback Inferno, #72
- Review by David Kuehls (1988) in Fangoria, July 1988
- Review [French] by Evariste Blanchet (1992) in Yellow Submarine, #95
