= Animal Ark =

Children's book series

- Author: Lucy Daniels (in the UK), Ben M. Baglio (in the US)
- Country: United States, United Kingdom
- Language: English
- Genre: Children's books
- Publisher: Scholastic Corporation
- Published: 1994
- No. of books: 61

Animal Ark is a children's book series written by a collection of authors under the direction of Ben M. Baglio using the pseudonym Lucy Daniels starting in 1994. They have now been published in the US under the name Ben M. Baglio as a pseudonym for the authors who write the books. Each author is named with a 'Special Thanks' on the copyright page. The age the books are aimed at is usually agreed as 8 plus.

== Plot ==
The general plot of each book features Mandy Hope, the daughter of the local veterinarian, finding animals in trouble and trying to help them with the assistance of her best friend James, and other people in the village. Animal Ark is the name of the vet surgery.

The Animal Ark books have been adapted for a television series, and a magazine, Animal Ark, has been published to accompany the books. The magazine helps to support the Jean Byrd Animal Rescue and Education Centre near Shamwari, South Africa, through the Born Free Foundation.

== The books ==
Note: Editions for the United States are numbered differently from those of the United Kingdom. This is primarily because not all of the Animal Ark Series books were published in the United States.

The original Animal Ark Series consisted of 94 books written between 1994 and 2008. Although the majority of the stories centred around Mandy Hope and her parents vet practice, Animal Ark, in the village of Welford in Yorkshire, a number of stories took readers to other continents around the world. The original series also included a number of books labelled as Summer Specials or Holiday Specials. In fact, by late 2003, the Animal Ark Series was mainly publishing holiday specials including Valentine's Day, Easter, Halloween, and Christmas.

These were followed by an adult-oriented sequel and spinoff series starting in 2018 titled Hope Meadows. This series again follows Mandy, now an adult and a fully qualified vet, as she returns to Welford to help her parents run the surgery, following a disastrous relationship. This series focuses mainly on the romance genre, and, though animals still provide the main concern for Mandy, the situations they are in are considerably more graphic and darker in nature.

== Television series ==
A television adaption of the Animal Ark books was created and broadcast on CITV in the United Kingdom. Each episode covered a book, sharing its title and plot. The series ran for two seasons with a total of thirteen episodes, running from 4 September 1997 to 7 July 1998.

== See also ==
- Children's literature
- List of children's literature authors
- Publishers of children books
