= Lisa Tuttle =

American writer (born 1952)

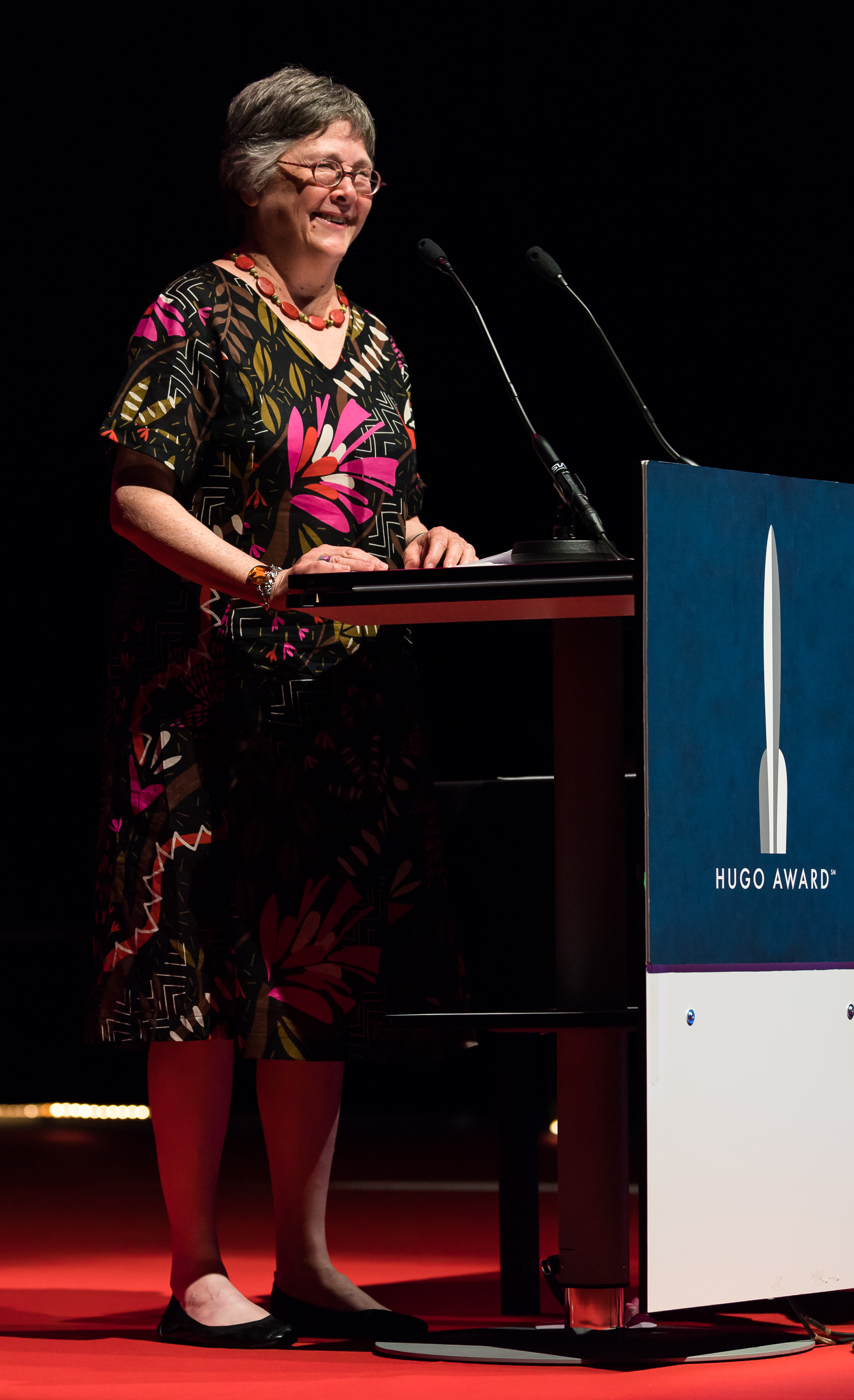
- Tuttle at Worldcon in Helsinki 2017
- Born: Lisa Gracia Tuttle; September 16, 1952 (age 74); Houston, Texas, U.S.
- Education: Syracuse University
- Occupation: Writer
- Spouse(s): Christopher Priest (1981–1987); Colin Murray (1990–present)
- Children: Emily
- Writing career
- Pen name: Maria Palmer, Ben M. Baglio, Lucy Daniels, Laura Waring
- Genres: Science fiction, fantasy, horror
- Subject: Feminism
- Notable awards: John W. Campbell Award for Best New Writer, Nebula Award (refused), BSFA Award
- Website: www.lisatuttle.co.uk

Lisa Gracia Tuttle (born September 16, 1952) is an American science fiction, fantasy, and horror author. She has published more than a dozen novels, seven short story collections, and several non-fiction titles, including a reference book on feminism, Encyclopedia of Feminism (1986). She has also edited several anthologies and reviewed books for various publications. She has been living in the United Kingdom since 1981.

Tuttle won the John W. Campbell Award for Best New Writer in 1974, received the 1982 Nebula Award for Best Short Story for "The Bone Flute", which she refused, and the 1989 BSFA Award for Short Fiction for "In Translation".

== Writing career ==
Lisa Tuttle began writing when she attended The Kinkaid School in Piney Point Village, Texas. At Lamar High School in Houston she was active in science fiction fandom, and founded and edited the Houston Science Fiction Society's fanzine, Mathom. At Syracuse University in New York, she wrote for the university's fanzine Tomorrow And…, plus several alternative newspapers. In 1971, Tuttle attended the Clarion Writer's Workshop, running that year at Tulane University in New Orleans, after which she sold her first short story, "Stranger in the House", which appeared in 1972 in Clarion II, an anthology edited by Robin Wilson. In 1974, Tuttle received a BA degree in English Literature and moved to Austin, Texas, where she worked as a journalist for five years at the Austin American-Statesman, a daily newspaper.

In 1973, Tuttle and several other science fiction writers, including Howard Waldrop, Steven Utley and Bruce Sterling, founded the Turkey City Writer's Workshop in Austin, Texas, and in 1974 she was joint winner of the John W. Campbell Award for Best New Writer with Spider Robinson. Tuttle collaborated with author and screenwriter George R. R. Martin on a novella, The Storms of Windhaven that was nominated for a Hugo Award in 1976. Tuttle and Martin later expanded the novella into a novel, Windhaven, which was published in 1981.

Over the next 25 years, Tuttle wrote a number science fiction and fantasy novels, including Lost Futures (1992), which was nominated for the Arthur C. Clarke and James Tiptree, Jr. Awards. She has also written young adult fiction and published several titles, including Catwitch (with illustrator Una Woodruff) (1983), Panther in Argyll (1996) and Love-on-Line (1998).

She has written under different shared house pen names with other authors for series of books. In 1987, she wrote the Casualty novelization Megan's Story under the name Laura Waring, Virgo: Snake Inside for a series of twelve young-adult books called Horrorscopes (1995) under the house pseudonym of Maria Palmer (although it was later reissued under her own name), and was a contributing author to Ben M. Baglio's Dolphin Diaries (2000–2002), a young-adult series of books, writing the first 8 books in the series, which were published as by Ben M. Baglio in the US and as by Lucy Daniels in the UK.

In addition to fiction, Tuttle has written non-fiction, including the Encyclopedia of Feminism (1986) and Writing Fantasy and Science Fiction (2002). As editor she has compiled several anthologies, including Skin of the Soul: New Horror Stories by Women (1990), and Crossing the Border: Tales of Erotic Ambiguity (1998), the latter covering the topic of genderbending.

Tuttle's fiction often focuses on gender issues and includes "strong-willed women" who question their identities. British author David V. Barrett wrote that her stories are "emotionally uncomfortable", and that "they not only make you think, they make you feel". Her science fiction works have been associated with feminist science fiction, and The Cambridge Guide to Women's Writing in English said that many of her stories use elements of science fiction and horror to "dramatize aspects of the human, and specifically the female, condition". It described The Pillow Friend as her "most satisfactory" novel, saying that it "trades more on ambiguities in its use of imaginary friends, phantom pregnancies and edible boyfriends".

Tuttle has taught writing at several institutions, including Clarion West and the Citylit College in London. She has also reviewed books for The Sunday Times. In 1989 Tuttle received the BSFA Award for Short Fiction for "In Translation". Her short story, "Replacements" was adapted for an episode of the Canadian horror TV series, The Hunger in 1999, and another story of hers, "Community Property" was the subject of a 2005 French short film, Propriété commune.

Her work appeared in The Guardian.

=== Nebula Awards refusal ===
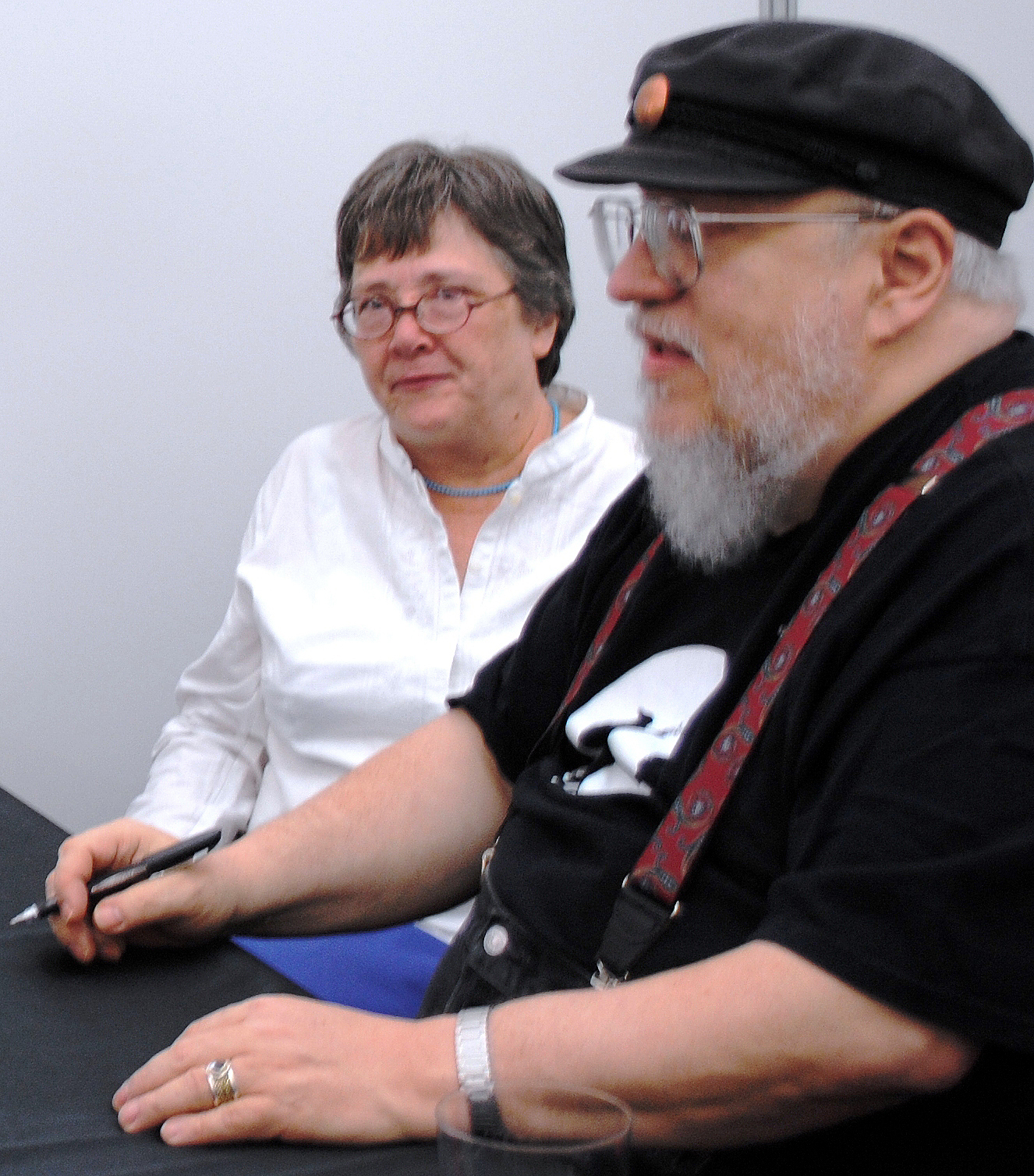
Tuttle with George R. R. Martin, 2012

In 1982, Tuttle became the first person to refuse a Science Fiction and Fantasy Writers of America Nebula Award. Her short story, "The Bone Flute", which had been published in May 1981 in The Magazine of Fantasy & Science Fiction, was nominated for the Nebula Award for Best Short Story in early 1982. She had objected to another nominee in this category, George Guthridge, sending his story "The Quiet", to SFWA members. Although this practice is now generally accepted, at that time it was seldom considered. SFWA had no rules about it. Tuttle wrote a letter to the Awards director Frank Catalano requesting that her story be withdrawn, saying, "I don't approve of this kind of campaigning". But "The Bone Flute" was chosen as the best short story before Catalano received Tuttle's letter, and when she was notified that she was the winner, she responded saying that she would not be accepting the award because she had withdrawn the story from the competition. Tuttle said that she would not be attending the awards ceremony on April 24, 1982, and requested that the reason for her refusal be given at the event. However, on April 29, 1982, Tuttle was contacted by Pocket Books's editor John Douglas, who told her that he had received her award on her behalf. No mention had been made at the ceremony of her refusal to accept the award.

Later, George R. R. Martin, with whom Tuttle had collaborated on Windhaven, wrote an open letter to the SFWA in which he said that, while he did not necessarily agree with Tuttle's decision to refuse the award, he objected to the way the organization handled her refusal. Martin wrote: "She has made a difficult and considerable sacrifice on grounds of principle, and [...] I feel very strongly that she had a right to be heard." When asked in an interview in 2003 whether she regretted declining the Nebula Award, Tuttle said, "I think my main regret is that people may assume that I object to awards on principle, and never nominate anything by me for anything again! I would love to win some awards, especially ones with money attached ..."

== Personal life ==
In the early 1970s, Tuttle was in a relationship with fellow science-fiction/fantasy author George R. R. Martin, with whom she co-wrote Windhaven. Tuttle lived with Steven Utley for several years before moving in January 1981 from the United States to London, England, where she married British writer Christopher Priest. After the marriage ended in 1987, she relocated to Torinturk in rural Scotland in 1990, where she currently lives with her second husband, editor Colin Murray, and their daughter, Emily.

== Bibliography ==
=== Novels ===
- Windhaven (1981, with George R. R. Martin):
  - The Storms of Windhaven (1975), reprinted as Storms
  - One-Wing (1980)
  - The Fall (1981)
- Familiar Spirit (1983)
- Catwitch (1983) (with Una Woodruff) — young-adult fiction
- Angela's Rainbow (1983) (with Michael Johnson)
- Gabriel (1987)
- Megan's Story (1987) (as Laura Waring) — book tie-in of the Casualty TV series
- Lost Futures (1992)
- Virgo: Snake Inside (1995) (as Maria Palmer, later issued under her own name) — young-adult fiction
- Panther in Argyll (1996) — young-adult fiction
- The Pillow Friend (1996)
- Love On-line (1998) — young-adult fiction
- Mad House (1998) — young-adult fiction
- My Death (2004) (novella) - republished by New York Review of Books (2023)
- The Mysteries (2005)
- The Silver Bough (2006)
- The Curious Affair of the Somnambulist and the Psychic Thief (2016)
- The Curious Affair of the Witch at Wayside Cross (2017)
- The Curious Affair of the Missing Mummies (2023)

=== Dolphin Diaries ===
(Series of children's books written by Tuttle but published under the house name Ben M. Baglio (USA) and Lucy Daniels (UK). The series was continued with two more books which were not written by Tuttle.)

- Into the Blue (2000)
- Touching the Waves (2000)
- Riding the Storm (2000)
- Under the Stars (2000)
- Chasing the Dream (2001)
- Racing the Wind (2001)
- Following the Rainbow (2001)
- Dancing the Seas (2002)

=== Story collections ===
- A Nest of Nightmares (1986)
- A Spaceship Built of Stone and Other Stories (1987)
- Memories of the Body: Tales of Desire and Transformation (1990)
- Ghosts and Other Lovers (2001)
- My Pathology (2001)
- Stranger in the House: The Collected Short Supernatural Fiction, Volume One (2010)
- Objects in Dreams (2012)
- The Dead Hours of Night (2021)
- Riding the Nightmare (2023)

=== Short stories ===
- “The Bone Flute” (1981), Nebula Award winner (declined).
- “The Curious Affair of the Deodand” (2011), in the urban fantasy anthology Down These Strange Streets, edited by George R. R. Martin and Gardner Dozois
- “The Curious Affair of the Dead Wives” (2014), in the cross-genre anthology Rogues, edited by George R. R. Martin and Gardner Dozois

=== Non-fiction ===
- Children's Literary Houses (1984) (with Rosalind Ashe)
- Encyclopedia of Feminism (1986)
- Heroines: Women Inspired by Women (1988)
- Mark Harrison's Dreamlands (1990) (with Mark Harrison)
- Writing Fantasy and Science Fiction (2002)

=== As editor ===
- Skin of the Soul: New Horror Stories by Women (1990)
- Crossing the Border: Tales of Erotic Ambiguity (1998)

== Awards ==
Work	Year & Award	Category	Result	Ref.
The Storms of Windhaven (with George R. R. Martin)	1976 Locus Award	Novella	Won	
The Storms of Windhaven (with George R. R. Martin)	1976 Hugo Award	Novella	Nominated	
The Storms of Windhaven (with George R. R. Martin)	1976 Nebula Award	Novella	Nominated	
Stone Circle	1977 Locus Award	Short Story	Nominated	
Stone Circle	1977 Nebula Award	Short Story	Nominated	
Woman Waiting	1977 Locus Award	Novelette	Nominated	
The Family Monkey	1978 Locus Award	Novella	Nominated	
One-Wing (with George R. R. Martin)	1980 Analog Award	Serial Novel/Novella	Won	
One-Wing (with George R. R. Martin)	1981 Hugo Award	Novella	Nominated	
One-Wing (with George R. R. Martin)	1981 Locus Award	Novella	Nominated	
Bug House	1981 Locus Award	Short Story	Nominated	
Treading the Maze	1981 BSFA Award	Short Fiction	Nominated	
The Bone Flute	1982 Locus Award	Short Story	Nominated	
Windhaven (with George R. R. Martin)	1982 Locus Award	SF Novel	Nominated	
No Regrets	1986 Locus Award	Short Story	Nominated	
In Translation	1989 BSFA Award	Short Fiction	Won	
Husbands	1991 Locus Award	Short Story	Nominated	
Lizard Lust	1991 Locus Award	Short Story	Nominated	
Skin of the Soul	1991 Locus Award	Anthology	Nominated	
Mark Harrison's Dreamlands (with Mark Harrison)	1992 Locus Award	Non-Fiction	Nominated	
Lost Futures	1992 Otherwise Award		Honor	
Lost Futures	1992 BSFA Award	Novel	Nominated	
Lost Futures	1993 Arthur C. Clarke Award		Finalist	
Lost Futures	2017 Premio Ignotus	Foreign Novel	Nominated	
Food Man	1995 Otherwise Award		Honor	
The Pillow Friend	1996 Otherwise Award		Honor	
The Pillow Friend	1996 International Horror Guild Award	Novel	Nominated	
The Pillow Friend	1997 Locus Award	Horror/Dark Fantasy Novel	Nominated	
The Mezzotint	2003 International Horror Guild Award	Short Fiction	Nominated	
My Death	2004 International Horror Guild Award	Long Fiction	Nominated	
My Death	2005 World Fantasy Award	Novella	Nominated	
My Death	2005 British Fantasy Award	Novella	Nominated	
Closet Dreams	2007 International Horror Guild Award	Intermediate Form	Won	
Closet Dreams	2007 Bram Stoker Award	Short Fiction	Nominated	
The Dead Hours of Night	2021 Bram Stoker Award	Fiction Collection	Nominated	
