= Liz Holliday =

British writer

- Born: London, England
- Occupations: Writer, Editor
- Writing career
- Period: 1980s-present
- Genres: Science fiction, fantasy, mystery
- Website: www.sff.net/people/Liz/

Liz Holliday is a British editor and writer of science fiction and mystery.

== Life and early career ==
Holliday has been a teacher and a youth leader, owned a bookshop and run a theatre company.

The Guinness Book of Records listed her for playing an 84-hour non-stop Dungeons & Dragons marathon.

== Literary career ==
Holliday edited the magazines Odyssey and 3SF, and was fiction editor for Valkyrie magazine for its first thirteen issues. She has written novelisations of British television programmes, including Cracker and Soldier Soldier.

Holliday's short stories have appeared in numerous anthologies and magazines, including Dragon. Her story "And She Laughed" was adapted for television as an episode of The Hunger in 1999.

Holliday has also written material for role-playing games such as Star Wars and Continuum.

== Bibliography ==
=== Short fiction ===
- "Third Person Singular" (Temps, Volume 1, 1991)
- "Blind Fate" (Weerde, Volume 1, 1992)
- "El Lobo Dorado Is Dead, Is Dead" (Temps, Volume 2: Eurotemps, 1992)
- "The Only Good Orc" (Dragon magazine, August 1993)
- "Cover Story" (Weerde, Volume 2: The Book of the Ancients, 1993)
- "And She Laughed" (London Noir; Serpent's Tail, 1994; reprinted in Year's 25 Finest Crime and Mystery Stories, 1995)
- "This Is the Universe" (The Ultimate Alien, 1995; reprinted in Futura magazine, 2005)
- "The Knight of Good Heart" (Tales of the Round Table, Past Times, 1997)
- "Burning Bright" (Decalog 4: Re-Generations, Dr Who Books, 1997) Earned a "year's best" honourable mention from Gardner Dozois.
- "Miri's Story" (Rath and Storm, Wizards of the Coast, 1998)
- "Provenance" (Royal Whodunnits, 1999)
- "Better Forget" (Cemetery Sonata, 1999)
- "By The Cold of the Moon" (Extreme Fantasy 2, 2001)
- "After Camlann" (Time After Time, 2005)
- "All of Me" (Aeon Magazine, August 2006) Earned a "year's best" honourable mention from Gardner Dozois.
- "Fletcher's Ghost" (Ages of Wonder, 2009)
- "Another Day" (Hardboiled Horror, forthcoming)

=== TV novelisations ===
- Cracker
  - One Day a Lemming Will Fly, published 1998, ISBN 0-312-18072-1
  - The Big Crunch, published 1995, ISBN 0-86369-965-0
  - True Romance, published 1995, ISBN 0-7535-0035-3
- Soldier Soldier
  - Tucker's Story
  - Damage, published 1995, ISBN 0-7522-0755-5
- Thief Takers
- Bramwell, published 1995, ISBN 0-7475-2681-8
- Bugs: Hot Metal, published 1996, ISBN 0-7535-0001-9
- Staying Alive
- Reckless
