= The Hunger (TV series) =

British/Canadian television horror anthology series

- DVD cover (1st season)
- Genre: Erotic horror
- Created by: Jeff Fazio
- Presented by: Terence Stamp (first season); David Bowie (second season)
- Countries of origin: Canada; United Kingdom
- Original language: English
- No. of seasons: 2
- No. of episodes: 44

Production
- Production locations: London, United Kingdom; Montreal, Quebec, Canada
- Running time: 26–28 minutes
- Production companies: Scott Free Productions; Telescene Film Group Productions; The Movie Network

Original release
- Network: Sci Fi Channel (United Kingdom); The Movie Network (Canada)
- Release: July 20, 1997 – March 5, 2000

The Hunger is a British/Canadian television horror anthology series, co-produced by Scott Free Productions, Telescene Film Group Productions and the Canadian premium television channel The Movie Network. It was created by Jeff Fazio.

Originally shown on the Sci Fi Channel in the UK and The Movie Network in Canada, the series was broadcast from 1997 to 2000, and is internally organized into two seasons. Each episode was based around an independent story introduced by the host; Terence Stamp hosted each episode for the first season, and was replaced in the second season by David Bowie. Stories tended to focus on themes of self-destructive desire and obsession, with a strong component of soft-core erotica; popular tropes for the stories included cannibalism, vampires, sex, and poison.

== Episodes ==
=== Season 1 (1997–1998) ===
No. overall	No. in season	Title	Directed by	Written by	Original release date	Prod. code
1	1	"The Swords"	Tony Scott	Howard A. Rodman, Robert Aickman (story)	20 July 1997	101
A man starts dating a nightclub star who can apparently survive being stabbed with swords. Travelling from LA to London to learn the ins and outs of his father's beauty company, a young man named James follows a poster on the wall of a club to a show starring a woman with the stage name Musidora who poses on stage while a sword is passed through her midriff. James leaves the show early, but the next day Musidora's manager offers James a private show. She visits him alone that night and strips for him, though makes a point that they are not to kiss each other on the mouth. James is reluctant to ask anything of her, but she insists she can't leave without pleasing him, whatever that entails. She even suggests he run a sword through her, explaining that she's under a spell which stops her feeling anything. James sleeps with Musidora, but doesn't go beyond that during their private meeting. However, he attends her next show and engages in on-stage swordplay with her, after which they begin a relationship. Musidora opens up to James and explains that the spell which protects her can never be challenged, or it may fail. They share a kiss on their next date, but James' commitment issues cause them to drift apart after this. One day, Musidora tries to tell James that she is going to prepare for what will be her last show, but he pretends to be asleep until she leaves. Once she's left, James notices that the bed they share is covered in blood and realises the spell must be broken. He rushes to the nightclub in time to see a heartbroken Musidora willingly get run through with a sword, killing her. Unable to stay in London after this, James returns to LA. Stars Balthazar Getty, Amanda Ryan, Timothy Spall, and Jamie Foreman.
2	2	"Ménage à Trois"	Jake Scott	Jordan Katz, Vincent Ngo, F. Paul Wilson (story)	20 July 1997	102
Steph, a nurse, is hired as a live-in caretaker at the opulent old home of Miss Gatty, a wheelchair-bound older woman who lives with her young, good-looking handyman Jerry. Jerry notes that her curt treatment of Steph is actually much better than the treatment her previous nurses received. Jerry is cold towards Steph, but Miss Gatty prompts her to try and connect with him and a tense relationship forms between them. One day, Jerry takes Steph down to the house's basement, where he reveals, to their shared amusement, Miss Gatty's collection of antique sex toys. Later, in Jerry's bedroom, Jerry tells Steph that Miss Gatty's last live-in carer killed herself. Before he can elaborate, Miss Gatty calls for Steph via an intercom system which runs throughout the house. Having administered Miss Gatty's nightly medicine, Steph goes to leave, but is asked to stay by Miss Gatty, who proceeds to hold both of Steph's hands in silence until it appears to Steph that Miss Gatty has made time stop. Back up in Jerry's room, an unusually sensual Steph appears and sleeps with him. The following morning, a visibly uncomfortable Steph rebuffs Jerry's attempt at intimacy in the kitchen before being called to Miss Gatty's side. Miss Getty takes Steph's hand again, and back in the kitchen Jerry is met by Steph, who engages in aggressive sex with him. This relationship continues until a distraught Jerry eventually realises that Miss Gatty is possessing Steph, at which point she beats him to death, explaining while she does so that both he and Steph are replaceable. Later, Jerry's replacement arrives at the house and is welcomed by the possessed Steph. Stars Karen Black, Lena Headey, and Daniel Craig.
3	3	"Necros"	Russell Mulcahy	Steven Salzburg, Audrey Salzburg, Brian Lumley (story)	20 July 1997	103
A beautiful young woman is the constant companion of an older man, but their relationship may not be what it seems. While on holiday to get over his ex-girlfriend, who cheated on him with another woman, a man named Billy learns from Dino, the head waiter at his hotel, of a local legend called "Necros", a dead being who supposedly consumes the life of its victims. The old man people believe is Necros is seen with a woman named Helma who appears much younger than him and, once the old man and Helma have parted company one evening to attend different events, Billy approaches Helma. They attend a street performance together where a man dressed as a saint and a man dressed as the devil fight each other and the audience bets on who will win. Helma bets on the devil winning and gets a lot of money when this comes true. While watching fireworks together later that night, Billy sees Helma give all of her winnings away to two children dressed as angels who are out canvassing for donations. Billy and Helma make plans to meet at his hotel, but arrive separately so as not to arouse suspicion. Billy is put off when, after buying him a drink, Helma leaves Billy for the hotel restaurant, where she joins the old man she was seen with earlier. Shortly after this, the old man finds issue with the spice level of the food he is served and demands that he and Helma leave, but, on her way out, Helma invites Billy to join her swimming. Billy arrives at the swimming pool to find the old man reading poolside while Helma is already in the water. When she finishes swimming, Helma joins Billy and reassures him that the old man, Nero, cannot see or hear them if they stand far enough away from him. She then explains that he pays for her lifestyle and in exchange Nero takes comfort in her youth. Helma claims Nero gave his youth away too cheaply, but doesn't elaborate before coming on to Billy. He hesitates and she leaves disappointed. Before he can follow her, Billy is approached by Nero, who espouses the virtues of the game Bridge as a replacement for sex before offering Billy the book he was reading, titled "Forever Bridge". The following morning, Billy extends his stay at his hotel and starts leafing through Nero's book. That night, Billy is dining in the hotel restaurant when he sees Nero and Helma at another table. Billy sees Dino and asks his thoughts on Bridge. Dino loudly proclaims that he loves the game and Nero is seen to take note of this. Complaining of boredom, Helma is sent home by a frustrated Nero but struggles to open his car in the rain. Billy follows her outside and helps her get inside the car, at which point they arrange to meet in private. Dino disappears later that night and the following morning Billy jokes that Nero has kidnapped him. Billy then gets in his car to go and visit Helma, but is startled when a dog jumps up on the hood of the vehicle before suddenly disappearing. Trying to brush this off, he drives to Nero's house, which he finds empty but for Helma. Billy mentions the locals' suspicions of Nero to Helma, who is unconcerned by this, saying she prefers them to be fearful than curious before leading Billy upstairs to consummate their affair. During foreplay, Billy comments on the unusual roughness of Helma's tongue before getting distracted by a strange growling coming from the next room of the house. As Helma's love-making grows more animalistic, Billy starts to notice oddities around the bedroom, such as an upside down crucifix on one wall and Nero appearing in a chair in the corner of the room. A black dog enters from the other room and sits beside Nero while Helma reveals a tail and extends her tongue several inches before inserting it into Billy's mouth, sucking the lifeforce from him and aging him rapidly in a matter of seconds. When Helma removes and retracts her tongue, Billy has become an old man. Helma wraps the aged Billy in the bedsheets and passes him to Nero, who happily comments that they now only need one more before they can start their game of Bridge. Nero carries Billy into a parlour where he seats Billy opposite an equally aged Dino and explains that, though Billy hasn't read enough of Nero's book to be prepared for the game yet, he will now have eternity to master Bridge. Stars Philip Casnoff, Céline Bonnier, and Leonardo Cimino.
4	4	"The Secret Shih-Than"	Russell Mulcahy	David Preston, Graham Masterton (story)	27 July 1997	104
A gourmet chef is offered a great deal of money to prepare a meal from a secret book, Shi-Than. Stars Jason Scott Lee, Gregoriane Minot Payeur, Kenneth Welsh, and Robert Ito.
5	5	"Bridal Suite"	Érik Canuel	Clair Noto, Graham Masterton (story)	3 August 1997	105
A newly-married couple on their honeymoon discover that the bed in their room is supposed to be cursed. Stars Sally Kirkland, Karen Elkin and Colin Ferguson.
6	6	"Room 17"	Érik Canuel	Craig Miller, Mark Nelson	10 August 1997	106
A man rents a motel room in order to watch some special erotic films privately. The man, Burt, turns on footage of a woman, Carla, lounging on a bed in lingerie. Burt amuses himself talking back to the woman's dirty talk, until she starts reacting to what he's doing, revealing that she isn't pre-recorded. Burt brings a motel employee into the room to explain what's going on, but the employee mistakes Burt's confusion for him just not enjoying Carla's video. The employee changes channel to a different erotic film and leaves Burt to it. Once the employee has left the room, the channel changes back by itself to reveal Carla again, who asks Burt how a relationship can grow between them without trust. Before he can answer, Burt is phoned at the motel by his wife, Shelly, who harangues him over the phone while Carla watches. After Burt angrily hangs up on his wife, Carla strips for Burt and then tries to convince him that she can please him from within the television by showing how much she knows about him: describing his life as an unsuccessful salesman along with a sexual fantasy he's never admitted to anyone, in which a woman licks whipped cream off his balls. Following this, Carla explains how she can see what happens in every room in the motel as long as it has a TV in it, and that another patron would make an excellent customer for Burt. Burt finds the potential customer in the motel bar and successfully makes a massive sale to him. To celebrate, Carla reaches out of the TV to perform fellatio on Burt. The next morning, Burt isn't able to find Carla on the motel TV anymore and assumes he dreamt her up. He returns home, jubilant, to reveal his success to Shelly. However, she doesn't believe he earned the money honestly and is angered further when she sees a hickey on Burt's neck. The two argue and Burt storms out of the house, returning to the motel where he gifts Carla a fur coat and the two have sex. To finish, she even fulfils Burt's secret fantasy. Afterwards, Carla suggests Burt should kill his wife so they can be together forever. Burt is hesitant at first, until Carla pushes him to think of any valuable belongings of Shelly's he might be able to sell if he did kill her, at which point he remembers a necklace of Shelly's which he believes is extremely valuable. Burt then sneaks into his home intending, on Carla's instruction, to strangle Shelly with the cord of their bedside phone, forgetting they own a cordless one. He improvises with the cord connecting the base of the phone to the wall and then brings Shelly's necklace back to the motel. Burt presents this to Carla, who is pleased until she tries to leave the TV and finds she can't. Her picture starts to distort and she appears to be in pain. In a panic, Burt leaves the necklace on top of the TV and rushes to the motel's office to get help. When Burt and the motel employee from before return to Burt's room, they find the necklace has disappeared and the footage of Carla is now clearly pre-recorded and not interactive. Only when the motel employee leaves does an interactive Carla reappear on the TV, now wearing Shelly's necklace. Carla implies that she's told the police about Burt's murdering of his wife and, in a rage, he attacks the TV, seemingly dying in the process. Some time later, we see a wealthy man named Charles checking into an upmarket hotel. On the bellboy's suggestion, he tries the erotic film channel on the television in his room and is greeted by Carla who, to his surprise, addresses him directly. Stars Curtis Armstrong, Kim Feeney, and Penny Mancuso.
7	7	"Anaïs"	Darrell Wasyk	Terry Curtis Fox, Graham Masterton (story)	17 August 1997	107
An architect spends his time fantasizing about a made-up woman he calls "Anaïs" but the imaginary woman begins to have real desires. Stars Ilona Elkin and Nick Mancuso.
8	8	"No Radio"	Howard A. Rodman	Marianne Ackerman, Mickey Friedman (story)	24 August 1997	108
A kidnapper gets more than he expected when he abducts his married lover. Stars Bruce Ramsay, Amanda De Cadenet and James Rae.
9	9	"But At My Back I Always Hear"	Patricia Rozema	Marianne Ackerman, Patricia Rozema, David Morrell (story)	31 August 1997	109
A professor is stalked by a young female student. A man, Frank Ingram, works anxiously on a laptop in a motel before a flashback shows us the events which lead him there. A professor at the University of Chicago, he was visited one day in his office by an intense female student, Sam Perry, whom Frank hadn't previously noticed was in his class, but who has strong opinions on what and how he teaches. Under the impression that he wants to date her, Sam asks Frank if they're now going to get coffee together following this meeting. The professor turns her down, unsure where she got that impression from and, confused and disappointed, Sam leaves his office. After Sam's departure, another professor warns Frank that she's the daughter of a diplomat and very intelligent, but someone you should be wary of. That night, Frank has an intense dream about having sex with Sam and is awoken from it by a phone call from Sam, which his wife, Jean, answers. She passes the phone to Frank and Sam explains over the phone that Frank called to her that night. Frank tells Sam she should seek help and hangs up in frustration, reassuring his wife that he has no interest in anything besides their relationship. The next day, Frank arrives at his office to find Sam waiting for him on the floor outside it. She follows him into his office and berates him, claiming she's only doing what he told her to do. Frank refutes this and calls security to remove Sam from his office. When security arrives, Sam announces she's moving to California and storms out of the room. After not hearing from Sam for a month, Frank is interrupted one evening at home by a call from her in which she tells him she's picked up his new messages; that she hears his voice all the time and is driving back from California to be with him. Frank tells her to remain in California and she retorts that he could teach her things, implying that he should. At this, he hangs up on her. Another night, during a dinner party, Frank and his friends discuss Sam's case, though Frank initially presents it as if Sam is obsessed with someone else and not him. One of his friends quickly sees through this and advises Frank directly to avoid being alone with Sam, also warning him that Sam may target his wife and baby. Frank discusses with the police the possibility of a restraining order, but they say Sam hasn't done anything serious enough to warrant one yet. Sam harasses Frank over the phone again, this time threatening his wife and child while Jean is in the room. When she realises she's being threatened, Jean grabs the phone off him to speak to Sam herself, but hears only a dial tone. Frank claims Sam must have hung up. We then see Sam sat alone listening to the dial tone of a phone held to her ear. An hour after this phone call, Frank and Jean argue over the fact that Frank was her professor when they started dating and that he cheated on her with a baker two years prior to this, breaking the trust in their marriage. This argument is interrupted by furious knocking at their front door from the Chicago PD, who inform the Ingrams that Sam committed suicide two days ago. Jean and the police officer realise Frank is hallucinating the phone calls, but he denies this and, instead of going to bed, takes to his laptop to record what's happened to him, working through the night. The next morning, the Ingram household receives a phone call which Jean answers. She hears only a dial tone, but Frank takes the phone off her and hears Sam calling out for him. In a craze, Frank announces that he and Jean have to split up, for her safety and that of their child. He sets off across the country, but at each motel he stops in he receives what he believes are phone calls from Sam. Eventually, he returns to his now-empty house and smashes up all the phones he finds within. Frank believes he has finally fixed the problem until, in the distance, he hears another phone ringing. Stars Cary Lawrence, Michael Gross and Karen Elkin.
10	10	"Red Light"	Christian Duguay	David J. Schow	21 September 1997	110
A supermodel refuses to be photographed because she is convinced that the camera will steal her soul. Backstage at a fashion show, supermodel Natasha is hounded by photographers to the point of hiding in her trailer. The next day, a professional photographer returns to his apartment to find a piece of chewing gum left on the doorhandle of his apartment door. This prompts him to check the building's elevator, where he finds Natasha, an old acquaintance of his who's looking for physical intimacy. The two proceed to have sex in the elevator. Afterwards, the two spend time together in the man's apartment, where Natasha notes that the photographer doesn't display any pictures of her, despite displaying many of his other works. The two consider one photo of a fearful-looking older woman and the photographer mentions it's the best quality shot he could get of her. Natasha muses that the old woman would have, correctly, been afraid the camera would steal her soul. The photographer grows frustrated with Natasha for not having contacted him for six years and then suddenly showing up when she needed somewhere to hide from the world. He tells her that, after she left him, it took him a year to get back on his feet and even then never again reached the artistic highs he'd achieved before. Natasha explains that she really reappeared in his life to experience some certainty before she disappears, then breaks down in tears and the photographer comforts her. While they relax together later, the photographer tries to photograph Natasha, but she makes him promise to never take a photo of her again. He promises not to, but then starts photographing her once she's fallen asleep. When Natasha wakes up, the photographer hides the fact he photographed her. She mentions that she had a bad dream that someone was photographing her, which concerns her as each photograph taken takes a part of her. The following morning, while collecting coffee, the photographer is approached by a man, Reece, who's trying to track Natasha down. The photographer feigns ignorance of her whereabouts, but Reece impresses upon him the value a nude photo of Natasha would have. Reece also notices that the photographer is carrying two coffees back to his apartment, but doesn't press him on this. Back in his apartment, the photographer starts to develop the photos he took of Natasha, but she interrupts him and stops the process. He tries to reassure her that he took the photos to prove to her that they aren't taking her soul, but she doesn't believe him. Natasha warns the photographer that stealing someone's soul makes you a thief, and that this holds its own consequences, before she rushes out of the apartment. Outside the building, Natasha runs into Reece and a group of photographers who all start taking endless photos of Natasha. The photographer rushes into the street after her and, upon seeing him, Reece asks if he got the nudes they discussed. Hearing this, Natasha becomes overwhelmed with grief and, as photos continue to be taken, she explodes into dust which quickly disappears. The photographer is never able to recover from this loss, learning too late that his sorrow is the consequence of stealing that Natasha tried to warn him about. Stars Tomas Arana and Liliana Kamorowska.
11	11	"I'm Dangerous Tonight"	Russell Mulcahy	Gerald Wexler, Cornell Woolrich (story)	21 September 1997	111
A red dress by a famous fashion designer causes strange behavior in the people who wear it. Stars Marie-Josée Croze, Dorothée Berryman and Esai Morales.
12	12	"The Sloan Men"	Darrell Wasyk	Bruce Smith, David Nickle (story)	28 September 1997	112
Through a shocking revelation by her future mother-in-law, a young woman comes to realize her fiancé and his father are not exactly human. Stars Clare Sims, Gregory Calpakis and Margot Kidder.
13	13	"A Matter of Style"	John Hamilton	David Shore	26 October 1997	113
A young inept burglar is bitten by a beautiful vampiress, who tries to teach him how to be a vampire. Stars Daniel Brochu, Chad Lowe and Isabelle Cyr.
14	14	"Hidebound"	Jeff Fazio	Gerald Wexler, Gemma Files (story)	23 January 1998	114
A young female security guard is attacked by a murderous spirit visible only to her. Stars Brooke Smith and Paul Hopkins.
15	15	"Fly-By-Night"	Yermo Mishot	Terry Curtis Fox, Gemma Files (story)	31 January 1998	115
A mental patient haunted by horrible wartime flashbacks gets shut up by a vampire. Stars Giancarlo Esposito and Kim Feeney.
16	16	"A River of Night's Dreaming"	John Warwicker	Bruce Smith, Karl Edward Wagner	6 February 1998	116
A female convict escapes from a prison transport and hides at the home of an elderly woman. Stars Marni Thompson and Ann Turkel.
17	17	"The Lighthouse"	Darrell Wasyk	Bruce Smith, Robert Bloch (story)	20 February 1998	117
A lighthouse-keeper, trapped at his post during a hurricane, begins to question his sanity. Stars Bruce Davison and Vlasta Vrána.
18	18	"The Face of Helene Bournouw"	Robert Ciupka	Harlan Ellison (as Cordwainer Bird)	27 February 1998	118
A reporter investigates a woman whose beauty literally drives men mad. A heart surgeon rushes out of his apartment onto a busy city street, screaming for a woman named Helene, seen walking away from him unperturbed as he commits suicide. Next, a painter, Quentin, is seen destroying all of his art until his muse, Helene, walks out of his art studio, prompting him to attempt suicide. This attempt is unsuccessful and a reporter, Strike, meets with a recovering Quentin to see if he ever painted Helene. When pressed for any information he can give about Helene, Quentin silently shows a desire to draw something for the reporter. Meanwhile, a distraught woman is shown driving in a car with Helene. When the car slows, Helene exits the vehicle and at this loss the woman, a UN envoy, walks into traffic. Strike struggles to convince his paper's editor to run his story on the mysterious Helene based on what he's found so far, eventually revealing Quentin drew him a lead: a picture of a parking garage. The reporter finds the parking garage and spies Helene driving out of it. He follows in his own car as she travels to the apartment of a successful architect. While Strike tries to climb the fire escape of the building to reach the architect's apartment, Helene interrupts the architect from a phone call he's having in order for them to have sex. The reporter, sat on the fire escape, sees Helene having sex with the architect, during which Strike starts to see himself in place of the architect. When this has finished, Helene breaks up with the architect and in response he throws himself to his death out of his apartment window. Strike returns to the parking garage in search of Helene and tries to break in, but is interrupted by police officers who tell him the garage has been abandoned for a decade. The police arrest him, assuming he's intoxicated in some way and imagining Helene, but Helene is indeed inside the parking garage. Strike's editor bails him out of jail and, through further investigation, he discovers that Helene's surname is Bournouw and that her car is registered to a church that burned down under mysterious circumstances. He suspects she somehow influenced the man who burned the church down, as this would make all of her targets experts in their fields, and returns to the parking garage again to continue his search for Helene. This time, Strike makes it inside and finds in there five rows of televisions stacked on top of each other. The first four rows show the four victims of Helene we've already seen, but the fifth row only shows static. Strike sees Helene stood in front of the screens and she promises him extreme experiences if he joins her, complaining that she didn't like her previous victims' work. She suggests that the world runs better on mediocrity than excellence. Strike asks if he can approach Helene and see what she really looks like, and she commends him for changing from a washed-up tabloid reporter to someone who will report on something truly special: her. Helene steps away from Strike into an elevator which is unusually ornate for the building they're in and beckons him to join her. As he stands in the doorway of the elevator, Strike sees Helene's face constantly shifting, each of her features changing to what the observer might like the most. Helene offers her hand to Strike, but when he reaches out to take it, he instead finds himself falling down an empty elevator shaft, Helene and the elevator nowhere to be seen. All five rows of screens from before now show Strike's terrified face as he falls towards camera. Stars Stephen McHattie and Jayne Heitmeyer.
19	19	"Plain Brown Envelope"	Michel David	Terry Curtis Fox, Lyn Wood (story)	6 March 1998	119
On a cold and snowy night, a young hitchhiker stows away in the back of a large truck that turns out to be the warehouse of a sex fantasy salesman. Stars Jesse Borrego, Doris Milmore and Stephan Cloutier.
20	20	"The Other Woman"	George Mihalka	David Taylor, Lois Tilton (story)	20 March 1998	120
The mistress of a married man has visions of being murdered by his wife. Stars Joanna Cassidy, Nicholas Campbell and Lisa Bronwyn Moore.
21	21	"Clarimonde"	Tom Dey	Gerald Wexler, Théophile Gautier (story)	20 March 1998	121
A strange beautiful woman seems to get a thrill from seducing men about to become priests. Stars David La Haye and Audrey Benoit.
22	22	"Footsteps"	Jimmy Kaufman	Gerald Wexler, Harlan Ellison	27 March 1998	122
A lovely vampiress who seduces and drains a different man every night meets a man who claims to be a vegetarian. An American woman, Claire, is pursued through an alleyway in Berlin by a group of men with flashlights before escaping in a taxi and heading to Paris by plane. She hopes to find better food in France than she has found in several other countries. In a Parisian bar, Claire observes the various male patrons before striking up a conversation with a mell-meaning, middle-aged local who she convinces to take her out to dinner. During the bread course, the man excuses himself to take a phone call with his family, which Claire interrupts, hanging up the phone and leading him into a store room before transforming into an unseen creature and eating him alive. The next day, Claire meets a man in an art gallery and they discuss the difference between being lonely and being alone. Claire comments that, though she's never been lonely, she does know what it means to be alone before she convinces him to take her back to his apartment. There, the two have sex before she transforms again and kills him. After some time spent enjoying her Parisian meals, Claire starts to grow paranoid, expecting people to start chasing her again as they did in the other countries she's visited. She's frightened by two police officers on the street one day until it becomes clear they're chasing someone else. Seeing this reaction from Claire, a young French woman approaches her to check if she's ok and ends up asking Claire out on a date to a nightclub. Claire and the woman dance together at the nightclub until they're approached by a man who draws Claire away and who Claire ends up going home with instead. In his apartment, Claire discovers the man is a vegetarian, his explanation being that plants are glad to be eaten, unlike animals. She tearfully starts kissing him, upset because, although he is different to her other victims, she still needs to kill and feed from him. However, when she tries to transform, the man is able to stop her, revealing that he is able to do so because he's the last of a plant-based humanoid species. The two, both the last of their kind, spend the night together. Before falling asleep, Claire, once again fearful of being caught for her past crimes, thinks she hears footsteps outside, but the man assures her they will pass without incident. The next morning, the man works to move Claire to a vegetarian diet, but, while trying to engage with this, Claire gets distracted by the man's cat running through the apartment. She excuses herself and eats the cat in private. Stars Jean-Guy Bouchard and Sofia Shinas.

=== Season 2 (1999–2000) ===
No. overall	No. in season	Title	Directed by	Written by	Original release date	Prod. code
23	1	"Sanctuary"	Tony Scott	Bruce M. Smith	10 September 1999	023
A successful but unbalanced artist takes in a young and seriously wounded drifter who is on the run and looking for a place to hide. Stars David Bowie, Giovanni Ribisi and Richard Jutras.
24	2	"Skin Deep"	Luke Scott	Christa Faust (Story); Bruce M. Smith (Teleplay)	17 September 1999	028
A lonely woman seeks comfort with a sadistic lap dancer. Stars Kate Vernon and Sarain Boylan.
25	3	"The Dream Sentinel"	Chris Hartwill	Poppy Z. Brite (Story); Gerald Wexler (Teleplay)	24 September 1999	026
The ghost of a murdered detective seeks solace with a young stripper, who is mourning the death of her ex-lover. Stars Eric Roberts and Alice Poon.
26	4	"And She Laughed"	Jean Beauchemin	Liz Holliday (Story), Jeff Fazio (Teleplay)	3 October 1999	039
A woman's nightmares about a Peeping Tom become real. Stars Ben Bass and Jennifer Beals.
27	5	"Nunc Dimittis"	Russell Mulcahy	Tanith Lee (Story), Gerald Wexler (Teleplay)	10 October 1999	029
Princess Dracula's dying faithful companion tries to fulfil his last wish: find his own successor. Stars David Warner, Philippe Ross, Jacob Tierney and Marina Orsini.
28	6	"Week Woman"	Daniel Grou	Kim Newman (Story); Terry Curtis Fox (Teleplay),	17 October 1999	033
A newlywed is disturbed by his wife's inexplicable mood swings, so he decides to do something about it. Stars Martin Watier and Brooke Smith.
29	7	"The Night Bloomer"	Érik Canuel	David J. Schow (Story), Mark Nelson (Teleplay)	24 October 1999	036
A corporate researcher offers to help an ambitious businessman advance his career, but he's unaware of the price. Stars Glenn Plummer, Gillian Ferrabee and Serge Houde.
30	8	"The Diarist"	Alain DesRochers	Gemma Files	31 October 1999	041
A witch with a penchant for vengeance is romantically spurned by a man and decides to get even with him by casting evil spells to ruin his life and possibly bring him under her spell. Stars Sheena Larkin and Ian M. Watson.
31	9	"Sin Seer"	Daniel Grou	David Fletcher (Story); Peter Lankov (Teleplay)	7 November 1999	044
Mano is a man who has a unique gift - he can look into people's eyes and see their darkest secrets. For years, he has avoided eye contact with people but, for even longer, he has avoided mirrors... but what should happen if he looked into one? Stars Robert Brewster and Brad Dourif.
32	10	"Triangle in Steel"	Adrian Moat	Thomas Raddall (Story); Gerald Wexler (Teleplay)	14 November 1999	034
A young man goes to work at a steel mill with Native Americans, and becomes involved with the boss's wife. Stars George Gilbert Scott, Joe McComber and Victoria Sanchez.
33	11	"Brass"	Jeff Fazio	David J. Schow (Story); Jeffrey Cohen (Teleplay)	21 November 1999	032
When a young man inherits an ornate mirror following the death of his Satanist father, he finds that it reveals his mother attempted use of black arts. As the dead man's son continues his father's work, he puts the lives of those around him in danger, particularly when he forges a link to Hell through the power of the mirror. Stars Max Martini, Polly Shannon, Richard Normand, and Philip Pretten.
34	12	"Replacements"	Bruce M. Smith	Lisa Tuttle (Story); Bruce M. Smith (Teleplay)	28 November 1999	038
A doctor becomes determined to find out what is happening to the women in his town, after they appear to be turning against the men and becoming obsessed with something unknown. They seem to have found animalistic replacements for their husbands. Stars Howard Rosenstein.
35	13	"I'm Very Dangerous Tonight"	Alain DesRochers	Cornell Woolrich (Story); Terry Curtis Fox (Teleplay)	2 January 2000	025
A dress causes strange things to happen to every person that wears it. Stars Martin Simms.
36	14	"Wrath of God"	Russell Mulcahy	Bruce M. Smith (Teleplay), Gemma Files (story)	9 January 2000	024
A landlord is visited by a powerful stranger who wants to observe evil in all its forms. Stars Anthony Michael Hall.
37	15	"Bottle of Smoke"	Jean Beaudin	Gemma Files	16 January 2000	043
When an elderly woman, who travelled widely in her youth, dies, she leaves her possessions to her young niece, which includes a bottle of smoke that promises the ultimate in sexual fulfillment. But such pleasure comes at a price. Stars Soo Garay and Cathy Moriarty.
38	16	"The Perfect Couple"	Darrell Wasyk	David J. Schow (Story); Gerald Wexler (Teleplay),	23 January 2000	031
A modern-day cupid arranges for two people to come together and believes them to be the perfect match. Four years later, though, he revisits them to see how they fared and finds their relationship is troubled. Was his mistake just that... Or is his poor matchmaking deliberate? Stars Claudia Besso, Aldo Tirelli and Noël Burton.
39	17	"The Sacred Fire"	Russell Mulcahy	Charles de Lint	30 January 2000	040
Luann is a kind and generous woman who volunteers to help the homeless find food and shelter, but when she meets Nick, who lives on the street, he warns her that there are street people who are actually demons in disguise, intent on killing humans. Stars Kim Huffman and James Marshall.
40	18	"Approaching Desdemona"	Jason Hreno	Lenny Kleinfeld (Story); Terry Curtis Fox (Teleplay)	6 February 2000	027
In a story that will be familiar to many Internet users, a couple's life together deteriorates when he finds an adult website that offers bizarre sexual fantasies. Stars Christina Colburn, William McNamara and April Telek.
41	19	"The Seductress"	Alain DesRochers	Ramsey Campbell (Story); Mark Nelson (Teleplay)	13 February 2000	030
When a novelist reads a suicide note from a former lover, she begins an affair with a mysterious man, but their romance is not all it seems and the boundaries between reality and fiction appear to fall away. Stars William Katt, Laura Mitchell and Rachel Hayward.
42	20	"Double"	John L'Ecuyer	Karl Edward Wagner (Story); Bruce M. Smith (Teleplay)	20 February 2000	042
The myth of the Doppelgänger has lasted for centuries and receives a modern updating here as two identical women meet but realise the differences between them are in their personalities - one is normal whilst the other is plagued by nightmares. Their meeting, however, results in a battle for their souls. Stars Lori Petty, Daniela Akerblom, Larry Day, and Rachelle Lefevre.
43	21	"The Falling Man"	Daniel Grou	Bruce M. Smith (Teleplay); David J. Schow (Story)	27 February 2000	035
A muse inspires a gifted young architect, but she exacts a terrible price from him when he fails. Stars Maria Bertrand and A Martinez.
44	22	"The Suction Method"	Darrell Wasyk	Rudy Kremberg (Story); Gerald Wexler (Teleplay)	5 March 2000	037
A middle-aged married man cheats on his wife with the carpet cleaner lady. But there's a bigger story behind the mysterious lady---she's there to get the unwanted "dirt" out of the house. Stars Fisher Stevens, Jeannie Walker and Valérie Valois.

== Production ==
Initially like the movie from which it takes its name, the series was going to focus exclusively on vampires but producers opted to expand the scope of what Hunger entailed to allow for more storytelling options.

== Home video releases ==
Region 1

Entertainment One released both seasons on DVD in the US in 2009. Season 1 was released on 2 June 2009, and Season 2 on 13 October 2009.

Alliance Home Entertainment has released the entire series on DVD in Canada for the very first time.

Region 2

Infinity Video released both seasons on DVD in the UK for the very first time on 31 October 2005, as Amazon exclusives. Season 1 and 2 were re-released as full retail releases in 2007.

DVD Name	Ep#	Release Dates		
DVD Name	Ep#	Region 1 (US)	Region 1 (CAN)	Region 2
Season 1	22	2 June 2009	8 June 2010	23 July 2007
Season 2	22	13 October 2009	8 June 2010	23 July 2007

== See also ==
- "Replacements" by Lisa Tuttle (adapted as episode 12 of season 2)
- Alcoa Presents: One Step Beyond
- The Outer Limits
- Night Gallery
- Tales from the Crypt
- The X-Files
- List of horror television programs
