= Replacements (short story) =

Short story by Lisa Tuttle

- Short story by Lisa Tuttle
- Country: United States
- Language: English
- Genre: Science fiction

Publication
- Media type: Print
- Publication date: 1992

"Replacements" is a short story by American writer Lisa Tuttle. It concerns a husband's surfacing insecurities as his wife's independence strengthens when she claims a bloodsucking pet for her very own.

Tuttle declared in an interview with M. M. Hall from Fantastic Metropolis: "My first post-natal story to deal in any way with motherhood was “Replacements”, written when my daughter was only seven months old. Make of that what you will…".

Since its first release in 1992, "Replacements" has been extensively republished, both in Tuttle's own short story collections and numerous writers' anthologies. It was also included in various "best of" anthologies in the year.

== Summary ==
As Stuart commences his walk to work, he notices an animal "about the size of a cat, naked looking, with leathery, hairless skin and thin, spiky limbs that seemed too frail to support the bulbous, ill-proportioned body." Disgusted and horrified by the appearance of this animal, he crushes it with his foot. Immediately, he is remorseful, and his first instinct is to call his wife, Jenny. Since he is not sure what her reaction will be, he waits to call her at the normal time in the afternoon. She is not able to take his call and does not return the call either. Stuart calls again, only to find that she has left work early. This, being unlike her, worries Stuart, and he returns home as soon as possible.

Once home, he finds that Jenny brought one of the "creatures" with her. Stuart shows a strong dislike towards the creature and wants Jenny to get rid of it. The two argue about what to do with Jenny's new "pet" but never come to a resolution. The creature begins taking up more of Jenny's time and attention. She also does abnormal activities with the creature (letting it drink blood from her). As this progresses, Stuart is regarded less and less and becomes very distanced from Jenny. Eventually, Jenny says that she is going to keep it whether Stuart likes it or not. Stuart then decides that he cannot live with the creature and the woman Jenny has become, and he moves out.

He begins to notice these creatures more and more. The women at work, women on the streets – every woman he sees seems to have one of these creatures. One evening, while on his way home from work, he notices a woman sitting opposite with a gold chain that brings back memories. After leaving the train at the same stop as the woman, he strives to come up with something to say, but he sees the chain linked to one of the "pets" he despises and immediately lets her walk away. He absentmindedly walks to his old house, where he sees Jenny's creature longing to be outside and he longing to be in.

== Adaptations ==
The story was adapted for the 12th episode of The Hunger season 2, also titled "Replacements" (28 November 1999).
