= The Bone Flute =

- Short story by Lisa Tuttle
- Ebook cover
- Country: United States
- Language: English
- Genre(s): Science fiction

Publication
- Published in: The Magazine of Fantasy & Science Fiction
- Publication type: Periodical
- Publisher: Mercury Press
- Media type: Magazine
- Publication date: May 1981

"The Bone Flute" is a science fiction short story by American writer Lisa Tuttle, first published in the May 1981 issue of The Magazine of Fantasy & Science Fiction. The story won the 1982 Nebula Award for Best Short Story, a prize that Tuttle refused, becoming the first (and as of 2025, only) author to do so.

== Plot summary ==
The story begins in a bar called The White Bird. There, the unnamed female protagonist, a trader, meets Venn, an aspiring musician. They become lovers and the protagonist takes him to planet Habille, where she has trading businesses to do and he expects to find inspiration for new music. Habille is a planet that was colonized centuries ago and cut off all relationships with other planets, but has recently rejoined galactic society and has become open to trade.

Once on Habille, the protagonist and Venn's relationship suffers due to difficulties from the protagonist shifting her attention to her work, and Venn's lack of inspiration in the dull, oppressive city. In an attempt to save the relationship, they move to a village. There, they meet Reni Laer, a musician who plays soul-stirring music with a strange instrument. After listening to his music, the pair meet Wara Duleen, a music student, that explains that the instrument Laer was playing was a flute made of a bone of his dead wife.

The protagonist leaves for three weeks due to some work commitments. When she returns, she finds Venn has abandoned her. She confronts him and learns he's now in love with Wara Duleen. Ten years later, the protagonist learns that there's a musician from Habille doing a concert at the hotel where she's staying. There, she meets Venn and Wara Duleen in a way she least expected to.

== Nebula Award refusal ==
In 1982, the story was selected as one of the finalists for the Nebula Award for Best Short Story. Tuttle became aware that writer George Guthridge, also nominated in that category for his story "The Quiet", was campaigning his story by sending out copies of it to SFWA members with a covering letter written by The Magazine of Fantasy & Science Fiction editor Ed Ferman at his request.

Disapproving this situation, Tuttle sent a letter to Nebula Awards director Frank Catalano, asking to withdraw her story from the competition as a sign of protest, her complaints being that the awards weren't making sure that all items up for consideration were sent around to all the voters, also asking to disqualify works which were campaigned for by either the authors or the editors. If these requests were not considered, she considered the whole Nebula Awards a farce in which she did not want to be involved.

Her letter however came too late (reportedly because Tuttle wasn't aware she had been nominated until very late), and Catalano called her to announce she was the winner. She refused the award, saying that she had withdrawn it from the competition. Catalano passed her request to other members of the SWFA board, and Charles L. Grant called Tuttle to announce that she was indeed the winner and that they wouldn't retire the story from competition. Tuttle still refused the award, and asked Grant that her reasons for refusing be made clear at the awards ceremony, which she didn't plan to attend, a request that Grant assured her would be granted.

At the ceremony, however, editor John Douglas accepted the award on her behalf and no comment was made on Tuttle's reasons for her refusal.

== Print history ==
Perhaps due to this controversy, the story hasn't been widely republished after its first appearance. Tuttle did not allow the story to be included on that year's Nebula Awards anthology compiling the nominated and winning short stories. It has only been reprinted twice in the original language: on Tuttle's anthology of science fiction stories A Spaceship Built of Stone and Other Stories, and a 1995 various authors anthology titled Lost In Space. A Danish translation (entitled "Benfløjten") was published in "Forum Fabulatorum" (ISSN 0108-6715) no. 2, March 1983.

In 2011, the story was reissued as an ebook, with a specially-written afterword by Tuttle regarding the Nebula awards situation.

== Sources ==
- Clute, John and Peter Nicholls. The Encyclopedia of Science Fiction. New York: St. Martin's Griffin, 1993 (2nd edition 1995). ISBN 0-312-13486-X.
