= Windhaven =

1981 novel by George R. R. Martin and Lisa Tuttle

- First edition
- Author: George R. R. Martin, Lisa Tuttle
- Cover artist: Vincent Di Fate
- Country: United States
- Language: English
- Genre: Science fiction
- Publisher: Timescape Books
- Published: 1981
- Media type: Print (hardcover and paperback)

Windhaven is a science fiction fix-up novel by American writers George R. R. Martin and Lisa Tuttle. The novel is a collection of three novellas compiled and first published together in 1981 by Timescape Books. It was published as a mass market paperback in 1982 by Pocket Books. Both editions featured cover art by Vincent Di Fate. It was later reprinted by Bantam Spectra in hardcover in 2001, and paperback in 2003 and 2012, with cover art by Stephen Youll. The novel was also published in paperback form in the UK by New English Library in 1982 and Gollancz in 1988.

Windhaven was nominated for a Locus Award for Best Science Fiction Novel in 1982, and finished in second place in that year's Locus Poll.

== Writing process ==
Martin and Tuttle became friends in 1973, and soon decided to collaborate on a story, which became the first of the three novellas, The Storms of Windhaven (included in the novel as "Storms"). During the conception and writing of the story, they agreed on eventually expanding it into a fix-up novel. The Storms of Windhaven was originally published in the May 1975 issue of Analog Science Fiction and Fact. It won the 1976 Locus Award for Best Novella, and was nominated for both the Hugo Award for Best Novella and Nebula Award for Best Novella.

The two writers eventually returned to the world of Windhaven, and the second novella, One-Wing, was originally published in two parts in the January and February 1980 issues of Analog. It was nominated for a 1981 Hugo Award for Best Novella and won the Analog Readers Poll for best serial.

The third novella, The Fall, was written specifically for inclusion in the expanded novel, along with a prologue and epilogue.

Two more books were planned, with Painted Wings as the intended title of the second, but Martin and Tuttle never found the right time for additional collaboration, and as they grew older, their writing styles became more distinct, making cooperation more difficult.

== Plot ==
=== Background ===
The novel recounts events which occur on the fictional planet Windhaven. Its inhabitants are the descendants of human space voyagers who crash-landed on Windhaven centuries before the events of the book take place. After the crash, the survivors spread out and settled on the many scattered islands of Windhaven's waterworld. In order to preserve tenuous lines of communication across the vast seas, the stranded population constructed mechanically simple gliding rigs from available spaceship wreckage; the gliders could be kept aloft almost indefinitely in Windhaven's stormy atmosphere by their pilots. After centuries of using this practice as the principal means of maintaining social contact among the islands, Windhaven's flyers have developed into a caste superior to the landsmen. Additionally, the flyer caste maintains ownership of the flying rigs — commonly known as "wings" — by keeping them within flyer families, so none of Windhaven's landsmen can aspire to ever wear them. These caste-based differences serve as the impetus for the novel's character-driven narrative.

=== Prologue ===
Maris is a young peasant girl who lives with her mother on the remote island Lesser Amberly. Her father, a fisherman, was killed an unspecified number of years before and Maris hardly remembers him. Though Maris and her mother survive mostly as scavenging "clam-diggers", they also collect refuse that washes onto the nearby beaches after violent coastal storms. Early one morning, Maris and her mother rise from bed and scour the beaches near their hovel for valuables after a particularly brutal tempest. Maris's search is largely fruitless and she recovers little. Afterward, however, she has a pivotal encounter with one of Windhaven's resident flyers.

Lesser Amberly itself is home to three flyers, one of whom, an adult male named Russ, lands on the shore near where Maris has concluded her search. Maris timidly approaches Russ and, during the chance meeting, he treats her with kindness and she, in turn, reveals to him that her most ardent wish is to become one of Windhaven's flyers.

=== Part 1: Storms ===
Maris, now a young adult, has been adopted by Russ who, because of a serious injury, was forced to give up his life as a flyer. Customarily, flyer-wings pass to the oldest child of an established flyer. At the time of Russ's injury, however, Russ and his wife had no children. So Russ, in response to Maris's enthusiasm, trained her and then granted her the right to wear his wings. Since then, Maris has been acting as one of Lesser Amberly's three resident flyers by ferrying messages between Windhaven's far-flung colonies across the oceans. But, shortly after Maris was entrusted with the wings, Russ's wife gave birth to a son, Coll. Coll has just turned 13, and it is traditional that at 13, young flyers "come of age" and replace their parents as the ceremonial owners of the family wings. In this case, Coll is set to take Russ's wings back from Maris, as her claim to them is unlawful. However, Maris strongly desires to keep the wings for a number of reasons, not the least of which is that Coll has failed to prove that he is, or ever will become, a competent flyer. Additionally, unbeknownst to Russ, it is actually Coll's dream to become a traveling singer. Things are further complicated because Maris loves Coll both as a sister and as a mother — the latter being a role she gradually took on after Russ's wife died in giving birth to Coll. Maris, knowing that her desire to keep the wings is unrecognized by the ancient "flyer code", ultimately wants Coll to fulfill his dream of becoming a singer.

On the day Coll is to officially take the wings, he commits a grievous piloting error and lands badly in front of Maris, Russ and many of the important citizens of Lesser Amberly. Coll then refuses to take over stewardship of the wings, and he reveals to Russ that he will pursue a life as a singer and musician. Russ responds by angrily disowning both Maris and Coll, and the wings are confiscated by one of Lesser Amberly's other flyers, Corm. Corm soon lets it be known that he intends to give the wings to a flyer from a neighboring village, as he maintains that Maris never had a claim on the wings to begin with. Maris decides she must act quickly if she is to have any chance to get the wings back. In the night, she steals the wings from Corm and flies to another island. There she hands the wings over to the flyer Dorrel. Maris intends to have Dorrel call a "flyer's council" — a rare meeting of nearly all of Windhaven's flyers — in order to prove that she deserves the right to wear the wings. However, a flyer arrives and notifies Dorrel that Corm has already called for a council to be held. Soon after, at the council, Corm argues that Maris should be declared an outlaw and exiled. But Maris responds to Corm's attacks skillfully, convincing the other flyers that the family-based system of wing inheritance is unfair and archaic. The council then votes in favor of measures allowing for the creation of flyer academies, where any of Windhaven's citizens may learn to fly, and an annual flying competition, during which aspiring flyers will be allowed to compete for a chance to win their own wings from flyers. The council also grants Maris's request to keep Russ's wings.

=== Part 2: One-Wing ===
Several years later, Maris attempts to help people without flyer lineage, or "one-wings", train for the chance to compete for their own wings. Maris's loyalties to old friends often make her choices difficult, but she remains determined to push for more change and a fair chance for one-wings in Windhaven's society. As a result, she spends most of her spare time at Woodwings, the first flyer academy built after the historic council decision. Early on, Maris learns that the last of the other flyer academies has been closed because of a tragic accident. She is also told that one of its students is journeying to Woodwings in order to continue training. When Maris meets the student, Val, she realizes that he is the original "one-wing", a now-infamous peasant man who won a set of wings away from one of Maris's oldest friends, a female flyer who belonged to a venerated flyer family, in one of the first yearly competitions. However, at the time the competition was held, the flyer Val challenged was still mourning the recent death of her brother. Val's challenge was thereby regarded by the flyer community as being both dishonorable and despicable. Tragically, the defeated flyer killed herself after losing her wings to Val. Though Val lost the wings after being beaten by another flyer at the following year's competition, he quickly proves his competence at Woodwings and becomes close friends with one of the most promising students, a southern-born female one-wing named S'Rella. Val and S'Rella, along with four other students of lesser skill, will fly in the coming flyer's competition. Assisting the students in the competition amongst her old friends forces Maris to face her previously unnoticed preconceptions, loyalties and double-standards in flyer society. After successfully beating a competent flyer-born in the first two trials, Val is seriously beaten and injured on the last day, preventing him from competing. Maris, who has come to respect Val, and the rights of any flyer to compete with another, flies proxy in his place and wins his wings from Corm. S'Rella also wins her own wings against Maris' long-time friend Garth, whose health was failing.

=== Part 3: The Fall ===
Now an older woman, Maris attempts to fly in a storm and has a nearly fatal fall on the Island of Theos. She awakes in the home of the local healer, Evan, and over the course of a few months impatiently awaits the recovery of her legs and left arm. She can finally walk again but learns that her head injury will prevent her from flying, and her wings are taken away from her and given to her home island. In her grief, she attempts to distance herself from other flyers and the burgeoning one-wing culture. She denies her previous flyer identity and attempts to immerse herself in the work of physician's assistant for Evan, now her romantic partner. Maris' brother, Coll, and his young daughter arrive and stay with them for awhile, a theme in this chapter explores the depths of relationship that Maris has never experienced as a flyer who never grew roots in any community, life as a "land-bound." However, Maris is urged to return to the center of the flyer world as an intermediary between the one-wings and flyer-born when a one-wing flyer, imprisoned by the powerful island landowner, is hanged for a controversial crime. Maris blames herself for failing to lend her aid to avoid the execution of this flyer, and so uses her new community ties to scheme with the flyers. They create a growing circle of one-wing flyers dressed in black circling the sky over the site of the execution in mourning and protest. She employs the power of the singers to tell the story of the wrongful execution and to paint the lands-man as a villain. She successfully gains cooperation between the one-wings and the flyer-born factions to come together as flyers and resolve the conflict peacefully, forcing the harsh and greedy lands-man out of power. Maris learns to balance her identity and community and chooses to stay with Evan instead of returning to teach young flyers at the academy, and likewise Evan surprises her by choosing to face his fears of leaving his only home to go with her so she could be where she was truly needed.

=== Epilogue ===
A dying Maris receives a singer at her bedside. She recites to the singer the words of a song written by her brother, Coll, who had died some years before. The song is Coll's last testament to Maris.

== Graphic novel adaptation ==
In 2018, Bantam Books released a Graphic Novel adaptation of the book, adapted by Tuttle, with sequential art by Elsa Charretier and colors by Lauren Affe.
