= A Nest of Nightmares =

1986 collection of horror stories

- Author: Lisa Tuttle
- Publication date: 1986
- ISBN: 0-7221-8649-5

A Nest of Nightmares is a collection of horror stories by Lisa Tuttle published in 1986.

== Stories ==
A Nest of Nightmares consists of 13 horror stories, all with female protagonists.

- Bug House
- Dollburger
- Community Property
- Flying to Byzantium
- Treading the Maze
- The Horse Lord
- The Other Mother
- Need
- The Memory of Wood
- A Friend in Need
- Stranger in the House
- Sun City
- The Nest

== Reception ==
Dave Langford reviewed A Nest of Nightmares for White Dwarf #78, and stated that "Tuttle writes well and knows just how to push the gooseflesh button. I'd say more, but it's difficult to type while trembling under the bedclothes." Jessica Amanda Salmonson described it as "the most significant book of its kind to take a consistently feminist approach to horror fiction".

== Reviews ==
- Review by Stephen Jones (1986) in Fantasy Review, September 1986
- Review by Alan Fraser (1986) in Paperback Inferno, #62
- Review by Neil Gaiman (1986) in Vector 134
- Review by Don D'Ammassa (1987) in Science Fiction Chronicle, #95 August 1987
- Review by Robert Holdstock (1988) in Horror: 100 Best Books
