= Ben M. Baglio =

American writer

Ben M. Baglio (born 1960 in New York City, U.S.) is an American author who created the brief for two series of children's books – Dolphin Diaries and Animal Ark. Dolphin Diaries features a girl and her family from Florida, who travel around the world as marine biologists and study dolphins. Animal Ark features Mandy Hope, whose parents are vets; she helps injured animals and solves animal-related mysteries. The books were written by commissioned writers in the Canada under Baglio's instruction and published using the pseudonym Lucy Daniels in the UK. Each author is named with a "Special Thanks" on the copyright page – see the Dolphin in the Deep copyright page for an example. In the U.S., the books are published under the name of Ben M. Baglio so this name is effectively both of the actual creator of the series and also the collective pseudonym for the group of writers who write the books.

Using his pen name he also wrote the book series The Pet Finders Club, featuring a group of three children who search for people's cute lost pets.

== Dolphin Diaries ==
In Dolphin Diaries, a girl named Jody McGrath discovers and befriends a friendly bottlenose dolphin whom she names Apollo. He is a lone dolphin and Jody united him to his "new" pod and follows her for a while through the series. As the story proceeds, she meets others along the way. She befriends many new people and dolphins.

Other characters in Dolphin Diaries are Brittany Pierce, Captain Pierce, Cameron Tucker, the tutor Maddie, her twin brothers Sean and Jimmy, her mother Gina who is Italian, and her father Craig who is Irish.

=== List of books ===
1. Into the Blue (written by Ben M. Baglio)
2. Touching the Waves (written by Ben M. Baglio)
3. Riding the Storm (written by Ben M. Baglio)
4. Under the Stars (written by Ben M. Baglio)
5. Chasing the Dream (written by Ben M. Baglio)
6. Racing the Wind (written by Ben M. Baglio)
7. Following the Rainbow (written by Ben M. Baglio)
8. Dancing the Seas (written by Ben M. Baglio)
9. Leaving the Shallows (written by Ben M. Baglio)
10. Beyond The Sunrise (written by Ben M. Baglio)

== The Pet Finders Club ==
In The Pet Finders Club, a girl named Andie Talbot has moved to Radcliffe, Greater Manchester, England, from Texas, United States of America. She has a Jack Russell Terrier named Buddy, who escapes from the house during a thunderstorm and gets lost. While trying to find him, Andie befriends Tristan Saunders, a red-haired boy who has a long-lost cat named Lucy, and he helps her look. They also manage to find a lost Black Labrador, which belongs to fashion-conscious Natalie Lewis, and the three of them form The Pet Finders Club after Buddy is found. Together they track down many missing pets, and even missing owners. There is even a burglary at their local pet shop, Paws for Thought, which is owned by Tristan's mother's cousin, Christine Wilson.

=== List of books ===
1. Come Back, Buddy!
2. Max is Missing
3. Looking for Lola
4. Rescuing Raisin
5. The Dog with No Name
6. Searching for Sunshine
7. Disappearing Desert Kittens
8. Dachshund in Danger
9. Runaway Rascal
10. Help Honey

== Animal Ark ==
In Animal Ark, Mandy Hope and her friend James Hunter help helpless and injured animals throughout the series, and sometimes she helps perished animals on a "mission". Her parents, Adam and Emily Hope, are vets in Animal Ark (the veterinary practice that gives the series its name), which comes in handy in helping the animals she comes across. Mandy has three rabbits, Flopsy, Mopsy, and Cottontail. She is definite that she will become a vet and help sick animals in need. Other characters are Simon, a fellow nurse, and Jean Knox, the receptionist. There is also a black Labrador named "Blackie" that belongs to Mandy's friend and behaves very manic, and also sometimes goes on the adventures. Mandy finds that many people are actually very fond of animals and have a heart of solid gold. When she isn't working with animals, she is helping her parents with their work.

== Jess the Border Collie ==
In Jess the Border Collie, 11-year-old Jenny Miles lives on her family's farm, Windy Hill, which is a working sheep farm, with no room for pets. When one of her father's newborn puppies are born with a bad leg, it's up to Jenny to convince her dad that the puppy, whom she names Jess, is worth saving. Soon, Jess is making himself useful, helping Jenny, helping the farm, and helping the neighbours.

1. The Arrival
2. The Challenge
3. The Runaway
4. The Betrayal
5. The Sacrifice
6. The Homecoming
7. The Discovery
8. The Gift
9. The Promise

== Other books ==
Baglio has also contributed one title, The First Olympics, to the Choose Your Own Adventure gamebook series. Baglio also wrote the Horseshoe Trilogies and the Nine Lives Trilogy.
