= Johnny Flynn =

British actor and musician (born 1983)

- Flynn in 2026
- Born: 14 March 1983 (age 43); Johannesburg, South Africa
- Occupations: Actor; musician
- Years active: 2005–present
- Spouse: Beatrice Minns (m. 2011)
- Children: 3
- Father: Eric Flynn
- Relatives: Lillie Flynn (sister); Daniel Flynn (half-brother); Jerome Flynn (half-brother)
- Website: johnny-flynn.com

Johnny Flynn (born 14 March 1983) is a British actor and musician. He starred as Dylan Witter in the Channel 4 and Netflix television sitcom Lovesick and is also known for his performances as David Bowie in the 2020 film Stardust; Mr. Knightley in the 2020 film Emma; and a young Nicholas Winton in the 2023 film One Life. He plays villain Frankie Cooper in the crime series MobLand.

Flynn is the lead singer and songwriter of the band Johnny Flynn & the Sussex Wit. He has released six studio albums, as well as soundtracks and live albums. He also composed and sang the theme song for the comedy series Detectorists.

== Early life and education ==
Flynn was born on 14 March 1983 in Johannesburg, South Africa, the son of Eric Flynn, a British actor and singer, and Caroline Forbes. He has a younger sister, Lillie Flynn, who sings with the Sussex Wit.

From his father's first marriage he has two older half-brothers, actors Jerome Flynn and Daniel Flynn, and an older half-sister, Kerry Flynn.

At the age of 4, he moved with his family to the UK. Flynn won a music scholarship to Pilgrims School, an independent school in the city of Winchester in Hampshire, where he sang in the chapel choir. Because of his scholarship, he was required to learn two instruments: the violin and trumpet. Later, he taught himself guitar and won a second music scholarship to Bedales School, another independent school in Hampshire. He next went to Webber Douglas Academy of Dramatic Art to study acting.

At the age of 3, Flynn was attacked by a Staffordshire Bull Terrier in South Africa resulting in facial scars.

== Acting career ==
=== Film and television ===
Flynn had parts in the television series Murder in Suburbia, Holby City and Kingdom. He rose to fame in his starring role of Dolf Vega in the film Crusade in Jeans (2006).

In 2011, Flynn's music was used in the film A Bag of Hammers. In 2013, Flynn was cast in Song One, a film starring Anne Hathaway. Flynn plays a musician by the name of James Forester, who becomes involved with Hathaway's character, following an accident involving her brother.

In 2014, Flynn played the lead role of Dylan in the rom-com television series Scrotal Recall which aired on Channel 4. After finding success on Netflix, the streaming network went on to commission a second series of 8 episodes, without Channel 4's involvement, which was made available globally on the streaming network in November 2016 under the new name Lovesick. The show's third series arrived on Netflix on 1 January 2018.

In 2015, he starred in the Comedy Central sitcom Brotherhood, as one of two adult brothers who have to raise their younger brother when their mother unexpectedly dies. It was billed as the British version of the US sitcom Two and a Half Men.

In 2017, he played the younger Albert Einstein in National Geographic's show Genius. Also in 2017, he played Pascal Renouf, a secretive outsider suspected of a series of brutal murders in director/writer Michael Pearce's debut dark thriller Beast, which premiered at the Toronto International Film Festival and was released in the UK on 27 April 2018.

In 2018, Flynn played William Dobbin in the ITV and Amazon Studios television serial adaptation of Vanity Fair. He also played Felix Tholomyès in the BBC miniseries adaptation of Les Misérables.

In 2019, he starred as David Bowie in the drama Stardust, based on a screenplay by Christopher Bell and directed by Gabriel Range.

In early 2020 he starred in a heist musical starring Will Poulter and Naomi Ackie, titled The Score. In 2020, he starred in Emma, Autumn de Wilde's adaptation of Jane Austen's novel of the same name, alongside Anya Taylor-Joy, Bill Nighy, and Josh O'Connor. He wrote the song played over the ending credits, "Queen Bee," which was released as a single alongside the film.

The film Operation Mincemeat, in which Flynn played author Ian Fleming, was released in 2021. Also in 2021, he co-starred in another British film The Dig, which was released on Netflix on 29 January 2021. He plays the character of Rory Lomax.

In 2022, he had a major role in The Outfit, alongside Mark Rylance.

In 2023 he portrayed Nicholas Winton as a young man in the film One Life.

He played Dickie Greenleaf in the 2024 Netflix series Ripley, opposite Andrew Scott.

Flynn plays villain Frankie Cooper in series two of crime drama MobLand.

Flynn is set to star in the upcoming historical fiction survival thriller A Prayer for the Dying.

On 9 June 2025, it was announced that Flynn would star as Lucius Malfoy in the upcoming Harry Potter TV series.

=== Stage ===
Flynn performed in Propeller's all-male Shakespeare troupe, playing Curtis (The Taming of the Shrew) and Sebastian (Twelfth Night) in the 2007 season.

He has also performed in several other plays, including Richard Bean's play The Heretic at the Royal Court Theatre (2011). Flynn was cast in the role of Lee in Jerusalem, Jez Butterworth's hit play, for which he was nominated for an Olivier Award for best supporting actor.

In summer of 2012, Flynn appeared in Shakespeare's Globe Theatre's productions of Richard III, as Lady Anne, opposite Jerusalem co-star Mark Rylance and then as Viola/Cesario in the Globe's production of Twelfth Night with Rylance as well. The productions transferred to the Apollo Theatre in the West End until February 2013. In March 2013 Flynn played the lead role in Bruce Norris' play The Low Road at the Royal Court.

In September 2015 he played Mooney alongside David Morrissey and Reece Shearsmith also at the Royal Court in Martin McDonagh's new play Hangmen. He joined the transfer to London's West End at Wyndham's Theatre later that year until March 2016. During this run the play was recorded and broadcast for National Theatre Live. He reprised the role again in the 2018 Off-Broadway production in New York at the Atlantic Theatre.

In November 2018 until February 2019, Flynn starred as Lee in the West End Premiere of Sam Shepard’s play, True West. The production was recorded as an audio play, released by Audible, which features original music by Flynn.

In 2023, Flynn played actor Richard Burton in The Motive and the Cue, a new play by Jack Thorne and directed by Sam Mendes at London's National Theatre. The story of how Burton and John Gielgud clashed as they staged Hamlet on Broadway in 1964, the production received rave reviews, particularly the performances of the two leads. It was recorded and broadcast in March 2024 for National Theatre Live during its West End run at Noël Coward Theatre.

== Music ==
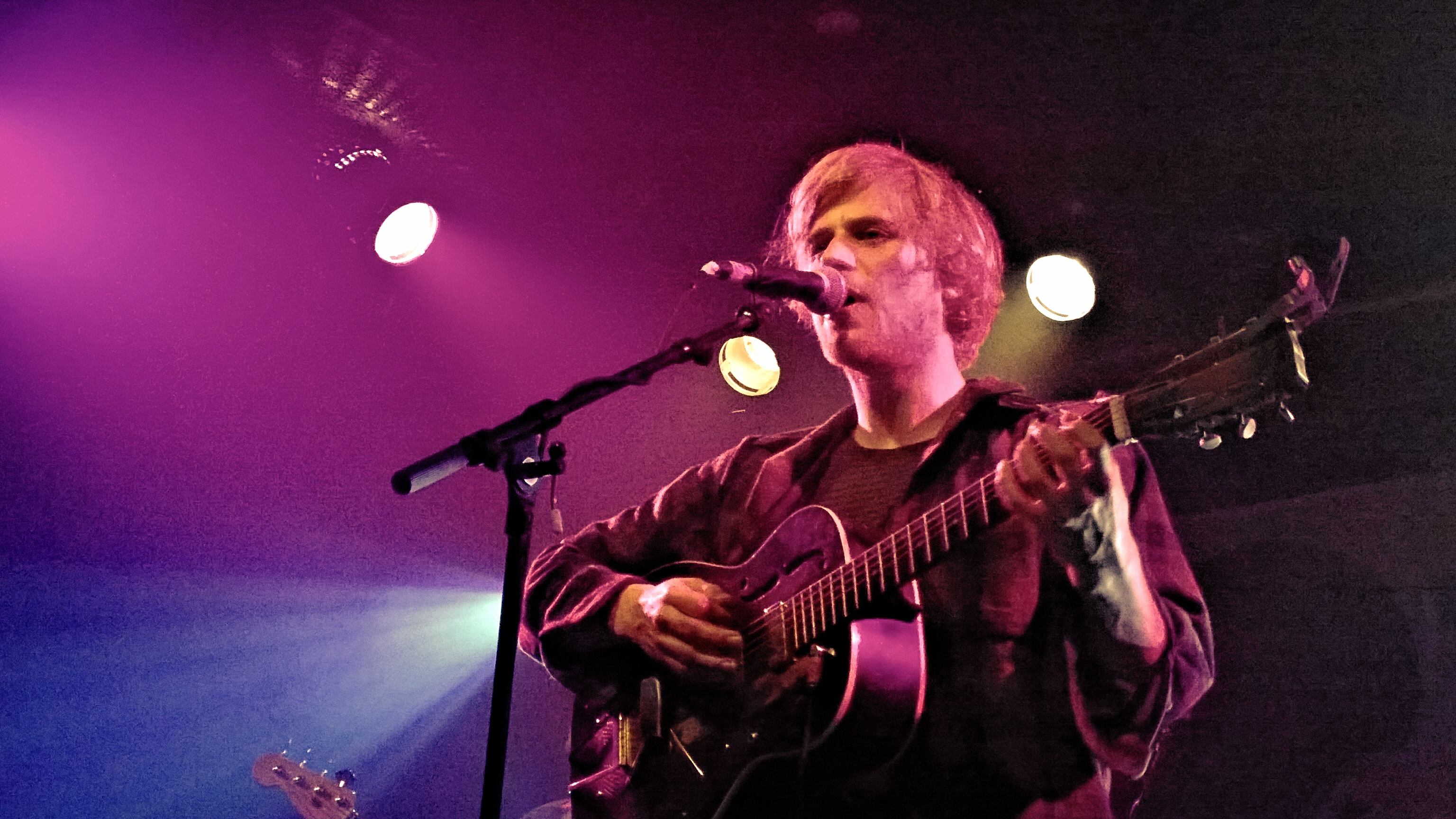
Flynn performing in 2014

Flynn has released several studio albums featuring folk revival songs of his own composition. He released his debut, A Larum, in 2008, and received critical acclaim. His second album Been Listening featured a duet with fellow British folk musician Laura Marling on the track "The Water". This was followed by Country Mile in 2013 and Sillion in 2017. Aside from Been Listening, each of Flynn's albums has charted in the top 100 in the UK. In May 2021, Flynn released Lost in the Cedar Wood, a collaboration with nature writer Robert Macfarlane. The album was influenced by the ancient Mesopotamian poem the Epic of Gilgamesh. In November 2023, Flynn and Macfarlane released a second album, The Moon Also Rises.

Flynn has also written musical scores for films, television shows, and theatre productions. This includes writing the film score for the 2012 film A Bag of Hammers, and the score and theme song of the BBC Four television series Detectorists, which he performed in a cameo appearance as a performer at an open mic night in series one, episode three. In 2015, he also composed the music (on period instruments) for the Globe Theatre's production of As You Like It.

Flynn's version of "Rambleaway" appeared on Shirley Inspired..., a 2015 tribute album to British folk singer Shirley Collins.

Flynn and Joe Zeitlin are the theme music composers for the 2019 Netflix TV Mini Series, The Last Czars.

He co-wrote the song Coins for Eyes with Robert Macfarlane for the 9th series of the BBC archaeology programme Digging for Britain.

Flynn performed Song with No Name at the U.K. national commemoration for the 80th anniversary of D-Day, which took place at the British Normandy Memorial in Ver-sur-Mer, Normandy, France on 6 June 2024.

In 2024, Flynn and Joe Zeitlin composed the score for the Audible original The Mysterious Affair at Styles, as well as the second adaptation in this series from Audible, The ABC Murders in 2025.

Teaming up with his sister Lillie, Johnny & Lillie released on 6 November 2026 the album Beam Cottage via label Transgressive Records. It contains some cover versions (Hank Williams, Billy Bragg and Paul Simon among others) and own compositions. The name Beam Cottage refers to a 400-year-old thatched roof cottage of their childhood in Souther England.

== Other works ==
In 2019, Flynn adapted a stage musical called Zog with its director, Mike Shepherd. The musical is based on the children's book Zog by Julia Donaldson and Axel Scheffler. Flynn composed the music and lyrics. It was toured in the UK and produced by Freckle Productions and Rose Theatre Kingston.

In January 2020, Magnitsky the Musical was released by BBC Radio 3. It was written by Flynn and Robert Hudson. Flynn also performed the lead role and composed the music.

Flynn is the co-author of the children's book The World to Come, written with Robert Macfarlane. It was published in the UK on 3 October 2024. The book is based on and inspired by the song of the same name, featured on their 2021 album, Lost in the Cedar Wood. It is illustrated by Emily Sutton.

Flynn has narrated a number of books:

- Macfarlane, R., & Morris, J. (2020). The Lost Spells. Anansi Audio.
- Gibson, J. (2021). The Octopus Man. Weidenfeld & Nicolson.
- Woolf, V. (2021). The Virginia Woolf Collection: The Waves. Audible Audio.
- Palmer, B. (2022). Isaac and the Egg. Headline Publishing Group.
- Page, S. (2022). Mrs. Wickham. Audible Audio.
- Fleming, I. (2024). For Your Eyes Only. HarperAudio.
- Kafka, F. Hofmann, M (translator). (2025). Metamorphosis and Other Stories. Penguin.
- Maurier, D. (2025). The Scapegoat. W.F. Howes Ltd.

== Recognition and awards ==
In 2005, Flynn was one of Screen International's Stars of Tomorrow.

Flynn was longlisted in the Evening Standard Awards and the What's On Stage Awards for best Newcomer for his role in The Heretic in 2012. He was nominated for an Olivier Award for Best Performance in a Supporting Role, for his role in Jerusalem the same year. He won a commendation in the 2012 Ian Charleson Awards for his role as Viola in Twelfth Night at the Globe Theatre.

In 2018 he won a Theatre World Award for his performance in the Off-Broadway production of Hangmen at the Atlantic Theatre, New York. His radio play Magnitsky the Musical won Best Original Single Drama at the BBC Audio Awards in 2021.

== Personal life ==
In 2011, Flynn married theatre designer Beatrice Minns, whom he had dated on and off since secondary school. They have three children together and live in East London.

== Discography ==
=== Singles and EPs ===
- Sweet William EP (2009)
- Home & Dry (For the Fishing Industry Safety Group) (2021)
- Coins for the Eyes (with Robert Macfarlane) (2022)
- Six Signs: Six Songs (with Robert Macfarlane, Hélöise Tunstall-Behrens, and Luisa Gerstein) (2022)

=== Soundtracks ===
- A Bag of Hammers (2011)
- Detectorists (2014)
- Song One (2014)
- Emma (2020)
- The Score (2021)
- The Mysterious Affair at Styles (2024)

=== Albums ===
- A Larum (2008)
- Been Listening (2010)
- Country Mile (2013)
- Live in Washington DC (2014)
- Sillion (2017)
- Live at the Roundhouse (as Johnny Flynn and the Sussex Wit) (2018)
- Lost in the Cedar Wood (with Robert Macfarlane) (2021)
- The Moon Also Rises (with Robert Macfarlane) (2023)
- Beam Cottage (with Lillie Flynn) (2026)

== Filmography ==
=== Film ===
Year	Title	Role	Notes	Ref.
2006	Crusade in Jeans	Dolf Vega		
2011	Lotus Eaters	Charlie		
2012	Something in the Air	N/A		
2014	Song One	James Forrester	Also, sang and played guitar	
2015	Clouds of Sils Maria	Christopher Giles		
2015	A Smallholding	Tonkey		
2016	Love Is Thicker Than Water	Arthur	Also music supervisor	
2017	Contractor 014352	Guy Bricklin	Short film	
2017	Beast	Pascal Renouf		
2019	Cordelia	Frank		
2020	Emma	George Knightley		
2020	Stardust	David Bowie		
2021	The Dig	Rory Lomax		
2021	The Score	Mike	Also executive producer	
2021	Operation Mincemeat	Ian Fleming		
2022	The Outfit	Francis		
2022	Scrooge: A Christmas Carol	Bob Cratchit	Voice	
2023	One Life	Nicholas Winton		
2025	& Sons	Richard Dyer		
2025	Goodbye June	Connor Cheshire		
2025	A Death in the Family	Noah	Short film	
2026	A Prayer for the Dying	Jacob Hansen		
2026	Elsinore	Richard Eyre		
2026	The Idiot(s) †	Fydor Dostoyevsky	Completed	
TBA	Codes †	Jasper Slater	Short film; completed	
TBA	The Road Home †	Paul Simon	Filming	

=== Television ===
Year	Title	Role	Notes	Ref.
2005	Murder in Suburbia	Josh Egan	Episode: "Witches"	
2006	Holby City	Karl Massingham	Episode: "Flight of the Bumblebee"	
2008	Kingdom	David Matthews	Episode: #2.5	
2014–2018	Lovesick	Dylan Witter	22 episodes	
2014	Detectorists	Johnny Piper	Episode: #1.3	
2015	Brotherhood	Toby	8 episodes	
2016	The Nightmare Worlds of H. G. Wells	Alec Harringay	Episode: "The Devotee of Art"	
2017	Inside No. 9	Elliot Quinn	Episode: "Private View"	
2017	Genius	Young Albert Einstein	8 episodes Nominated—Critics' Choice Television Award for Best Supporting Actor in a Movie/Miniseries	
2018	Vanity Fair	William Dobbin	7 episodes	
2018	Genius	Alain Cuny	Episode: "Picasso: Chapter Two"	
2018	Les Misérables	Felix Tholomyès	Episode: "#1.1"	
2023	The Lovers	Seamus	6 episodes	
2024	Ripley	Dickie Greenleaf	8 episodes	
2026	MobLand	Frankie Cooper	Main cast	
2026–present	Harry Potter	Lucius Malfoy	Upcoming HBO production	
