= The Moon Also Rises =

Studio album by Johnny Flynn
- Released: 10 November 2023
- Genre: Folk
- Length: 40:20
- Language: English
- Label: Transgressive
- Producer: Charlie Andrew

Johnny Flynn chronology
Lost in the Cedar Wood (2021)	The Moon Also Rises (2023)

The Moon Also Rises is the sixth (Note: Not including a live album and film soundtrack.) studio album by British singer-songwriter Johnny Flynn, released on 10 November 2023 through Transgressive Records. The album is the second time Flynn and nature writer Robert Macfarlane have collaborated.

== Background ==
After finishing their first album together, Lost in the Cedar Wood, Flynn and Macfarlane continued to write the songs that would eventually become The Moon Also Rises. According to Flynn, after completing the album they realized that the tracks roughly fall into two categories, "songs of burial and going into the earth, and then songs of rebirth", and that the track listing is organized accordingly. Parts of the album were recorded in an old Methodist chapel, which was the home of musician and friend Cosmo Sheldrake and his wife.

The tracks "Uncanny Valley" and "No Matter the Weight" were released as singles prior to the album.

== Reception ==
The Guardian gave the album 4/5, saying "By turns celebratory and thought-provoking, The Moon Also Rises is a joy."

== Track listing ==
All tracks are written by Johnny Flynn and Robert Macfarlane.

No.	Title	Length
1.	"Uncanny Valley"	03:10
2.	"Song With No Name"	03:44
3.	"Burial Blessing"	03:52
4.	"No Matter the Weight"	03:33
5.	"Coins for the Eyes"	04:23
6.	"The Sun Also Rises"	04:00
7.	"The Wild Hunt"	04:03
8.	"Through the Misty With You" (Solo written by Flynn)	03:17
9.	"Year-Long Winter"	04:56
10.	"River, Mountain and Love"	05:22
Total length:		40:20

== Personnel ==
- Charlie Andrew – production, mixing
- Cosmo Sheldrake – assistant
- Matthew Glasbey – Engineer
- Matt Ingram – Engineer
- Gabriel Langlands – cover art
- Matt Barker – design
