= Antimatter Blues =

2023 science fiction novel by Edward Ashton

- Author: Edward Ashton
- Language: English
- Genre: Science fiction
- Publisher: St. Martin's Griffin
- Publication date: March 14, 2023
- Publication place: United States
- Media type: Print, e-book, Audiobook
- Pages: 304 pp. (hardcover)
- ISBN: 9781250275059 (Hardcover)
- Preceded by: Mickey7

Antimatter Blues: A Mickey7 Novel is a 2023 science fiction novel by Edward Ashton. Antimatter Blues is the sequel to Ashton's 2022 novel Mickey7, with the narrative picking up two years later.

== Premise ==
Space colonist Mickey Barnes, a.k.a. Mickey7, is a former "expendable" on the hostile colony world of Niflheim. A couple of years after the events of Mickey7, Mickey finds himself at odds with his superior over the fate of an antimatter bomb that he hid away to make peace between the local sentient creatures and the colony. Mickey's efforts to retrieve the bomb and use its antimatter to refuel the colony's power source take him along a narrow road between two warring factions of the planet's native inhabitants: the insectoid Creepers and initially spider-like Collective. Guided by the colony's security team and Speaker, the Creeper representative, Mickey learns what it means to live life without a backup.
