= Been Listening =

Studio album by Johnny Flynn
- Released: 7 June 2010
- Genre: Folk rock
- Length: 50:24
- Label: Transgressive
- Producer: Ryan Hadlock

Johnny Flynn chronology
Sweet William EP (2009)	Been Listening (2010)	A Film Score of a Bag of Hammers (soundtrack) (2012)

Professional ratings
Review scores
Source	Rating
Drowned in Sound	8/10
NME	5/10
PopMatters	8/10

Been Listening is the second full-length LP by London-based folk-rock band Johnny Flynn & The Sussex Wit. The album was recorded in both London and Seattle, and features collaborations with Laura Marling and Anna Calvi. The album was also released in a 2-disc special edition and on vinyl.

== Track listing ==
No.	Title	Length
1.	"Kentucky Pill"	3:52
2.	"Lost and Found"	3:41
3.	"Churlish May"	4:03
4.	"Been Listening"	5:16
5.	"Barnacled Warship"	5:12
6.	"Sweet William, Pt. 2"	5:01
7.	"The Water (featuring Vocals by Laura Marling)"	4:13
8.	"Howl"	4:45
9.	"Agnes"	3:41
10.	"Amazon Love"	5:39
11.	"The Prizefighter and the Heiress (featuring Anna Calvi on Lead Guitar)"	5:07

iTunes Bonus Track
No.	Title	Length
12.	"The Water (Alternate Version featuring Sofia Larsson)"	4:30

Special Edition Bonus Disc
No.	Title	Length
1.	"The Water (Alternate Version featuring Sofia Larsson)"	4:30
2.	"Been Listening (Demo)"	5:03
3.	"Lost and Found (Demo)"	3:27
4.	"Churlish May (Demo)"	4:07
5.	"Howl (Demo)"	3:46
6.	"The Prizefighter and the Heiress (Demo)"	4:59
