= Lost in the Cedar Wood =

Studio album by Johnny Flynn
- Released: 14 May 2021
- Genre: Folk
- Length: 41:35
- Label: Transgressive
- Producer: Charlie Andrew

Johnny Flynn chronology
Sillion (2017)	Lost in the Cedar Wood (2021)	The Moon Also Rises (2023)

Lost in the Cedar Wood is the fifth (Note: Not including a live album and film soundtrack.) studio album by British singer-songwriter Johnny Flynn, released on 14 May 2021 through Transgressive Records. The album is a collaboration between Flynn and British nature writer Robert Macfarlane.

== Background ==
Flynn and Macfarlane collaborated to make Lost in the Cedar Wood beginning in the first half of 2020, during the COVID-19 pandemic. In an interview, Flynn noted that much of the writing was done separately, with communication with Macfarlane via WhatsApp, due to COVID lockdown restrictions.

The album is loosely based on the Epic of Gilgamesh, aiming to compare the themes of the ancient work with the modern world in the context of the pandemic. The album was recorded in a solar-powered cottage in Hampshire, England.

The track "Home and Dry" was released as a single, entitled "Home & Dry (For the Fishing Industry Safety Group)" on July 7, 2020.

A music video animated and directed by Lynn Tomlinson was released for the track "Ten Degrees of Strange".

== Reception ==
The album has a score of 76 on the review aggregator Metacritic, signifying "generally favorable reviews". NME gave Lost in the Cedar Wood four out of five stars, comparing it with the "joyful sound of spotting sunshine in the darkest of times". Clash magazine gave the album a rating of 8/10, calling it a "barnburner". Timothy Monger, writing for AllMusic, rated the album 4/5, praising the collaboration between Flynn and Macfarlane.

== Track listing ==
All tracks are written by Johnny Flynn and Robert Macfarlane.

No.	Title	Length
1.	"Ten Degrees of Strange"	4:30
2.	"The World to Come"	3:56
3.	"Gods and Monsters"	3:36
4.	"Bonedigger"	3:28
5.	"I Can't Swim There"	4:31
6.	"Nether"	2:51
7.	"Flood in the Desert"	3:35
8.	"Tree Rings"	2:47
9.	"Enkidu Walked"	4:00
10.	"Home and Dry"	3:20
11.	"Ferryman"	4:57
Total length:		41:35

== Personnel ==
- Charlie Andrew – production, mixing
- Matthew Glasbey – mixing, engineering, additional production
- Guy Davie – mastering
- Cosmo Sheldrake – engineering
- Beatrice Minns – cover art
- Flora Wallace – back cover

== Charts ==
Chart performance for Lost in the Cedar Wood
Chart (2021)	Peak position
Scottish Albums (Official Charts)	13
UK Albums (Official Charts)	65
UK Americana Albums (Official Charts)	1
UK Folk Albums (Official Charts)	3
UK Independent Albums (Official Charts)	2
