= The Score (2021 film) =

2021 film directed by Malachi Smyth

- Theatrical release poster
- Directed by: Malachi Smyth
- Written by: Malachi Smyth
- Produced by: Matthew James Wilkinson; Ben Pullen
- Starring: Johnny Flynn; Will Poulter; Naomi Ackie; Lydia Wilson
- Cinematography: Darran Bragg
- Music by: Johnny Flynn
- Production companies: Quickfire; WestEnd Films; Trigger Films; Pont Neuf Productions; Stigma Films; Sentinel Entertainment
- Release date: 21 November 2021 (PÖFF)
- Country: United Kingdom
- Language: English

The Score is a 2021 British musical heist film written and directed by Malachi Smyth. It stars Johnny Flynn, Will Poulter, Naomi Ackie and Lydia Wilson.

== Cast ==
- Johnny Flynn as Mike
- Will Poulter as Troy
- Naomi Ackie as Gloria
- Lydia Wilson as Sal

== Production ==
In February 2020, it was announced Johnny Flynn, Will Poulter, Naomi Ackie and Antonia Thomas had joined the cast of the film, with Malachi Smyth directing from a screenplay he wrote. Production was set to begin on 17 March 2020, but was delayed due to the COVID-19 pandemic. Production began on 31 August 2020, and concluded on 2 October 2020, with Lydia Wilson replacing Thomas. Filming took place in and around the Luton Hoo estate in Hertfordshire.

== Soundtrack ==
The soundtrack features 23 tracks of music composed and performed by Johnny Flynn, with several tracks featuring performances by the other starting actors.

== Release ==
The film had its premiere on 21 November 2021, at the Tallinn Black Nights Film Festival.

== Reception ==
On review aggregator Rotten Tomatoes, 53% of 15 critics gave the film a positive review, with an average rating of 5.6/10, earning it a "Rotten" score. On Metacritic, the film holds a weighted average score of 51 out of 100, based on ten critics, indicating "mixed or average" reviews.
