= The 47th =

2022 play by Mike Bartlett

- Written by: Mike Bartlett
- Genre: Drama; Future history
- Setting: The United States in a then-future 2024, alternative universe

Premiere
- Date: 29 March 2022
- Place: The Old Vic, London

The 47th is a 2022 play in blank verse by Mike Bartlett that tells an imagined future history regarding who will become the 47th president of the United States, following Joe Biden, which ends up being Kamala Harris.

== Production history ==
The 47th ran at The Old Vic theatre, London, from 29 March to 28 May 2022.

=== Cast and characters ===
Character	London
Character	2022
Donald Trump	Bertie Carvel
Kamala Harris	Tamara Tunie
Ivanka Trump	Lydia Wilson
Shaman	Joss Carter
Charlie Takahashi	James Cooney
Ted Cruz/Paul	James Garnon
Steve Richetti/Ohio Senator	Richard Hansell
Donald Jr/Matt	Oscar Lloyd
Heidi Cruz/Moderator/CIA	Jenni Maitland
Eric Trump	Freddie Meredith
General Taylor	Ben Onwukwe
Tina Flournoy/Nurse Vita	Cherrelle Skeete
Rosie Takahashi	Ami Tredrea
Joe Biden	Simon Williams

== Plot ==
Ahead of the 2024 United States presidential election, Donald Trump picks his daughter, Ivanka, as his personal heir, and is introduced to her assistant and driver, Rosie Takahashi. Ted Cruz asks for Trump's endorsement in the Republican primaries, as Trump is no longer running for president. Later, at the funeral of Jimmy Carter, Joe Biden tells Kamala Harris that he is still uncertain over whether to run for election as the Democratic nominee. Trump crashes the funeral and, in secret, reveals to Biden that he knows compromising information about Jill Biden. Ivanka chastises her father for such a display, and is shown to be weary of her father's underestimation of her, which she plans to use for her own gain. Cruz invites Trump to a rally to announce Trump's endorsement of him, but caught up in the crowd's cheers, Trump turns on Cruz and promptly announces that he will be running for president again. Backstage, Rosie encounters her brother, political reporter Charlie Takahashi, and both spar over their differing political views, with Charlie being a liberal Democrat and Rosie a Trump-supporting Republican. Ivanka confirms Trump's announcement to a crowd of skeptical congressmen, and reveals that she will run as his vice president.

Later, a day before the first presidential debate, Harris encounters a restless and paranoid Biden late at night, who is revealed to have been in that state since the encounter with Trump at Carter's funeral. Biden is fearful about the threat posed by Trump, but reveals he is no longer in the position to run for president and begs Harris to take his place, and resigns as president on the spot. Harris is promptly sworn in as president and Democratic nominee. A day later, while waiting to attend the debate with Rosie at a Michigan bar filled with Trump supporters, Charlie questions one about an apparent plan to attack an event and reveals his status as a reporter; he is promptly escorted away by them, leaving Rosie to search for him. The debate between Harris and Trump is then interrupted by the Trump supporters storming the venue, as Trump ends the debate and disappears into the crowd. Harris is evacuated as the street descends into chaos and violence.

In the Situation Room, Harris observes the mob violence and is persuaded by her staff to arrest Trump to end the chaos and prevent further fatalities. Trump is arrested and imprisoned as Ivanka seizes control of his assets. Harris visits the incarcerated Trump and they exchange words, with her ultimately deciding to free Trump out of fear that keeping him in prison will only make him a martyr. While celebrating her father's freedom alongside him, Ivanka is misogynistically chastised by Donald, leaving her to formulate a plan of revenge. Harris is told by her staff that newly-emboldened Trump supporters have now enforced mob rule on the streets, despite the National Guard's best efforts. Charlie, now blinded from his torture at the hands of the mob, is brought before Harris by an aide, as her staff persuades her to orchestrate Trump's death to end the violence, to which she refuses. As Harris leaves, the aide who brought Charlie in is then revealed to be Rosie.

A week before the election, Trump leaves for a motorcade across D.C. with Rosie as his driver, as Ivanka sees him off. Shortly afterwards, a severely injured Trump is admitted to the hospital; Harris arrives to meet with him, and it is revealed that Rosie had crashed the car with her and Trump at the cost of her own life. Angered with Harris and with no health insurance due to Ivanka's efforts, Trump tears off his IV tubes to get the nurse's attention, but promptly collapses and dies. Ivanka arrives and discusses her father with Harris, and reveals how both of them have been alleged to be behind Donald's fate. Ivanka then reveals her anticipation for the upcoming election, for which she is now the Republican nominee, as Harris realizes the extent of Ivanka's machinations and displays anxiety over the future.

== Critical reception ==
Arifa Akbar in The Guardian described Bertie Carvel as "devilishly good", but felt "this Trumpian satire feels too soon". Andrzej Lukowski for TimeOut describes the play as "tremendous entertainment, that explores the decline of American democracy in an infinitely more enjoyable way than the actual decline of American democracy we must all bear witness to". Writing for the Evening Standard, Nick Curtis states that "the language and staging of The 47th is eloquent and clever, but it has surprisingly little to say about a monster so huge."
