= A Prayer for the Dying (2026 film) =

Norwegian drama film

- Theatrical release poster
- Directed by: Dara Van Dusen
- Screenplay by: Dara Van Dusen
- Based on: A Prayer for the Dying by Stewart O'Nan
- Produced by: Dyveke Bjørkly Graver; Andrea Berentsen Ottmar
- Starring: Johnny Flynn; John C. Reilly
- Cinematography: Kate McCullough
- Edited by: Fredrik Morheden
- Music by: Beata Hlavenková
- Production company: Eye Eye Pictures
- Release date: 13 February 2026 (Berlinale)
- Running time: 95 minutes
- Countries: Norway; Greece; United Kingdom; Sweden
- Language: English

A Prayer for the Dying is a 2026 drama film written and directed by Dara Van Dusen, and adapted from the novel of the same name by Stewart O'Nan. It stars Johnny Flynn and John C. Reilly.

The film had its world premiere at the Perspectives section of the 76th Berlin International Film Festival on 13 February 2026, where it was nominated for the Best First Feature Award.

== Premise ==
Decisions of life and death are taken in the Scandinavian emigrant community in the 1870s town of Friendship, Wisconsin.

== Cast ==
- Johnny Flynn as Jacob Hansen
- John C. Reilly as Doc
- Kristine Kujath Thorp as Marta
- Gustav Lindh as Harlow
- Chris Slater

== Production ==
The film is written and directed by Dara Van Dusen, based on the novel by Stewart O'Nan. It is produced by Dyveke Bjørkly Graver and Andrea Berentsen Ottmar for Eye Eye Pictures.

The cast is led by Johnny Flynn, John C. Reilly, Kristine Kujath Thorp and Gustav Lindh. Principal photography took place in Bratislava, Slovakia in August 2024. First look images from filming were released in September 2024.

== Release ==
The film premiered at the 76th Berlin International Film Festival. Following the premiere, Quiver Distribution purchased distribution rights for North America.
