= The Heretic (Bean play) =

2011 play by Richard Bean

- Original language: English
- Written by: Richard Bean
- Characters: 3 male, 3 female

Premiere
- Date: 2011; Royal Court Theatre in London
- Place: Britain

The Heretic is a British black comedy play by Richard Bean about climate change and its sceptics. In 2011 it premiered at the Royal Court Theatre receiving positive reviews directed by Jeremy Herrin starring Juliet Stevenson, James Fleet, Lydia Wilson and Johnny Flynn. It made its Australian debut in 2012 at the Melbourne Theatre Company in a production directed by Matt Scholten and starring Noni Hazlehurst, Andrew McFarlane, Anna Samson, Shaun Goss, Lyall Brooks and Katy Warner. The play was published in 2011, and was included in a collection of Bean's plays published in 2013.

== Synopsis ==
University lecturer Dr Diane Cassell's boss and one time lover Professor Kevin Maloney is trying to suppress her recent research into sea levels, as its results contradict the university's mainstream science stand upon global warming. Kevin, hoping to win a lucrative and high-profile research project for the university, pressurises Diane to tone down her controversial lectures, during which she tries to teach the students to reanalyse accepted views over climate change. He also attempts to make her withhold her research findings until the research project decision has been made. Kevin refuses to take the violent threats that Diane has been receiving from Green activists seriously.

Cassell's daughter Phoebe, an erratic anorexic, is there when her mother meets her new student, Ben Shotter, a fervent environmentalist, and the two are immediately attracted to one another. Even though Ben disagrees with Diane's politics he returns to her one on one tutorials in the hope of meeting Phoebe once more. In their lessons Diane teaches him to view science objectively, and not about manipulation of scientific fact. Ben begins to enjoy his lessons and Diane sees potential in him, despite his sometimes irrational and overly emotional outbursts about his estranged family, and his history of self-abuse - to Diane's horror he holds a knife to his wrist during one of their tutorials. He calms down when she agrees to let Ben visit her and her daughter during the Christmas break.

Meanwhile, the death threats against Diane become worse. Geoff Tordoff, who provides site services for the campus, including security, is of only limited help, seemingly more concerned with turning off Diane's lights than with the threats.

Kevin discovers that Diane has published her research regardless of his pressure, and he summons her to a disciplinary hearing, which she refuses to take seriously: using a small soft toy polar bear as her 'union representative'. She is suspended from the university.

Over Christmas Diane and Phoebe go down to their countryside home. Geoff breaks into their home while they are out and hides himself in a bedroom upstairs. A depressed Kevin turns up at their home having been thrown out by his wife, and having lost the research project to another university. Kevin apologises to Diane for his behaviour, and their old romantic history is stirred up again. Ben arrives and he and Phoebe are getting on well until he becomes distracted by Kevin and Diane, who are looking into the opposing university's research, having hacked into their website. They discover that the University has manipulated their research results to support their own climate change standpoint.

Ben plays Phoebe a song he wrote for her, and enthralled she takes him to the barn, where they smoke cannabis. They supply some to Kevin who regrets the end of his relationship to Diane.

Phoebe announces to her mother that she is going to move in with Ben. Diane panics, worried that Ben will not be able to cope with Phoebe's anorexia, or that she might become pregnant. She says that Phoebe has threatened to kill herself if she becomes pregnant, rather than bringing another person into the world. In a blazing row with her mother Phoebe starts to have chest pains, before collapsing with a heart attack. Hearing the family's distress Geoff runs downstairs and administers first aid to Phoebe, admitting to Diane that he and his environmentalist group were the ones sending the threatening messages. They had intended to kidnap her that night.

Eight months later, Diane and Kevin are about to attend Phoebe's marriage to Ben. Phoebe is heavily and happily pregnant. Kevin gives Diane a 'peer review' of her speech, about which she is nervous, and which is a eulogy of mankind's place in the universe. They leave for the wedding.

== Productions ==
| Character | Original Cast, 2011 | Original Australian Cast, 2012 |
|---|---|---|
| Director | Jeremy Herrin | Matt Scholten |
| Dr Diane Cassell | Juliet Stevenson | Noni Hazlehurst |
| Professor Kevin Maloney | James Fleet | Andrew McFarlane |
| Phoebe Cassell | Lydia Wilson | Anna Samson |
| Ben Shotter | Johnny Flynn | Shaun Goss |
| Geoff Tordoff | Adrian Hood | Lyall Brooks |
| Catherine Tickell | Leah Whitaker | Katy Warner |

The Heretic received its premiere at the Royal Court Theatre in London in 2011, in a production directed by Jeremy Herrin. It garnered generally positive reviews especially as it was compared to the critically panned National Theatre's Greenland and the also well received Water at the Tricycle Theatre both about global warming. It was praised for its unapologetic non conformist stance, Charles Spencer of The Telegraph called it "an absolute corker, funny, provocative and touching, and absolutely resolute in its refusal to lapse into the apocalyptic gloom that usually attends this subject."

In 2013, The Heretic made its US debut under the direction of Jerome Davis at Burning Coal Theatre in Raleigh, North Carolina.
