= Mickey7 =

2022 science fiction novel by Edward Ashton

- Author: Edward Ashton
- Language: English
- Genre: Science fiction
- Publisher: St Martin's Griffin
- Publication date: February 15, 2022
- Publication place: United States
- Media type: Print, e-book, Audiobook
- Pages: 369 pp. (hardcover)
- ISBN: 9783641280543 (Hardcover)
- Followed by: Antimatter Blues

Mickey7 is a 2022 science fiction novel by Edward Ashton. Its sequel, Antimatter Blues, was released in March 2023.

Mickey 17, a film adaptation directed by Bong Joon-ho, was released in 2025.

== Premise ==
Space colonist Mickey Barnes, a.k.a. Mickey7, tries to survive in a beachhead colony on an alien world. The job he reluctantly signed up for is to be "expendable", undertaking all of the most dangerous tasks necessary for a mission to colonize the ice world Niflheim. When one Mickey dies, another is cloned in his place with most of his memories intact, but at a significant cost to the colony. Mickey's survival difficulties mount as the colony struggles for resources, native life forms become increasingly threatening, and circumstances result in the accidental creation of two Mickeys.

== Creation ==
Ashton started writing the book in 2015. Ashton wanted to explore the teletransportation paradox in a shorter novella but was urged to write more by Navah Wolfe.

Discussing the background of the novel, Ashton said: "I wrote a short story a number of years ago that explored...a sort of crappy immortality.... I liked the idea and wanted to see how that could be expanded if you coupled it with an exploitative social structure."

In addition, George R. R. Martin's "Thousand Worlds" universe (setting for Martin's debut novel, Dying of the Light, Sandkings, Nightflyers, A Song for Lya, "The Way of Cross and Dragon", and the stories collected in Tuf Voyaging, among others) was also a major influence.

== Reception ==
NPR included it among its list of the Best Sci-Fi Books of 2022.

Writing for Locus, Gabino Iglesias called the book a "multilayered, wildly entertaining story" and wrote, "Mickey7 has something for everyone while also putting a fresh spin on the idea of clones."

Writing for Transfer Orbit, Andrew Liptak praised it as a "fun sci-fi romp, part Andy Weir's The Martian and John Scalzi's Old Man's War and Sue Burke's Semiosis."

Writing for New Scientist, Sally Adee wrote, "Is (uploaded consciousness) a goal that’s worth pursuing, even in theory? Edward Ashton’s Mickey7 is the first novel I have come across that properly explores the philosophy behind that question."

It was nominated as one of the Best Science Fiction books of 2022 by Goodreads.

== Sequel ==
A sequel, Antimatter Blues, written as a result of a film adaptation of the original novel entering production, was released in March 2025.

== Film adaptation ==
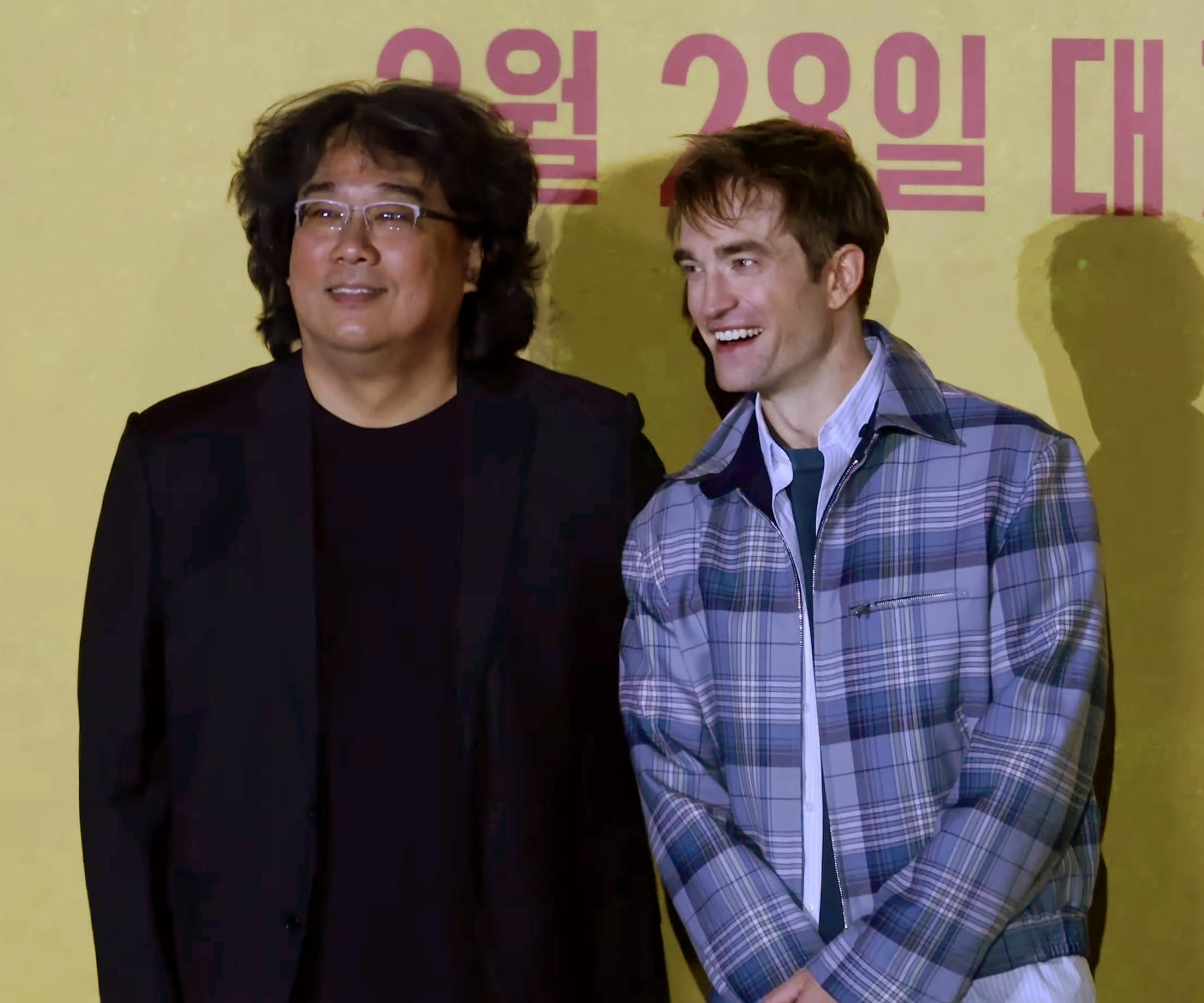
Bong Joon-ho and Robert Pattinson in South Korea for Mickey 17 in 2025

The book was adapted into a film directed and written by Bong Joon-ho and starring Robert Pattinson as Mickey, Steven Yeun, Toni Collette, Naomi Ackie and Mark Ruffalo. When asked about the adaptation, Ashton responded that Bong is "going to change a lot about the book", but said he is not nervous and described Bong as a "genius". Filming began in August 2022 and wrapped in December. The film was scheduled to be released theatrically on March 29, 2024, but had been pushed back due to delays related to the 2023 SAG-AFTRA strike.

Mickey 17 premiered at the 75th Berlin International Film Festival on February 15, 2025, before being theatrically released by Warner Bros. Pictures in South Korea on February 28, 2025, and later in the United States on March 7.
