= Lydia Wilson =

British-American actress (born 1984)

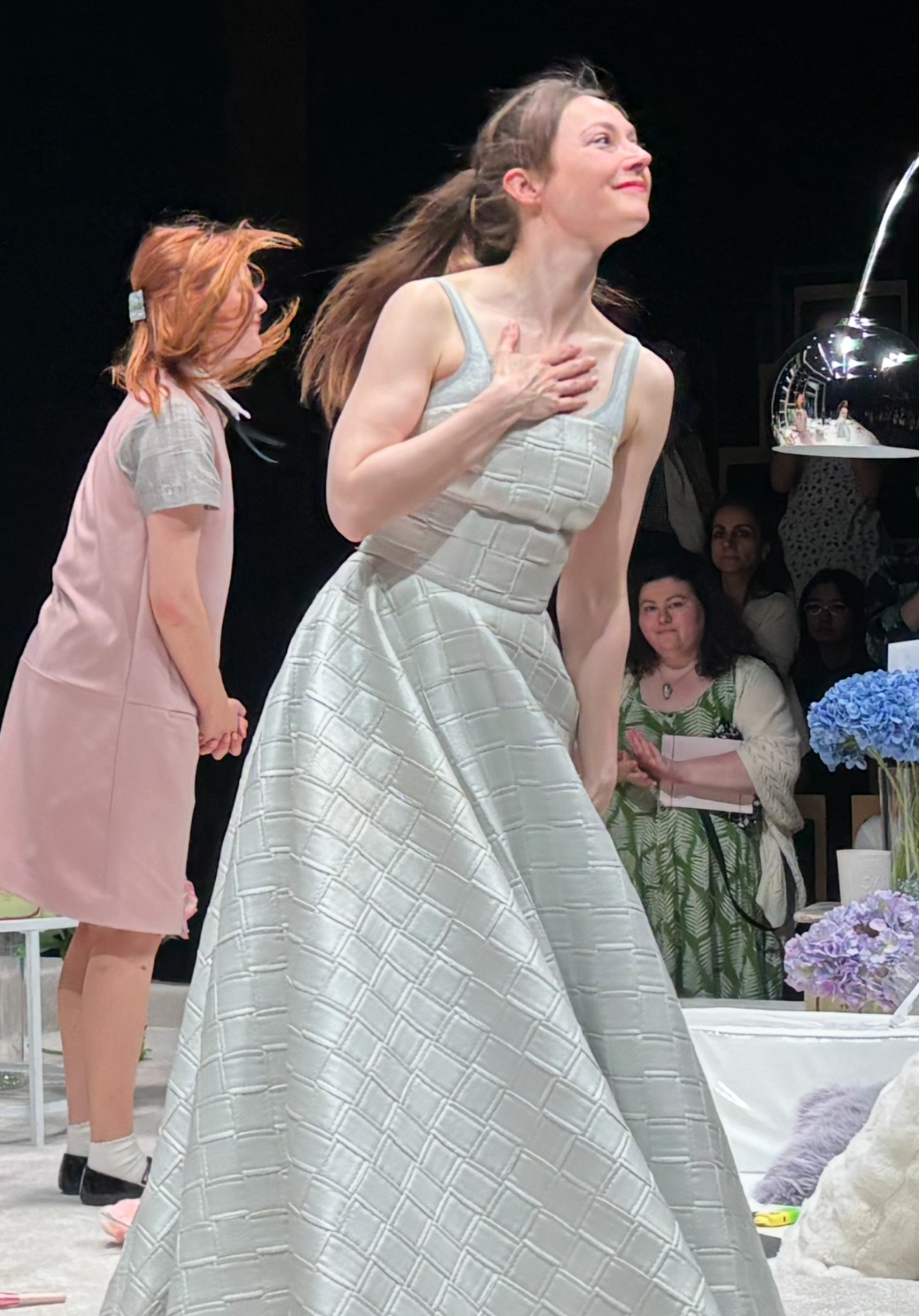
- Wilson in 2026
- Born: 30 November 1984 (age 41); Queen's Park, Kilburn, London, England
- Education: Queens' College, Cambridge; Royal Academy of Dramatic Art
- Occupations: Actor, radio personality
- Years active: 2009–present

Lydia Wilson (born 30 November 1984) is an English-American actress. Since graduating in 2009 from the Royal Academy of Dramatic Art, she has performed in numerous television and theatre productions including the Olivier Award-winning Blasted by Sarah Kane in 2010 at the Lyric Theatre, and as Kate Middleton in the Olivier Award winning King Charles III at the Almeida Theatre, Wyndham's Theatre and Music Box Theatre on Broadway.

== Early life ==
Wilson was born to an American mother and an English father, and was brought up in Queen's Park, Kilburn, London. She has said that her acting ambitions came from her grandparents, who were stage actors from New York. She attended Henrietta Barnett School, a state Grammar school in Hampstead Garden Suburb. After completing a foundation course at the Chelsea College of Art and Design, she graduated with an English degree from Queens' College, Cambridge, then trained at the Royal Academy of Dramatic Art (RADA), graduating with a degree in Acting in 2009.

== Career ==
Wilson made her film debut in the alternative history romance drama Never Let Me Go (2010). In 2014, she was included in the London Evening Standard list of the 1,000 most influential Londoners.

== Filmography ==
=== Film ===
| Year | Title | Role | Notes |
|---|---|---|---|
| 2010 | Never Let Me Go | Hannah | |
| 2012 | The Tightrope | Herself | Documentary short film |
| 2013 | About Time | Catherine "Kit-Kat" Lake | |
| 2013 | Columbite Tantalite | Anna | Short film |
| 2013 | Hereafter | Katcher | Short film |
| 2016 | Star Trek Beyond | Jessica Wolff / Kalara | |
| 2016 | Love Is Thicker Than Water | Vida | |
| 2018 | Still | Ella | |
| 2018 | Dead Birds | Saskia Jensen | Short film |
| 2018 | All Is True | Susanna Shakespeare | |
| 2018 | The Plunge | Emily | Short film |
| 2020 | Ganef | Mrs. Hirth | Short film |
| 2021 | The Score | Sal | |

=== Television ===
| Year | Title | Role | Notes |
|---|---|---|---|
| 2010 | Pete Versus Life | Rachel | Episode: "Fankoo" |
| 2010 | Midsomer Murders | Zoe Stock | Episode: "Master Class" |
| 2010 | Any Human Heart | Monday | Episode: "1.3" |
| 2011 | South Riding | Muriel Carne | Recurring role |
| 2011 | The Crimson Petal and the White | Elizabeth | Episode #1.1 |
| 2011 | Black Mirror | Princess Susannah | Episode: "The National Anthem" |
| 2012 | Dirk Gently | Jane | Episode #1.2 |
| 2012 | The Making of a Lady | Emily Fox Seton | Television film |
| 2013 | Misfits | Laura | 2 episodes |
| 2014–2016 | Ripper Street | Mimi Morton | 12 episodes |
| 2018 | Requiem | Matilda | 6 episodes |
| 2019–2020 | Flack | Eve | 12 episodes |
| 2023 | The Swarm | Sara Thompson | 8 episodes |
| 2025 | Nine Bodies in a Mexican Morgue | Sonja Blair | Main role |
| 2026 | Silent Witness | DI Ashley Moss | |
| 2026 | Alice and Steve | Marni | |

=== Theatre ===
- House of Special Purpose (2009) as Maria
- Pains of Youth (2009) as Desiree
- Blasted (2010) as Cate
- The Heretic (2011)
- The Acid Test (2011) as Jessica
- 'Tis Pity She's a Whore (2011) as Annabella
- Hysteria (2013) as Jessica
- King Charles III (2014) as Kate, Duchess of Cambridge Olivier Award Nomination for Best Supporting Actress
- The Duchess of Malfi (2020) as The Duchess
- Walden (2021) as Cassie
- The 47th (2022) as Ivanka Trump
- The Maids (2025–2026) as Claire

=== Radio ===
- A Tale of Two Cities (2011) as Lucie Manette
- An American Rose (2012) as Kathleen Kennedy
- The Bell Jar (2013) as narrator
- The Exorcist (2014) as Regan MacNeil
- The Letters of Sylvia Plath as Sylvia Plath
- Black Water, An American Story (2019) as Kelly, Nominated for Best Actress, BBC Audio Awards
- Klara and the Sun (2021) as Narrator
- Mansfield Park (2022) as Fanny Price
- Happy Birthday, Mr President (2023) as Marilyn Monroe, Nominated for Best Actress, BBC Audio Awards
- Small Boat by Vincent Delecroix (2025) as narrator
