= A Film Score of a Bag of Hammers =

A Film Score of A Bag of Hammers

Soundtrack album by Johnny Flynn & The Sussex Wit
- Released: 21 April 2012
- Genre: Folk
- Length: 27:56
- Label: Transgressive

Johnny Flynn & The Sussex Wit chronology
Been Listening (2010)	A Film Score of A Bag of Hammers (2012)	Country Mile (2013)

A Film Score of A Bag of Hammers is the third full-length album by Johnny Flynn & The Sussex Wit, written as the soundtrack to Brian Crano's 2011 film A Bag of Hammers. It was released on limited vinyl on 21 April 2012, as part of Record Store Day and on digital on 10 December.

== Track listing ==
=== Side A ===
No.	Title	Length
1.	"I Don't Wanna Go"	2:26
2.	"Flowers in My Garden"	3:32
3.	"Bikes (Instrumental)"	1:30
4.	"Suicide (Instrumental)"	1:57
5.	"I Am Light"	3:00

=== Side B ===
No.	Title	Length
6.	"Can I Stay? (Instrumental)"	0:59
7.	"Linden Lea"	3:32
8.	"Momma's Gotta Have a Life (Instrumental)"	2:24
9.	"I Don't Know the Sun"	4:43
10.	"Where My Father Went"	4:07
