= Sillion =

Studio album by Johnny Flynn
- Released: 24 March 2017
- Genre: Folk
- Length: 44:56
- Language: English
- Label: Transgressive

Johnny Flynn chronology
Country Mile (2013)	Sillion (2017)	Lost in the Cedar Wood (2021)

Sillion is the fourth (Note: Not including a live album and film soundtrack.) studio album by British singer-songwriter Johnny Flynn, released in 2017 through Transgressive Records. The album reached no. 96 in the UK.

== Background ==
Sillion was Flynn's first studio album since 2013's Country Mile. In the interim, Flynn was increasingly active as an actor. The record was recorded at Soup Studio in London.

Flynn has said that the album was influenced strongly by this personal life:

My Dad died when I was 18, and that was quite a galvanising experience,' he says, 'and there's often an element of that in anything I’m writing; every big loss that you suffer in life, I think everything comes through the conduit of that. And I had a really strong sense of my daughter having elements of my Dad when she came along, and it made me kind of laugh – that cyclical sense, of thinking of my daughter as my Dad.

The track "Heart Sunk Hank", which explores Flynn's relationship with his wife, was inspired by the folk song "Fare Thee Well". The song was also partially recorded on a 1940s Voice-o-Graph, giving it a unique sound and making it the "record's highlight" per Rhian Daly of DIY.

Flynn released music videos for the tracks "In the Deepest", "Wandering Aengus", and "Raising the Dead", all directed by Simon Ryninks.

== Reception ==
Sillion reached no. 96 in the UK, Flynn's third album to chart in the top 100. The record has a score of 74 on the review aggregator Metacritic, signifying "generally favorable" reviews. Timothy Monger of AllMusic indicated that the opening three tracks of the album "stand among the best of [Flynn's] career". Sarah Dawood of The Line of Best Fit praised the album, calling it "an emotionally challenging piece that engages and encapsulates its listeners" and a "piece of art."

In a more negative review, Harry Harris of The Skinny opined that the record felt like a "side-project" to Flynn's acting career, while still finding that it was a "perfectly fine" record.

== Track listing ==
All tracks are written by Johnny Flynn

No.	Title	Length
1.	"Raising the Dead"	3:33
2.	"Wandering Aengus"	3:47
3.	"Heart Sunk Hank"	3:11
4.	"Barleycorn"	4:32
5.	"The Night My Piano Upped and Died"	3:55
6.	"In the Deepest"	3:11
7.	"In Your Pockets"	3:16
8.	"Jefferson's Torch"	4:23
9.	"Tarp in the Prop"	3:55
10.	"The Landlord"	6:34
11.	"Hard Road"	4:39
Total length:		44:56
