= A Larum =

Studio album by Johnny Flynn
- Released: 26 May 2008 (UK); 29 July 2008 (US)
- Genre: Folk rock
- Length: 53:39
- Labels: Vertigo (UK); Lost Highway Records (US)

Johnny Flynn chronology
A Larum (2008)	Sweet William EP (2009)

A Larum is the debut album of London-based folk rock musician Johnny Flynn, released in the UK on 26 May 2008 and in the US on 29 July 2008. On the album, Flynn is backed by his band the Sussex Wit.

== Background ==
The title of the album is the Middle English word for "alarm," used in Shakespeare's stage directions to signify a disturbance occurring offstage, and Flynn "quite liked the idea that the noise happening offstage was this album".

The record was recorded at a studio called Bear Creek near Seattle. In a 2010 interview, Flynn said of the studio, "The only thing around was a coffee stand where the girls wore bikinis. It was on a main road through the woods, in the middle of nowhere. That made us feel very English."

== Reception ==
Professional ratings
Review scores
Source	Rating
Allmusic	4/5 stars
Drowned in Sound	(8/10) link
The Independent	(favourable) link
musicOMH.com	4.5/5 stars
This Is Fake DIY	dead link
The Times	dead link

In her review for Allmusic, critic Katherine Fullton wrote "it quickly becomes clear that the Wit's intricate, meandering rhythms and melodies are a fitting complement to Flynn's straightforward delivery, augmenting lyrics that would also function as poetry outside of a musical setting... The tangible intimacy between Flynn and his group makes A Larum not only an introduction, but also captures the gentle, amicable nature that makes them such an inviting and satisfying listen."

Peter Hayward of MusicOMH called the album "a marvellously accomplished and endearing debut that, while rooted in tradition and most easily described as folk, should have broader appeal beyond the beardy-weirdy set."

Writing for Rolling Stone, David Fricke named A Larum as one of "Fricke's Picks", calling it a "dramatic entrance" for Flynn and his band, drawing allusions between Flynn and earlier folk artists such as Fairport Convention and Bert Jansch.

The song "Tickle Me Pink" was featured as iTunes free single of the week. A Larum was nominated for the Xfm New Music Award (2009) and was also named as the 37th best album of 2008 by Paste Magazine.

Flynn re-issued A Larum in October 2019.

== Track listing ==
No.	Title	Length
1.	"The Box"	3:36
2.	"The Wrote & The Writ"	4:07
3.	"Tickle Me Pink"	3:11
4.	"Brown Trout Blues"	5:02
5.	"Eyeless in Holloway"	4:05
6.	"Shore to Shore"	4:23
7.	"Cold Bread"	3:29
8.	"Wayne Rooney"	4:18
9.	"Leftovers"	4:16
10.	"Sally"	3:35
11.	"Hong Kong Cemetery"	4:51
12.	"Tunnels"	3:08
13.	"All the Dogs are Lying Down"	4:13
14.	"Shore to Shore (Reprise)"	1:27

Vinyl/iTunes Bonus Tracks
No.	Title	Length
15.	"The Ghost of O'Donahue"	4:57
16.	"Old Tricks"	3:51
