= Mickey 17 =

2025 film by Bong Joon Ho

- Theatrical release poster
- Directed by: Bong Joon Ho
- Written by: Bong Joon Ho
- Based on: Mickey7 by Edward Ashton
- Produced by: Dede Gardner; Jeremy Kleiner; Bong Joon Ho; Dooho Choi
- Starring: Robert Pattinson; Naomi Ackie; Steven Yeun; Toni Collette; Mark Ruffalo
- Cinematography: Darius Khondji
- Edited by: Yang Jin-mo
- Music by: Jung Jae-il
- Production companies: Warner Bros. Pictures; Plan B Entertainment; Offscreen; Kate Street Picture Company
- Distributed by: Warner Bros. Pictures
- Release dates: February 13, 2025 (Leicester Square); February 28, 2025 (South Korea); March 7, 2025 (United States)
- Running time: 137 minutes
- Countries: United States; South Korea
- Language: English
- Budget: $118 million
- Box office: $133.5 million

Mickey 17 is a 2025 science fiction black comedy film written, produced, and directed by Bong Joon Ho, based on the 2022 novel Mickey7 by Edward Ashton. The film stars Robert Pattinson in the title role, alongside Naomi Ackie, Steven Yeun, Patsy Ferran, Cameron Britton, Daniel Henshall, Stephen Park, Anamaria Vartolomei, Toni Collette, and Mark Ruffalo. Set in the year 2054, the plot follows a man who joins a space colony voyage as an "Expendable", a disposable worker who is cloned every time he dies.

Mickey 17 had its world premiere at Leicester Square in London on February 13, 2025, and was released theatrically by Warner Bros. Pictures in South Korea on February 28, and in the United States on March 7. The film received generally positive reviews from critics, but was a box office failure, unable to earn back its budget.

== Plot ==
In 2050, to escape the global reach of a murderous loan shark, Mickey Barnes and his friend Timo join a spaceship crew to colonize the ice planet Niflheim. Timo becomes a shuttle pilot, while Mickey joins as an "Expendable", a controversial job involving extremely dangerous tasks, with death resulting in a new clone of him with restored memories being created through a process called "reprinting". During the voyage, a romance develops between Mickey and security agent Nasha.

Four years later, the spaceship arrives at Niflheim. After experimenting on and sacrificing multiple iterations of Mickey, the ship's scientists develop a vaccine for the planet's viral pathogens. The seventeenth Mickey is sent to capture one of the native lifeforms dubbed "Creepers", (Note: Entertainment writer Ty Burr described the creepers as "a cross between a buffalo and a microscopic water bear.") but falls into a fissure. Timo retrieves Mickey's valuable flamethrower but, out of convenience, leaves Mickey to die. The Creepers swarm Mickey, but instead of eating him, they carry him to the surface.

Mickey returns to the ship and is surprised to find an aggressive Mickey 18 has been printed. The expedition's leader, politician Kenneth Marshall, has sworn that in the event of "Multiples" of clones, all clones will be eliminated. (Note: Flashbacks explain that the first case of multiples involved a psychopathic serial killer, causing a moral panic. During subsequent hearings, Preston stated that the soul is indivisible and so multiples are "soulless abominations", and Marshall echoes that multiples are "Satan's work".) As a result, Mickey 18 attempts to kill Mickey 17, but 17 suggests they secretly rotate duties and deaths to survive. The two are interrupted when they witness Timo selling flamethrower fuel as drugs. Furious at Timo's abuses, Mickey 18 tries to kill Timo, but relents when they are interrupted by Nasha. 18 leaves with Nasha, while 17 is taken to dinner with Marshall, his wife Ylfa, and security agent Kai. At the dinner, Mickey 17 reacts severely to being fed experimental vat-grown meat and painkillers. Kai saves Mickey 17 from being executed and brings him to her quarters, but Mickey 17 flees back to Nasha when Kai attempts to seduce him.

Nasha learns of the clones and accepts them, but Kai stumbles across the trio and tries to report them. When Mickey 17 informs 18 of the dinner incident, an enraged 18 decides to kill Marshall at a public ceremony unveiling a Niflheim rock to commemorate the expedition. Two baby Creepers, Luko and Zoco, emerge from the rock, causing panic. Mickey 17 captures Zoco, but Luko is killed by security when it startles Marshall. Nasha stops Mickey 18 from killing Marshall, but the Multiples are exposed, leading to the arrest of Nasha and both Mickeys.

Meanwhile, thousands of Creepers gather outside the ship, calling for Zoco. In the brig, Mickey 17's description of the Creepers helping him causes Nasha to realize they are sentient. Timo arrives to dismember Mickey 17 on orders from the loan shark, who has an agent on the expedition. Mickey 18 offers to take 17's place in a ruse, allowing Nasha to escape and overpower Timo, but security intervenes and takes them all to Marshall.

Marshall announces his plan to eliminate the Creepers and destroys Mickey's memory backups to prevent him from being reprinted. Ylfa convinces Marshall to take the Mickeys outside and compete to collect Creeper tails for culinary use, with the winner allowed to live. The Mickeys are fitted with remote-detonated bomb vests to ensure compliance.

Once outside, the Mickeys seek out the Creepers' leader. Marshall follows up with a security team to eliminate them and the Creepers when they fail to fulfill their task. Mickey 17 uses a translation device to warn the mother Creeper about Marshall's plan, and the mother demands Zoco's release and the sacrifice of a human in compensation for Luko's death. Mickey 17 signals to Nasha to free Zoco. She takes Ylfa hostage to ensure Zoco's release, and security agents, secretly working against Marshall, arrest Ylfa. Mickey 18 fights Marshall and detonates his vest, killing himself and Marshall to meet the Creepers' demands.

Afterwards, Mickey 17, called Mickey Barnes once again, and the rest of the expedition make peace with the Creepers. Nasha, now the colony leader, outlaws the Expendable program, and a ceremony is held to destroy the reprinting machine. During the ceremony, Mickey experiences a nightmare-like sequence in which Ylfa tries to reprint Marshall, but Mickey recalls that rumors circulated that Ylfa had committed suicide in a psych ward where she was put after going into shock following Marshall's death. Mickey snaps back to the present and blows up the cloning device.

== Cast ==
- Robert Pattinson as Mickey Barnes, Mickey 17 / Mickey 18, an "Expendable" employee on Niflheim on his seventeenth, later eighteenth, iteration
- Naomi Ackie as Nasha, a security agent and Mickey's love interest
- Steven Yeun as Timo, a pilot and Mickey's bad friend from Earth
- Patsy Ferran as Dorothy, a scientist
- Cameron Britton as Arkady, the head of the Science Team
- Daniel Henshall as Preston, Kenneth Marshall's personal assistant
- Stephen Park as Zeke, the head of the Security Team
- Anamaria Vartolomei as Kai Katz, a security agent
- Toni Collette as Ylfa, Kenneth Marshall's devious and controlling wife, obsessed with sauces.
- Mark Ruffalo as Kenneth Marshall, an egomaniacal failed politician with sinister designs for Niflheim
- Holliday Grainger as Red Hair, the head recruiter of the Niflheim expedition program
- Anna Mouglalis as Mama Creeper voice
- Tim Key as Pigeon Man
- Edward Davis as Alan Manikova
- Thomas Turgoose as Bazooka Soldier
- Angus Imrie as Agent Charlie
- Samuel Blenkin as Delinquent Borrower
- Ian Hanmore as Darius Blank
- Bronwyn James as Receptionist
- Ellen Robertson as Jennifer Chilton
- Haydn Gwynne as Congresswoman

== Production ==
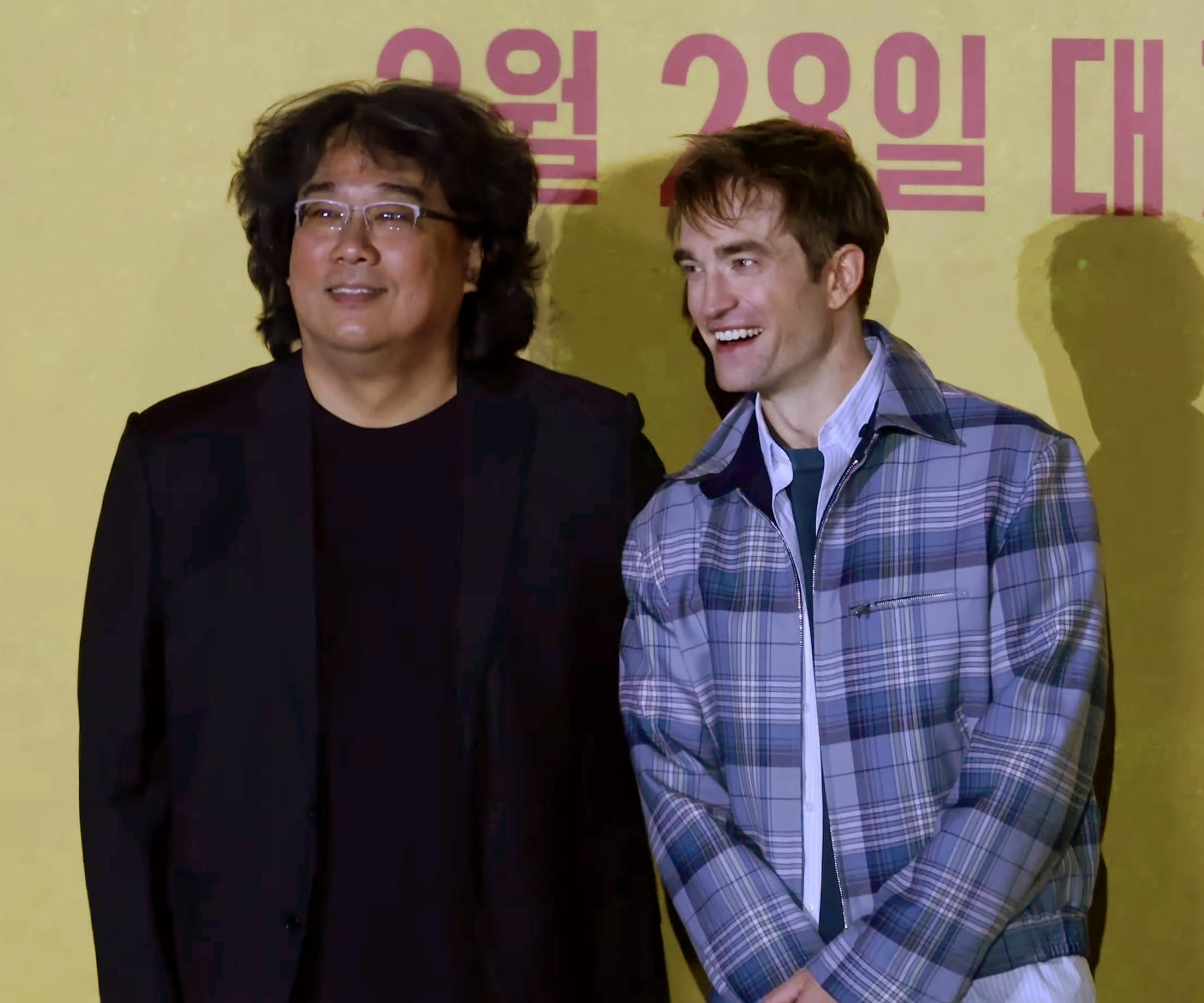
Filmmaker Bong Joon Ho and actor Robert Pattinson in 2025

A film adaptation of Edward Ashton's novel Mickey7 was announced to be in development prior to its publication in January 2022, with Bong Joon Ho writing, directing, and producing for Warner Bros. Pictures and Robert Pattinson in talks to star. Charles Yu wrote additional literary material for the film. Bong was intrigued by the concepts presented in the book, though he made many changes to the characters, including modifying Mickey's personality to be a little more simple minded. He wrote the screenplay in 2021 based on an early draft of the book, and said that none of the characters portrayed were meant to be mirroring active politicians. Being a football fan, Bong renamed some characters after football players: 17 is a shirt number of Manchester City midfielder Kevin De Bruyne, Anamaria Vartolomei's character is named after Kai Havertz, Steven Yeun's after Timo Werner, a highly paid player with an underwhelming loan spell with director's favourite football team Tottenham Hotspur. Bong claimed that "Timo" means "conman" in German.

Robert Pattinson was the first actor to come to mind for a performance that required dual roles, and he agreed immediately to take the role after being offered it. Pattinson improvised many lines as Mickey 18, who starts with an aggressive personality, then grows as a person who wants to protect 17.

Bong storyboarded each sequence before filming. Pattinson helped to revise part of the script to give what Bong described as "humor and knowledge of slang that I would have never come across otherwise." Pattinson also partially based his performance on Jim Carrey in Dumb and Dumber, citing similar comedic injuries. Bong maintained that he had final cut privilege, though there was a delay in the editing. To differentiate the two main Mickeys, Pattinson changed his accent for each character, comparing them to Ren and Stimpy from The Ren & Stimpy Show. In the initial script reading, he imitated the voices of Johnny Knoxville and Steve-O from Jackass. Bong told him not to do the Steve-O impression.

Pattinson was confirmed to star in May 2022, with Naomi Ackie, Toni Collette, and Mark Ruffalo joining the cast. In July, Steven Yeun was added to the cast. Tim Key was cast after a phone call, as Bong wanted him specifically for a role. Production began at Warner Bros. Studios, Leavesden, on August 2, 2022, and concluded in December 2022. Filming was finished in January 2023, with the director working on the ideal cut after.

The film's creepers were designed by Bong and Jang Hee-chul, who has been collaborating with Bong to create monsters for his films since The Host (2006). The VFX was done by Framestore, DNEG, Rising Sun Pictures, and Turncoat Pictures. DNEG handled all the sequences shot on the ice planet of Niflheim, and created the creepers.

=== Music ===
Jung Jae-il composed the film score in his third consecutive collaboration with Bong after Okja (2017) and Parasite (2019). The score, recorded at the Abbey Road Studios in London, was released under the WaterTower Music label on February 28, 2025.

== Release ==
=== Theatrical ===
Mickey 17 premiered at the Leicester Square in London on February 13, 2025. The film was screened at the 75th Berlin International Film Festival on February 15, 2025, before opening in South Korea on February 28, 2025, a week before its global rollout.

The film was released theatrically in the United States on March 7, 2025, by Warner Bros. Pictures. It was originally scheduled to be released on March 29, 2024 (taking the slot vacated by Godzilla x Kong: The New Empire), but was taken off the schedule due to the 2023 SAG-AFTRA strike. It was rescheduled for January 31, 2025 (where it would have opened three days earlier in South Korea), but was pushed back to April 18, 2025, to take advantage of Easter weekend and avoid competition with Dog Man. It was then pushed forward to March 7, 2025, swapping the latter date with Sinners.

=== Home media ===
Mickey 17 was released on Digital HD on April 8, 2025, and on Ultra HD Blu-ray, Blu-ray and DVD on May 13, 2025, by Warner Bros Home Entertainment. It was available for streaming on HBO Max since May 23, 2025.

== Reception ==
=== Box office ===
Mickey 17 grossed $46.1 million in the United States and Canada, and $87.4 million in other territories, for a worldwide total of $133.5 million. With a combined $198 million spent on production and marketing, it was estimated the film needed to gross $240–300 million worldwide in order to break even. Variety later reported the film would lose Warner Bros. $75–80 million during its theatrical run.

In South Korea, the film opened on February 28, 2025, and scored the highest post-pandemic debut by Warner Bros., grossing $1.7 million and surpassing the record previously set by Pattinson's 2022 film, The Batman. It went on to debut to $9 million in its opening weekend.

In the United States and Canada, Mickey 17 was projected to gross $18–20 million from 3,770 theaters in its opening weekend. It made $7.7 million on its first day, including an estimated $2.5 million from Thursday previews. It went on to debut to $19 million, which Deadline Hollywood described as in-line with original sci-fi films, including Jupiter Ascending ($18.3 million opening in 2015), Ad Astra ($19 million in 2019), and The Creator ($14 million in 2023). Because of the film's budget, the publication also projected that the film would not be immediately profitable for Warner Bros. In its second weekend, the film grossed $7.4 million (dropping 61%), finishing third behind newcomers Novocaine and Black Bag. It then made $3.7 million in its third weekend, finishing in fifth. It dropped out of the box office top ten in its seventh weekend.

=== Critical response ===
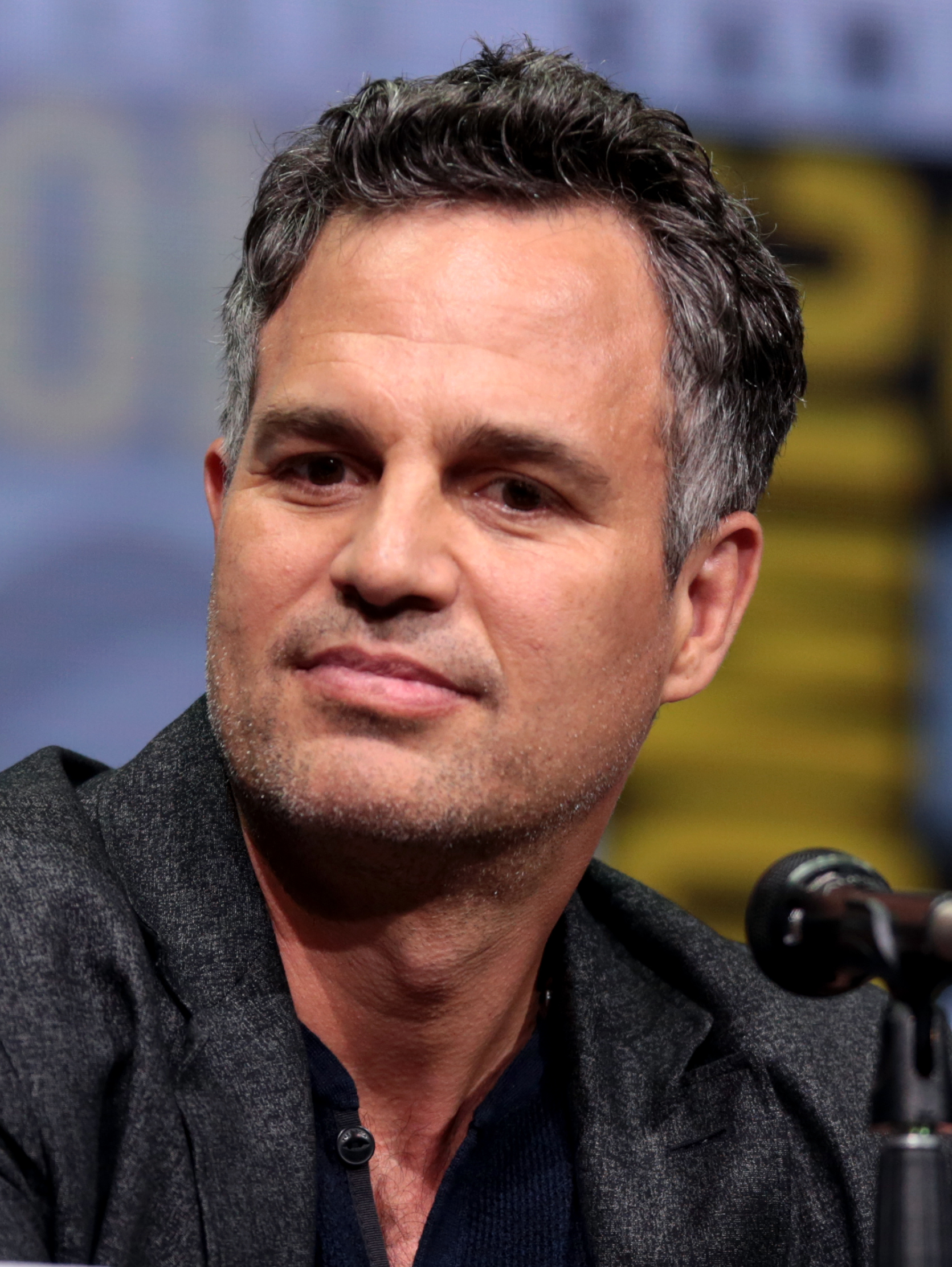
Mark Ruffalo plays Kenneth Marshall, whom critics have compared to parallel real-world authoritarian figures.

On the review aggregator website Rotten Tomatoes, 78% of 361 critics' reviews are positive, with an average rating of 7.1/10. The website's consensus reads: "Mickey 17 finds Bong Joon Ho returning to his forte of daffy sci-fi with a withering social critique at its core, proving along the way that you can never have too many Robert Pattinsons." Metacritic, which uses a weighted average, assigned the film a score of 72 out of 100, based on 60 critics, indicating "generally favorable" reviews. Audiences polled by CinemaScore gave the film an average grade of "B" on an A+ to F scale, while those surveyed by PostTrak gave it 4 out of 5 stars, with 63% saying they would definitely recommend the film.

Robbie Collin of The Daily Telegraph awarded the film 4 stars out of 5, noting: "As in much of Bong's work, its chop-and-change attitude to genre keeps his audience on their toes. The film veers from slapstick to absurdism to horror and back again, often within a single shot, such as the regular sight of the latest Pattinson clone flopping out of the meat printer with a sausagey flumph." Jacob Oller of The A.V. Club called the film "An unwieldy, long-winded, wildly entertaining sci-fi critique of our dehumanizing present." In his review for NPR, critic Justin Chang wrote that the film's satire "wears awfully thin", but that "Bong is one of the few filmmakers who can work at this scale, with elaborate production design and intricate visual effects, and still retain his artistic signature."

A less enthusiastic review came from Richard Lawson of Vanity Fair, who deemed the film a "disappointing follow-up to Parasite", while stating: "Perhaps if Bong had focused on the clone idea, more intricately exploring the corporate world's annihilating treatment of workers, he could have arrived at something rattling, even profound. Alas, he is ultimately too enamored of his wiggly animal creations, and by the broadest of jokes about TV camera-obsessed petty tyrants. In all its diminished attention span, Mickey 17 plays less like a new declaration from a great master and more like a feverish TikTok 'doom scroll' leading nowhere."

Jocelyn Noveck of the Associated Press gave the movie 2 stars out of 4, saying that although having Pattinson's character repeatedly die is an interesting plot-device, and the highlight of the film, that "much of this film devolves into narrative chaos, bloat and excess."

Kenneth Marshall, the spaceship captain and politician played by Mark Ruffalo, has been interpreted by some critics as a caricature of authoritarian leaders. For instance, Polygon describes Marshall as "a distinctly Trump-like figure whose dangerous associations with religious zealotry and white nationalism are mere avenues to earn political credibility among his base." Bong clarified that Marshall's character is not based on any specific individual but is "a mix of many different politicians [and] dictators that we have seen throughout history." Film critic Ty Burr agreed, seeing in Ruffalo's performance distinct elements of Elon Musk, Benito Mussolini, Donald Trump, and Robert F. Kennedy Jr.

=== Accolades ===
Accolades received by 28 Years Later
Award	Date of ceremony	Category	Recipients	Result	Ref.
Astra Midseason Movie Awards	July 3, 2025	Best Actor	Robert Pattinson	Runner-up	
Critics' Choice Super Awards	August 7, 2025	Best Science Fiction/Fantasy Movie	Mickey 17	Nominated	
Critics' Choice Super Awards	August 7, 2025	Best Actor in a Science Fiction/Fantasy Movie	Robert Pattinson	Nominated	
Critics' Choice Super Awards	August 7, 2025	Best Actress in a Science Fiction/Fantasy Movie	Naomi Ackie	Nominated	
Golden Trailer Awards	May 29, 2025	Best Fantasy/Adventure	Warner Bros., JAX (for "Life")	Nominated	
Golden Trailer Awards	May 29, 2025	Best Music	Warner Bros., JAX (for "Life")	Won	
Golden Trailer Awards	May 29, 2025	Best Comedy/Drama TrailerByte (Feature Film)	Warner Bros. Discovery, Tiny Hero (for "Terms and Agreements")	Nominated	
Golden Trailer Awards	May 29, 2025	Best Viral Campaign for a Feature Film	Warner Bros. Discovery, Tiny Hero	Nominated	
Golden Trailer Awards	May 29, 2025	Best BTS/EPK for a Feature Film (Under 2 minutes)	Warner Bros., Narrator Inc	Nominated	
Golden Trailer Awards	May 29, 2025	Best Action Poster	Warner Bros., Mocean	Nominated	
Golden Trailer Awards	May 29, 2025	Best Comedy Poster	Warner Bros., AV Print	Nominated	
Astra Film Awards	January 9, 2026	Best Book to Screen Adaptation	Mickey 17	Nominated	
Astra Film Awards	January 9, 2026	Best Action or Science Fiction Feature	Mickey 17	Nominated	
Visual Effects Society Awards	February 25, 2026	Outstanding Model in a Photoreal or Animated Project	Bikas Panigrahi, Nikolai Razuev, Ajinkya Nitin Phokmare, Manoj Vijay Kamble (For "The Nifleheim Spaceship")	Nominated	
Visual Effects Society Awards	February 25, 2026	Emerging Technology Award	John Bastian, Ben Ward, Thomas Rowntree, Robert Beveridge (For "REVIZE")	Nominated	
Hugo Awards	August 30, 2026	Best Dramatic Presentation, Long Form	Mickey 17 – Bong Joon Ho (director, screenplay)	Nominated	
