= A Bag of Hammers =

- Theatrical release poster
- Directed by: Brian Crano
- Written by: Brian Crano; Jake Sandvig
- Produced by: Jennifer Barrons; Brian Crano; Lucy Barzun Donnelly; Peter Friedlander
- Starring: Jason Ritter; Jake Sandvig
- Cinematography: Byron Shah; Quyen Tran
- Edited by: Brian A. Kates; Travis Sittard
- Music by: Johnny Flynn
- Distributed by: MPI Media Group
- Release date: March 12, 2011 (SXSW)
- Running time: 85 minutes
- Country: United States
- Language: English
- Budget: $2 million

A Bag of Hammers is a 2011 American comedy-drama film directed by Brian Crano. Written by him and Jake Sandvig, who co-stars in the film with Rebecca Hall and Jason Ritter. The soundtrack was written and performed by British folk musician Johnny Flynn.

== Plot ==
Ben and Alan are great friends who have known each other since high school, and they haven't grown up. For a living, they pose as valets at funerals and then steal their customers' cars and sell them to a pessimistic car dealer. Melanie, Alan's sister, encourages them to find respectable occupations, but Ben and Alan don't take Mel's advice. Then, Lynette moves into their neighborhood. She is a single mother who is financially insecure and has a short temper, as Mel finds out. When Lynette commits suicide, Alan and Ben take her son Kelsey under their wing. With the help of an unenthusiastic Mel, who deems their idea crazy, they try to involve him within their car-theft scheme. However, they come to realize that Kelsey needs more suitable role models, and Ben and Alan will have to grow up.

== Cast ==
- Jason Ritter as Ben Dwellman
- Jake Sandvig as Alan Manilow
- Chandler Canterbury as Kelsey Patterson
  - Johnny Simmons as Kelsey, age 18
- Rebecca Hall as Melanie "Mel" Manilow
- Carrie Preston as Lynette Patterson
- Todd Louiso as Marty
- Gabriel Macht as Wyatt
- Amanda Seyfried as Amanda Beekler
- Micah Hauptman as Vince Ortega
- Elmarie Wendel as The Mark

== Reception ==
=== Critical response ===
A Bag of Hammers received mixed reviews. Website Metacritic gave the film a score of 50 out of 100, indicating "mixed or average" reviews. As of June 2020, the film holds an approval rating of 62% on review aggregator Rotten Tomatoes, based on 21 reviews with an average rating of 5.42/10. Andy Webster of The New York Times wrote in his review: "A Bag of Hammers, Brian Crano's low-budget dramedy and first feature, is certainly sure of itself. Any film tossing comic interludes among its closing credits has to be convinced of their hilarity and of the good will the movie has earned with viewers by then. Perhaps the film's naked traffic in sentiment up to that point made Mr. Crano so bold. Whatever; his confidence was unwarranted." John DeFore of The Hollywood Reporter wrote in his review: "First-time director Brian Crano delivers a muddled comedy starring Jason Ritter and Rebecca Hall about two felons who unexpectedly wind up taking care of a neglected child."

Scott Tobias of The A.V. Club enjoyed the film and gave it a B−.

A Bag of Hammers, on both sides of the camera, rests in the push-and-pull between sincerity and indie piffle... It's a struggle all the way for A Bag of Hammers, though its irony-crusted heart is in the right place... A Bag of Hammers flounders whenever it focuses on the pair's insufferable banter, or allows its soundtrack to do the heavy lifting. But the bigger problem is Crano's oddly structured screenplay.

Other reviewers, such as Nick Schager of Time Out New York hated the film, giving it one star out of five.

Grifting is all fun and games until a young boy needs help in this preposterous dramedy... The real scam was the filmmakers tricking Rebecca Hall (and a cameoing Amanda Seyfried) into participating in this blunt instrument of an indie.

=== Release ===
A Bag of Hammers was released for a limited time starting March 12, 2011, at the SXSW festival and in theatres May 12, 2012. The film was released on DVD on June 19, 2012, by MPI Home Video.

=== Accolades ===
Year	Award	Category	Recipient(s)	Result	Ref.
2013	Young Artist Award	Best Performance in a Feature Film - Leading Young Actor Ten and Under	Chandler Canterbury	Nominated	
