= Country Mile (Johnny Flynn album) =

Studio album by Johnny Flynn & The Sussex Wit
- Released: September 30, 2013
- Genre: Folk
- Length: 39:28
- Language: English
- Label: Transgressive

Johnny Flynn & The Sussex Wit chronology
A Film Score Of A Bag of Hammers (soundtrack) (2012)	Country Mile (2013)	Sillion (2017)

Country Mile is the fourth full-length album by Johnny Flynn, released in 2013. The album was recorded with members of his backing band The Sussex Wit and was announced in conjunction with a tour, as well as the release of a single "The Lady is Risen". Country Mile was issued by Transgressive Records and became Flynn's first UK Top 75 hit, peaking at number 58 on the chart dated 12 October 2013.

== Reception ==
Professional ratings
Review scores
Source	Rating
Allmusic	4/5 stars
The Independent	4/5 stars
The Line of Best Fit	7/10 stars
musicOMH	3.5/5 stars
NME	(2.5/5)
This Is Fake DIY	3/5 stars

In his review for Allmusic, critic Timothy Monger wrote "What sets Johnny Flynn apart from many of Britain's better-known new folk-revivalists is his knack for timeless, literate songwriting. Delivered with the confidence of a seasoned Shakespearian actor and the severity and humor of a young Richard Thompson, Flynn's songs come from a more arcane place in the English idiom, managing to seem both profound and conversational at once."

Holly Williams of The Independent wrote "Flynn’s language and cadence can be quaintly archaic; his wandering-minstrel lyrics poetic, and apple-sweet." John Murphy of musicOMH wrote "Flynn remains one of the country’s most overlooked songwriters and Country Mile is a good reminder of his skill with a well-crafted song."

Matthew Horton of NME was less enthusiastic about the release, writing "Johnny Flynn moonlights as an actor, and it shows. His folk-rock has always felt a bit forced, and album number three is rootsy like the Chelsea Flower Show, blooming with mega-twee lyrics... There’s even a song called ‘Tinker’s Trail’, for Christ’s sake. If things get any more contrived his next album will feature a duet with a cow."

== Track listing ==
All songs composed by Johnny Flynn

No.	Title	Length
1.	"Country Mile"	3:36
2.	"After Eliot"	4:45
3.	"The Lady Is Risen"	3:27
4.	"Murmuration"	2:52
5.	"Gypsy Hymn"	3:44
6.	"Fol-de-rol"	3:33
7.	"Einstein's Idea"	5:49
8.	"Tinker's Trail"	3:26
9.	"Bottom Of The Sea Blues"	4:08
10.	"Time Unremembered"	4:08

== Personnel ==
- Johnny Flynn – vocals, guitar, bass, harmonium, mandolin, piano, organ, violin, trumpet, Wurlitzer, flugelhorn, percussion
- Spencer Cullum – pedal steel guitar
- Adam Beach – bass
- David Beauchamp – drums
- Joe Zeitlin – cello
- James Mathé – backing vocals
- Lillie Flynn – backing vocals

== Production ==
- Mark Ospovat – engineer
- Giles Barrett – engineer, mixing
- Simon Trought – engineer, mixing
- David Holmes – engineer, mixing
- Guy Davie – mastering
- Luke Montgomery – cover photo
- Lisa Piercy – art direction
- A.G. Brooks – design
