= Naomi Ackie =

English actress (born 1991)

- Ackie at London Film Festival in 2026
- Born: 22 August 1991 (age 35); Walthamstow, London, England
- Education: Royal Central School of Speech and Drama (BA)
- Occupation: Actress
- Years active: 2009–present

Naomi Sarah Ackie (born 22 August 1991) is an English actress. For her role in the television series The End of the F***ing World (2019), she won the BAFTA TV Award for Best Supporting Actress. She also featured in the third series of Master of None (2021) as well as film roles in Star Wars: The Rise of Skywalker (2019), I Wanna Dance with Somebody (2022), Blink Twice (2024), Sorry, Baby (2025), Mickey 17 (2025), I Love Boosters (2026), and Clayface (2026).

== Early life and education ==
Naomi Sarah Ackie was born on 22 August 1991 in Walthamstow, London, the daughter of second-generation Grenadian immigrants. Her father is a retired TfL employee, her mother worked for the NHS. Ackie has an older brother and sister.

She went to Walthamstow School for Girls. Her first role was at the age of 11, playing the angel Gabriel in a school nativity play.

She studied at the Royal Central School of Speech and Drama and graduated in 2012 from the Acting (Collaborative DevisedTheatre) course. She has developed keen interests in Pilates and Sociology.

== Career ==
Ackie's breakthrough film role was in Lady Macbeth (2016), for which she won the British Independent Film Award for Most Promising Newcomer in 2017.

She subsequently appeared in Idris Elba's directorial debut Yardie (2018) and Star Wars: The Rise of Skywalker (2019). She also portrayed Bonnie in the second season of Netflix's black comedy series The End of the F***ing World, and a school inspector in Education, an hour-long drama part of Steve McQueen's anthology film series Small Axe.

Ackie portrayed American singer Whitney Houston in the biographical film I Wanna Dance with Somebody (2022). The film opened to mixed reviews but widespread praise for Ackie's performance, with Variety calling her "a veritable artist of lip-syncing." The Hollywood Reporter noted that Ackie herself is "a capable singer" and can be heard briefly in a few early scenes.

Ackie starred in Zoë Kravitz's directorial debut Blink Twice in 2024, and a year later starred opposite Robert Pattinson in Bong Joon Ho's Mickey 17, an adaptation of the science-fiction novel. In the same year, Ackie starred in Eva Victor's directorial debut, Sorry Baby, alongside Victor and Lucas Hedges.

== Filmography ==
=== Film ===
Key
†	Denotes films that have not yet been released

Year	Title	Role	Notes
2015	I Used to Be Famous	Amber	Short film
2016	Lady Macbeth	Anna	
2018	Yardie	Mona	
2019	The Corrupted	Grace	
2019	Star Wars: The Rise of Skywalker	Jannah	
2021	The Score	Gloria	
2022	I Wanna Dance with Somebody	Whitney Houston	Also executive producer
2024	Blink Twice	Frida	
2024	2073	Professor	
2025	Sorry, Baby	Lydie	
2025	Mickey 17	Nasha Adjaya	
2025	The Thursday Murder Club	Donna De Freitas	
2026	Shelter	Chief Roberta Frost	
2026	I Love Boosters	Sade	
2026	Clayface	Dr. Caitlyn Corr	
TBA	They Follow †	TBA	Post-production
TBA	To Make Ends Meat †	TBA	Post-production
TBA	Sugar Raye †	Raye	Post-production

=== Television ===
Year	Title	Role	Notes
2015	Doctor Who	Jen	Episode: "Face the Raven"
2016	The Five	Gemma Morgan	Miniseries, 2 episodes
2016	Damilola, Our Loved Boy	Council Worker	Television film
2018	Vera	Louise Everitt	Episode: "Black Ice"
2018	The Bisexual	Ruby	Recurring role
2019	Cleaning Up	Beth	2 episodes
2019	The End of the F***ing World	Bonnie	Main cast (season 2)
2020	Small Axe	Hazel	Episode: "Education"
2021	Master of None	Alicia	Main cast (season 3)
2024	Lego Star Wars: Rebuild the Galaxy	Jedi Jannah (voice)	Miniseries, 1 episode

=== Stage ===
Year	Title	Role	Venue	Notes
2009	Success	Lucy	National Theatre, London	with Islington Youth Theatre
2012	The Day the Waters Came	Esther	UK Tour	with Theatre Centre
2013	The Snow Queen	Gowrie	Greenwich Theatre, London	
2013	Life Mould	Rita	Canada Water Library, London	as part of "Write Lines Conference" by Theatre Centre
2013	Missing	Kevin Godsen	Engineer Theatre, Edinburgh	as part of Edinburgh Festival Fringe
2013	Billy the Girl	Amber	Soho Theatre, London	
2015	The Nutcracker and the Mouse King	Mama	Unicorn Theatre, London	
2015	Walking the Tightrope	Mercedes	Theatre Delicatessen	
2015	Solace of the Road	Grace Gibson	Derby Theatre, Derby	

=== Video game ===
Year	Title	Role
2022	Lego Star Wars: The Skywalker Saga	Jannah

== Awards and nominations ==
Year	Award	Category	Work	Result	Ref.
2017	British Independent Film Award	Best Supporting Actress	Lady Macbeth	Nominated	
2017	British Independent Film Award	Most Promising Newcomer	Lady Macbeth	Won	
2017	Evening Standard British Film Award	Best Supporting Actress	Lady Macbeth	Nominated	
2017	Screen International Star of Tomorrow	2017 Actors	—N/a	Won	
2020	British Academy Television Award	Best Supporting Actress	The End of the F***ing World	Won	
2021	Black Reel Award for Television	Outstanding Supporting Actress in a Comedy Series	Master of None	Nominated	
2023	British Academy Film Awards	EE Rising Star Award	—N/a	Nominated	
2023	Trophée Chopard	Female Revelation of the Year	—N/a	Won	
2026	Film Independent Spirit Awards	Best Supporting Performance	Sorry, Baby	Won	
2026	London Film Critics Circle Awards	British/Irish Performer of the Year	Sorry, Baby, Mickey 17, and The Thursday Murder Club	Nominated	
