= Glória Halász =

Hungarian documentary film director

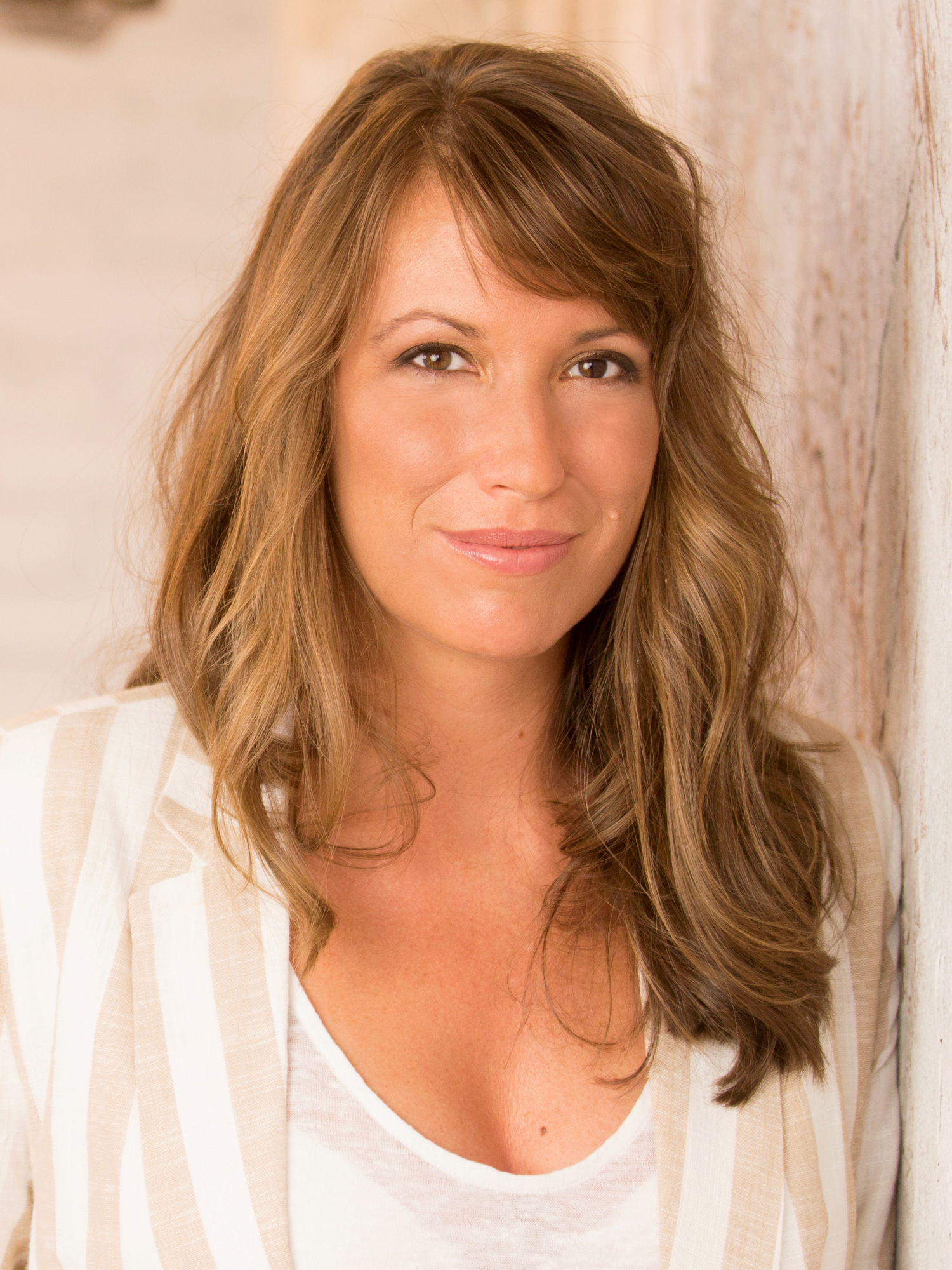
Glória Halász in 2019 (photo: Tamás Lékó)

Glória Halász is a Hungarian film director.

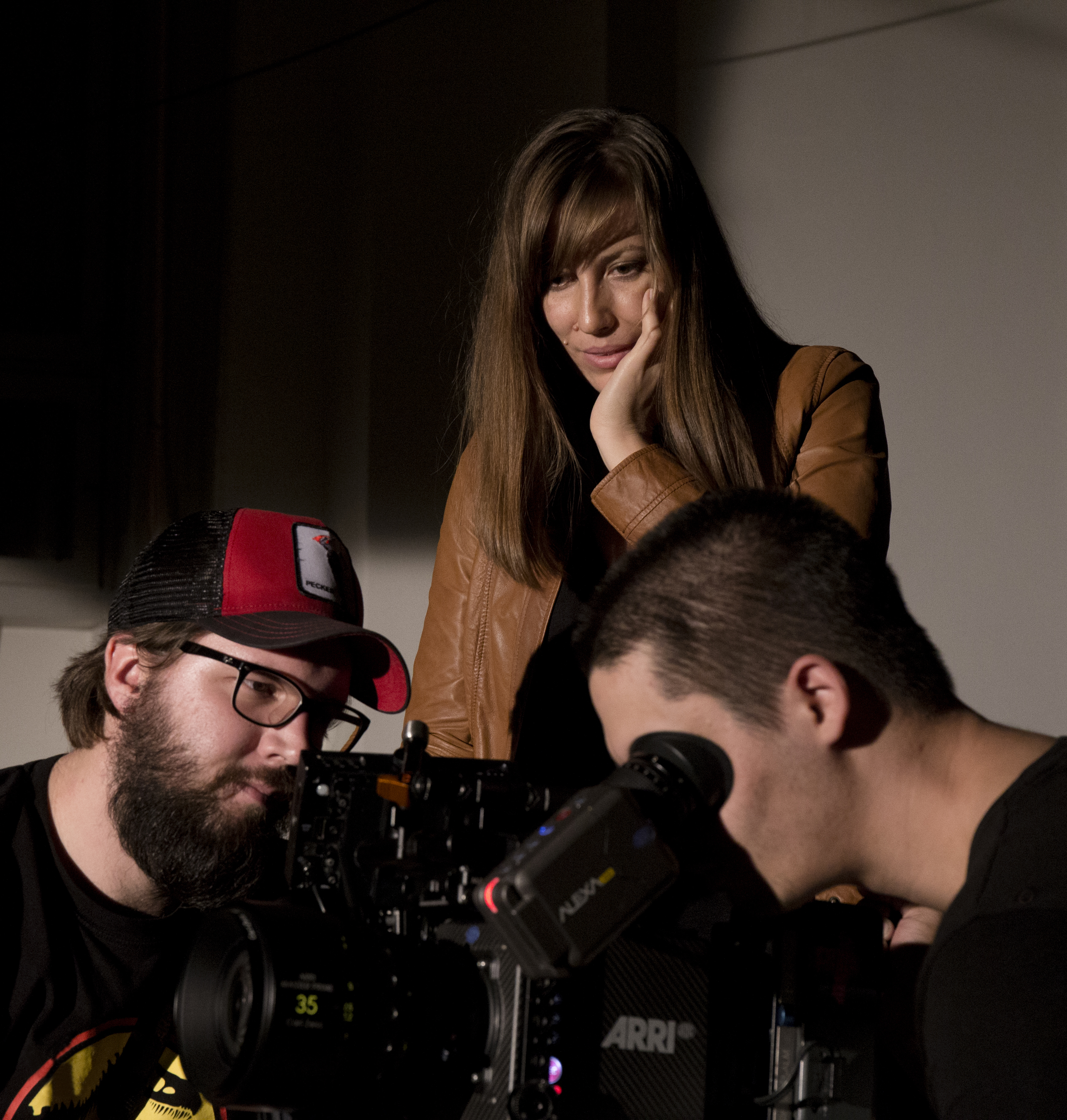
Glória Halász at the shooting of Alla Zingara (photo: János Perl)

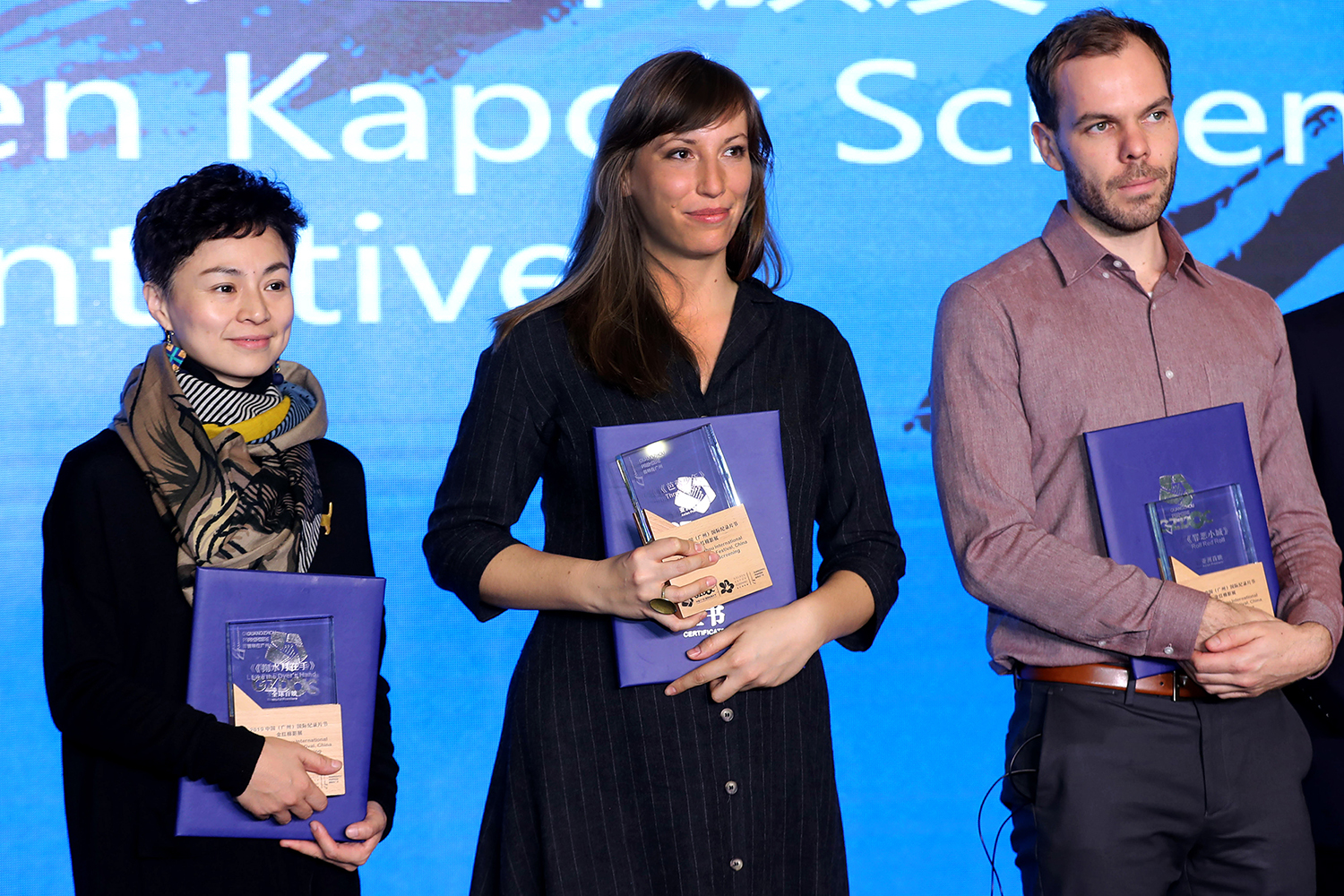
Glória Halász at the award ceremony of GZDOC Guangzhou International Documentary Film Festival in China

== Career ==
Glória Halász was born in Budapest. She attended Eötvös Loránd University.

Glória Halász directed eight full-length documentaries, including many international co-productions, which were featured and awarded at acknowledged film festivals, gained main prizes including the Grand Jury Award of UNAFF (United Nations Association Film Festival). Her fiction short film Paravan had its world premiere at the Oscar-qualifying Santa Fe International Film Festival in the United States. She is currently preparing for her fictional feature film titled Puppetry. Her projects are internationally distributed and broadcast worldwide in association with companies like Journeyman Entertainment (United Kingdom) and ORF-Enterprise (Austria). Amongst others she has developed and created various film projects on a wide variety of topics, including films about a jail theatre company, a clown doctor, women in India and their surviving story after major acid attacks, classical ballet students, the 100-Member Budapest Gypsy Symphony Orchestra, or a special class of Hungarian circus artists, who spent a semester in Kyiv. She was invited as a jury member for EPOS International Art Film Festival in Israel, Budapest Independent Film Festival, CineFest Miskolc International Film Festival and International Film Festival ART FILM (IFF ART FILM) Kosice. The relationship between fantasy and reality is a recurring issue in both her documentary and fiction works, exploring how imagination can be a handhold in a seemingly hopeless situation.

== Filmography ==
- Iron Curtain (2011)
- Dr. Lala (2014)
- What a Circus! (2016)
- Rupa's Boutique (2017)
- Three Dances (2018)
- Alla Zingara (2019)
- Circus Siblings (2023)
- Who Cares About Pal Frenak (2025)
- Paravan (2025)

== Awards and nominations ==
- Outstanding Direction in a Documentary Film – Chita Rivera Awards, New York, United States
- Grand Jury Award for Best Documentary – UNAFF (United Nations Association Film Festival), Palo Alto, Stanford, United States
- Best Feature Film Award – WOMEN Media Arts and Film Festival, Sydney, Australia
- Grand Prix for the Best Movie of the Festival – Prvi Kadar International Film Festival, Sarajevo, Bosnia and Herzegovina
- Best Documentary – Opuzen Film Festival, Croatia
- Best Documentary – CineFest International Film Festival
- Best Documentary – National Independent Film Festival
