= 1764 in literature =

This article is a summary of literary events and publications during 1764.

== Events ==
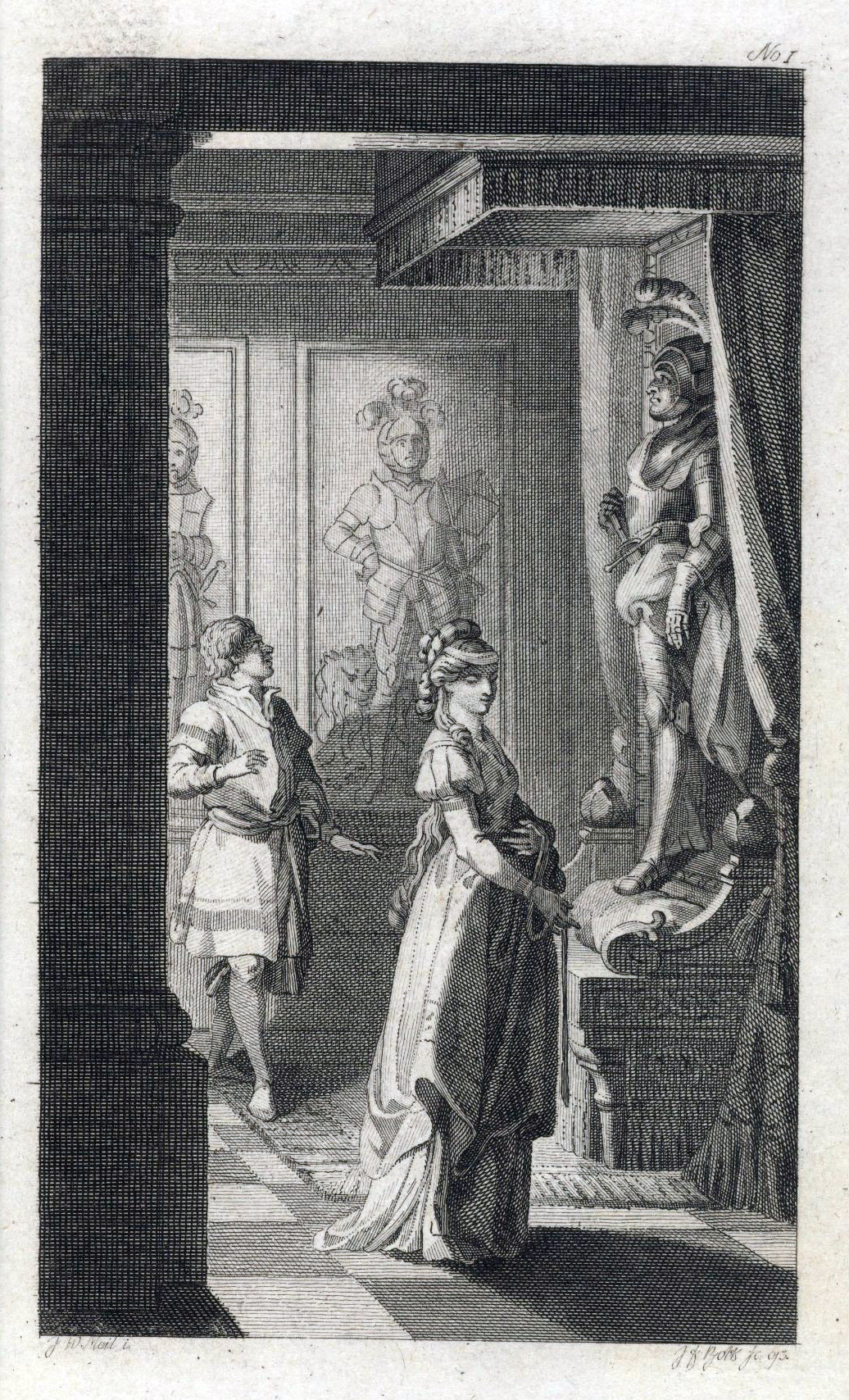
Illustration pf The Castle of Otranto from a 1794 German edition

- January 19 – John Wilkes is expelled from the British House of Commons for seditious libel in an article criticizing King George III in The North Briton.
- February – Samuel Johnson co-founds The Club, a literary dining club in London.
- June 21 – The Quebec Gazette newspaper begins publication; its successor survives.
- October 15 – While visiting Rome, Edward Gibbon conceives the idea for The History of the Decline and Fall of the Roman Empire "as I sat musing amidst the ruins of the Capitol, while the barefooted fryars were singing Vespers in the temple of Jupiter". Gibbon is at the Franciscan Basilica of Santa Maria in Aracoeli on the Capitoline Hill, actually the site of the Temple of Juno.
- October 29 – The Hartford Courant newspaper is founded in Connecticut.
- December 24 – Horace Walpole's The Castle of Otranto ("A Story. Translated by William Marshal, Gent. From the Original Italian of Onuphrio Muralto, Canon of the Church of St. Nicholas at Otranto"), the first Gothic novel, is published by his Strawberry Hill Press in England. In the second edition, Walpole applied the word 'Gothic' to the novel in the subtitle – A Gothic Story. Set in a haunted castle, the novel merged medievalism and terror in a style that has endured ever since. The aesthetic of the book has shaped modern-day Gothic romance/horror books, films, art, music, and the Goth subculture.
- unknown dates
  - The French scholar Jean-Jacques Barthélemy deciphers the Phoenician language using inscriptions on the Cippi of Melqart from Malta.
  - Mme. Necker and Mlle. de Lespinasse establish literary salons in Paris.

== New books ==
=== Fiction ===
- John Cleland – The Surprises of Love
- Phebe Gibbes
  - The History of Lady Louisa Stroud and the Honorable Miss Caroline Stretton
  - The Life and Adventures of Mr. Francis Clive
- Susannah Minifie – Family Pictures
- George Psalmanazar (pseudonym) – Memoirs of ***, Commonly Known by the Name of George Psalamanazar
- James Ridley (as Sir Charles Morell) – The Tales of the Genii
- Horace Walpole – The Castle of Otranto

=== Drama ===
- Samuel Foote – The Patron
- Antoine-Marin Lemierre – Idomne
- Arthur Murphy
  - No One's Enemy But His Own
  - What We Must All Come To
- Kane O'Hara – Midas
- Christopher Smart – Hannah
- Ramón de la Cruz – El petimetre

=== Poetry ===
- Charles Churchill
  - The Candidate
  - The Duellist
  - The Farewell
  - Gotham (book i)
  - Independence
  - The Times
- John Gilbert Cooper – Poems
- Oliver Goldsmith – The Traveller
- James Grainger – The Sugar-Cane
- Johann Georg Jacobi – Poetische Versuche
- Edward Jerningham – The Nun
- George Keate – The Ruins of Netley Abbey
- Mary Latter – Liberty and Interest: a Burlesque Poem on the Present Times
- William Mason – Poems
- William Williams Pantycelyn – Bywyd a Marwolaeth Theomemphus (in Welsh)
- Christopher Smart – A Poetical Translation of the Fables of Phaedrus
- Thomas Warton – The Oxford Sausage

=== Non-fiction ===
- David Erskine Baker – The Companion to the Play-house (dictionary of dramatists and plays)
- John Barrow – Dictionary of Arts and Sciences
- Cesare Beccaria (anonymous) – On Crimes and Punishments (Dei delitti e delle pene)
- Charles Bonnet – Contemplation de la nature
- Oliver Goldsmith – An History of England
- Edward, Lord Herbert of Cherbury (posthumously) – The Life of Edward, Lord Herbert of Cherbury (concluded 1624)
- Immanuel Kant – Observations on the Feeling of the Beautiful and Sublime (Beobachtungen über das Gefühl des Schönen und Erhabenen)
- Gottfried Leibniz (posthumous) – New Essays on Human Understanding (Nouveaux essais sur l'entendement humain) (completed 1704)
- John Newton (anonymous) – An Authentic Narrative of Some Remarkable And Interesting Particulars in the Life of ------ Communicated, in a Series of Letters, to the Reverend T. Haweiss (autobiography)
- Francisco Mariano Nipho – La nación española defendida de los insultos del Pensador y sus secuaces
- Anthony Purver – A New and Literal Translation of all the Books of the Old and New Testament (Bible)
- Thomas Reid – An Inquiry into the Human Mind on the Principles of Common Sense
- William Shenstone (posthumous) – Works
- Voltaire
  - Dictionnaire philosophique (Philosophical Dictionary)
  - Commentaires sur Corneille
- Johann Joachim Winckelmann – Geschichte der Kunst des Alterthums (History of Ancient Art)

== Births ==
- January 23 – Morris Birkbeck, American writer and social reformer (died 1825)
- February 11 – Joseph Chénier, French poet (died 1811)
- March 6 – Catharina Heybeek, Dutch journalist, feminist and editor (died 1810)
- April 29 – Ann Hatton (Ann of Swansea), English novelist (died 1838)
- May 7 – Therese Huber, German writer and scholar (died 1829)
- June 19 – John Barrow, English writer, geographer and linguist (died 1848)
- June 23 – Gabriel-Marie Legouvé, French poet and dramatist (died 1812)
- July 4 – Prokop František Šedivý, Czech playwright, actor, and translator (died c. 1810)
- July 9 – Ann Radcliffe, English Gothic novelist (died 1823)
- August 18 – Judah Leib Ben-Ze'ev, Galician Jewish modern Hebrew philologist, lexicographer, Biblical scholar and poet (died 1811)
- October 19 – Victor-Joseph Étienne de Jouy, French dramatist (died 1846)
- November 1 – Frederick Reynolds, English dramatist (died 1841)
- December 3 – Mary Lamb, English miscellanist and co-author with brother Charles Lamb (died 1847)
- unknown date – Sophie de Condorcet, French salonist and feminist (d. 1822)

== Deaths ==
- April 17 – Johann Mattheson, German writer, lexicographer and musician (born 1681)
- June 18 – Christmas Samuel, Welsh-language writer and Independent minister (born 1674)
- July 30 – Philipp Hafner, Austrian writer of farce (born 1735)
- September 23 – Robert Dodsley, English miscellanist and bookseller (born 1703)
- October 23 – Pierre-Charles Roy, French poet and librettist (born 1683)
- November 1 – Agustín de Montiano y Luyando, Spanish dramatist (born 1697)
- November 4 – Charles Churchill, English poet and satirist (born 1731)
- December 15 – Robert Lloyd, English poet and satirist (born 1733)
- December 18 – Mattheus Pinna da Encarnaçao, Spanish Benedictine theologian (born 1687)
