= Sadak in Search of the Waters of Oblivion =

Painting by John Martin (Saint Louis Art Museum)

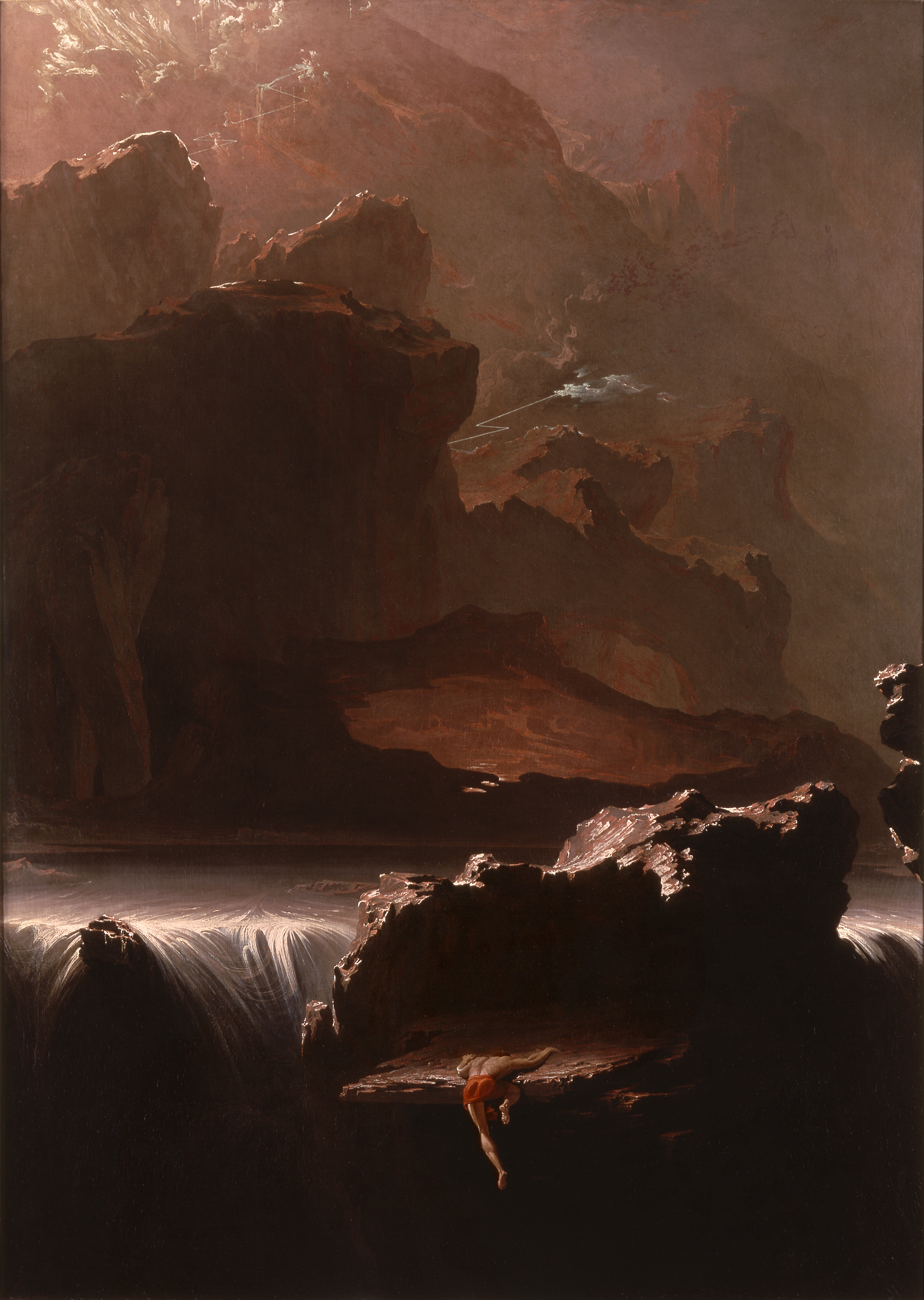
Sadak in Search of the Waters of Oblivion

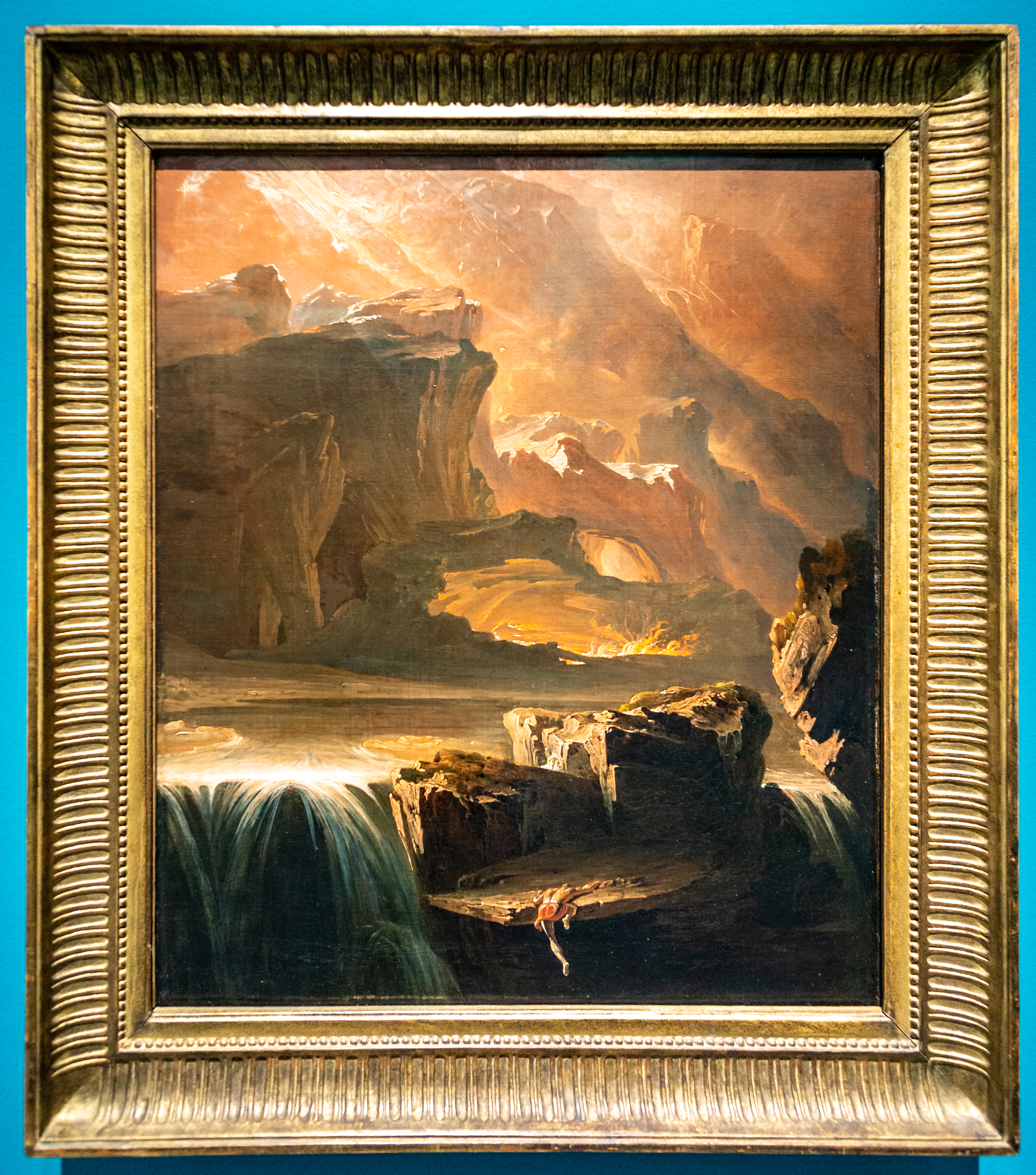
Version in the Southampton City Art Gallery

Sadak in Search of the Waters of Oblivion is an 1812 oil painting by John Martin. It has been called "the most famous of the British romantic works"; it was the first of Martin's characteristically dramatic, grand, grandiose large pictures, and anchored the development of the style for which Martin would become famous.

The painting shows a human figure climbing in a mountain landscape. The man struggles to surmount a rocky outcrop beside a pool and waterfall; more jagged cliffs and peaks loom in the background, vastly receding. Martin later stated that he finished the work in a month. And he wrote, "You may easily guess my anxiety when I overheard the men who were to place it in the frame disputing as to which was the top of the picture! Hope almost forsook me, for much depended on this work." (At the time, Martin had left his £2-per-week job as a glass painter in a china factory, and was attempting to establish himself as an independent artist.)

The artist's anxiety was unnecessary; displayed in the Royal Academy exhibition at Somerset House, the picture was a popular success. It was purchased for fifty guineas by William Manning, a member of the board of governors of the Bank of England. Reportedly, Manning's "dying son had been moved by its depiction of the slight solitary figure clinging perilously to a ledge."

For many years the painting was known only in a reduced version in the Southampton City Art Gallery. The full-size original was discovered in Sweden and acquired by the Saint Louis Art Museum in 1983.

== Analysis ==
"What makes the work so remarkable is its persuasive combination of science and fantasy: while the scale seems beyond terrestrial experience, the attention given to geological and meteorological phenomena is that of the knowledgeable observer." Critics who accept the conventions of Romanticism in art have appreciated Martin's Sadak; those who do not have regarded the picture as lurid or puzzling.

Martin's Romantic style can be seen as influenced by prevailing Promethean zeitgeist. This is the story of Prometheus, the Greek god who betrayed Zeus and stole the secret gift of fire. Eventually this became a popular metaphor to depict in romantic works of art, because romantics were known for employing the role of nature vs. man in their works. They believed that humans were obsolete to the natural world around them. Due to this interpretation, Sadak is drawn to a much smaller scale than the landscape that surrounds him, revealing that he stands no chance against the power of nature. Also, romanticism arose during the industrial revolution, a time when engineers and scientists were exploring nature's secret gifts, analogous to the act of Prometheus stealing the secret gift of fire. Romantics portray the unknown of nature with its unpredictability, intractability, and barbaric capabilities as an opposite of the Enlightenment thought. This can be seen in the background of Sadak in Search of the Waters of Oblivion with an erupting volcano taking place in an other worldly dimension. The idea behind the piece was not to render a precise location and to be accurate in its depiction, but to express the emotion that was being experienced by the subject.

Another key factor of Martin's style can also be seen as "end of the world" or "apocalyptic". Although, he depicts a grim scene Martin shows a mere chance of hope in the distance. A glimmering stream of light beams in the corner, giving the viewer a sense of aspiration.

Sadak is a fictional character in a story in James Ridley's The Tales of the Genii (two volumes, 1764); it is a faux-Oriental tale allegedly from a Persian manuscript, but actually the work of Ridley himself. In Ridley's story, the hero Sadak is sent by his Sultan, Amurath, to find the memory-destroying "waters of oblivion." The Sultan maliciously intends to use the waters on Sadak's wife Kalasrade in a seduction attempt. Sadak endures a range of trials—a tempest at sea, a plague, evil genii, a subterranean whirlpool —before he attains his goal. In the end, the Sultan himself falls victim to the water's effect. Amurath dies; Sadak becomes Sultan. Martin's picture portrays Sadak at the climax of his struggle, just before he reaches the waters of oblivion.

(Ridley's tale was popular in its era, and was adapted into a play by Thomas John Dibdin, titled Sadak and Kalasrade, which was staged in 1797. Henry Bishop mounted an operatic version in 1814.)

The picture was reproduced as a steel-plate etching in 1828. The print bore a poem on the same subject, "Sadak the Wanderer," which was attributed by some to Percy Bysshe Shelley. Modern editors of Shelley are skeptical.

With this and his subsequent paintings, Martin gained a reputation for replicating the effects of stained glass on canvas. He employed a strong "chemical red" hue to express volcanic landscapes.

Martin followed Sadak with Adam's First Sight of Eve (1813) and Clytie (1814), both shown at the Royal Academy.
