= Marquis de Condorcet =

French philosopher and mathematician (1743–1794)

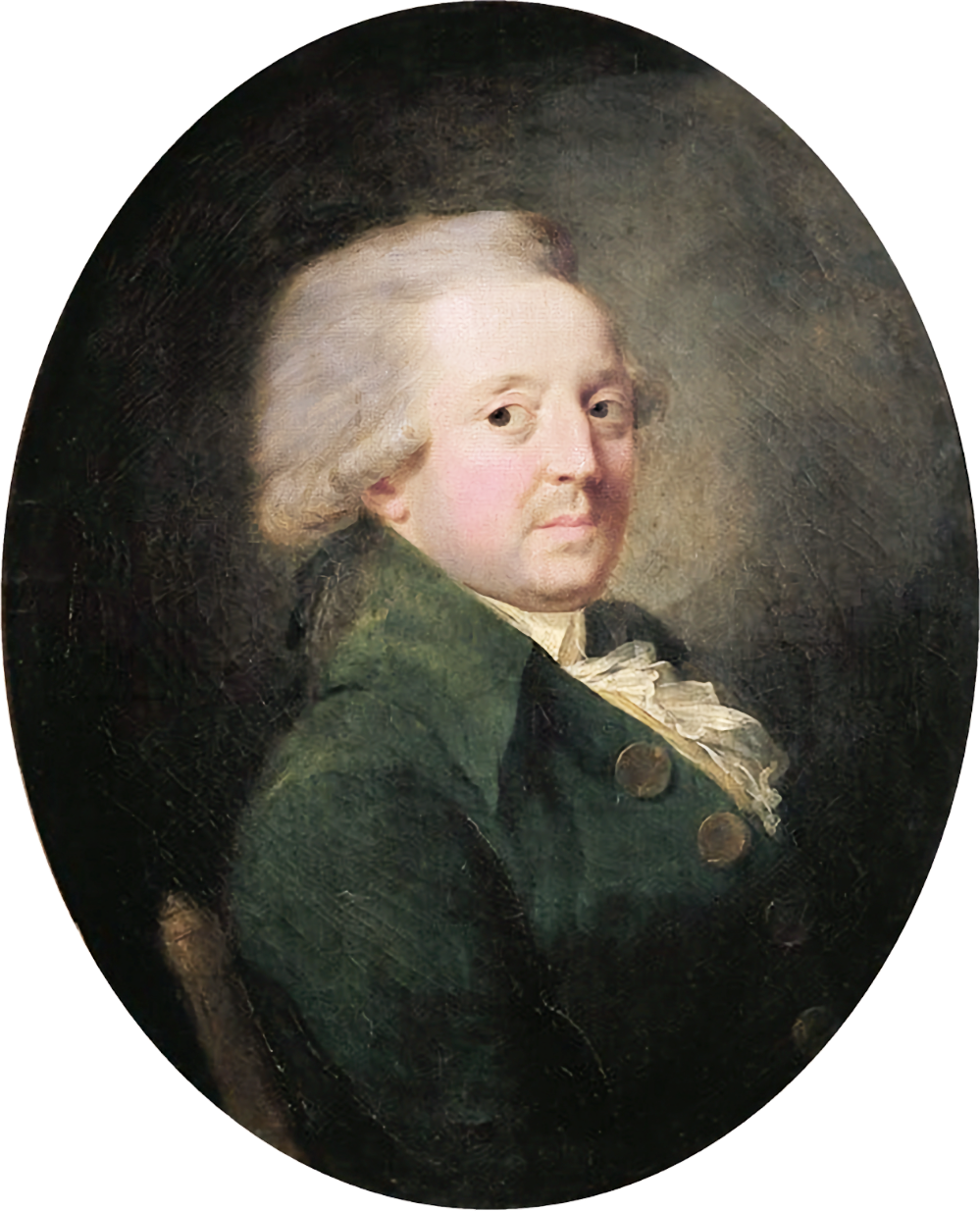

Member of the National Convention for Aisne
- In office 20 September 1792 – 8 July 1793
- Preceded by: Louis-Jean-Samuel Joly de Bammeville
- Succeeded by: Vacant (1794–1795); Successor unknown
- Constituency: Saint-Quentin

Member of the Legislative Assembly for Seine
- In office 6 September 1791 – 6 September 1792
- Succeeded by: Joseph François Laignelot
- Constituency: Paris

Personal details
- Born: Marie Jean Antoine Nicolas de Caritat; 17 September 1743 Ribemont, Picardy, France
- Died: 29 March 1794 (aged 50) Bourg-la-Reine, France
- Party: Girondin
- Spouse: Sophie de Condorcet (m. 1786)
- Children: Alexandrine de Caritat de Condorcet
- Education: College of Navarre
- Profession: Scholar, mathematician, philosopher

Philosophical work
- Era: 18th-century philosophy
- Region: Western philosophy
- School: Enlightenment; Classical liberalism Economic liberalism
- Main interests: Mathematics, politics
- Notable works: Girondin constitutional project, Sketch for a Historical Picture of the Progress of the Human Mind
- Notable ideas: Progress, Condorcet criterion, Condorcet's jury theorem, Condorcet method, Condorcet's voting paradox

Marie Jean Antoine Nicolas de Caritat, Marquis of Condorcet (/kɒndɔːrˈseɪ/; French: [maʁi ʒɑ̃ ɑ̃twan nikɔla də kaʁita maʁki də kɔ̃dɔʁsɛ]; 17 September 1743 – 29 March 1794), known as Nicolas de Condorcet, was a French philosopher, political economist, politician, and mathematician. His ideas, including support for free markets, public education, constitutional government, and equal rights for women and people of all races, and a welfare state have been said to embody the ideals of the Age of Enlightenment, of which he has been called the "last witness", and Enlightenment rationalism. As he was a critic of the constitution proposed by Marie-Jean Hérault de Séchelles in 1793, the Convention Nationale – and the Jacobin faction in particular – voted to have Condorcet arrested. He died in prison after a period of hiding from the French Revolutionary authorities.

== Early years ==
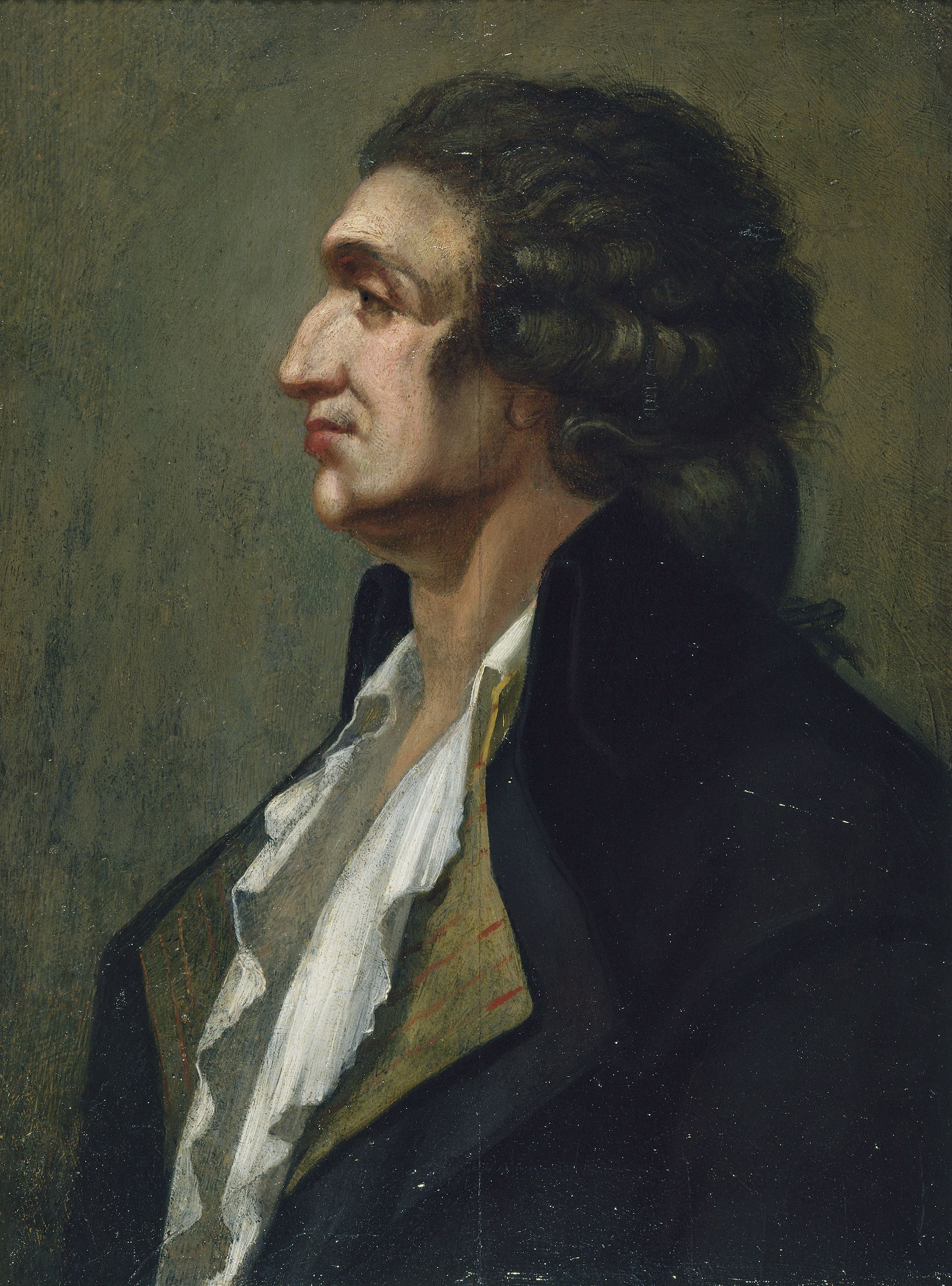
Portrait of Condorcet before 1794

Condorcet was born in Ribemont (in present-day Aisne), descended from the ancient family of Caritat, who took their title from the town of Condorcet in Dauphiné, of which they were long-time residents. Fatherless at a young age, he was taken care of by his devoutly religious mother who dressed him as a girl till age eight. He was educated at the Jesuit College in Reims and at the Collège de Navarre in Paris, where he quickly showed his intellectual ability and gained his first public distinctions in mathematics. When he was sixteen, his analytical abilities gained the praise of Jean le Rond d'Alembert and Alexis Clairaut; soon, Condorcet would study under d'Alembert. Through d'Alembert, he became involved with the philosophes associated with the salon of Julie de Lespinasse. D'Alembert also introduced Condorcet to Voltaire at Ferney in 1770.

From 1765 to 1774, he focused on science. In 1765, he published his first work on mathematics, entitled Essai sur le calcul intégral, which was well received, launching his career as a mathematician. He went on to publish more papers, and on 25 February 1769, he was elected to the Académie royale des Sciences. In 1772, he published another paper on integral calculus. Soon after, he met Jacques Turgot, a French economist, and the two became friends. Turgot became an administrator under King Louis XV in 1772 and Controller-General of Finance under Louis XVI in 1774.

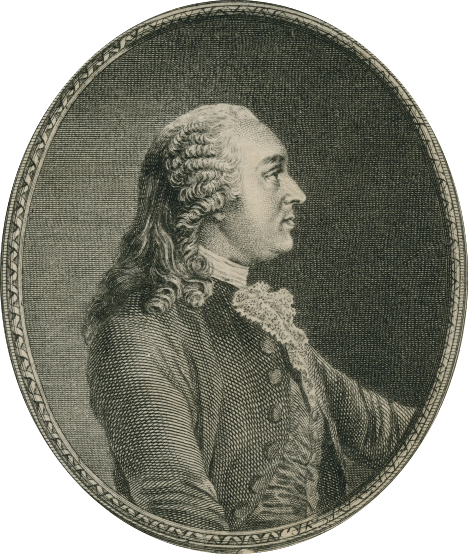
Jacques Turgot was Condorcet's mentor and longtime friend

In 1774, Condorcet wrote the "bitterly anticlerical" work Lettres d'un théologien à l'auteur du Dictionnaire des trois siècles (Letters of a theologian to the author of the Dictionary of three centuries), which Voltaire called "the declaration of a hideous war."

Condorcet worked with Leonhard Euler and Benjamin Franklin. He soon became an honorary member of many foreign academies and philosophic societies, including the American Philosophical Society (1775), the Royal Swedish Academy of Sciences (1785), the American Academy of Arts and Sciences (1792) and also in Prussia and Russia.

His political ideas, many in congruity with Turgot's, were criticized heavily in the English-speaking world, however, most notably by John Adams who wrote two of his principal works of political philosophy to oppose Turgot's and Condorcet's unicameral legislature and radical democracy.

== Early political career ==
Condorcet supported Turgot's efforts to create a national economy on a laissez-faire basis, serving him as an unofficial scientific attaché, adviser, and propagandist. In 1774, Condorcet was appointed inspector general of the Paris mint by Turgot. From this point on, Condorcet shifted his focus from the purely mathematical to philosophy and political matters. In the following years, he took up the defense of human rights in general, and of women's and Blacks' rights in particular (an abolitionist, he became active in the Society of the Friends of the Blacks in the 1780s). He supported the ideals embodied by the newly formed United States, and proposed projects of political, administrative and economic reforms intended to transform France.

In 1776, Turgot was dismissed as Controller General. Consequently, Condorcet submitted his resignation as Inspector General of the Monnaie, but the request was refused, and he continued serving in this post until 1791. Condorcet later wrote Vie de M. Turgot (1786), a biography which spoke fondly of Turgot and advocated Turgot's economic theories. Condorcet continued to receive prestigious appointments: in 1777, he became Permanent Secretary of the Académie des Sciences, holding the post until the abolition of the Académie in 1793; and, in 1782, secretary of the Académie française. Thus, by the time his mentors had died Condorcet was the most institutionally powerful of the younger philosophes. Keith M. Baker writes, "During the last years of the Old Regime, Condorcet epitomized the links among science, enlightenment, and the cause of social reform."

== Election methods ==
In 1785, Condorcet published one of his most important works, Essay on the Application of Analysis to the Probability of Majority Decisions (Essai sur l'application de l'analyse à la probabilité des décisions rendues à la pluralité des voix). It described several now-famous results, including Condorcet's jury theorem, which states that if each member of a voting group is more likely than not to make a correct decision, the probability that the highest vote of the group is the correct decision increases as the number of members of the group increases, and Condorcet's paradox, which shows that majority preferences can become intransitive with three or more options – it is possible for a certain electorate to express a preference for A over B, a preference for B over C, and a preference for C over A, all from the same set of ballots.

The paper also outlines a generic Condorcet method, designed to simulate pair-wise elections between all candidates in an election. He disagreed strongly with the alternative method of aggregating preferences put forth by Jean-Charles de Borda (based on summed rankings of alternatives). Condorcet was one of the first to systematically apply mathematics in the social sciences.

He also considered the instant-runoff voting election system, as early as 1788, though only to condemn it, for its ability to eliminate a candidate preferred by most voters if they were compared one to one.

== Other works ==
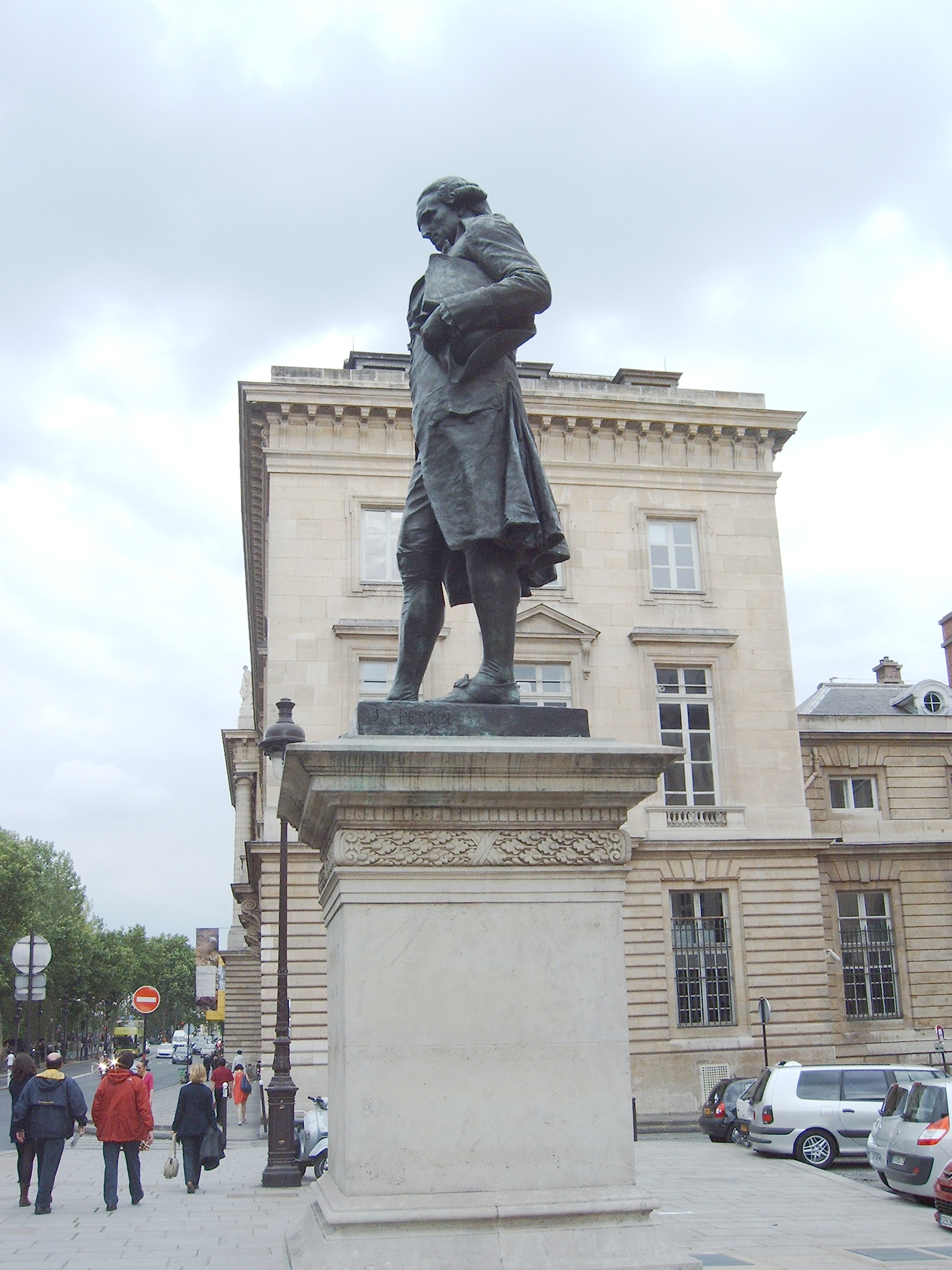
Condorcet's statue by Jacques Perrin (1847–1915), on the Quai de Conti in Paris, France

In 1781, Condorcet anonymously published a pamphlet entitled Reflections on Negro Slavery (Réflexions sur l'esclavage des nègres), in which he denounced slavery. In 1786, Condorcet worked on ideas for the differential and integral calculus, giving a new treatment of infinitesimals – a work which apparently was never published. In 1789, he published Vie de Voltaire (1789), which agreed with Voltaire in his opposition to the Church. In the same year he was elected as president of the Society of the Friends of the Blacks and lived in an apartment at Hôtel des Monnaies, Paris, across the Louvre. In 1791, Condorcet, along with his wife Sophie de Grouchy, Thomas Paine, Etienne Dumont, Jacques-Pierre Brissot, and Achilles Duchastellet published a brief journal titled Le Républicain, its main goal being the promotion of republicanism and the rejection of constitutional monarchy. The journal's theme was that any sort of monarchy is a threat to freedom no matter who is leading and that liberty is freedom from domination.

In 1791, Condorcet's Cinq mémoires sur l'instruction publique (Five memoirs on public instruction, 1791) was published. It has been called "the fullest of all Condorcet's statements of his conception of individual freedom in a complex modern society." In 1795, Condorcet's book Sketch for a Historical Picture of the Progress of the Human Mind was published after his death by his wife Sophie de Grouchy. It dealt with theoretical thought on perfecting the human mind and analyzing intellectual history based on social arithmetic. Thomas Malthus wrote An Essay on the Principle of Population (1798) partly in response to Condorcet's views on the "perfectibility of society."

== French Revolution ==
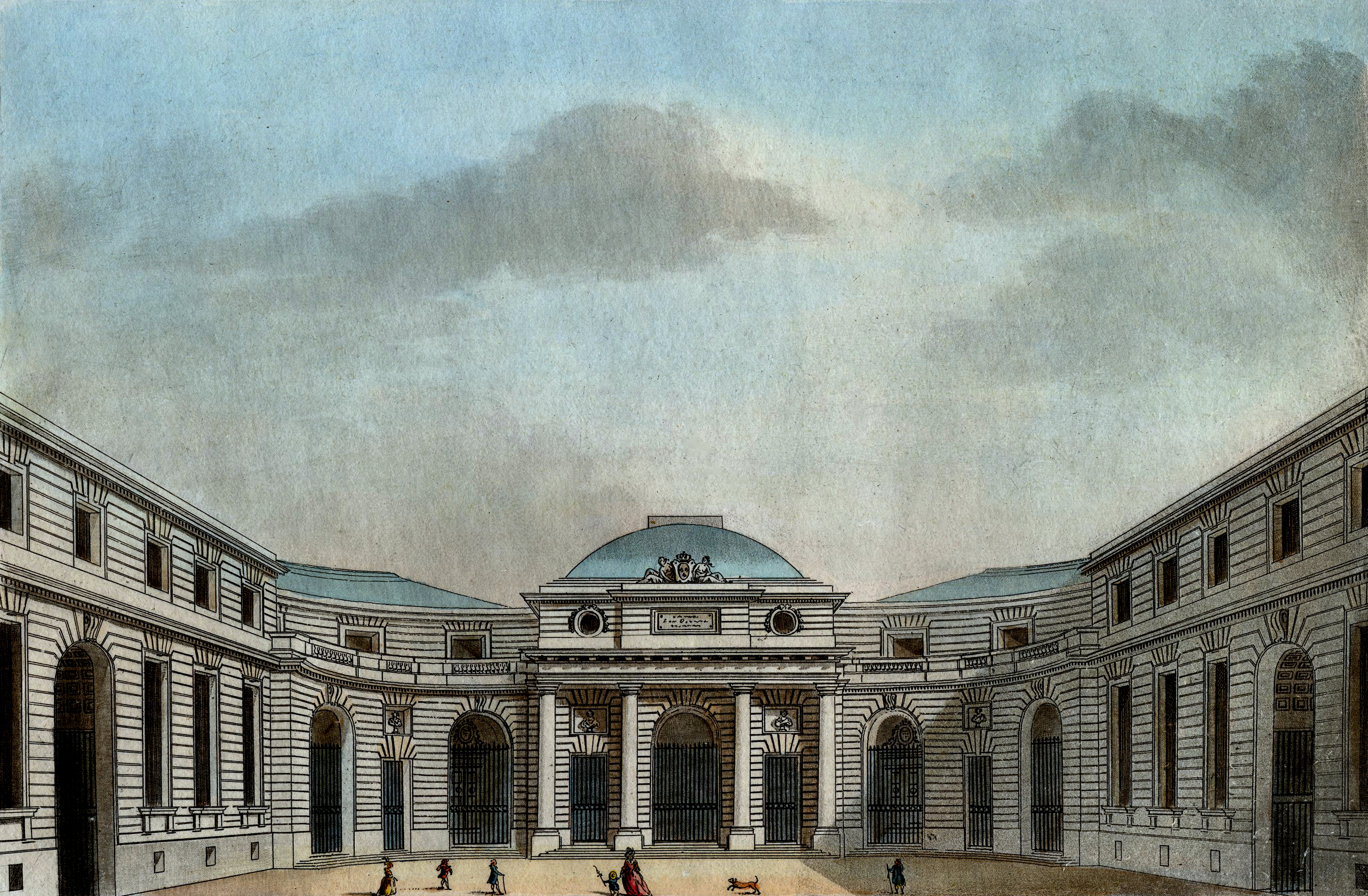
View of the Hôtel des Monnaies taken from the courtyard. Engraving by Jean-François Janinet.

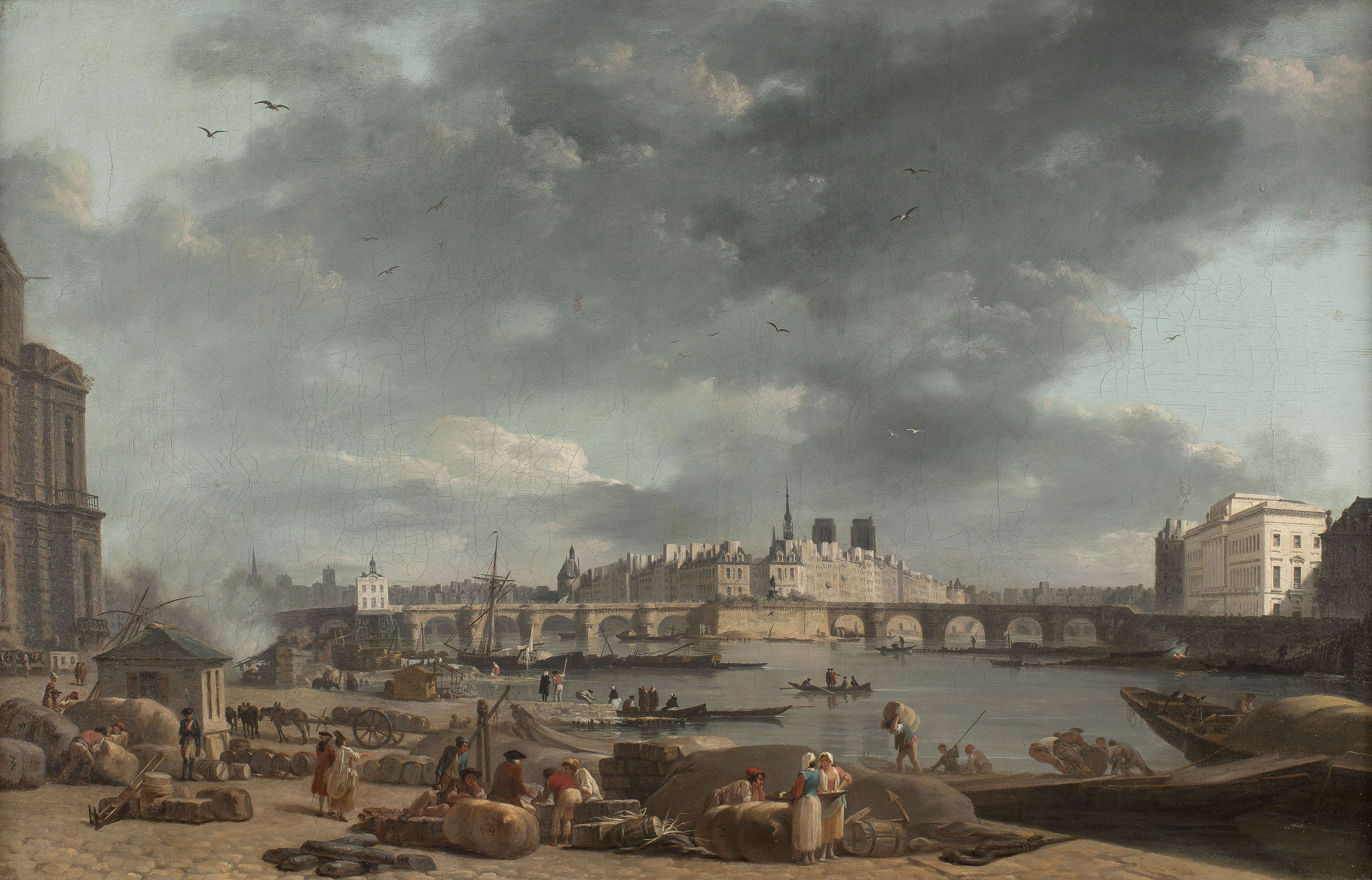
View of the Pont-Neuf and the Hôtel des Monnaies on the right

Condorcet took a leading role when the French Revolution swept France in 1789, hoping for a rationalist reconstruction of society, and championed many liberal causes. As a result, in 1791 he was elected as a Paris representative in the Legislative Assembly, and then became the secretary of the Assembly.

Condorcet was not affiliated with any political party but counted many friends among the Girondins. He distanced himself from them during the National Convention, however, due to his distaste for their factionalism.

In April 1792 Condorcet presented a project for the reformation of the education system, aiming to create a hierarchical system, under the authority of experts, who would work as the guardians of the Enlightenment and who, independent of power, would be the guarantors of public liberties. The project was judged to be contrary to republican and egalitarian virtues, handing the education of the Nation over to an aristocracy of savants, and Condorcet's proposal was not taken up by the Assembly. Several years later, in 1795, when the Thermidorians had gained in strength, the National Convention would adopt an educational plan based on Condorcet's proposal.

He advocated women's suffrage for the new government, writing an article for Journal de la Société de 1789, and by publishing De l'admission des femmes au droit de cité (For the admission to the rights of citizenship for women) in 1790.

At the trial of Louis XVI in December 1792, Condorcet, who opposed the death penalty albeit supporting the trial itself, spoke out against the execution of the King during the public vote at the Convention – he proposed to send the king to work as a slave rower on galley ships.

Condorcet was on the Constitution Committee and was the main author of the Girondin constitutional project. This constitution was not put to a vote. When the Montagnards gained control of the convention, they wrote their own, the French Constitution of 1793. Condorcet criticized the new work, and as a result, he was branded a traitor. On 3 October 1793, a warrant was issued for Condorcet's arrest.

== Arrest and death ==
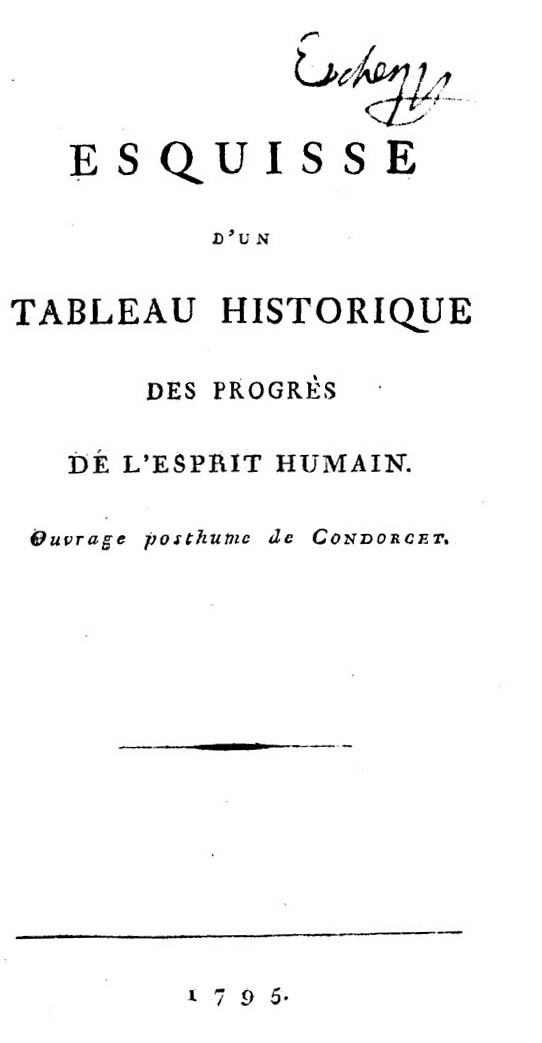
The most famous work by de Condorcet, Esquisse d'un tableau historique des progrès de l'esprit humain, 1795. With this posthumous book the development of the Age of Enlightenment is considered generally ended.

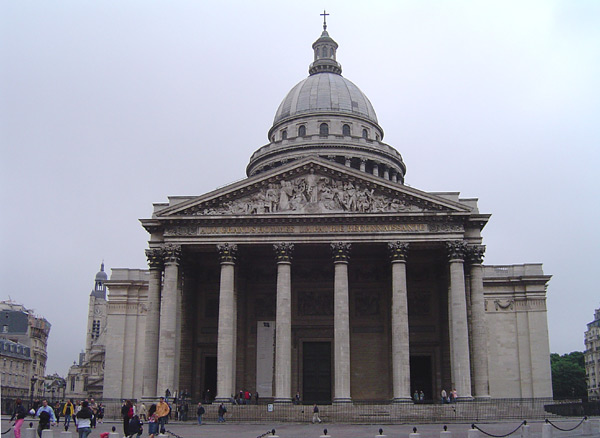
Condorcet was symbolically interred in the Panthéon (pictured) in 1989.

The warrant forced Condorcet into hiding. He hid for some months in the house of Mme. Vernet in Paris, where he wrote Esquisse d'un tableau historique des progrès de l'esprit humain (Sketch for a Historical Picture of the Progress of the Human Mind), which was published posthumously in 1795 and is considered one of the major texts of the Enlightenment and of historical thought. It narrates the history of civilization as one of progress in the sciences, claims an intimate connection between scientific progress and the development of human rights and justice, and outlines the features of a future rational society entirely shaped by scientific knowledge.

On 25 March 1794 Condorcet, convinced he was no longer safe, left his hideout and attempted to flee Paris. He went to seek refuge at the house of Jean-Baptiste Suard, a friend of his with whom he had resided in 1772, but he was refused on the basis that he would be betrayed by one of their residents. Two days later, he was arrested in Clamart and imprisoned in Bourg-la-Reine (or, as it was known during the Revolution, Bourg-l'Égalité, "Equality Borough" rather than "Queen's Borough") where, after another two days, he was found dead in his cell. The most widely accepted theory is that his friend Pierre Jean George Cabanis gave him a poison which he eventually used. However, some historians believe that he may have been murdered (perhaps because he was too loved and respected to be executed).Jean-Pierre Brancourt (in his work L'élite, la mort et la révolution) claims that Condorcet was killed with a mixture of Datura stramonium and opium.

In 1989 Condorcet's body was interred in Paris's Panthéon to commemorate the bicentennial of the French Revolution and his role as a leading figure of the Enlightenment. The casket placed in the crypt was empty as his remains, originally buried in a common grave in the Bourg-la-Reine cemetery had been lost in the 19th century.

== Family ==
In 1786 Condorcet married Sophie de Grouchy, who was more than twenty years his junior. Sophie, reckoned one of the most beautiful women of the day, became an accomplished salon hostess as Madame de Condorcet, and also an accomplished translator of Thomas Paine and Adam Smith. She was intelligent and well educated, fluent in both English and Italian. The marriage was a strong one, and Sophie visited her husband regularly while he remained in hiding. Although she began proceedings for divorce in January 1794, it was at the insistence of Condorcet and Cabanis, who wished to protect their property from expropriation and to provide financially for Sophie and their young daughter, Louise 'Eliza' Alexandrine.

During his time in hiding, Condorcet penned a poignant letter to his daughter, offering his advice and wisdom to her as she grows to become an adult. The letter embodies his egalitarian vision of the rights and opportunities for women in society.

Condorcet was survived by his widow and four-year-old Eliza. Sophie died in 1822, never having remarried, and having published all her husband's works between 1801 and 1804. Her work was carried on by Eliza, wife of former United Irishman Arthur O'Connor. The Condorcet-O'Connors published a revised edition between 1847 and 1849.

== Gender equality ==
Condorcet's work also focused on a quest for a more egalitarian society. This path led him to think and write about gender equality in the Revolutionary context. In 1790, he published "Sur l'admission des femmes au droit de cité" ("On the Admission of Women to the Rights of Citizenship") in which he strongly advocated for women's position as active citizens in the new French Republic. He became one of the most famous Enlightenment thinkers due to his premature ideals and radical proposals that challenged the status quo of the time.

Condorcet's whole plea for gender equality is founded on the belief that the attribution of rights comes from false assumptions. In his political essay, "On the admission of the Rights of Women to Citizenship" his main argument relies on women's equal capacity to reason. He even goes on to argue that women possess their own form of reason that is different from their male compatriots but by no means lesser as it is an artificial rather than natural difference: "There is more truth in this observation, but it still proves nothing since this difference is caused, not by nature, but by education and society..."

'The rights of men stem exclusively from the fact that they are sentient beings, capable of acquiring moral ideas and of reasoning upon them. Since women have the same qualities, they necessarily also have the same rights. Either no member of the human race has any true rights, or else they all have the same ones; and anyone who votes against the rights of another, whatever his religion, colour or sex, automatically forfeits his own.'

Similarly, Condorcet identified education as crucial to the emancipation of individuals. He refused to acquit the inequality between men and women to natural disposition. Instead, he believed that the provision of education to women on par with the education provided to men was the pathway to establishing gender equality. He stated: "I believe that all other differences between men and women are simply the result of education".

His views on rights that must be afforded to women were not limited to education and citizenship but also social freedoms and protections that included the right for women to plan their own pregnancies, provision of access to birth control, and men's obligation to take responsibility for the welfare of children they have fathered, both legitimate and illegitimate and women's right to seek divorce. He also advocated for the criminalization of rape, declaring that it "violates the property which everyone has in her person".

Condorcet's impact on gender equality seems to be limited to his progressive scholarship. Even though The Marquis had the chance to translate his ideals into a drafted constitution, he made limited efforts to push these issues on the drafting agenda. Some scholars on the other hand, believe that this lack of action is not due to the weakness of his commitment but rather to the political atmosphere at the time and the absence of political appetite for gender equality on the part of decision-makers. Along with authors such as Mary Wollstonecraft, d'Alembert or Olympe de Gouges, Condorcet made a lasting contribution to the pre-feminist debate. Barbara Brookes in her essay published in 1980 "The Feminism of Condorcet and Sophie de Grouchy" examines the influence of Condorcet essay's "On The Admission to Women to the Rights of Citizenship" stating that he vigorously rebutted the arguments of anti-feminists and was a major contribution to French feminism during the revolution.

== The idea of progress ==
Condorcet's Sketch for a Historical Picture of the Progress of the Human Mind (1795) was perhaps the most influential formulation of the idea of progress ever written. It made the idea of progress a central concern of Enlightenment thought. He argued that expanding knowledge in the natural and social sciences would lead to an ever more just world of individual freedom, material affluence, and moral compassion. He argued for three general propositions: that the past revealed an order that could be understood in terms of the progressive development of human capabilities, showing that humanity's "present state, and those through which it has passed, are a necessary constitution of the moral composition of humankind"; that the progress of the natural sciences must be followed by progress in the moral and political sciences "no less certain, no less secure from political revolutions"; that social evils are the result of ignorance and error rather than an inevitable consequence of human nature. He was innovative in suggesting that scientific medicine might in the future significantly extend the human life span, perhaps even indefinitely, such that future humans only die of accident, murder and suicide rather than simply old age or disease. Nick Bostrom has thus described him as an early transhumanist.

Condorcet's writings were a key contribution to the French Enlightenment, particularly his work on the idea of progress. Condorcet believed that through the use of our senses and communication with others, knowledge could be compared and contrasted as a way of analyzing our systems of belief and understanding. None of Condorcet's writings refer to a belief in a religion or a god who intervenes in human affairs. Condorcet instead frequently had written of his faith in humanity itself and its ability to progress with the help of philosophers such as Aristotle. Through this accumulation and sharing of knowledge he believed it was possible for anybody to comprehend all the known facts of the natural world. The enlightenment of the natural world spurred the desire for enlightenment of the social and political world. Condorcet believed that there was no definition of the perfect human existence and thus believed that the progression of the human race would inevitably continue throughout the course of our existence. He envisioned man as continually progressing toward a perfectly utopian society. He believed in the great potential towards growth that man possessed.

However, Condorcet stressed that for this to be a possibility man must unify regardless of race, religion, culture or gender. To this end, he became a member of the French Société des Amis des Noirs (Society of the Friends of the Blacks). He wrote a set of rules for the Society of the Friends of the Blacks which detailed the reasoning and goals behind the organization along with describing the injustice of slavery and put in a statement calling for the abolition of the slave trade as the first step to true abolition. Although Condorcet was one of the most determined to advocate for the end of slavery, his strong position in favor of abolitionism can be nuanced. In a recent scholarly article published in 2025, Sandrine Bergès develops an argument that she called "the childhood argument" to reevaluate the position of Condorcet on the abolition of slavery. Indeed, she provides explanations to demonstrate that while Condorcet morally condemned slavery and waned it to be ended, he was still holding paternalist views about enslaved people. He considered them as not being able to exercise liberty by their own will. Therefore, granting them full autonomy would be irresponsible considering their late development. His abolitionist position was thus perpetuating a racial hierarchy between individuals that would have different capacities and deserve to be treatment differently. While in favor of a gradual abolition for enslaved people, Condorcet was concerned by maintaining the white supremacy that he viewed as superior.

Condorcet was also a strong proponent of women's civil rights. He claimed that women were equal to men in nearly every aspect and asked why then should they be debarred from their fundamental civil rights; the few differences that existed were due to the fact that women were limited by their lack of rights. Condorcet even mentioned several women who were more capable than average men, such as Queen Elizabeth and Maria Theresa. Indeed, as stated by David Williams, in his essay "Condorcet, Feminism, and the Egalitarian Principle", published in 1976: "Falling back on the example of history, like all good children of the Enlightenment, Condorcet pointed to the gifts of Elizabeth I, Maria Theresa, and the two Catherines, who all proved that the necessary qualities of leadership and political courage were not lacking in those women who were able, through the accident of birth, to wield power."

Furthermore, as he argues for the civil, political, and educational rights of women, Condorcet boldly challenges that unless women's natural inferiority to men could be proven, the denial of the aforementioned rights is an "act of tyranny" constituted by the newly formed French nation.

About Islam and China he wrote: "the religion of Mohammed, the simplest in its dogmas, the least absurd in its practices, the most tolerant in its principles, seems to condemn to eternal slavery, to incurable stupidity, this entire vast portion of the Earth where it has extended its empire; while we will see the genius of science and freedom shine beneath the most absurd superstitions, in the midst of the most barbaric intolerance. China offers us the same phenomenon, although the effects of this stupefying poison have been less fatal."

== Civic duty ==
For Condorcet's republicanism the nation needed enlightened citizens and education needed democracy to become truly public. Democracy implied free citizens, and ignorance was the source of servitude. Citizens had to be provided with the necessary knowledge to exercise their freedom and understand the rights and laws that guaranteed their enjoyment. Although education could not eliminate disparities in talent, all citizens, including women, had the right to free education. In opposition to those who relied on revolutionary enthusiasm to form the new citizens, Condorcet maintained that revolution was not made to last and that revolutionary institutions were not intended to prolong the revolutionary experience but to establish political rules and legal mechanisms that would insure future changes without revolution. In a democratic city there would be no Bastille to be seized. Public education would form free and responsible citizens, not revolutionaries.

== Evaluation ==
Rothschild (2001) argues that Condorcet has been seen since the 1790s as the embodiment of the cold, rational Enlightenment. However she suggests his writings on economic policy, voting, and public instruction indicate different views both of Condorcet and of the Enlightenment. Condorcet was concerned with individual diversity; he was opposed to proto-utilitarian theories; he considered individual independence, which he described as the characteristic liberty of the moderns, to be of central political importance; and he opposed the imposition of universal and eternal principles. His efforts to reconcile the universality of some values with the diversity of individual opinions are of continuing interest. He emphasizes the institutions of civilized or constitutional conflict, recognizes conflicts or inconsistencies within individuals, and sees moral sentiments as the foundation of universal values. His difficulties call into question some familiar distinctions, for example between French, German, and English-Scottish thought, and between the Enlightenment and the counter-Enlightenment. There was substantial continuity between Condorcet's criticism of the economic ideas of the 1760s and the liberal thought of the early 19th century.

The Lycée Condorcet in the rue du Havre, in the 9th arrondissement of Paris, is named in his honour, as are streets in many French cities.

== Publications ==
- Essai sur le calcul intégral, 1765
- Rapport sur le choix d'une unité de mesure, lu à l'Academie des sciences le 19 mars 1791 / imprimé par ordre de l'Assemblée nationale. With Jean-Charles de Borda.
- Du probleme des trois corps (in French). Paris: François Ambroise Didot. 1787.
- Lettres d'un théologien à l'auteur du Dictionnaire des trois siècles, 1774
- Réflexions sur l'esclavage des nègres, 1781. Under the pseudonym M. Schwartz
- Mémoire sur le calcul des probabilités, in Mémoires de l'Académie royale des sciences. 1781–1784
- Éloge de M. d'Alembert, lu dans l'Assemblée publique de l'Académie des sciences, le 21 Avril 1784. A Paris: chez Moutard, 1784
- Essai sur l'application de l'analyse à la probabilité des décisions rendus à la pluralité des voix. Paris: Royale, 1785
- De l'influence de la révolution d'Amérique sur l'Europe. 1786
- Vie de Monsieur Turgot. Londres, 1786
- Réflexions d'un citoyen, sur la révolution de 1788. Londres, 1788
- Sur le choix des ministres, 1789
- Au corps électoral sur Esclavage des Noirs. 1789
- Déclaration des droits. 1789
- Sur l'admission des femmes au droit de cité. 1790
- Réflexions sur la révolution de 1688, et sur celle du 10 août 1792, 1792
- Adresse aux Bataves, 1792
- Vie de Voltaire. Paris : Renouard, 1822. Contains also: Mémoires pour servir à la vie de M. de Voltaire / écrits par lui-m^eme. Commentaire historique sur les œuvres de l'auteur de la Henriade. Choix de pièces justificatives pour La vie de Voltaire
- Correspondance inédite de Condorcet et de Turgot: 1770–1779. Paris: Charavay Frères, 1883
- Esquisse d'un tableau historique des progres de l'esprit humain (in French). [Paris?]: [s.n.] 1795.
- Œuvres complètes, Paris, 1804. 21 delen
  - Tome premier. Eloges des académiciens de l'Académie Royale de Sciences, morts depuis l'an 1666, jusqu'en 1699
  - Tome II: Mélanges de littérature et de philosophie Tome II. Éloges des académiciens de l'Académie Royale de Sciences, morts depuis l'an 1771
  - Tome III: Mélanges de littérature et de philosophie tome III. Éloges des académiciens de l'Académie Royale de Sciences, morts depuis l'an 1783
  - Tome IV: Mélanges de littérature et de philosophie. Eloges des académiciens de l'Académie Royale de Sciences, morts depuis l'an 1787; suivvis de cuex de Michel de l'hôpital et de Blaise Pascal
  - Tome V: Vie de M. Turgot, publiée en 1786
  - Tome VI: Mélanges de littérature et de philosophie. Vie de Voltaire, suivi des advertissements et notes ...
  - Tome septième: Economie politique et politique tome I. Réflexions sur la jurisprudence criminelle. 1775. 1847
  - Tome VIII: Mélanges de littérature et de philosophie. Exquisse d'un tableau historique des progrès de l'esprit humaine. Premiere partie
  - Tome IX: Mélanges de littérature et de philosophie Tome IX. Sur l'instruction publique
  - Tome X: Mélanges de littérature et de philosophie Tome X. Lettres d'un théologien a l'auteur des trois siècles
  - Tome XI: Mélanges de politique tome XI. Réflexions sur la jurisprudence criminelle
  - Tome XII: Lettres d'un bourgeois de New-Heaven a un citoyen de Virginie ...
  - Tome XIII: Melanges de politique. Sur les assemblées provinciales. Première partie
  - Tome XIV: Melanges de politique. Sur les assemblées provinciales. Seconde partie
  - Tome XVI: Fragment sur la liberté de la presse
  - Tome XVII: Mélanges de politique tome XVII. De l'influence d'un monarque et d'une cour . Sur les moers d'un peuple libre
  - Tome XVIII: Sur le sens du mot révolutionnaire
  - Tome XIX: Lettre d'un laboureur de Picardie, A.M.N.***
  - Tome XX: Mélanges d'economie politique Tome XX. Plan d'un emprunt publique, avec des hypothèques spéciales
  - Tome XXI: Sur les caisses d'accumulation
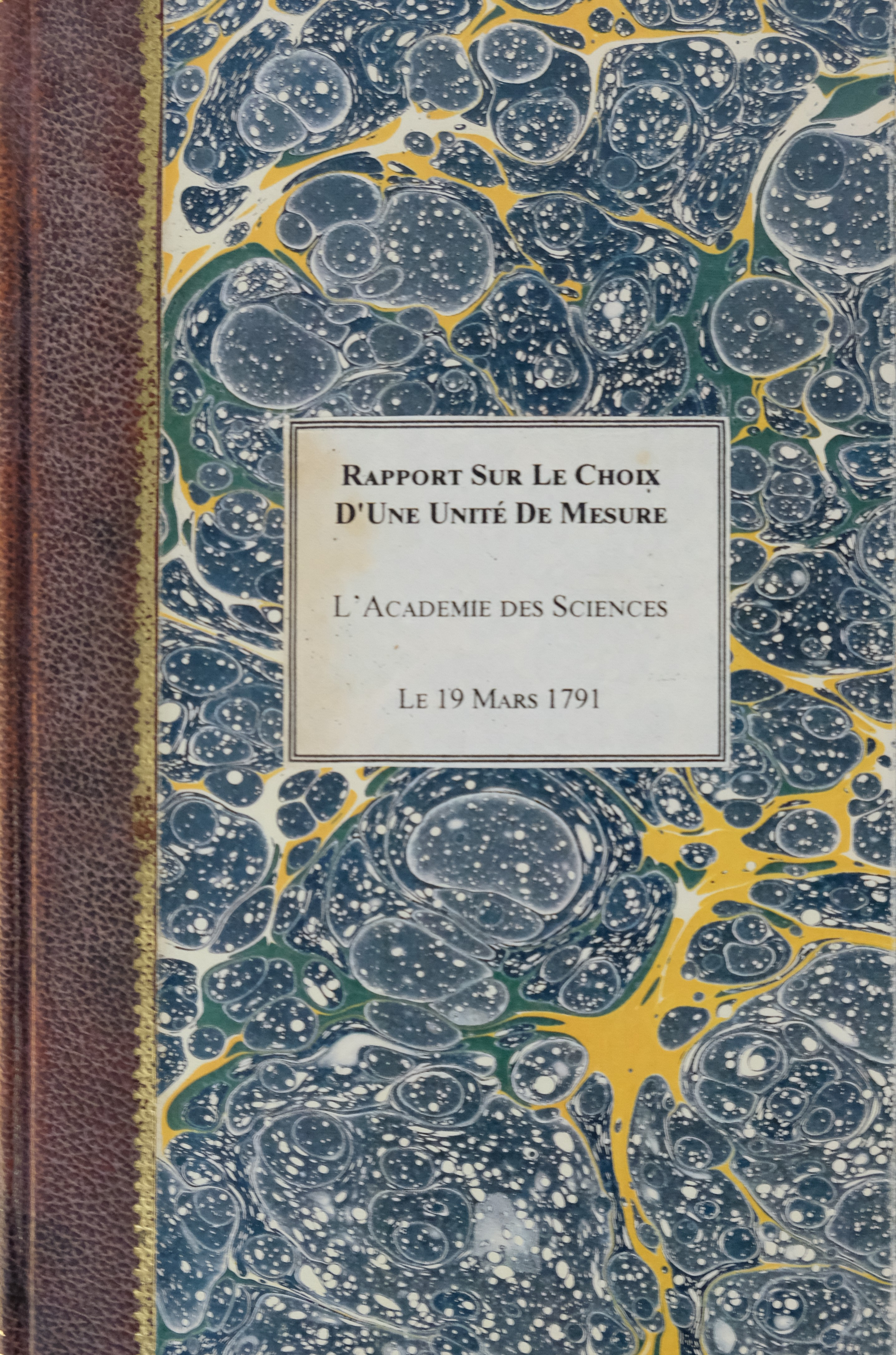
Cover page of a 1791 copy of "Rapport sur le choix d'une unité de mesure" by Condorcet and Jean-Charles de Borda

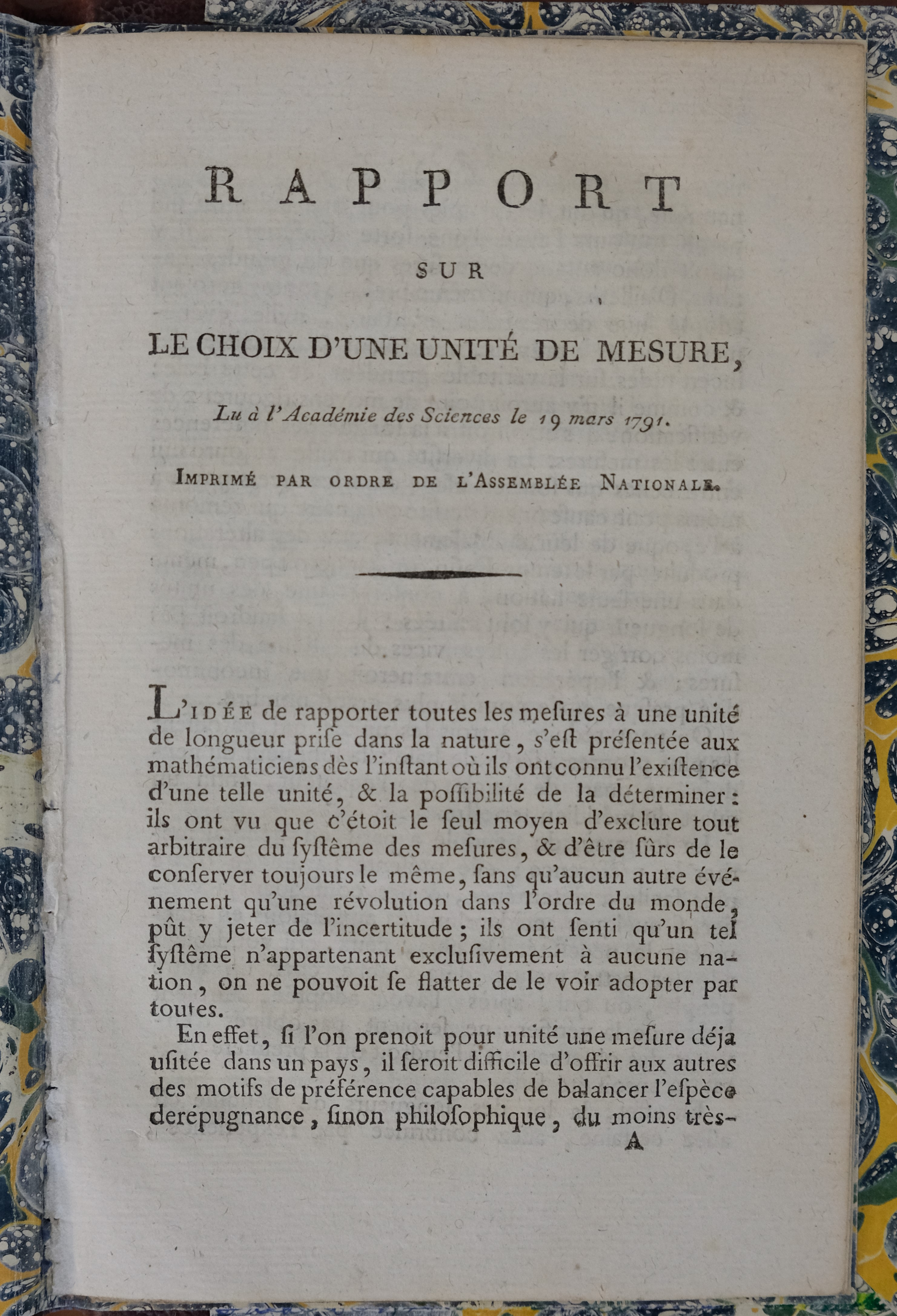
Page one of a 1791 copy of "Rapport sur le choix d'une unité de mesure" by Condorcet and Jean-Charles de Borda

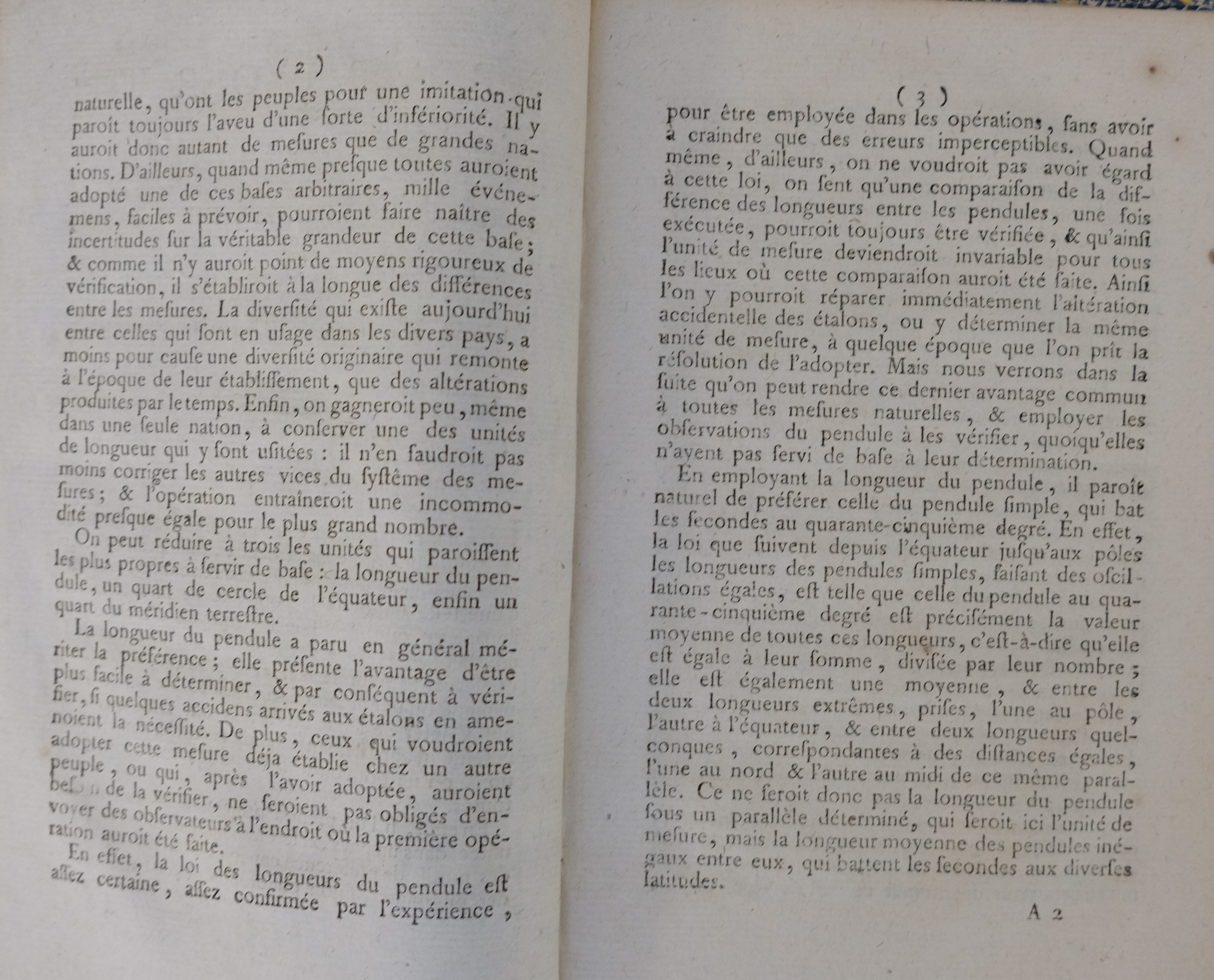
Pages 2–3

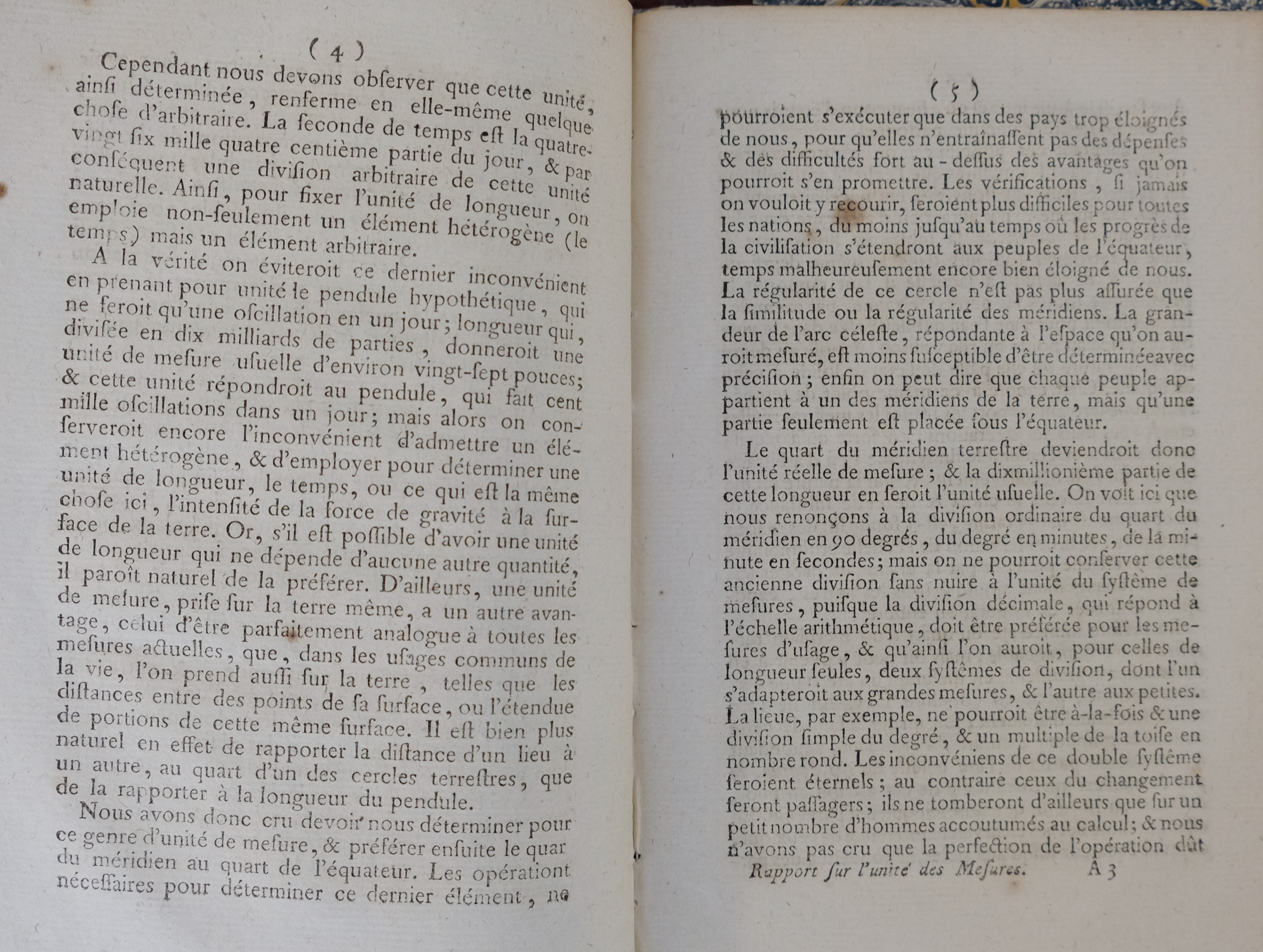
Pages 4–5

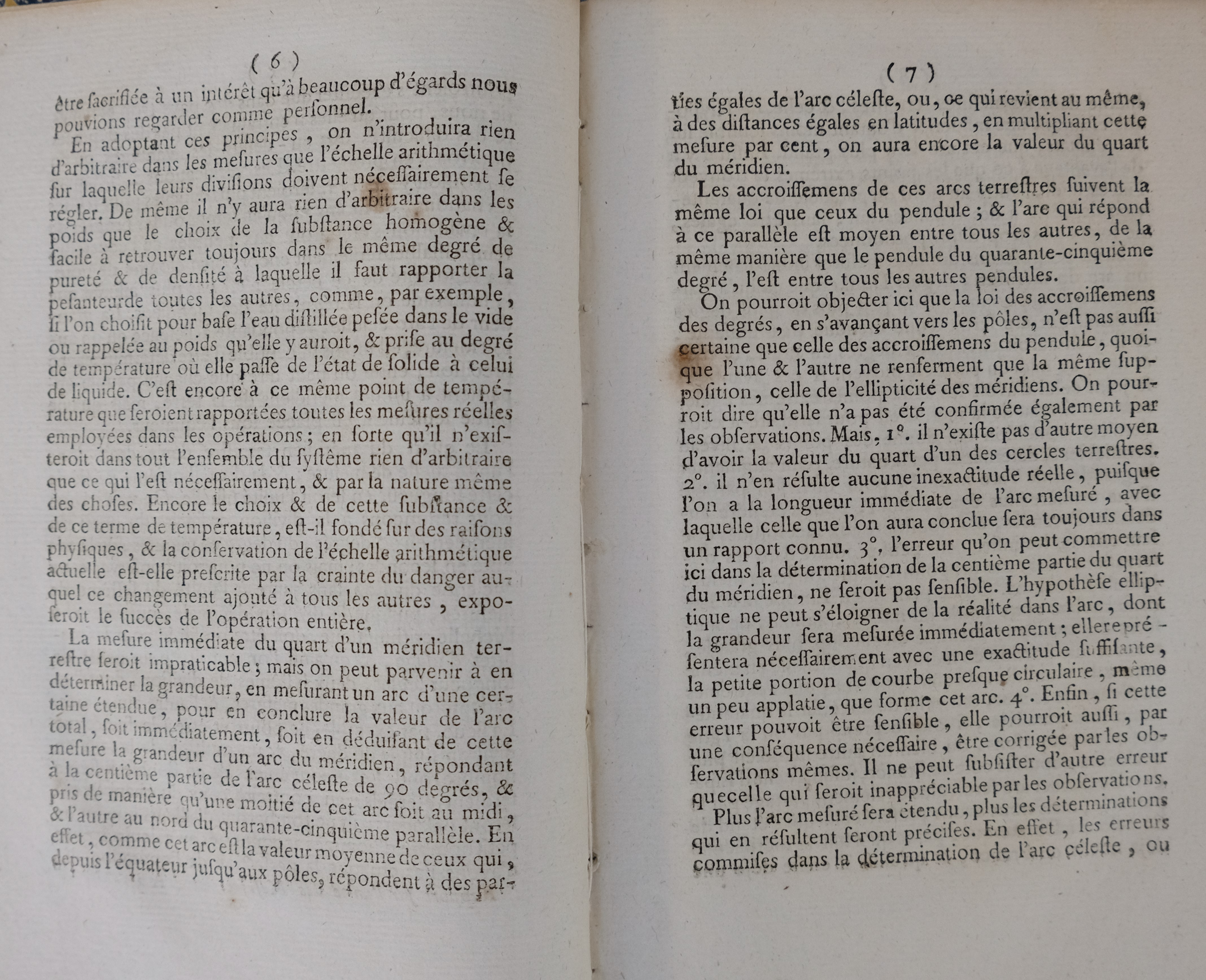
Pages 6–7

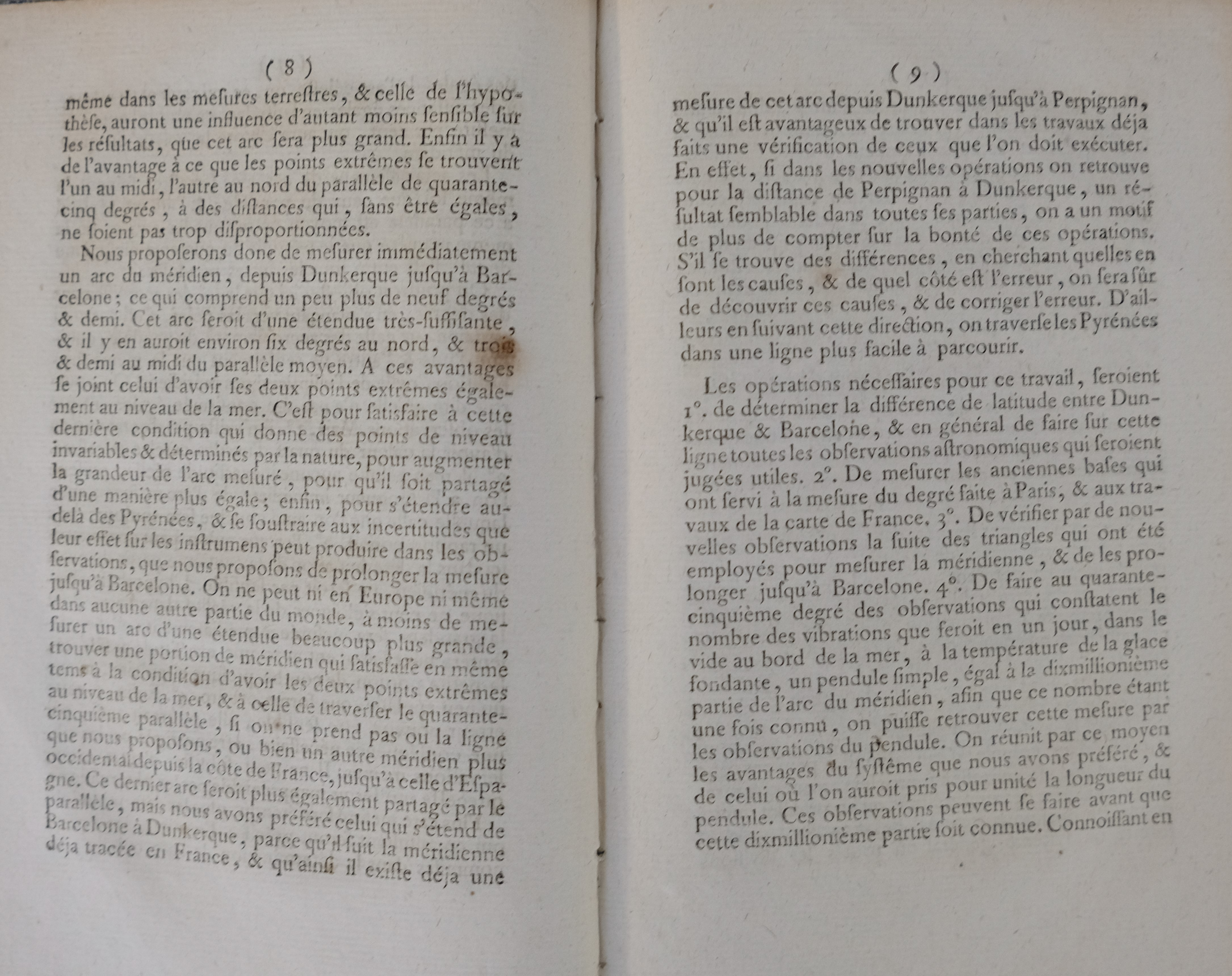
Pages 8–9

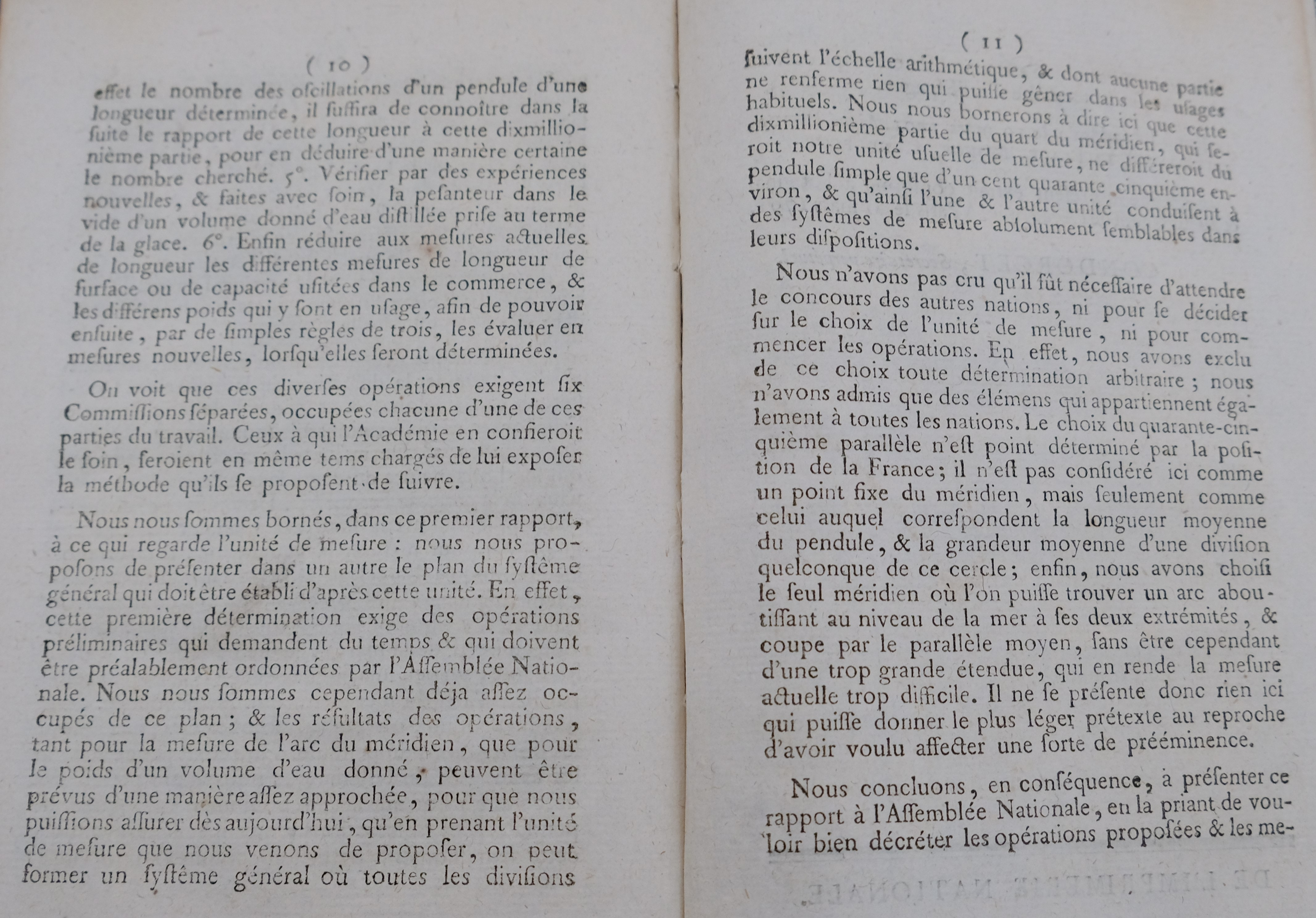
Pages 10–11

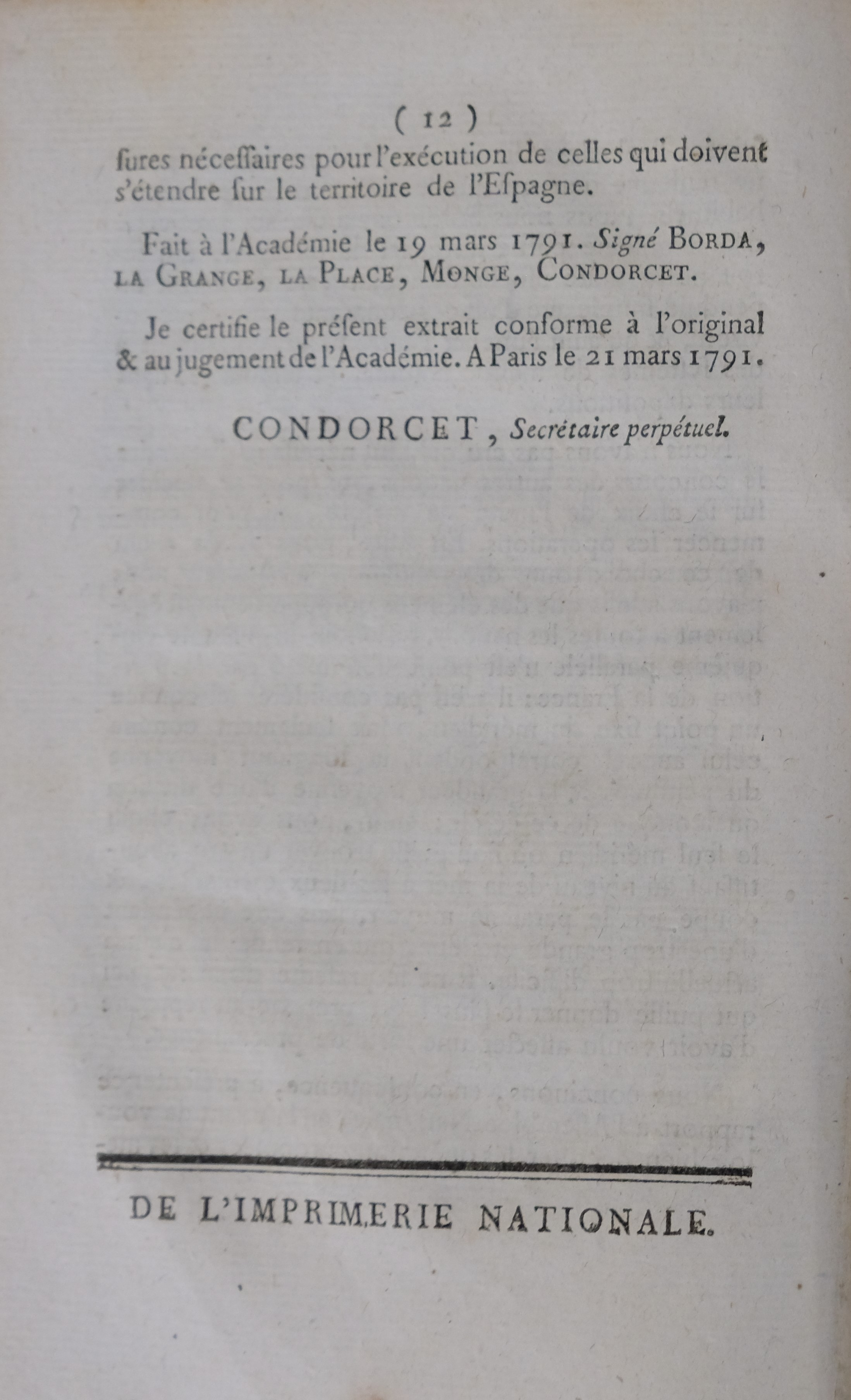
Final page of a 1791 copy of "Rapport sur le choix d'une unité de mesure" by Condorcet and Jean-Charles de Borda

== Bibliography ==
- Steven Lukes, Nadia Urbinati, ed. (2012). Condorcet: Political Writings. New York: Cambridge University Press (Cambridge Texts in the History of Political Thought). ISBN 978-1107021013.

== Fictional portrayals ==
=== Novels ===
- City of Darkness, City of Light by Marge Piercy

=== Short stories ===
- "The Philosopher" in Ribbons of Scarlet by Kate Quinn, Stephanie Dray, Laura Kamoie, Sophie Perinot, Heather Webb, and E. Knight

=== Movies ===
- Flashback (2021 film)

== See also ==
- History of the metre
- Seconds pendulum
- Society of the Friends of Truth
