= Golden Cities, Far =

1970 anthology edited by Lin Carter

- Cover of the first edition.
- Author: Edited by Lin Carter
- Cover artist: Ralph Iwamoto and Kathleen Zimmerman
- Language: English
- Series: Ballantine Adult Fantasy series
- Genre: Fantasy
- Publisher: Ballantine Books
- Publication date: 1970
- Publication place: United States
- Media type: Print (paperback)
- Pages: 299 pp
- Preceded by: The Young Magicians
- Followed by: New Worlds for Old

Golden Cities, Far is an anthology of fantasy short stories, edited by American writer Lin Carter. It was first published in paperback by Ballantine Books in October 1970 as the twenty-second volume of its Ballantine Adult Fantasy series. It was the third such anthology assembled by Carter for the series.

== Summary ==
The book collects twelve fantasy tales and poems by various authors, with an overall introduction and notes by Carter. Most of the pieces are ancient or medieval in date, and none later than the nineteenth century. The anthology is a companion volume to Carter's earlier Dragons, Elves, and Heroes (1969), which also collects early fantasies.

== Contents ==
- "Introduction" by Lin Carter
- "How Nefer-ka-ptah Found The Book of Thoth"
  - from the Egyptian Papyri, retold by Brian Brown
- "The Descent of Ishtar to the Netherworld"
  - from the Sumerian Epic Angalta Kigalshe in a new version by Lin Carter
- "Prince Ahmed and the Fairy Paribanou"
  - from Galland's Les Mille et Une Nuit in an old English version
- "The Talisman of Oromanes"
  - from the mock-Persian The Tales of the Genii, supposedly translated by Sir Charles Morell
- "Wars of the Giants of Albion"
  - from the Welsh Historia Regum Britanniae by Geoffrey of Monmouth, in a new version by Wayland Smith
- "Forty Singing Seamen"
  - a modern English ballad on an old legend by Alfred Noyes
- "The Shadowy Lord of Mommur"
  - from the French romance Huon of Bordeaux, translated by Sir John Bourchier, retold by Robert Steele
- "Olivier's Brag"
  - a modern treatment of a Carolingian legend by Anatole France, translated by Alfred Allinson
- "The White Bull"
  - from the romances of Voltaire
- "The Yellow Dwarf"
  - from the French Contes Nouvelles ou les Fees, by Madame d'Aulnoy
- "Arcalaus the Enchanter" and "The Isle of Wonders"
  - from the Portuguese Amadis of Gaul, translated by Robert Southey
- "The Palace of Illusions"
  - from Orlando Furioso by Ludovico Ariosto, translated by Richard Hodgens
