= The Tales of the Genii =

1764 collection by English author James Ridley

- Title page of the third edition.
- Author: "Sir Charles Morell" (James Ridley)
- Language: English
- Genre: Fantasy
- Publication date: 1764
- Publication place: United Kingdom
- Media type: Print (hardcover)
- Pages: 2 vols.

The Tales of the Genii: or, the Delightful Lessons of Horam, The Son of Asmar is a collection by the English author James Ridley, consisting of Oriental pastiche fantasy tales modeled on those of the Arabian Nights. The work was originally passed off as an authentic work by a Persian imam named Horam translated into English by "Sir Charles Morell, formerly ambassador from the British Settlements in India to the Great Mogul" and published by an anonymous "editor." It is the work for which Ridley is chiefly remembered.

The work was first issued in shilling parts, with the full work published in two volumes in London in 1764. Further editions appeared in 1780, 1794, 1800, 1805, 1814, 1849, and 1861, the last two selected, revised, "purified and remodelled" by Archbishop Whately "with a view of developing a religious moral." Whately's reworking has been judged "far inferior." The book was translated into German in 1765-66, and French in 1766.

== Summary ==
The book consists of a dedicatory statement and an introductory note, both by an anonymous editor, a fictitious biography of its supposed author by the supposed translator, and the nine tales of the work itself, most of them subdivided into several parts. The editor, author and translator are all fictitious personae of the actual author.

== Contents ==
=== Volume I. ===
- To His Royal Highness George, Prince of Wales.
- The Editor to the Reader.
- The Life of Horam, the Son of Asmar. Written by Sir Charles Morell.
- The History of the Merchant Abudah; or, The Talisman of Oromanes. Tale the First.
  - The Merchant Abudah's Adventure in the Valley of Bocchim.
  - The Second Adventure of the Merchant Abudah in the Groves of Shadaski.
  - The Merchant Abudah's Third Adventure in the Kingdom of Tasgi.
  - The Merchant Abudah's Fourth Adventure Among the Sages of Nema.
- The Dervise Alfouran. Tale the Second.
  - The Continuation of the Tale of the Dervise Alfouran.
- Hassan Assar, or the History of the Caliph of Bagdat. Tale the Third.
- Kelaun and Guzzarat. Tale the Fourth.
  - The Continuation of the Tale of Kelaun and Guzzarat.
- The Adventures of Urad; or the Fair Wanderer. Tale the Fifth.
- The Inchanters; or Mishnar, the Sultan of India. Tale the Sixth.
  - The Continuation of the Tale of the Inchanters; or Mishnar, the Sultan of the East.
  - The History of Mahoud.
  - The Continuation of the Tale of the Inchanters; or Mishnar, the Sultan of the East.

=== Volume II. ===
  - The Continuation of the Tale of the Inchanters; or Misnar, the Sultan of the East.
- The History of the Princess of Cassimir. Tale the Seventh.
  - The Continuation of the Tale of the Princess of Cassimir.
- Sadak and Kalasrade. Tale the Eighth.
  - The Continuation of the Tale of Sadak and Kalasrade.
  - The Continuation of the Tale of Sadak and Kalasrade.
- Mirglip, the Persian; or, Fincal, the Dervise of the Groves. Tale the Ninth.
  - The Continuation of the Tale of Mirglip, the Persian; or, Fincal, the Dervise of the Groves.

== Reception ==
In his own time and after, Ridley's book was popular, and was compared to Samuel Johnson's Rasselas. Thomas Seccombe calls "the stories ... good in themselves; they are interspersed with some satire upon the professions of so-called Christians; and, for the rest, are skilfully modelled upon the 'Arabian Nights'."

== Influence ==
John Beer, in the introduction to the 1975 Everyman edition of Samuel Taylor Coleridge's Poems (p. vi), notes the influence of several of Ridley's tales on Kubla Khan.

John Martin's painting Sadak in Search of the Waters of Oblivion (1812) is based on the eighth tale.

Seccombe notes of Ridley's tales that "[t]heir popularity among children outlasted the eighteenth century," as attested by Misnar, a juvenile play written by Charles Dickens based on the sixth tale about 1822.

As late as 1970 editor Lin Carter included the first tale in his pioneering anthology of classic fantasy Golden Cities, Far, twenty-second volume in the Ballantine Adult Fantasy series.
