= The Young Magicians =

1969 anthology edited by Lin Carter

- Editor: Lin Carter
- Cover artist: Sheryl Slavitt
- Language: English
- Series: Ballantine Adult Fantasy series
- Genre: Fantasy
- Publisher: Ballantine Books
- Publication date: 1969
- Publication place: United States
- Media type: Print (Paperback)
- Pages: 280
- Preceded by: Dragons, Elves, and Heroes
- Followed by: Golden Cities, Far

The Young Magicians is an American anthology of fantasy short stories, edited by American writer Lin Carter. It was first published in paperback by Ballantine Books in October 1969 as the seventh volume of its Ballantine Adult Fantasy series. It was the second such anthology assembled by Carter for the series, issued simultaneously with the first, Dragons, Elves, and Heroes. The book has been translated into German.

== Summary ==
The book collects eighteen modern fantasy tales and poems by various authors, with an overall introduction and notes by Carter. The pieces range in date from the 19th to 20th centuries. The collection is a companion volume to Carter's later New Worlds for Old (1971), which also collects modern fantasies.

== Contents ==
- "Introduction: Diana's Foresters" (Lin Carter)
- "Rapunzel" (William Morris)
- "The Sword of Welleran" (Lord Dunsany)
- "In Valhalla" (E. R. Eddison)
- "The Way of Ecben" (James Branch Cabell)
- "The Quest of Iranon" (H. P. Lovecraft)
- "The Cats of Ulthar" (H. P. Lovecraft)
- "The Maze of Maal Dweb" (Clark Ashton Smith)
- "The Whelming of Oom" (Lin Carter) (A Lord Dunsany pastiche).
- "Through the Dragon Glass" (A. Merritt)
- "The Valley of the Worm" (Robert E. Howard)
- "Heldendämmerung" (poem) (L. Sprague de Camp)
- "Cursed be the City" (Henry Kuttner)
- "Ka the Appalling" (L. Sprague de Camp)
- "Turjan of Miir" (Jack Vance)
- "Narnian Suite" (poem) (C.S. Lewis)
- "Once Upon a Time" (poem) (J.R.R. Tolkien)
- "The Dragon's Visit" (poem) (J.R.R. Tolkien)
- "Azlon" (from Khymyrium) (Lin Carter)

== Reception ==
The book was reviewed by Tony Lewis in Locus no. 44, December 17, 1969, Paul Walker in Science Fiction Review, April 1970, Robert A. W. Lowndes in Bizarre Fantasy Tales no. 2, March 1971, Klaus Leicht (in Magira no. 31, 1978, and Helmut Pesch, also in Magira no. 31, 1978.
