= Dragons, Elves, and Heroes =

1969 anthology edited by Lin Carter

- Cover of the first edition.
- Author: Edited by Lin Carter
- Cover artist: Sheryl Slavitt
- Language: English
- Series: Ballantine Adult Fantasy series
- Genre: Fantasy
- Publisher: Ballantine Books
- Publication date: 1969
- Publication place: United States
- Media type: Print (paperback)
- Pages: 277
- Followed by: The Young Magicians

Dragons, Elves, and Heroes is an American anthology of fantasy short stories, edited by American writer Lin Carter. It was first published in paperback by Ballantine Books in October 1969 as the sixth volume of its Ballantine Adult Fantasy series. It was the first such anthology assembled by Carter for the series, issued simultaneously with the second, The Young Magicians.

== Summary ==
The book collects nineteen early fantasy tales and poems by various authors, with an overall introduction and notes by Carter. Many of the pieces are medieval in date, and none later than the 19th century. The anthology is a companion volume to Carter's subsequent Golden Cities, Far (1970), which also collects early fantasies.

== Contents ==
- "Introduction: Over the Hills and Far Away" (Lin Carter)
- "The Ogre" - from Beowulf, translated by Norma Lorre Goodrich
- "The High History of the Sword Gram" - from the Völsunga saga, translated by William Morris
- "Manawyddan Son of the Boundless" - from the Mabinogion, retold by Kenneth Morris
- "Puck's Song" (poem) - from Puck of Pook's Hill, by Rudyard Kipling
- "Barrow-Wight" - from The Grettir Saga, translated by S. Baring-Gould
- "Fingal at the Siege of Carric-thura" - from The Poems of Ossian, by James Macpherson
- "The Sword of Avalon" - from Le Morte d'Arthur, by Thomas Malory
- "Tom O'Bedlam's Song" (poem), Anonymous
- "The Last Giant of the Elder Age" - from The Kiev Cycle, translated by Isabel Florence Hapgood
- "The Lost Words of Power" (poem) - from the Kalevala, translated by John Martin Crawford
- "Wonderful Things Beyond Cathay" - from Mandeville's Travels, edited by Arthur Layard
- "Prospero Evokes the Air Spirits" (poem) - from The Tempest, by William Shakespeare
- "The Lords of Faerie" - from The Faerie Queene, by Edmund Spenser
- "Tales of the Wisdom of the Ancients" - from The Gesta Romanorum, translated by Charles Swan and revised by Wynnard Hooper
- "The Magical Palace of Darkness" - from Palmerin of England, by Francisco de Moraes
- "Rustum Against the City of Demons" - from The Shah-Namah of Firdausi, in a version by Lin Carter
- "Childe Roland to the Dark Tower Came" (poem), by Robert Browning
- "The Princess of Babylon" - from The Romances of Voltaire
- "The Horns of Elfland" (poem), by Alfred, Lord Tennyson
- Untitled end note by Lin Carter

== Reception ==
The book was reviewed by Tony Lewis in Locus no. 44, December 17, 1969, Paul Walker in Science Fiction Review, April 1970, Robert A. W. Lowndes in Bizarre Fantasy Tales no. 2, March 1971, Klaus Leicht in Magira no. 31, 1978, and Everett F. Bleiler in The Guide to Supernatural Fiction, 1983.
