= Laura Kamoie =

American writer

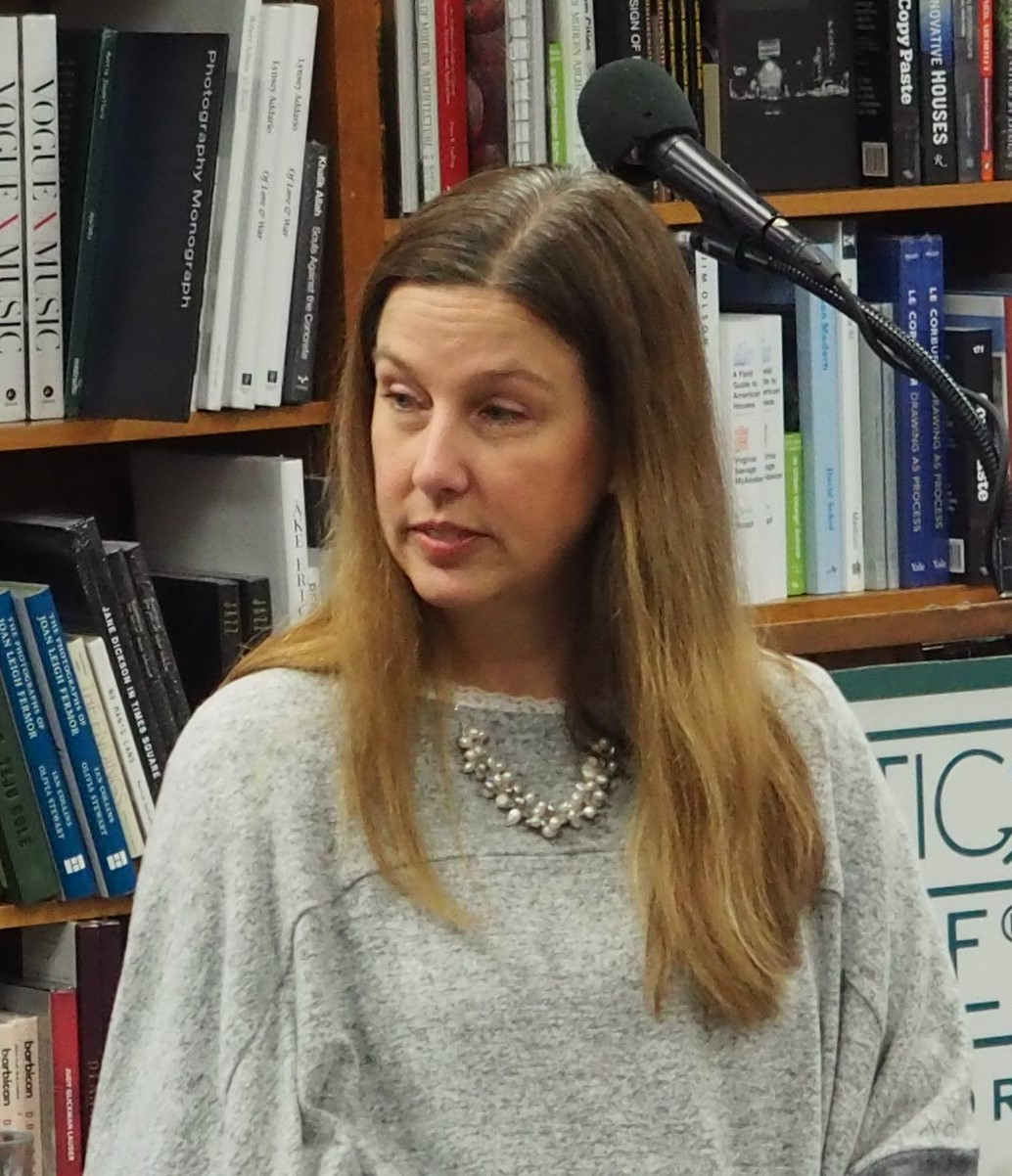
- Kamoie reading at Politics and Prose in Washington, D.C.
- Born: Laura A. Crogham; August 27, 1970 (age 56); Hagerstown, Maryland, U.S.
- Education: Dickinson College; College of William & Mary (MA, PhD)
- Occupations: Historian; author
- Spouse: Brian Kamoie (m. 1996)
- Writing career
- Pen name: Laura Kaye
- Genres: Historical fiction; romance

Laura Croghan Kamoie (born August 27, 1970) is an American historian and author. She writes historical fiction under her own name and romance under the name Laura Kaye.

== Life and academic career ==
She was born Laura A. Croghan on August 27, 1970, in Hagerstown, Maryland. A first-generation college student, she graduated cum laude from Dickinson College in 1992. At Dickinson, she met Brian Kamoie, later an official in the Obama administration, and they married in 1996.

Kamoie earned an MA and PhD in early American history from the College of William and Mary. Kamoie wrote two works focusing on the economic activity of the slaveholding colonial Tayloe family of Virginia. Neabsco and Occoquan: The Tayloe Family Iron Plantations, 1730-1830 (2003) won the Prince William County Historical Commission Dissertation Award. Irons in the Fire: The Business History of the Tayloe Family and Virginia's Gentry, 1700-1860 (2007) was published by the University of Virginia Press.

Kamoie worked as a historical archaeologist for the Colonial Williamsburg Foundation, curated exhibits for the Cumberland County Historical Society in Carlisle, PA, served as senior editor of Washington History, the journal of the Historical Society of Washington, D.C., and worked as project manager of the Adams Morgan Heritage Trail, a project of Cultural Tourism DC, where she wrote Roads to Diversity: The Adams Morgan Heritage Trail.

Kamoie was a professor of history at The Citadel from 1999 to 2000, American University from 2000 to 2005, and the US Naval Academy from 2005 to 2013, where she received tenure in 2008.

== Novelist ==
In 2008, Kamoie suffered a "mild traumatic brain injury". While recovering, Kamoie felt a creative urge, taking guitar lessons, changing her taste in music, and writing a novel inspired by the Twilight series in 11 weeks. She published her first novel, a romance called Hearts in Darkness, in 2011 with The Wild Rose Press under the pen name Laura Kaye. Success came relatively quickly, and in 2012 she sold her "Hard Ink" series, featuring a group of ex-military conducting covert operations out of a tattoo parlor, to Avon, subsidiary of HarperCollins, for six figures. The next year she sold her first historical novel, co-authored with Stephanie Dray, called America's First Daughter, about President Thomas Jefferson's eldest daughter Martha Jefferson Randolph, to William Morrow, subsidiary of HarperCollins. At the end of 2013, she left teaching to write full time. Kamoie describes her work under the name Laura Kaye as "romantic suspense and contemporary and erotic romance." In 2014, she sold her "Raven Riders" series, featuring a motorcycle club with special mission, again to Avon for six figures.

In 2016, she published her first work of historical fiction under her own name, co-authored with Stephanie Dray. America's First Daughter, about President Thomas Jefferson's eldest daughter Martha Jefferson Randolph, which became a New York Times bestseller, a Goodreads Readers' Choice Awards Finalist in Historical Fiction, and an Audie Award Finalist. In 2018, she co-authored a second novel with Stephanie Dray: My Dear Hamilton: A Novel of Eliza Schuyler Hamilton, inspired in part by Hamilton: An American Musical. In 2019, she was part of a six-author writing team who co-authored Ribbons of Scarlet: A Novel of the French Revolution's Women, which featured stories about historical figures including Sophie de Condorcet, Louise Audu, Elisabeth of France, Manon Roland, Charlotte Corday, Pauline Leon, and Emilie de Sainte-Amaranthe Sartine. In 2020, she sold her first solo novel of historical fiction, Churchill's Spymistress, about Special Operations Executive intelligence officer Vera Atkins and her first two female spies to parachute into occupied France, to Berkley, a subsidiary of Penguin Random House, in a six-figure deal. In 2021, she and co-author Stephanie Dray sold two novels to William Morrow in a seven-figure deal, including Founding Mother: The Story of Abigail Adams.

In 2021, Kamoie also authored a tour guide for visitors to the Thomas Jefferson Memorial about the creation of the Declaration of Independence entitled To Begin the World Again on the BARDEUM mobile app.

== Bibliography ==
=== as Laura Kamoie ===
- Neabsco and Occoquan: The Tayloe Family Iron Plantations, 1730-1830, Prince William Historical Commission (Prince William, VA), 2003.
- Irons in the Fire: The Business History of the Tayloe Family and Virginia's Gentry, 1700-1860, University of Virginia Press (Charlottesville, VA), 2007.
- (With Stephanie Dray) America's First Daughter (novel), William Morrow (New York, NY), 2016.
- (With Stephanie Dray) My Dear Hamilton: A Novel of Eliza Schuyler Hamilton (novel), William Morrow (New York, NY), 2018.
- (With Stephanie Dray, Kate Quinn, Heather Webb, Eliza Knight, and Sophie Perinot; with a foreword by Allison Pataki) Ribbons of Scarlet: A Novel of the Women of the French Revolution (novel), William Morrow (New York, NY), 2019.
- Churchill's Spymistress, Berkley Books, forthcoming.
- (With Stephanie Dray) Founding Mother: The Story of Abigail Adams, William Morrow, forthcoming.

=== as Laura Kaye ===
- Hearts in Darkness, The Wild Rose Press, 2011; self-published, 2013.
- Forever Freed, The Wild Rose Press, 2011; self-published, 2013.
- Just Gotta Say, Decadent Publishing, 2011; self-published, 2014.
- Dare to Resist, Entangled Publishing (Fort Collins, CO), 2014.
- (With others) Premiere (collection), Romance Writers of America, Incorporated (Houston, TX), 2015.

=== Heroes series (as Laura Kaye) ===
- Her Forbidden Hero, Entangled Publishing (Fort Collins, CO), 2012.
- One Night with a Hero, Entangled Publishing (Fort Collins, CO), 2012.

=== Hearts of the Anemoi series (as Laura Kaye) ===
- North of Need, Entangled Publishing (Fort Collins, CO), 2012.
- West of Want, Entangled Publishing (Fort Collins, CO), 2012.
- South of Surrender, Entangled Publishing (Fort Collins, CO), 2013.
- East of Ecstasy, Entangled Publishing (Fort Collins, CO), 2014.

=== Vampire Warrior Kings series (as Laura Kaye) ===
- In the Service of the King, Harlequin Nocturne Cravings (Don Mills, Ontario Canada), 2012; self-published, 2020.
- Seduced by the Vampire King, Harlequin Nocturne Cravings (Don Mills, Ontario Canada), 2012; self-published, 2020.
- Taken by the Vampire, Harlequin Nocturne Cravings (Don Mills, Ontario Canada), 2013; self-published, 2020.

=== Hard Ink series (as Laura Kaye) ===
- Hard as It Gets, Avon (New York, NY), 2013.
- Hard as You Can, Avon (New York, NY), 2014.
- Hard to Hold On To (novella), Avon (New York, NY), 2014.
- Hard to Come By, Avon (New York, NY), 2014.
- Hard to Be Good, Avon (New York, NY), 2015.
- Hard to Let Go, Avon (New York, NY), 2015.
- Hard as Steel, Evil Eye Concepts, 2015.
- Hard Ever After, Avon (New York, NY), 2016.
- Hard to Serve, Evil Eye Concepts, 2016.

=== Raven Riders series (as Laura Kaye) ===
- Ride Hard, Avon (New York, NY), 2016.
- Ride Rough, Avon (New York, NY), 2017.
- Ride Wild, Avon (New York, NY), 2017.
- Ride Dirty, Evil Eye Concepts, 2018.
- Ride Deep, self-published, 2019.

=== Hearts in Darkness Duet series (as Laura Kaye) ===
- Hearts in Darkness, self-published, 2013.
- Love in the Light, self-published, 2016.
- Hearts in Darkness Collection, self-published, 2021.

=== Blasphemy series (as Laura Kaye) ===
- Bound to Submit, self-published, 2016.
- Mastering Her Senses, self-published, 2017.
- Eyes on You, Evil Eye Concepts, 2017.
- Theirs to Take, self-published, 2017.
- On His Knees, self-published, 2018.

=== Warrior Fight Club series (as Laura Kaye) ===
- Fighting for Everything, self-published, 2018.
- Fighting for What's His, self-published, 2018.
- Worth Fighting For, Evil Eye Concepts, 2019.
- Fighting the Fire, self-published, 2021.
