= New Worlds for Old =

1971 anthology of fantasy short stories edited by Lin Carter

- Editor: Lin Carter
- Cover artist: David Johnston
- Language: English
- Series: Ballantine Adult Fantasy series
- Genre: Fantasy
- Publisher: Ballantine Books
- Publication date: 1971
- Publication place: United States
- Media type: Print (paperback)
- ISBN: 0-345-02365-X
- Preceded by: Golden Cities, Far
- Followed by: The Spawn of Cthulhu

New Worlds for Old is an anthology of fantasy short stories, edited by American writer Lin Carter. It was first published in paperback by Ballantine Books in September 1971 as the thirty-fifth volume of its Ballantine Adult Fantasy series. It was the fourth such anthology assembled by Carter for the series.

== Summary ==
The book collects fifteen fantasy tales and poems by various authors, with an overall introduction and individual introductions to each piece by Carter. The pieces range in date from the eighteenth to twentieth centuries. The collection is a companion volume to Carter's earlier The Young Magicians (1969), which also collects modern fantasies.

== Contents ==
- "Makers of Worlds: An Introduction" (Lin Carter)
- "Zulkaïs and Kalilah" (William Beckford; translated by Clark Ashton Smith)
- "Silence: a Fable" (Edgar Allan Poe)
- "The Romance of Photgen and Nycteris" (George MacDonald)
- "The Sphinx" (poem) (Oscar Wilde)
- "The Fall of Babbulkund" (Lord Dunsany)
- "The Green Meadow" (H. P. Lovecraft; with Elizabeth Berkeley)
- "The Feast in the House of the Worm" (Gary Myers)
- "Zingazar" (Lin Carter)
- "A Wine of Wizardry" (poem) (George Sterling)
- "The Garden of Fear" (Robert E. Howard)
- "Jirel Meets Magic" (C. L. Moore)
- "Duar the Accursed" (Clifford Ball)
- "The Hashish Eater" (poem) (Clark Ashton Smith)
- "The Party at Lady Cusp-Canine's" (Mervyn Peake)
- "The Sword of Power (from Khymyrium)" (Lin Carter)

== See also ==
- Lin Carter
