= Commentaires sur Corneille =

Work by Voltaire

- Author: Voltaire
- Original title: Commentaires sur Corneille
- Language: French
- Subject: Theatre
- Genre: Literary criticism
- Publication date: 1764
- Publication place: France

The Commentaires sur Corneille is a work of literary criticism by the French Enlightenment writer and philosopher Voltaire, collecting and analysing the dramatic works of Pierre Corneille (1608–1684). It was first published in 1764, printed in Geneva in twelve volumes. A second edition, published ten years later, added extensive critical commentary, reflecting changes in Voltaire's attitude to Corneille and to criticism. It was Voltaire's largest ever work of critical commentary, described by the author as a distillation of his fifty years of experience in theatre. Though very influential in the late eighteenth century, it was seen more negatively from 1800 onwards, as critics questioned the fairness of Voltaire's commentary and his motives.

== Background ==
Voltaire wrote to the Académie française on 10 April 1761, praising its effort to create standard editions of classic French literature. He asked for permission to edit a version of Corneille's dramas as part of this wider project. The response from Charles Pinot Duclos, the Académie's permanent secretary, was unenthusiastic. Voltaire wrote again on 1 May, with a more detailed proposal. He described Corneille as the Homer of the French language: a unique figure who had made the language popular in foreign cultures and shown that French work could be great art. He promised that funds raised by the publication would benefit a living relative of Corneille's, Marie Françoise Corneille. The proposal drew a favourable response from a meeting of the Académie, which was communicated to Voltaire on 19 May.

== Content ==
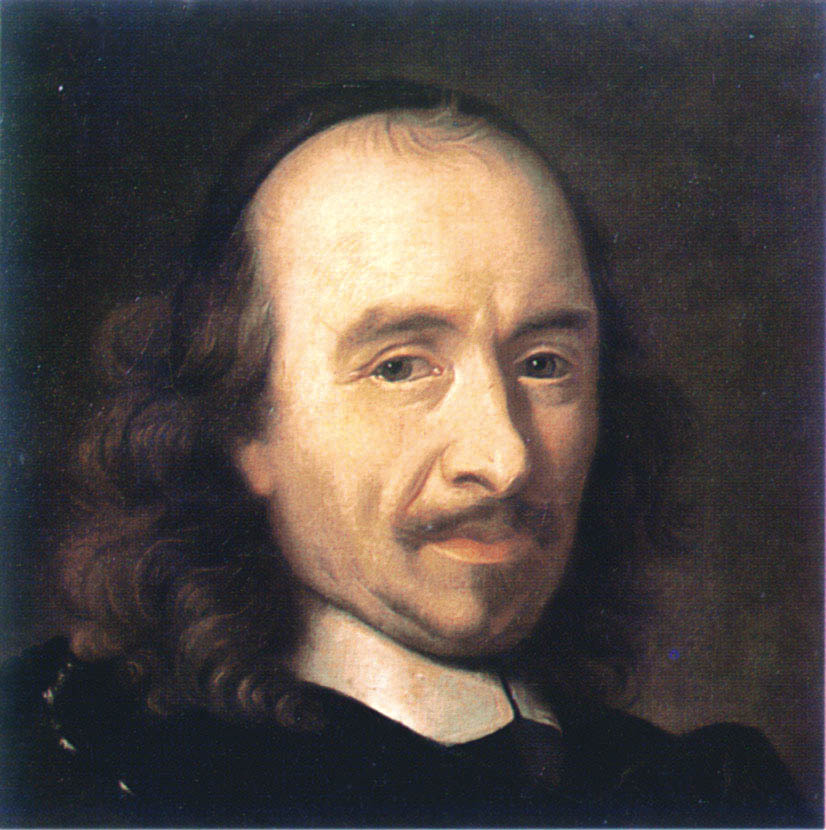
Pierre Corneille

Along with unaltered versions of Corneille's texts, Voltaire provided two layers of annotation. The first edition included footnotes and the second edition (published 1774) added five hundred sections of critical commentary. Between compiling the two editions, Voltaire's opinion of Corneille as a dramatist became much more negative. This is reflected in the second set of annotations which are more critical in scope and tone. Voltaire's enthusiasm for the project had been driven in part by a desire to defend classic French literature and values against foreign cultural influences. In the first edition, he had portrayed Corneille as a neglected genius: though there were some criticisms, they were muted and the commentary focused on the better works. By the second edition, Voltaire was more conscious of a critic's duty to be objective and to help others learn from an artist's mistakes.

The volumes also contained texts from other authors, chosen by Voltaire for comparison with Corneille's work. These included a translation of the first three acts of Shakespeare's Julius Caesar and extracts from plays by Jean Racine and Pedro Calderón de la Barca. In letters to the Académie, Voltaire defended comparison against these foreign texts as an essential part of criticism.

== Reception ==
Marie Corneille, who had been in poverty when Voltaire made his proposal to the Académie, made a large sum of money from sales of the books. The publication of the Commentaires sur Corneille energised an already highly polarised debate about Corneille and French drama in general. From 1800 onwards, critics accused Voltaire of pedantry, petty criticism and envy. Napoleon expressed a preference for Corneille over Voltaire, reviving the former's reputation as a dramatist while diminishing the latter's. Modern scholars, however, have largely neglected the Commentaires compared to Voltaire's other works. David Williams writes that "the surgical precision with which Voltaire remorselessly exposed the minutiae of Cornellian technique has, it would seem, taxed beyond endurance the patience of all but a handful of contemporary friends and supporters."

== Published editions ==
- Commentaires sur Corneille Critical edition by David Williams, in Œuvres complètes de Voltaire Volumes 53 to 55 (Voltaire Foundation, Oxford) ISBN 9780729400480
