= James Ridley =

English author

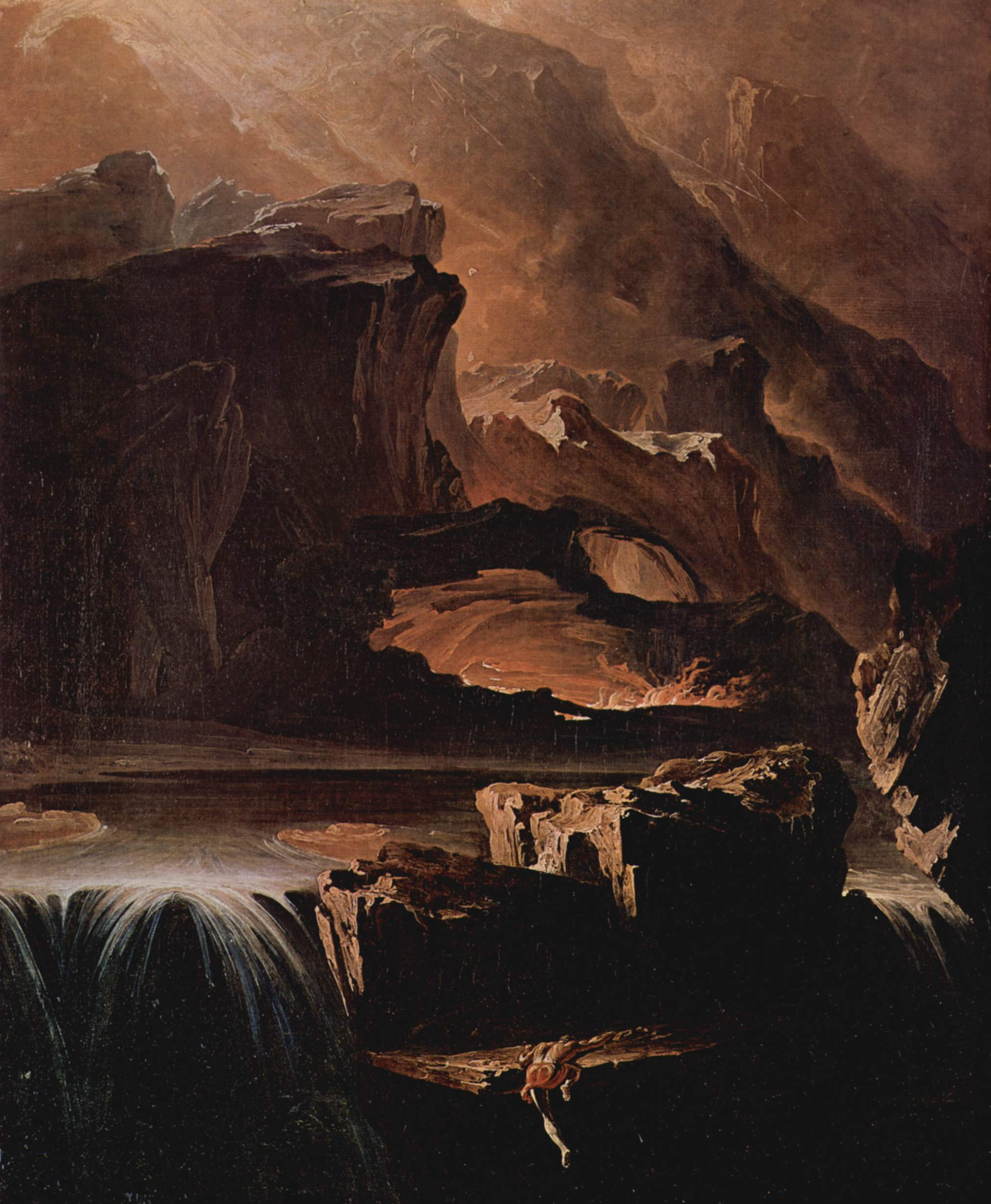
John Martin's painting Sadak in Search of the Waters of Oblivion illustrates an incident from James Ridley's The Tales of the Genii.

James Kenneth Ridley (1736–1765) was an English writer educated at University College, Oxford. He served as a chaplain with the British Army. He is best known for a volume of imitation Orientalia.

== Writings ==
Ridley wrote two novels: The History of James Lovegrove, Esquire (1761) and The Schemer, or the Universal Satirist, by that Great Philosopher Helter van Scelter (1763). However, he is mainly remembered for his Oriental pastiche The Tales of the Genii, a set of stories based on those of the Arabian Nights. That work, published in two volumes in 1764, was issued under the pseudonym "Sir Charles Morell", supposedly British Ambassador at Bombay.

Ridley's Tales were allegedly composed by an imam named Horam and translated from a Persian manuscript, but in actuality, they were products of Ridley's imagination. They belong to a genre of imitation, Orientalia, popular in the 18th century. In its own time and after, Ridley's book was compared to Samuel Johnson's Rasselas. It retained its popularity and had gone through seven editions by 1861. Translations into German and French also appeared.
