= Philipp Hafner =

Austrian farce writer

Philipp Hafner (September 27, 1735 (some sources say 1731) - July 30, 1764) was an Austrian farce writer, born in Vienna. He also wrote under the pseudonyms K. Fiedelbogen, J. Wustio, and Phakipinpler. His principal works are the following: Der alte Odoardo und der lächerliche Hanswurst (1755); Die reisenden Komödianten (1774), a comedy full of wit and humor; Dramatische Unterhaltungen ůnter guten Freuden (1774). His collected comedies were published by Joseph Sonnleithner in 1812 (Vienna).
