= Sketch for a Historical Picture of the Progress of the Human Mind =

Work by Marquis de Condorcet

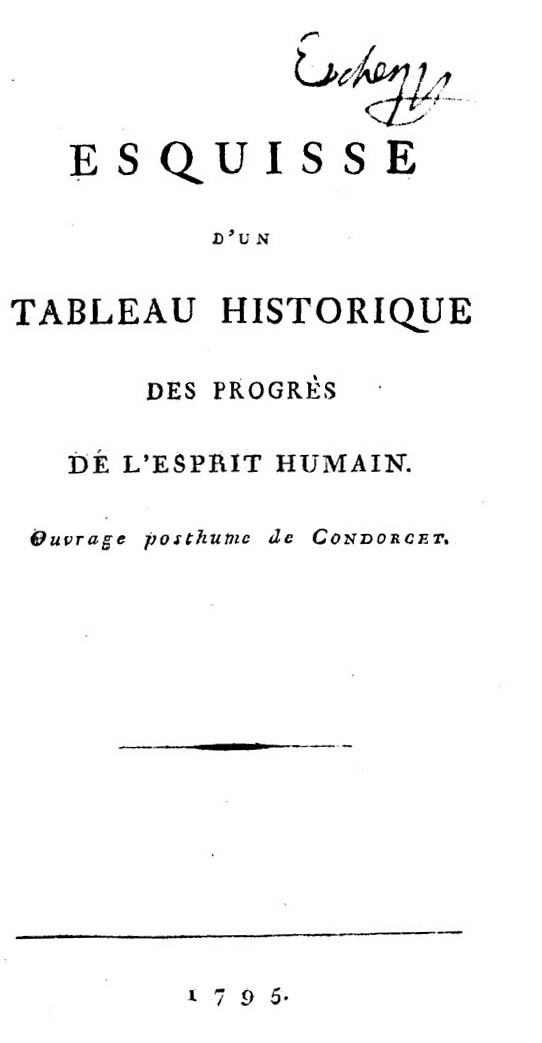
- Title page of an early French edition
- Author: Marquis de Condorcet
- Original title: Esquisse d'un tableau historique des progrès de l'esprit humain
- Language: French
- Publication date: 1795
- Publication place: France
- Media type: Print

Sketch for a Historical Picture of the Progress of the Human Mind (French: Esquisse d'un tableau historique des progrès de l'esprit humain) is a work by the French philosopher and mathematician Marquis de Condorcet, written in 1794 while in hiding during the French Revolution and published posthumously in 1795.

== Description ==
Condorcet's Sketch for a Historical Picture of the Progress of the Human Spirit was perhaps the most influential formulation of the idea of progress ever written. It made the Idea of Progress a central concern of Enlightenment thought. He argued that expanding knowledge in the natural and social sciences would lead to an ever more just world of individual freedom, material affluence, and moral compassion. He argued for three general propositions: that the past revealed an order that could be understood in terms of the progressive development of human capabilities, showing that humanity's "present state, and those through which it has passed, are a necessary constitution of the moral composition of humankind"; that the progress of the natural sciences must be followed by progress in the moral and political sciences "no less certain, no less secure from political revolutions"; that social evils are the result of ignorance and error rather than an inevitable consequence of human nature.

Condorcet's writings were a key contribution to the French Enlightenment, particularly his work on the Idea of Progress. Condorcet believed that through the use of our senses and communication with others, knowledge could be compared and contrasted as a way of analyzing our systems of belief and understanding through 10 epochs (stages). None of Condorcet's writings refer to a belief in a religion or a god who intervenes in human affairs. Condorcet instead frequently had written of his faith in humanity itself and its ability to progress with the help of philosophers such as Aristotle. Through this accumulation and sharing of knowledge he believed it was possible for any man to comprehend all the known facts of the natural world. The enlightenment of the natural world spurred the desire for enlightenment of the social and political world. Condorcet believed that there was no definition of the perfect human existence and thus believed that the progression of the human race would inevitably continue throughout the course of our existence. He envisioned man as continually progressing toward a perfectly utopian society. However, he stressed that for this to be a possibility man must unify regardless of race, religion, culture or gender.

Here is a quote from the 1795 English edition of his book:

Contempt for human sciences was one of the first features of Christianity. It had to avenge itself of the outrages of philosophy; it feared that spirit of investigation and doubt, that confidence of man in his own reason, the pest alike of all religious creeds. The fight of the natural sciences was even odious to it, and was regarded with a suspicious eye, as being a dangerous enemy to the success of miracles: and there is no religion that does not oblige its sectaries to swallow some physical absurdities.

The triumph of Christianity was thus the signal of the entire decline both of the sciences and of philosophy.

Had the art of printing been known, the sciences would have been able to preserve their ground; but the existing manuscripts of any particular book were few in number; and to procure works that might form the entire body of a science, required cares, and often journies (sic) and an expence (sic) to which the rich only were competent. It was easy for the ruling party to suppress the appearance of books which shocked its prejudices, or unmasked its impostures. See page 128.

== Influence ==
Thomas Malthus' An Essay on the Principle of Population (1798) was partly written as a response to Condorcet's Sketch, as is evidenced by the first edition's full title: "An Essay on the Principle of Population, as it affects the Future Improvement of Society with remarks on the Speculations of Mr. Godwin, M. Condorcet, and Other Writers".
