= Sophie de Condorcet =

French salon hostess

Sophie de Grouchy
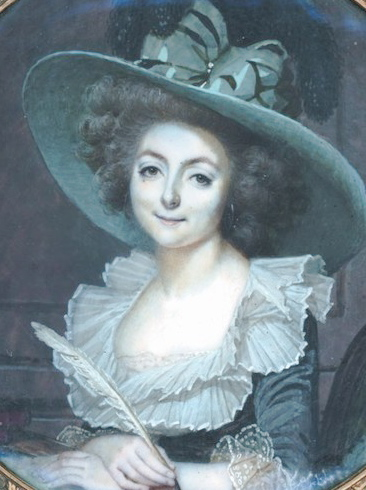
- Sophie de Condorcet (self portrait)
- Born: Marie-Louise-Sophie de Grouchy; 8 April 1764; Meulan, France
- Died: 8 September 1822 (aged 58); Paris, France
- Other name: Madame de Condorcet
- Known for: Translator, philosopher
- Spouse: Nicolas de Condorcet (m. 1786; died 1794)

Sophie de Condorcet (French: [sɔfi də kɔ̃dɔʁsɛ]; 1764 – 8 September 1822), also known as Sophie de Grouchy and best known and styled as Madame de Condorcet, was a prominent French salon hostess from 1789 to the Reign of Terror, and again from 1799 until her death in 1822. She was also a philosopher and the wife of the mathematician and philosopher Nicolas de Condorcet, who died during the Reign of Terror. Despite his death and the exile of her brother, Marshal Emmanuel de Grouchy, between 1815 and 1821, she maintained her own identity and was well-connected and influential before, during, and after the French Revolution.

As a hostess, Madame de Condorcet was popular for her kind heart, beauty, and indifference to a person's class or social origins. Unlike that of her fellow-Girondist hostess Madame Roland, Madame de Condorcet's salon always included other women, notably Olympe de Gouges. Condorcet was also a writer and a translator, being highly educated for her day, and was fluent in English and Italian. Her most important philosophical writing is The Letters on Sympathy, which was published in 1798. She was also an influential translator of and commenter on works by Thomas Paine and Adam Smith.

== Background ==
Marie-Louise-Sophie de Grouchy was the daughter of François-Jacques de Grouchy, 1st Marquis de Grouchy (born 1715), a former page of Louis XV, and his wife Marie-Gilberte-Henriette Fréteau de Pény, daughter of Michel Louis Fréteau de Pény, Seigneur de Vaux-le-Pénil. She was the elder sister of the Napoleonic Marshal Emmanuel de Grouchy.

In 1786 Sophie de Grouchy married the famous mathematician and philosopher Marie-Jean-Antoine-Nicolas de Caritat, Marquis de Condorcet (17 September 1743 – 29 March 1794). Then 21 or 22, she was an acknowledged beauty; he was 42 and Inspector-General of the Mint and a prominent French Academician. Although there was a twenty-year age difference, the two shared many intellectual interests, and had a strong and happy marriage.

== The salon ==
After her marriage, Madame de Condorcet started a famous salon at Hôtel des Monnaies in Paris, opposite the Louvre, and later at the Rue de Lille in Paris, that was attended by, among many others, many foreign visitors including Thomas Jefferson, British aristocrats Charles Stanhope, 3rd Earl Stanhope, David Murray, 7th Viscount Stormont (later 2nd Earl of Mansfield), the economist Adam Smith, the Marquis de Beccaria, Turgot, the writer Pierre Beaumarchais, the pamphleteer Olympe de Gouges, the writer and hostess Germaine de Staël and many French philosophers. This salon played an important role in the rise of the Girondin movement that stressed the rights of women.

Sophie de Condorcet allowed the Cercle Social — an association with the goal of equal political and legal rights for women — to meet at her house. Its members included women's rights advocate Olympe de Gouges who had published the Declaration of the Rights of Woman and of the Female Citizen (1791). It has been argued that Sophie de Condorcet's own interest in women's rights were responsible for her husband's arguments for greater rights for women in the ten-page essay "Sur l’admission des femmes au droit de cité" (3 July 1790). Unfortunately, this essay had little influence in its day, being overshadowed by the more passionate essays by British feminist Mary Wollstonecraft (who visited Paris from 1791 to 1793) and de Gouges; the latter for certain attended Madame de Condorcet's salons.

== Proscription and death of the Marquis de Condorcet ==
Claire Tomalin's The Life and Death of Mary Wollstonecraft mentions their sad history. The Marquis de Condorcet denounced the new Jacobin constitution which had no safeguards of the kind envisaged by him and the Girondins, and then went into hiding for eight months. His wife visited him secretly. Along with his friends, she encouraged de Condorcet to continue to write while in hiding. During this period, 1793–1794, he composed his most famous work— Esquisse d'un Tableau Historique des Progrès de l'Esprit Humain (Sketch for a Historical Picture of the Progress of the Human Mind). He also wrote Avis d'un Proscrit à sa Fille for his young daughter.

While the Marquis was in hiding, his wife filed for divorce, with his secret consent. Their relationship remained strong, but due to laws allowing the government to confiscate the property of proscribed citizens, a divorce would enable his wife and daughter to keep their family assets.

The Marquis, hearing of a coming raid, lost his nerve and fled his friend's roof, believing that his presence had been detected. He approached the country home of the Suards hoping they would shelter him, but Suard refused him shelter, claiming that a patriot servant in their home would betray Condorcet. Mme. Suard, with whom Condorcet had once been in love and had exchanged letters with for many years, wrote afterwards in a very sentimental tone (probably falsely, as she had been upset with him ever since his marriage to Sophie) of her guilt and wishes that she could have protected him. He was discovered shortly afterwards in a tavern at the edge of the city. The suspicious peasants there handed him over to the authorities, and he was found dead after the first night in prison.

Although he might have died of hardship, an embolism, or other natural causes, most historians today believe that he poisoned himself, possibly with the help of his sister-in-law's lover Cabanis. According to Tomalin, Sophie de Condorcet was not informed about his death until several months later.

Madame de Condorcet had his last works published posthumously, starting with the Sketch or Equisse in 1795.

== Translations and the revival of the salon ==
Sophie de Condorcet was rendered penniless by her husband's proscription and his death which came before their divorce. Her financial circumstances compelled to support not only herself and her then four-year-old daughter Eliza, but also her younger sister, Charlotte de Grouchy. Madame de Condorcet was obliged to open a shop to survive, and put aside her writing and translation work.

After the end of the Jacobin Terror a few months later in Thermidor of the year II (July 1794), de Condorcet published a translation of Adam Smith's Theory of Moral Sentiments (1759) in 1798, adding eight letters, Lettres sur la Sympathie, commenting upon this work. This became the standard French translation for the next two centuries. De Condorcet's eight letters on sympathy were however ignored by historians of economic thought, and were just recently translated into English (Brown, 2008). In 1799, de Condorcet also arranged to publish her husband's Éloges des Academiciens, and was finally able to revive her salon at the former home of another salon hostess Madame Helvétius at Auteuil (Guillois 1897, pp. 94, 177).

De Condorcet worked with her brother-in-law, the philosopher and doctor Pierre Jean Georges Cabanis (who had married her sister Charlotte some time between 1794 and 1800), and with Joseph Garat to publish her husband's complete works in 21 volumes between 1801 and 1804. She adhered to the end to her husband's political views, and under the Consulate and Empire, her salon became a meeting place for those opposed to the autocratic regime. Sophie de Condorcet survived the French Revolution, the Directory, and the era of Napoleon, to witness the revival of reaction under the restored Bourbons.

== Life during the Napoleonic regime ==
De Condorcet remained active as a salon hostess, and in promoting her late husband's political views.

Sophie de Condorcet died in Paris on 8 September 1822. Even at the end, she was determined to preserve Condorcet's memory through his works, and was preparing to bring out a new edition.

== Eliza Condorcet-O'Connor ==
The de Condorcets had one daughter Alexandrine Louise Sophie de Caritat de Condorcet (b 1790/1-1859), who was called Eliza (or Liza, or Elisa) for short. She survived to marry on 4 July 1807 an exiled Irish revolutionary, Arthur O'Connor (1763/5-1852, born in Mitchelstown, in County Cork). At 44 (more than twice her age), he was almost as old as Eliza's mother.

He was later called General Condorcet-O'Connor, and achieved some standing with Napoleon. By a strange coincidence, Eliza's maternal uncle, Grouchy, had commanded the army forces in the abortive invasion of Ireland of 1796–1797.

Eliza and Arthur Condorcet-O'Connor's efforts took over where Eliza's mother had left off, publishing Eliza's father's works in twelve volumes in 1847–1849.

Eliza (or Elisa) and Arthur had five children, including three sons, all of whom died before their father in 1852. Only one son Daniel (1810–1851) married and left posterity.

Children of Arthur O'Connor and Elisa de Condorcet:

- Daniel O'Connor (1810–1851) He married 1843 Ernestine Duval du Fraville (1820–1877, who died at Cannes), and had two sons, Arthur O'Connor, and Fernand O'Connor.
- two other sons, two daughters

Daniel's descendants served as officers in the French army. According to Clifford D. Conner (biographer of Arthur O'Connor), the O'Connor descendants still live at Chateau du Bignon. Among these was poet Patrice de La Tour du Pin.

== Sources ==
=== In French ===
- Madeleine Arnold-Tétard, Sophie de Grouchy, marquise de Condorcet : la dame de cœur, Paris, Christian, 2003
- M. d’Arvor, Les femmes illustres de la France : Madame de Condorcet (1764–1822), Paris, P. Boulinier, Librairie Moderne, 1897
- Thierry Boissel, Sophie de Condorcet, femme des Lumières, 1764–1822, Paris, Presses de la Renaissance, 1988
- Antoine Guillois, La marquise de Condorcet: sa famille, son salon, ses amis, 1764–1822, Paris, P. Ollendorff, 1897
- Charles Léger, Captives de l'amour, d'après des documents inédits; lettres intimes de Sophie de Condorcet, d'Aimée de Coigny et de quelques autres cœurs sensibles, Paris, C. Gaillandre, 1933
- Jules Michelet, Les Femmes de la Révolution available from Project Gutenberg
- Henri Valentino, Madame de Condorcet; ses amis et ses amours, 1764–1822, Paris, Perrin, 1950

=== In English ===
- Barbara Brookes, The Feminism of Condorcet and Sophie de Grouchy, 189 Studies on Voltaire and the Eighteenth Century 297–361 (1980).
- Karin Brown, "Sophie Grouchy de Condorcet on Moral Sympathy and Social Progress" (Dissertation, City University of New York, 1997).
- Steven Kale, French Salons: High Society and Political Sociability from the Old Regime to the Revolution of 1848. The Johns Hopkins University Press (8 March 2004)
- Karin Brown, "Sophie de Grouchy, Letters on Sympathy (1798)." Letters translated by James McClellan. American Philosophical Society 98, pt. 4.
