= The Coronation of Queen Victoria =

The Coronation of Queen Victoria may refer to:

- Coronation of Queen Victoria in 1838
- The Coronation of Queen Victoria (Hayter), an 1839 painting by George Hayter
- The Coronation of Queen Victoria (Martin), an 1839 painting by John Martin
