= John Martin (painter) =

English painter, engraver and illustrator (1789–1854)

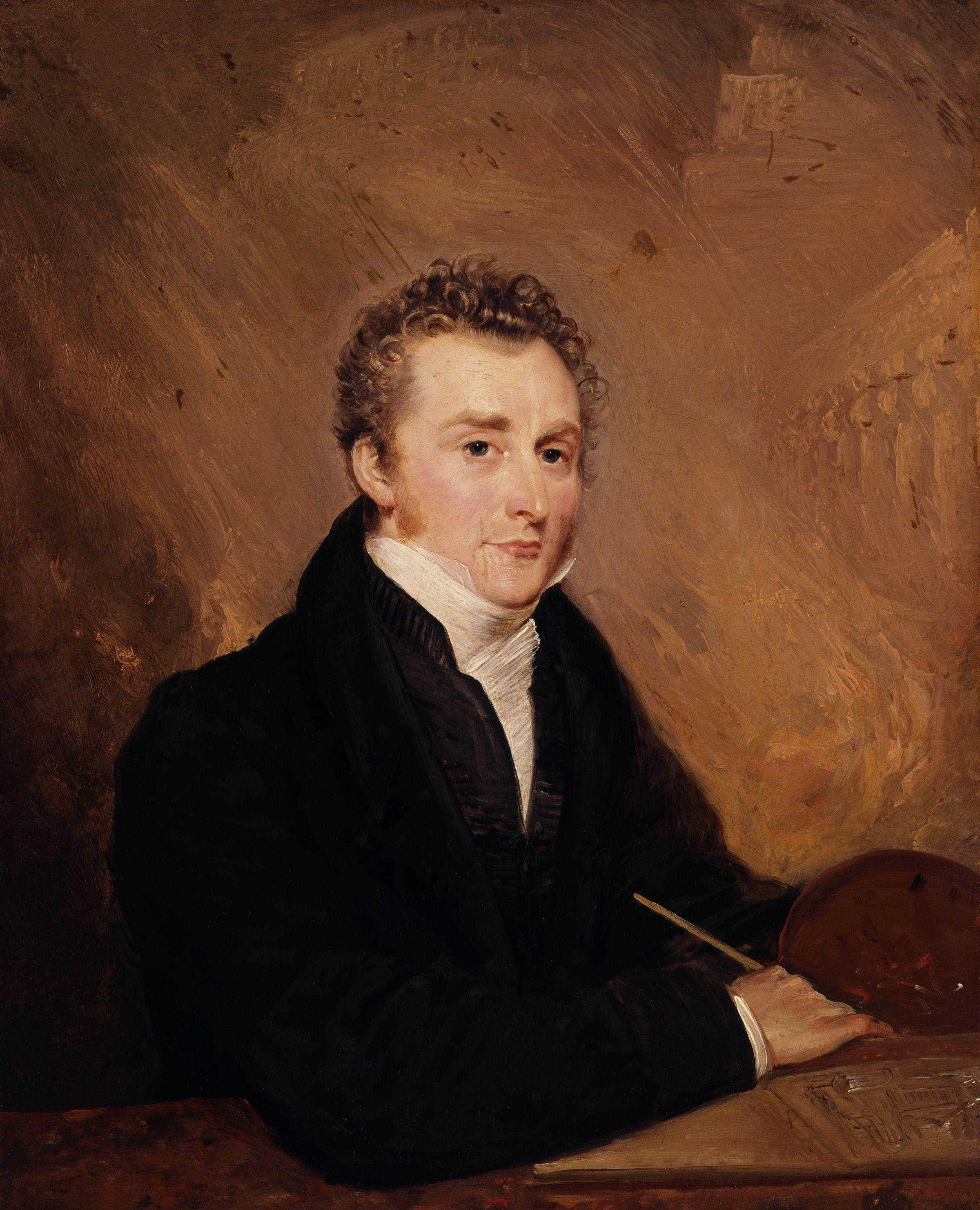
- Portrait by Henry Warren, 1839
- Born: 19 July 1789; Haydon Bridge, Northumberland, England
- Died: 17 February 1854 (aged 64); Douglas, Isle of Man
- Movement: Romanticism
- Spouse: Susan Martin (m. 1818)

John Martin (19 July 1789 – 17 February 1854) was an English Romantic painter, engraver, and illustrator. He was known for his typically vast and dramatic paintings of religious subjects and fantastic compositions, populated with minute figures placed in imposing landscapes. Martin's paintings, and the prints made from them, enjoyed great success with the general public, with Thomas Lawrence referring to him as "the most popular painter of his day". He was also criticised by John Ruskin and other critics.

== Early life ==
Martin was born in July 1789 in a one-room cottage, at Haydon Bridge, near Hexham in Northumberland, North East England. He was the fourth son of Fenwick Martin, former fencing master. He was apprenticed by his father to a coachbuilder in Newcastle upon Tyne to learn heraldic painting, but owing to a dispute over wages the indentures were cancelled, and he was placed instead under Boniface Musso, an Italian artist, father of the enamel painter Charles Muss.

With his master, Martin moved from Newcastle to London in 1806, where he married at the age of nineteen. He supported himself by giving drawing lessons, and by painting in watercolours, as well as on china and glass — his only surviving painted plate is now in a private collection in England. In his leisure time, he studied perspective and architecture.

His brothers were William, the eldest, an inventor; Richard, a tanner who became a soldier in the Northumberland Fencibles in 1798, rising to the rank of Quartermaster Sergeant in the Grenadier Guards and fought in the Peninsular War and at Waterloo; and Jonathan, a preacher tormented by madness who set fire to York Minster in 1829, for which he stood trial.

== Beginnings as artist ==
Martin began to supplement his income by painting sepia watercolours. He sent his first oil painting to the Royal Academy in 1810, but it was not hung. In 1811 he sent the painting once again, when it was hung under the title A Landscape Composition as item no.46 in the Great Room. Thereafter, he produced a succession of large exhibited oil paintings: some landscapes, but more usually grand biblical themes inspired by the Old Testament. His landscapes have the ruggedness of the Northumberland crags, while some authors claim that his apocalyptic canvasses, such as The Destruction of Sodom and Gomorrah, show his familiarity with the forges and ironworks of the Tyne Valley and display his intimate knowledge of the Old Testament.

In the years of the Regency from 1812 onwards there was a fashion for such 'sublime' paintings. Martin's first break came at the end of a season at the Royal Academy, where his first major sublime canvas Sadak in Search of the Waters of Oblivion had been hung—and ignored. He brought it home, only to find there a visiting card from William Manning MP, who wanted to buy it from him. Patronage propelled Martin's career.

This promising career was interrupted by the deaths of his father, mother, grandmother and young son in a single year. Another distraction was William, who frequently asked him to draw up plans for his inventions, and whom he always indulged with help and money. But, heavily influenced by the works of John Milton, he continued with his grand themes despite setbacks. In 1816 Martin finally achieved public acclaim with Joshua Commanding the Sun to Stand Still upon Gibeon, even though it broke many of the conventional rules of composition. In 1818, on the back of the sale of the Fall of Babylon for £420 (equivalent to £20,000 in 2015), he finally rid himself of debt and bought a house in Marylebone, where he came into contact with artists, writers, scientists and Whig nobility.

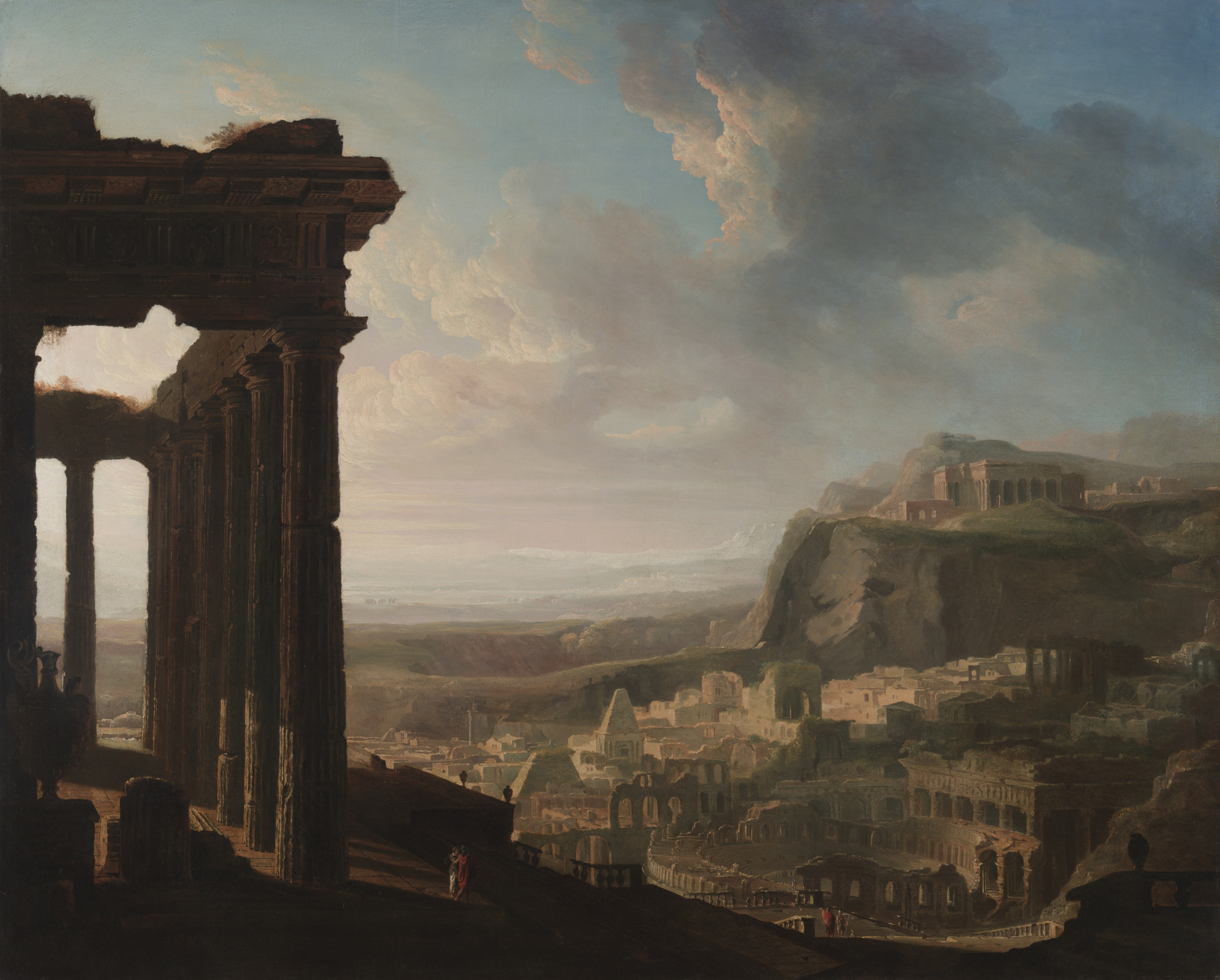
Ruins of an Ancient City (1810). Oil on paper, mounted on canvas, 95.6 x 118.6 cm. Cleveland Museum of Art, Ohio

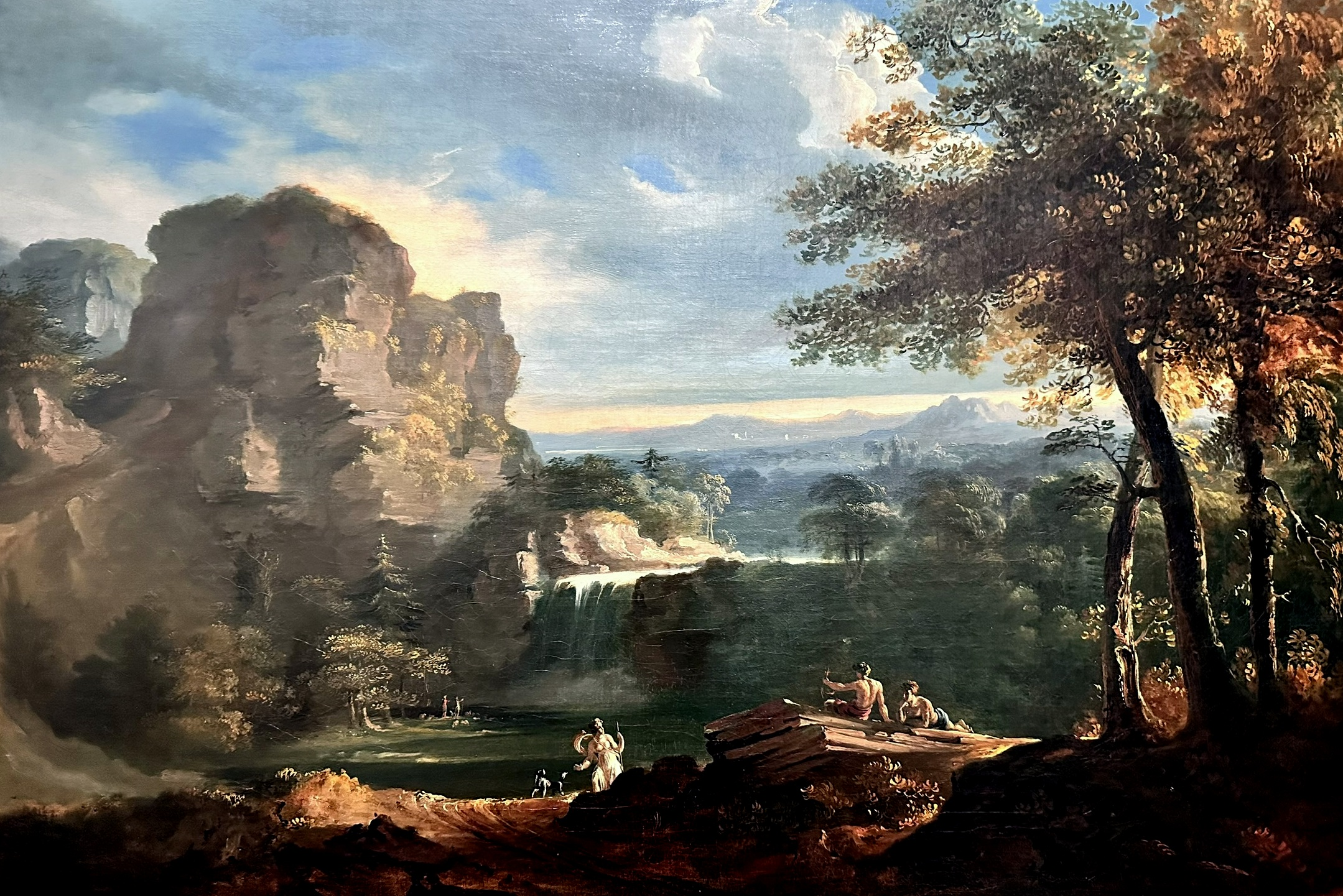
Arcadian Landscape (1810–14). Oil on canvas. Museum of the Shenandoah Valley

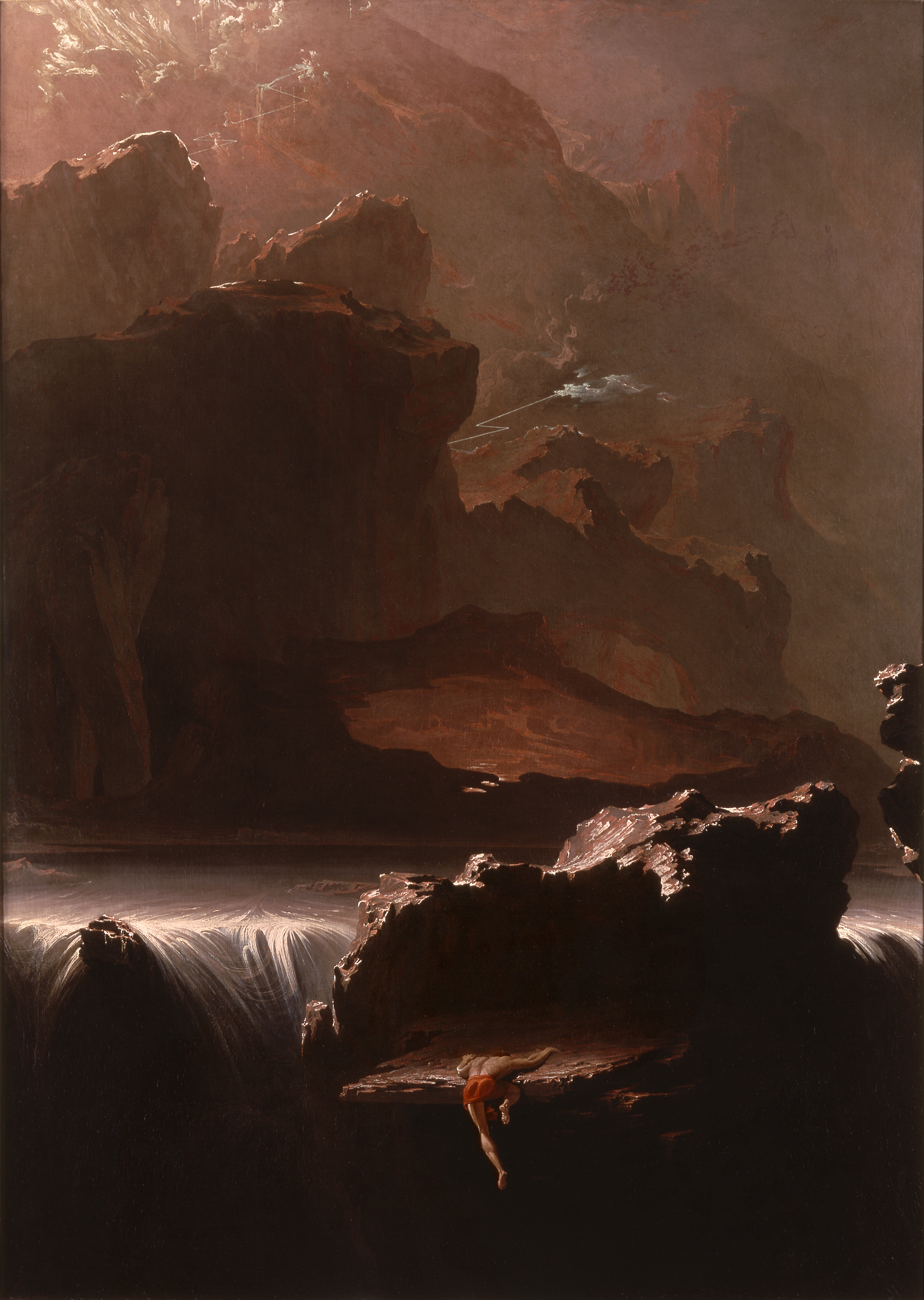
Sadak in Search of the Waters of Oblivion (1812). Oil on canvas, 76.2 × 63.5 cm. Saint Louis Art Museum, Missouri

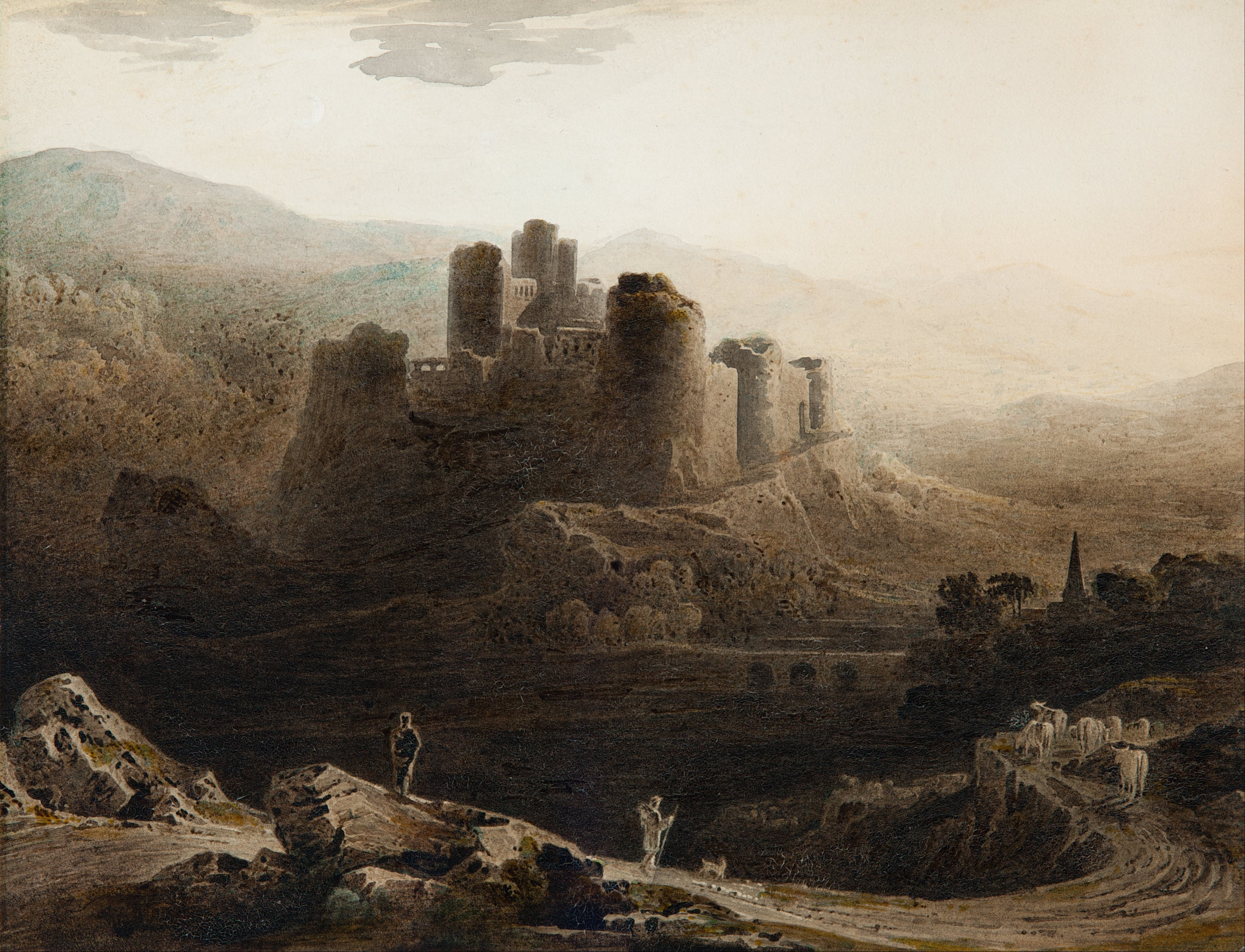
Moonlight, Chepstow Castle (1815). Watercolour with gum arabic. Art Gallery of South Australia, Adelaide

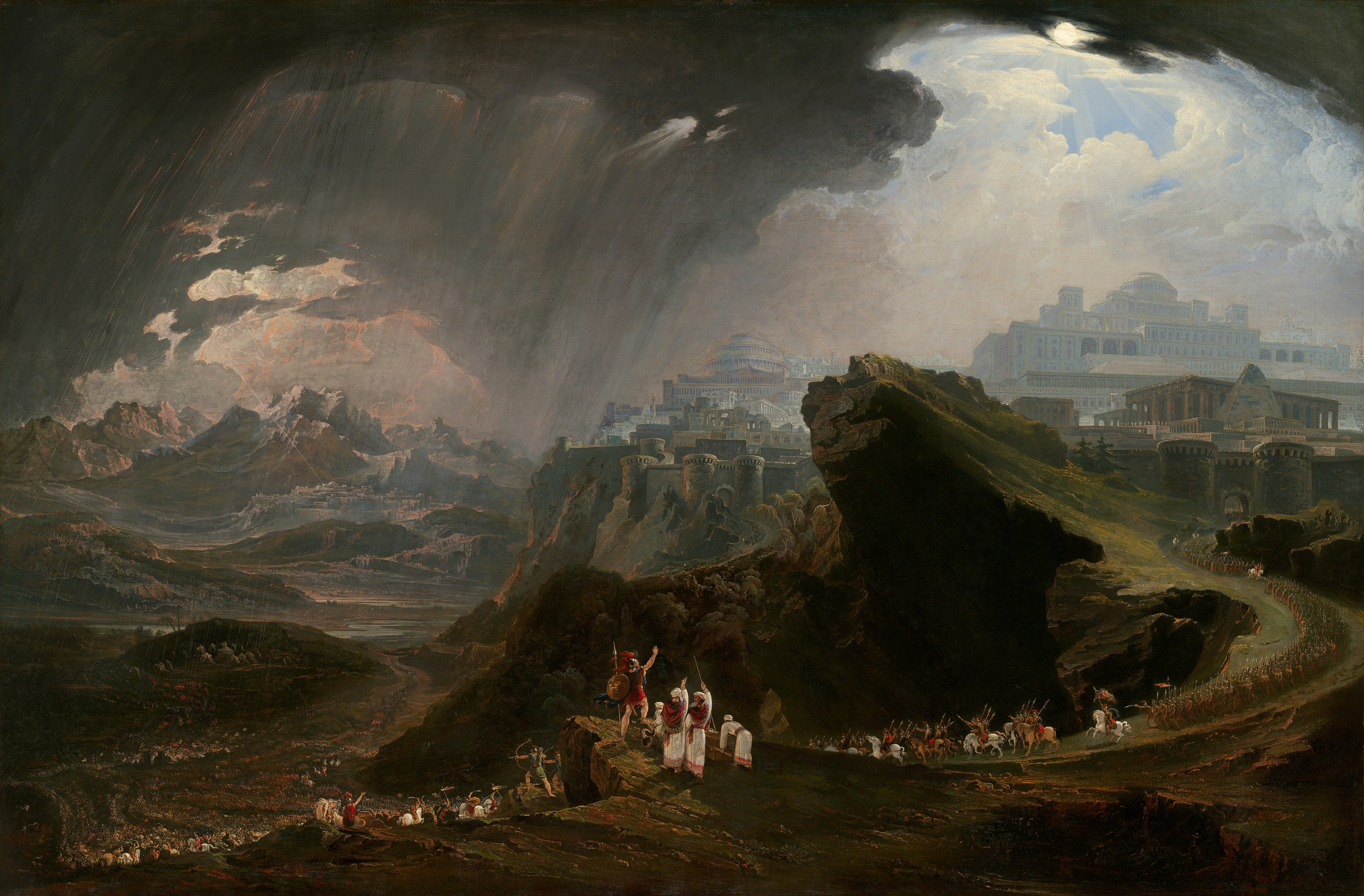
Joshua Commanding the Sun to Stand Still upon Gibeon (1816). Oil on canvas, 150 x 231 cm. National Gallery of Art, Washington, D.C.

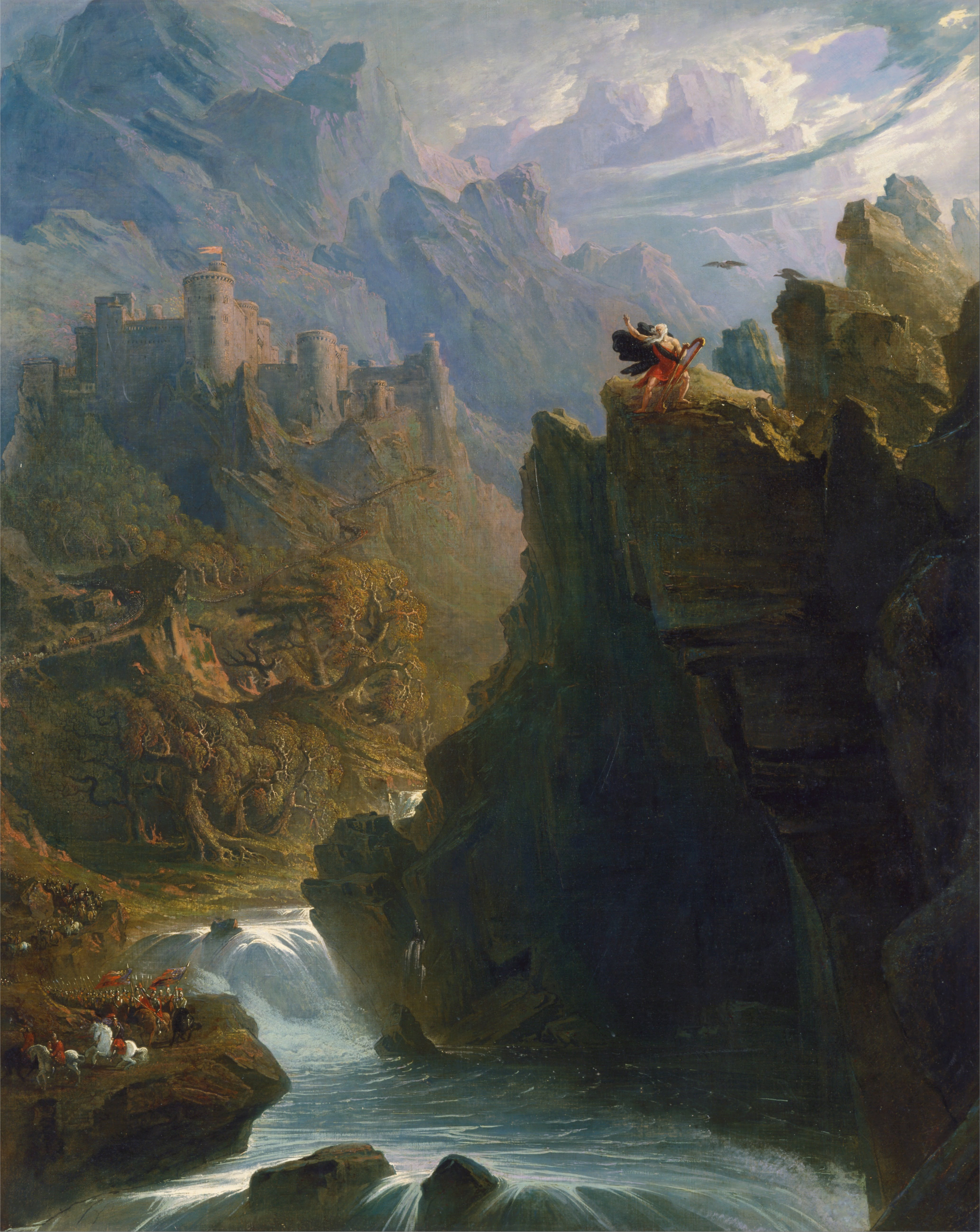
The Bard (c. 1817). Oil on canvas, 127 x 101.6 cm. Yale Center for British Art, New Haven, Connecticut

== Painter of repute ==
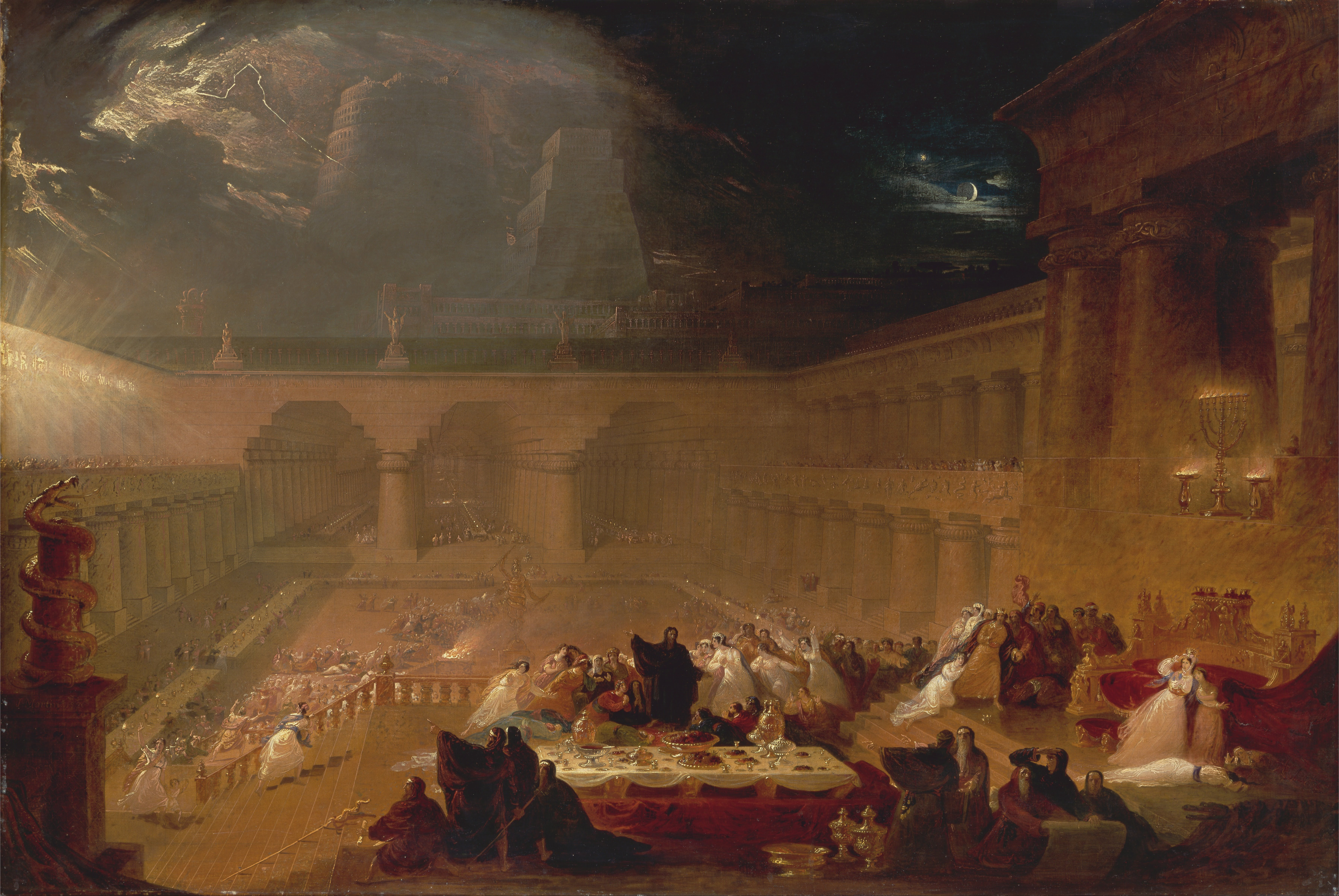
Belshazzar's Feast (1820). Oil on canvas, 90.2 x 130.2 cm. Yale Center for British Art, New Haven

Martin's triumph was Belshazzar's Feast (1820), of which he boasted beforehand, "it shall make more noise than any picture ever did before... only don't tell anyone I said so." Five thousand people paid to see it. It was later nearly ruined when the carriage in which it was being transported was struck by a train at a level crossing near Oswestry. In private, Martin was passionate and devoted to chess, and, like his brothers, to swordsmanship and javelin-throwing. He was also a devout Christian, believing in natural religion. Despite an often cited singular instance of his hissing at the national anthem, he was courted by royalty and presented with several gold medals, one of them from the future Russian Tsar Nicholas I, on whom a visit to Wallsend colliery on Tyneside had made an unforgettable impression: "My God," he had cried, "it is like the mouth of Hell." Martin became the official historical painter to Prince Leopold of Saxe-Coburg, later the first King of Belgium. Leopold was the godfather of Martin's son Leopold, and endowed Martin with the Order of Leopold. Martin frequently had early morning visits from another Saxe-Coburg, Prince Albert, who would engage him in banter from his horse—Martin standing in the doorway still in his dressing gown—at seven o'clock in the morning. Martin was a defender of deism and natural religion, evolution (before Charles Darwin) and rationality. Georges Cuvier became an admirer of Martin's, and he increasingly enjoyed the company of scientists, artists and writers—Charles Dickens, Michael Faraday and J. M. W. Turner among them. Between 1849 and 1853, Martin took a home near Turner in Chelsea, London.

Martin began to experiment with mezzotint technology, and as a result was commissioned to produce 24 engravings for a new edition of Paradise Lost—perhaps the definitive illustrations of Milton's masterpiece, of which copies now fetch many hundreds of pounds. Politically his sympathies are not clear; some claim he was a radical, but this is not borne out by known facts, although he knew William Godwin, the ageing reformed revolutionist, husband of Mary Wollstonecraft and father of Mary Shelley; and John Hunt, co-founder of The Examiner.

At one time the Martins took under their wing a young woman called Jane Webb, who at twenty produced The Mummy! a socially optimistic but satirical vision of a steam-driven world in the 22nd century. Another friend was Charles Wheatstone, professor of physics at King's College, London. Wheatstone experimented with telegraphy and invented the concertina and stereoscope; Martin was fascinated by his attempts to measure the speed of light. Accounts of Martin's evening parties reveal an astonishing array of thinkers, eccentrics and social movers; one witness was a young John Tenniel—later the illustrator of Lewis Carroll's work—who was heavily influenced by Martin and was a close friend of his children. At various points Martin's brothers were also among the guests, their eccentricities and conversation adding to the already exotic flavour of the fare.

== Paintings ==
His first exhibited subject picture, Sadak in Search of the Waters of Oblivion (now in the St. Louis Art Museum), was hung in the Ante-room of the Royal Academy in 1812, and sold for fifty guineas. The piece depicts a scene from the Tales of Two Genii. It was followed by the Expulsion (1813), Adam's First Sight of Eve (1813), Clytie (1814), Joshua Commanding the Sun to Stand Still upon Gibeon (1816) and The Fall of Babylon (1819). In 1820 appeared his Belshazzar's Feast, which excited much favourable and hostile comment, and was awarded a prize of £200 at the British Institution, where the Joshua had previously carried off a premium of £100. Then came The Destruction of Pompeii and Herculaneum (1822), The Creation (1824), The Eve of the Deluge (1840), and a series of other Biblical and imaginative subjects. The Plains of Heaven is thought by some to reflect his memories of the Allendale of his youth.

Martin's large paintings were closely connected with contemporary dioramas or panoramas, popular entertainments in which large painted cloths were displayed, and animated by the skilful use of artificial light. Martin has often been claimed as a forerunner of the epic cinema, and there is no doubt that the pioneer director D. W. Griffith was aware of his work." In turn, the diorama makers borrowed Martin's work, to the point of plagiarism. A 2,000-square-foot (190 m^{2}) version of Belshazzar's Feast was mounted at a facility called the British Diorama in 1833; Martin tried, but failed, to shut down the display with a court order. Another diorama of the same picture was staged in New York City in 1835. These dioramas were tremendous successes with their audiences, but wounded Martin's reputation in the serious art world. The painting The Destruction of Sodom and Gomorrah, 1852 is currently at the Laing Art Gallery in Newcastle upon Tyne.

Following their exhibition at the Royal Academy of Arts in 1841, Pandemonium, picturing a scene from Paradise Lost, and The Celestial City and the River of Bliss were bought by civil and mechanical engineer Benjamin Hick. After Hick's death, in 1842, the two paintings were auctioned by Thomas Winstanley & Sons of Liverpool at the Exchange Gallery in Manchester, in February 1843. Pandæmonium and its frame designed by Martin can be seen at the Louvre.

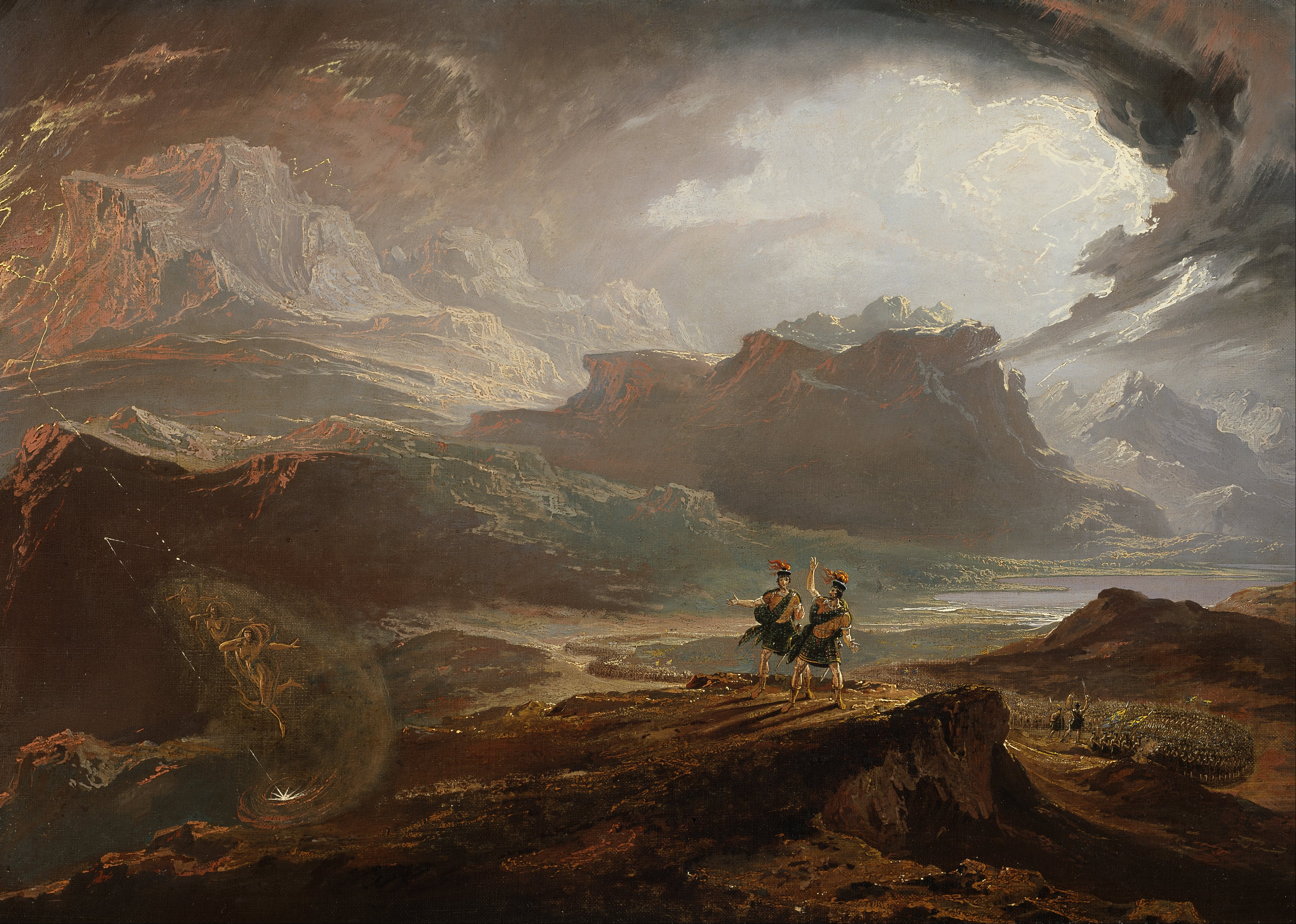
Macbeth (1820). Oil on canvas, 86 x 65.1 cm. Scottish National Gallery, Edinburgh

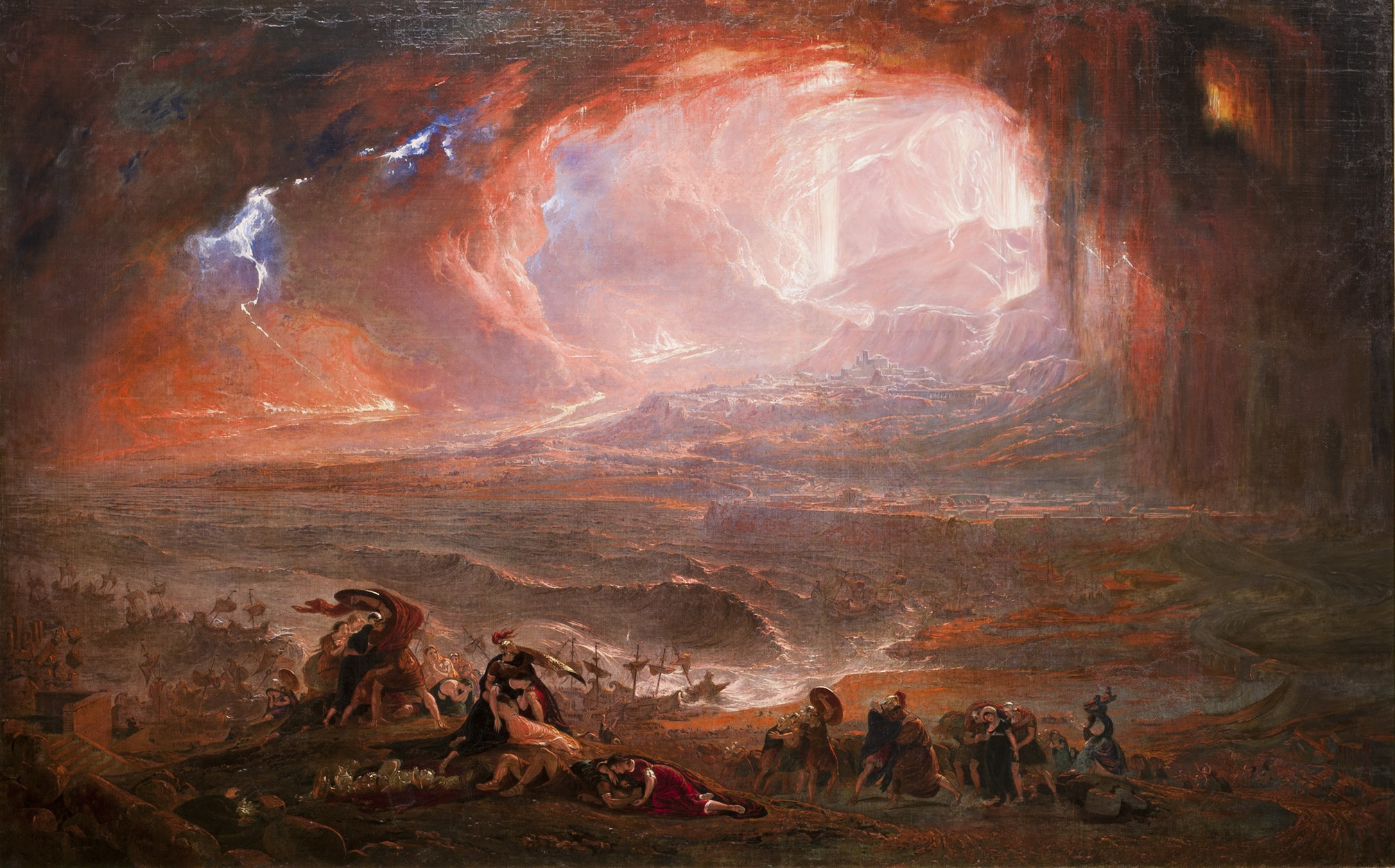
The Destruction of Pompeii and Herculaneum (c. 1821). Oil on canvas, 161.6 x 253 cm. Tate Britain, London

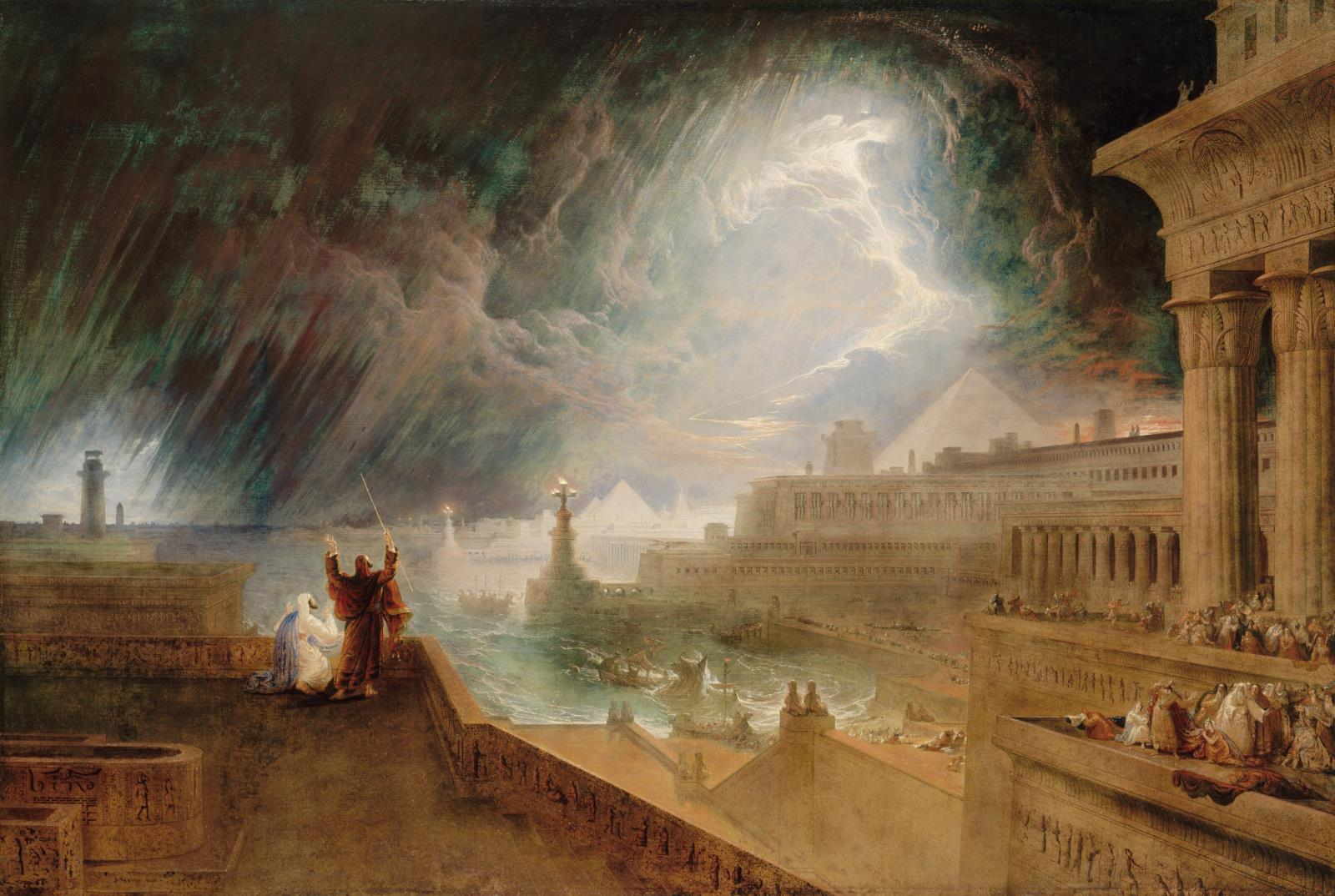
The Seventh Plague of Egypt (1823). Oil on canvas, 144.1 x 214 cm. Museum of Fine Arts, Boston

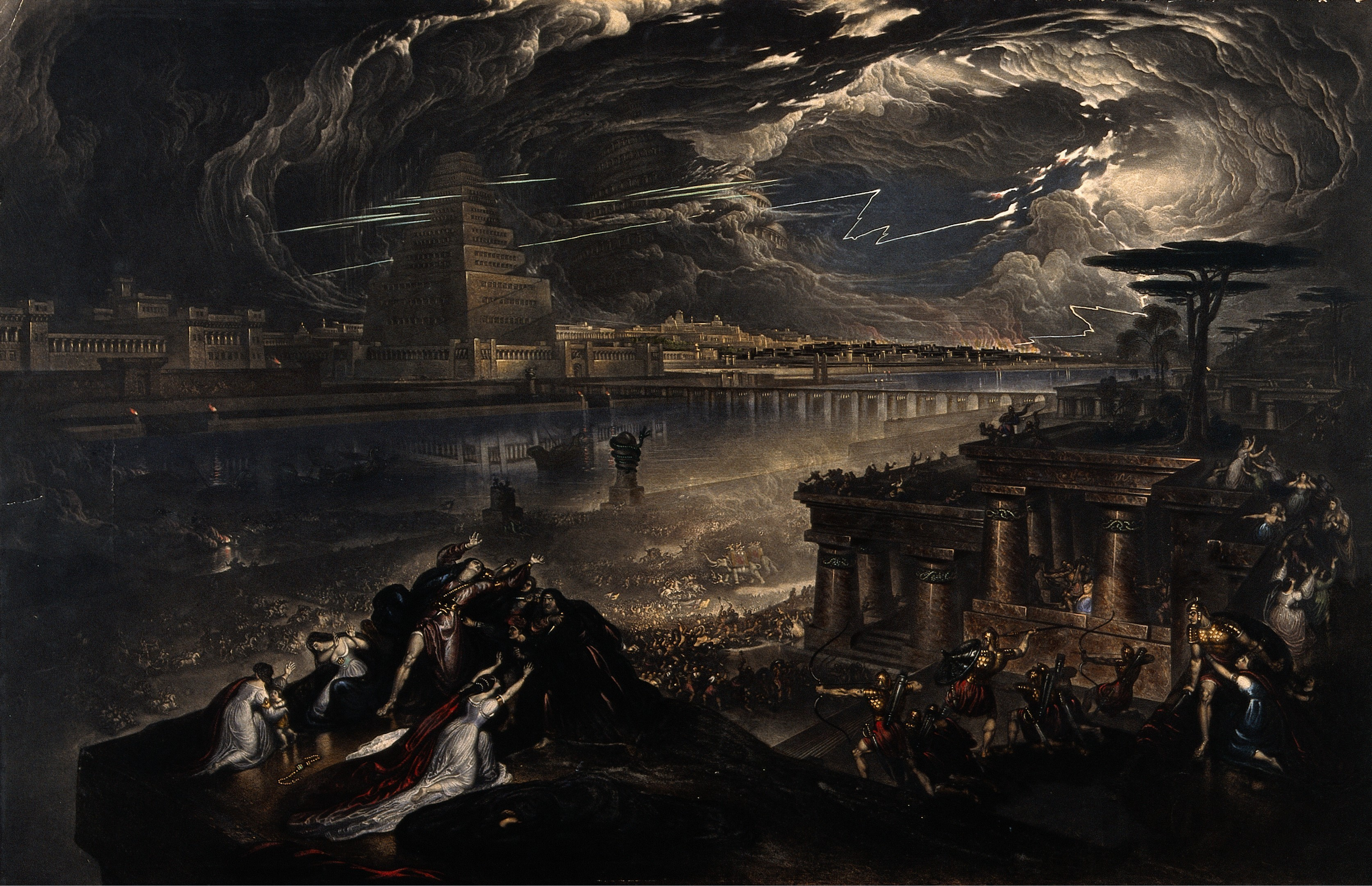
The Fall of Babylon; Cyrus the Great Defeating the Chaldean Army (1819). Oil on canvas, 155 × 244 cm. private collection, Italy

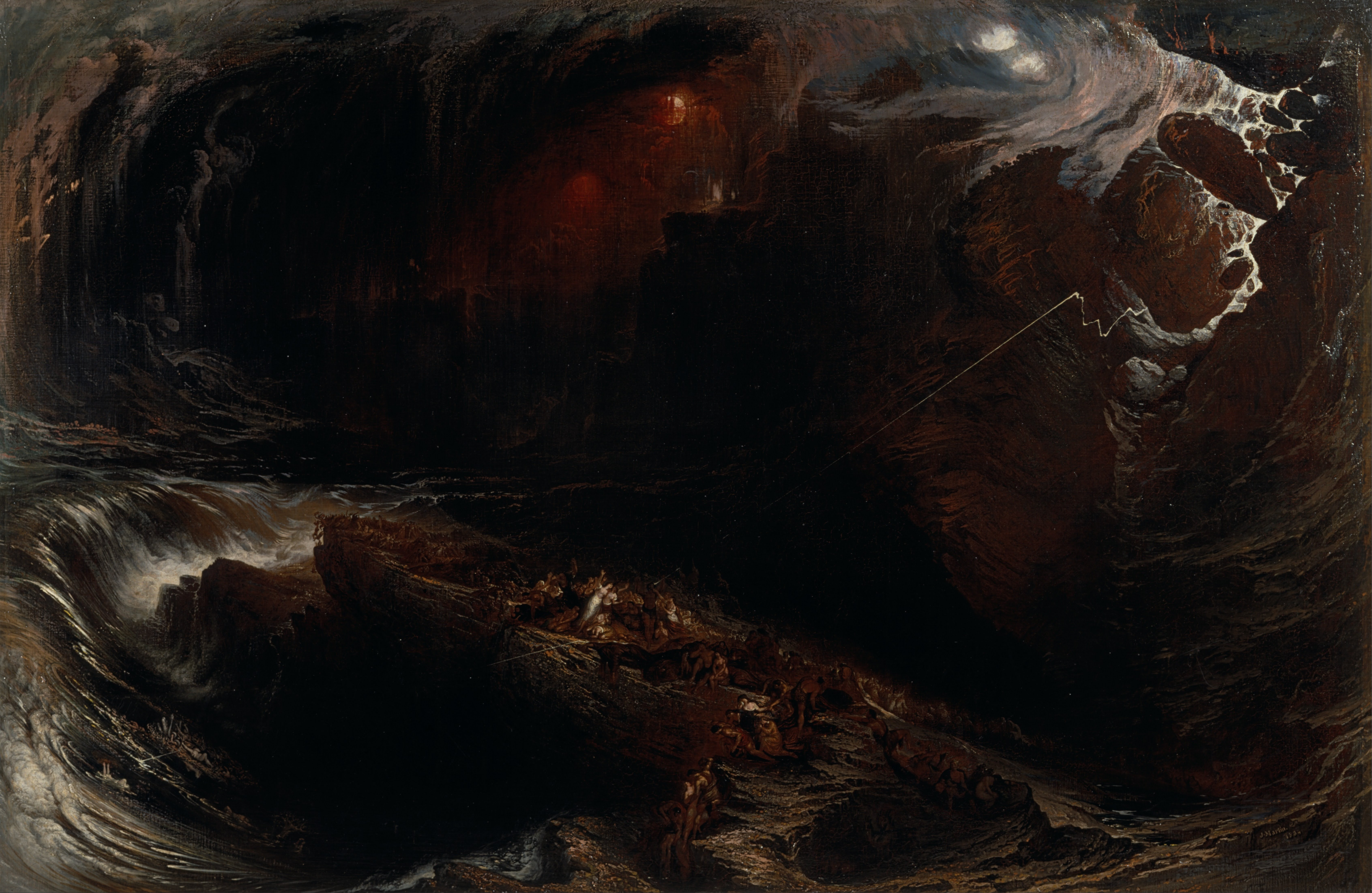
The Deluge (1834). Oil on canvas, 168.3 x 258.4 cm. Yale Center for British Art, New Haven, Connecticut

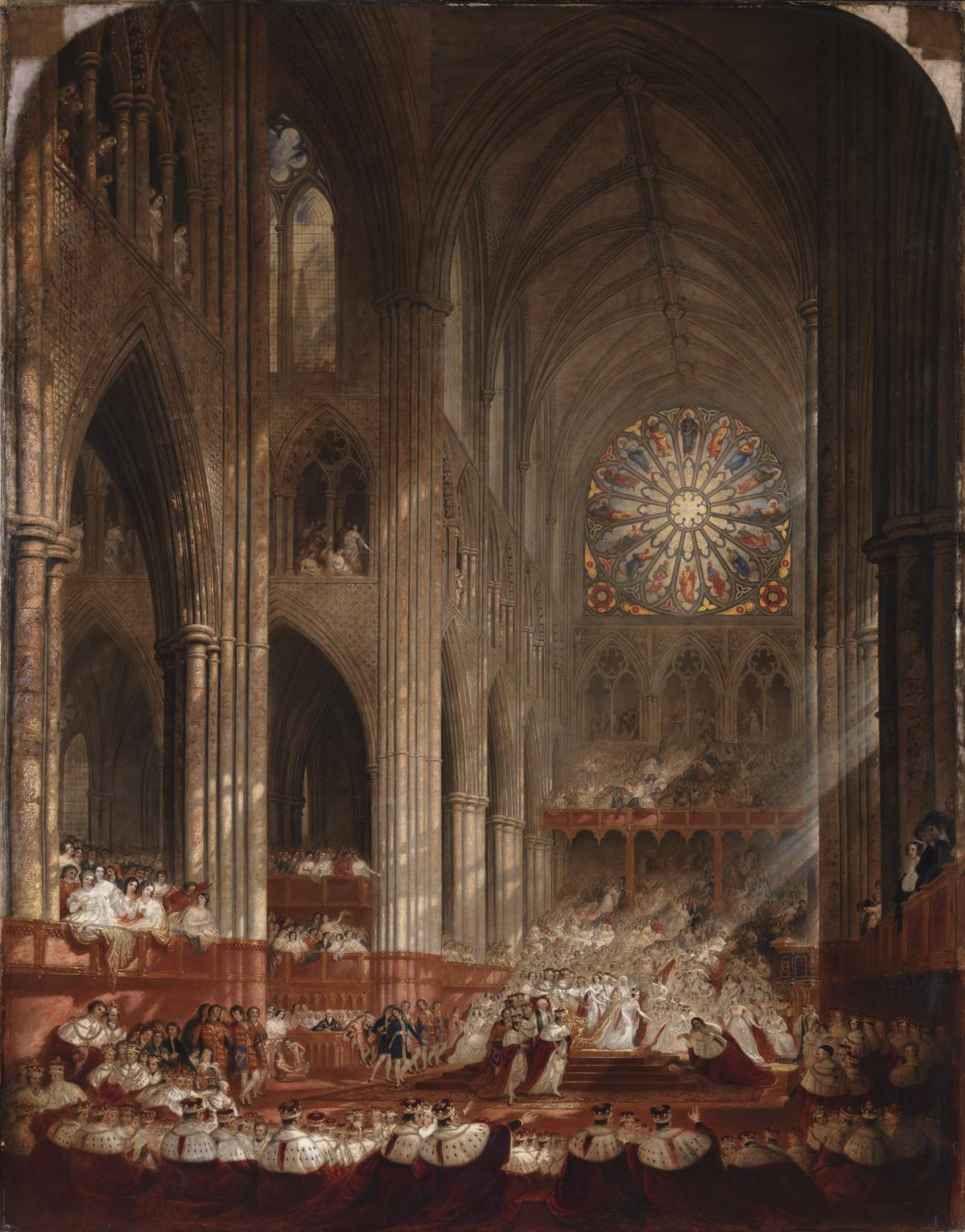
The Coronation of Queen Victoria (1839). Oil on canvas, 238.1 x 185.4 cm. Tate Britain, London

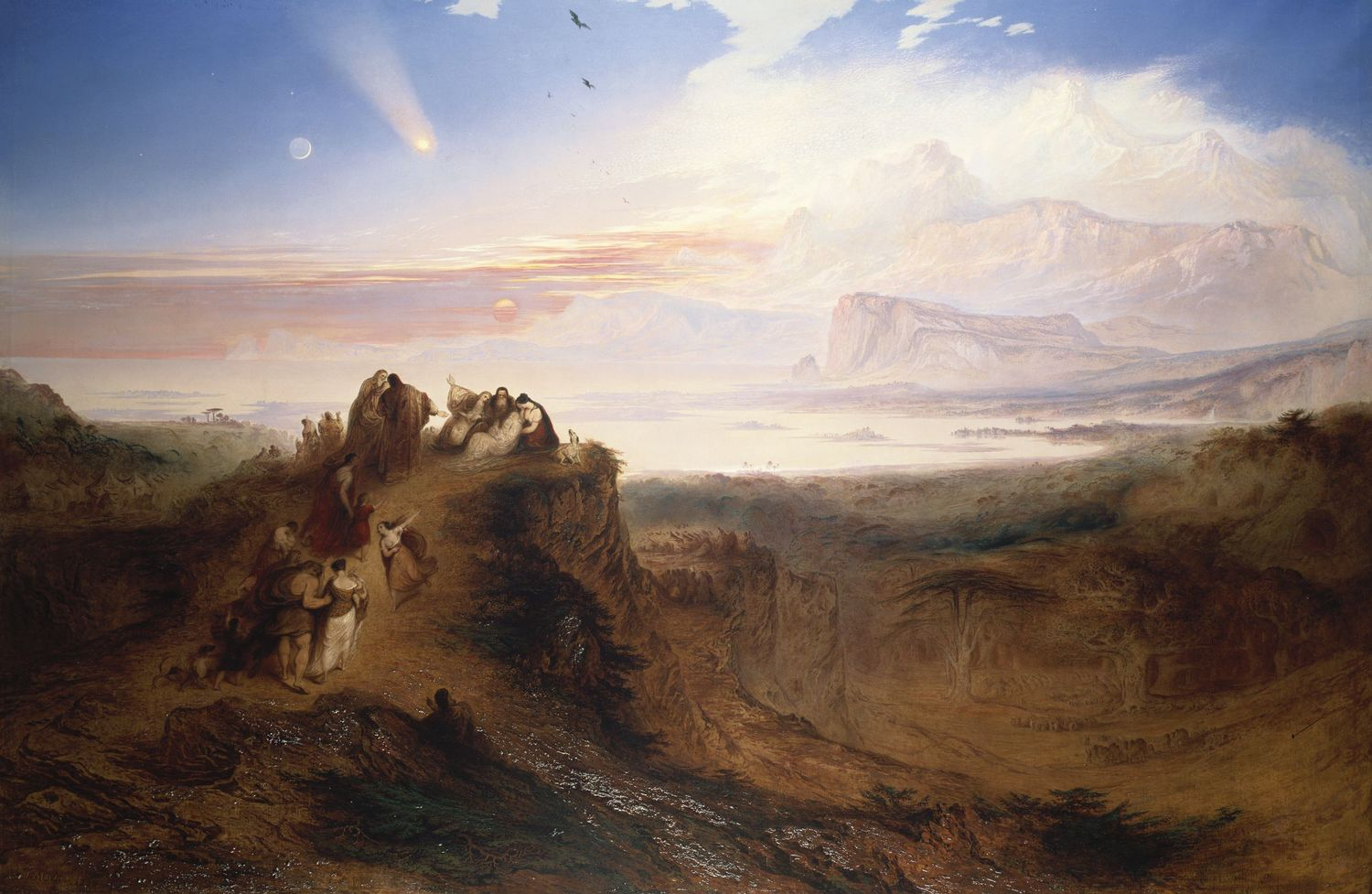
The Eve of the Deluge (1840). Oil on canvas, 143 x 218 cm. Windsor Castle, London

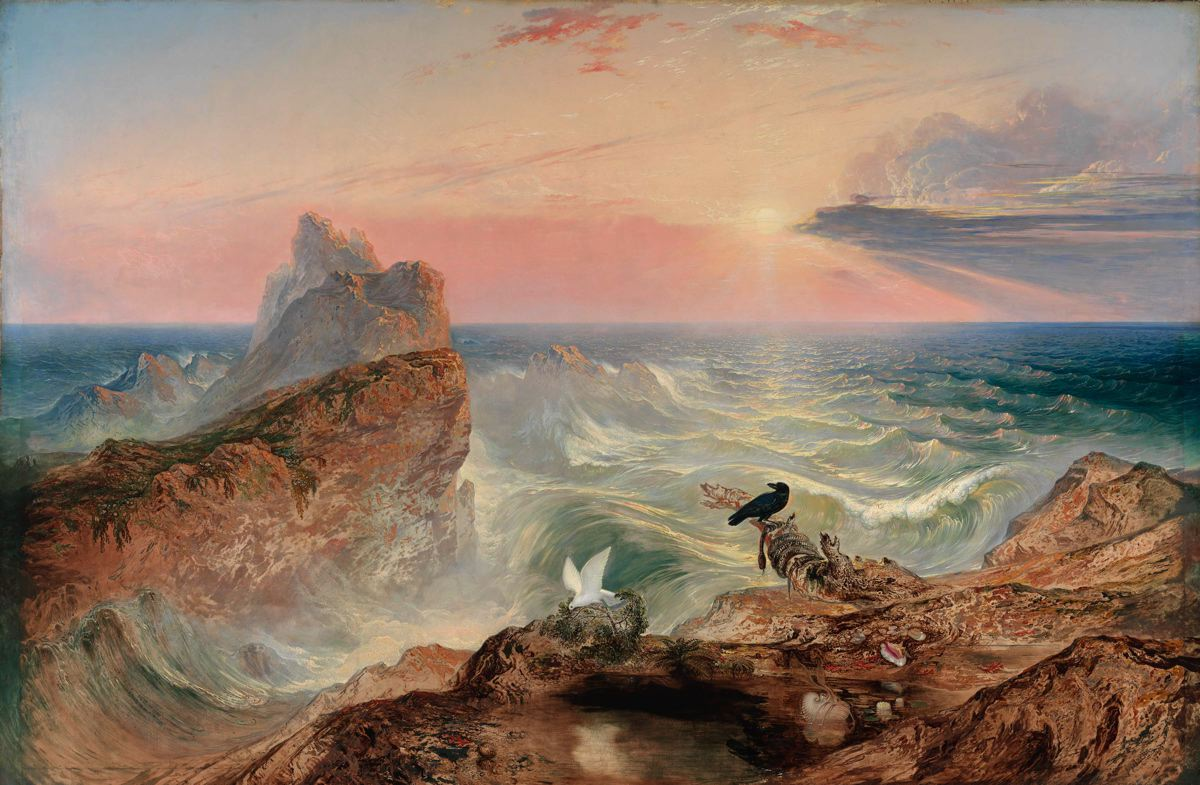
The Assuaging of the Waters (1840). Oil on canvas, 143.5 x 219.1 cm. California Palace of the Legion of Honor, San Francisco

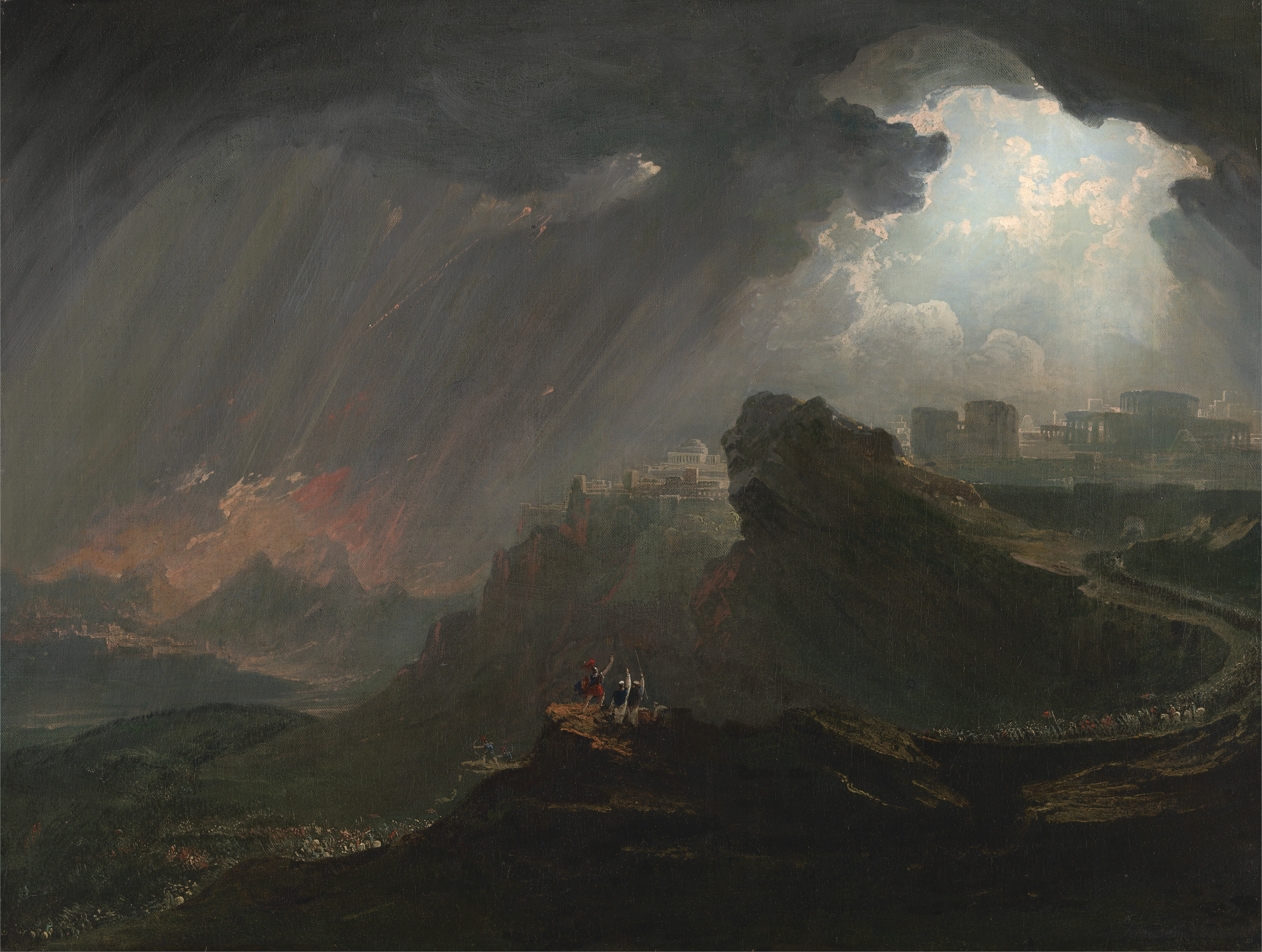
Joshua Commanding the Sun to Stand Still (c. 1840). Oil on canvas, 47.9 x 108.3 cm. National Gallery of Art, Washington, D.C.

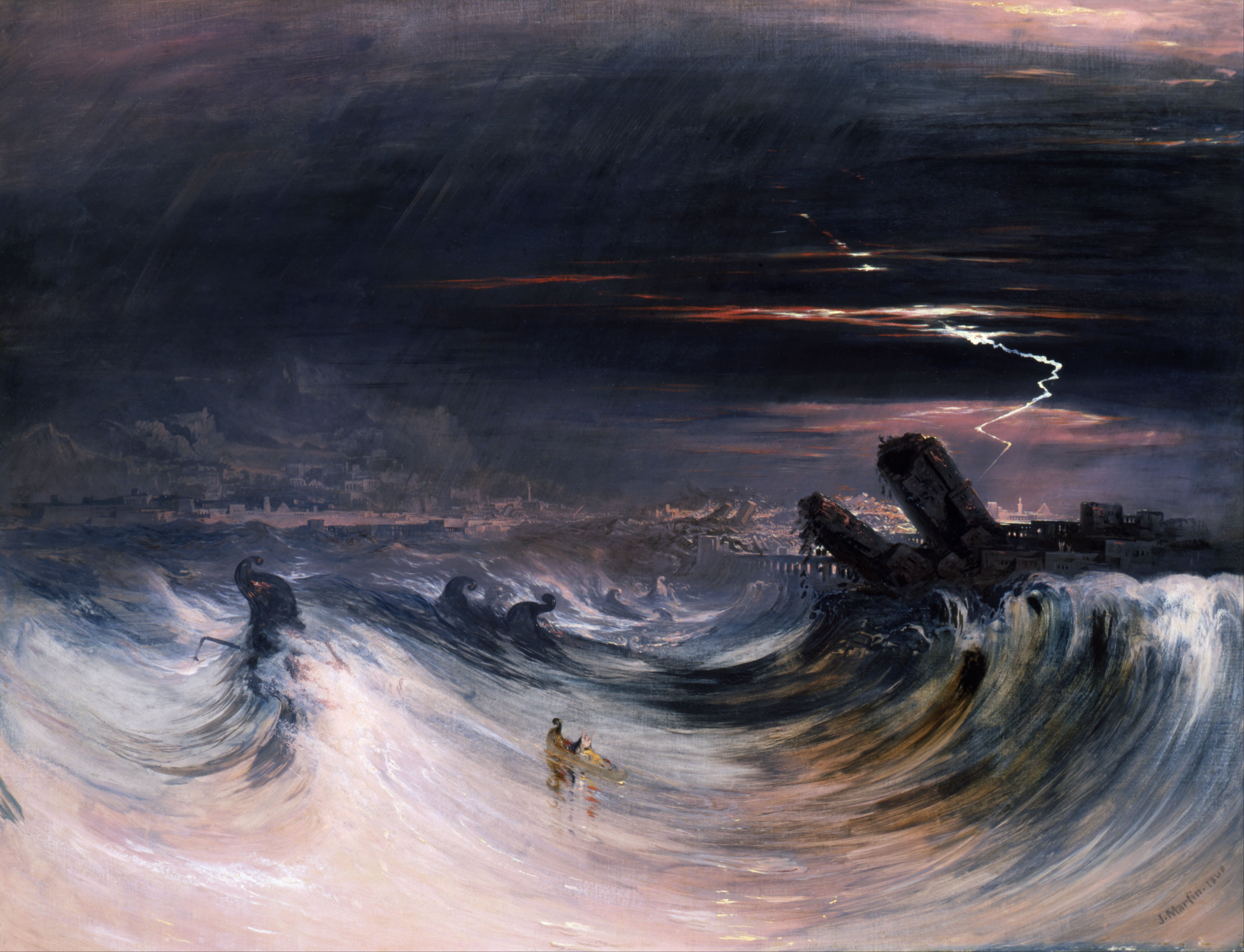
Destruction of Tyre (1840). Oil on canvas, 83.8 x 109.5 cm. Toledo Museum of Art, Ohio

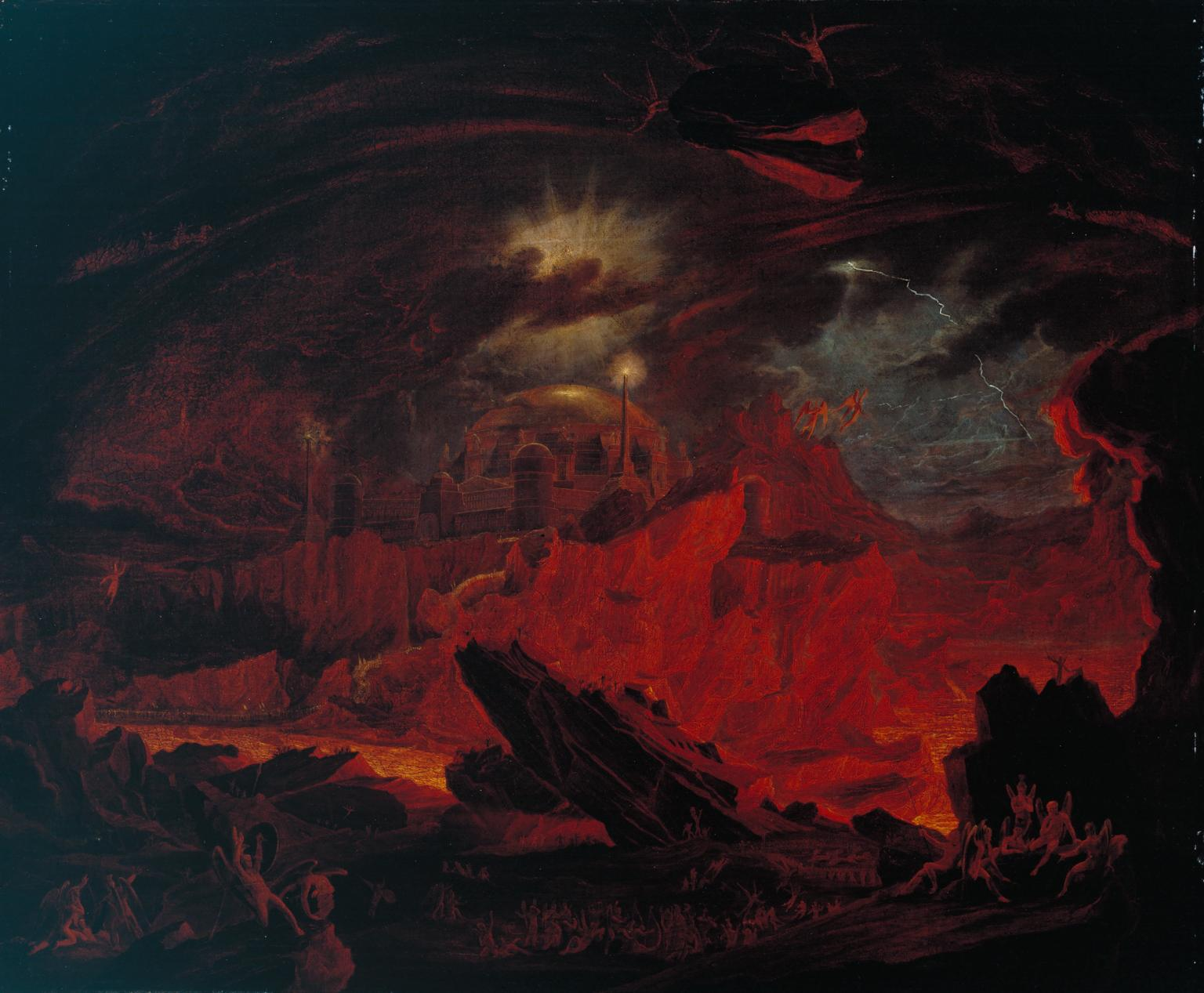
The Fallen Angels Entering Pandemonium (1841). Oil on canvas, 61 x 76 cm. Tate Britain, London

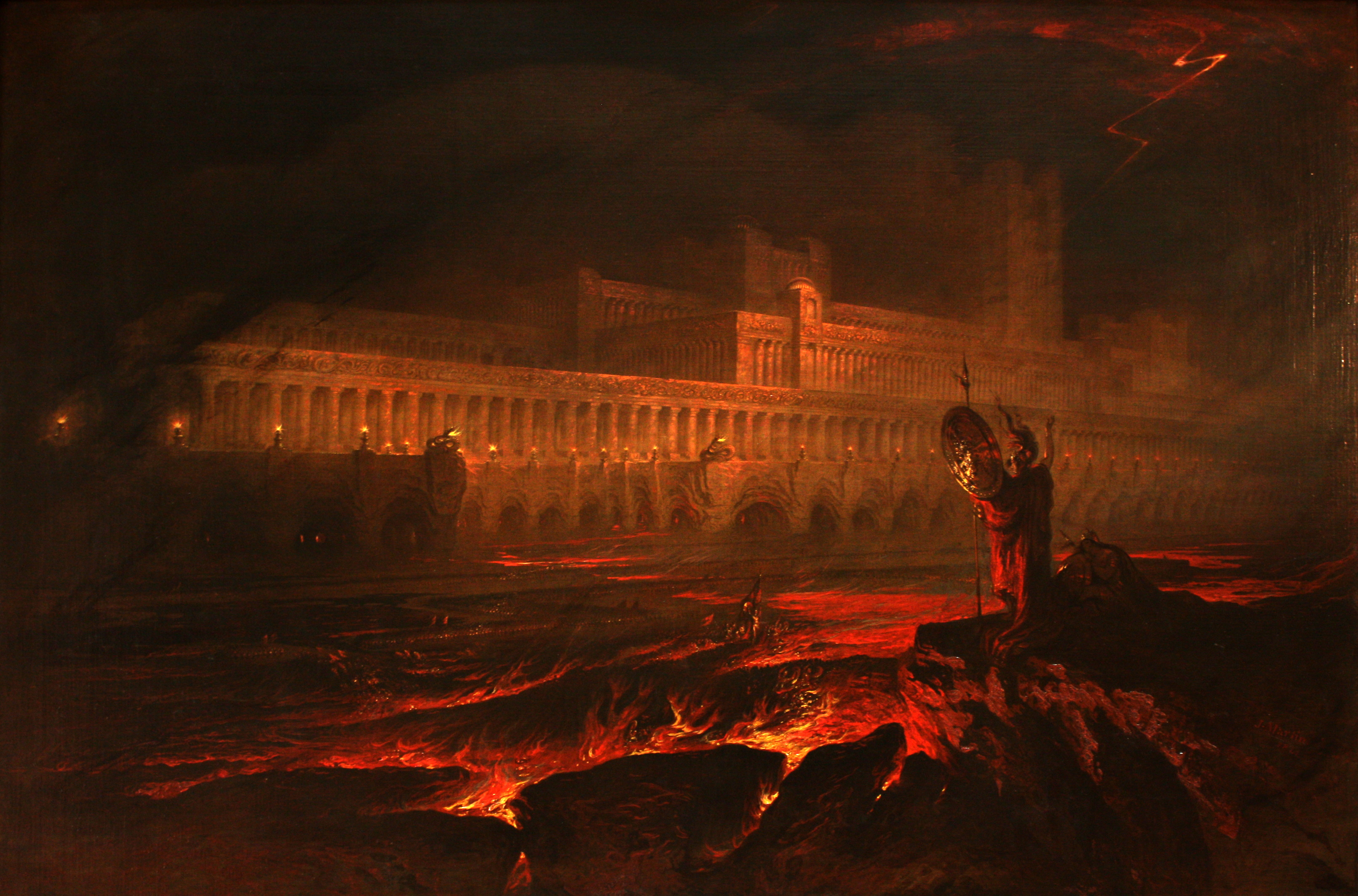
Pandemonium (1841). Oil on canvas, 123 x 185 cm. Louvre, Paris

== Engravings ==
In addition to being a painter, John Martin was a mezzotint engraver. For significant periods of his life, he earned more from his engravings than his paintings. In 1823, Martin was commissioned by Samuel Prowett to illustrate John Milton's Paradise Lost, for which he was paid 2,000 guineas. Before the first 24 engravings were completed he was paid a further 1500 guineas for a second set of 24 engravings on smaller plates. Some of the more notable prints include Pandæmonium and Satan Presiding at the Infernal Council, remarkable for the science fiction element visible in the depicted architecture, and arguably his most dramatic composition Bridge over Chaos. Prowett issued 4 separate editions of the engravings in monthly instalments, the first appearing on 20 March 1825 and the last in 1827. Later, inspired by Prowett's venture, between 1831 and 1835 Martin published his own illustrations to accompany the Old Testament but the project was a serious drain on his resources and not very profitable. He sold his remaining stock to Charles Tilt who republished them in a folio album in 1838 and in a smaller format in 1839.

=== Engravings and mezzotints ===
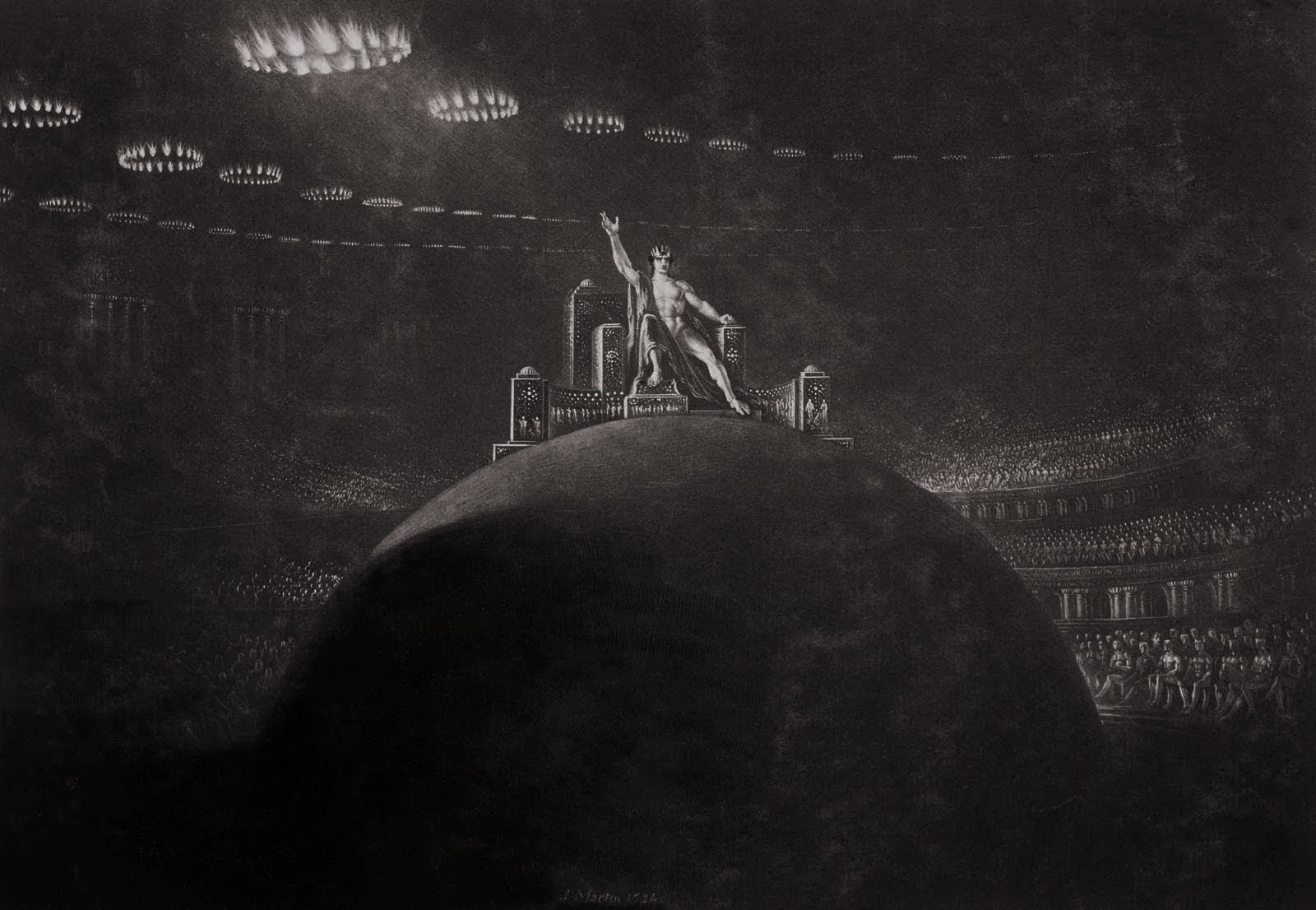
Satan Presiding at the Infernal Council (1824). Mezzotint and engraving, size unknown. Victoria and Albert Museum, London

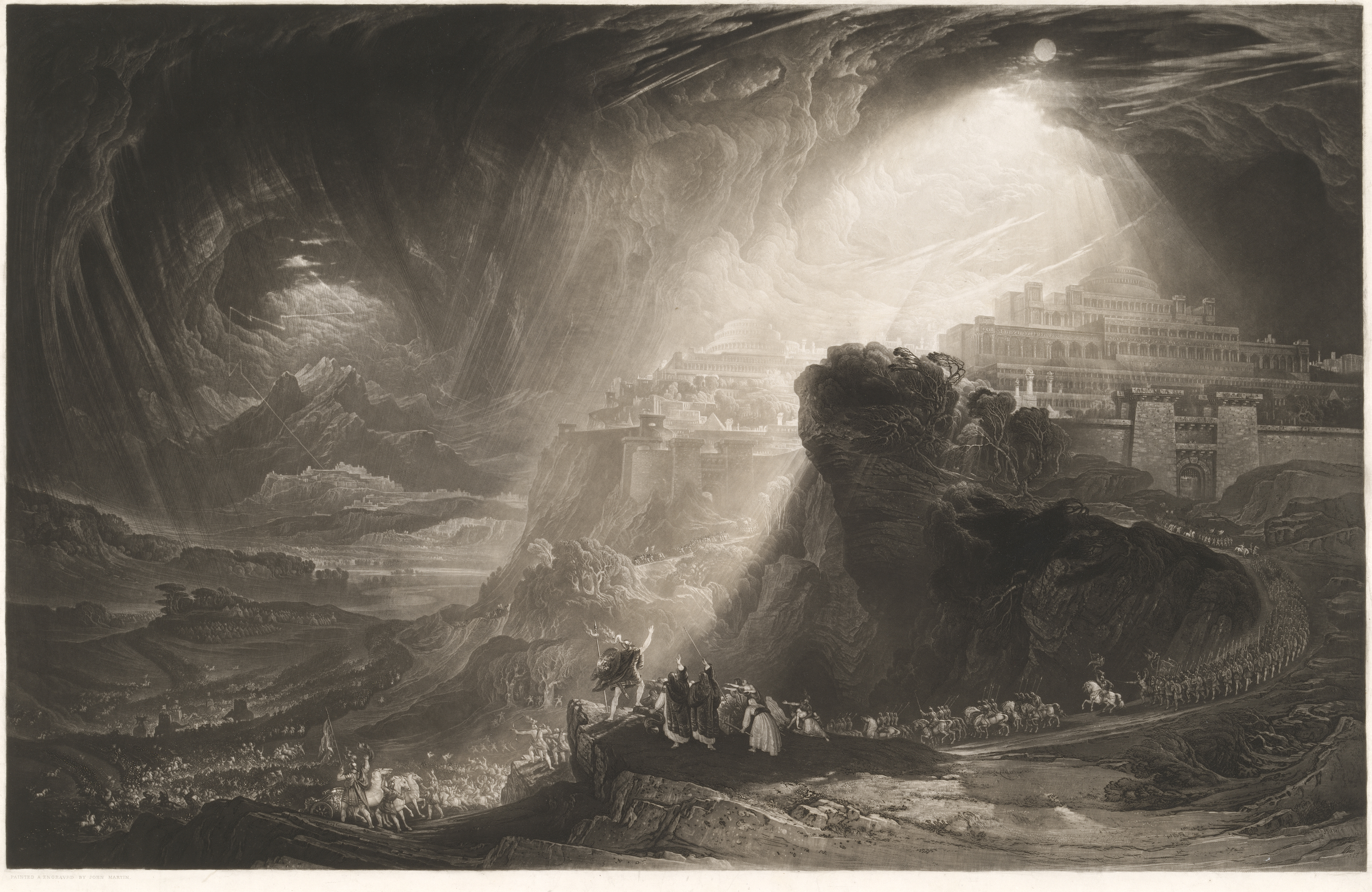
Joshua Commanding the Sun to Stand Still (1827). Mezzotint and etching, plate, 57.1 x 77.8 cm. National Gallery of Art, Washington D.C.

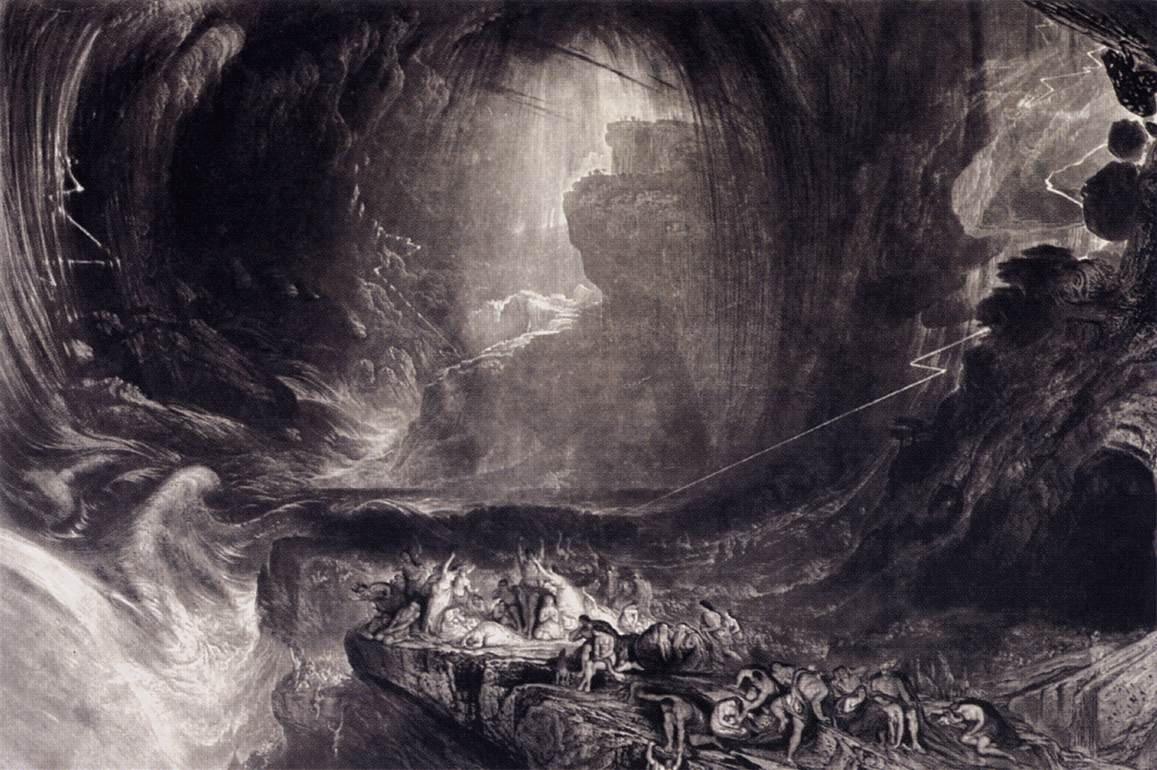
The Evening of the Deluge (1828). Mezzotint and engraving, 59.7 x 81.7 cm. Victoria and Albert Museum, London

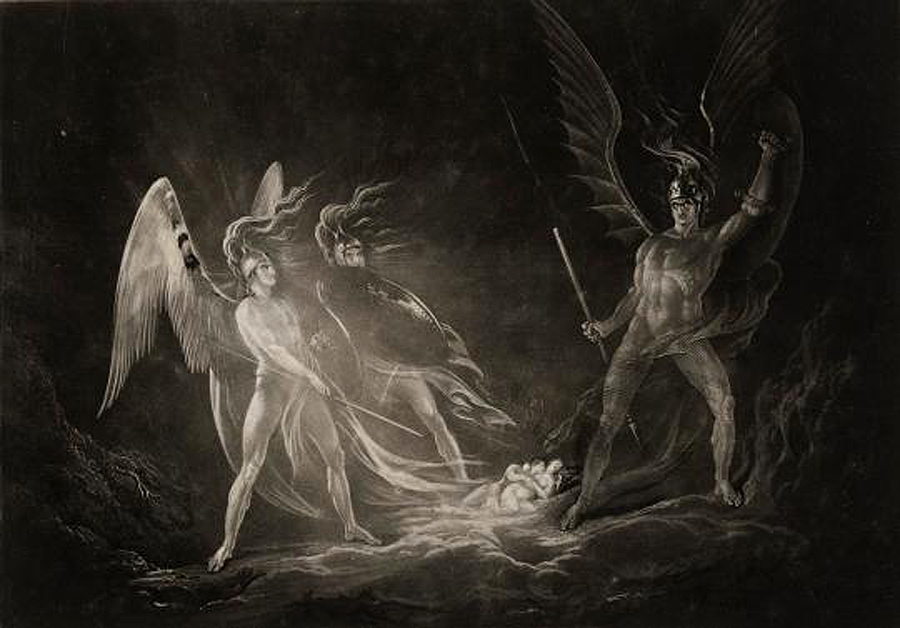
Eve's Dream, Satan Aroused, from Paradise Lost (1824–1827) mezzotint, plate, 14 × 20.2 cm. Museum of Fine Arts, Houston

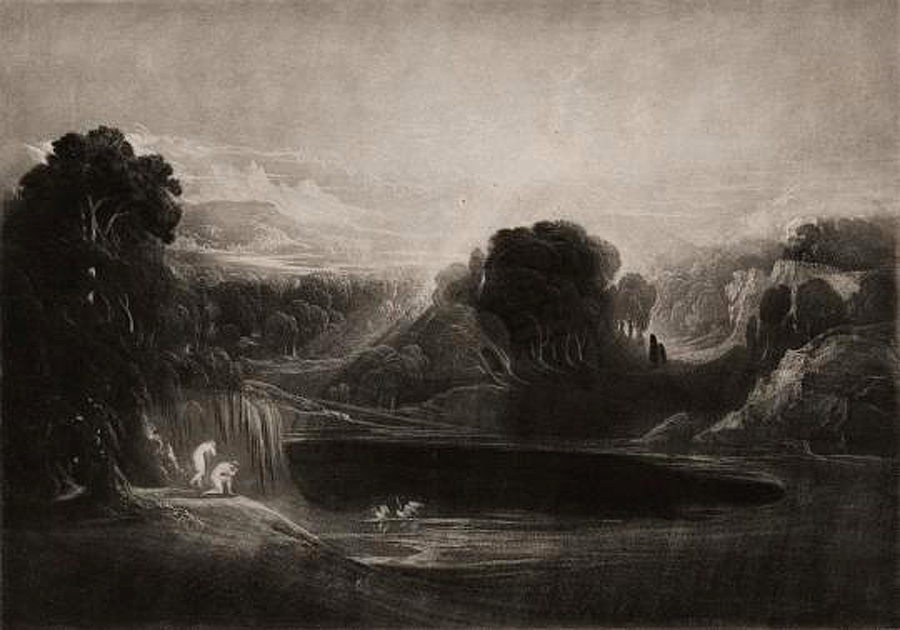
Paradise, Adam and Eve, the Morning Hymn, from Paradise Lost (1824–1827). Mezzotint, plate 14.3 × 20.5 cm. Museum of Fine Arts, Houston

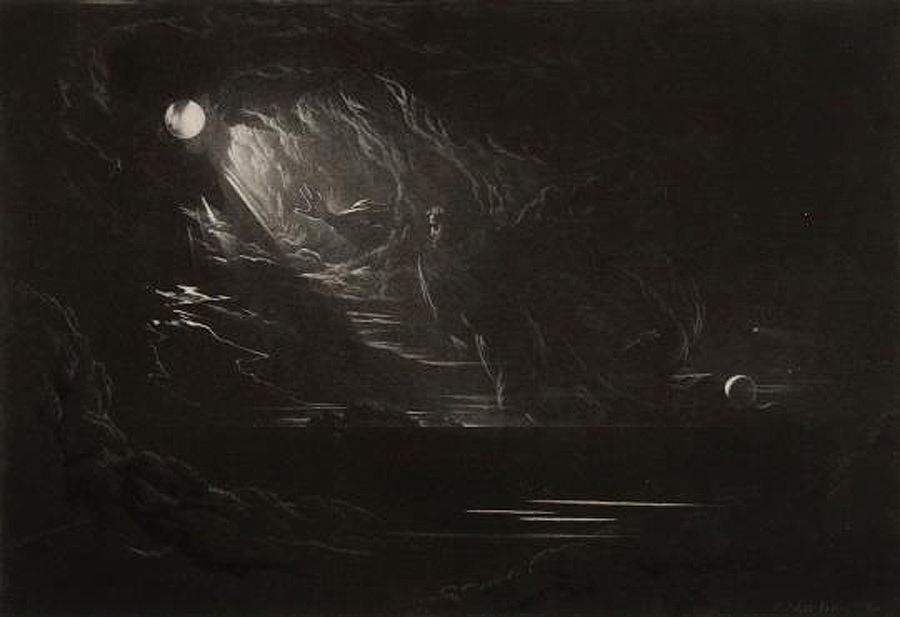
The Creation of Light, from Paradise Lost (1824–1827). Mezzotint, plate, 13.3 × 19.7 cm. Museum of Fine Arts, Houston

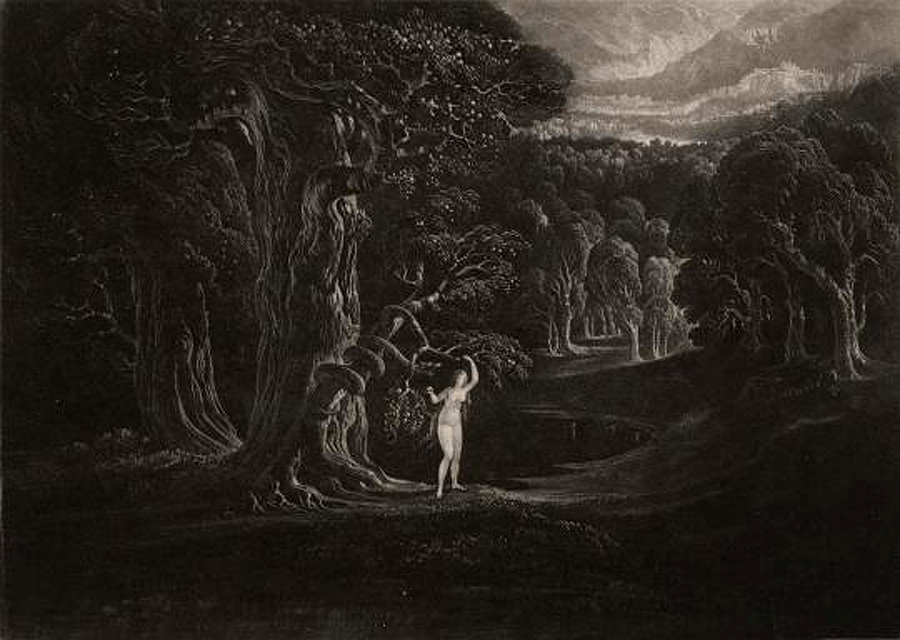
Satan Tempting Eve, from Paradise Lost (1824–1827). Mezzotint, plate, 14.3 × 20 cm. Museum of Fine Arts, Houston

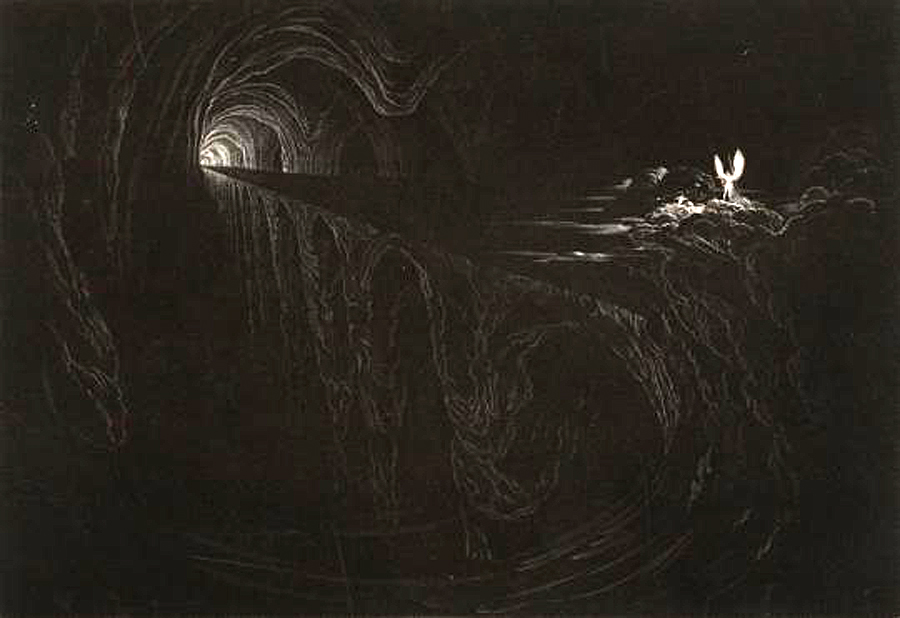
Bridge of Chaos, from Paradise Lost (1824–1827). Mezzotint, plate, 14.3 × 21 cm. Museum of Fine Arts, Houston

=== Works on paper ===
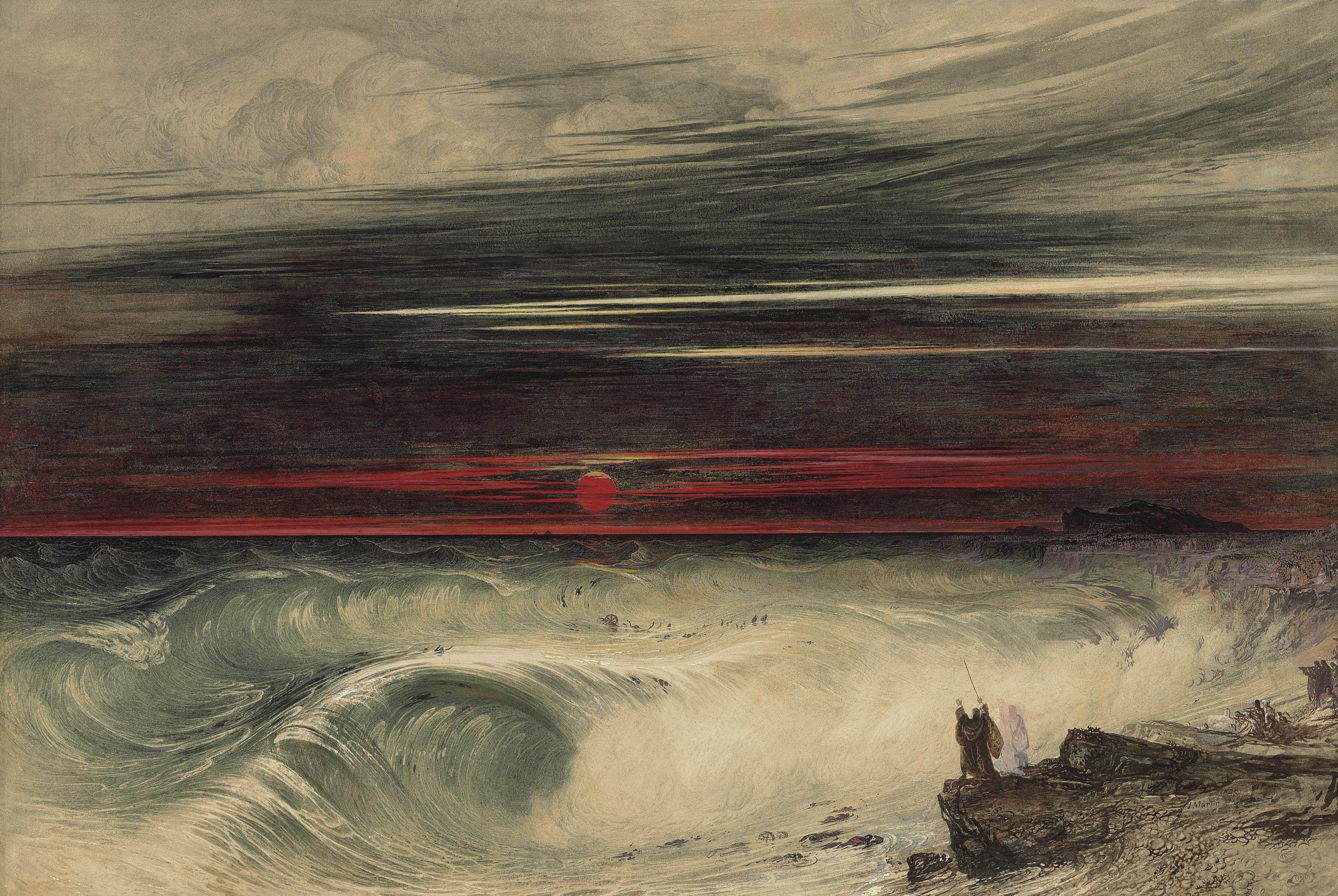
The Destruction of Pharaoh's Host (1836). Pencil, watercolour with gum arabic, 58.4 x 85.7 cm. J. Paul Getty Museum, Los Angeles

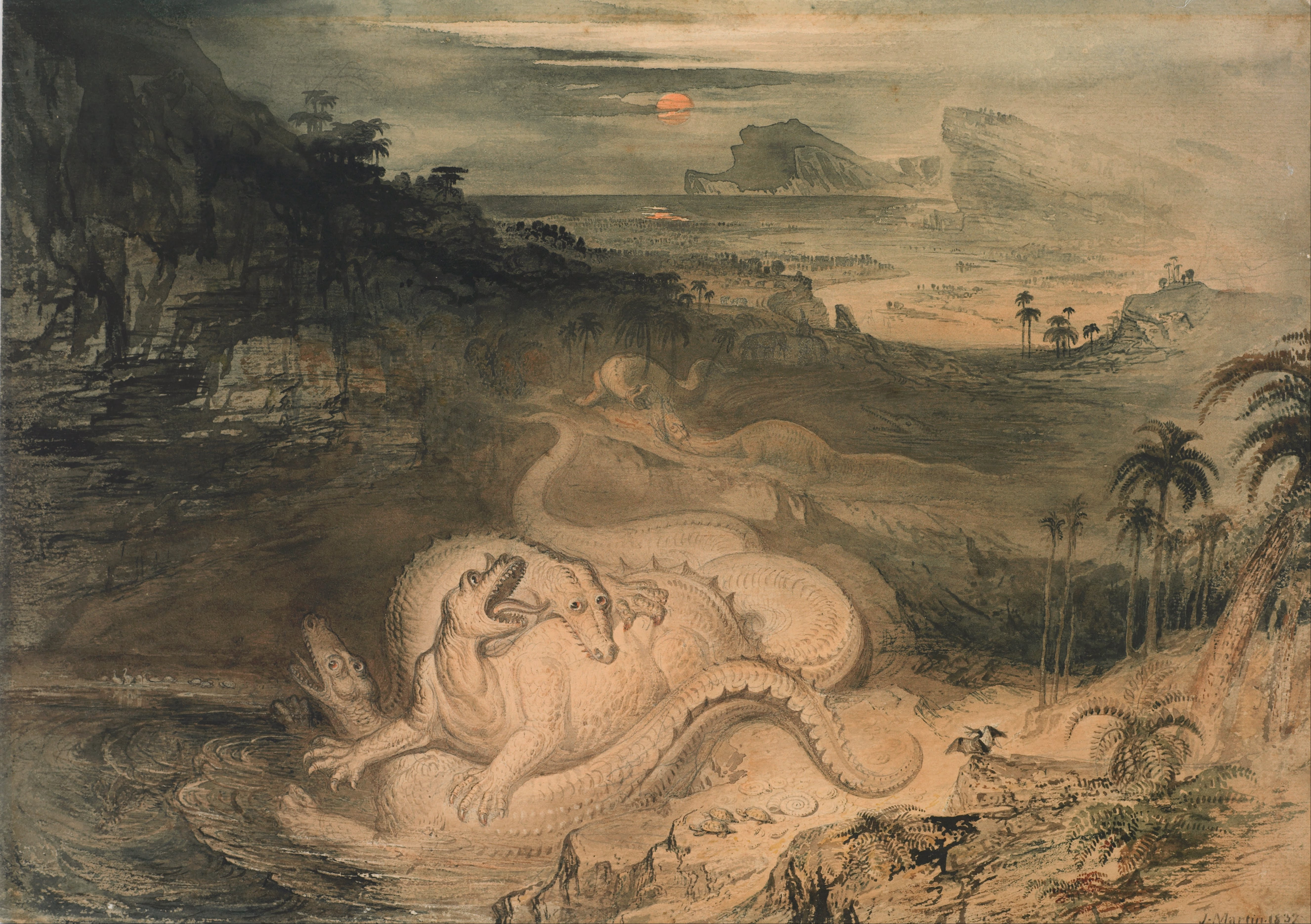
The Country of the Iguanodon (1837). Watercolour on paper, 30.2 x 42.4 cm. Museum of New Zealand Te Papa Tongarewa, Wellington

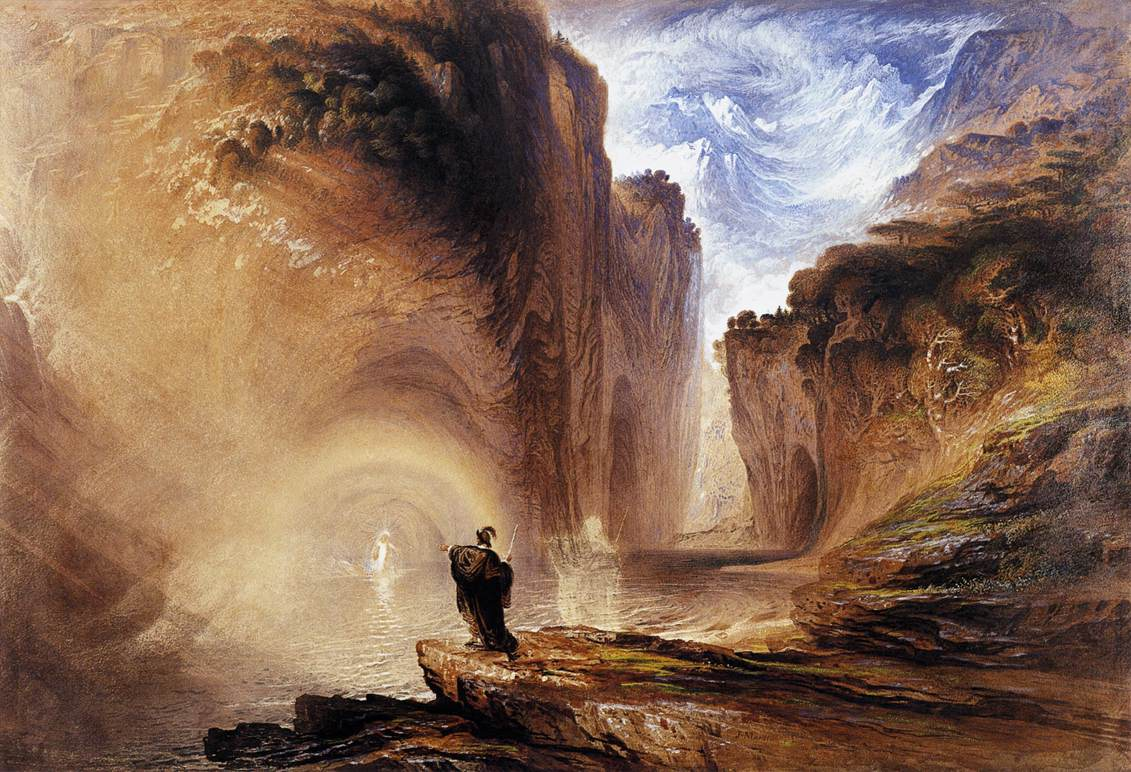
Manfred and the Alpine Witch (1837). Watercolour, 38.8 x 55.8 cm. The Whitworth, Manchester

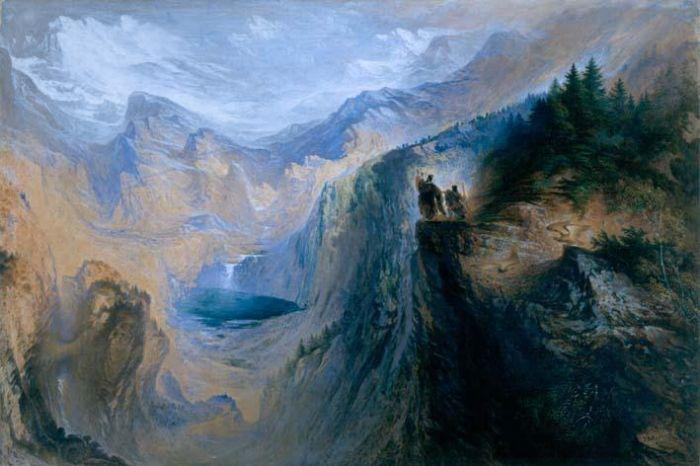
Manfred On The Jungfrau, inspired by Byron's Manfred (1837). Watercolour, gouache and gum arabic, dimensions unknown. Birmingham Museums Trust, Birmingham

== Later life ==
His profile was raised further in February 1829 when his elder brother, non-conformist Jonathan Martin, deliberately set fire to York Minster. The fire caused extensive damage and the scene was likened by an onlooker to Martin's work, oblivious to the fact that it had more to do with him than it initially seemed. Jonathan Martin's defence at his trial was paid for with John Martin's money. Jonathan Martin, known as "Mad Martin", was ultimately found guilty but was spared the hangman's noose on the grounds of insanity.

Martin from about 1827 to 1828 had turned away from painting, and became involved with many engineering plans and inventions. He developed a fascination with solving London's water and sewage problems, and published various pamphlets and plans dealing with the metropolitan water supply, sewage, dock and railway systems. His ideas involved the creation of the Thames embankment, containing a central drainage system. His plans were visionary, and formed the basis for later engineers' designs. His 1834 plans for London's sewerage system anticipated by some 25 years the 1859 proposals of Joseph Bazalgette to create intercepting sewers complete with walkways along both banks of the River Thames. He also made plans for railway schemes, including lines on both banks of the Thames. The plans, along with ideas for "laminating timber", lighthouses, and draining islands, all survive. Martin's upbringing near one of Britain's most active centers of coal mining led to a life-long interest in the infrastructure and safety of mining.

Debt and family pressures, including the suicide of his nephew (Jonathan's son Richard), brought on depression, which reached its worst in 1838.

From 1839 Martin's fortunes recovered and he exhibited many works during the 1840s. During the last four years of his life Martin was engaged in a trilogy of large paintings of biblical subjects: The Last Judgment, The Great Day of His Wrath, and The Plains of Heaven, of which two were bequeathed to Tate Britain in 1974, the other having been acquired for the Tate some years earlier. They were completed in 1853, just before the stroke which paralysed his right side. He was never to recover and died on 17 February 1854, at Douglas, Isle of Man. He is buried in Kirk Braddan cemetery. Major exhibitions of his works are still mounted.

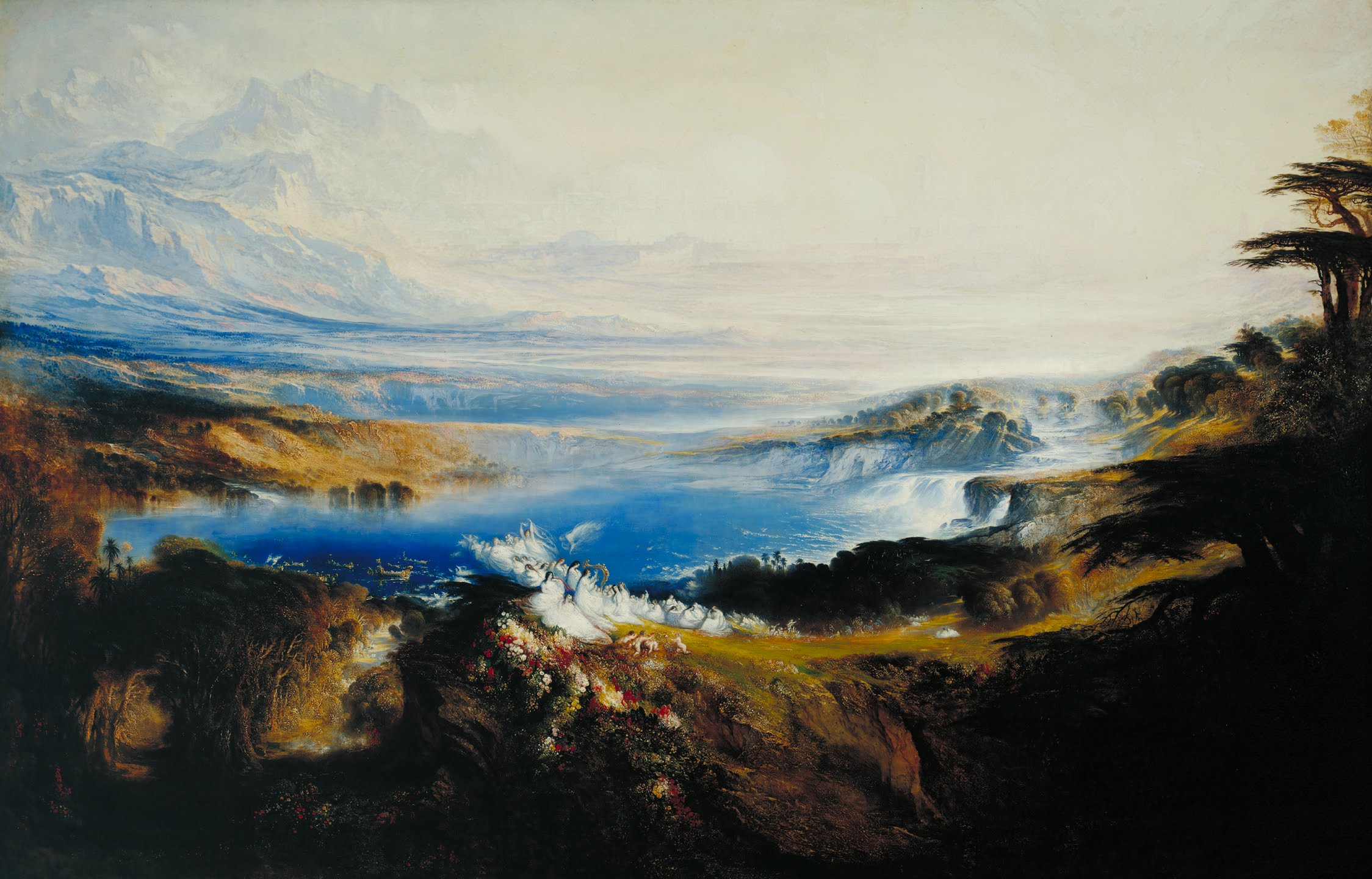
The Plains of Heaven (c. 1851). Oil on canvas, 198 x 306 cm. Tate Britain, London

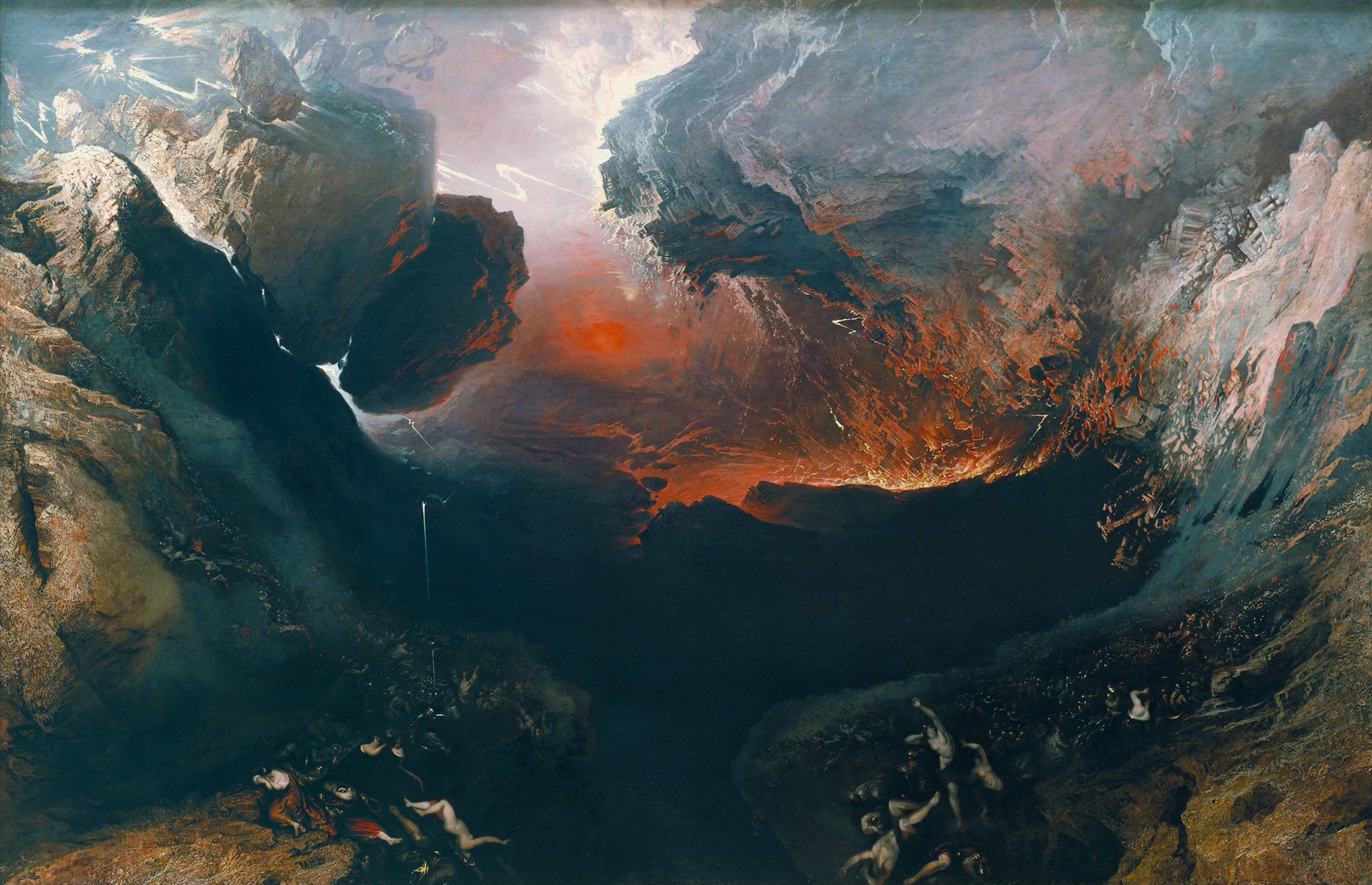
The Great Day of His Wrath (1851). Oil on canvas, 196.5 x 303 cm. Tate Britain, London

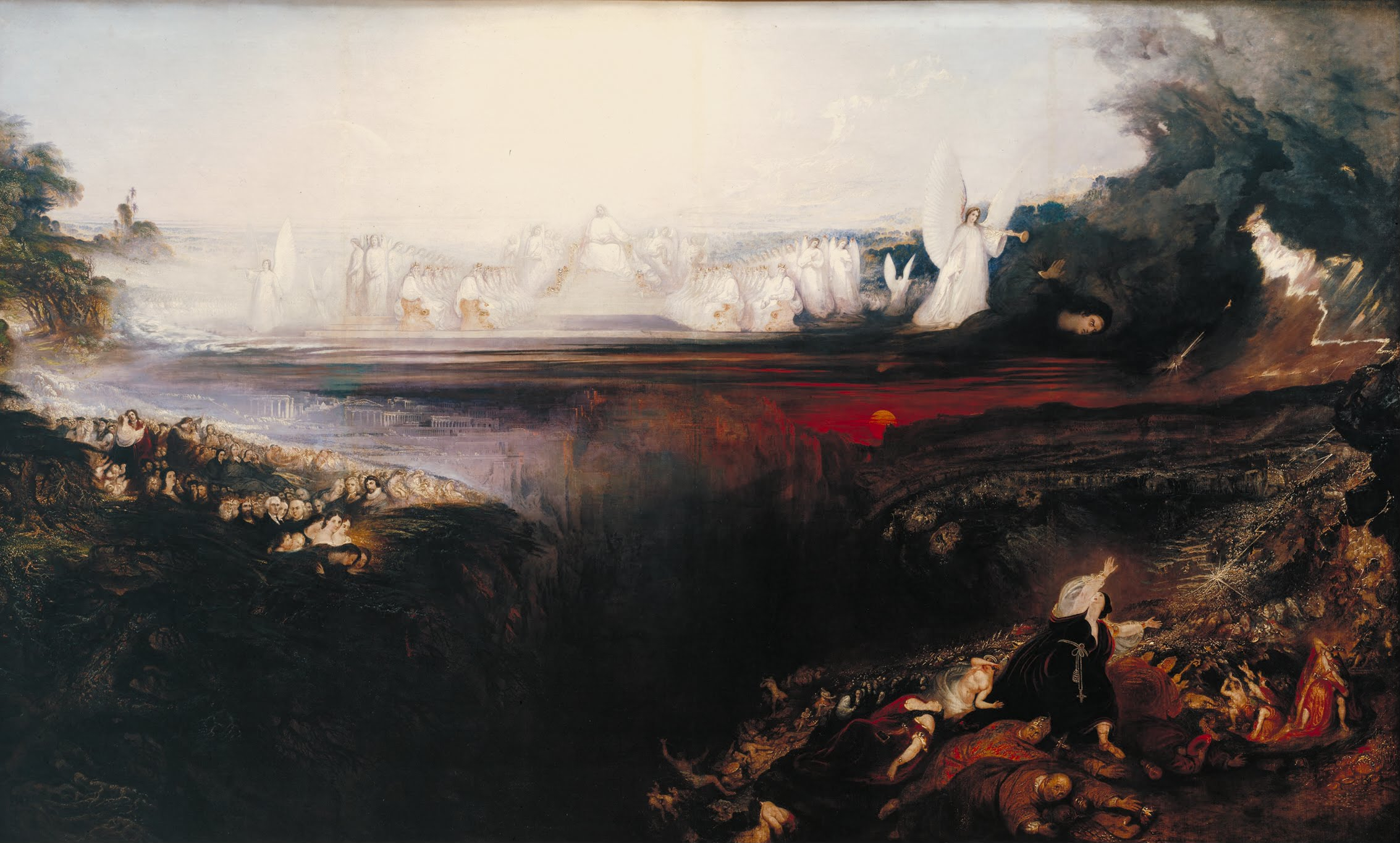
The Last Judgment (1853). Oil on canvas, 196 x 325 cm. Tate Britain, London

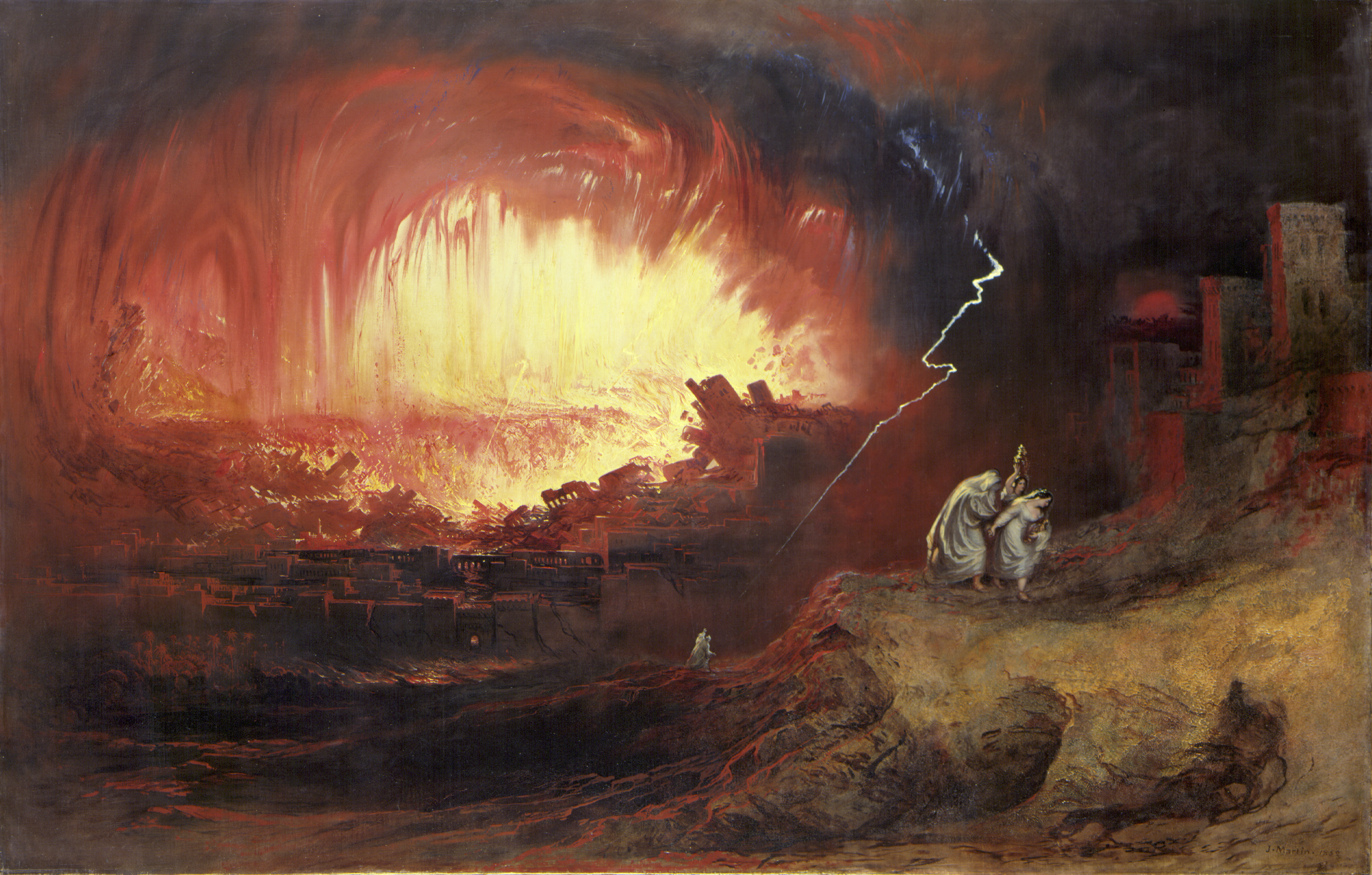
The Destruction Of Sodom And Gomorrah (1852). Oil on canvas, 136.3 x 212.3 cm. Laing Art Gallery, Newcastle upon Tyne

== Legacy ==
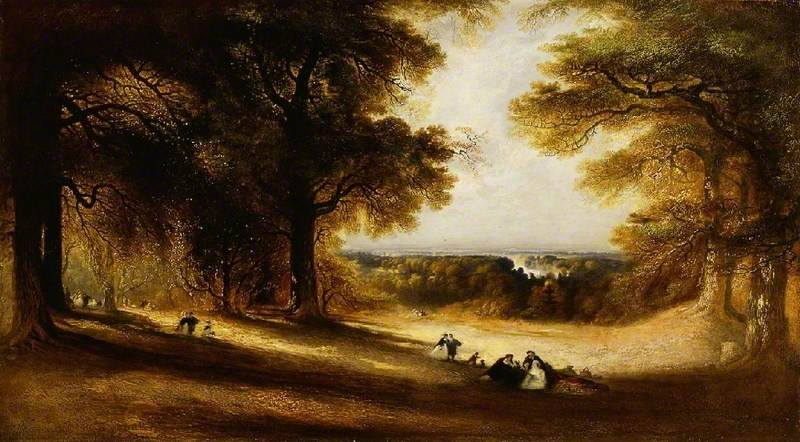
View in Richmond Park (1850). Oil on paper, 50.8 x 91.5 cm. Fitzwilliam Museum, Cambridge

Martin enjoyed immense popularity and his influence survived. One of his followers was Thomas Cole, founder of American landscape painting. Others whose imaginations were fired by him included Ralph Waldo Emerson and the Brontës – a print of Belshazzar's Feast hung on the parlour wall of the Brontë parsonage in Haworth, and his works were to have a direct influence upon the writings of Charlotte and her sisters, who as children played with a model of him. Martin's fantasy architecture influenced the Glasstown and Angria of the Brontë juvenilia, where he himself appears as Edward de Lisle of Verdopolis.

Martin enjoyed a European reputation and influence. Heinrich Heine wrote of the music of Hector Berlioz that "It makes me see visions of fabulous empires and many a cloud-capped, impossible wonder. Its magical strains conjure up Babylon, the hanging gardens of Semiramis, the marvels of Nineveh, the mighty constructions of Mizraim, as we see them in the pictures of the English painter Martin."

Martin's work influenced the Pre-Raphaelite Brotherhood – especially Dante Gabriel Rossetti, and several generations of movie-makers, from D. W. Griffith, who borrowed his Babylon from Martin, to Cecil B. DeMille and George Lucas. Writers like Rider Haggard, Jules Verne, and H. G. Wells were influenced by his concept of the sublime. The French Romantic movement, in both art and literature, was inspired by him. Much Victorian railway architecture was copied from his motifs, including his friend Brunel's Clifton Suspension Bridge. A number of Martin's engineering plans for London which included a circular connecting railway, though they failed to be built in his lifetime, came to fruition many years later. This would have pleased him inordinately – he is known to have exclaimed to his son, Leopold, that he would rather have been an engineer than painter.

Like some other popular artists, Martin fell victim to changes in fashion and public taste. His grandiose visions seemed theatrical and outmoded to the mid-Victorians, and after Martin died his works became neglected and gradually forgotten. "Few artists have been subject to such posthumous extremes of critical fortune, for in the 1930s his vast paintings fetched only a pound or two, while today they are valued at many thousands."

In the 1930s and 1940s his work again came to be appreciated. Connections between his dramatic style and the arts and culture of the historically charged post-war period in Britain has been assessed by Anguix-Vilches who sees post-World War II enthusiasm for depictions of the Apocalypse as allowing Martin's work to survive.

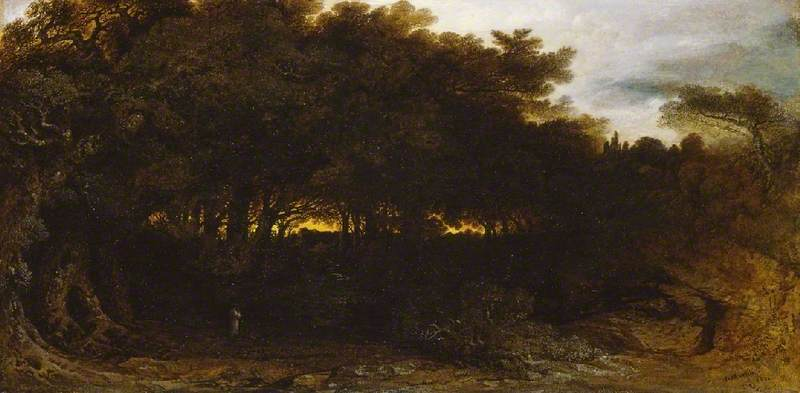
Twilight in the Woodlands (1850). Oil on canvas, dimensions unknown. Fitzwilliam Museum, Cambridge

A number of Martin's works survive in public collections: the Laing Art Gallery in Newcastle – which also holds his famous "black cabinet" of projects in progress; Tate Britain, the Victoria & Albert Museum, the Louvre, the National Gallery of Art in Washington, D.C., Yale Center for British Art, Saint Louis Art Museum and elsewhere in the USA. The RIBA holds many of his engineering pamphlets. There are letters in private collections and at Queen Mary College in London. John Martin wrote two autobiographies, the first an article in The Athenaeum of 14 June 1834, page 459 and the most extensive in The Illustrated London News, 17 March 1849, pp. 176–177. A major source for his life is a series of reminiscences by his son Leopold, published in sixteen parts in the Newcastle Weekly Chronicle in 1889. There are a number of surviving letters and reminiscences by, among others, B.R. Haydon, John Constable, Ralph Waldo Emerson, the Rossettis, Benjamin Disraeli, Charlotte Brontë and John Ruskin – a persistent critic who, even so, admitted Martin's uniqueness of vision. The first full biography was that by Mary L. Pendered whose chief source, Martin's friend Sergeant Ralph Thomas, wrote a diary – now lost – of their friendship. Thomas Balston then wrote two biographies on the artist, the first in 1934, and the second (still the leading biography) in 1947. Christopher Johnstone produced an introductory book on Martin 1974, and in 1975 the art critic William Feaver was author of an extensively illustrated work on Martin's life and works. Since 1986, Michael J. Campbell has produced a number of publications on John Martin, including the leading publication on his work as an original printmaker, published by the Royal Academy of Arts, Madrid, in 2006.

In 2011–12 Tate Britain and Newcastle's Laing Art Gallery co-curated a major retrospective exhibition of Martin's work in all genres -"John Martin – Apocalypse" – including his contribution as a civil engineer. Featured in the exhibition was the fully restored The Destruction of Pompeii and Herculaneum, 1822. Recorded as lost in the disastrous Tate Gallery flood of 1928, the painting was rediscovered by Christopher Johnstone, a research assistant at the gallery, when he was researching his book John Martin (1974). Its restoration by Tate conservator Sarah Maisey, reveals that the original paintwork was in near pristine condition; a large area of missing canvas has been repainted by Maisey using techniques that were not available in 1973 as she describes on page 113 of the exhibition catalogue John Martin: Apocalypse (2011). When rediscovered the painting was rolled up inside the missing Paul Delaroche painting The Execution of Lady Jane Grey which was returned to the National Gallery, London.

== Family ==
=== Wife and children ===
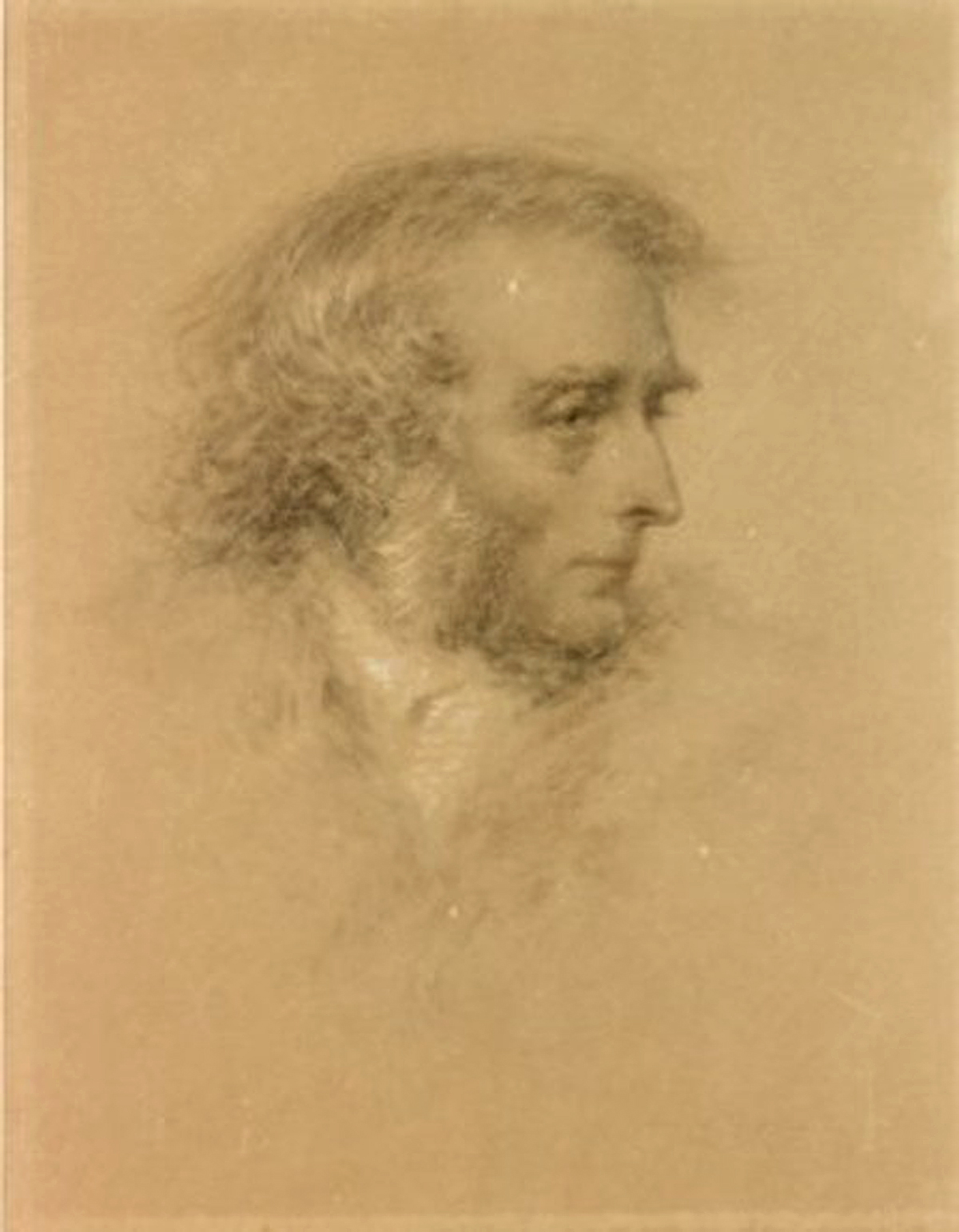
John Martin on his Death-Bed (1854). Black chalk, 58.5 x 45.5 cm, by his son Charles Martin (1820-1906). Laing Art Gallery, Newcastle upon Tyne

With his wife Susan, née Garrett, who was nine years older than him, Martin had six children who survived to adulthood: Alfred (who worked with his father as a mezzotint engraver and later became a senior tax official), Isabella, Zenobia (who married the artist Peter Cunningham), Leopold (who became a clerk), Charles (1820–1906), who was trained as a painter by his father, copying a number of his father's works – he later became a successful portrait painter and lived in America, his last exhibit at the Royal Academy being in 1896 – and Jessie (who married Egyptologist Joseph Bonomi). Leopold was the godson of the future King Leopold I of Belgium, who had met and befriended Martin when they shared lodgings on Marylebone High Street in about 1815. Leopold later wrote a series of reminiscences of his father, published in the Newcastle Weekly Chronicle Supplement in 1889. Leopold accompanied his father on many walks and visits, and his anecdotes include encounters with J. M. W. Turner, Isambard Kingdom Brunel, William Godwin and Charles Wheatstone. Leopold married the sister of John Tenniel, later famous as the cartoonist of Punch and illustrator of Alice's Adventures in Wonderland.

=== Martin's brothers ===
Martin's eldest brother, William (1772–1851) was by turn a rope-maker, soldier, inventor, scientist, writer and lecturer, who attempted to develop a rival philosophy to "Newtonian" science, allowing for perpetual motion, and denying the law of gravity. Despite undoubted elements of "quackery and buffoonery", William had a great talent for inventing. In 1819 he produced a miner's safety lamp which was said to be better and more reliable than that of Sir Humphry Davy. The only recognition he achieved in this field was a silver medal from the Royal Society for the invention of the spring balance. The second eldest brother, Richard, was a quartermaster in the guards, serving throughout the Peninsular War, and was present at Waterloo. Jonathan, the third eldest brother, (1782–1838) achieved notoriety by setting fire to York Minster in February 1829. He was subsequently apprehended, tried and found not guilty on the grounds of insanity. He was confined to St Luke's Hospital for Lunatics in London, where he remained until his death.

== See also ==
- Paintings by John Martin
- Fantastic art
