= The Coronation of Queen Victoria (Martin) =

Painting by John Martin

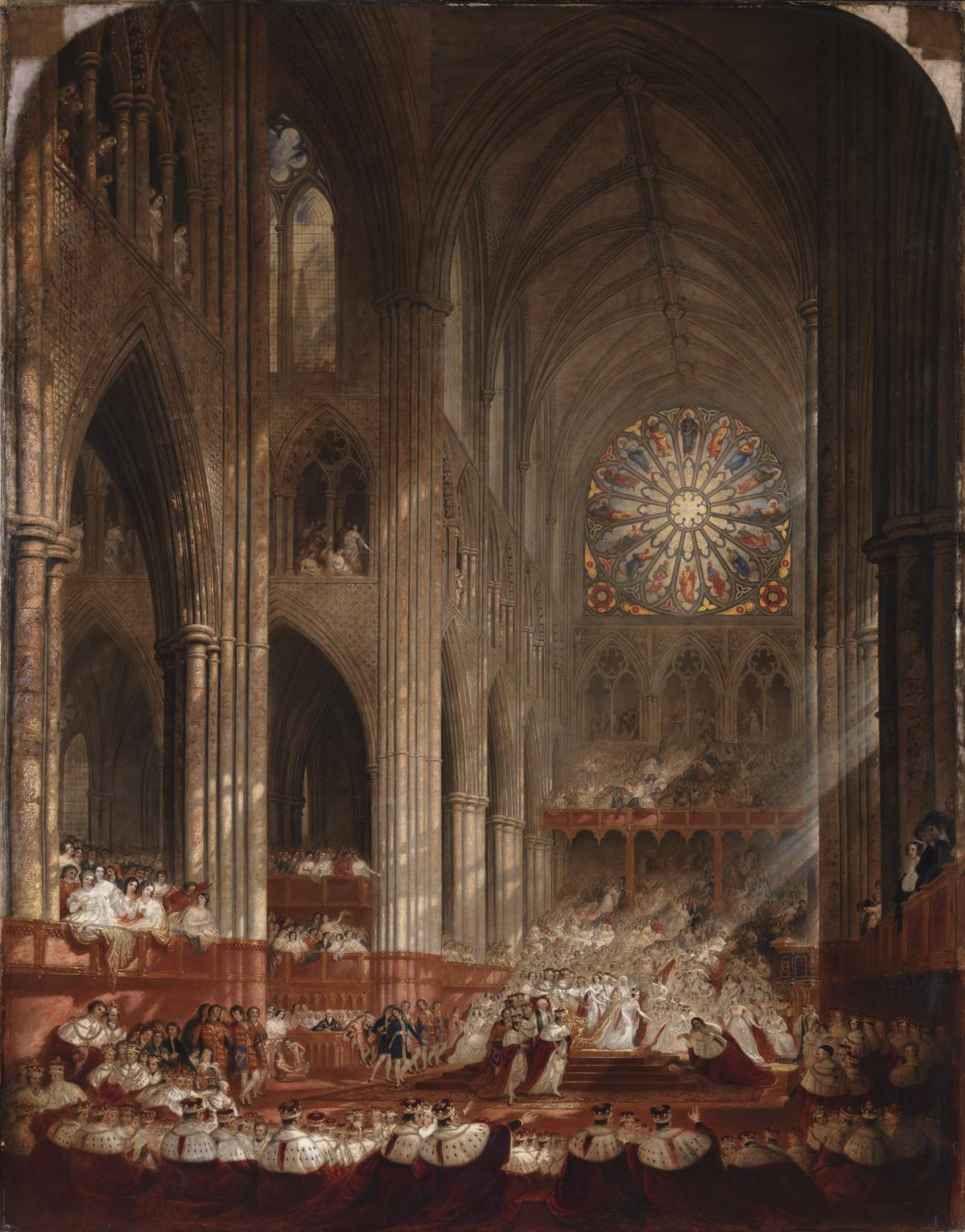
- Artist: John Martin
- Year: 1839
- Type: Oil on canvas, history painting
- Dimensions: 238.1 cm × 185.4 cm (93.7 in × 73.0 in)
- Location: Tate Britain, London

The Coronation of Queen Victoria is an 1839 history painting by the British artist John Martin. It depicts a view of the interior of Westminster Abbey during the Coronation of Queen Victoria on 28 June 1838. Victoria had succeeded her uncle William IV to the throne the previous year.

Martin had built his reputation on his epic pictures of biblical scenes such as Belshazzar's Feast and The Seventh Plague of Egypt. This picture marked a change of pace for him, recording a scene of recent history. It is now in the collection of Tate Britain in London, having been acquired in 1946.

== Bibliography ==
- Herrmann, Luke. Nineteenth Century British Painting. Charles de la Mare, 2000.
- Kinzler, Julia. Representing Royalty: British Monarchs in Contemporary Cinema, 1994-2010. Cambridge Scholars Publishing, 2018.
- Morris, Frankie. Artist of Wonderland: The Life, Political Cartoons, and Illustrations of Tenniel. Lutterworth Press, 2023.
