= James Stephenson (engraver) =

James Stephenson (1808–1886) was an English engraver.

== Life ==
Grave of James Stephenson in Highgate Cemetery

Born at Manchester on 26 November 1808, he was the son of Thomas Stephenson, boot and shoe maker, of Stable Street there, near Oldham Street. He was educated at a school kept by Thomas Rain, adjoining Oldham Street chapel, and before the end of his schooldays was apprenticed to John Fothergill, an engraver, of Prince's Court, Market Street. While there he met Henry Liverseege, and, perhaps on his advice, went to London at the end of his apprenticeship and entered the studio of William Finden. While there he gained the silver medal of the Society of Arts for an original design of a figure engraved in line.

About 1838 Stephenson returned to Manchester and established himself as an historical and landscape engraver in Ridgefield, and then in a studio in St. Ann Street. Around 1847 he moved back permanently to London, and from 1856 exhibited regularly at the Royal Academy. He died at his residence in Dartmouth Park Road, London, on 28 May 1886 and was buried on the western side of Highgate Cemetery.

== Works ==
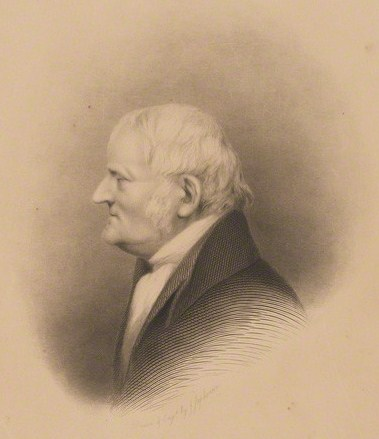
John Dalton, by James Stephenson

Stephenson furnished illustrations for Manchester as it is (1839), for Charles Swain's Mind and other Poems, and for other books; and engraved the members' card for the Anti-Corn-law League. For Agnew & Sons he painted portraits of prominent members of the League, including Sir John Bowring, Edward Baines, and John Heyworth. During this period he also engraved Charles Allen Du Val's portrait of Richard Cobden, George Putten's portrait of John Frederick Foster, and John Boston's portrait of Daniel Grant, one of the original "Cheeryble Brothers". In 1842, for the British Association, which met in that year in Manchester, he executed a portrait of John Dalton.

Among Stephenson's later engravings were The Great Day of His Wrath, The Last Judgment, and The Plains of Heaven, after John Martin; The Highland Whiskey Still, the Taming of the Shrew, and The Queen at Osborne, after Edwin Landseer; Ophelia, after John Everett Millais; and the Portrait of Lord Tennyson, after George Frederick Watts. He also engraved pictures by Daniel Maclise, Gilbert Stuart Newton, Thomas Faed, and Sir John Watson Gordon.

== Notes ==
Attribution

This article incorporates text from a publication now in the public domain: Lee, Sidney, ed. (1898). "Stephenson, James". Dictionary of National Biography. Vol. 54. London: Smith, Elder & Co.
