= Charles Howorth =

New Zealand artist (1856–1945)

Charles Henry Howorth (2 January 1856 – 22 August 1945) was a New Zealand artist.

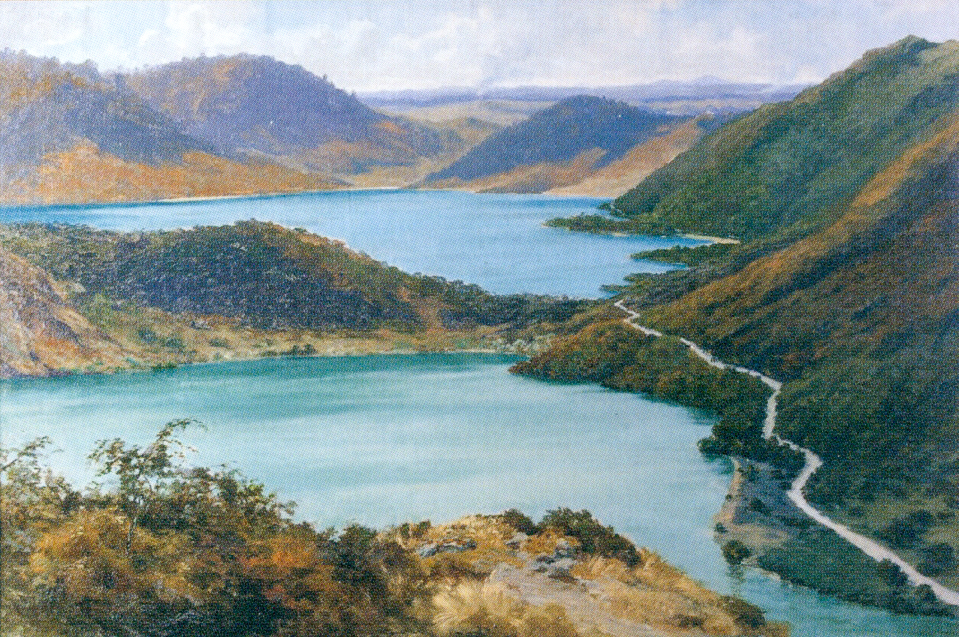
Lake Tikitapu and Lake Rotokakahi (date unknown), an oil painting by Charles Henry Howorth.

Howorth was born in Dunedin, to Sarah (née Mottram) and George Howorth, on 2 January 1856.

An engineer by profession, Howorth lived and worked in Southland for at least 22 years. He painted mostly with oil paints and watercolours. A co-founder of the Invercargill Art Society in 1893, he exhibited at the NZ Academy of Fine Arts between 1897 and 1911. An oil painting of the sea shore near Bluff won a prize at the Saint Louis Exposition of 1904.

Howorth moved to Wanganui in about 1912, and was an early member of Wanganui Arts and Crafts Society. He died at Silverstream, Upper Hutt on 22 August 1945.

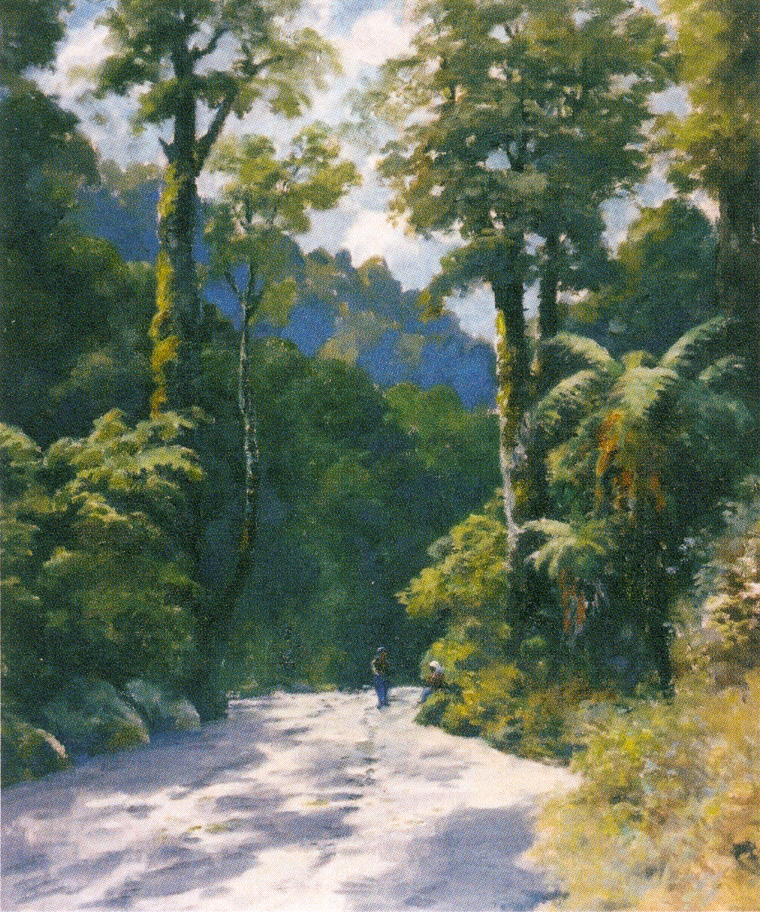
Hongi's track, near Rotorua (date unknown).

Members of Howorth's extended family included the British engraver Charles Mottram (his grandfather) and New Zealand politician Henry Howorth (his uncle).
