= Charles Mottram =

British engraver

Charles Henry Mottram (9 April 1807 – 30 August 1876 London) was a British engraver, mainly in the medium of steel engraving.

While Mottram was born on 9 April 1807 – probably in England – his exact place of birth and parents are unknown.

Among his many other engravings, Mottram's best-known illustrations include four published in 1857: Boston Harbor, which was based on an 1840 painting by John William Hill, and three illustrations based on The Last Judgement, a triptych of paintings by John Martin. Another work familiar to many people is Off Portland (1871) based on a painting by John Wilson Carmichael.

Mottram died on 30 August 1876 in Camden Town, London.

He was the grandfather of a prominent New Zealand artist, Charles Howorth (1856–1945).
