= Portico of Glory =

Main gate of the Cathedral of Santiago de Compostela, Spain

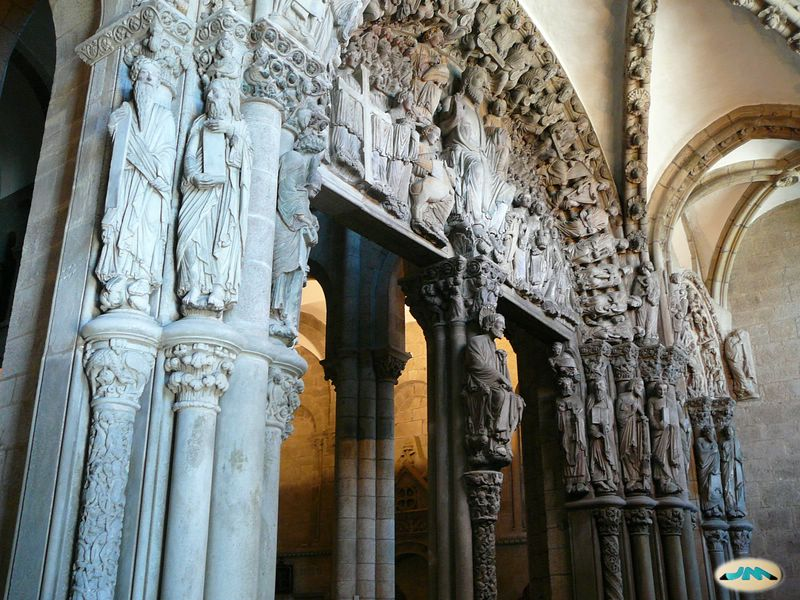
Central Arch with tympanum and columns.

The Portico of Glory (Galician: Pórtico da Gloria) of Santiago de Compostela Cathedral is a Romanesque portico and the cathedral's main gate created by Master Mateo and his workshop, on the orders of King Ferdinand II of León. The king donated to Mateo one hundred maravedís annually between 1168 and 1188. To commemorate the work's completion in 1188, that date was carved on a stone set in the cathedral and on the lintel that supports the richly ornamental tympanum. Under the contract made in 1168, if Mateo was to renege on the deal to create the portico at any time, he would have to pay 1,000 gold pieces (aureos). The complete three-piece set took until 1211 to finish completely, at which time the cathedral was consecrated in the presence of King Alfonso IX of León.

Originally projected as a four-part division, the portal was modified into a three-part format, which changed the proportions of the entire ensemble. Containing more than 200 works of sculpture in Romanesque style, the portico is the artistic high-point of the cathedral and often considered the greatest work of Spanish Romanesque sculpture. The Pórtico de la Gloria consists of an inner double-arched porch and finished with an outer western façade. The lateral archivolts were left undecorated, which may have been due to time restraints to finish the gate for the Jubilee of 1182 and formal procession of pilgrims.

The pure Romanesque fabric was altered slightly and later encased with a Baroque facade. Before the facade was erected, the portico would be seen from afar and would drawn pilgrims up a large flight of stairs to approach it. Without door valves, the three large arches were decorated with angels and foliage and framed a view of the ciborium and altar at the eastern end of the nave. Figures representing prophets and apostles form the columns and jambs welcoming pilgrims inside the church.

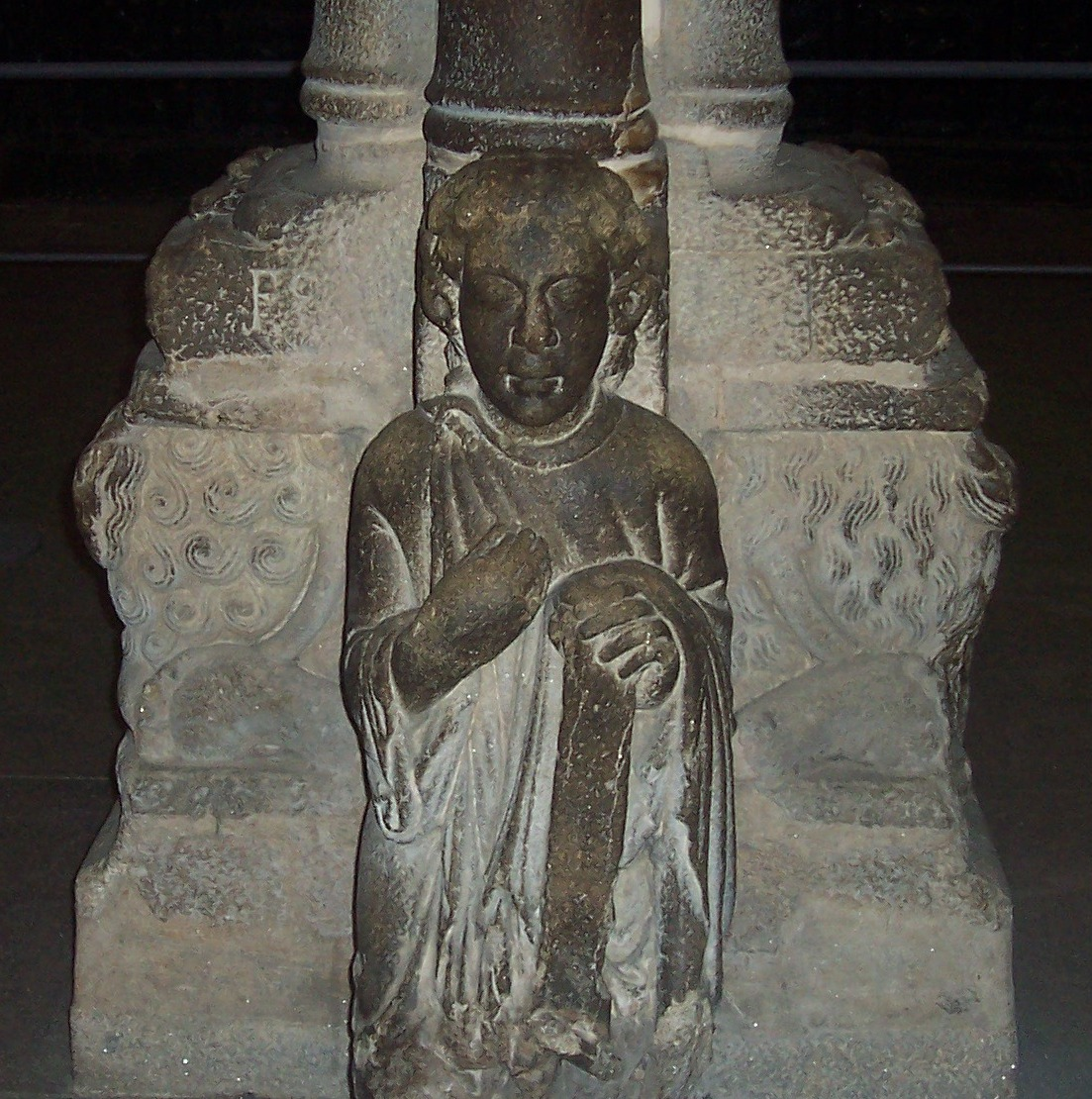
Mestre Mateo inside the church on the opposite side of St. James

Though the portal was originally polychromed, the numerous traces of the remaining paint seen today are due to later interventions. Records show that the portico was repainted often with contracts surviving from the fifteenth and seventeenth centuries. Two types of paintings are distinguishable now on the structure. On some of the figures, the paint is powdery; the colors are light, soft and clear without any additional ornaments. This dates back to the fifteenth or sixteenth century. The more enamel-like painting is harsher and darker with ornamental patterns dated back to the 17th century in a similar style to offering boxes in 1656.

Concealed now by the Churrigueresque west front, the porch cum narthex is no longer viewable from the exterior. The church is responsible for the preservation of the portal to this day. In the Middle Ages, the doors were never closed, day or night. (Note: In 1866, London's South Kensington Museum (today the Victoria and Albert Museum) displayed a full-scale though unpolychromed replica of the Portico de la Gloria, which exemplified the twelfth-century Iberian Romanesque.)

== Architecture ==
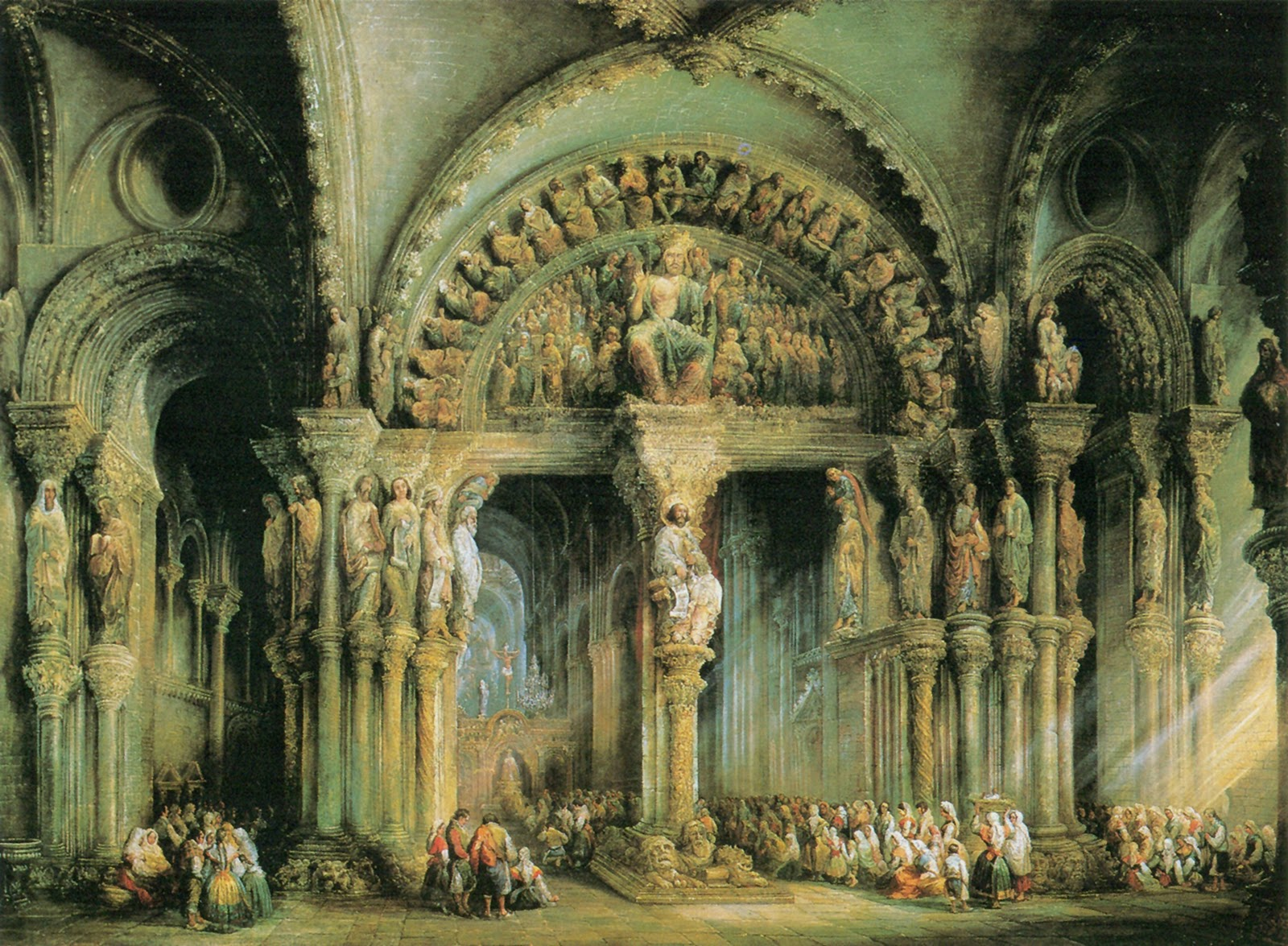
Rendering: Jenaro Pérez Villaamil, Palacio de la Moncloa, Madrid

Before initiating the work on the portico, Maestro Mateo's (Master Matthew) workshop finished the naves of the Cathedral by building a new crypt beneath the nave and the surrounding terrain. The portico consists of an undercroft that is used as a chapel called the catedral vieja. The width of the portico was governed by the western edge of the towers and limits its view; the porch measures approximately 57 feet by 13.5 feet. Because Mateo was confined by the horizontal space, he designed upwards and higher. He used an abundance of sculpted reliefs and three round arches that correspond to the three aisles of the church, supported by thick piers with pilasters.

Master Mateo was also influenced by the local tradition and sculpture of the Puerta de las Platerías and the Cámara Santa of the cathedral of Oviedo. French influence is seen in the iconography and composition with decorative sculpture similar to the details of the cloister of Santo Domingo de Silos Abbey. Style and technique are completely unique to Master Matthew and his group of masons and sculptors of varying skill level. At the time, design and iconography were decided by the archbishop, his canons, and Maestro Mateo. The Archbishop Pedro II was a francophile and a main influencer of the iconography on the portico. Examples include the simple, yet expressive monsters beneath the column bases and the crude human figures. The portico seems to be the last known work of Master Mateo, although his studio continues to work under his name.

Many diverse architectural features are combined including Cistercian and proto-gothic structures of France. The ribbed vault is large in scale and the first of its kind in Spain. The figure's style shows a combination of the humanistic tendencies used in manuscripts beginning in 1160 and the pilgrimage style of depicting individuals of early-twelfth century Compostela. There is a similarity in architecture between the south transept and the inner portal facing east. Capitals in the crypt transept and ambulatory have been linked to similar capitals in the Burgundian design and continues with the portico's large, rounded tympanum and double-storied jambs. The figures of the tympanum are made up of a large number of individual reliefs set up side by side. Those on the innermost jamb are not attached to the columns but rest like plaques. The portico represents the Written Law, the Law of Grace and the Natural Law, what can be called Glory. The central arch represents the final destination of true Christians: glory and resurrection. The left arch is decorated with sculptures of patriarchs of the Old Testament and Jewish people waiting for arrival of the Christ. The right arch represents the New Testament and the Final Judgement. Four angels blowing trumpets are carved in the four angles of the porch and symbolize the four corners of the world. The angels are not centered directly under the ribs and therefore do not support the weight of the vaults.

The Pórtico de la Gloria operates as a highly symbolic narrative whose function is to combine the present and the individual act of pilgrimage with meaning; by inscribing them within the universal and the eternal. The pilgrimage to Compostela is a reenactment of the pattern of the life of Christ and the microcosm of Salvation. This suggests that individual pilgrimages achieve transcendence through its recapitulation of sacred events. Mateo's work on the portal inspired such great works as the western portal of San Vincente of Avila. Mateo's figures in the Pórtico de la Gloria were the first manifestations of the Gothic spirit in European sculpture. Mateo's style and that of his studio are materialistic in representation with plastic accentuation of the folds in the garments. After his death, his workshop suffered and a lesser quality can even be seen at the tympanum.

== Central Arch ==
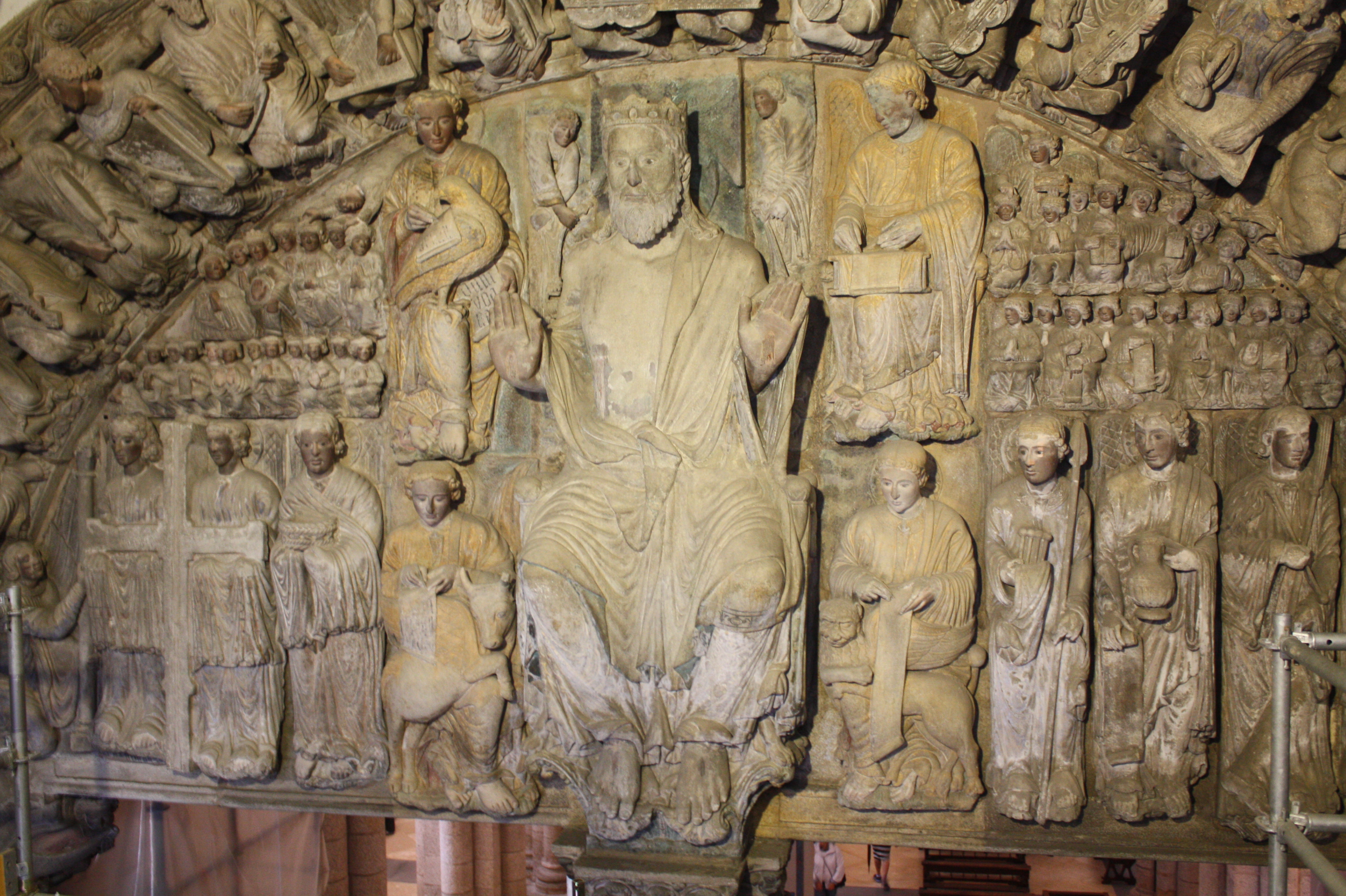
Christ with Evangelists and angels

The central arched opening, twice as wide as the other two, has a tympanum and is divided by a central column—a mullion or trumeau—containing a depiction of Saint James. Its lower part is formed by the bases of the columns and decorated with fantastic animals. The middle portion consists of columns adorned with statues of the Apostles on the right and Prophets on the left. The sculpture is intended to serve as an iconographic representation of various symbols derived from the Book of Revelation and the books of the Old Testament. The Glory of Christ and the salvation of man are depicted in the central portal. Four beasts and 24 elders combine with the angels of the passion of Christ as an apocalyptic vision. This theme was first created at Abbot Suger's church of St. Denis near Paris. Below the Christ figure, Master Mateo has placed Santiago (St. James). In the Byzantine tradition, representations of Santiago as an apostle or evangelist bear no distinguishing features, apart from context, to differentiate James from other apostles. The trumeau statue of Santiago in the Pórtico de la Gloria, depicts a seated James, with nimbus, holding a scroll in one hand and a Tau-shaped staff in the other. Numerous sculptures of James bear witness to the Transfiguration, like the one which the Pilgrim's Guide describes as adorning the west front of the Cathedral at Compostela in the early twelfth century as a participant in the Last Supper.

== Central Tympanum ==
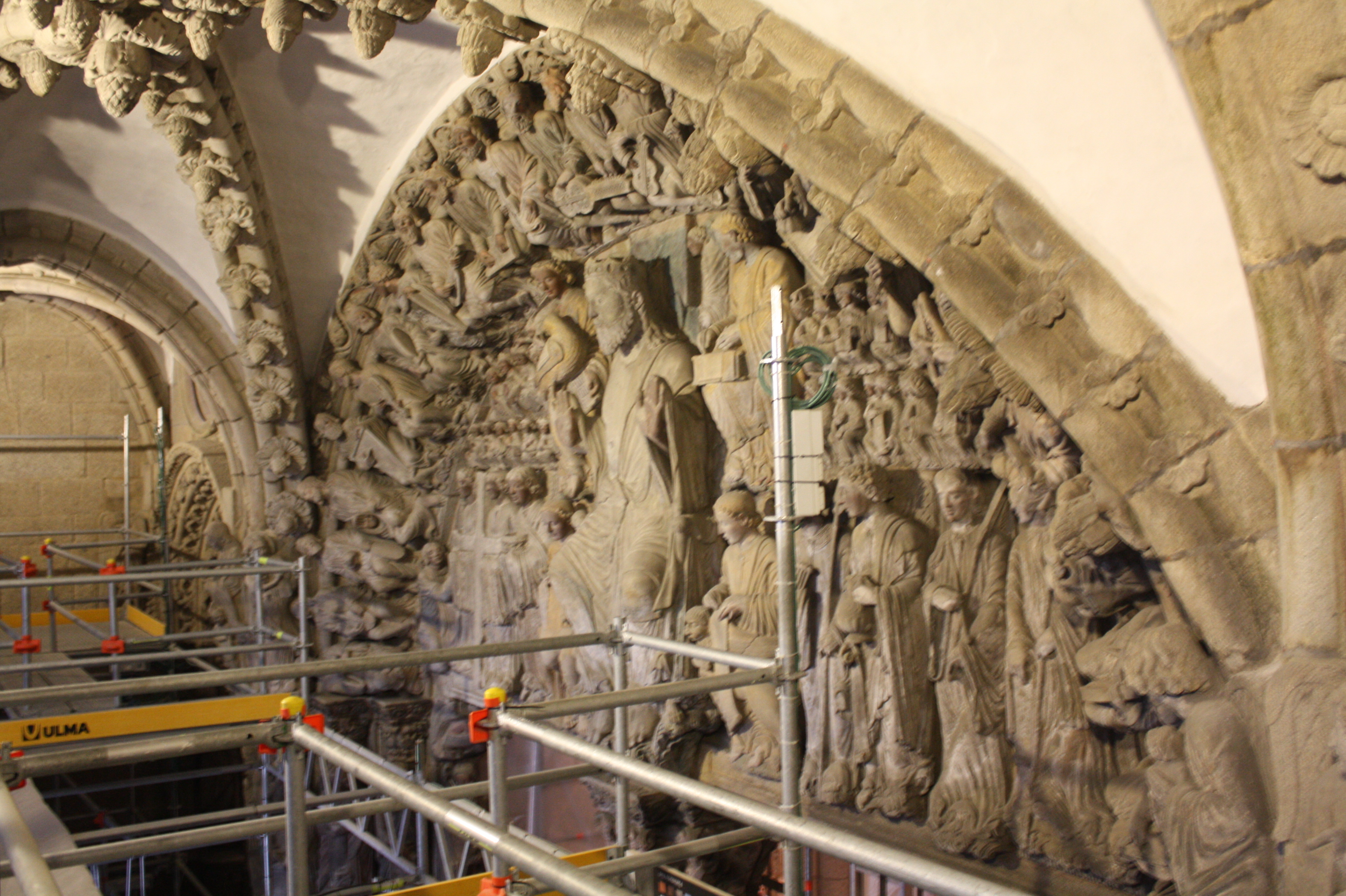
The Tympanum with Christ Pantocrator shown as larger than the other characters.

The arrangement of the tympanum is based on the description of Christ that John the Evangelist makes in Revelation (Chapter 1 v 1 to 18). In the center, the Pantocrator is shown, displaying in his palms and feet the wounds of crucifixion. Christ sits and occupies the center at nearly four yards in height.

The Evangelists form a tetramorph around Christ and have emblematic animals on their knees: St. John, an eagle; St. Luke, a lamb; St. Mark, a lion; St. Matthew writes on a scroll. Eight angels stand on the base of the tympanum with four on each side holding the instruments of the Passion. On the far left, a small figure kneels and supports the column. Two angels stand to the left of Mark and Luke, holding a cross between them. The next angel holds a crown of thorns.

The four angels on the right are all standing. The first holds four nails in his right hand and a spear in his left. The next angel holds the jar of vinegar (Gallegan jarro or water-pot) in his left hand and the scroll on which Pilate wrote Christ's sentence. The letters "I N R I" can be seen on the scroll. The next angel holds the thong used at the flagellation. The last angel on the right corresponds to the small size of the far left angel and carries the rod with the sponge. The angel's feet stand on clusters of foliage. Behind the two raised hands of Christ are two angels bearing censers.

The space remaining on either side of the tympanum above the angels is filled with thirty-eight small figures, nineteen on either side of Christ. These figures are believed to represent either the citizens of the Holy City of Isaiah redeemed by their savior or the "ten thousand times ten thousand" who sing a new song. They are crowded with some holding their hands in prayer, some carrying scrolls, others books, and eyes carved looking at Jesus.

The far left and right end of the tympanum bears archangels and hold the symbols of the Passion on the capital of the third shaft of the left and central arch. Both angels are holding a naked figured representing a human soul towards Christ. These naked figures symbolize the Gentiles on the right of Christ and the Jews on the left. On the outside of both these angels are two more angels of the same size. The angel on the left is leading two children and the one on the right leading three and holding one in his arms. This illustrates Isaiah's prophecy "the barren woman should have more children than she who had a husband."

== Central Archivolt ==
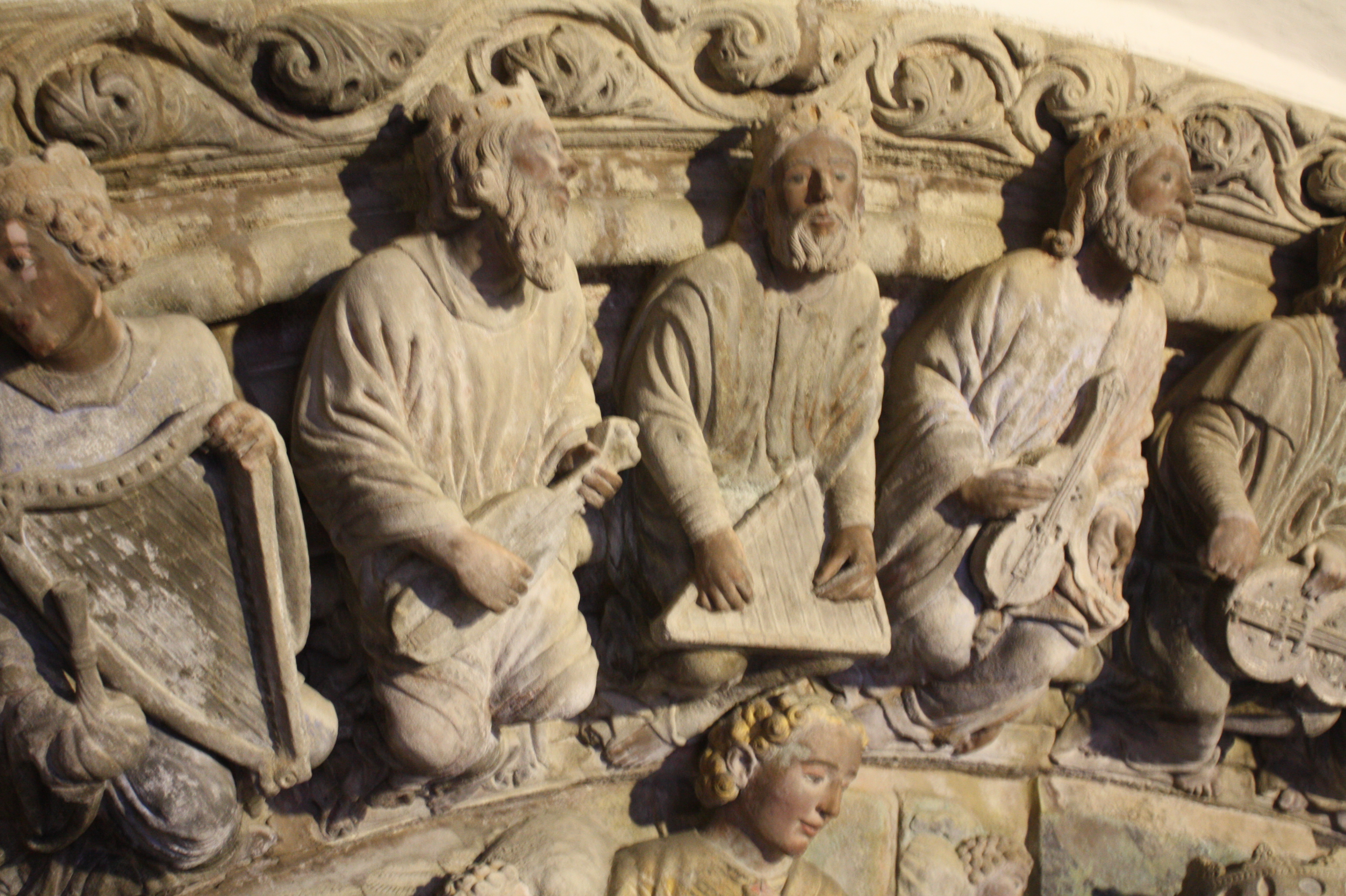
Musicians using string and various other instruments.

The central opening is composed of three rows of radial archivolts decorated with a great amount of foliage. Flowers cover the vault while angels carry and lead souls to Paradise, symbolizing the Day of Judgment and praising the lord. Above the heads of these angels, two large groups of souls of the blessed, forty in all. Around the inner side of the arch contains the Elders of the Apocalypse. Each is holding a musical instrument, as if preparing a concert in honor of God. Among instruments, ducal crowns are placed on their heads and some carry vessels. The figures are seated on a divan and are conversing two by two with the exception of the eleventh figures from each side. The elder's instruments include an organistrum, guitar, cittern, harp, aulos, and eight violas along with percussion instruments including bells, tambourines, and castanets. One of the instruments is an early vihuela, which is a stringed instrument and one of the earliest incarnations of a guitar.

== Mullion ==
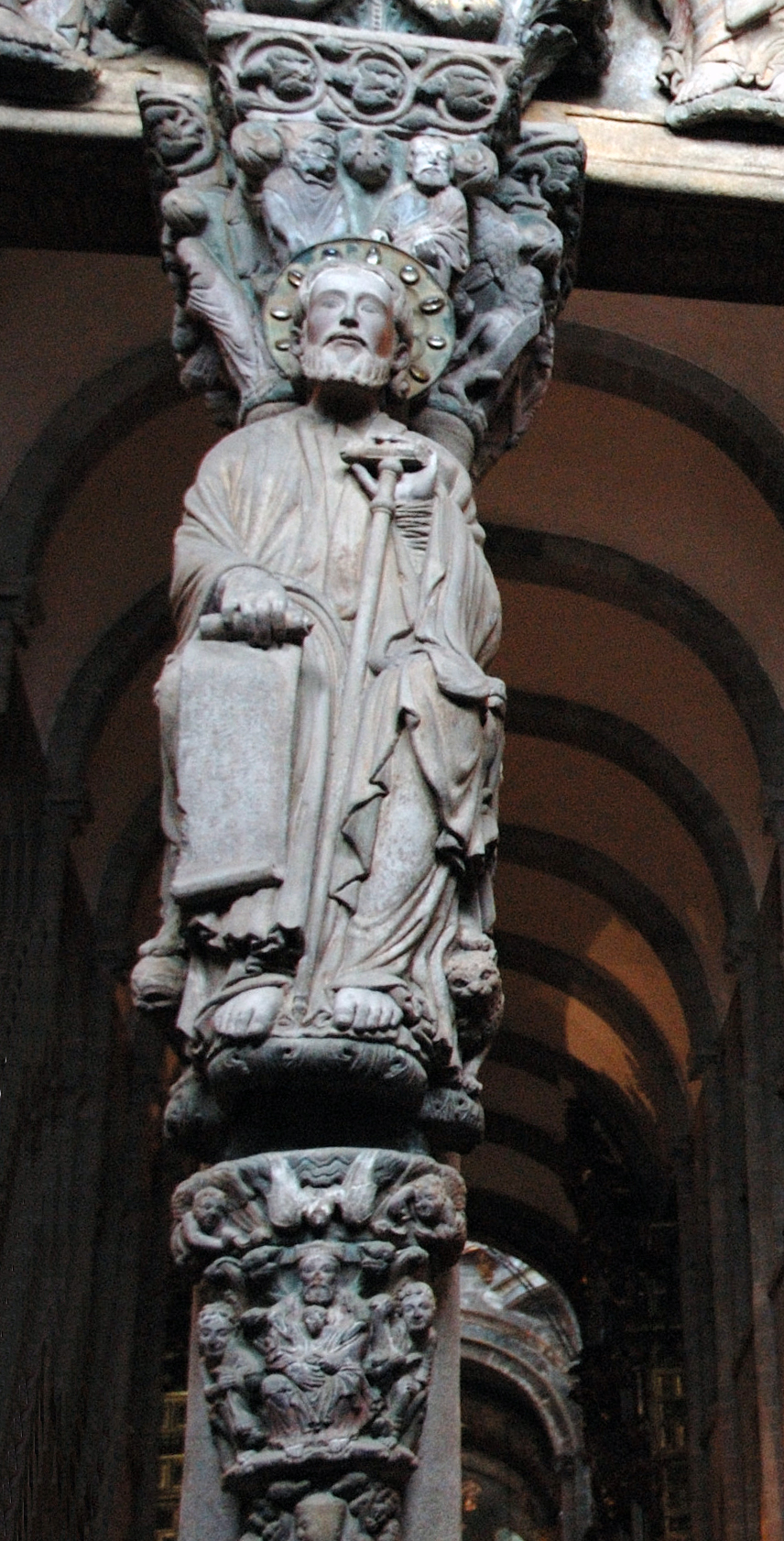
St. James in central column to welcome travelers

The portal's doorway is so broad that its lintel must be supported by a trumeau or mullion in the form of a huge composite column. In the mullion, the figure of Saint James is seated with a pilgrim's swagger stick in one hand, as a patron of the basilica where pilgrims kneel and kiss or touch on their way into the nave. He holds a scroll in the other hand which contains the words "Misit me Dominus" (the Lord sent me). He wears a crystal studded nimbus which dates later than the figure. Two lions support the legs of his chair.

The capital above his head represents the temptations of Christ. On the side facing the inside of the temple, two kneeling angels pray. At the foot of the saint is another capital with the figures of the Holy Trinity. Beneath this is the tree of Jesse, the name given to the family tree of Jesus Christ from Jesse, father of King David. This symbol of the human genealogy of Christ is the first time that this subject is represented in religious iconography in the Iberian Peninsula. The column rests on a base where there is a bearded figure (perhaps an image of Noah) with arms extended over two lions with open jaws. The writing here is no longer legible.

At the foot of the central column looking towards the main altar of the cathedral, is a secular, kneeling figure of a young man with curls symbolizing Master Mateo, holding a sign that is written "Architectus" and an inscription dating the completion of the principal portal. This image is popularly known as "Santo dos croques" with the tradition of students rubbing their heads against the figure for wisdom and allowing pilgrims to this day to come and rub their little one's heads against that of Maestro Mateo, believing it will increase their understanding. This tradition was adopted later by pilgrims, although steps are being taken to remove access to stop the deterioration of the work.

== Jambs ==
In the columns of the central door and the two side doors, are figures of apostles, prophets and other figures with their symbolic attributes. All are topped with their own elaborately carved capital, which depict different animals and human heads with leaf motifs. The names of some of the figures are on the books or scrolls that they hold in their hands. The scrolls symbolize the Old Testament while closed books are meant to be the Apostles or the New Testament.

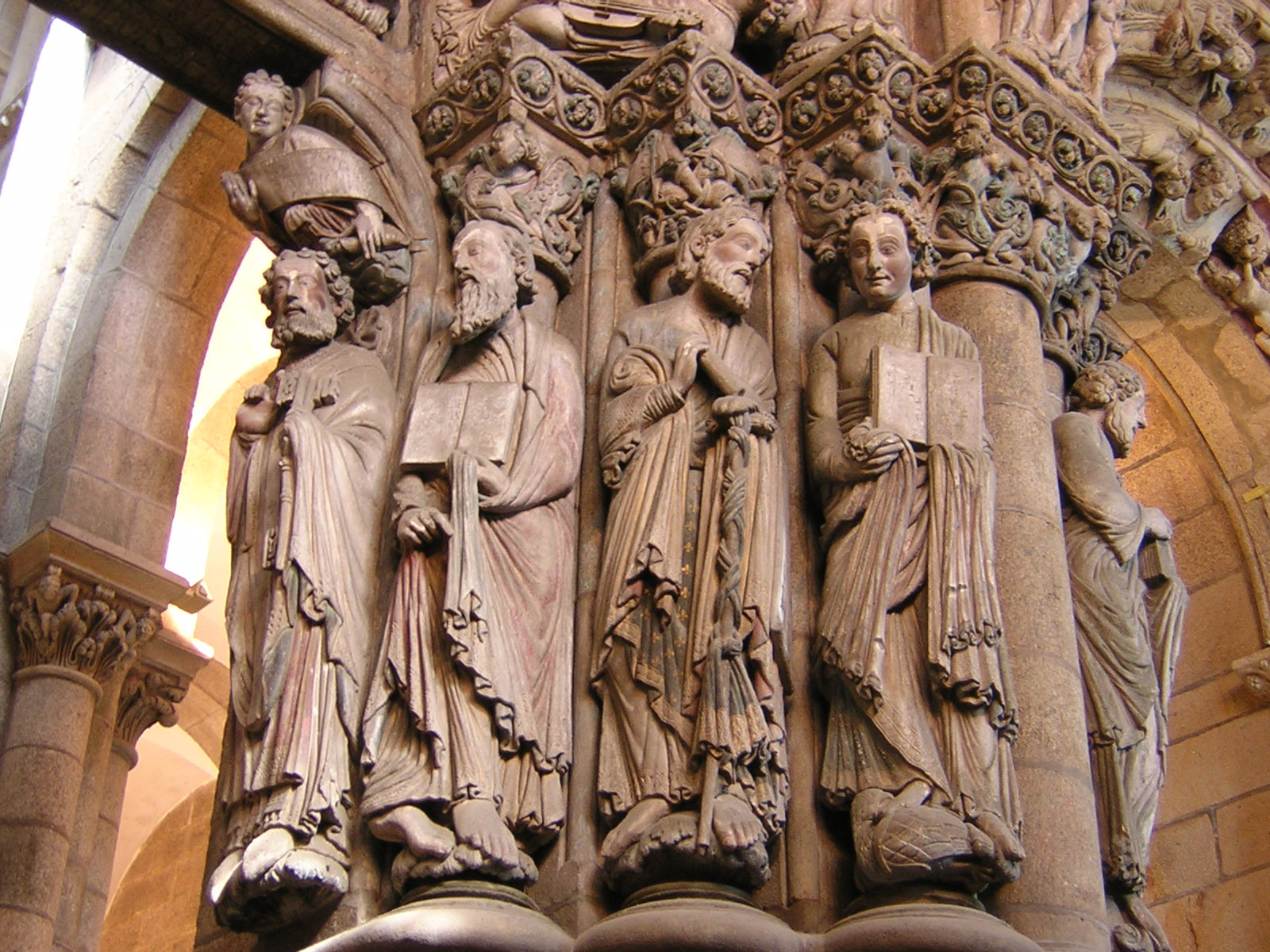
Four Apostles: Saints Peter, Paul, James and John the Evangelist. (from left to right)

The columns display lifelike figures continuing the size of the St. James on the central shaft. The jambs on the left have Jeremiah, Daniel, Isaiah and Moses from left to right. (Note: Jeremiah is the figure holding a scroll written "Hieremias Propheta." Next, Daniel is displayed as a handsome young man with smiling face. To the right of him is Isaiah with a scroll in his right hand, a turban on his head to show rank and his left hand raising his cloak to his shoulders. Closest to the door is Moses, who holds the Tables of Stone with the word "Honora" ("Honor") visible. Isaiah, Daniel and Jeremiah carry scrolls with painted names probably copying the originals. St. Peter is the furthest on the left in pontifical dress holding three keys. Second, St. Paul has a book in his hands that can be read as the beginning of the Epistle to the Hebrews, "Multifarium multisque." Next is St. James dressed in a double tunic with the inner tunic white and is carrying a scroll with the words "Deus autem incrementum.") The opposite columns on the right of the central arch are the four Apostles: Saints Peter, Paul, James and John the Evangelist. (Note: The double representation of St. James is mirrored in the braided scarf depicted on both columns. The farthest on the right is St. John who stands on an eagle. He opens a book to the words of the Apocalypse, "Vidi civitatem sanctem Hierusalem.") All of these figures are standing with realistic expressions, discussing together like worldly sages.

The support of the lateral arches have four figures on the pillars with two figures on either side that correspond with the columns of the central arch. The figures below the northern arch are possibly Amos and Moses on the left side and Obadiah and Joel on the right. Below the southern arch on the left are the apostles Philip and Andrew followed by Bartholomew and Thomas on the right.

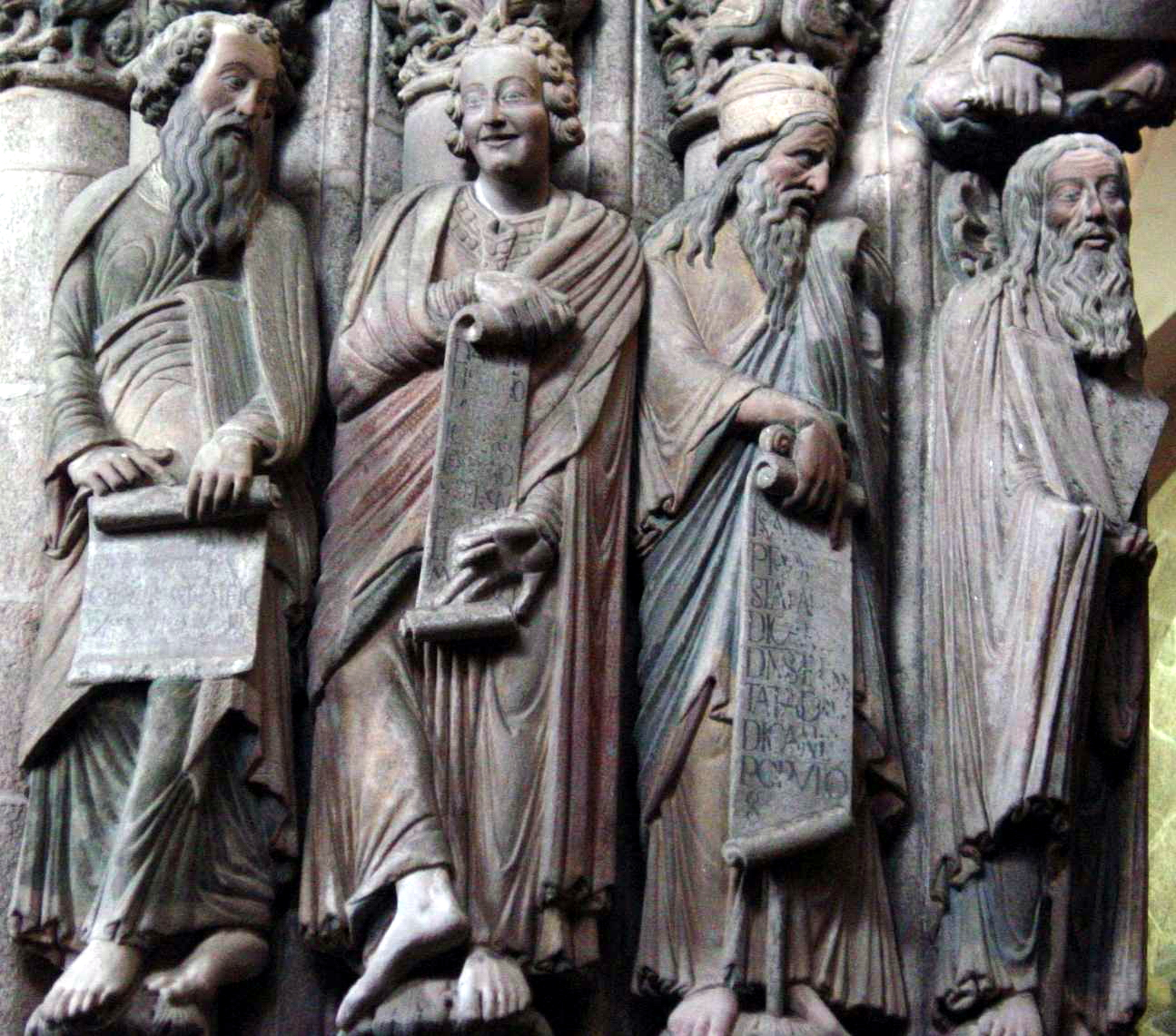
Left of central arch: prophets Jeremiah, Daniel, Isaiah and Moses. The coloring once common to much Romanesque sculpture has been preserved.

There are three more statues on either side of the outer doors corresponding to the column figures. On the left, there is Queen Esther, Judith and Job or Tobias. On the right, there is St. John the Baptist, St. Luke and St. Mark.

Only three shafts besides the central one are carved. The shafts to the left and right of the central column are spiral carved bas-relief. On the left, the sacrifice of Isaac by Abraham is represented. On the right are the Counsels given to the church in the Epistle to the Ephesians. The last shaft carved is to the right of the north arch and shows a medieval tournament and is believed to have replaced a non-decorated shaft at a later date. The shafts have strong verticals accents and emphasize strength and support of the piers.

== Left door ==
The arch of the left door, the northern portal, depicts scenes from the Old Testament, with an upper and lower band with the righteous awaiting the arrival of the Savior. In the center of the lower archivolt is God the Creator who blesses the pilgrims and holds the Book of Eternal Truth. To his right is Adam (naked), Abraham (with his index finger raised) and Jacob. With them are two figures that could be Noah (new father of humanity to save from the flood) and Esau or Isaac and Judah. To the left of God there is Eve, Moses, Aaron, King David and Solomon. Above that, the second archivolt has twelve small figures representing the twelve tribes of Israel. Angels lead figures to paradise surrounded by foliage in the north portal. The figures in dense foliage holding scrolls contain the word of God as revealed to the Jews, but are bound by heavy moldings symbolizing the Judaic Law which imprisons them.

== Right door ==
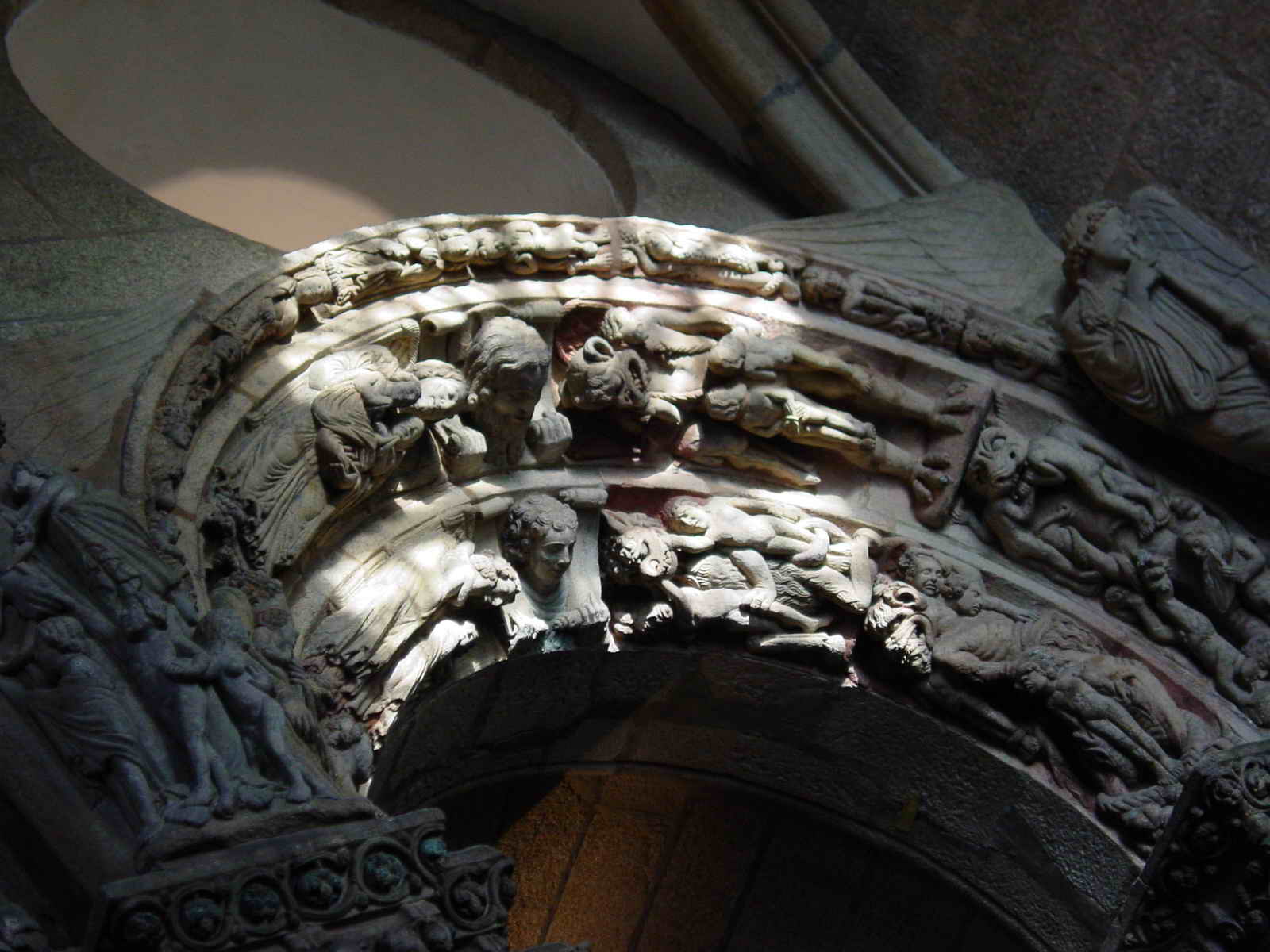
Right Door with two busts in each archivolt

The arch of the right door, the southern portal, represents the Last Judgment. The double archivolt is divided into two equal parts by two heads in the center flanked by cartouches. Some authors identify these heads with the figures of archangel Michael and Christ. For others, they are Christ-Judge and an angel or may indicate God the Father and God the Son. To the right of these heads, Hell is represented with figures of subhuman monsters or demons that drag and torture the souls of the damned enslaved by passions representing Violence, Cruelty, Rapine and Gluttony. On the left, Heaven is represented with the elect, with figures of angels with children symbolizing the saved souls. Four angels trumpet the Last Judgment while the rest of the angels sing. The two busts of Christ symbolize his presence that brings mercy and salvation for all. His physical body is unnecessary and not represented here.

== Bases ==
The four pillars of the porch are sustained on strong plinths carved with groups of various animals: six eagles, a bear, four lions and two indeterminate animals, as well as three human heads with beards holding the entire portico up on their backs. In these grotesque animal figures, there are images of demons and symbolize the weight of the glory crushing sin. Other sources give an apocalyptic interpretation with wars, famine and death (represented by the beasts) and situations that can only be saved with human intelligence represented by the heads of old men.

== Notes ==
Replica in the Victoria and Albert Museum

== Bibliography ==
- Angel del Castillo (1954). The Portico of Glory: (A ... Work of Mateo) An Introductory Study ...
- Martínez, Rosario Álvarez & Miguel Ángel Aguilar Rancel (2002). Music Iconography of Romanesque Sculpture in the Light of Sculptors' Work Procedures: The Jaca Cathedral, Las Platerías in Santiago De Compostela, and San Isidoro De León ...
