= The Four and Twenty Elders Casting their Crowns before the Divine Throne =

Drawing and painting by William Blake

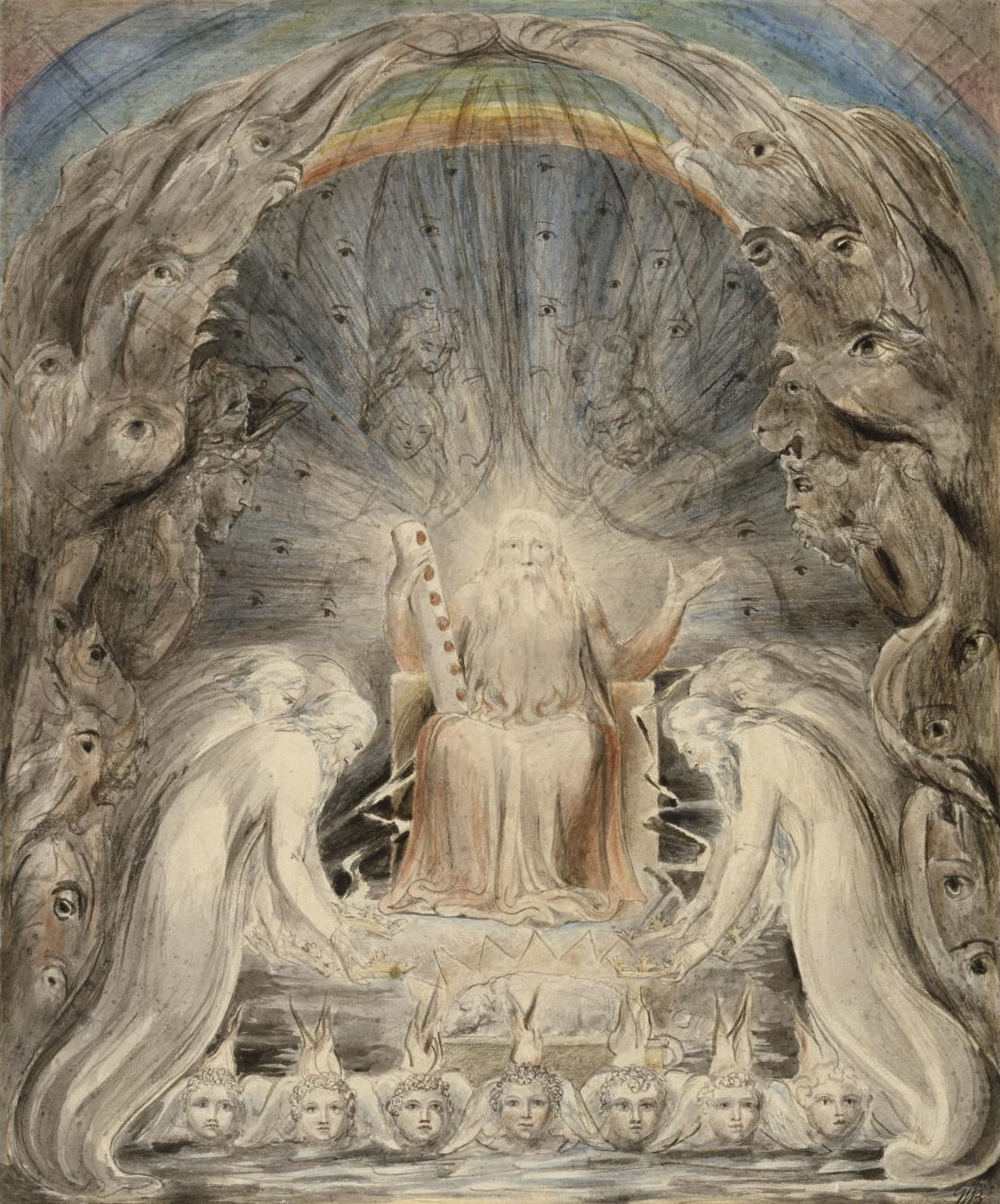
The Four and Twenty Elders Casting their Crowns before the Divine Throne, c. 1803–5. William Blake, Tate. 354 x 293 mm.

The Four and Twenty Elders Casting their Crowns before the Divine Throne is a pencil drawing and watercolour on paper by the English poet, painter and printmaker William Blake. Created circa 1803–1805, the drawing has been held in London's Tate gallery since 1949. It is likely a visionary and hallucinatory summary of scenes from Chapters 4 and 5 of the Book of Revelation when the throne of God was presented to the prophet Saint John the Divine.

Saint John described the scene,

before the throne there was a sea of glass like unto crystal... round about... were four beasts full of eyes... The four and twenty elders fall down before him... and worship him that liveth for ever and ever.

Blake's depiction was created as part of a commission of biblical watercolours for his friend and patron Thomas Butts. The artist began to work on Butts's series around 1800. For stylistic reasons—including the use of pencil instead of pen and ink—it is generally believed by scholars that Blake began work on the piece sometime in 1803. Paintings and drawings from the series are typically characterised by intense displays of colour and The Four and Twenty Elders is generally held as one of the most vivid examples of Blake's output from the period.

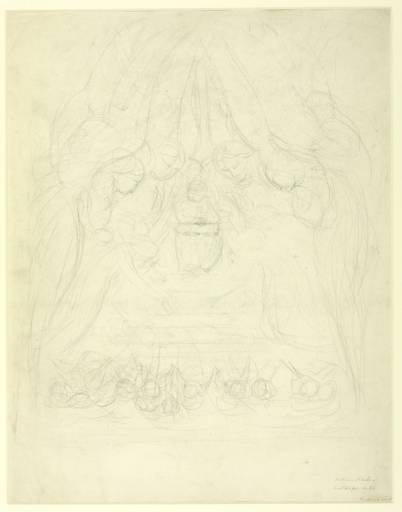
Blake's Sketch for The Four and Twenty Elders (pencil on paper, 488 x 389 mm), although loosely drawn, anticipates the symmetrical architecture of the finished piece.

In this watercolour, Blake arranges the various elements and characters from the biblical text in a highly symmetrical and organised manner. God is pictured sitting on his throne at the centre of the panel and portrayed as an ancient figure with a long and broad white beard dressed in red clothing. The Deity holds a book or scroll in his right hand, according to scripture, "written within and on the backside, sealed with seven seals', while his left hand is raised in a gesture of benediction and blessing. His throne is enclosed by a rainbow which radiates from below a pointed Gothic arch formed from the wings of angels. Before the throne is a slain lamb, "having seven horns and seven eyes, which are the seven Spirits of God sent forth into all the earth". The lamb's seven horns are represented by seven spikes fanned above his corpse, while the seven cherubic heads beneath him allude to the "seven Spirits of God". Each cherub is crowned by a tongued flame, a reference to the "seven lamps of fire" described in Revelation 4.5.

In Revelation, Saint John wrote,

And round about the throne were four and twenty seats: and upon the seats I saw four and twenty elders sitting, clothed in white raiment: and they had on their heads crowns of gold.

A row of twelve white-clad bearded figures float on either side of the Deity, although only four figures from each row are visible to the viewer of the panel. Each figure bends towards God in adoration to lay a golden crown at his feet. Above the head of God are the Four Beasts, "full of eyes before and behind". Above and to the left of God perches the Eagle, opposite of whom is the Lion. Both are portrayed with the pallor of death, and both are situated beneath the distorted heads of monstrous birds and animals. The Ox and Angel are positioned behind the throne and peer outwards, according to the Blake collector W. Graham Robertson, "dimly [and] half hidden in the pale crimson and violet rays which emanate from the central figure, and shoot up to meet and be absorbed in the over-arching rainbow."

There are many uses of numerical symbolism in The Four and Twenty Elders, and according to the Blake scholar Martin Myrone, "the way, as with [Blake's] Ezekiel's Wheels, that multiples and unities meld into one another, underpinned Blakes own poetic conceptions."

The painting was first passed to Butts who, on his death bequeathed it to his son. In 1906, it passed to W. Graham Robertson for £6,720. Following Robertson's passing, the panel was sold at auction at Christie's to the Tate in 1949, with financial assistance from the National Art Collections Fund.
