= The Last Judgement (Martin paintings) =

Triptych by John Martin

The Last Judgement is a triptych of oil paintings by the British artist John Martin, created in 1851–1853. The work comprises three separate paintings on a theme of the end of the world, inspired by the Book of Revelation. The paintings, The Plains of Heaven, The Last Judgement, and The Great Day of His Wrath, are generally considered to be among Martin's most important works, and have been described by some art critics as his masterpiece.

The paintings were Martin's last major works before his death in 1854. They were exhibited to the public from the time of his death until the 1870s to advertise the sale of prints from engravings of the works, being displayed in galleries and exhibition halls all over Britain, in New York in 1856–57 and in Australia in 1878–79. It has been claimed that up to eight million people viewed the paintings during their extensive tours.

Martin's style of didactic expository art was rarely praised by art critics but remained popular with the public until the 1860s. He fell out of style by the end of the 19th century, and his works were pigeonholed as Victorian and religious by the early 20th century.

Critical opinion of Martin's work improved from the 1940s, and the Tate Gallery bought The Great Day of His Wrath in 1945. The triptych was reassembled at the Tate Gallery in 1974 after Charlotte Frank donated the two other works following the death of her husband, Robert Frank. The paintings were the cornerstone of the first substantial exhibition of Martin's works at the Tate Britain in 2011–12, with a theatrical son et lumière show dramatising the manner of their exhibition in Victorian Britain.

The Last Judgement

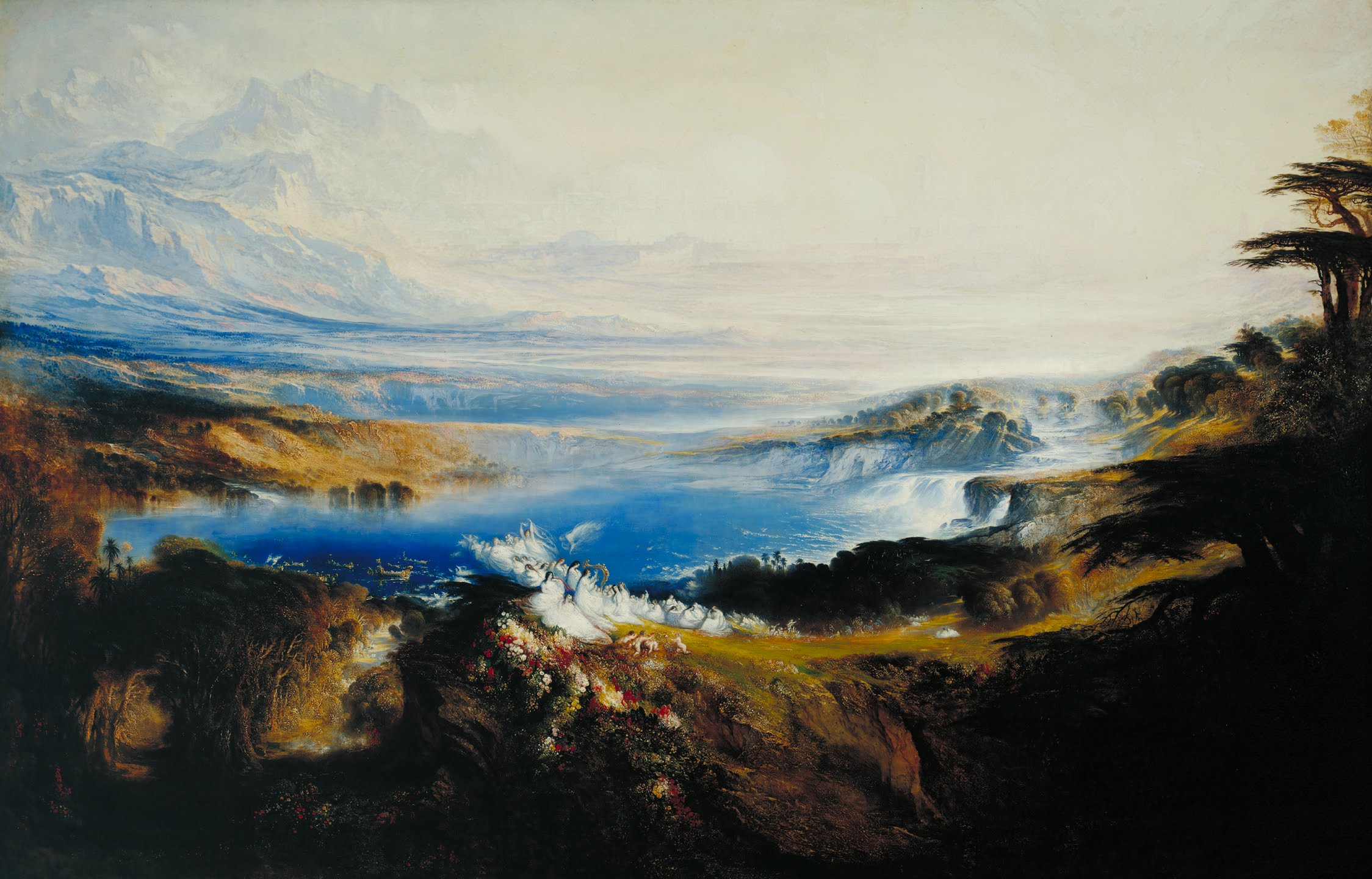
The Plains of Heaven

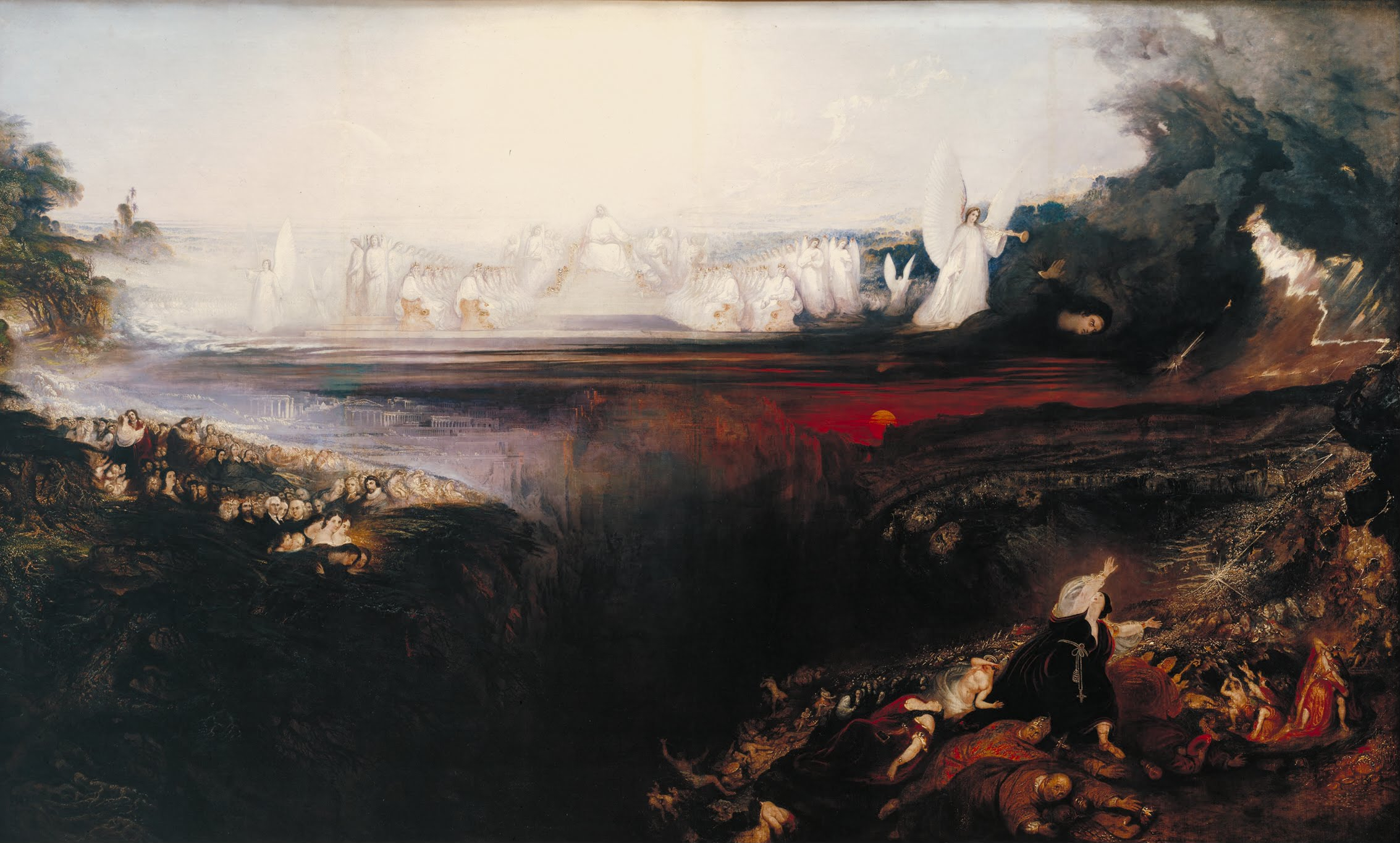
The Last Judgement

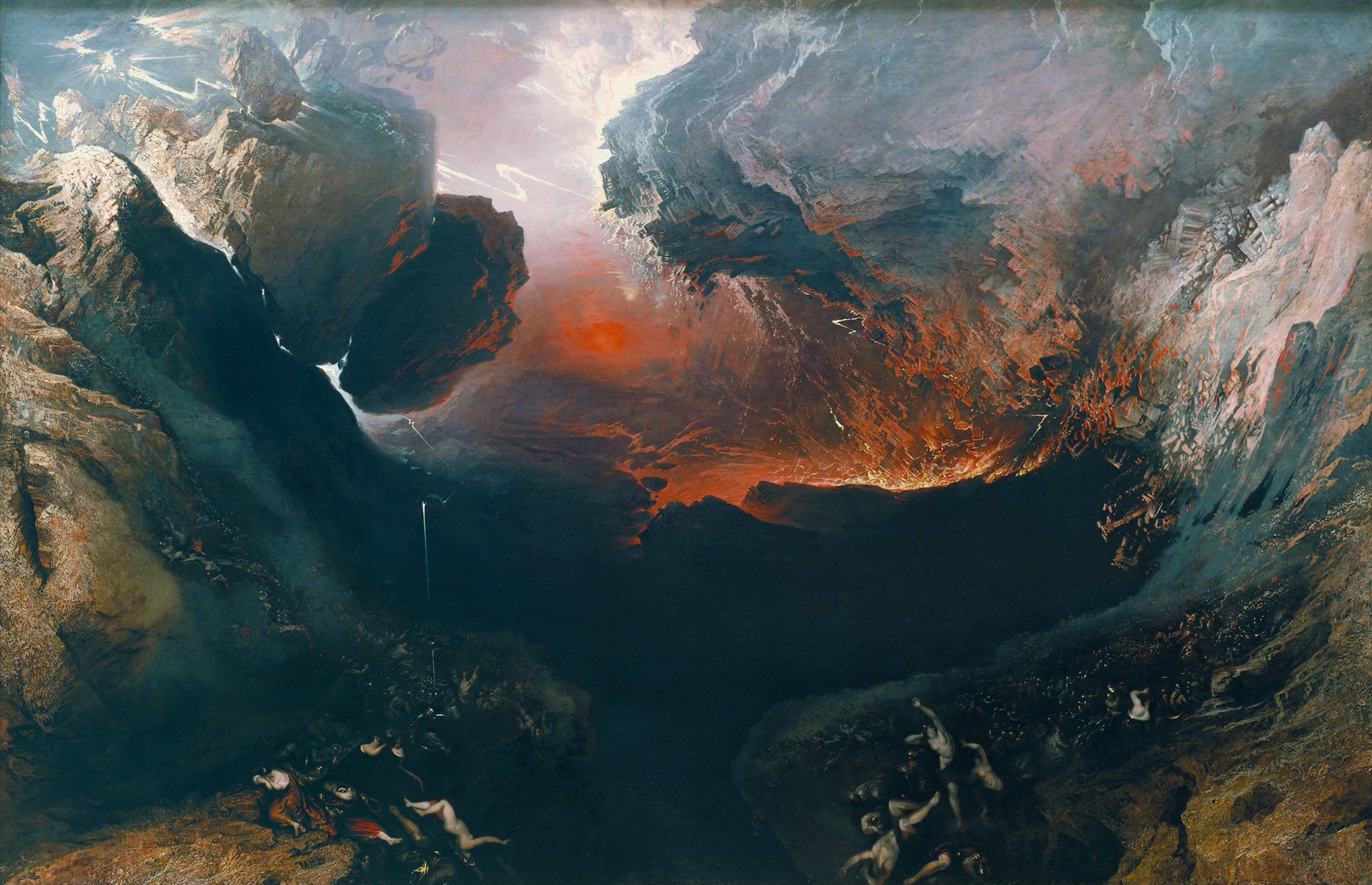
The Great Day of His Wrath

== The Last Judgement ==
The first element of the triptych, The Last Judgement, is the central piece, intended to be displayed between the peaceful landscape of The Plains of Heaven to the left and the turbulent scene in The Great Day of His Wrath to the right. It combines elements of both, with a crowd of "saved" people to the left, and of the "damned" to the right, with the heavenly host above. A drawing in pencil and ink, signed and dated 1845, shows that this work was planned before Martin decided to paint a triptych, and Martin had started work on the painting by the end of 1849. Painted in oil on canvas, it measures 196.8 centimetres (77.5 in) by 325.7 centimetres (128.2 in).

The work reflects the text of the Book of Revelation, which states that the Book of Judgement is sealed with seven seals, and describes the events that take place as each seal is broken. The breaking of the sixth seal triggers "the great day of his wrath" depicted in the second painting, followed by the last judgement after the seventh seal is broken.

According to chapter 4 of the Book of Revelation, "a throne was set in heaven, and one sat on the throne ... and round about the throne were four and twenty seats: and upon the seats I saw four and twenty elders sitting, clothed in white raiment: and they had on their heads crowns of gold"; in chapter 8, "four of the seven angels who have sounded their trumpets after the opening of the seventh seal", and "an angel flying through the midst of heaven, saying with a loud voice, Woe ... to the inhabitors of the earth."; in chapter 9, a star falls from heaven and creates a bottomless pit: "and there arose a smoke out of the pit, as the smoke of a great furnace". The armies of Gog and Magog, "the number of whom is as the sand of the sea" are mentioned in chapter 20, and paradise is referred to in chapter 21: "I saw a new heaven and a new earth ... the holy city, new Jerusalem, coming down from God out of heaven, prepared as a bride adorned for her husband".

In the background of the painting is the Celestial City, Jerusalem, drawing elements from Martin's earlier historical and architectural paintings, with the Plains of Heaven behind. The light of God pervades the work, with Christ sitting in judgement on the Throne of God in the centre, accompanied by 24 seated elders. Four angels sound trumpets after the opening of the seventh seal.

Below, a yawning chasm divides mankind into two parts: the "saved" are assembled on Mount Zion at God's right hand (that is, on the viewer's left) and the damned are gathered on the right. The virtuous men, women and children of the saved include portraits of around 40 famous people—many of which are painted on slips of paper that were pasted onto the canvas like a collage—awaiting their turn to appear before the throne. An engraved key was published in 1855 identifying the principal figures among the saved which include many artists, writers and scientists such as Thomas More, John Wesley, Cnut the Great, Jean-Baptiste Colbert, George Washington, Geoffrey Chaucer, Torquato Tasso, Pierre Corneille, William Shakespeare, Nicolaus Copernicus, Isaac Newton, and James Watt.

The damned include richly dressed women, notably Salome, daughter of Herodias, and the Whore of Babylon, alongside lawyers and clergymen including a bishop and a pope. A railway train with carriages labelled "London" and "Paris" tumbles into the bottomless pit. The forces of Satan are being defeated, with the armies of Gog and Magog also falling into the abyss.

The painting shows the time when "Heaven and Earth are passing away, and all things are made new." According to Mary L. Pendered's 1923 book John Martin, Painter: His Life and Times, Martin originally intended to call the painting All Things Made New.

The painting was retained by Martin's family after his death until it was sold in 1935. It was acquired by Robert Frank in 1947, inherited by his wife Charlotte Frank in 1953, and left to the Tate Gallery in memory of her husband in 1974.

== The Great Day of His Wrath ==
The second work in the triptych, The Great Day of His Wrath, was intended to be hung to the right of The Last Judgement, and continues the theme of destruction and damnation depicted on the right side of the central image.

The Book of Revelation describes a scene that is painted by Martin: "... and, lo, there was a great earthquake and the sun became black as sackcloth of hair and the moon became as blood. And the heaven departed as a scroll when it is rolled together and every mountain and island were moved out of their places." The collapsing pile of rocks to the right of the painting are the buildings of an entire city falling into an abyss.

The oil on canvas work measures 196.5 centimetres (77.4 in) by 303.2 centimetres (119.4 in). It was bought by the Tate Gallery in 1945.

== The Plains of Heaven ==
The third work in the triptych, The Plains of Heaven was intended to be hung to the left of The Last Judgement, and continues the pastoral landscape occupied by the "saved" on the left side of the central image.

The landscape resembles the Italian views painted by J. M. W. Turner, with serene open vistas of greenery. Martin painted similar landscapes in watercolours around 1850; examples include The Traveller and Joshua spying out the Land of Canaan. The scene resembles Martin's 1841 painting of The Celestial City and River of Bliss.

The oil on canvas work measures 198.8 centimetres (78.3 in) by 306.7 centimetres (120.7 in). Along with The Last Judgement, the painting was left to the Tate on the death of Charlotte Frank in 1974, in memory of her husband Robert Frank.

== Reception ==
Martin signed an agreement with the publisher and printseller Thomas Maclean in June 1851, under which Martin's painting The Great Day of His Wrath would be engraved and the painting would be exhibited to publicise subscriptions for the print. Maclean was to retain two thirds of the net profits from the print, with Martin receiving one third. The painting was sent to the engraver, Charles Mottram, by the end of 1851. Martin probably started work on the second and third paintings before the end of 1851, and a second agreement for their engraving was signed on 23 June 1852.

Martin suffered a stroke in November 1853, and died on 17 February 1854. Seven days earlier, the pictures were first exhibited together in Newcastle upon Tyne, where they were shown at the Victoria Rooms in Grey Street from 10 February to 4 March 1854 (The Last Judgement had been put on display on its own at Maclean's gallery in London in June 1853). The paintings were accompanied by an explanatory pamphlet, a technique that Martin has used with his earlier Biblical pictures. The paintings went on an extensive tour of provincial cities, including Glasgow, Edinburgh, York, Hull, Leeds, Oxford, Birmingham, Liverpool, Huddersfield, Sheffield, Leicester, Bristol and Chester. There was initially some suggestion that the paintings were unfinished, but they were signed by Martin and he had consented to the tour, although Maclean had considerable rights over them under his agreement with Martin. The painting were exhibited in London in May 1855, at the Hall of Commerce at 52 Threadneedle Street.

The Morning Post of 3 May 1855 greatly admired them: 'the simple grandeur of the conception, the broad artistic arrangement, and the wonderfully inventive faculty in detail. ..will serve to place the fame of Martin in a much higher position than any of his former labours'.

The paintings visited Dublin in March 1856, and the United States in 1857. The Mottram mezzotint engravings were finally published in 1857, in New York and London. The paintings were back in London in 1860, at Mabley's in the Strand. Tours of Britain continued for more than a decade, with the last recorded exhibition in Hexham in 1872. They were exhibited in Australia in 1878–79, where they were shown in at a gallery in Melbourne and were included unofficially in the British Court at the Sydney International Exhibition

It has been claimed that up to eight million people viewed the paintings during the extensive tours.

== Ownership ==
The ownership of the paintings after Martin's death remains unclear. They are not mentioned in his will, and the agreement with Maclean (which gave Maclean two thirds of the profits from the sale of prints, and the right to use the paintings to market the prints) meant that they were on tour for decades. It seems likely that they were bequeathed to a cousin, Maria Thompson, who had married the son of Thomas Wilson, his host during his regular visits to the Isle of Man and who nursed him in his final illness. There was also another family connection—Thomas Wilson was married to the sister of Martin's wife.

The works remained in the extended Wilson-Martin family—in the possession of the artist's son Charles by about 1872—and his son Thomas Carew Hunt Martin lent the paintings for an exhibition at Earls Court in 1897. They were repeatedly put up for sale by auction but there were no buyers. By the 1890s, they were displayed "in a dingy room" at Alexandra Palace, and then on the staircase at the Dore Gallery from around 1900 to the 1920s. By 1923, they had been taken out of their frames and were rolled up and stored in a warehouse. They were sold at auction in 1935 for £7 by Rex Nan Kivell, manager of the Redfern Gallery. The Tate bought The Great Day of his Wrath from Kivell in 1945. After the sale, The Last Judgement was cut into four strips to decorate a screen. It was acquired by Robert Frank in 1947 and restored. Frank also acquired The Plains of Heaven. The triptych was reassembled at the Tate Gallery in 1974 after Charlotte Frank donated the two other works following the death of her husband, Robert Frank.
