= Twenty-Four Elders =

Group in the Bible's Book of Revelation

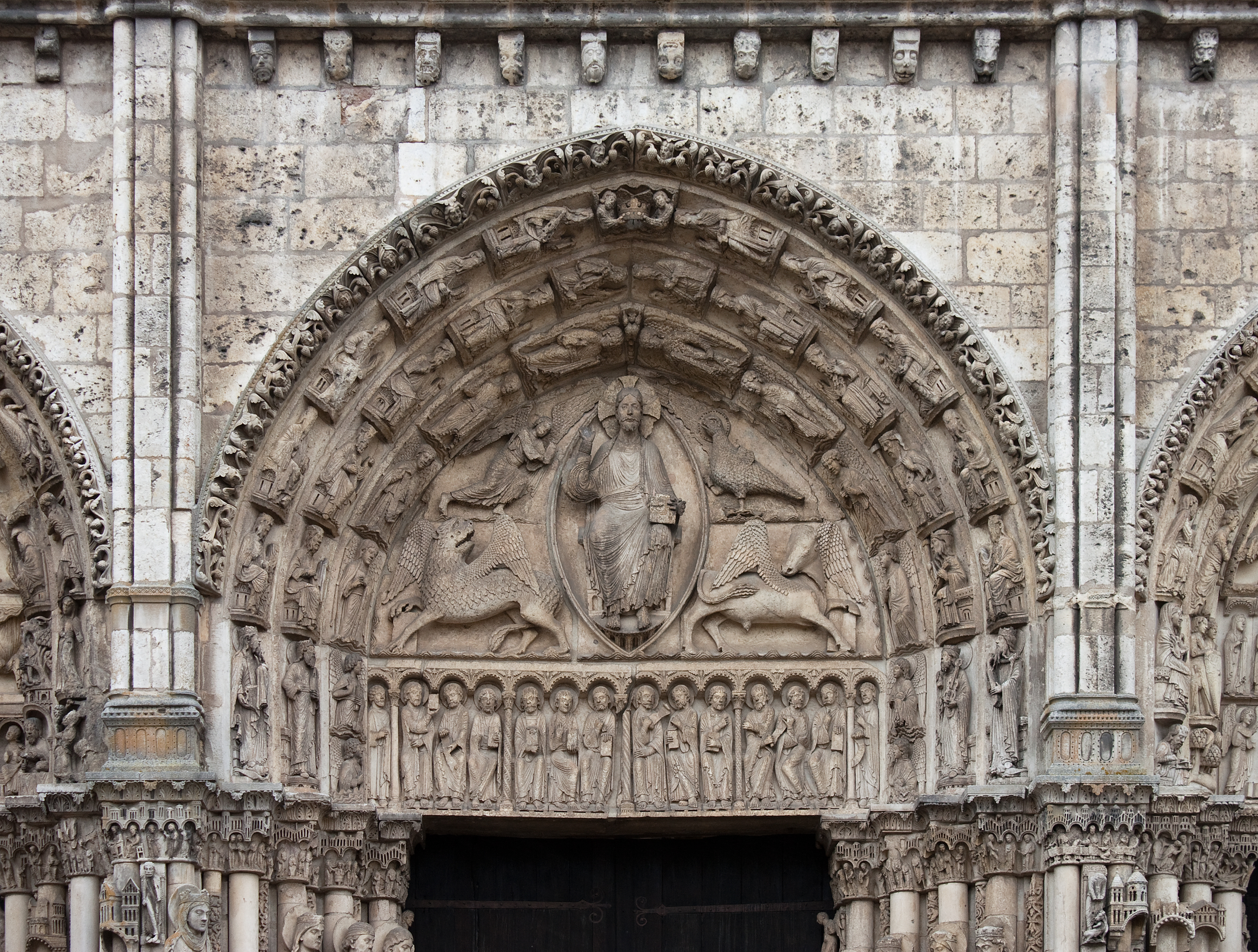
12th century A.D., France. The Portal Royal of the Chartres Cathedral, with Christ at the center, surrounded by the Four Evangelists with the 24 Elders of the Apocalypse above (with others).

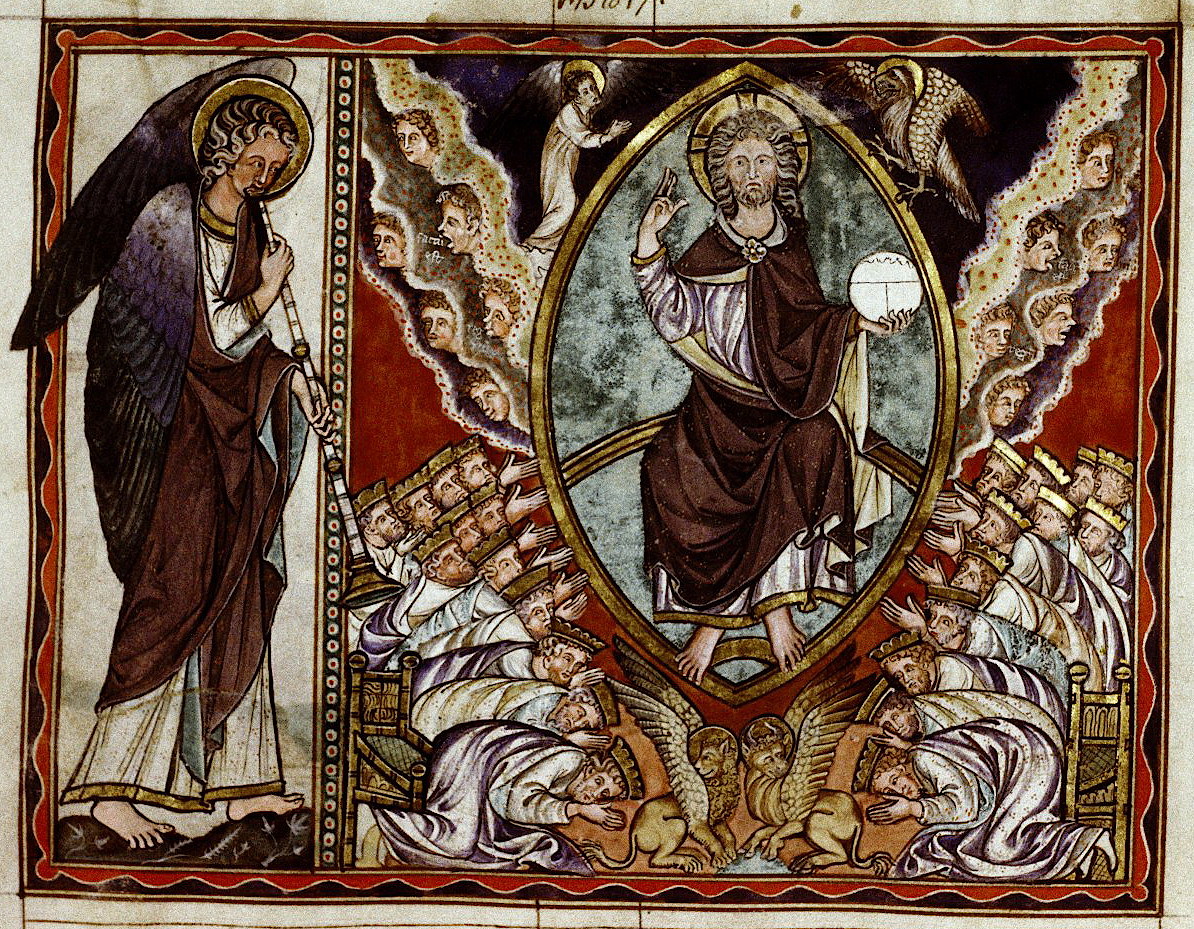
Circa 1265-70 England. Douce Apocalypse - Bodleian Ms180. Angel with the seventh trumpet. Christ proclaimed by the elders. (Revelations 11: 15-17)

The Twenty-Four Elders are figures from the Book of Revelation who appear in the Revelations 4, 5, 7, 11 and 19 of the Christian Bible; in white robes and golden crowns they sit with musical instruments on thrones before God during the Apocalypse and praise and worship him.

Religious scholars have pointed out the thrones indicate that these are beings of power and authority in Heaven, the crowns indicate that their faith has been tested and the white robes indicate that they are clothed in righteousness.

They are described in the King James Bible, Book of Revelation 4 as:

4 And round about the throne were four and twenty seats: and upon the seats I saw four and twenty elders sitting, clothed in white raiment; and they had on their heads crowns of gold.
10 The four and twenty elders fall down before him that sat on the throne, and worship him that liveth for ever and ever, and cast their crowns before the throne, saying,
11 Thou art worthy, O Lord, to receive glory and honour and power: for thou hast created all things, and for thy pleasure they are and were created.

From Revelation 5:

8 And when he had taken the book, the four beasts and four and twenty elders fell down before the Lamb, having every one of them harps, and golden vials full of odours, which are the prayers of saints.

From Revelation 11:

15 And the seventh angel sounded; and there were great voices in Heaven, saying, The kingdoms of this world are become the kingdoms of our Lord, and of his Christ; and he shall reign for ever and ever.
16 And the four and twenty elders, which sat before God on their seats, fell upon their faces, and worshipped God,
17 Saying, We give thee thanks, O Lord God Almighty, which art, and wast, and art to come; because thou hast taken to thee thy great power, and hast reigned.

18 And the nations were angry, and thy wrath is come, and the time of the dead, that they should be judged, and that thou shouldest give reward unto thy servants the prophets, and to the saints, and them that fear thy name, small and great; and shouldest destroy them which destroy the earth.

== Depiction in artwork ==
See Revelation's four living beings

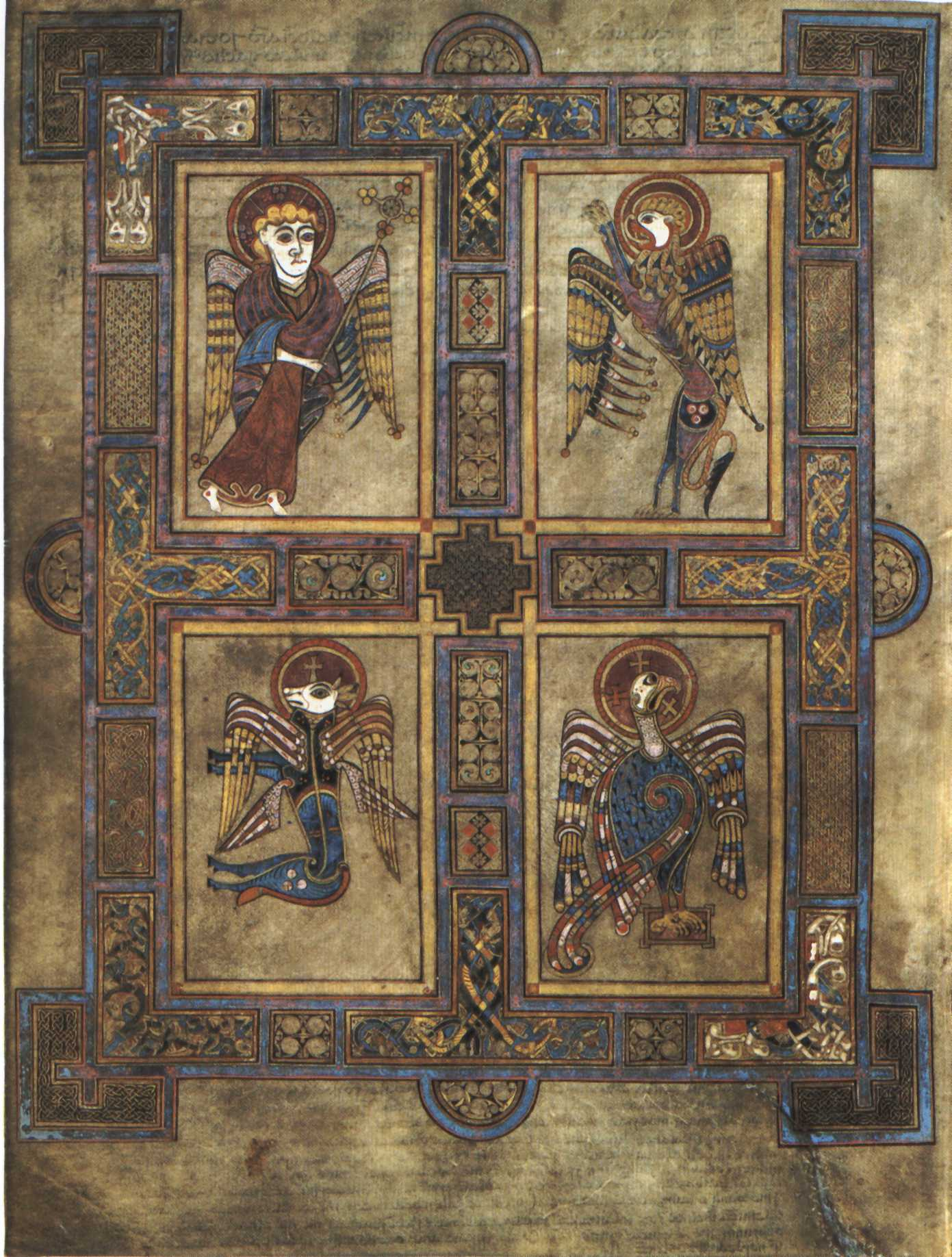
Illumination from the Book of Kells, showing the Four Evangelists, Matthew (the Winged Man or Angel), Mark (the Winged Lion), Luke (the Winged Ox or Bull), and John (the Eagle).

The twenty-four elders, presbyters, or priests were venerated in Egyptian Coptic Christianity since at least the seventh or eighth century, with the earliest surviving depiction dated to the ninth century in Aswan. Today, the twenty-four elders are a common depiction within the inner-most niches of the sanctuary, commonly known as the "Bosom of the Father" in Coptic circles, which typically depicts the throne room (Revelation 4) of which the elders are a major component. Additionally, the portrayal twenty-four elders prostrating continually in the book of Revelation may have contributed to the liturgical theology of the Coptic church, which allows prostrations year-long during the Eucharistic liturgy.

The elders are also often depicted in medieval and Renaissance artwork with musical instruments.

The same medieval and Renaissance artwork draws from Revelation 4, showing the Elders with Christ. That artwork also depicts the "four beasts" who surround Christ.

6 And before the throne there was a sea of glass like unto crystal: and in the midst of the throne, and round about the throne, were four beasts full of eyes before and behind.
7 And the first beast was like a lion, and the second beast like a calf, and the third beast had a face as a man, and the fourth beast was like a flying eagle.
8 And the four beasts had each of them six wings about him; and they were full of eyes within: and they rest not day and night, saying, Holy, holy, holy, Lord God Almighty, which was, and is, and is to come.
9 And when those beasts give glory and honour and thanks to him that sat on the throne, who liveth for ever and ever

The eagle, lion, calf and man may be the symbols of the Four Evangelists or their Gospels. Alternatively they may be the four cherubim from Ezekiel 1 and Ezekiel 10.

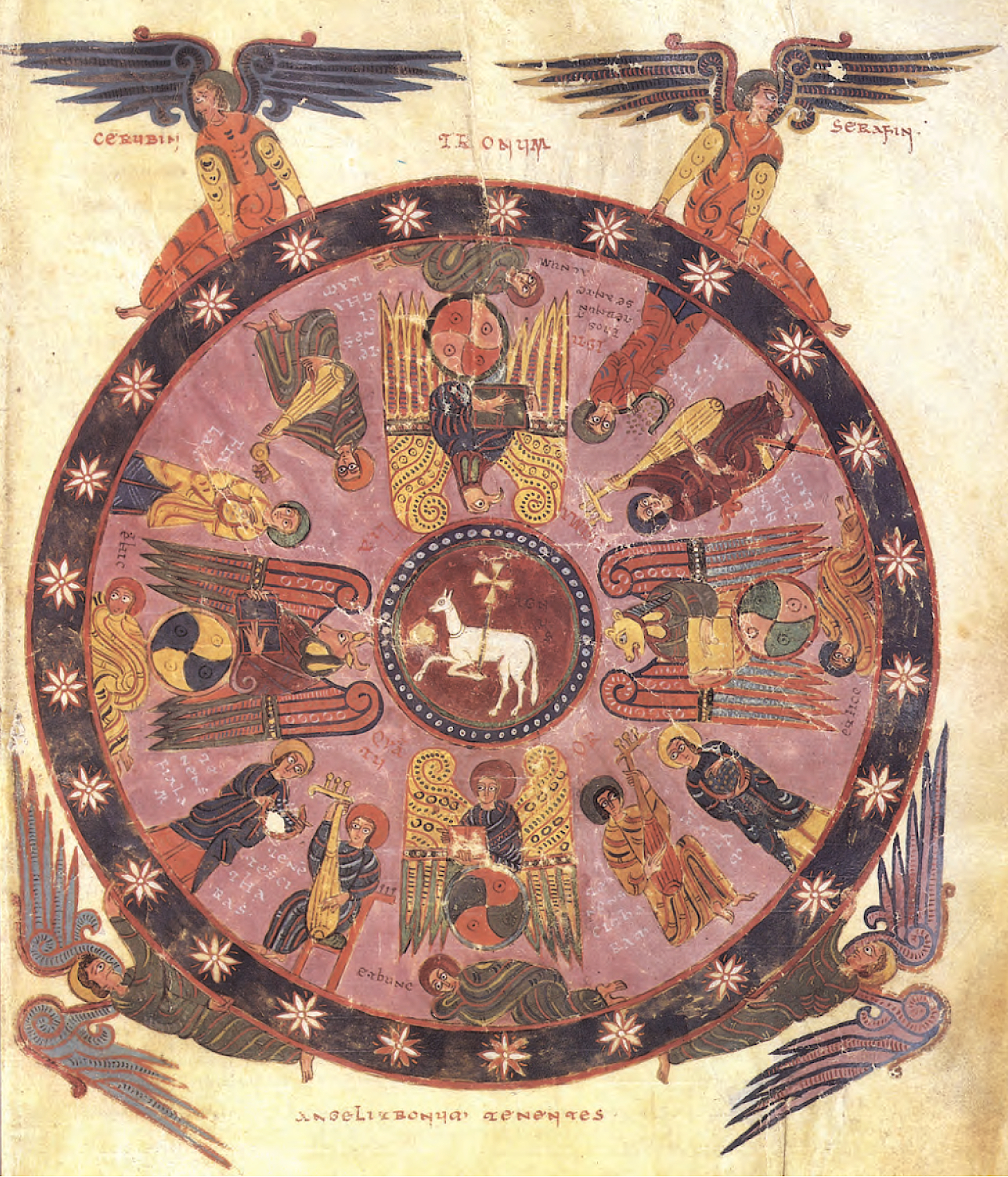
Circa 925-968 A.D., Spain. Illumination from Commentary on the Apocalypse, showing the Vision of the Lamb, the four cherubim and some of the 24 elders. Morgan Beatus, Ms. 644

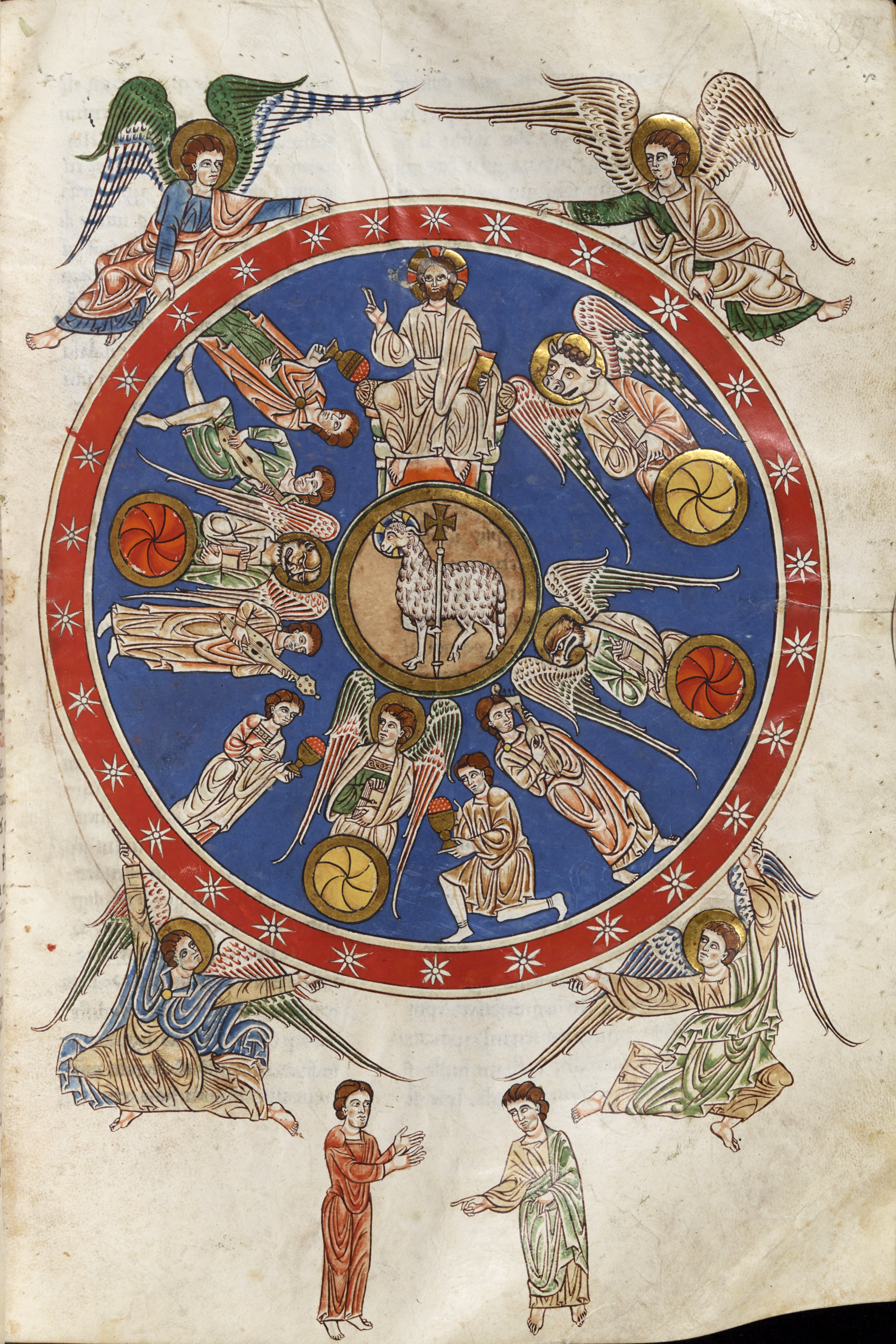
Circa 1175 A.D., Spain. Illumination from Commentary on the Apocalypse, Rylands Beatus. Elders with musical instruments and bowls, next to the Four Beasts (Revelations 4). The Lamb of God (center) beneath God the Father. Angel talking to John (bottom). Four Cherubim (or seraphim) on the corners.

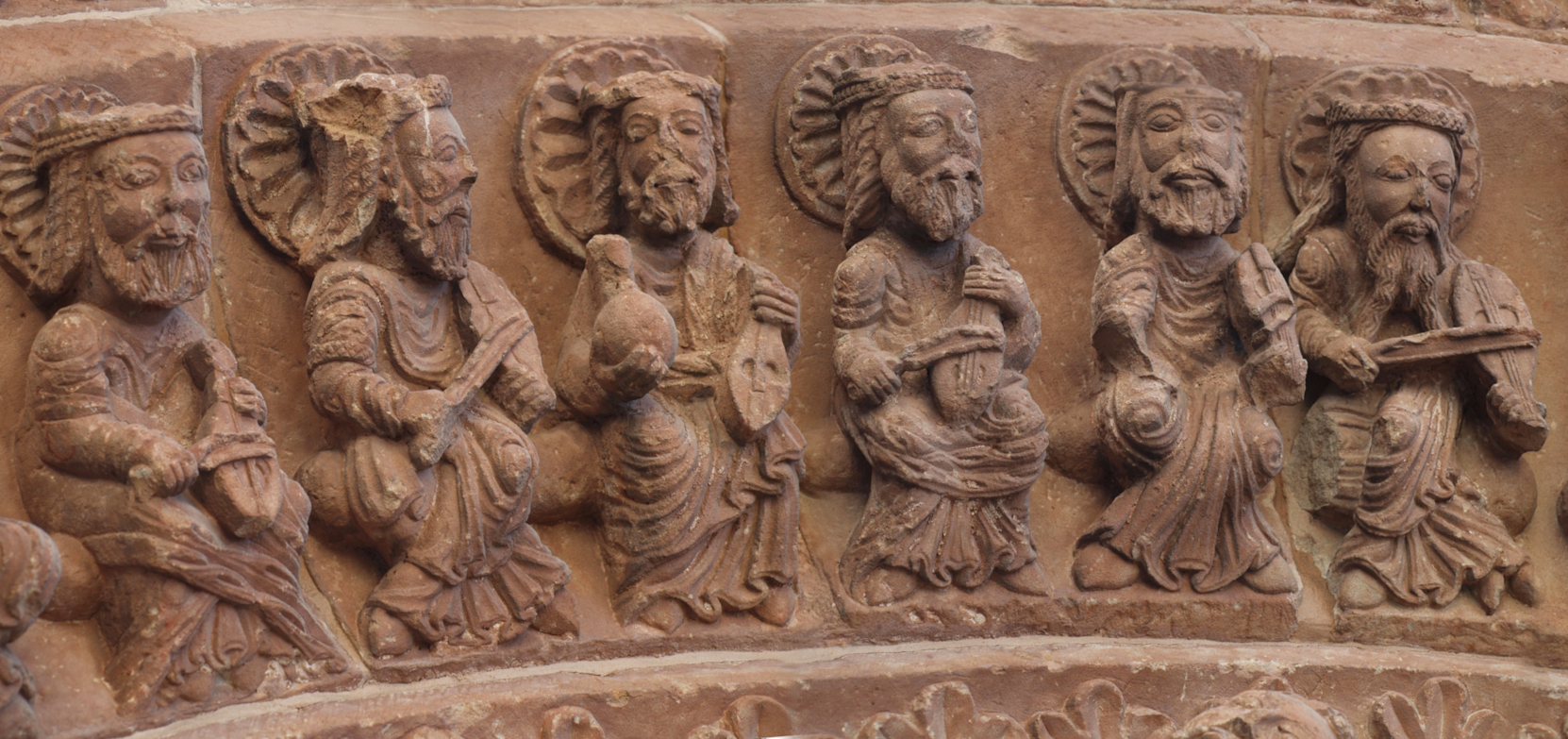
Elders of the apocalypse with rebecs (substitute for harps) and vials. Santo Domingo de Soria

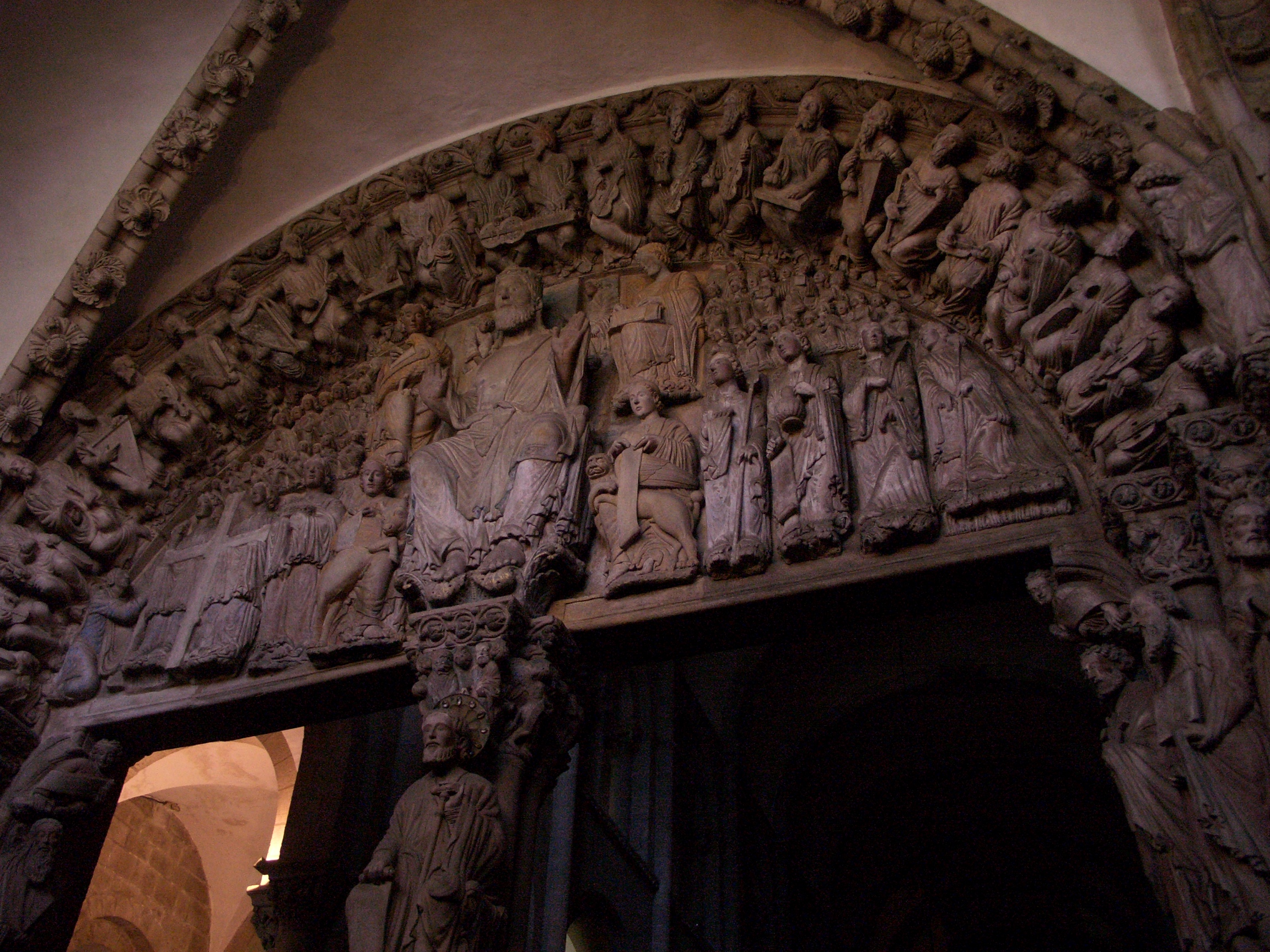
1188 A.D., Spain. Portico of Glory from the Santiago de Compostela Cathedral, featuring Christ surrounded by the Four Evangelists, the 24 Elders of the Apocalypse overhead.

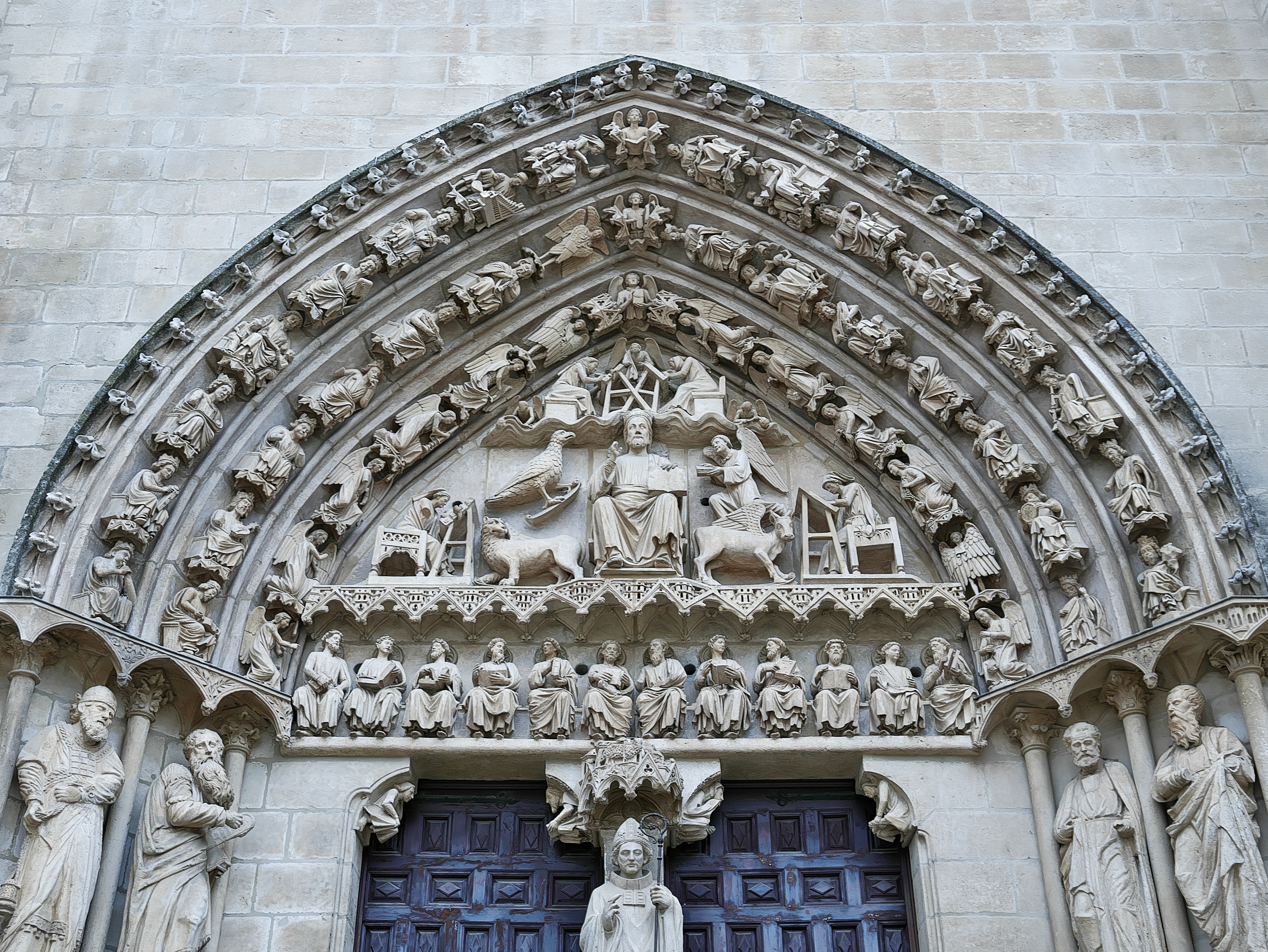
1230-1240 A.D., Spain. Tympanum of the Sarmental Portal, Burgos Cathedral, with Christ, the Four Evangelists, the 24 Elders of the Apocalypse (with musical instruments), angels, and others.

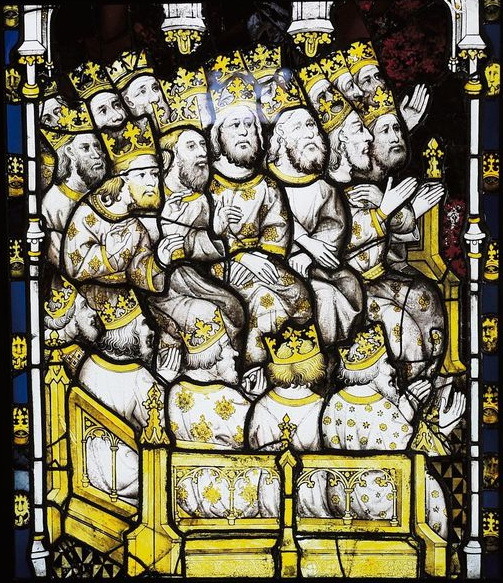
1405-1408 England. York Minster, Great East Window showing 24 Elders of the Apocalypse.

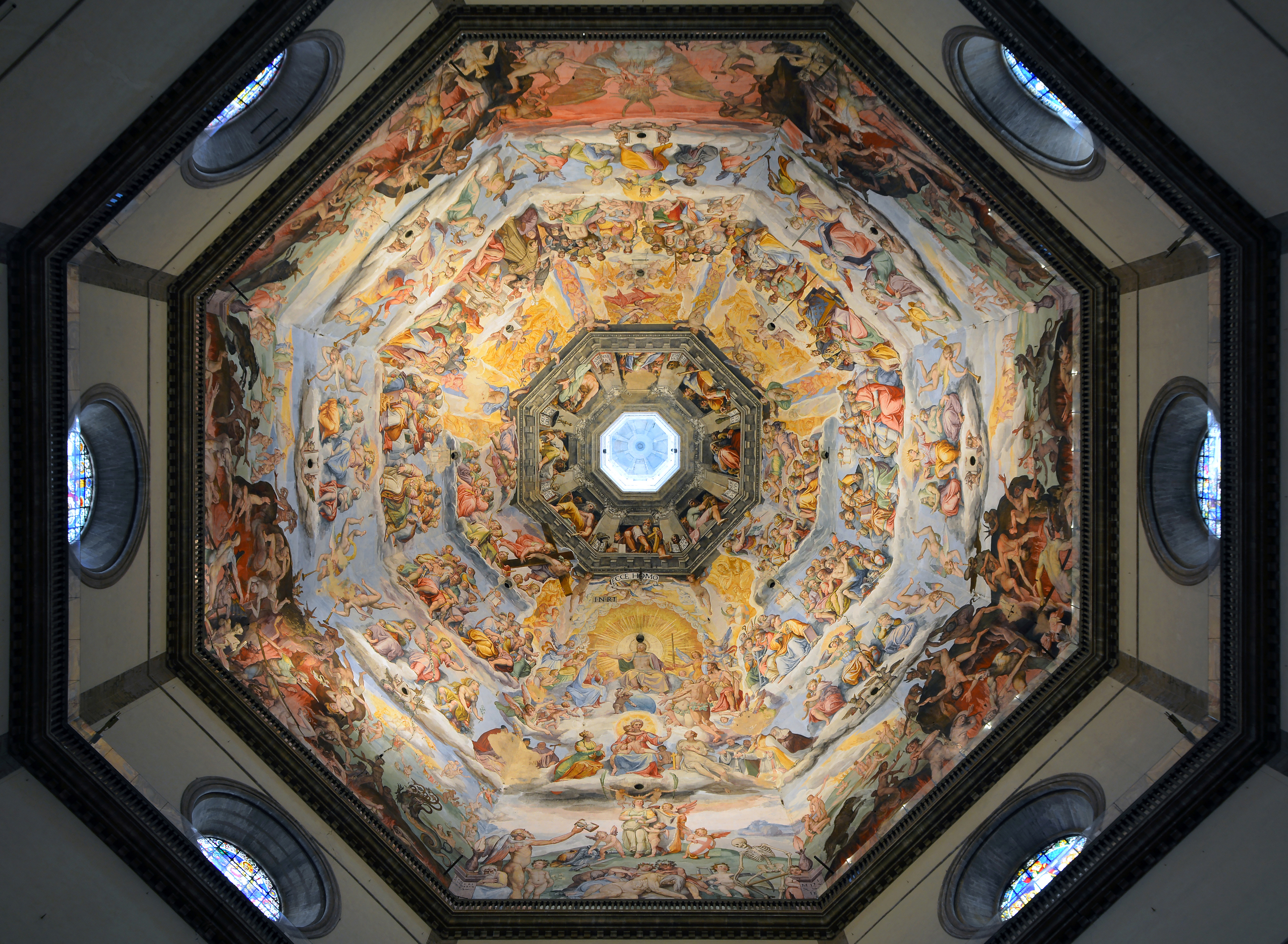
Circa 1430, Florence, Italy. Image of heaven with the Twenty-Four Elders looking down from vaulted center.

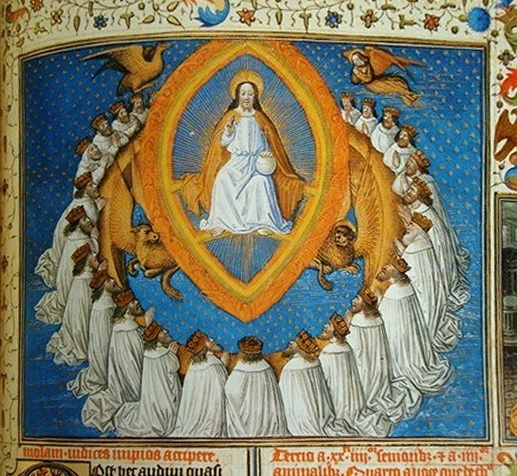
15th century A.D. Vision of God. 24 Elders of the Apocalypse gather around Christ. From the Figurative Apocalypse of the Dukes of Savoy.

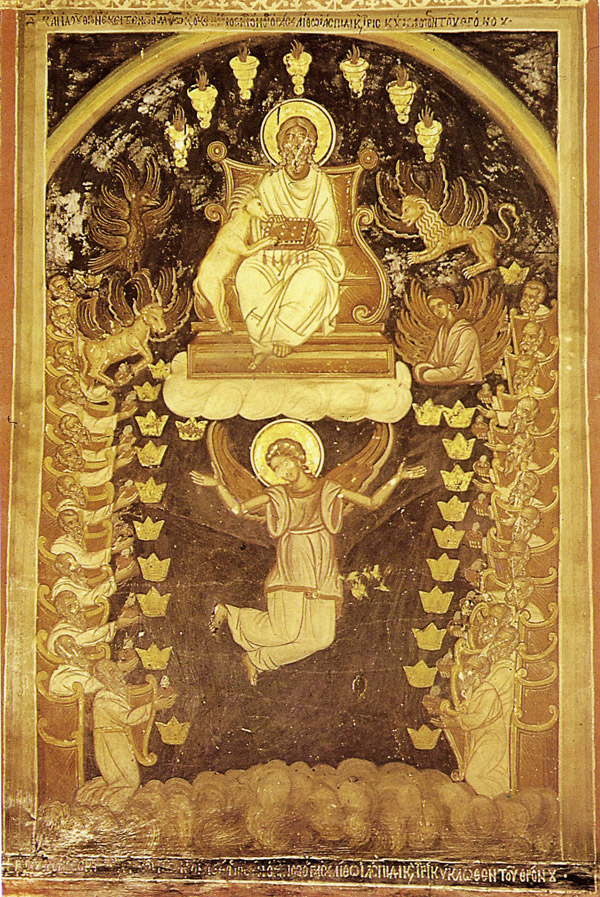
16th century A.D., Mount Athos, Greece. Apocalypse scente at the Dionysiou Monastery. The 24 Elders cast their crowns before God.

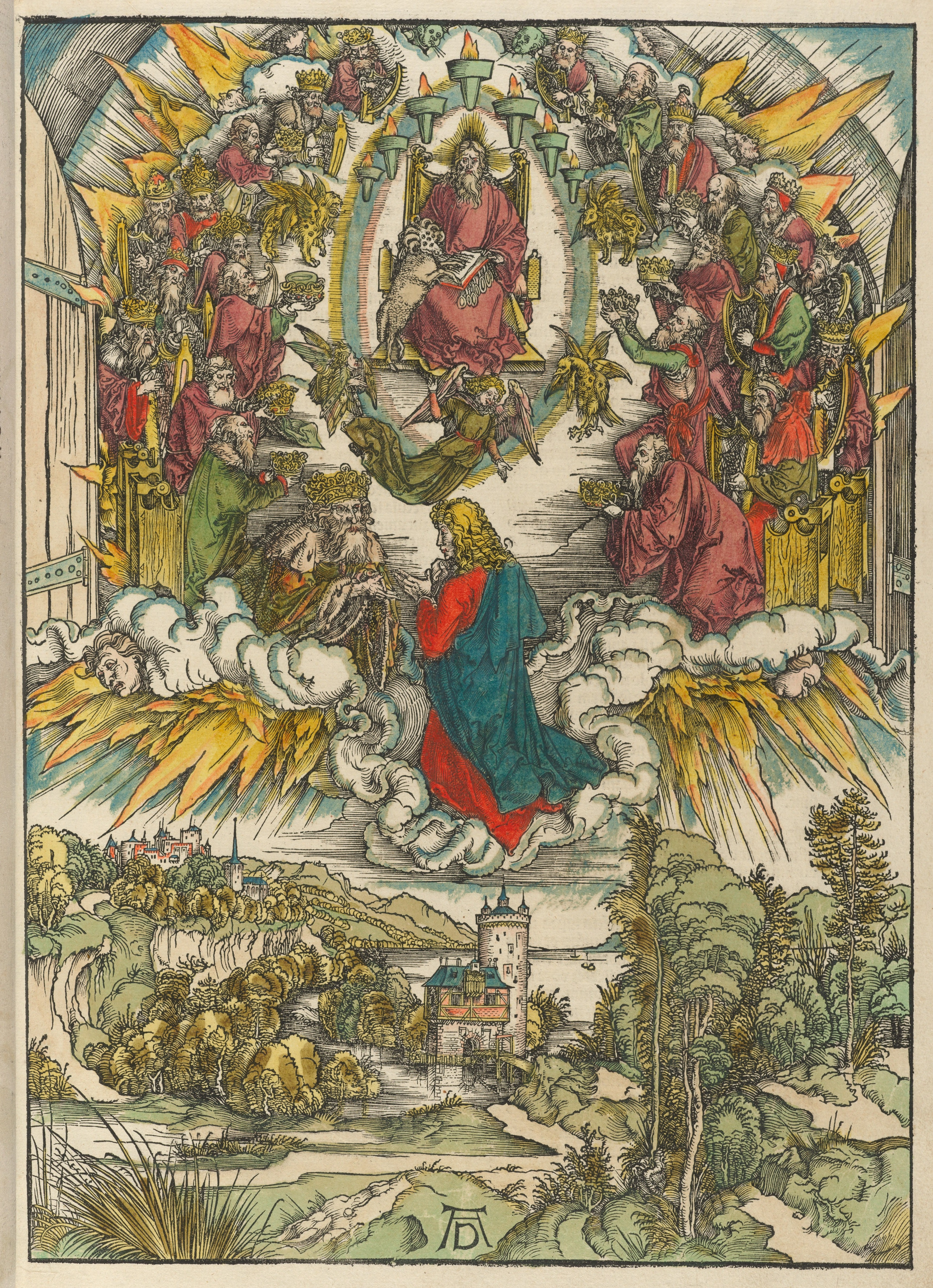
1498, Germany. Saint John kneeling before Christ and the Twenty-Four Elders. Engraving by

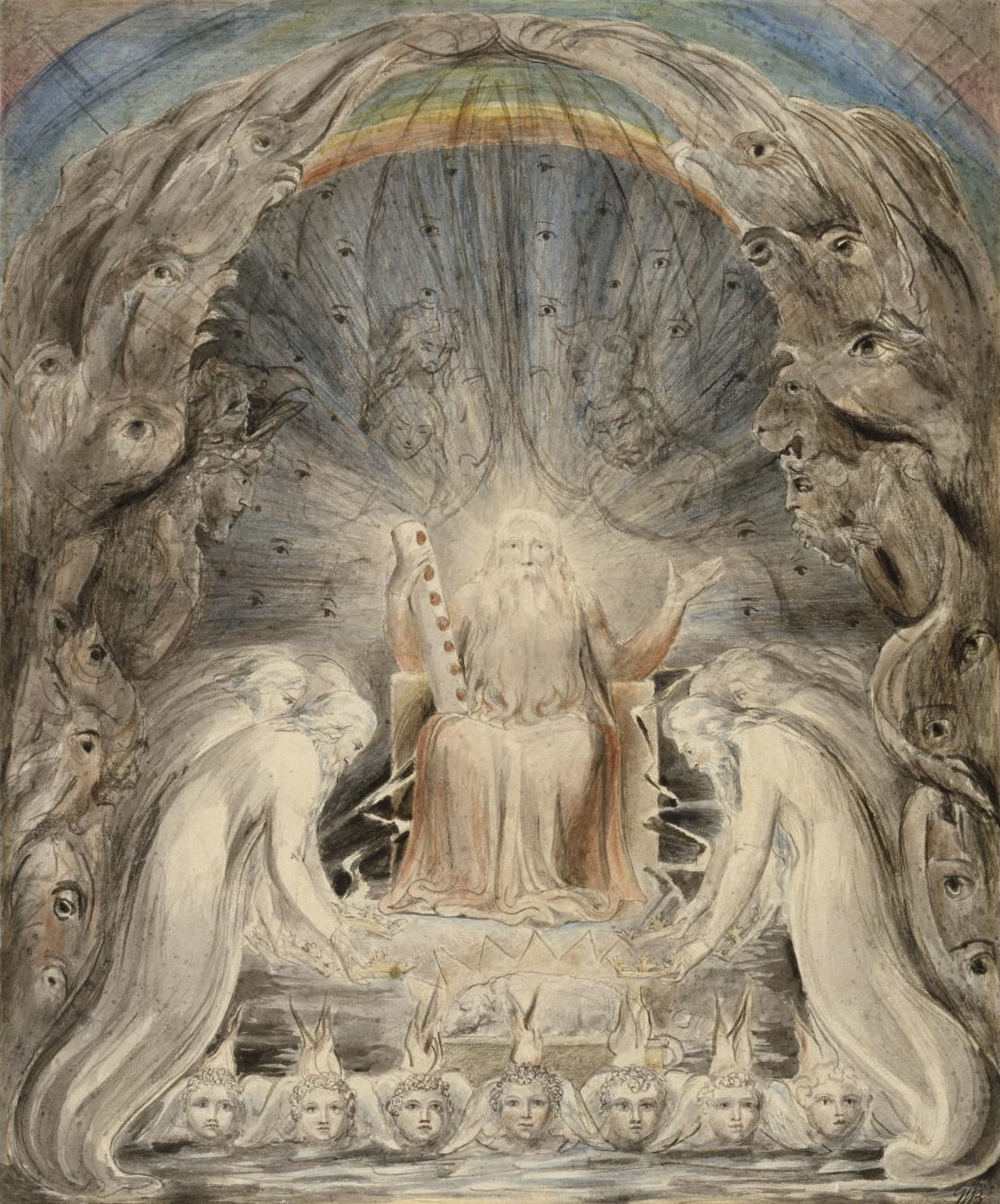
The Four and Twenty Elders Casting their Crowns before the Divine Throne, c. 1803–5. William Blake, Tate. 354 x 293 mm.

== Christian interpretation ==
The identity of the 24 elders has been subject of debate for centuries, some view them as angelic beings akin to humans but not representing human spirits. Others claim they are the twelve sons of Israel and the twelve apostles or some of the former together with certain prophets and biblical figures that were especially close to God such as Moses, Elijah, Enoch and Abraham.

== Non-Christian allegorical interpretation ==
Champat Rai Jain, a 20th-century Jain writer claimed that the "Four and Twenty Elders" mentioned in the Christian Bible are "Twenty-four Jain Tirthankaras". In his book, Jainism Christianity and Science, he wrote:

Briefly, the beasts represent the different kinds of souls that are embodied in the four elements (of matter), namely, the earth-bodied (represented by the lion, since he walks on earth), the air-bodied (represented by the eagle who flies in the air), the water-bodied (represented by the calf, which here is the young of the sea-mammals), and the fire-bodied (represented by the sun which is painted as the face of a man). Wings are a symbol for time, since it flies; and the number six is descriptive of the six aras (spokes) or a half-cycle in which four and twenty Tirthamkaras appear and preach the Truth. Plainly put, the significance of the secret teaching is only this that Life is Divine, and its divinity is manifested most perfectly and fully in the case of four and twenty Tirthamkaras, who appear in a half-cycle of time, consisting of six aras, and preach the Noble Truth to and for the benefit of the souls embodied in material bodies.

However, this is a view which comes out of Jainism. It doesn't come from the Bible or Christian tradition.

== Sources ==
- Jain, Champat Rai (1930). Jainism, Christianity and science. Allahabad: The Indian Press Ltd.
