= The Great Day of His Wrath =

1851–1853 painting by John Martin

The Great Day of His (Lord's – God of Abraham) Wrath
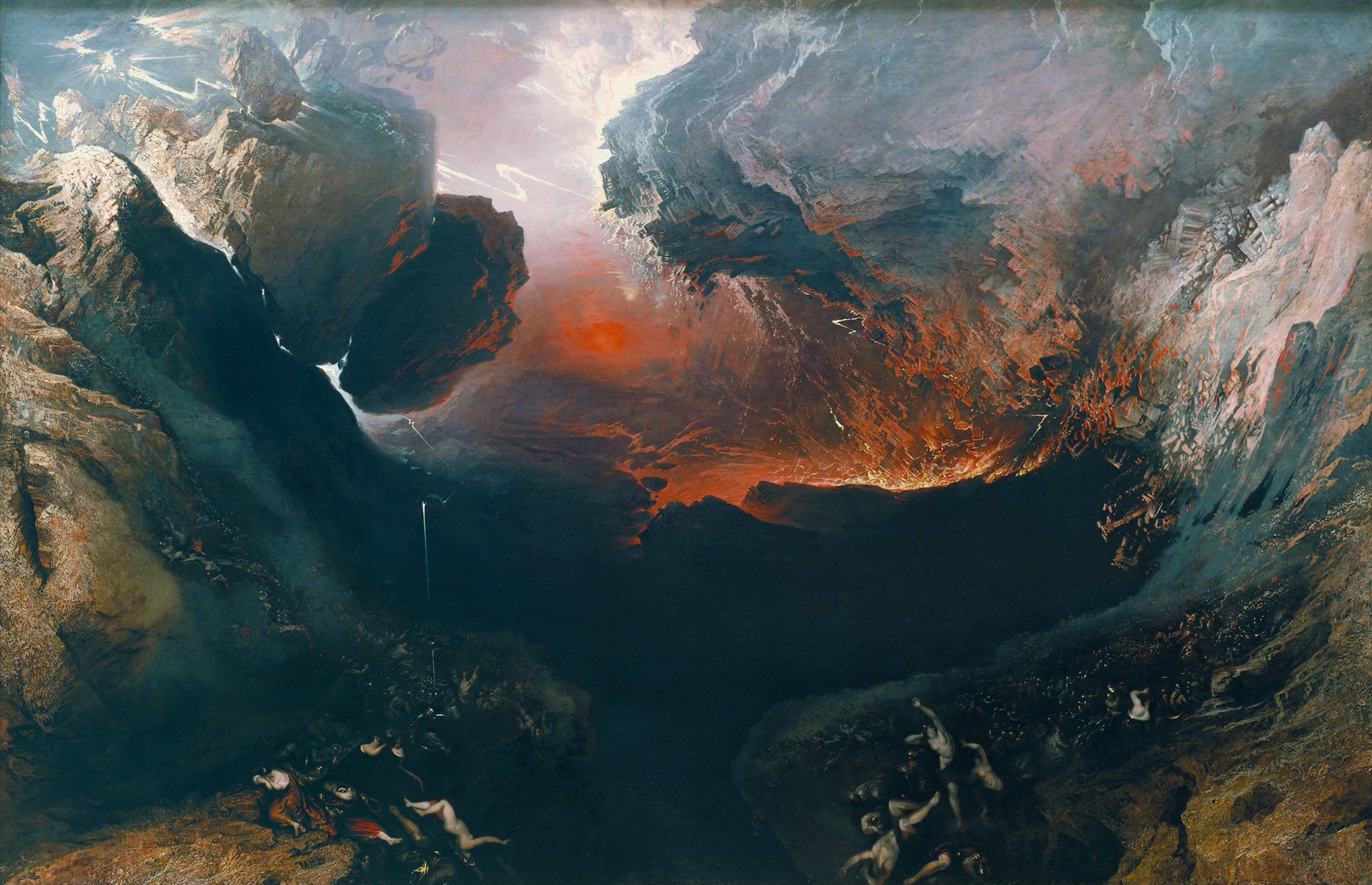
- Artist: John Martin
- Year: 1851–1853
- Medium: Oil on canvas
- Dimensions: 197 cm × 303 cm (78 in × 119 in)
- Location: Tate Britain, London

The End of the World, commonly known as The Great Day of His (Lord's – God of Abraham) Wrath, is an 1851–1853 oil painting on canvas by the English painter John Martin. Leopold Martin, John Martin's son, said that his father found the inspiration for this painting on a night journey through the Black Country. This has led some scholars to hold that the rapid industrialisation of England in the early nineteenth century influenced Martin.

The painting is one of three works that together form a triptych titled The Last Judgement.

== Description ==
According to Frances Carey, Deputy Keeper in the Department of Prints and Drawings, British Museum, the painting shows the destruction of Babylon and the material world by natural cataclysm. William Feaver, art critic of The Observer, believes that this painting pictures the collapse of Edinburgh in Scotland. Calton Hill, Arthur's Seat, and the Castle Rock, Feaver says, are falling together into the valley between them. However, Charles F. Stuckey, professor of Art History, Theory, and Criticism at the School of the Art Institute of Chicago, is skeptical about such connections, arguing that it has not been conclusively proved. Michael Freeman, Supernumerary Fellow and Lecturer in Human Geography at Mansfield College, describes the painting as follows:

Storms and volcanic eruptions, earthquakes and other natural disasters "swept like tidal waves through early nineteenth-century periodicals, broadsheets and panoramas". Catastrophic and apocalyptic visions acquired a remarkable common currency, the Malthusian spectre a constant reminder of the need for atonement. For some onlookers, Martin's most famous canvases of divine revelation seemed simultaneously to encode new geological and astronomical truths. This was ... powerfully demonstrated in The Great Day of his Wrath (1852), in which the Edinburgh of James Hutton, with its grand citadel, hilltop terraces and spectacular volcanic landscape, explodes outwards and appears suspended upside-down, flags still flying from its buildings and before crashing head-on into the valley below.

According to the Tate Gallery, the United Kingdom's national museum of British and Modern Art, the painting closely follows a portion of Revelation 6, a chapter from the New Testament of the Bible:

And I beheld when he had opened the sixth seal, and, lo, there was a great earthquake; and the sun became black as sackcloth of hair, and the moon became as blood;
And the stars of heaven fell unto the earth, even as a fig tree casteth her untimely figs, when she is shaken of a mighty wind.
And the heaven departed as a scroll when it is rolled together; and every mountain and island were moved out of their places.
And the kings of the earth, and the great men, and the rich men, and the chief captains, and the mighty men, and every bondman, and every free man, hid themselves in the dens and in the rocks of the mountains;
And said to the mountains and rocks, Fall on us, and hide us from the face of him that sitteth on the throne, and from the wrath of the Lamb:
For the great day of his wrath is come; and who shall be able to stand?

== Inspiration ==
Following the completion of a series of his last works (including The Destruction of Sodom and Gomorrah) and sending them to the Royal Academy, Martin started working on a group of three paintings that included The End of the World. According to Leopold Martin, John Martin's son, his father found the inspiration for this painting on a night journey through the Black Country. Based on this comment, F. D. Klingender argued that this image was in fact a "disguised response to the industrial scene", a claim Charles F. Stuckey is skeptical of. Frances Carey holds that John's underlying theme was the perceived connection between the rapid growth of London as a metropolis in the early nineteenth century, and the original growth of the Babylon civilisation and its final destruction. According to the Tate Gallery, Martin was inspired by the Book of Revelation from the New Testament.

== Martin's death and exhibitions of the painting ==
While painting, on 12 November 1853, Martin suffered an attack of paralysis, now thought to have been a stroke. The attack deprived him of the ability to talk and to control his right arm, and he died at Douglas, Isle of Man, on 17 February 1854. At the time of his death, his partially unfinished three paintings were being exhibited in Newcastle. After Martin's death, his last pictures (including The End of the World) were exhibited in "London and the chief cities in England attracting great crowds". The painting was engraved in 1854 (after Martin's death) by Thomas McLean, together with two other paintings by Martin, Plains of Heaven and The Last Judgment (a group of three 'judgment pictures'). Despite wide public reception, the three paintings were rejected as vulgar by the Royal Academy. In 1945, the painting was purchased by the Tate from the art dealer Robert Frank who had restored it.

== Reception ==
Some authors have used the painting as the front cover for their books; examples include Mass of the Apocalypse by Peter Dickinson and Studies in the Book of Revelation by Steve Moysie. It has also been used as the cover artwork for the ambient album Heresy by welsh musician Lustmord.
