= The Destruction of Sodom and Gomorrah =

1852 painting by John Martin

The Destruction of Sodom And Gomorrah
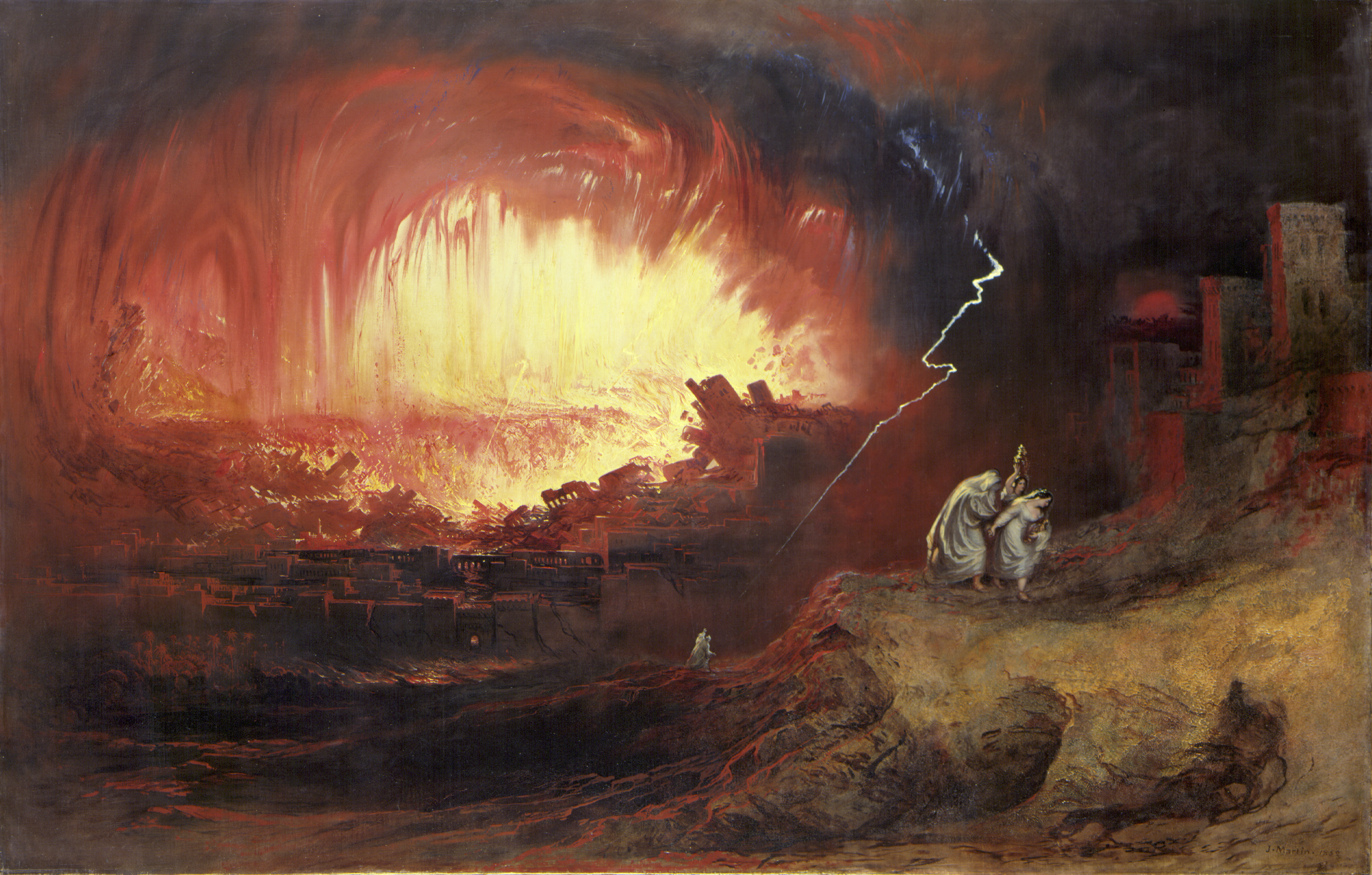
- Artist: John Martin
- Year: 1852
- Medium: oil on canvas
- Dimensions: 136.3 cm × 212.3 cm (53.7 in × 83.6 in)
- Location: Laing Art Gallery, Newcastle upon Tyne

The Destruction of Sodom and Gomorrah is a painting by the English painter John Martin, from 1852. It is in the collection of the Laing Art Gallery in Newcastle upon Tyne.

== History ==
Martin's painting, shows the biblical story of the destruction of the two cities of Sodom and Gomorrah, which was God's punishment for the two cities for people's immoral behavior. Only Lot and his daughters were saved. Lot's wife disobeyed God's instruction not to look back, and was turned into a pillar of salt. The fiery red color is characteristic of John Martin's dramatic scenes of destruction. The swirling storm in heaven was also a frequent feature of his paintings.

== Apocalyptic theme ==
Several other of Martin's paintings contain apocalyptic tendencies, including the Fall of Babylon (1831), The Fall of Nineveh, Divine vengeance, Pandemonium (1841) and The Eve of the Deluge (1840).

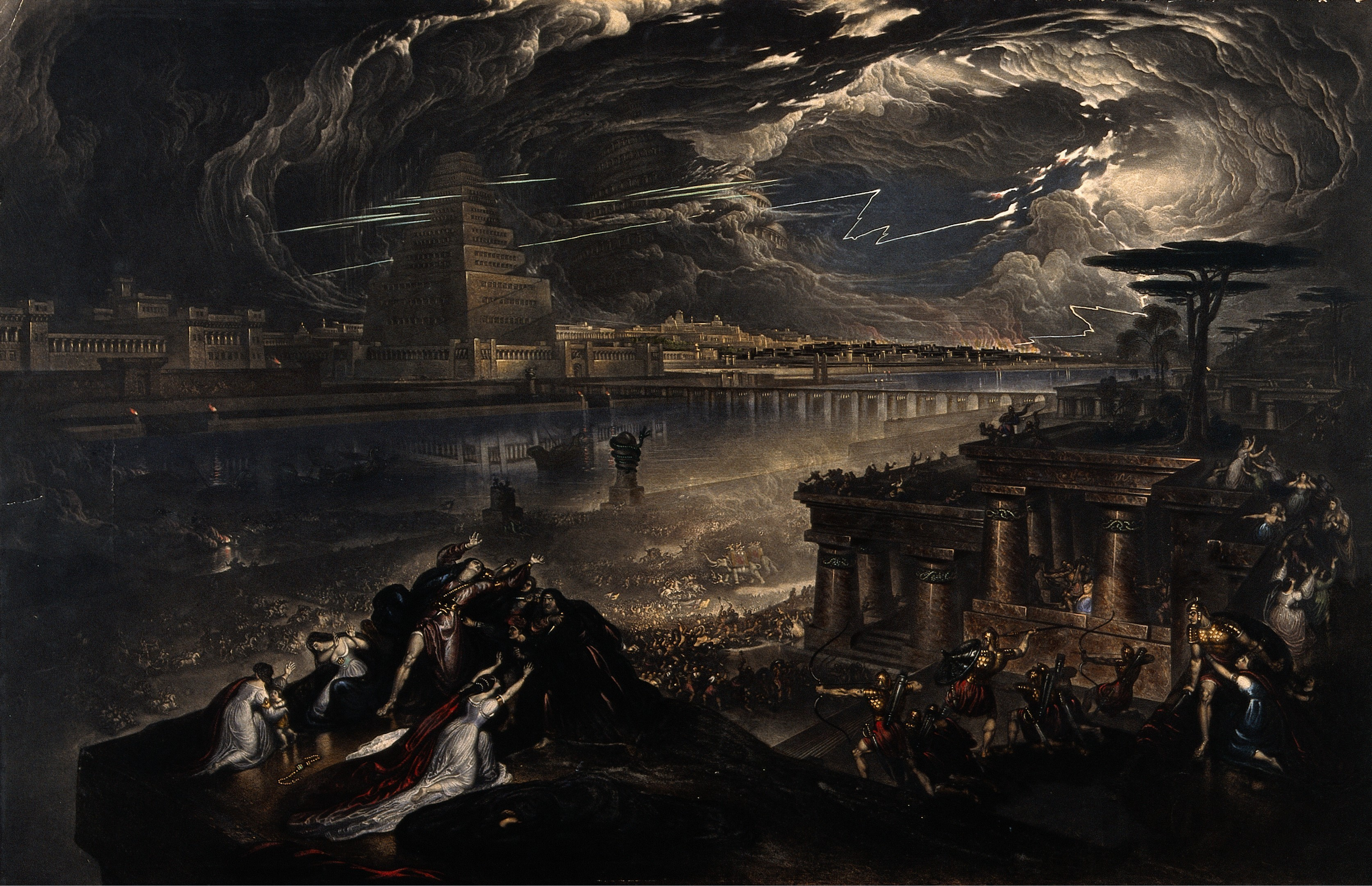
The Fall of Babylon, 1831

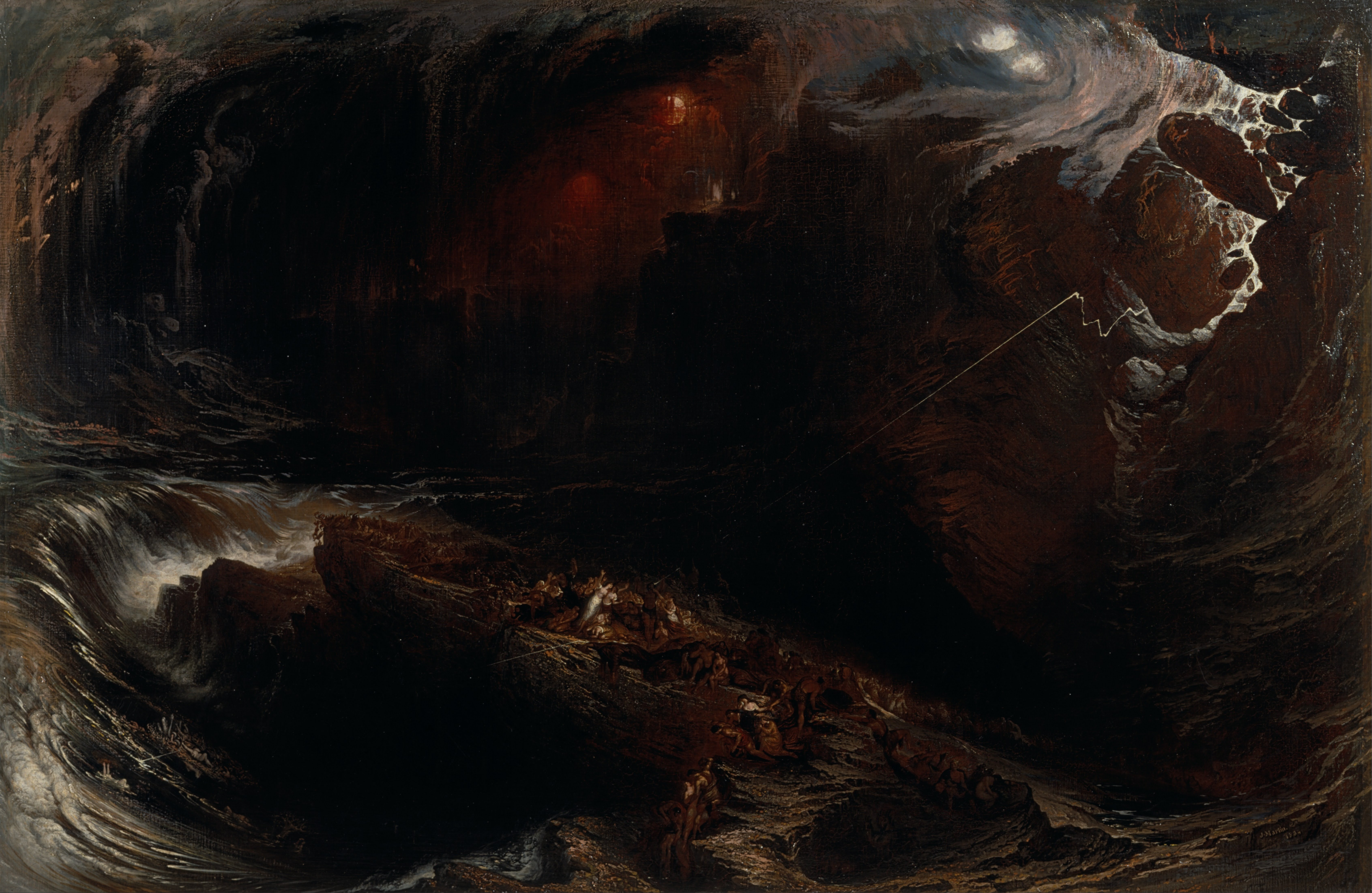
The Deluge, 1834, Yale Center for British Art

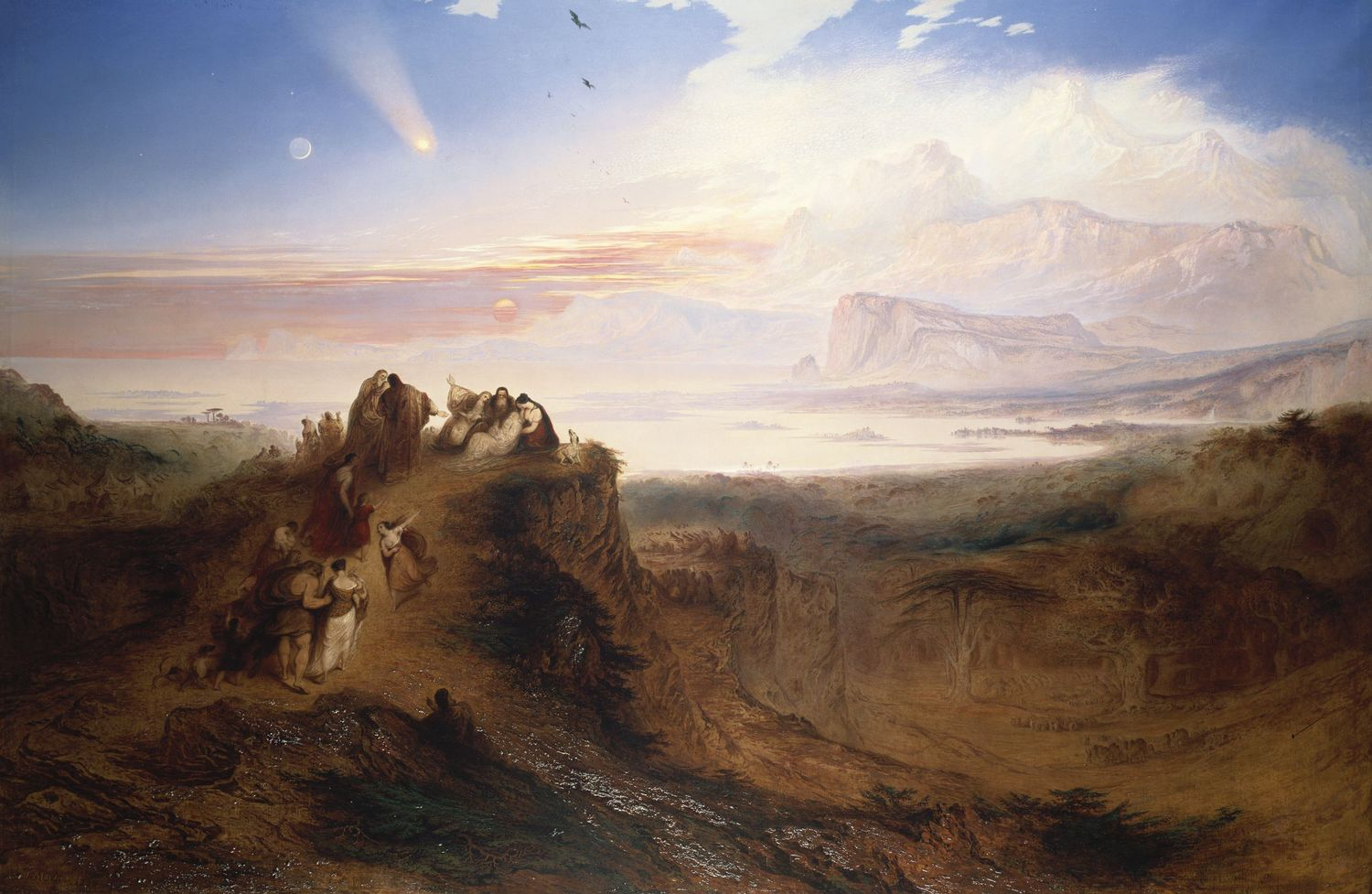
The Eve of the Deluge, 1840, Windsor Castle

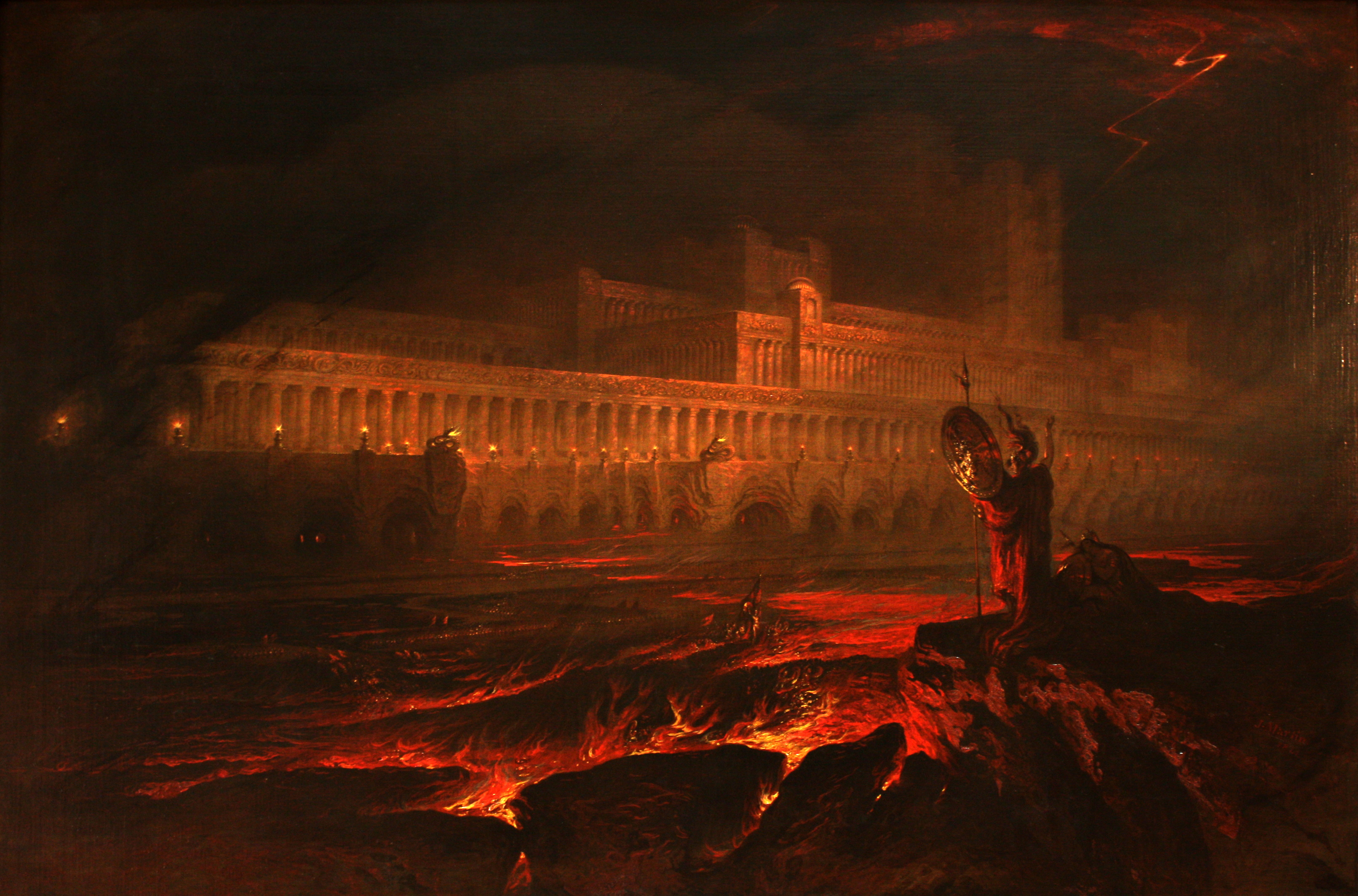
Pandemonium, 1841, Louvre

== Artist ==
Many regarded Martin while he lived as a great British artist, surpassed only by his older contemporary colleague J. M. W. Turner, with whom he competed for recognition. But John Martin's reputation declined after his death.
