= Hagar in the Wilderness =

Painting by Jean-Baptiste-Camille Corot

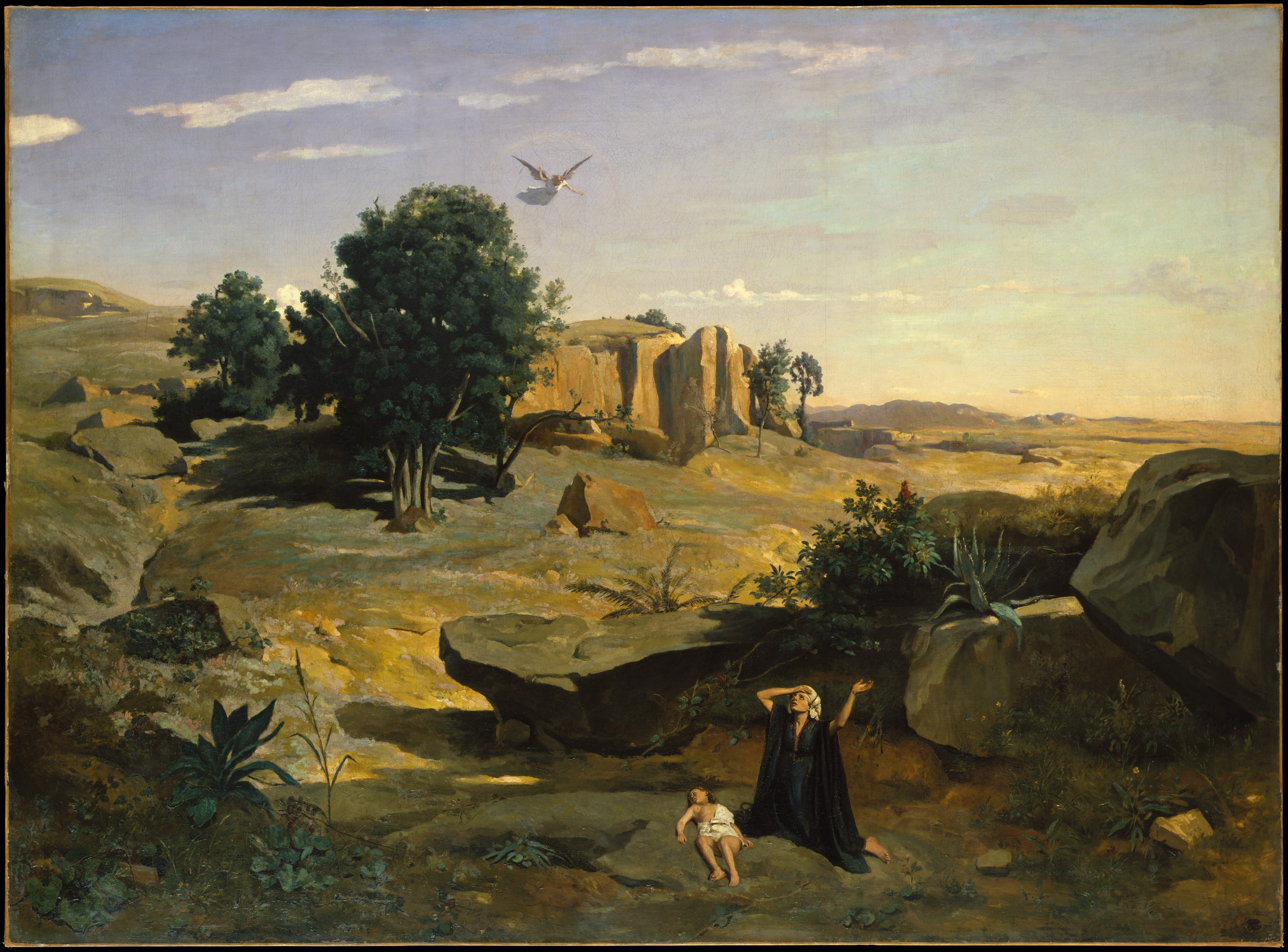
- Artist: Camille Corot
- Year: 1835
- Medium: Oil on canvas
- Dimensions: 180.3 cm × 270.5 cm (71.0 in × 106.5 in)
- Location: Metropolitan Museum of Art, New York
- Accession: 38.64

Hagar in the Wilderness is an oil-on-canvas painting by the French artist Camille Corot, created in 1835. The picture was displayed at the Salon of 1835 held in Paris. It is in the collection of the Metropolitan Museum of Art, in New York.

== Description ==
The painting depicts the biblical figure Hagar as she wanders with her son Ishmael through the wilderness of Beersheba. The painting renders the moment in which "Hagar is stretching her arm up to heaven, desperately pleading for help", and they experience divine salvation, seen via the inclusion of an angel in the back center of the painting. Much of the landscape seen in the work is derived from Corot's earlier nature studies.
