= Portrait of Louis-Mathieu Molé =

Painting by Jean-Auguste-Dominique Ingres

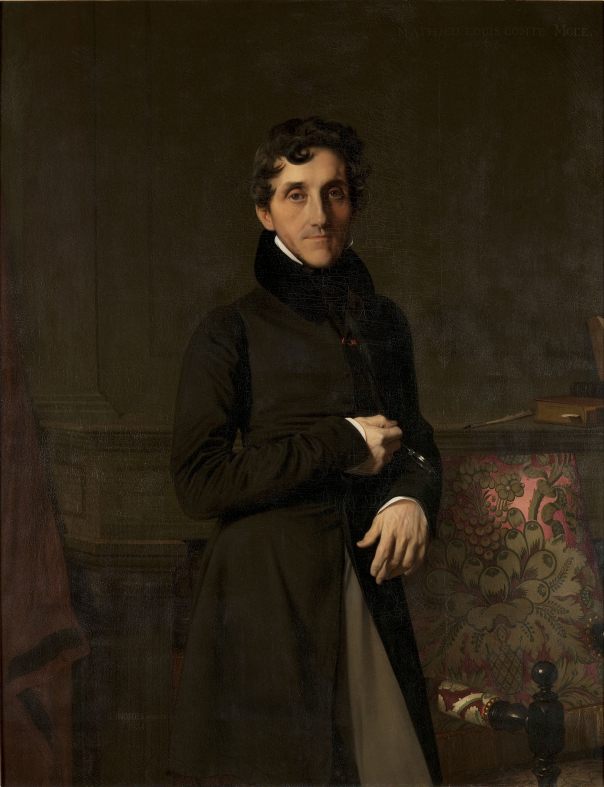
- Artist: Jean-Auguste-Dominique Ingres
- Year: 1834
- Type: Oil on canvas, portrait painting
- Dimensions: 147 cm × 114 cm (58 in × 45 in)
- Location: Louvre, Paris

Portrait of Louis-Mathieu Molé is an 1834 portrait painting by the French artist Jean-Auguste-Dominique Ingres depicting the politician Louis-Mathieu Molé. Molé served twice as Prime Minister of France during the July Monarchy of Louis Philippe I, as a member of the conservative Resistance Party. He held a number of other positions during his career including Minister of Justice under Napoleon and was also briefly Foreign Minister. His second spell as premier came just before the Revolution of 1848.

Ingres exhibited the portrait in his own studio, and was then commanded to bring it to Tuileries Palace for the royal family to view. While he refused to submit it the Salon of 1835 it was later exhibited at the Salon of 1855 as part of the Exposition Universelle. Today it is in the collection of the Louvre in Paris, having hung for many years in the Château de Champlâtreux.

== See also ==
- List of paintings by Jean-Auguste-Dominique Ingres

== Bibliography ==
- Jones, Peter. The 1848 Revolutions. Routledge, 2013.
- Shelton, Andrew Carrington. Ingres and His Critics. Cambridge University Press, 2005.
- Tinterow, Gary. Portraits by Ingres: Image of an Epoch. New York: Metropolitan Museum of Art, 1999
