= Salon of 1835 =

1835 art exhibition in Paris

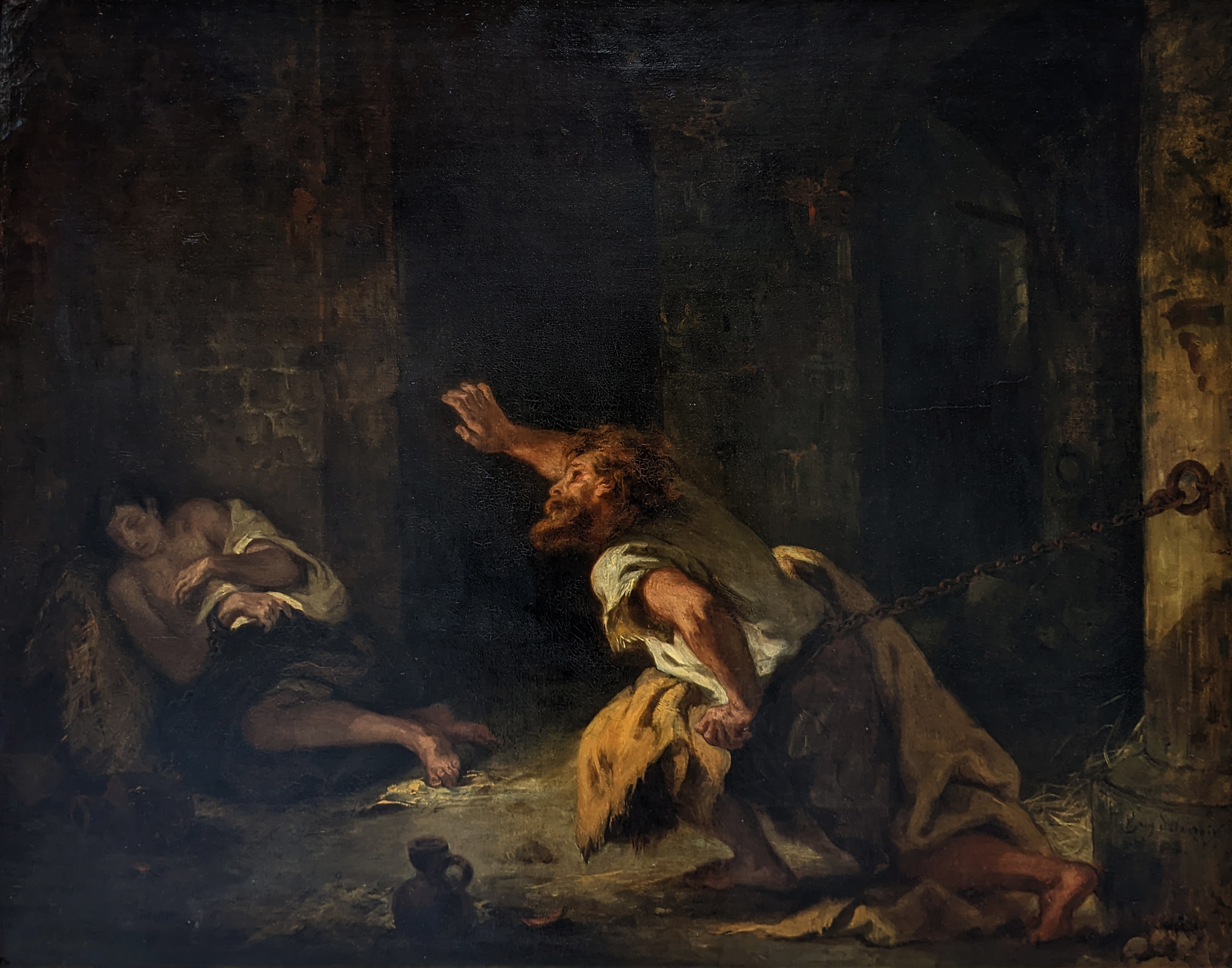
The Prisoner of Chillon by Eugène Delacroix

The Salon of 1835 was an art exhibition held at the Louvre in Paris. It was staged during the July Monarchy and was part of the tradition of Salons dating back to the 17th century. Since the Salon of 1833, the exhibitions had been held annually.

Notable amongst the works on display was Paul Delaroche's history painting The Assassination of the Duke of Guise, while Henri Decaisne submitted a painting featuring a scene from the life of the 16th century Duke of Guise. Eugène Delacroix exhibited The Prisoner of Chillon, based on a poem by Lord Byron. Jules Dupré, one of the Barbizon School influenced by John Constable, submitted a landscape painting, View of the Pastures of the Limousin.

Antoine-Jean Gros, a leading painter stretching back to the Napoleonic era, displayed the Neoclassical Hercules and Diomedes. Its critical failure led to him committing suicide the same year. Jean-Auguste-Dominique Ingres, who had exhibited at the Salon for several decades, refused a request to submit his Portrait of Louis-Mathieu Molé; Molé was a politician who would soon become Prime Minister, having taken over as director of the French Academy in Rome. The previous director Horace Vernet displayed the biblical Rebecca at the Well.

There was a sharp drop in the number of prints and lithographs exhibited.

It was followed by the Salon of 1836.

== Gallery ==
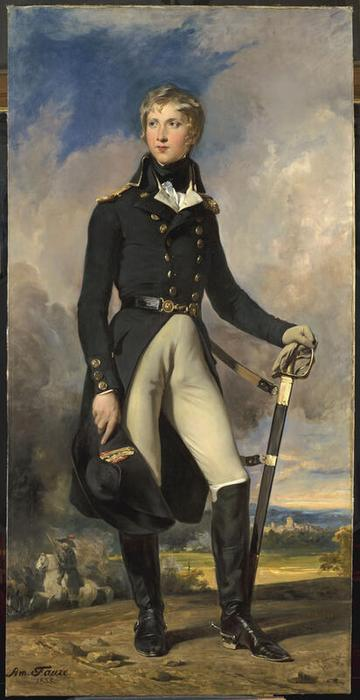
Portrait of the Antoine Philippe, Duke of Montpensier by Amédée Faure

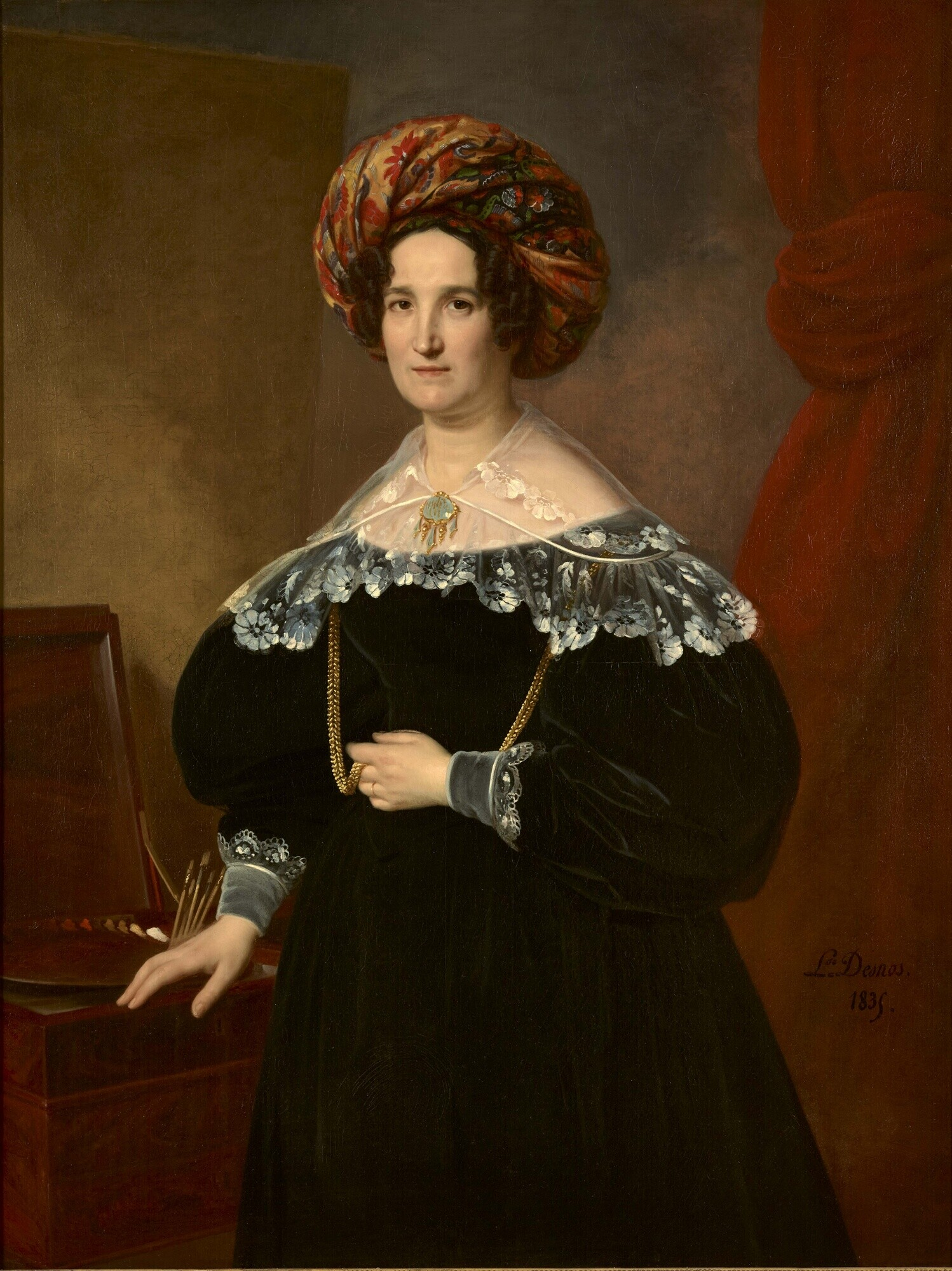
Portrait of Louise Hersent by Louise Adélaïde Desnos

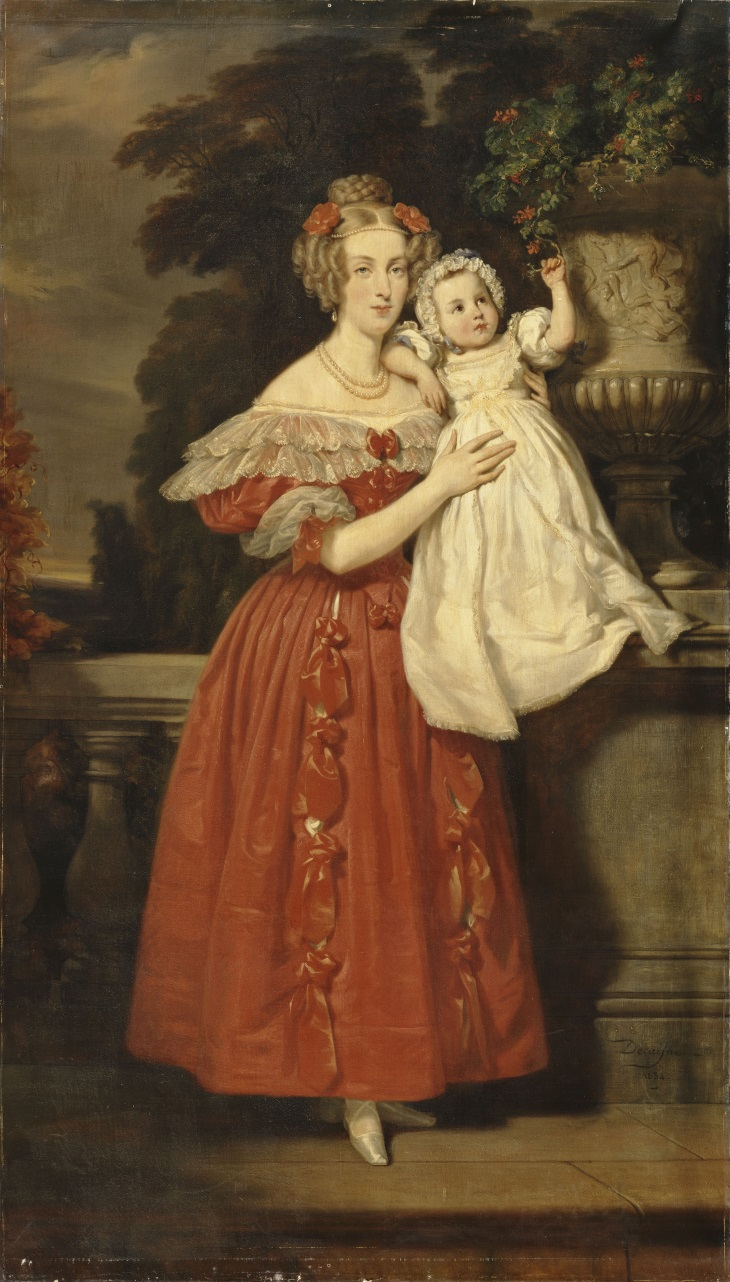
Louise, Queen of the Belgians with her son Louis-Philippe by Henri Decaisne

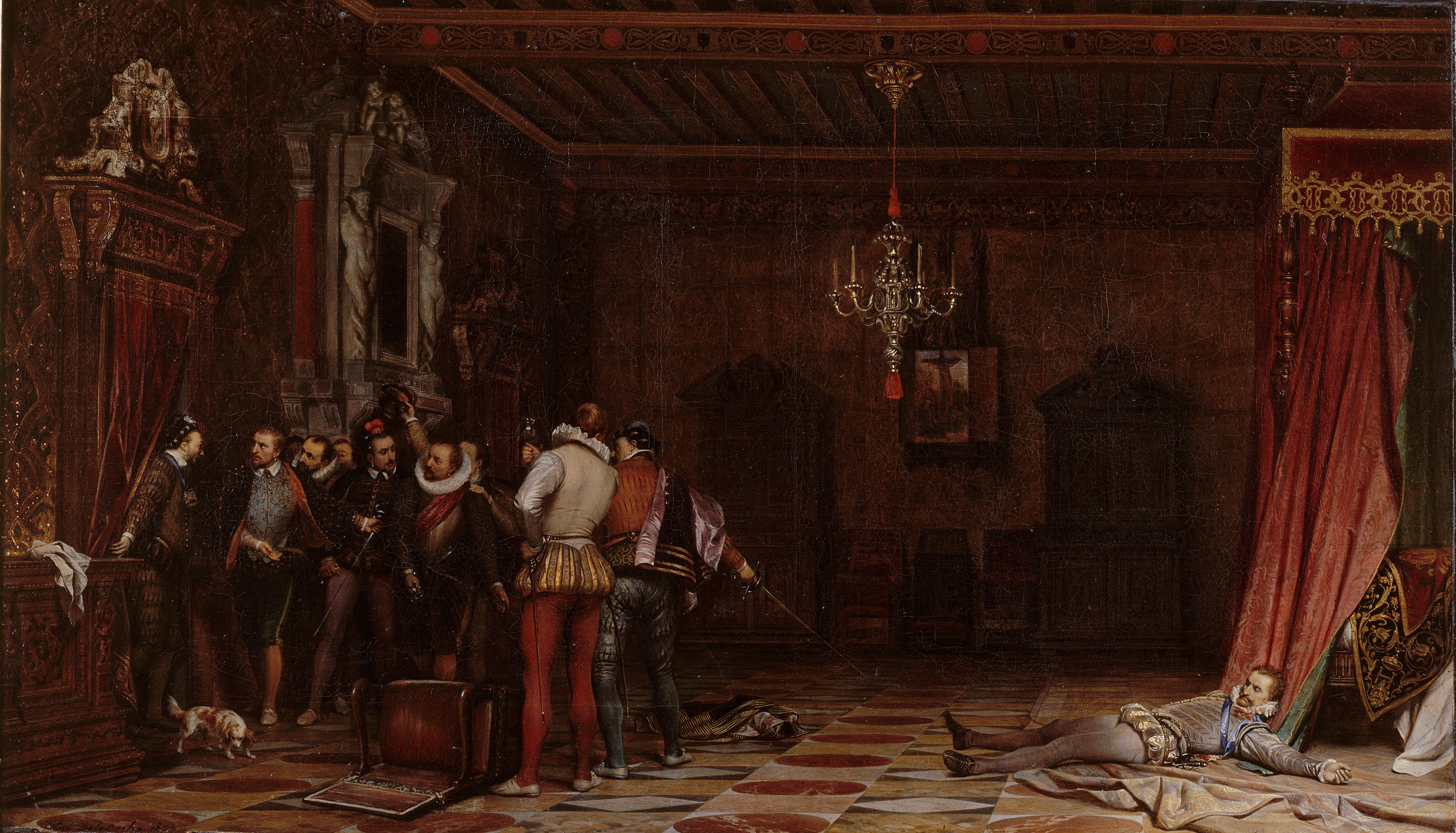
The Assassination of the Duke of Guise by Paul Delaroche

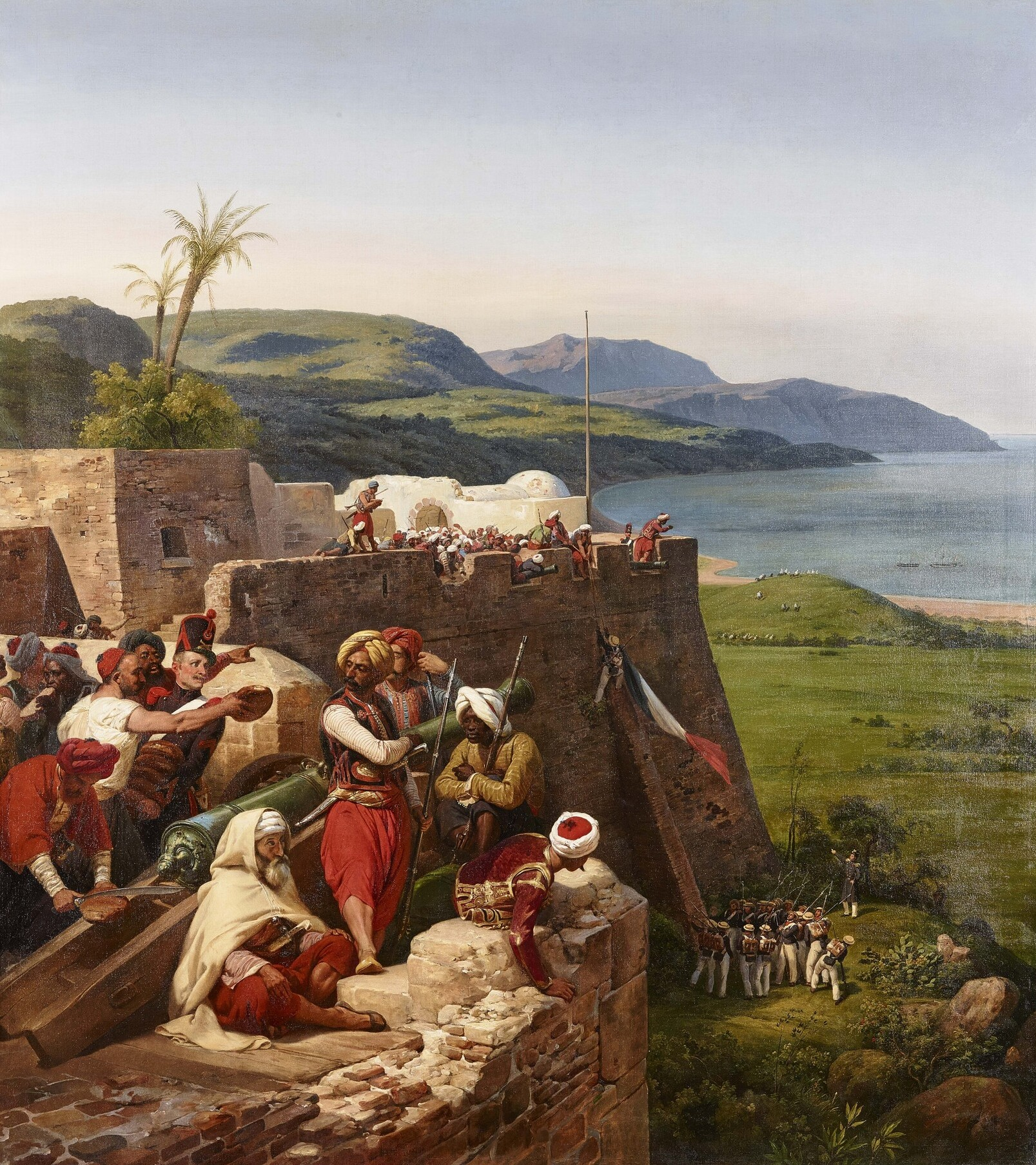
The Capture of Bône by Horace Vernet

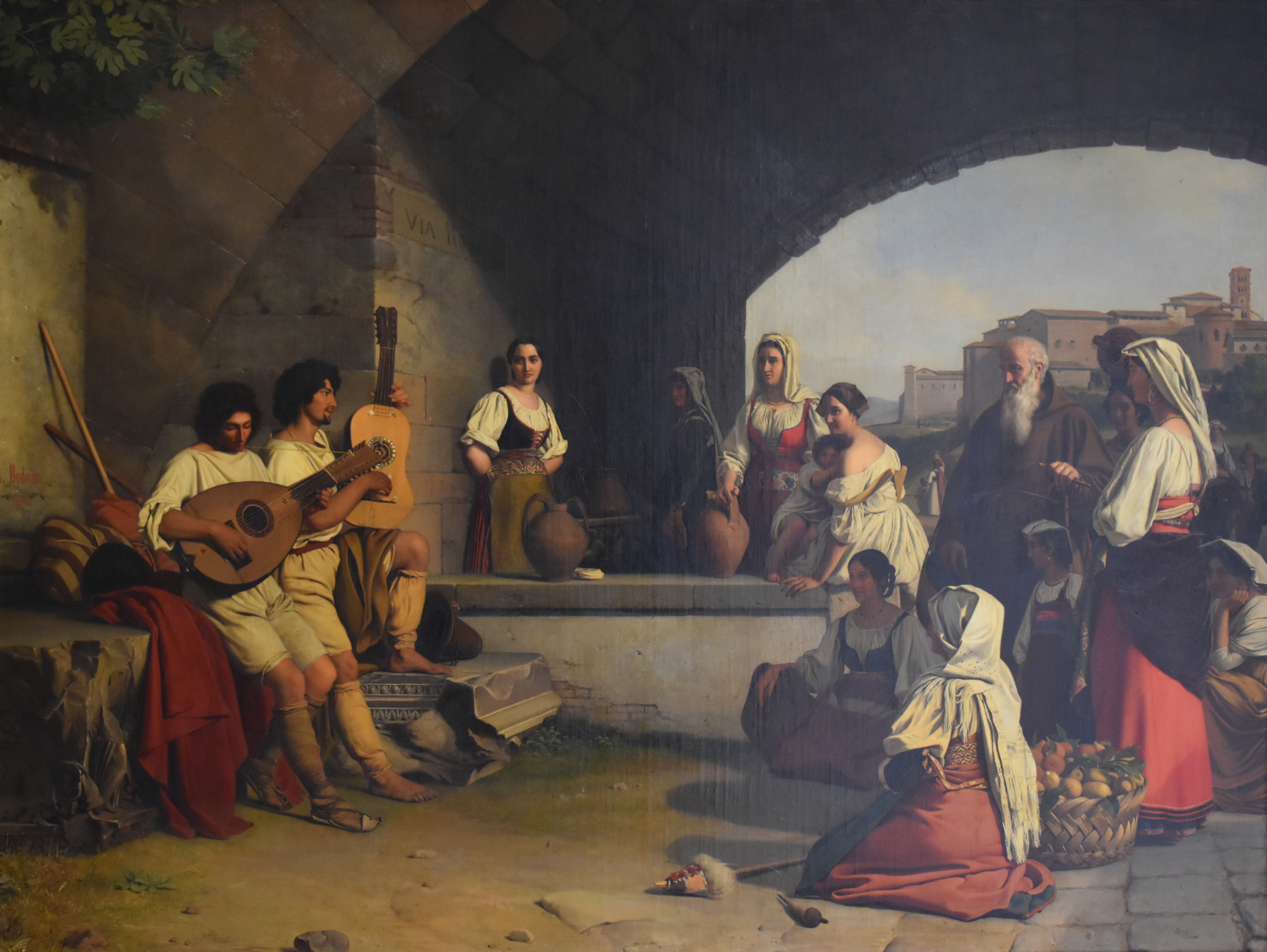
The Lute Players by Guillaume Bodinier

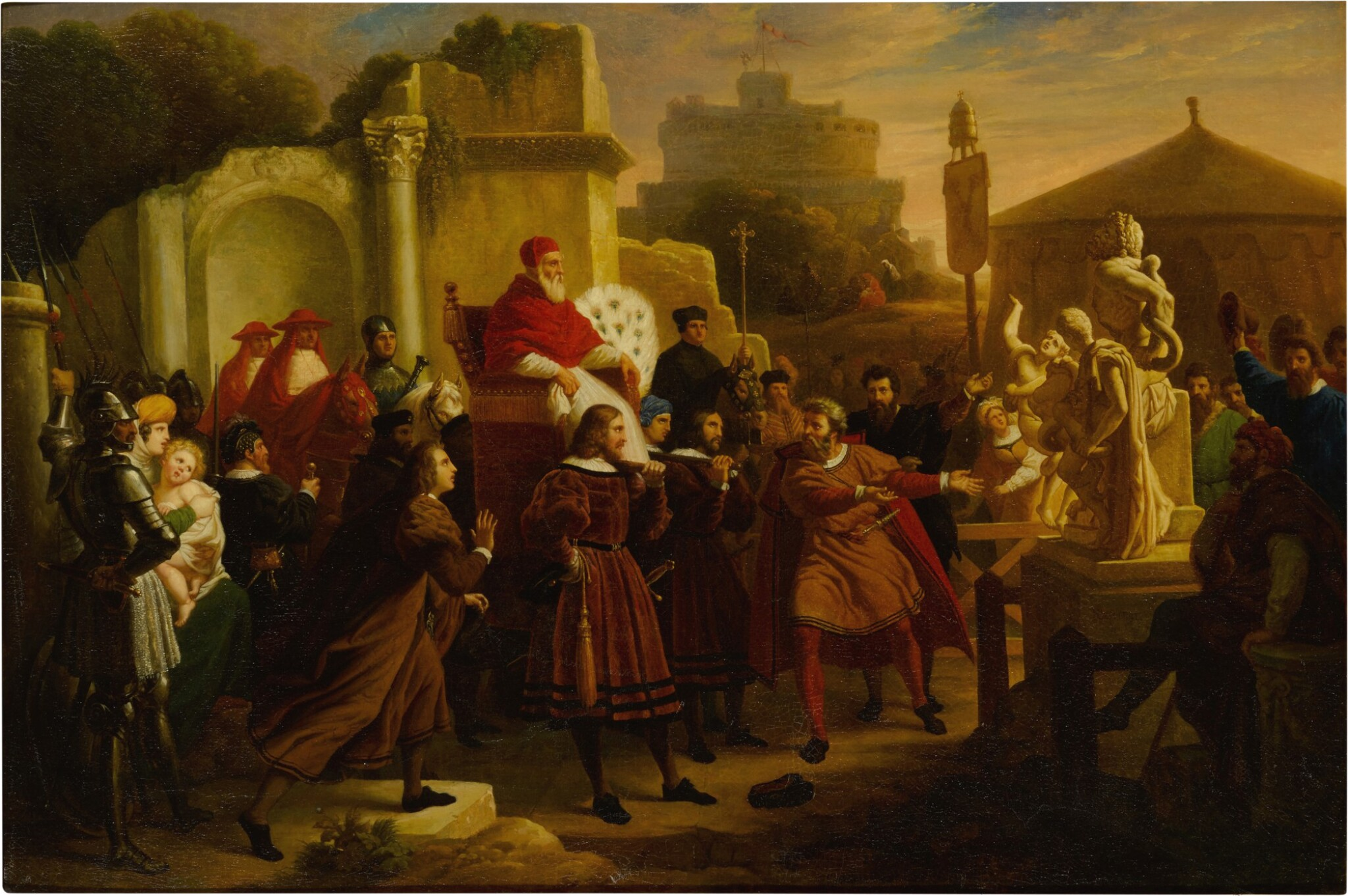
The Discovery of the Laocoon by Pierre-Nolasque Bergeret

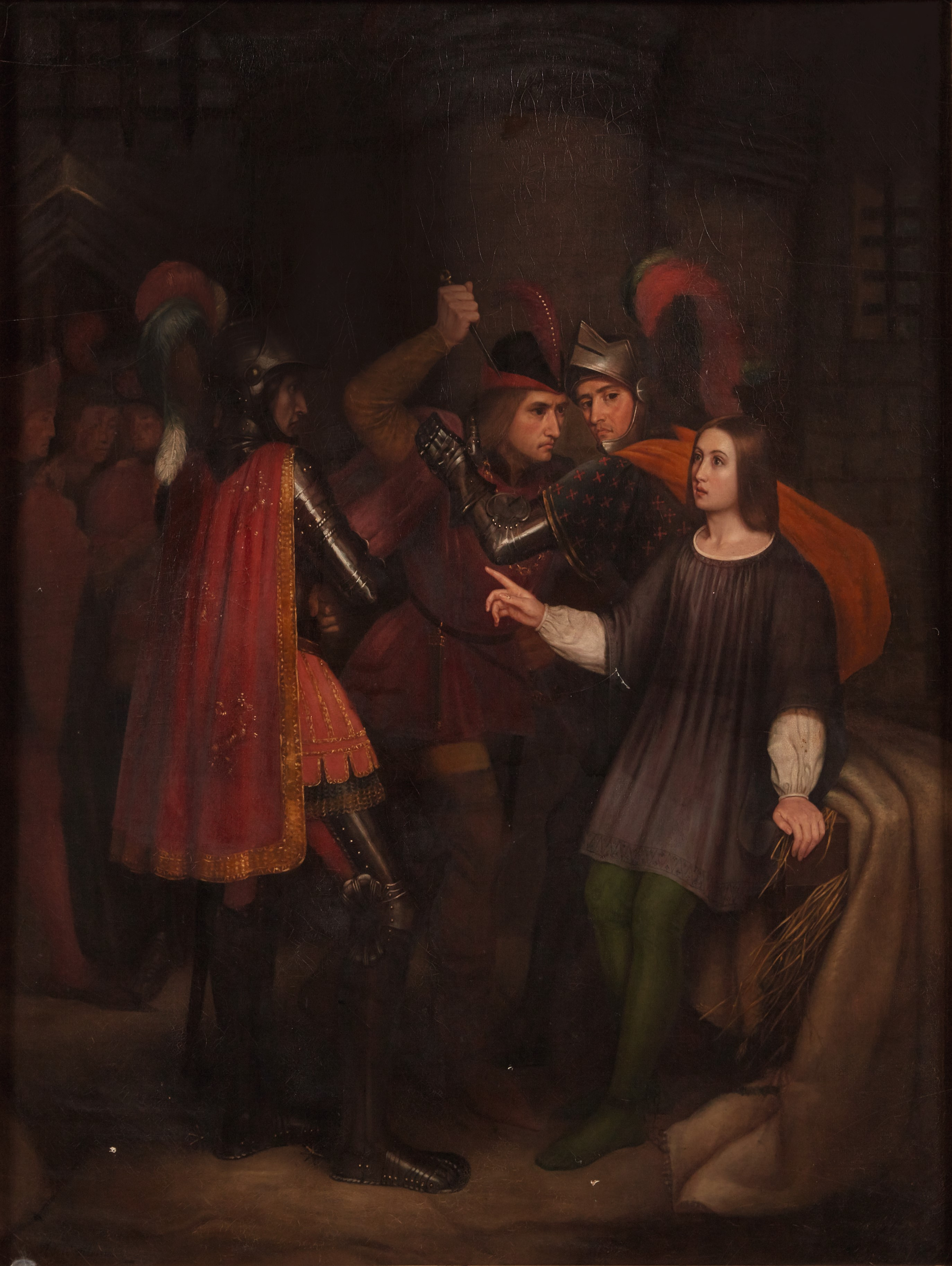
The Arrest of Joan of Arc by Adèle Martin

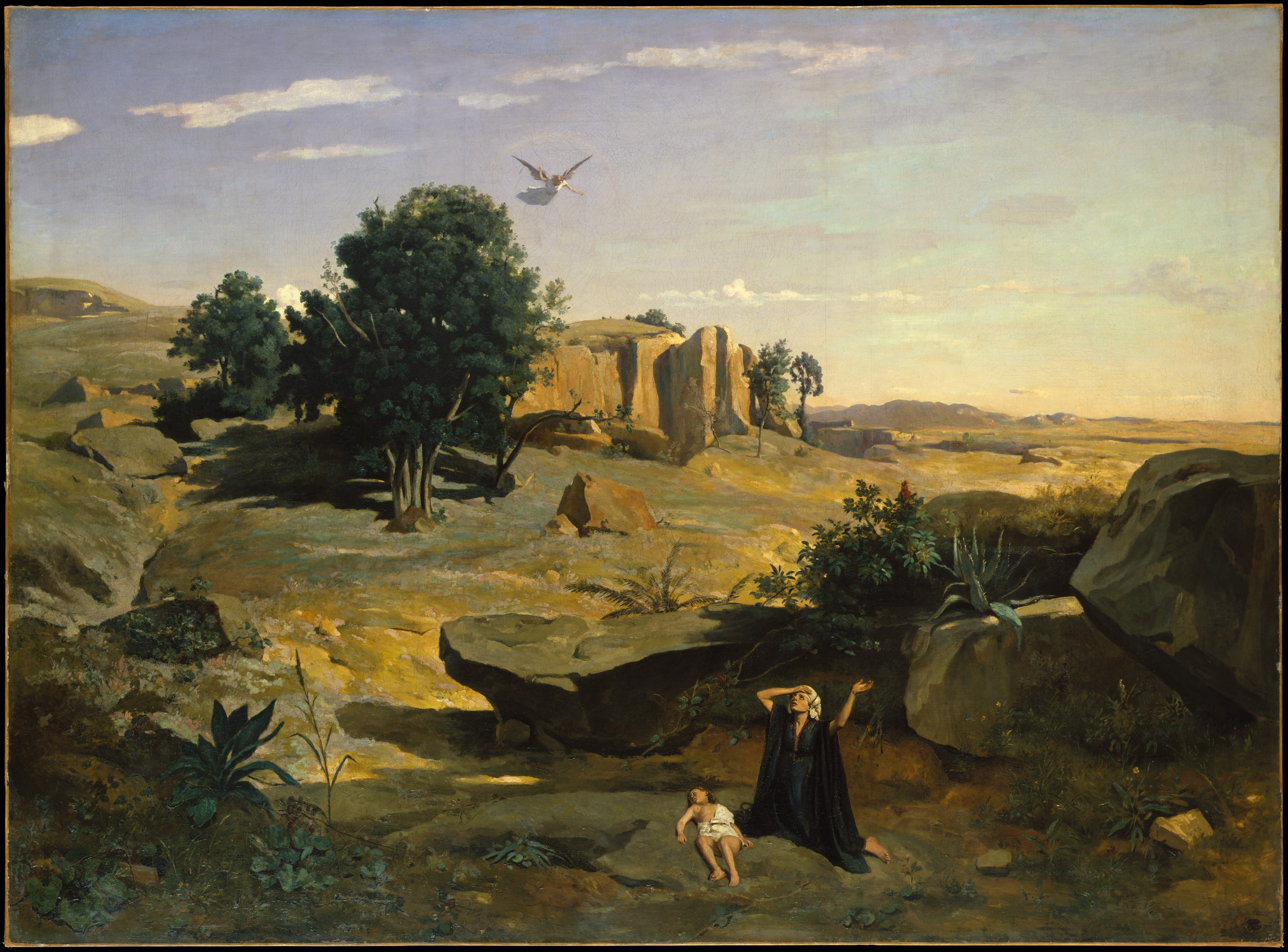
Hagar in the Wilderness by Jean-Baptiste-Camille Corot

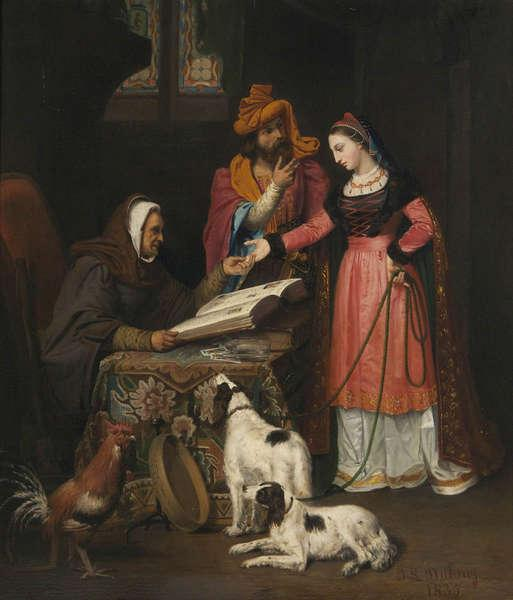
Isabeau of Bavaria and the Duke of Burgundy by Jean-Louis Dulong

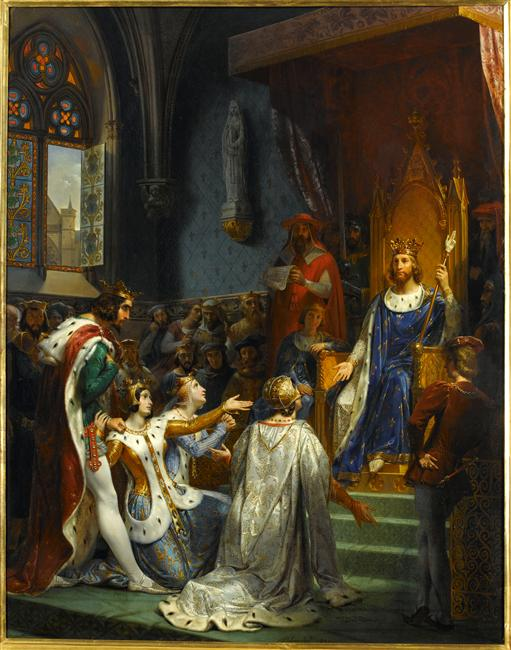
John II the Good receives the submission of Charles II the Bad at the Louvre by Merry-Joseph Blondel

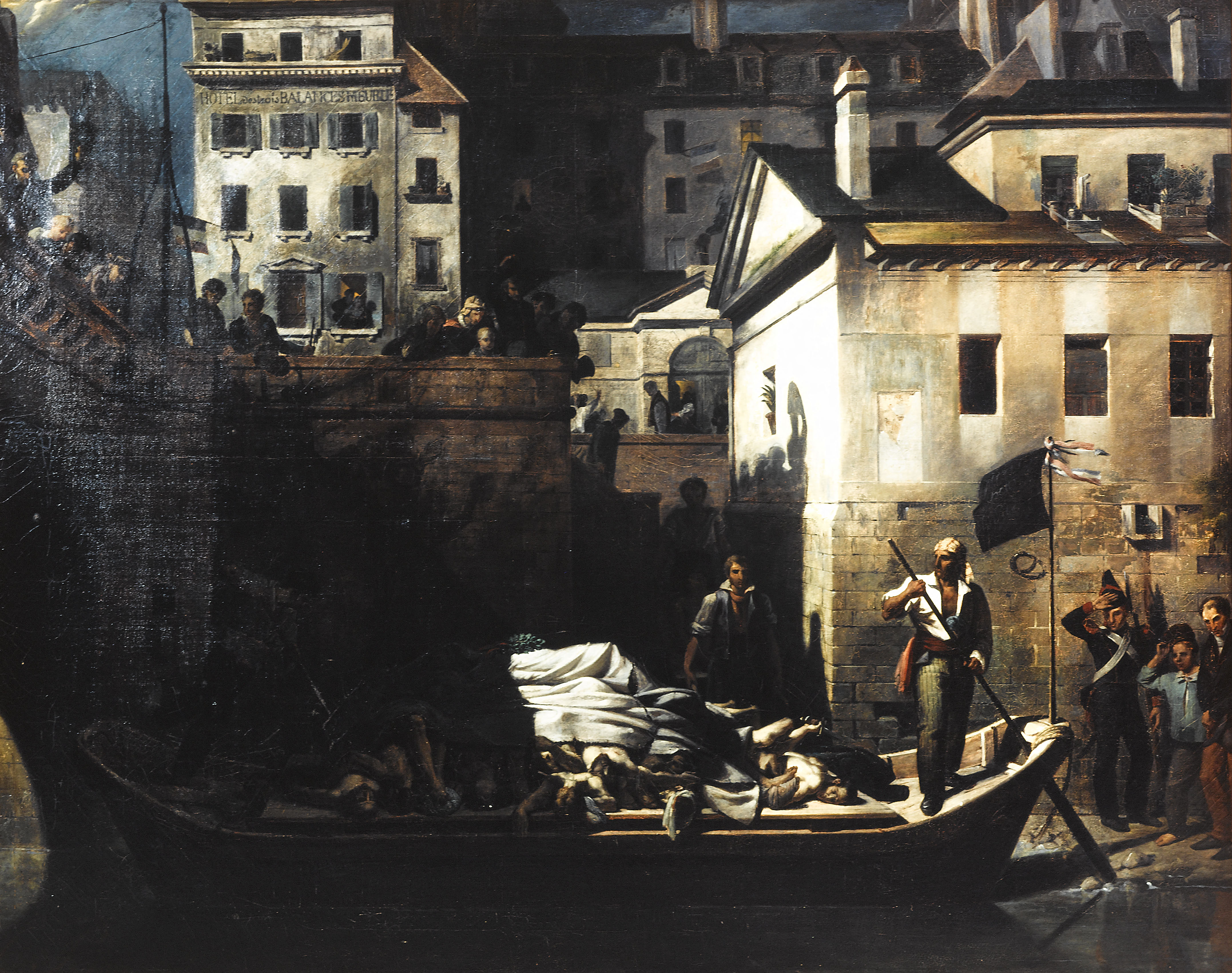
Transport by Night of Corpses from the July Revolution by Louis-Alexandre Péron

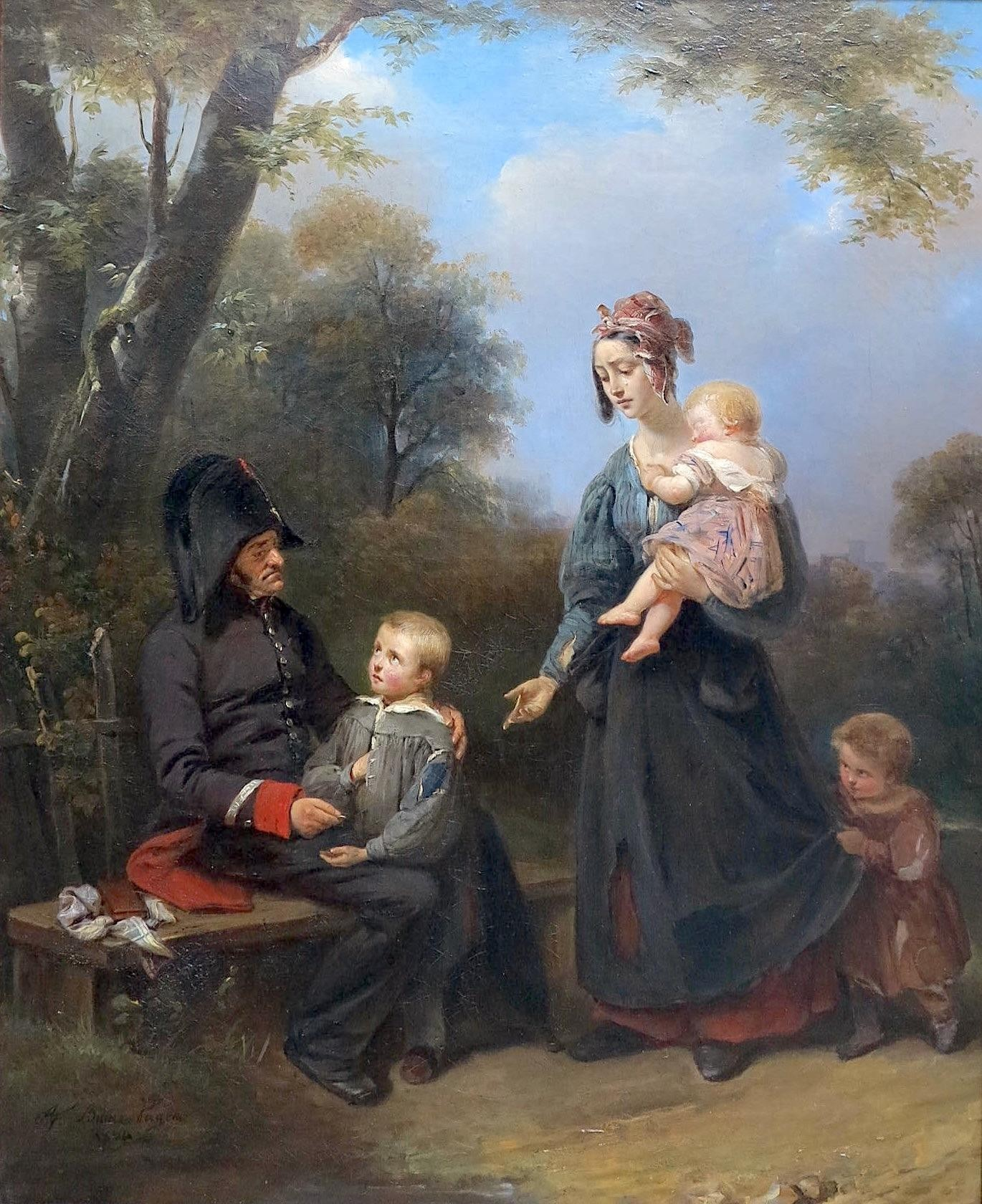
The Invalid's Alms by Aimée Brune-Pagès

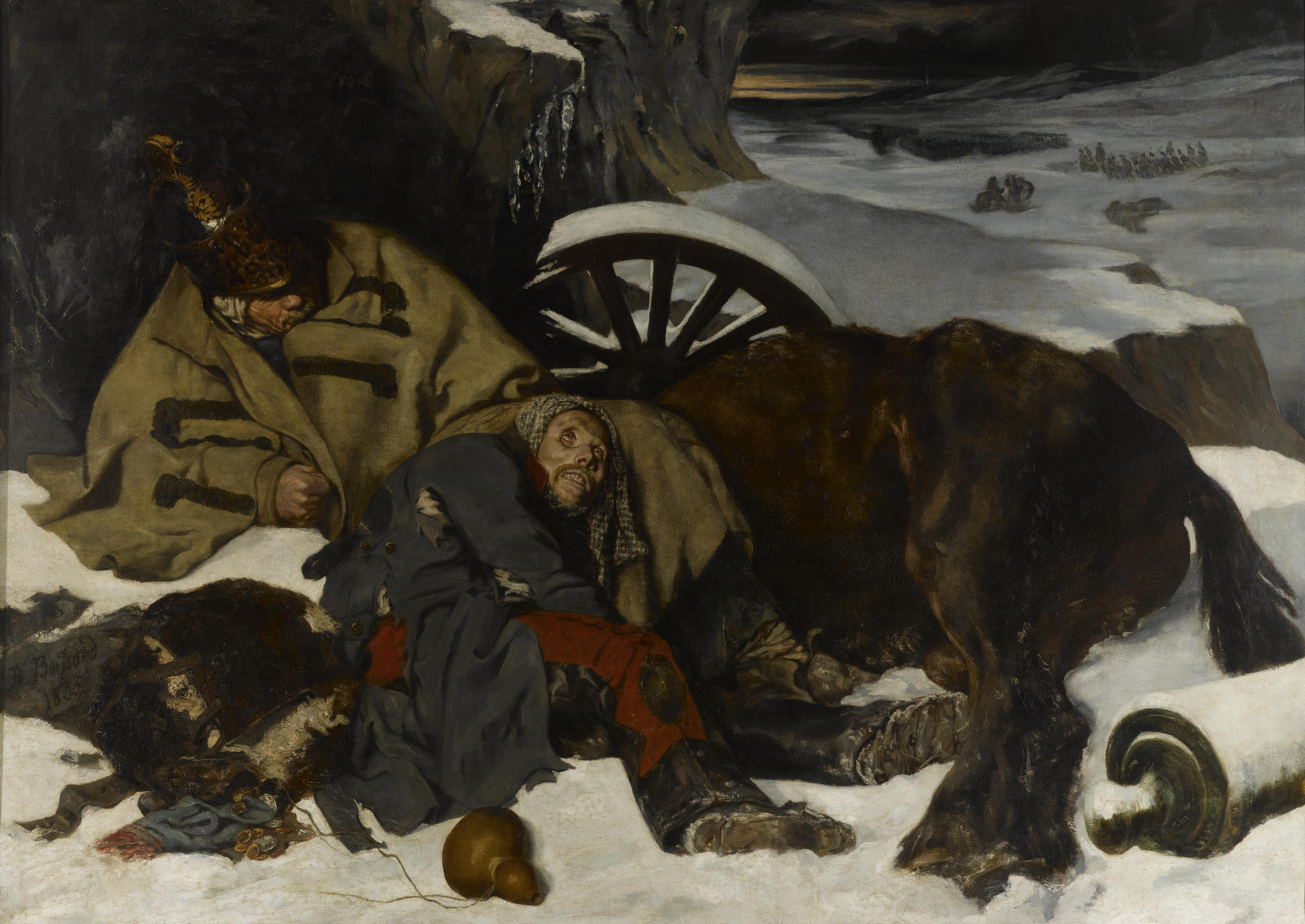
Episode from the Retreat from Russia by Joseph Ferdinand Boissard de Boisdenier

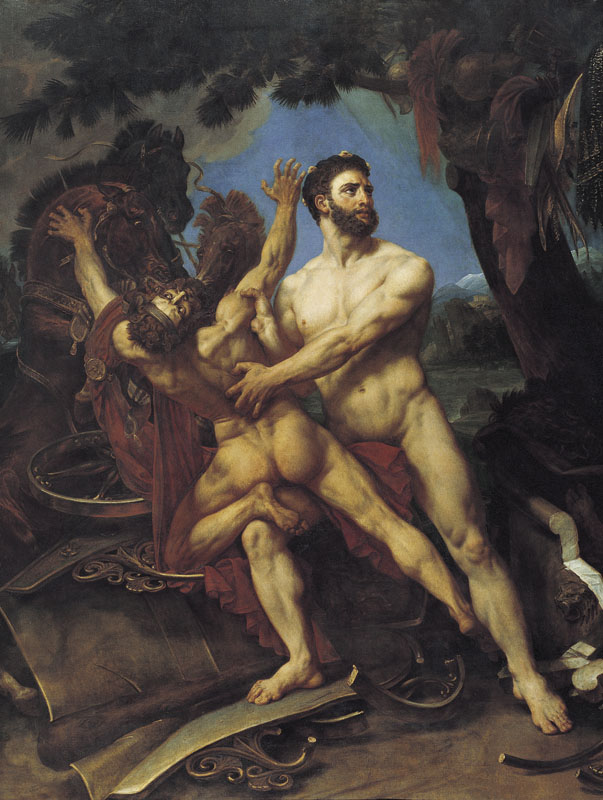
Hercules and Diomedes by Antoine-Jean Gros

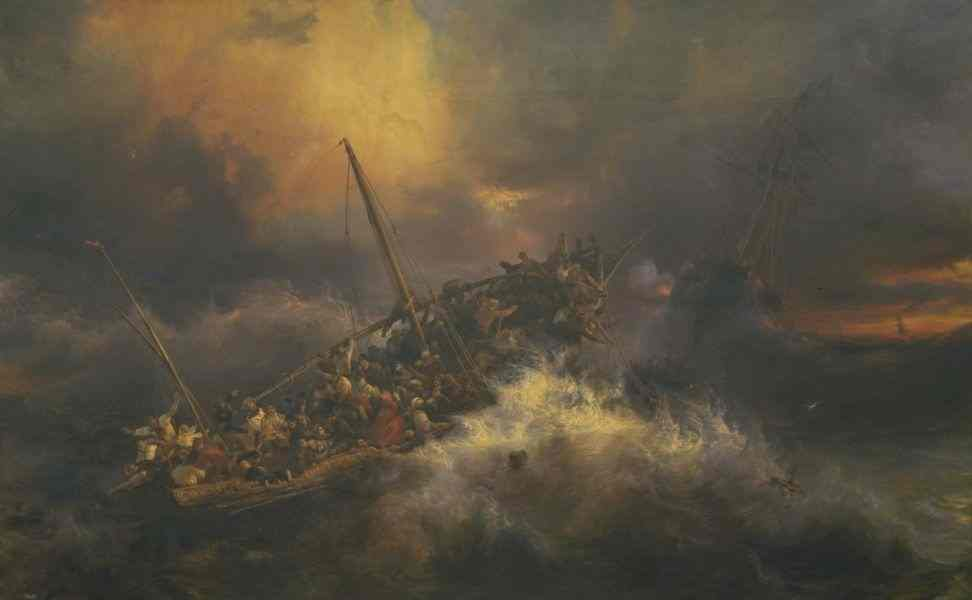
Storm in the Harbour of Algiers by Théodore Gudin

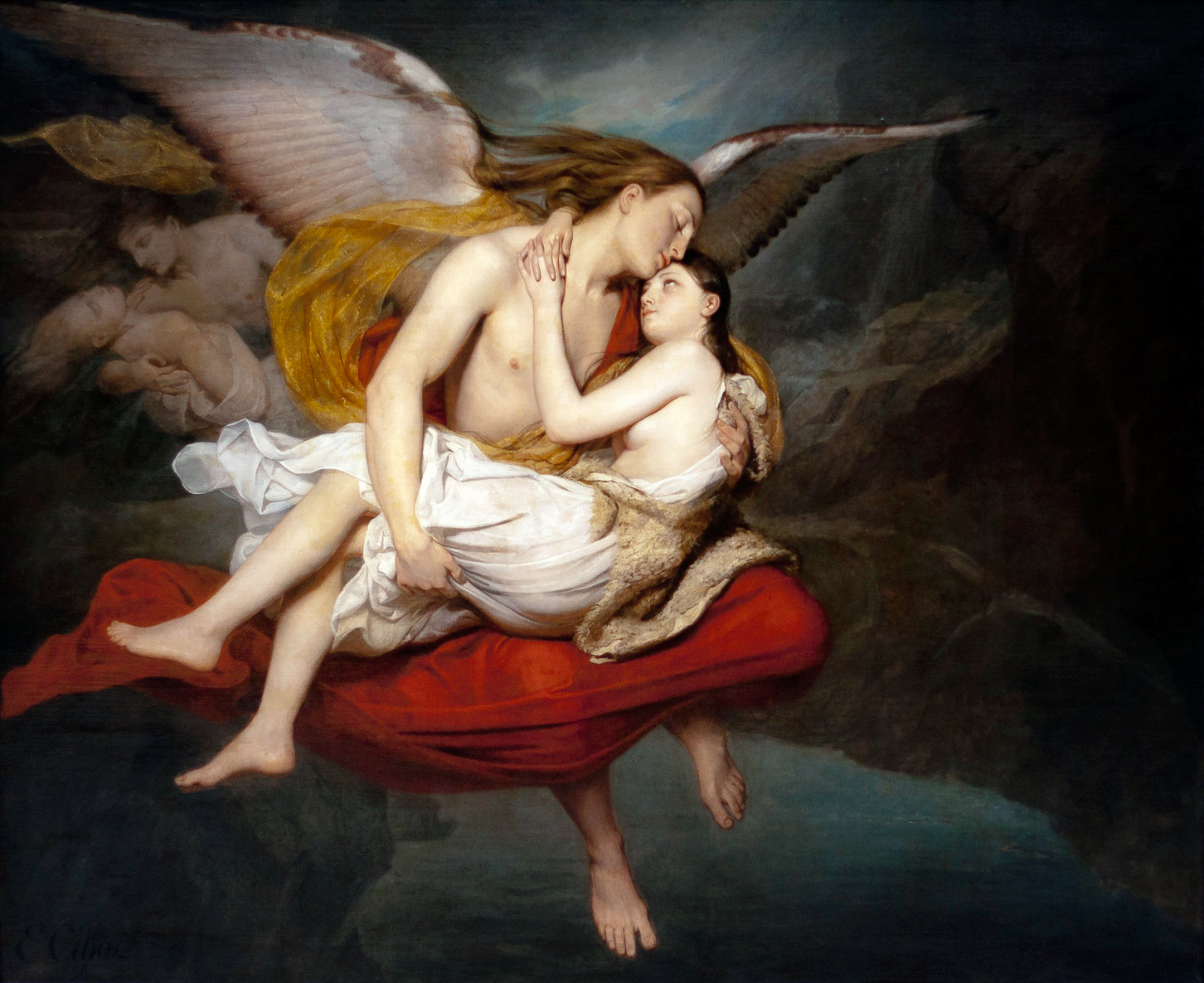
Les amours des anges by Édouard Cibot

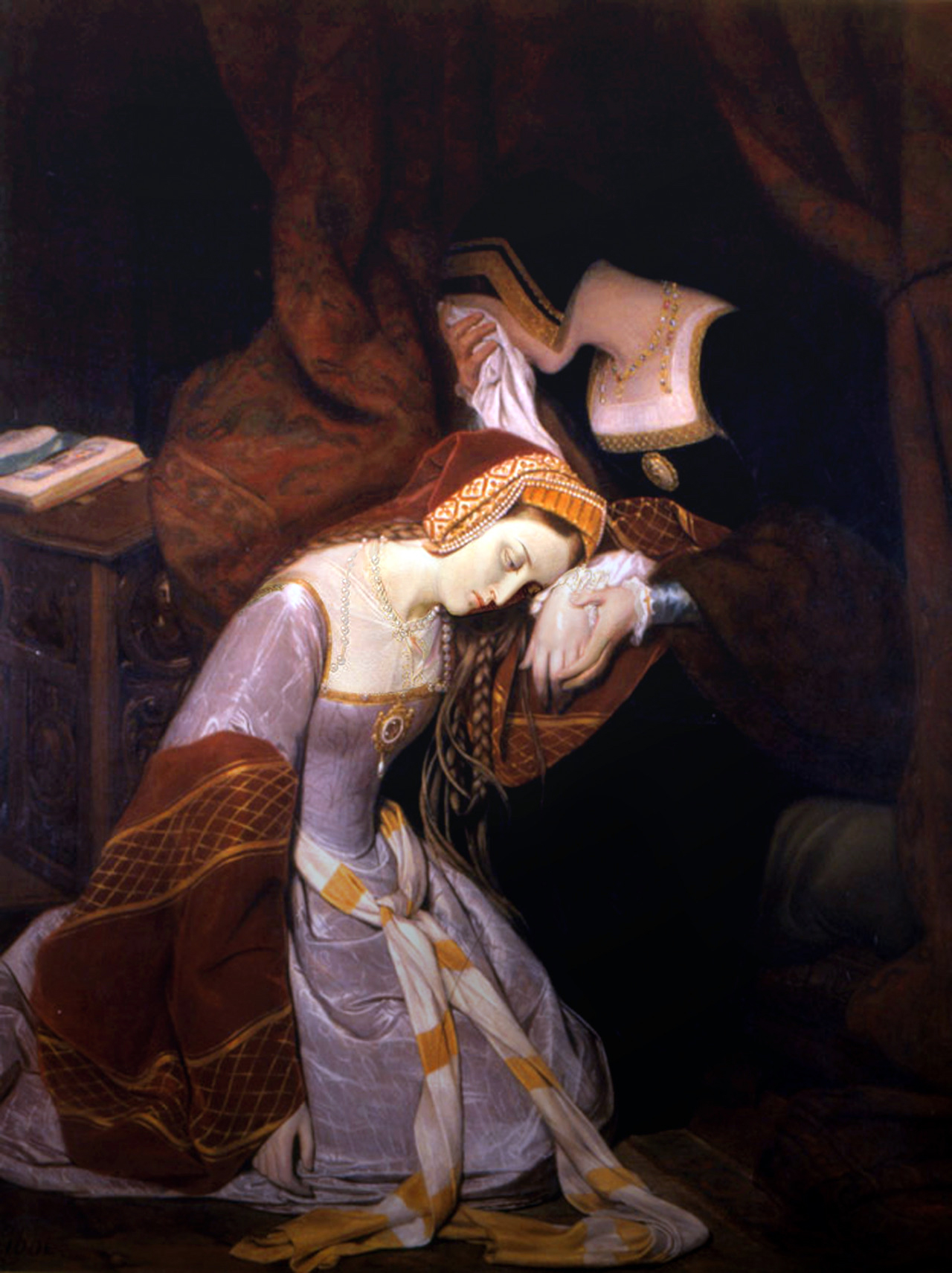
Anne Boleyn in the Tower of London by Édouard Cibot

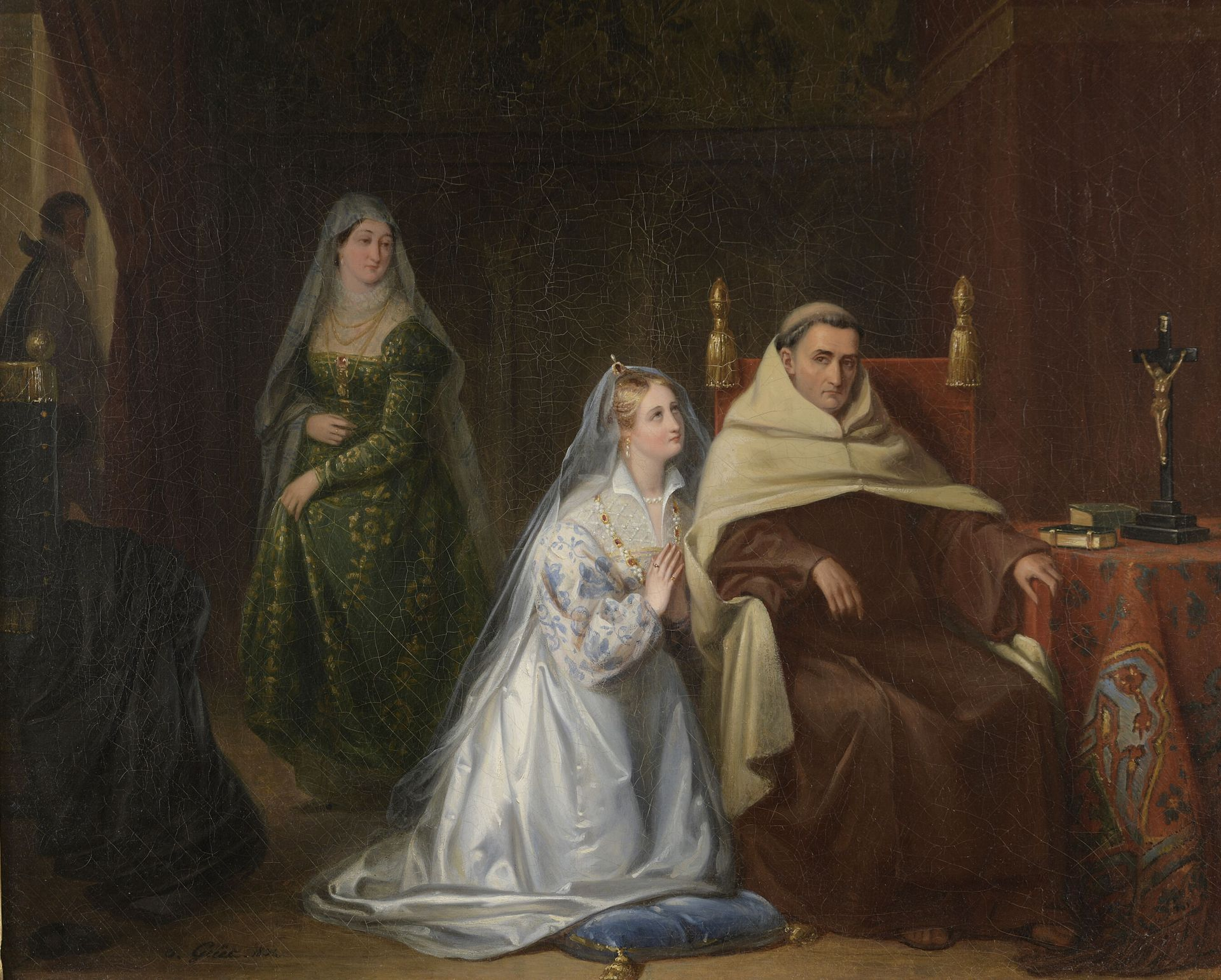
Violetta's Confession by Charlemagne Oscar Guet

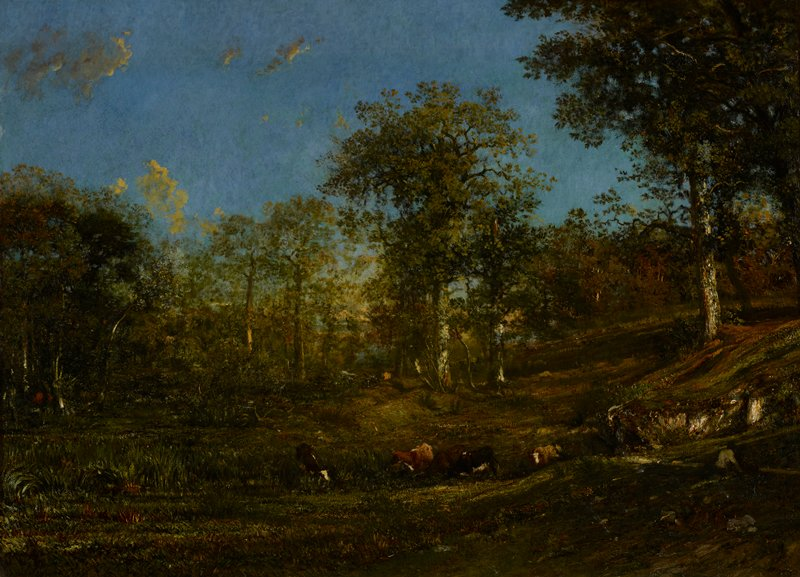
View of the Pastures of the Limousin by Jules Dupré

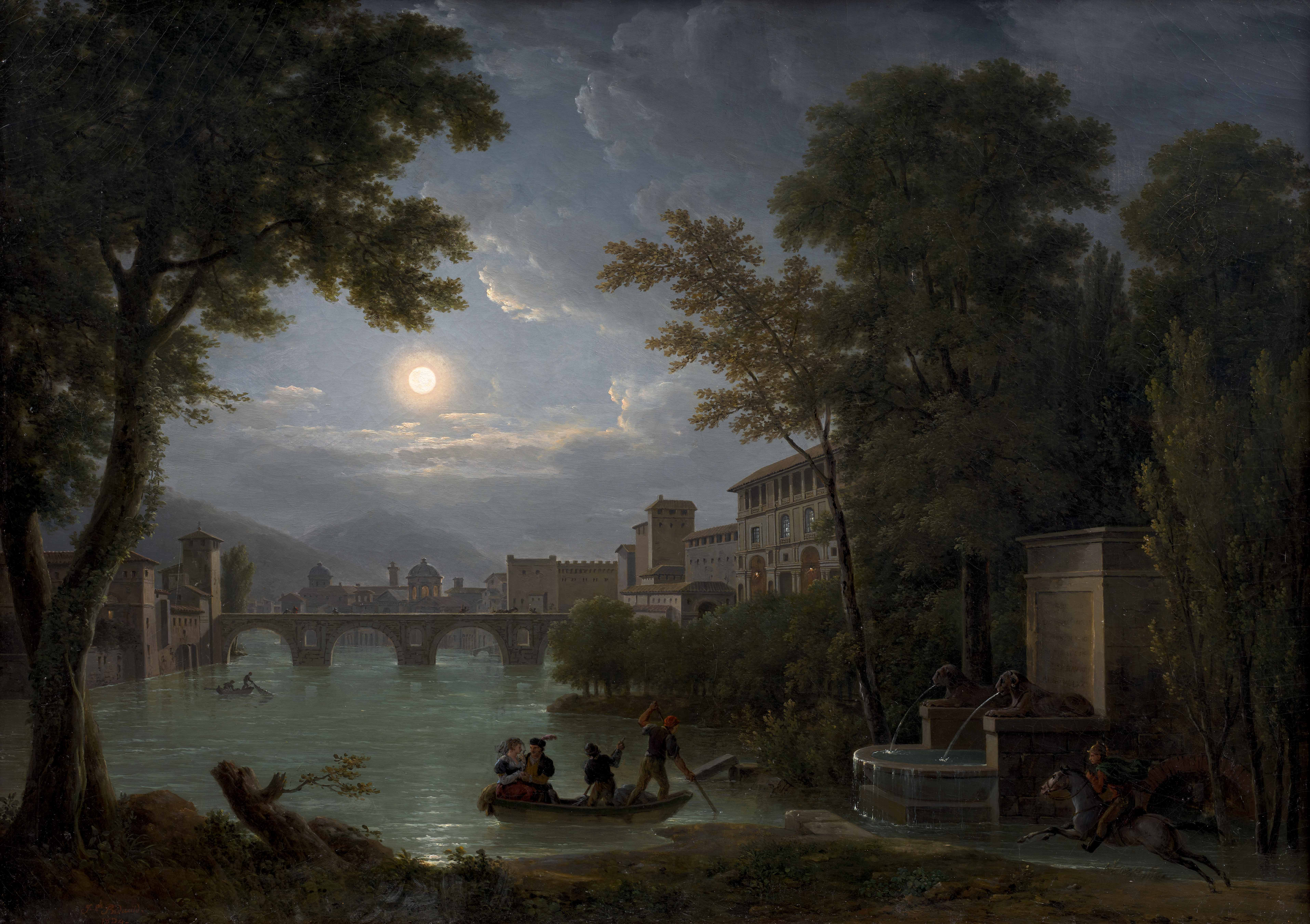
Bianca Capello ; paysage, clair de lune by Jean-Joseph-Xavier Bidauld

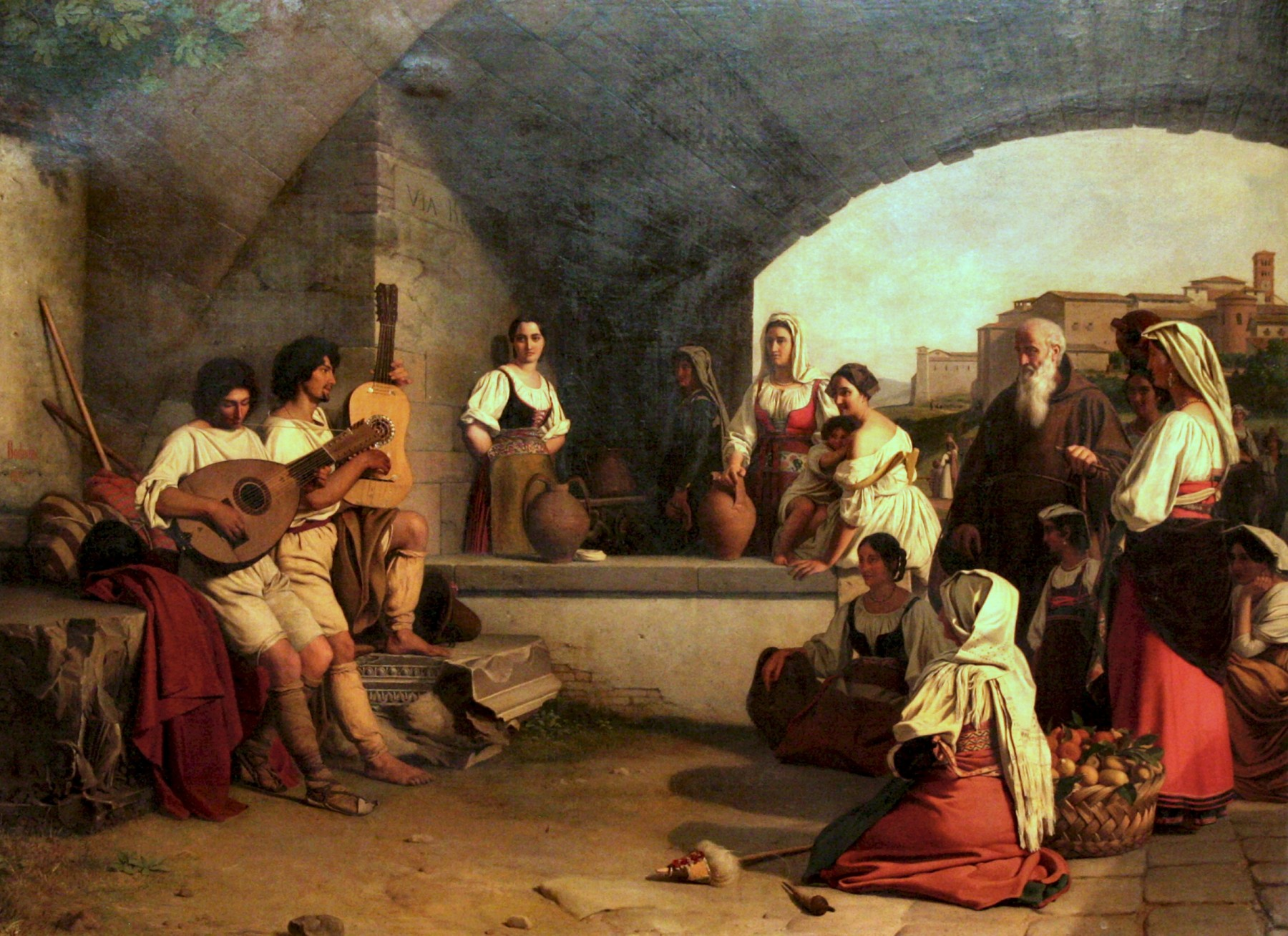
Lute Players by Guillaume Bodinier

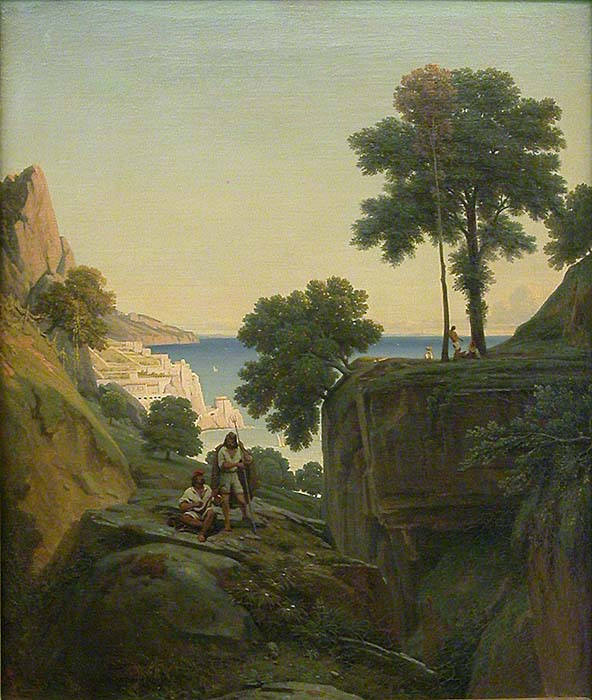
View of Amalfi in the Gulf of Salerno by Théodore Caruelle d'Aligny

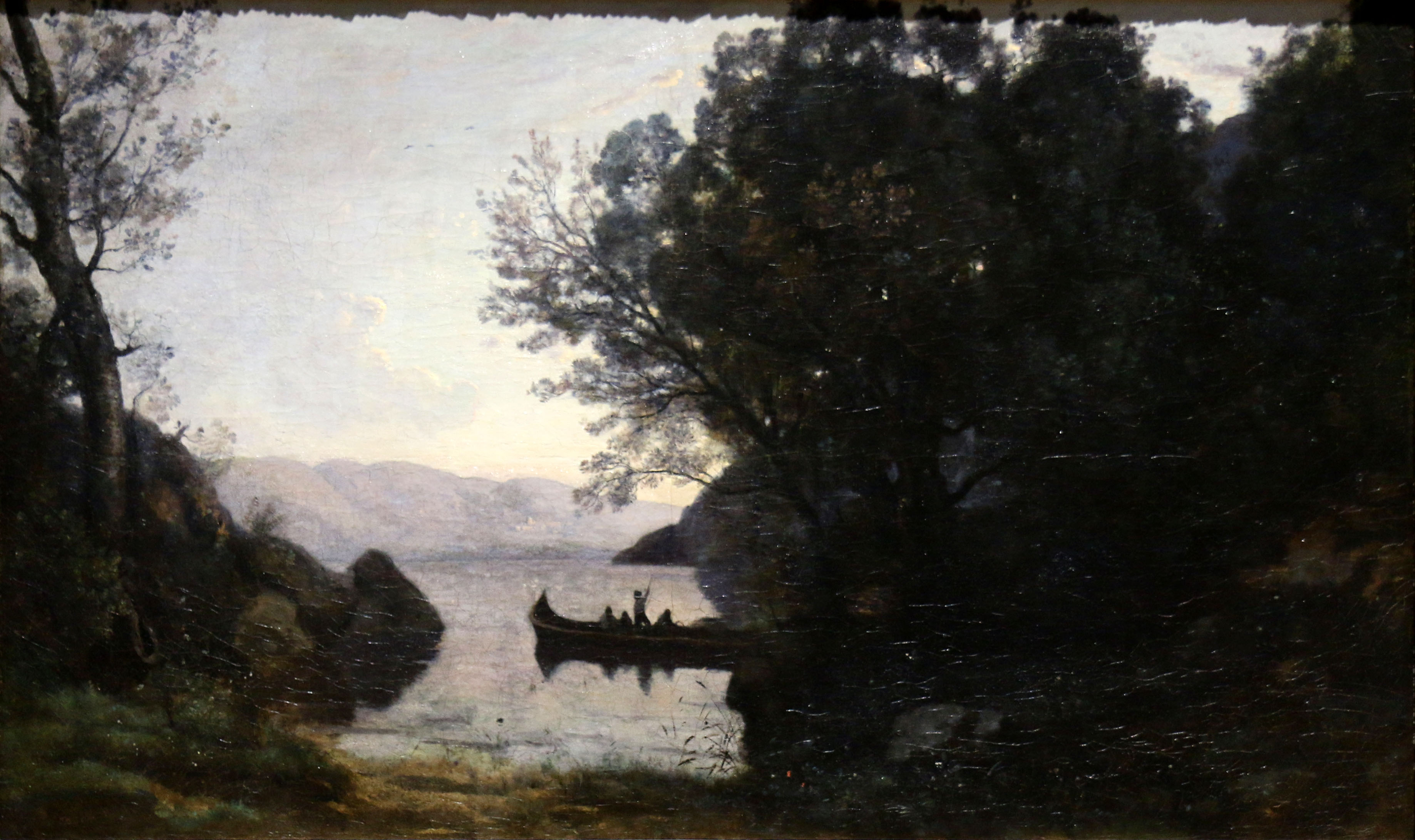
View in Riva by Jean-Baptiste Camille Corot

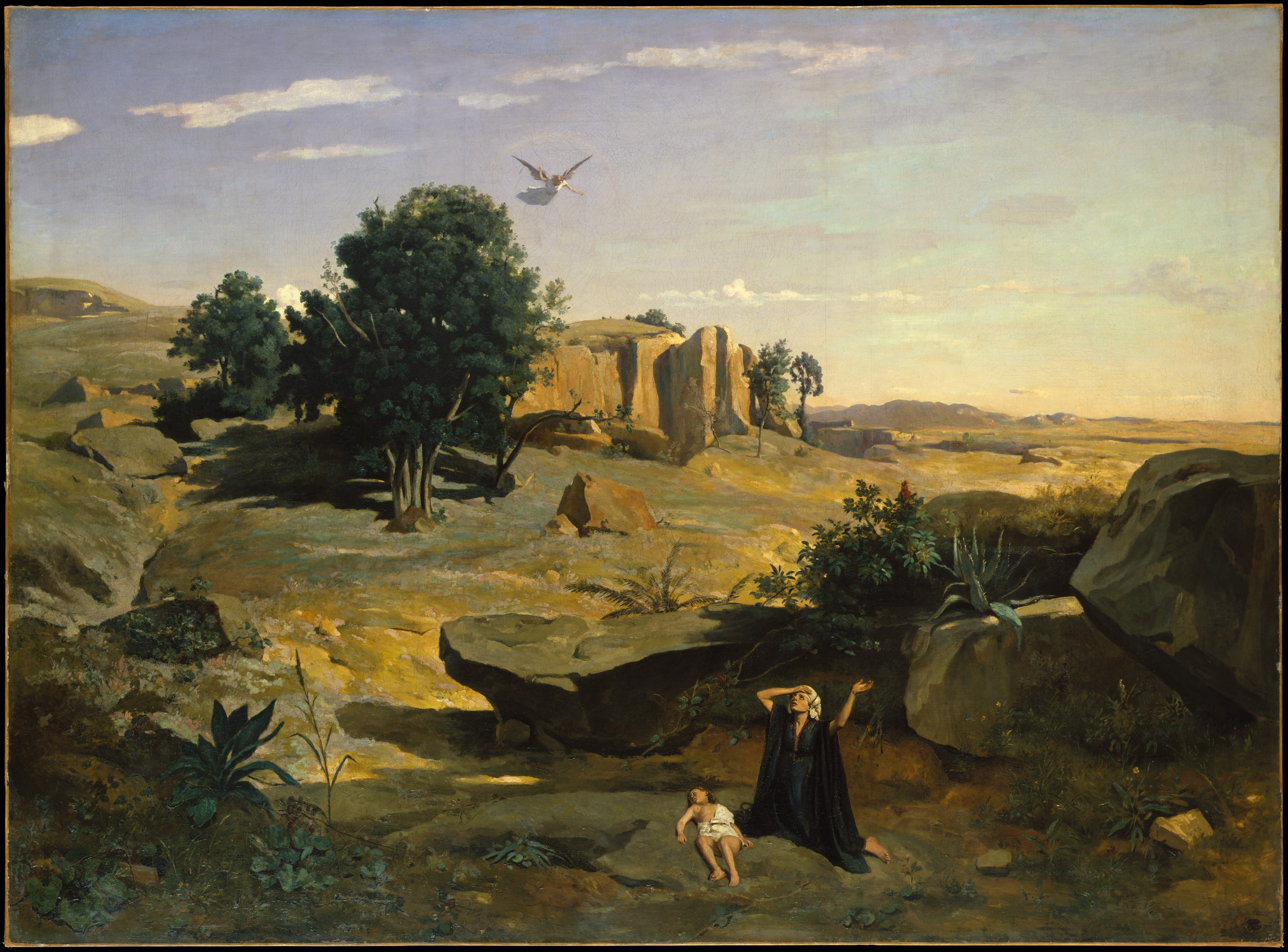
Hagar in the Wilderness by Jean-Baptiste Camille Corot

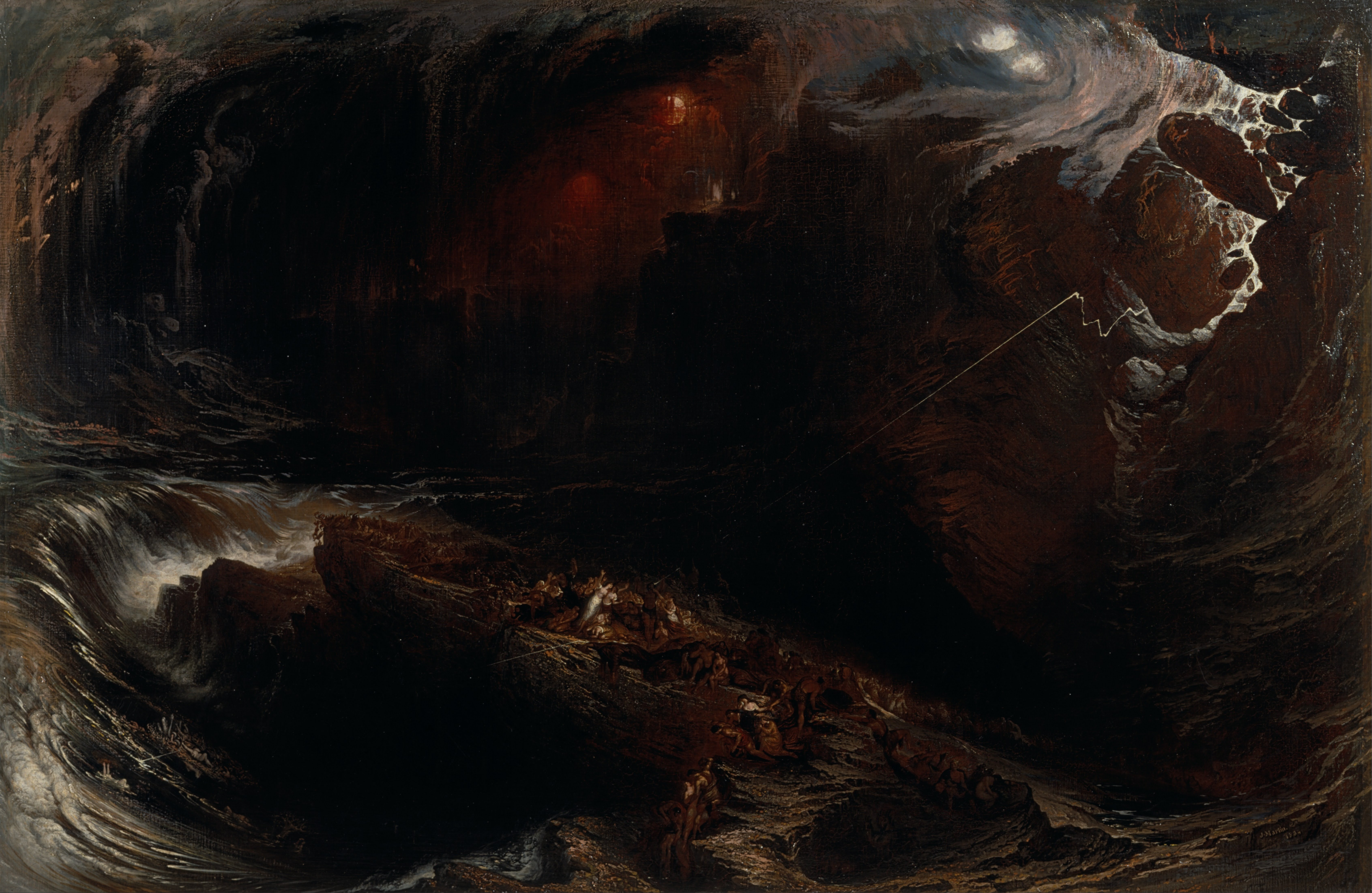
The Deluge by John Martin

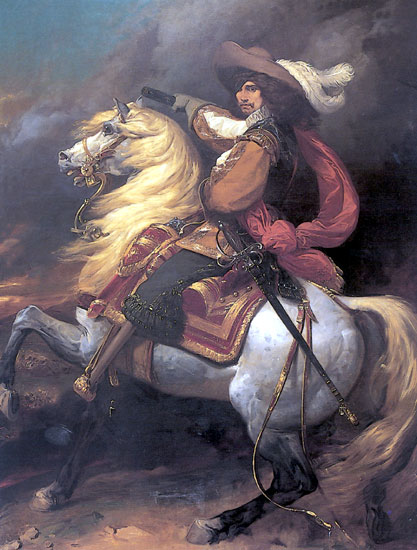
Portrait of Josias von Rantzau by Jean Alaux

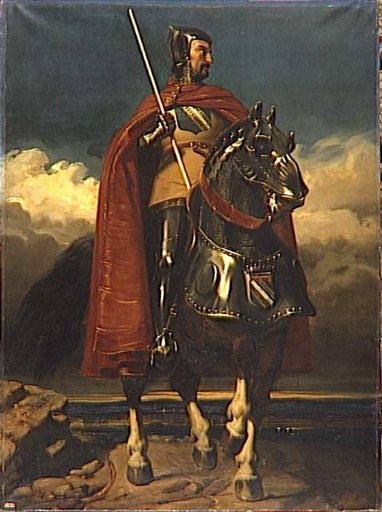
Porrait of Louis de Sancerre by Jules-Claude Ziegler

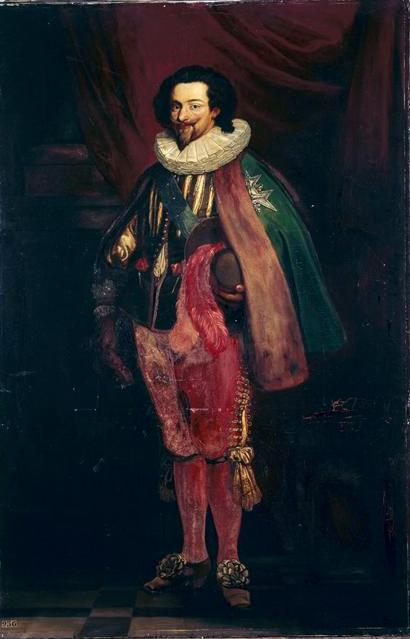
Duke of Luynes as Constable of France by Joseph-Nicolas Robert-Fleury

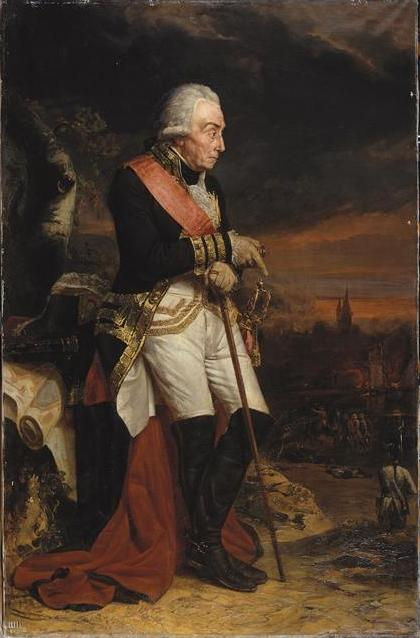
Portrait of Marshal Luckner in 1791 by Auguste Couder

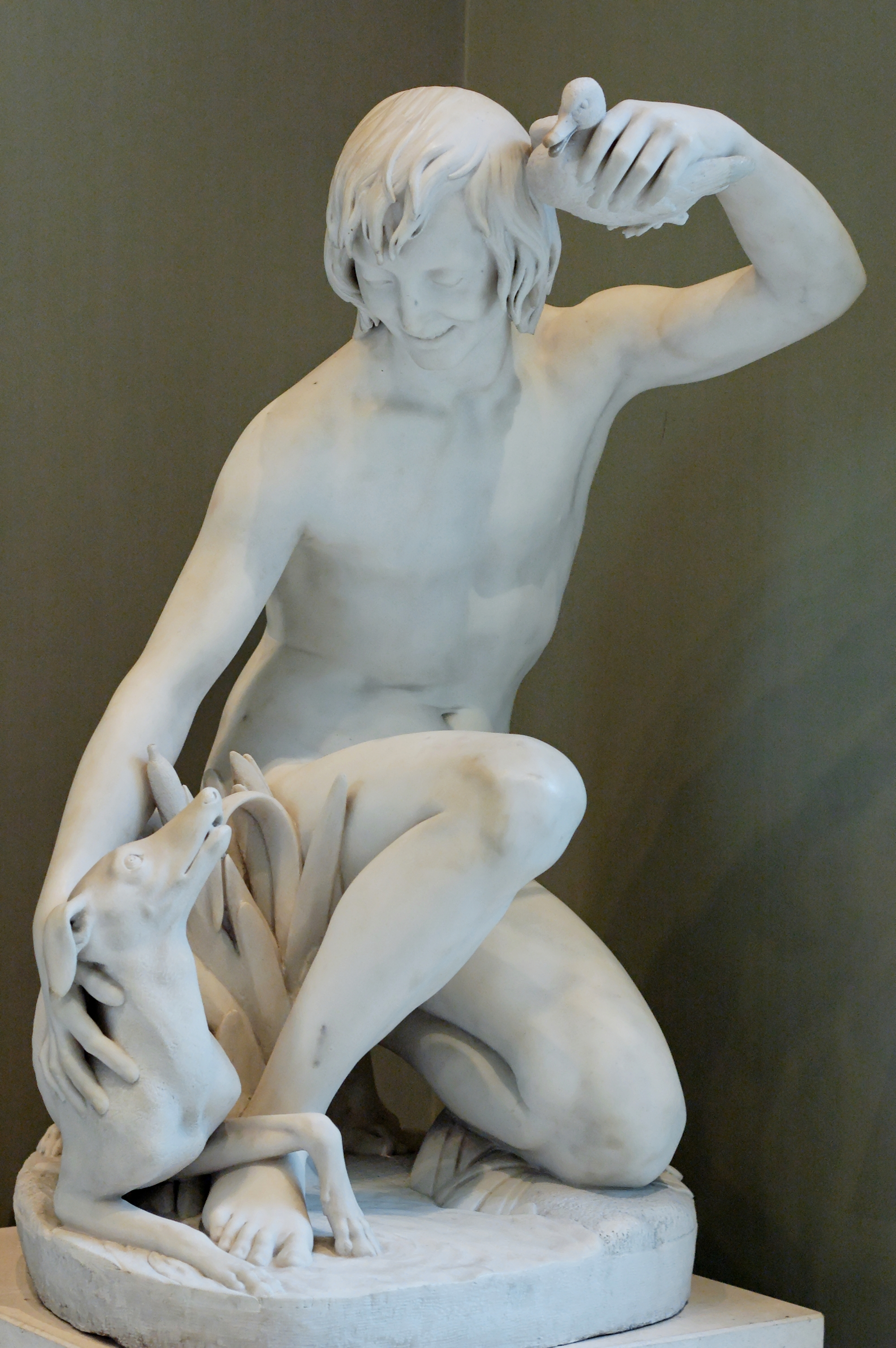
Bather with a Dog by Antoine Laurent Dantan

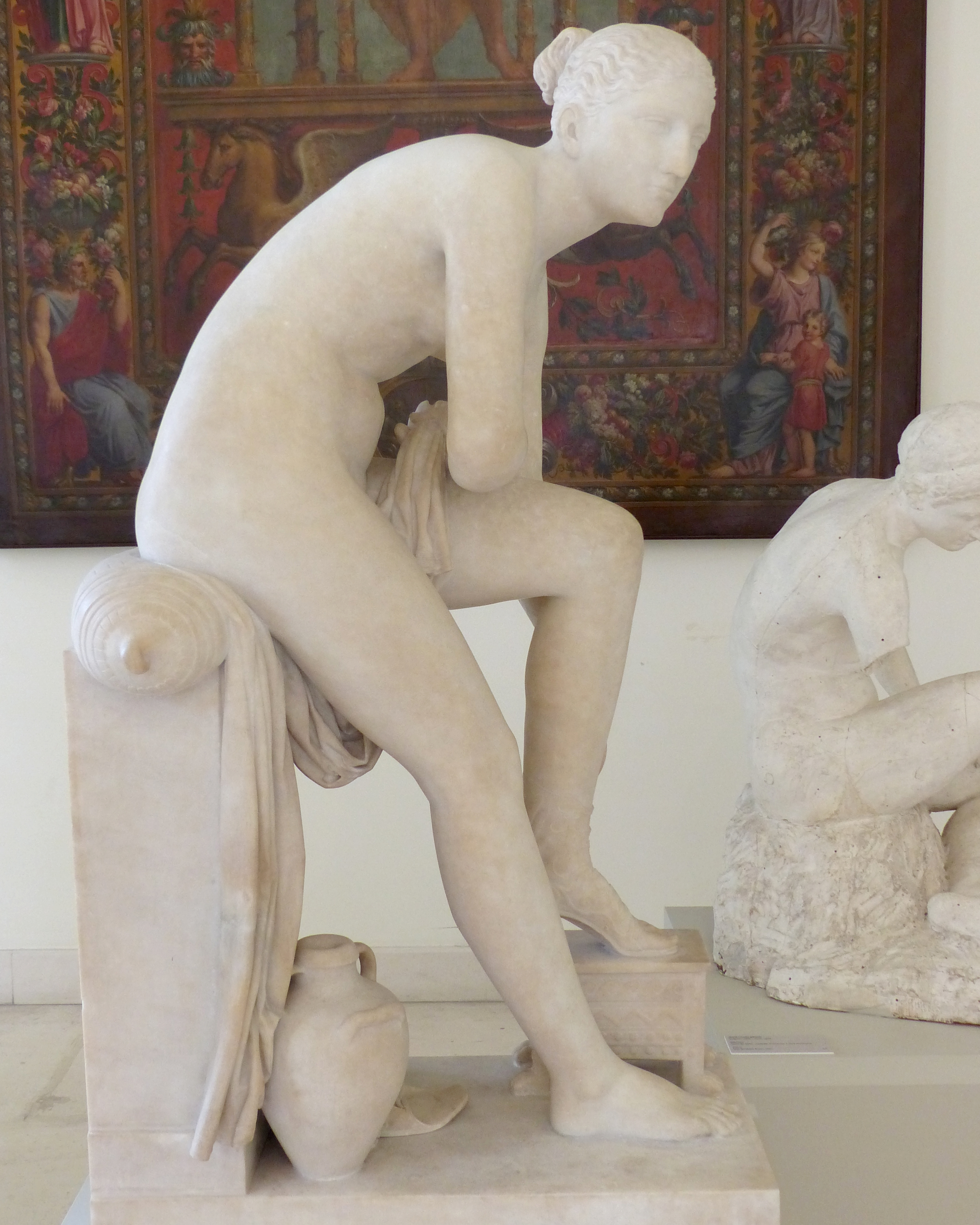
Greek Woman Preparing to Bathe by Jean-Joseph Espercieux

== See also ==
- Royal Academy Exhibition of 1835, held at Somerset House in London

== Bibliography ==
- Brettell, Richard R., Tucker, Paul Hayes & Lee Natalie H. Nineteenth- and Twentieth-century Paintings. Metropolitan Museum of Art, 2009.
- Harkett, Daniel & Hornstein, Katie (ed.) Horace Vernet and the Thresholds of Nineteenth-Century Visual Culture. Dartmouth College Press, 2017.
- Jacobus, Lee A. Humanities: The Evolution of Values. McGraw-Hill, 1986.
- Johnson, Lee. he Paintings of Eugène Delacroix. Clarendon Press, 1986.
- Melot, Michel. The Impressionist Print. Yale University Press, 1996.
- Smyth, Patricia. Paul Delaroche: Painting and Popular Spectacle. Liverpool University Press, 2022.
- Tinterow, Gary. Portraits by Ingres: Image of an Epoch. New York: Metropolitan Museum of Art, 1999
