= The Eve of the Deluge =

Painting by John Martin

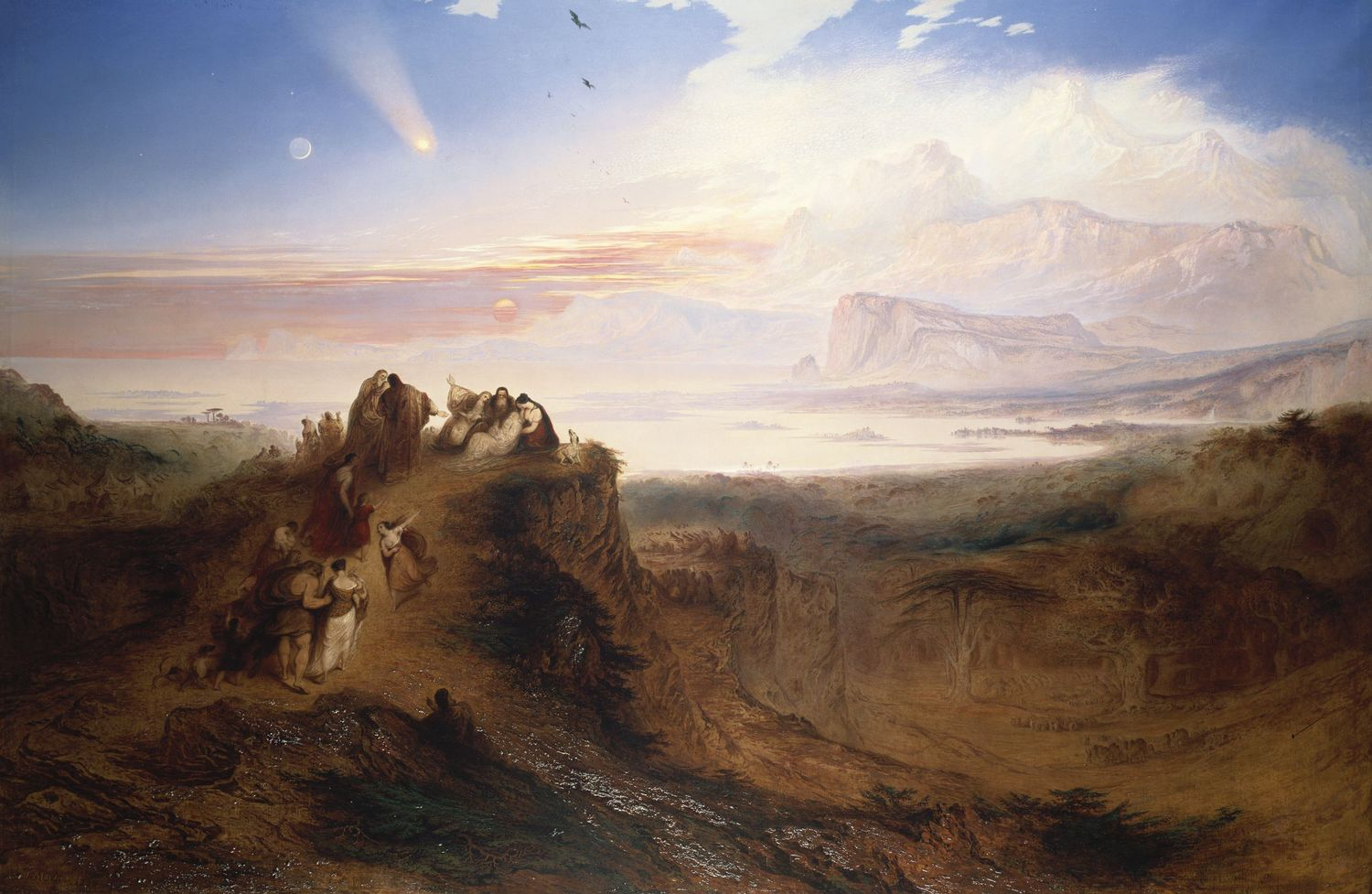
- Artist: John Martin
- Year: 1840
- Type: Oil on canvas, historical landscape painting
- Dimensions: 143 cm × 281.5 cm (56 in × 110.8 in)
- Location: Royal Collection

The Eve of the Deluge is an 1840 oil painting by the British artist John Martin. Combining landscape and history painting, it depicts a biblical scene from the Book of Genesis. The Earth is shown shortly before The Flood and Noah's Ark. On a rocky Promontory the patriarch Methuselah instructs his son Noah to open a scroll prophesying the coming deluge. In the background are careless revellers, unaware of the destruction that is to come.

It was one of a number of epic Old Testament scenes produced in Romantic style by Martin, which were widely reproduced through mezzotints and other engravings. The painting was displayed at the Royal Academy Exhibition of 1840 at the National Gallery in London along with a companion piece The Assuaging of the Waters. Prince Albert had suggested that create a further two paintings to create a trilogy with his earlier picture The Deluge. The work was acquired by Albert for £350 in 1841 and hung in his dressing room at Buckingham Palace. It remains in the Royal Collection today.

== Bibliography ==
- Herrmann, Luke. Nineteenth Century British Painting. Charles de la Mare, 2000.
- Myrone, Martin. John Martin: Apocalypse. Tate Publishing, 2012.
