= The Deluge (Martin) =

Painting by John Martin

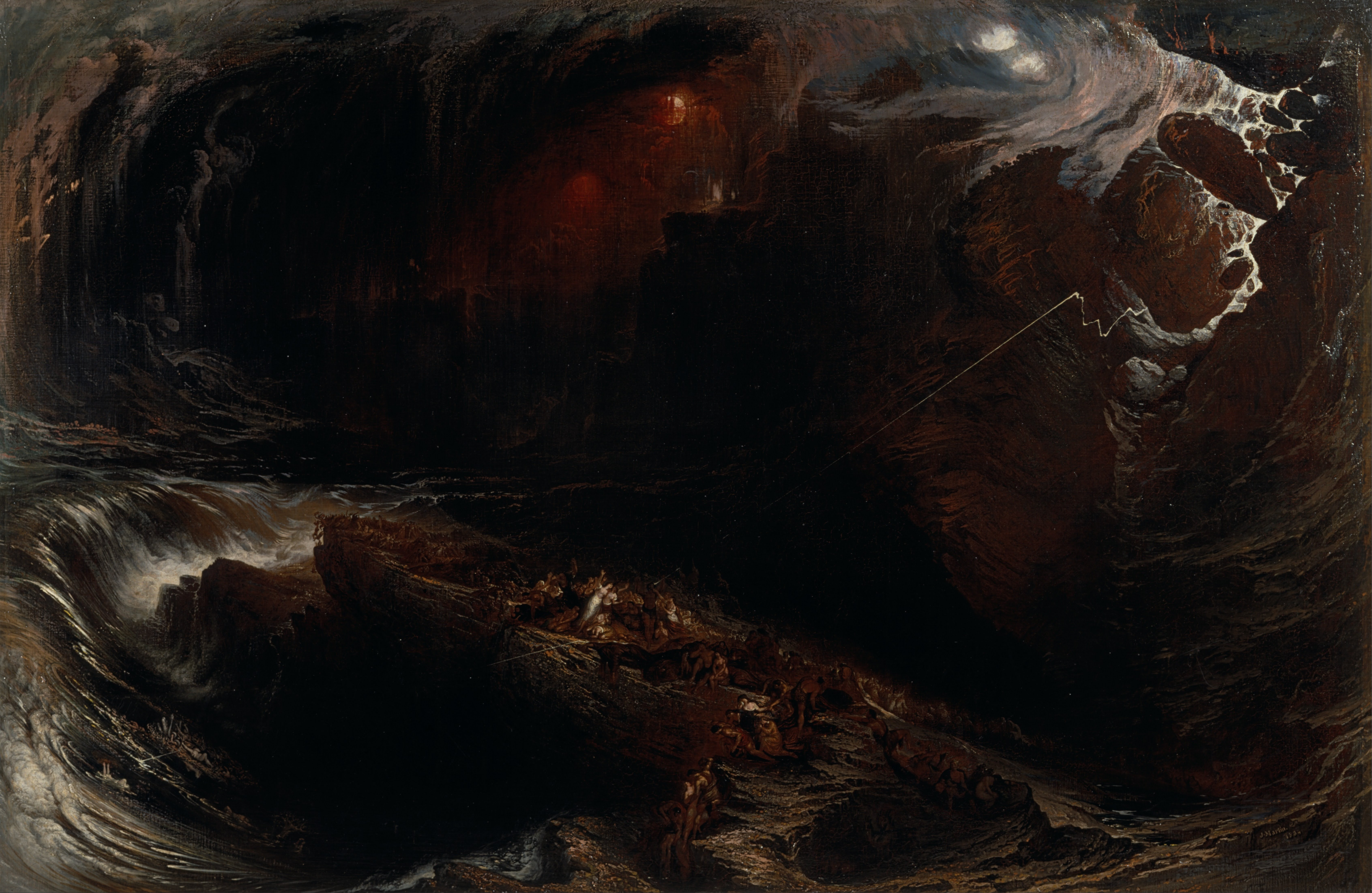
- Artist: John Martin
- Year: 1834
- Type: Oil on canvas, history painting
- Dimensions: 168.3 cm × 258.4 cm (66.3 in × 101.7 in)
- Location: Yale Center for British Art, New Haven

The Deluge is an oil painting on canvas by the British artist John Martin, from 1834. The painting is held in the Yale Center for British Art, in New Haven.

== History and description ==
It depicts the flood from the Old Testament Book of Genesis in a very dark, sinister, stormy setting, with Noah's Ark almost overwhelmed by the elements.

The painting is strongly Romantic in style. Martin had produced an earlier painting of the subject that he displayed at the British Institution's annual exhibition in Pall Mall. However Martin consider this more spectacular version his favourite. He submitted it to the Salon of 1835 at the Louvre, in Paris, where he was awarded a gold medal. Martin was a popular and influential figure in France and his paintings and the mezzotints based on them were well-known.

The work was subsequently displayed at the Royal Academy Exhibition of 1837 at the National Gallery, in London. The painting is now in the Yale Center for British Art, in Connecticut, as part of the Paul Mellon Collection.

== See also ==
- The Eve of the Deluge, an 1840 painting by Martin

== Bibliography ==
- Myrone, Martin. John Martin: Apocalypse. Tate Publishing, 2012.
- Noon, Patrick & Bann, Stephen. Constable to Delacroix: British Art and the French Romantics. Tate, 2003.
