= Darrell Schweitzer bibliography =

Bibliography of dark fantasy, horror, science fiction and nonfiction writer Darrell Schweitzer:

== Fiction ==
=== Sir Julian ===
- "The Hag" (from Swords Against Darkness III, Mar. 1978 - collected in We Are All Legends (1981))
- "The Lady of the Fountain" (from Void no. 5, Feb. 1977 - collected in We Are All Legends (1981))
- "Island of Faces" (1981 - collected in We Are All Legends (1981))
- "The Veiled Pool of Mistorak" (from Fantasy Crosswinds no. 2, Jan. 1977 - collected in We Are All Legends (1981))
- "The One Who Spoke with the Owls" (from Void no. 4, May 1976 - collected in We Are All Legends (1981))
- "The Castle of Kites and Crows" (from Swords Against Darkness V, Nov. 1979 - collected in We Are All Legends (1981))
- "The Riddle of the Horn" (from Heroic Fantasy, Apr. 1979 - collected in We Are All Legends (1981))
- "Divers Hands" (from The Year's Best Horror Stories: Series VII, Jul. 1979 - collected in We Are All Legends (1981))
- "The Unknown God Cried Out" (1981 - collected in We Are All Legends (1981))
- "Into the Dark Land" (from Alien Worlds, 1979 - collected in We Are All Legends (1981))
- "A Fabulous, Formless Darkness" (from Ron Graham Presents Others Worlds, 1978 - collected in We Are All Legends (1981))
- "Midnight, Moonlight, and the Secret of the Sea" (1981 - collected in We Are All Legends (1981))
- "L'envoi" (1981 - collected in We Are All Legends (1981))
- We Are All Legends (1981 short story collection)

=== Tom O'Bedlam ===
- "Tom O'Bedlam's Night Out" (from Fantastic v. 26, no. 3, September 1977 - collected in Tom O'Bedlam's Night Out (1985))
- "Raving Lunacy" (from Amazing Stories v. 55, no. 2, July 1981 - collected in Tom O'Bedlam's Night Out (1985))
- "Continued Lunacy" (from Amazing Science Fiction v. 56, no. 5, March 1983 - collected in Tom O'Bedlam's Night Out (1985))
- "The Last Dangerous Lunacy" (from Amazing Stories v. 63, no. 3, Sep. 1988 - collected in Refugees from an Imaginary Country (1999))
- "Time Enough for Lunacy" (from Weirdbook no. 25, Aut. 1990 - collected in Nightscapes (2000)
- "Tom O'Bedlam and the King of Dreams" (from Weird Tales v. 56, no. 1, Fall 1999 - collected in The Great World and the Small (2001))
- "Tom O'Bedlam and the Mystery of Love" (from The Enchanter Completed: A Tribute Anthology for L. Sprague de Camp, May 2005 - collected in The Emperor of the Ancient Word (2013))

=== Etelven Thios ===
- "The Murder of Etelven Thios" (from Weirdbook no. 14, Jun. 1979 - collected in The Great World and the Small (2001))
- "The Other Murder of Etelven Thios" (from Weirdbook no. 15, 1981 - collected in The Great World and the Small (2001))
- "The Final? Murder? of Etelven Thios?" (from Weirdbook no. 15, 1981 - collected in The Great World and the Small (2001))

=== The Goddess ===
- "The Stones Would Weep" (from Fantasy Tales v. 6, no. 12, Win. 1983 - collected in Echoes of the Goddess
- "The Story of a Dadar" (from Amazing Science Fiction Stories v. 56, no. 1, Jun. 1982 - collected in Tom O'Bedlam's Night Out (1985), Echoes of the Goddess (2013) and The Darrell Schweitzer Megapack (2013))
- "The Diminishing Man" (from Fantasy Book, v. 3, no. 3-4, Sep.-Dec. 1984 - collected in Echoes of the Goddess (2013))
- "A Lantern Maker of Ai Hanlo" (from Amazing Stories v. 58, no. 2, Jul. 1984 - collected in Tom O'Bedlam's Night Out (1985), Echoes of the Goddess (2013) and The Darrell Schweitzer Megapack (2013))
- "Holy Fire" (from Weirdbook 17, 1983 - collected in Echoes of the Goddess (2013))
- "The Stolen Heart" (from Weirdbook 26, Aut. 1991 - collected in Echoes of the Goddess (2013))
- "Immortal Bells" (from Weirdbook 18, 1983 - collected in Echoes of the Goddess (2013))
- "Between Night and Morning" (from Weirdbook 20, Spr. 1985 - collected in Echoes of the Goddess (2013))
- "The Shaper of Animals" (from Amazing Stories v. 62, no. 2, Jul. 1987 - collected in Echoes of the Goddess (2013))
- "Three Brothers" (from Weirdbook 23/24, 1988 - collected in Echoes of the Goddess (2013))
- "Coming of Age in the City of the Goddess" (from Fantasy Book v. 4, no. 2, Jun. 1985 - collected in Echoes of the Goddess (2013))
- The Shattered Goddess (1983 novel)
- Echoes of the Goddess (2013 short story collection)

=== Sherlock Holmes ===
- "The Adventure of the Hanoverian Vampires" (1990 - collected in Deadly Things (2011))
- "The Adventure of the Death-Fetch" (1994 - collected in - collected in The Great World and the Small (2001) and Deadly Things (2011))
- "Sherlock Holmes, Dragon-Slayer" (1996 - collected in Deadly Things (2011))

=== The Great River ===
- "To Become a Sorcerer" (1991 - expanded as The Mask of the Sorcerer (1995))
- The Mask of the Sorcerer (1995 novel)
- "On the Last Night of the Festival of the Dead" (from Interzone no. 90, Dec. 1994 - collected in Refugees from an Imaginary Country (1999), Sekenre (2004) and The Darrell Schweitzer Megapack (2013))
- "The Sorcerer's Gift" (from Worlds of Fantasy & Horror, Win. 1996-7 - collected in Sekenre (2004))
- "King Father Stone" (from Interzone no. 103, Jan. 1996 - collected in Sekenre (2004))
- "The Giant Vorviades" (from Interzone no. 99, Sep. 1995 - collected in Sekenre (2004))
- "The Silence of Kings" (from Weirdbook no. 30, Spr. 1997 - collected in Sekenre (2004))
- "Vandibar Nasha in the College of Shadows" (from Adventures of Sword and Sorcery no. 7, Sep. 2000 - collected in Sekenre (2004) and The Darrell Schweitzer Megapack (2013))
- "In the Street of the Witches" (from Weird Tales v. 56, no. 4, Sum. 2000 - collected in Sekenre (2004))
- "The Lantern of the Supreme Moment" (from Space and Time no. 93, Spr. 2001 - collected in Sekenre (2004))
- "From Out of the Crocodile's Mouth" (from Weird Tales v. 58, no. 1, Fall 2001 - collected in Sekenre (2004))
- "Dreams of the Stone King's Daughter" (from Weird Tales v. 59, no. 2, Win. 2002 - collected in Sekenre (2004))
- "Seeking the Gifts of the Queen of Vengeance" (from Odyssey, iss. 2, 1998 - collected in Sekenre (2004))
- "Lord Abernaeven's Tale" (from Weird Tales v. 60, no. 2, Jan.-Feb. 2004 - collected in Sekenre (2004))
- Sekenre: The Book of the Sorcerer (2004 short story collection)
- "O King of Pain and Splendor!" (from Postscripts no. 20/21, Dec. 2009)
- "The Reprieve" (unpublished)

=== Corpsenburg ===
- "The Most Beautiful Dead Woman in the World" (from Interzone no. 189, May/Jun. 2003 - collected in Living With the Dead (2008) and The Darrell Schweitzer Megapack (2013))
- "They Are Still Dancing" (from Interzone no. 192, Nov./Dec. 2003 - collected in Living With the Dead (2008))
- "The Order of Things Must Be Preserved" (from Interzone no. 193, Spr. 2004 - collected in Living With the Dead (2008))
- "The Boy Who Dreamed of Nothing At All" (2008 - collected in Living With the Dead (2008))
- "The Observatory Committee" (2008 - collected in Living With the Dead (2008))
- Living With the Dead (The Tale of Old Corpsenberg) (2008 short story collection)

=== Pliny the Younger ===
- "Some Unpublished Correspondence of the Younger Pliny" (from The Mammoth Book of Roman Whodunnits, 2003 - collected in Deadly Things (2011))
- "The Stolen Venus" (from Alfred Hitchcock's Mystery Magazine, Oct. 2008 - collected in Deadly Things (2011))

=== Emperor of the Ancient Word ===
- "The Messenger" (from Weird Tales v. 62, no. 5, November/December 2007 - collected in The Emperor of the Ancient Word (2013) and The Darrell Schweitzer Megapack (2013))
- "The Emperor of the Ancient Word" (from Space and Time no. 99, Spring 2005 - collected in The Emperor of the Ancient Word (2013))

=== Other novels ===
- The White Isle (1989)
- The Dragon House (2018)

=== Other short story collections ===
- Tom O'Bedlam's Night Out and Other Strange Excursions (1985)
- The Meaning of Life and Other Awesome Cosmic Revelations (1988)
- Transients and Other Disquieting Stories (1993)
- Refugees from an Imaginary Country (1999)
- Necromancies and Netherworlds: Uncanny Stories (1999) with Jason Van Hollander
- Nightscapes: Tales of the Ominous and Magical (2000)
- The Great World and the Small: More Tales of the Ominous and Magical (2001)
- Deadly Things: A Collection of Mysterious Tales (2011)
- The Emperor of the Ancient Word and Other Fantastic Stories (2013)
- The Darrell Schweitzer Megapack (2013)
- Awaiting Strange Gods: Weird and Lovecraftian Fictions (2015)
- The Mysteries of the Faceless King: The Best Short Fiction of Darrell Schweitzer Volume I (2020)
- The Last Heretic: The Best Short Fiction of Darrell Schweitzer Volume II (2020)
- The Children of Chorazin and Other Strange Denizens (2023)

=== Other short stories ===
- "Memories, Just Memories" (1970)
- "The Silent Screamers" (1971)
- "Come to Mother" (1971)
- "Wrecking Crew" (1972)
- "Legends" (1972)
- "In the Evening of Dreams" (1973 - collected in Nightscapes (2000))
- "Encounter" (1973)
- "The Story of Obbok" (1973 - collected in Tom O'Bedlam's Night Out (1985))
- "The Kingdom of the Air" (1974)
- "A Special Purpose" (1974)
- "How Ranthes Yin Sailed a Boat on the Waters of the River Time" (1975)
- "The White Isle" (1975 - expanded as The White Isle (1989))
- "The Cabin" (1976)
- "The Lady of the Darkwood" (1977)
- "Something Like the Hobo Bird" (1977)
- "The Story of the Brown Man" (1977 - collected in Tom O'Bedlam's Night Out (1985))
- "The Last Horror Out of Arkham" (1977)
- "A Vision of Rembathene" (1977 - collected in Tom O'Bedlam's Night Out (1985))
- "How Four Brought Silence to the City of Storytellers" (1977)
- "The Soul of the Poet" (1977)
- "Wanderers and Travellers We Were" (1978 - collected in The Great World and the Small (2001))
- "The Teddybear" (1978)
- "The Wings of the White Bird" (1978 - collected in Tom O'Bedlam's Night Out (1985))
- "Boy Meets Girl" (1978)
- "Caliban's Revenge" (1978 - collected in Nightscapes (2000))
- "The Giant's Frosted Daughter" (1979)
- "The Secret" (with Henry L. Lazarus) (1979)
- "Never Argue With Antique Dealers" (1980)
- "Relatively Speaking" (with Lee Weinstein) (1980)
- "The Story of the Little Brown Man" (1980)
- "The Headless Horseman" (1980)
- "The Faces of Midnight" (1981)
- "The Doctor's Tale" (1981)
- "The Game of Sand and Fire" (1981 - collected in Tom O'Bedlam's Night Out (1985))
- "A Night in a Haunted Wood" (1981)
- "The Pretenses of Hinyar" (1981 - collected in Tom O'Bedlam's Night Out (1985))
- "The Forest Dream" (1982)
- "Flesh and Shadow" (1983)
- "Sunrise" (1983 - collected in Tom O'Bedlam's Night Out (1985))
- "The Fisherman" (1983)
- "The Phantom Knight" (1983)
- "That Dead Men Rise Up Never" (1984)
- "Jungle Eyes" (1985 - collected in Tom O'Bedlam's Night Out (1985))
- "The Last of the Shadow Titans" (1985 - collected in Tom O'Bedlam's Night Out (1985))
- "The Wrong Stop" (A Story for Children)" (1985)
- "The Last Child of Masferigon" (with John Gregory Betancourt) (1985 - collected in Tom O'Bedlam's Night Out (1985))
- "The Stranger from Baal-Ad-Theon" (1985 - collected in Tom O'Bedlam's Night Out (1985))
- "The Bermuda Triangle Explained" (1985 - collected in Tom O'Bedlam's Night Out (1985))
- "The Adventure in the House of Phaon" (1985 - collected in Tom O'Bedlam's Night Out (1985))
- "Leaving" (1986 - collected in Transients (1993))
- "Jason, Come Home" (1986 - collected in Transients (1993))
- "The Voice of Bel-Hemad" (1986 - collected in Nightscapes (2000))
- "Pennies from Hell" (1987 - collected in Transients (1993))
- "The Children of Lommos" (with John Gregory Betancourt) (1987 - collected in Transients (1993))
- "Transients" (1987 - collected in Transients (1993) and The Darrell Schweitzer Megapack (2013))
- "The Chivalry of Sir Aldingar" (1987)
- "The Mysteries of the Faceless King" (1988 - collected in Refugees from an Imaginary Country (1999) and The Darrell Schweitzer Megapack (2013))
- "We Are the Dead" (1988 - collected in The Great World and the Small (2001))
- "The Young Man Who Did Not Know His Father" (1988)
- "The Meaning of Life" (1988 - collected in The Meaning of Life and Other Awesome Cosmic Revelations (1988))
- "A Public Nuisance" (1988 - collected in The Meaning of Life and Other Awesome Cosmic Revelations (1988))
- "The Man Who Was Galumphed Against His Will" (1988 - collected in The Meaning of Life and Other Awesome Cosmic Revelations (1988))
- "The Man Who Wasn't Nice to Pumpkin Head Dolls" (1988 - collected in Transients (1993))
- "Malevendra's Pool" (1989 - collected in Refugees from an Imaginary Country (1999))
- "Clocks" (1989 - collected in Transients (1993))
- "King Yvorian's Wager" (1989 - collected in Refugees from an Imaginary Country (1999) and The Darrell Schweitzer Megapack (2013))
- "Seeing Them" (1989 - collected in Transients (1993))
- "The Man Who Found the Heart of the Forest" (1989 - collected in Transients (1993))
- "Going to the Mountain" (1990 - collected in Refugees from an Imaginary Country (1999))
- "The Unmaker of Men" (with Jason Van Hollander) (1990 - collected in Necromancies and Netherworlds (1999))
- "Soft" (1990 - collected in Transients (1993))
- "Peeling It Off" (1990 - collected in Transients (1993) and The Darrell Schweitzer Megapack (2013))
- "The Strange Rider from the Far, Dark Land" (1990 - collected in Refugees from an Imaginary Country (1999))
- "The Throwing Suit" (with Jason Van Hollander) (1990 - collected in Transients (1993) and Necromancies and Netherworlds (1999))
- "Angry Man" (1990 - collected in Refugees from an Imaginary Country (1999))
- "The Paloverde Lodge" (with Jason Van Hollander) (1990 - collected in Transients (1993) and Necromancies and Netherworlds (1999))
- "Men Without Maps" (with Jason Van Hollander) (1991 - collected in Necromancies and Netherworlds (1999))
- "The Cloth Gods of Zhamiir" (with Jason Van Hollander) (1991 - collected in Necromancies and Netherworlds (1999))
- "Minotauress" (1991 - collected in Refugees from an Imaginary Country (1999))
- "Short and Nasty" (1991 - collected in Transients (1993))
- "Savages" (1991 - collected in Refugees from an Imaginary Country (1999) and The Darrell Schweitzer Megapack (2013))
- "The Spirit of the Back Stairs" (1991 - collected in Transients (1993) and The Darrell Schweitzer Megapack (2013))
- "The Caravan of the Dead" (with Jason Van Hollander) (1992 - collected in Necromancies and Netherworlds (1999))
- "Told by Moonlight" (1992 - collected in Nightscapes (2000))
- "The Outside Man" (1992 - collected in Refugees from an Imaginary Country (1999) and The Darrell Schweitzer Megapack (2013))
- "The Great World and the Small" (1993 - collected in The Great World and the Small (2001))
- "The Liar's Mouth" (1993 - collected in Nightscapes (2000))
- "An Interview with Edgar Allan Poe" (1993 - collected in Windows of the Imagination: Essays on Fantastic Literature (1998))
- "Three Brothers of the Air" (1993)
- "The Cup of Pain" (1993)
- "The Sorcerer Evoragdou" (1993 - collected in Refugees from an Imaginary Country (1999) and The Darrell Schweitzer Megapack (2013))
- "The Man in the White Mask" (with Jason Van Hollander) (1994 - collected in Necromancies and Netherworlds (1999))
- "On the Holy Mountain" (1994 - collected in Nightscapes (2000))
- "Those of the Air" (with Jason Van Hollander) (1994 - collected in Necromancies and Netherworlds (1999) and Awaiting Strange Gods (2015))
- "One of the Secret Masters" (1994 - collected in Refugees from an Imaginary Country (1999) and The Darrell Schweitzer Megapack (2013))
- "The Epilogue of the Sword" (1995 - collected in Nightscapes (2000))
- "The Witch of the World's End" (1995 - collected in Nightscapes (2000) and The Darrell Schweitzer Megapack (2013))
- "The Knight of Pale Countenance" (1995 - collected in Refugees from an Imaginary Country (1999))
- "Runaway" (1995 - collected in Refugees from an Imaginary Country (1999))
- "Climbing" (1995 - collected in Refugees from an Imaginary Country (1999))
- "The Magical Dilemma of Mondesir" (with Jason Van Hollander) (1995 - collected in Necromancies and Netherworlds (1999))
- "Silkie Son" (1995 - collected in The Great World and the Small (2001))
- "Believing in the Twentieth Century" (1996 - collected in The Great World and the Small (2001))
- "The Unwanted Grail" (1996 - collected in The Great World and the Small (2001))
- "Last Things" (1996 - collected in Refugees from an Imaginary Country (1999) and Deadly Things (2011))
- "The Silence in Kandretiphon" (1996 - collected in Nightscapes (2000))
- "Adam" (1996 - collected in Nightscapes (2000))
- "Smart Guy" (1996 - collected in Nightscapes (2000))
- "The Crystal-Man" (with Jason Van Hollander) (1996 - collected in Necromancies and Netherworlds (1999))
- "The Dragon of Camlann" (1997 - collected in The Great World and the Small (2001))
- "Kvetchula" (1997 - collected in Nightscapes (2000) and The Darrell Schweitzer Megapack (2013))
- "I Told You So" (1997 - collected in The Great World and the Small (2001))
- "Sir Artegall in The Dragon of Camlann" (1997)
- "The Death of Falstaff" (1997 - collected in Refugees from an Imaginary Country (1999) and Deadly Things (2011))
- "Refugees from an Imaginary Country" (1997 - collected in Refugees from an Imaginary Country (1999) and The Darrell Schweitzer Megapack (2013))
- "Running to Camelot" (1998 - collected in Nightscapes (2000) and The Darrell Schweitzer Megapack (2013))
- "Murdered by Love" (1998 - collected in Deadly Things (2011))
- "Return from Exile" (1998 - collected in Nightscapes (2000))
- "A Servant of Satan" (1998 - collected in Nightscapes (2000))
- "Just Suppose" (1998 - collected in The Great World and the Small (2001))
- "Ye Olde Englishe Ghost Story" (1999)
- "Ghost" (1999 - collected in The Great World and the Small (2001))
- "Bitter Chivalry" (1999 - collected in Nightscapes (2000))
- "Saxon Midnight" (2000 - collected in The Emperor of the Ancient Word (2013))
- "The Invisible Knight's Squire" (2000 - collected in The Great World and the Small (2001))
- "The Fire Eggs" (2000 - collected in The Emperor of the Ancient Word (2013))
- "Appeasing the Darkness" (2000 - collected in The Children of Chorazin (2023))
- "The Last of the Black Wine" (2001)
- "They Never Found His Head" (2001)
- "Our Father Down Below" (2001 - collected in The Emperor of the Ancient Word (2013))
- "The Last of the Giants of Albion" (2002 - collected in The Emperor of the Ancient Word (2013))
- "Whom Even Death Might Fear" (2002)
- "Secret Murders" (2002 - collected in The Emperor of the Ancient Word (2013))
- "The Girl Who Fell from the Moon: A Legend of Atlantis" (2002)
- "A Dark Miracle" (2002 - collected in The Children of Chorazin (2023))
- "Why We Do It" (2002 - collected in Awaiting Strange Gods (2015))
- "Envy, the Gardens of Ynath, and the Sin of Cain" (2002 - collected in Awaiting Strange Gods (2015))
- "How It Ended" (2002 - collected in The Emperor of the Ancient Word (2013) and The Darrell Schweitzer Megapack (2013))
- "The Dead Kid" (2002 - collected in The Emperor of the Ancient Word (2013))
- "The Third Way" (2002)
- "The Runners in the Maze" (2003)
- "The Scroll of the Worm" (with Jason Van Hollander) (2004 - collected in Awaiting Strange Gods (2015))
- "The Rider of the Dark" (2004)
- "At the Top of the Black Stairs" (2005 - collected in The Emperor of the Ancient Word (2013))
- "Fighting the Zeppelin Gang" (2006 - collected in The Emperor of the Ancient Word (2013) and The Darrell Schweitzer Megapack (2013))
- "The Hero Spoke" (2006 - collected in The Emperor of the Ancient Word (2013))
- "Sometimes You Have to Shout About It" (2007 - collected in Awaiting Strange Gods (2015))
- "A Lost City of the Jungle" (2007 - collected in The Emperor of the Ancient Word (2013))
- "Honored Be Her Name" (with John Gregory Betancourt) (2007)
- "In a Byzantine Garden" (2007 - collected in Deadly Things (2011))
- "Sweep Me to My Revenge!" (2007 - collected in The Emperor of the Ancient Word (2013))
- "The Idol in His Hand" (2007)
- "Thousand Year Warrior" (2008 - collected in The Emperor of the Ancient Word (2013))
- "The Eater of Hours" (2009 - collected in The Darrell Schweitzer Megapack (2013) and Awaiting Strange Gods (2015))
- "In the Dreaming House" (2010)
- "Kvetchula's Daughter" (2010 - collected in The Darrell Schweitzer Megapack (2013))
- "Ghost Dancing" (2010 - collected in Awaiting Strange Gods (2015))
- "Howling in the Dark" (2010 - collected in The Darrell Schweitzer Megapack (2013) and Awaiting Strange Gods (2015))
- "The Werewolf of Camelot" (2010)
- "Pages from an Invisible Book" (2010)
- "We Are the Monsters Now" (2011 - collected in The Emperor of the Ancient Word (2013))
- "Into the Gathering Dark" (2011)
- "The Last Heretic" (2011 - collected in The Darrell Schweitzer Megapack (2013))
- "Class Reunion" (2011 - collected in Awaiting Strange Gods (2015))
- "Innsmouth Idyll" (2011 - collected in Awaiting Strange Gods (2015))
- "The Runners Beyond the Wall" (2012 - collected in Awaiting Strange Gods (2015))
- "True Blue" (2012)
- "The Clockwork King, the Queen of Glass, and the Man with the Hundred Knives" (2012 - collected in Awaiting Strange Gods (2015))
- "Jimmy Bunny" (2012 - collected in Awaiting Strange Gods (2015))
- "Dreaming Kandresphar" (2013)
- "No Signal" (2013 - collected in The Children of Chorazin (2023))
- "In Old Commoriom" (2013 - collected in Awaiting Strange Gods (2015))
- "Going to Ground" (2014 - collected in The Children of Chorazin (2023))
- "Odd Man Out" (2014 - collected in The Children of Chorazin (2023))
- "Stragglers from Carrhae" (2014 - collected in Awaiting Strange Gods (2015))
- "The Warm" (2014 - collected in Awaiting Strange Gods (2015))
- "Hanged Man and Ghost" (2014 - collected in Awaiting Strange Gods (2015))
- "An American Story" (2014)
- "On the Eastbound Train" (2014 - collected in Awaiting Strange Gods (2015))
- "Come, Follow Me" (2015 - collected in The Children of Chorazin (2023))
- "A Prism of Darkness" (2015 - collected in The Children of Chorazin (2023))
- "Spiderwebs in the Dark" (2015 - collected in Awaiting Strange Gods (2015))
- "The House of the Witches" (2015)
- "Boxes of Dead Children" (2015 - collected in The Children of Chorazin (2023))
- "The Head Shop in Arkham" (? - collected in Awaiting Strange Gods (2015))
- "The Corpse Detective" (? - collected in Awaiting Strange Gods (2015))
- "The Last of the Black Wind" (? - collected in Awaiting Strange Gods (2015))
- "Old One's Fall" (2015)
- "Were--?" (2015 - collected in The Children of Chorazin (2023))
- "Madness on the Black Planet" (2016 - collected in The Children of Chorazin (2023))
- "The Red Witch of Chorazin" (2016 - collected in The Children of Chorazin (2023))
- "The Dragons of the Night" (2016)
- "The Hutchison Boy" (2016 - collected in The Children of Chorazin (2023))
- "The Tale and the Teller" (2017)
- "Not in the Card Catalog" (2017 - collected in The Children of Chorazin (2023))
- "A Predicament" (2017 - collected in The Children of Chorazin (2023))
- "The Tale and the Teller" (2017)
- "The Girl in the Attic" (2017 - collected in The Children of Chorazin (2023))
- "The Philosopher Thief" (2018)
- "Uncle's in the Treetops" (2018 - collected in The Children of Chorazin (2023))
- "The Interrogator" (2019 - collected in The Children of Chorazin (2023))
- "The Song of Black Mountain" (2019)
- "Down to a Sunless Sea" (2019 - collected in The Children of Chorazin (2023))
- "The Martian Bell" (2019 - collected in The Children of Chorazin (2023))
- "The Return of the Night-Gaunts" (2020 - collected in The Children of Chorazin (2023))
- "The Thief of Dreams" (2020 - collected in The Children of Chorazin (2023))
- "All Kings and Princes Bow Down Unto Me" (2021 - collected in The Children of Chorazin (2023))
- "The Festival of the Pallid Mask" (2021 - collected in The Children of Chorazin (2023))
- "The Reprieve" (2021)
- "Killing the Pale Man" (2022 - collected in The Children of Chorazin (2023))
- "Can We Keep Him?" (2023)
- "The Bear Went Over the Mountain" (collected in The Children of Chorazin (2023))
- "The White Face" (collected in The Children of Chorazin (2023))
- "When Dawn Came at Last to Vandajhar" (2024)

== Poetry ==
- Non Compost Mentis: An Affrontery of Limericks and Other Eldritch Metrical Terrors (1995)
- Poetica Dementia: Being a Further Accumulation of Metrical Offenses (1997)
- "Stop Me Before I Do It Again!" (1999)
- They Never Found the Head: Poems of Sentiment & Reflection (2001)
- The Innsmouth Tabernacle Choir Hymnal (2004)
- Groping Towards the Light (2005)
- The Arkham Alphabet Book for Children (2006)
- Ghosts of Past and Future (2008)
- The Second Innsmouth Tabernacle choir Hymnal (2019)
- The Pratfall of Cthulhu and Other Literary Mishaps (2019)
- Dancing Before Azathoth: Macabre and Fantastic Poetry (2025)

== Nonfiction ==
- Lovecraft in the Cinema (1975)
- The Dream Quest of H. P. Lovecraft (1978)
- Conan's World and Robert E. Howard (1978)
- On Writing Science Fiction: The Editors Strike Back! (1981) with John M. Ford and George H. Scithers
- Constructing Scientifiction & Fantasy (1982) with George H. Scithers and John Ashmead
- Pathways to Elfland: The Writings of Lord Dunsany (1989)
- Lord Dunsany: A Bibliography (1993) with S. T. Joshi
- Windows of the Imagination: Essays on Fantastic Literature (1998) [includes essays on H.P. Lovecraft, M.R. James, Richard Middleton, Lord Dunsany, Dracula, Edgar Allan Poe and many reviews.
- Philcon 2003 Program Book (2003)
- The Fantastic Horizon: Essays and Reviews (2009)
- The Threshold of Forever: Essays and Reviews (2017)

== As editor ==
=== Collections ===
- The Ghosts of the Heaviside Layer, and Other Fantasms, by Lord Dunsany (1980)
- The Ginger Cat and Other Lost Plays, by Lord Dunsany (2005)

=== Anthologies ===
- Tales from the Spaceport Bar (1987) with George H. Scithers
- Another Round at the Spaceport Bar (1989) with George H. Scithers
- The Secret History of Vampires (2007)
- Full Moon City (2010) with Martin H. Greenberg
- Cthulhu's Reign (2010)
- That is Not Dead: Tales of the Cthulhu Mythos Through the Centuries (2015)
- Tales from the Miskatonic University Library (2017) with John Ashmead
- Mountains of Madness Revealed (2019)
- Shadows Out of Time (2023)

=== Nonfiction ===
- Essays Lovecraftian (1976)
- Exploring Fantasy Worlds: Essays on Fantastic Literature (1985)
- Discovering Classic Fantasy Fiction (1997)
- Discovering H. P. Lovecraft (1987) (revised and expanded edition of Essays Lovecraftian)
- Discovering Classic Horror Fiction I (1992)
- Discovering Modern Horror Fiction I (1985)
- Discovering Modern Horror Fiction II (1988)
- Discovering Stephen King (1985)
- The Thomas Ligotti Reader (2003)
- The Neil Gaiman Reader (2006)
- The Robert E. Howard Reader (2010)

=== Interview collections ===
- SF Voices (1976)
- Science Fiction Voices #1: Interviews with Science Fiction Writers (1979)
- Science Fiction Voices #5: Interviews with American Science Fiction Writers of the Golden Age (1981)
- Speaking of Horror: Interviews with Writers of the Supernatural (1994)
- Speaking of Horror II: Interviews with 18 Masters of Horror! (2015)
- Speaking of the Fantastic: Interviews with Writers of Science Fiction and Fantasy (2002)
- Speaking of the Fantastic II: Interviews with Masters of Science Fiction and Fantasy (2004)
- Speaking of the Fantastic III: Interviews with Science Fiction Writers (2011)
- Speaking of the Fantastic IV (2018)
- Speaking of the Fantastic V (2024)
