= List of fantasy story collections =

Some notable fantasy short story collections, in alphabetical order by title (some of these collections may also include some science-fiction stories):

== A ==
- The Adventures of Doctor Eszterhazy by Avram Davidson
- And Walk Now Gently Through the Fire by R. A. Lafferty et al.
- Apocalypses (two novellas) by R. A. Lafferty
- The Avram Davidson Treasury by Avram Davidson

== B ==
- The Back Door of History by R. A. Lafferty
- The Barnum Museum by Steven Millhauser
- Best Ghost Stories of J. S. Lefanu by Sheridan Le Fanu
- The Best of Avram Davidson by Avram Davidson
- The Best Tales of Hoffmann by E. T. A. Hoffmann
- Beyond the Wall of Sleep by H.P. Lovecraft
- The Bible Repairman by Tim Powers
- The Bloody Chamber by Angela Carter
- The Book of Fritz Leiber by Fritz Leiber
- The Book of Wonder by Lord Dunsany

== C ==
- Carnacki the Ghost-Finder by William Hope Hodgson
- The Castle of Crossed Destinies (two novellas) by Italo Calvino
- Changing Planes by Ursula K. Le Guin
- Collected Fantasies by Avram Davidson
- Collected Fictions by Jorge Luis Borges
  - an omnibus of all eight volumes of Borges' fiction (which is entirely short stories)
- The Compass Rose by Ursula K. Le Guin
- The Compleat Traveller in Black a.k.a. The Compleat Traveller in Black by John Brunner
- The Complete Chronicles of Conan by Robert E. Howard
- Complete Fairy Tales by George MacDonald
- Complete Fairy Tales by Oscar Wilde
- The Complete Fiction of H.P. Lovecraft
- The Traveller in Black a.k.a. The Compleat Traveller in Black by John Brunner
- Cinderella

== D ==
- Dark Carnival a.k.a. The Small Assassin by Ray Bradbury
- The Darrell Schweitzer Megapack by Darrell Schweitzer
- The Day It Rained Forever a.k.a. A Medicine for Melancholy by Ray Bradbury
- The Devils in the Details by James Blaylock and Tim Powers
- Does Anyone Else Have Something Further to Add? by R. A. Lafferty
- A Dreamer's Tales by Lord Dunsany
- Dreams of Distant Shores by Patricia A. McKillip
- Driving Blind by Ray Bradbury
- The Dying Earth a.k.a. Mazirian the Magician by Jack Vance

== E ==
- The Early Lafferty by R. A. Lafferty
- The Early Lafferty II by R. A. Lafferty
- Echoes of the Goddess by Darrell Schweitzer
- Eight Fantasms and Magics by Jack Vance
- Elementals by A. S. Byatt
- The Emperor of the Ancient Word and Other Fantastic Stories by Darrell Schweitzer
- The Enquiries of Doctor Eszterhazy by Avram Davidson
- Escape on Venus by Edgar Rice Burroughs

== F ==
- Fancies and Goodnights by John Collier
- Fantasy Pieces in Callot's Manner by E. T. A. Hoffmann
- Fifty-One Tales a.k.a. The Food of Death by Lord Dunsany
- Fireworks by Angela Carter
- The Food of Death a.k.a. Fifty-One Tales by Lord Dunsany
- The Fortunes of Brak by John Jakes
- Four Stories by R. A. Lafferty
- Fragile Things by Neil Gaiman
- From the Realm of Morpheus by Steven Millhauser

== G ==
- Ghost Trouble by Richard Parks
- The Ghosts of Manacle by Charles G. Finney
- The Ghosts of the Heaviside Layer, and Other Fantasms by Lord Dunsany
- The Gods of Pegana by Lord Dunsany
- The Golden Apples of the Sun by Ray Bradbury
- Golden Gate and Other Stories by R. A. Lafferty
- The Golden Pot and Other Tales by E. T. A. Hoffmann
- Golden Wings and Other Stories by William Morris
- The Great World and the Small: More Tales of the Ominous and Magical by Darrell Schweitzer
- Green Magic by Jack Vance

== H ==
- The Harold Shea Tales by L. Sprague de Camp and Fletcher Pratt
  - collected in The Incomplete Enchanter, Wall of Serpents, The Compleat Enchanter, The Complete Compleat Enchanter, The Enchanter Reborn, The Exotic Enchanter, and The Mathematics of Magic: The Enchanter Stories of L. Sprague de Camp and Fletcher Pratt
- Harrowing the Dragon by Patricia A. McKillip
- Heart of Stone, Dear and Other Stories by R. A. Lafferty
- Heroes and Horrors by Fritz Leiber
- Heroes in the Wind by Robert E. Howard

== I ==
- I Sing the Body Electric by Ray Bradbury
- The Illustrated Man by Ray Bradbury
- In a Glass Darkly by Sheridan Le Fanu
- In for a Penny by James Blaylock
- In the Penny Arcade by Steven Millhauser
- Invisible Cities by Italo Calvino
- Irish Fairy Tales by James Stephens
- Iron Tears by R. A. Lafferty

== J ==
- John Carter of Mars by Edgar Rice Burroughs
- John the Balladeer by Manly Wade Wellman
- The Jorkens Tales by Lord Dunsany (many but not all are fantasies)
  - collected in The Travel Tales of Mr. Joseph Jorkens, Jorkens Remembers Africa, Jorkens Has a Large Whiskey, The Fourth Book of Jorkens, Jorkens Borrows Another Whiskey, and The Last Book of Jorkens

== K ==
- Kai Lung Beneath the Mulberry Tree by Ernest Bramah
- Kai Lung: Six by Ernest Bramah
- The King in the Tree (three novellas) by Steven Millhauser
- The Knight and Knave of Swords by Fritz Leiber
- The Knife Thrower and Other Stories by Steven Millhauser

== L ==
- The Ladies of Grace Adieu and Other Stories by Susanna Clarke
- Lafferty in Orbit by R. A. Lafferty
- The Last Book of Wonder a.k.a. Tales of Wonder by Lord Dunsany
- ¡Limekiller! by Avram Davidson
- Lin Carter's Simrana Cycle by Lin Carter
- The Line Between by Peter S. Beagle
- Little Black Book of Stories by A. S. Byatt
- Little Kingdoms (three novellas) by Steven Millhauser
- Little Wizard Stories of Oz by L. Frank Baum
- Living With the Dead (The Tale of Old Corpsenberg) by Darrell Schweitzer
- Long After Midnight by Ray Bradbury

== M ==
- The Machineries of Joy by Ray Bradbury
- Madame Crowl's Ghost and Other Tales of Mystery by Sheridan Le Fanu
- The Magician of Karakosk a.k.a. Giant Bones by Peter S. Beagle
- The Man Who Ate the Phoenix by Lord Dunsany
- The Man Who Made Models and Other Stories by R. A. Lafferty
- The Martian Chronicles by Ray Bradbury
- Mazirian the Magician a.k.a. The Dying Earth by Jack Vance
- The Meaning of Life and Other Awesome Cosmic Revelations by Darrell Schweitzer
- A Medicine for Melancholy a.k.a. The Day It Rained Forever by Ray Bradbury
- Mischief Malicious (And Murder Most Strange) by R. A. Lafferty
- Murder By Magic edited by Rosemary Edghill

== N ==
- Necromancies and Netherworlds: Uncanny Stories by Darrell Schweitzer and Jason Van Hollander
- Night Moves and Other Stories by Tim Powers
- Nightscapes: Tales of the Ominous and Magical by Darrell Schweitzer
- Nine Hundred Grandmothers by R. A. Lafferty
- Novelties & Souvenirs by John Crowley
- Numbers in the Dark by Italo Calvino

== O ==
- The October Country by Ray Bradbury
- The Ogre's Wife by Richard Parks
- On the Banks of the River of Heaven by Richard Parks
- One More for the Road by Ray Bradbury
- Or All the Seas with Oysters by Avram Davidson
- The Other Nineteenth Century by Avram Davidson
- The Outsider and Others by H.P. Lovecraft

== P ==
- The Panic Hand by Jonathan Carroll
- Poems and Stories by J. R. R. Tolkien
- Poems in Prose by Oscar Wilde
- Promontory Goats by R. A. Lafferty
- The Purple Pterodactyls by L. Sprague de Camp

== Q ==
- Quicker Than the Eye by Ray Bradbury
- Qfwfq short-story series by Italo Calvino
  - collected in Cosmicomics and t zero (but Numbers in the Dark also contains some Qfwfq stories)

== R ==
- R is for Rocket by Ray Bradbury
- The Redward Edward Papers by Avram Davidson
- Refugees from an Imaginary Country by Darrell Schweitzer
- The Reluctant Shaman and Other Fantastic Tales by L. Sprague de Camp
- The Rhinoceros Who Quoted Nietzsche by Peter S. Beagle
- Ringing Changes by R. A. Lafferty

== S ==
- The Serpent Bride by K.V. Johansen
- S is for Space by Ray Bradbury
- The Second Book of Fritz Leiber by Fritz Leiber
- Sekenre: The Book of the Sorcerer by Darrell Schweitzer
- Shadows & Light: Tales of Lost Kingdoms Edited by Alva J. Roberts
- Skull-Face and Others by Robert E. Howard
- Slightly Off Center by Neal Barrett
- Slippery and Other Stories by R. A. Lafferty
- The Small Assassin a.k.a. Dark Carnival by Ray Bradbury
- Smoke and Mirrors by Neil Gaiman
- Snake in His Bosom and Other Stories by R. A. Lafferty
- Stories of Your Life and Others by Ted Chiang
- Strange Doings by R. A. Lafferty
- Strange Itineraries by Tim Powers
- Strange Seas and Shores by Avram Davidson
- Sugar and Other Stories by A. S. Byatt
- The Sword of Welleran and Other Stories by Lord Dunsany
- Swords Against Death by Fritz Leiber
- Swords Against Wizardry by Fritz Leiber
- Swords and Deviltry by Fritz Leiber
- Swords and Ice Magic by Fritz Leiber
- Swords in the Mist by Fritz Leiber

== T ==
- Tales from Earthsea by Ursula K. Le Guin
- Tales from Gavagan's Bar by L. Sprague de Camp and Fletcher Pratt
- Tales from the Perilous Realm by J. R. R. Tolkien
- Tales of E. T. A. Hoffmann by E. T. A. Hoffmann
- Tales of God and Men cycle by Lord Dunsany
  - comprises The Gods of Pegana, Time and the Gods, The Sword of Welleran, A Dreamer's Tales, The Book of Wonder, Fifty-One Tales (a.k.a. The Food of Death), The Last Book of Wonder, and Tales of Three Hemispheres
- Tales of Hoffmann by E. T. A. Hoffmann
- The Tales of the Genii by James Ridley
- Tales of Three Hemispheres by Lord Dunsany
- Tales of Three Planets by Edgar Rice Burroughs
- Tales of Wonder a.k.a. The Last Book of Wonder by Lord Dunsany
- Thirteen Phantasms by James Blaylock
- Through Elegant Eyes: Stories of Austro and the Men Who Know Everything by R. A. Lafferty
- Time and the Gods by Lord Dunsany
- Tom O'Bedlam's Night Out and Other Strange Excursions by Darrell Schweitzer
- The Toynbee Convector by Ray Bradbury
- Transients and Other Disquieting Stories by Darrell Schweitzer
- The Tritonian Ring and Other Pusadian Tales by L. Sprague de Camp

== U ==
- Unfinished Tales by J. R. R. Tolkien

== V ==
- Viriconium Nights by M. John Harrison

== W ==
- The Wallet of Kai Lung by Ernest Bramah
- The Watcher and Other Stories by Italo Calvino
- We Are All Legends by Darrell Schweitzer
- What Strange Stars and Skies by Avram Davidson
- Whimsical Tales of Douglas Jerrold by Douglas Jerrold
- Wonders of the Invisible World by Patricia A. McKillip
- Worshipping Small Gods by Richard Parks

== Y ==
- Yamada Monogatari: Demon Hunter by Richard Parks
- Yamada Monogatari: Troubled Spirits by Richard Parks
- Young Thongor by Lin Carter

== Z ==
Novels and science-fiction short-story collections should not be included here: they have their own lists.
