= The Children of Chorazin and Other Strange Denizens =

2023 collection of short stories by Darrell Schweitzer

- Cover of The Children of Chorazin and Other Strange Denizens
- Author: Darrell Schweitzer
- Cover artist: Jason Van Hollander
- Language: English
- Genre: Fantasy, horror
- Publisher: Hippocampus Press
- Publication date: 2023
- Publication place: United States
- Media type: Print (paperback), ebook
- Pages: 276
- ISBN: 9781614984009
- OCLC: 1381068333

The Children of Chorazin and Other Strange Denizens is a collection of dark fantasy and horror short stories by American writer Darrell Schweitzer. It was first published in trade paperback and ebook by Hippocampus Press in April 2023.

== Summary ==
The collection consists of twenty-six stories by the author, originally published from 2000 to 2022 in various speculative fiction magazines and anthologies.

== Contents ==
- "Uncle's in the Treetops" (from What October Brings: A Lovecraftian Celebration of Halloween, Sep. 2018)
- "The Red Witch of Chorazin" (from Black Wings V: New Tales of Lovecraftian Horror, May 2016)
- "The Girl in the Attic" (from Black Wings VI: New Tales of Lovecraftian Horror, Nov. 2017)
- "The Hutchison Boy" (from The Dragons of the Night, May 2016)
- "Not in the Card Catalog" (from Tales from the Miskatonic University Library, Feb. 2017)
- "Down to a Sunless Sea" (from Mountains of Madness Revealed, Sep. 2019)
- "A Prism of Darkness" (from Black Wings IV, Feb. 2015)
- "No Signal" (from The Grimscribe's Puppets, Jul. 1913)
- "Come, Follow Me" (from That Is Not Dead, Feb. 2015)
- "Odd Man Out" (from Cemetery Dance no. 71, May 2014)
- "Madness on the Black Planet" (from Tomorrow's Cthulhu: Stories at the Dawn of Posthumanity, Jan. 2016)
- "Going to Ground" (from Searchers After Horror: New Tales of the Weird and Fantastic, 2014)
- "The Martian Bell" (from Nameless: A Journal of the Macabre Esoteric and Intellectual v. 2, iss. 4, Dec. 2019)
- "Were—?" (from Flesh Like Smoke, Jul. 2015)
- "Boxes of Dead Children" (from Weirdbook 31, Sep. 2015)
- "The Return of the Night-Gaunts" (from His Own Most Fantastic Creation: Stories About H. P. Lovecraft, 2020)
- "All Kings and Princes Bow Down unto Me" (from Penumbra: A Journal of Weird Fiction and Criticism, 2021, Sep. 2021)
- "The Festival of the Pallid Mask" (from Under Twin Suns: Alternate Histories of the Yellow Sign, Jun. 2021)
- "A Dark Miracle" (from Black Gate v. 1, no. 3, Win. 2002)
- "A Predicament" (from Nightmare's Realm: New Tales of the Weird and Fantastic, Mar. 2017)
- "The Thief of Dreams" (from Apostles of the Weird, Apr. 2020)
- "Killing the Pale Man" (from Penumbra: A Journal of Weird Fiction and Criticism, 2022, Sep. 2022)
- "Appeasing the Darkness" (from Strange Attraction, Aug. 2000)
- "The Bear Went Over the Mountain"
- "The Interrogator" (from Short Things: Tales Inspired by "Who Goes There?" by John W. Campbell, Jr., Oct. 2019)
- "The White Face"
- "Acknowledgments"
