= Tom O'Bedlam's Night Out and Other Strange Excursions =

1985 collection of short stories by Darrell Schweitzer

- Cover of Tom O'Bedlam's Night Out and Other Strange Excursions
- Author: Darrell Schweitzer
- Illustrator: Stephen E. Fabian
- Cover artist: Stephen E. Fabian
- Language: English
- Genre: Fantasy
- Publisher: W. Paul Ganley
- Publication date: 1985
- Publication place: United States
- Media type: Print (hardcover)
- Pages: 191 p
- ISBN: 0-932445-15-2
- OCLC: 13335003

Tom O'Bedlam's Night Out and Other Strange Excursions is a collection of dark fantasy short stories by American writer Darrell Schweitzer. It was first published in hardcover and trade paperback by W. Paul Ganley in November 1985. An electronic edition was published by Necon E-Books in December 2012 as no. 20 of its Necon Classic Horror series. The copyright statement of the Necon edition states that it "incorporates the author's final revisions and should be regarded as definitive."

== Summary ==
The collection consists of nineteen early works of the author; three tales about legendary madman Tom O'Bedlam followed by two in the far future setting of his novel The Shattered Goddess and collection Echoes of the Goddess and thirteen other stories (one a collaboration with John Gregory Betancourt) and a poem. Most of the pieces were originally published from 1973-1985 in various speculative fiction magazines and anthologies; the remainder are original to the collection.

== Contents ==
- "Tom O'Bedlam's Night Out" (from Fantastic v. 26, no. 3, September 1977)
- "Raving Lunacy" (from Amazing Stories v. 55, no. 2, July 1981)
- "Continued Lunacy" (from Amazing Science Fiction v. 56, no. 5, March 1983)
- "The Story of a Dadar" (from Amazing Science Fiction Stories v. 56, no. 1, June 1982)
- "A Lantern Maker of Ai Hanlo" (from Amazing Stories v. 58, no. 2, July 1984)
- "The Story of Obbok" (from Whispers no. 2, December 1973)
- "The Outcast" [poem] (from Eerie Country no. 4, 1980)
- "The Pretenses of Hinyar" (from Amra v. 2, no. 69, January 1981)
- "The Story of the Brown Man" (from Fantasy Crosswinds no. 1, January 1977)
- "The Last of the Shadow Titans" (from Amazing Stories v. 59, no. 2, July 1985)
- "The Stranger from Baal-Ad-Theon"
- "The Bermuda Triangle Explained"
- "The Adventure in the House of Phaon"
- "The Last Child of Masferigon" (with John Gregory Betancourt)
- "A Vision of Rembathene" (from Fantasy Crossroads no. 10/11, March 1977)
- "Jungle Eyes" (from Rod Serling's The Twilight Zone Magazine v. 5, no. 2, May/June 1985)
- "Sunrise" (from Pulpsmith, Winter 1983)
- "The Game of Sand and Fire" (revised from "A Part of the Game" from The Dragon no. 51, 1981)
- "The Wings of the White Bird" (from Myrddin no. 4, 1978)

== Reception ==
The collection was reviewed by William F. Touponce in Fantasy Review, June 1986, Neal Wilgus in Science Fiction Review, Winter 1986, John Gregory Betancourt in Fantasy Book, March 1987, and Stefan Dziemianowicz in Crypt of Cthulhu no. 48, St. John's Eve 1987.
