= The Great World and the Small: More Tales of the Ominous and Magical =

2001 collection of short stories by Darrell Schweitzer

- Author: Darrell Schweitzer
- Illustrator: Jason Van Hollander
- Cover artist: Jason Van Hollander
- Language: English
- Genre: Fantasy
- Publisher: Cosmos Books/Wildside Press
- Publication date: 2001
- Publication place: United States
- Media type: Print (hardcover)
- Pages: 171
- ISBN: 978-1-58715-345-7
- OCLC: 63075963

The Great World and the Small: More Tales of the Ominous and Magical is a collection of dark fantasy short stories by American writer Darrell Schweitzer. It was first published in hardcover and trade paperback by Cosmos Books/Wildside Press in July 2001.

== Summary ==
The collection consists of sixteen works of the author, including one of his tales about the legendary madman Tom O'Bedlam. The pieces were originally published from 1978-2000 in various speculative fiction magazines and anthologies.

== Contents ==
- "The Dragon of Camlann" (from The Chronicles of the Round Table, 1997)
- "Believing in the Twentieth Century" (from Terra Incognita no. 1, Win. 1996/1997)
- "Ghost" (from Interzone no. 139, Jan. 1999)
- "The Adventure of the Death-Fetch" (from The Game is Afoot, 1994)
- "The Unwanted Grail" (from The Chronicles of the Holy Grail, Nov. 1996)
- "I Told You So" (from Zodiac Fantastic, Sep. 1997)
- "The Murder of Etelven Thios" (from Weirdbook no. 14, Jun. 1979)
- "The Other Murder of Etelven Thios" (from Weirdbook no. 15, 1981)
- "The Final? Murder? of Etelven Thios?" (from Weirdbook no. 15, 1981)
- "Wanderers and Travellers We Were" (from Andromeda 3, 1978)
- "Silkie Son" (from Weirdbook no. 29, Aut. 1995)
- "Just Suppose" (from Horrors! 365 Scary Stories, Oct. 1998)
- "We Are the Dead" (from The Horror Show v. 6, no. 4, Win. 1988)
- "Tom O'Bedlam and the King of Dreams" (from Weird Tales v. 56, no. 1, Fall 1999)
- "The Invisible Knight's Squire" (from Marion Zimmer Bradley's Fantasy Magazine, no. 48, Sum. 2000)
- "The Great World and the Small" (from Marion Zimmer Bradley's Fantasy Magazine no. 18, Win. 1993)
