= The Emperor of the Ancient Word and Other Fantastic Stories =

2013 collection of short stories by Darrell Schweitzer

- Cover of The Emperor of the Ancient Word and Other Fantastic Stories
- Author: Darrell Schweitzer
- Cover artist: Jason Van Hollander
- Language: English
- Genre: Fantasy
- Publisher: Borgo Press/Wildside Press
- Publication date: 2013
- Publication place: United States
- Media type: Print (paperback)
- Pages: 229
- ISBN: 978-1-4794-0105-5

The Emperor of the Ancient Word and Other Fantastic Stories is a collection of fantasy short stories by American writer Darrell Schweitzer. It was first published as a trade paperback by Wildside Press in May 2013, with an ebook edition following in October of the same year.

== Summary ==
The collection consists of seventeen stories of the author, together with an introductory note by the author. It includes two tales dealing with the titular Emperor of the Ancient Word and one of Schweitzer's tales about the legendary madman Tom O'Bedlam. The pieces were originally published from 2000-2011 in various speculative fiction magazines and anthologies. Schweitzer characterizes them in his introductory note as "some of my best stories from the past ten years or so."

== Contents ==
- "Introductory Note"
- "At the Top of the Black Stairs" (from Realms of Fantasy, October 2005)
- "The Hero Spoke" (from Realms of Fantasy, August 2006)
- "Tom O'Bedlam and the Mystery of Love" (from The Enchanter Completed: A Tribute Anthology for L. Sprague de Camp, May 2005)
- "The Fire Eggs" (from Interzone no. 153, March 2000)
- "The Dead Kid" (from The Book of More Flesh, Oct. 2002)
- "Fighting the Zeppelin Gang" (from Postscripts no. 8, Autumn 2006)
- "Sweep Me to My Revenge!" (from Talebones no. 35, Summer 2007)
- "A Lost City of the Jungle" (from Astounding Hero Tales, April 2007)
- "Our Father Down Below" (from Cemetery Dance no. 35, 2001)
- "The Messenger" (from Weird Tales v. 62, no. 5, November/December 2007)
- "The Last of the Giants of Albion" (from Legends of the Pendragon, September 2002)
- "How It Ended" (from Realms of Fantasy, August 2002)
- "Thousand Year Warrior" (from Space and Time no. 105, Fall 2008)
- "Into the Gathering Dark" (from Black Gate no. 15, Spring 2011)
- "Secret Murders" (from Cemetery Dance no. 39, July 2002)
- "Saxon Midnight" (from The Doom of Camelot, August 2000)
- "The Emperor of the Ancient Word" (from Space and Time no. 99, Spring 2005)
