= Refugees from an Imaginary Country =

1999 collection of short stories by Darrell Schweitzer

- Author: Darrell Schweitzer
- Illustrator: Stephen E. Fabian
- Cover artist: Stephen E. Fabian
- Language: English
- Genre: Fantasy
- Publisher: W. Paul Ganley/Owlswick Press
- Publication date: 1999
- Publication place: United States
- Media type: Print (hardcover)
- Pages: 232
- ISBN: 0-932445-64-0
- OCLC: 48609840

Refugees from an Imaginary Country is a collection of dark fantasy short stories by American writer Darrell Schweitzer. It was first published in hardcover and trade paperback by W. Paul Ganley and Owlswick Press in March 1999.

== Summary ==
The collection consists of nineteen early works of the author, including one of his tales about the legendary madman Tom O'Bedlam. The pieces were originally published from 1988-1997 in various speculative fiction magazines and anthologies.

== Contents ==
- "Savages" (from Masques IV, Oct. 1991)
- "On the Last Night of the Festival of the Dead" (from Interzone no. 90, Dec. 1994)
- "The Outside Man" (from Narrow Houses, Dec. 1992)
- "Minotauress" (from Amazing Stories v. 65, no. 6, Mar. 1991)
- "Malevendra's Pool" (from Marion Zimmer Bradley's Fantasy, Aut. 1989)
- "Angry Man" (from Fear no. 16, Apr. 1990)
- "The Sorcerer Evoragdou" (from The Ultimate Witch, Oct. 1993)
- "The Strange Rider from the Far, Dark Land" (from Pulphouse no. 6, 1990)
- "The Mysteries of the Faceless King" (from Weird Tales v. 50, no. 1, Spr. 1988)
- "Runaway" (from I, Vampire, Sep. 1995)
- "The Knight of Pale Countenance" (from The Merlin Chronicles, Oct. 1995)
- "One of the Secret Masters" (from Dark Destiny, Dec. 1994)
- "Climbing" (from After Hours no. 25, Win. 1995)
- "The Death of Falstaff" (from Shakespearean Whodunnits, 1997)
- "King Yvorian's Wager" (from Weird Tales v. 51, no. 2, Win. 1989/1990)
- "Going to the Mountain" (from Monochrome: The Readercon Anthology, 1990)
- "The Last Dangerous Lunacy" (from Amazing Stories v. 63, no. 3, Sep. 1988)
- "Last Things" (from Classical Whodunnits, Oct. 1996)
- "Refugees from an Imaginary Country" (from Interzone no. 116, Feb. 1997)

== Reception ==
Tom Easton in Analog Science Fiction and Fact characterizes the collection as "nineteen very entertaining fantasies," of which "[s]ome are dark, some are jolly, [and] all are deft and often witty." He singles out the Tom O'Bedlam story "The Last Dangerous Lunacy," which he "quite enjoyed," for particular comment. Concluding, he states "It is the wit that makes Schweitzer's work stand out. I commend it to you."

The collection was also reviewed by Carolyn Cushman in Locus no. 460, May 1999, Chris Gilmore in Interzone no. 151, January 2000, Paul Di Filippo in Asimov's Science Fiction, February 2000, and Kathryn S. Morrow in The New York Review of Science Fiction, January 2001.
