= Nightscapes: Tales of the Ominous and Magical =

2000 collection of short stories by Darrell Schweitzer

- Cover of Nightscapes: Tales of the Ominous and Magical
- Author: Darrell Schweitzer
- Illustrator: Jason Van Hollander
- Cover artist: Jason Van Hollander
- Language: English
- Genre: Fantasy
- Publisher: Wildside Press
- Publication date: 2000
- Publication place: United States
- Media type: Print (hardcover)
- Pages: 220
- ISBN: 978-1-58715-060-9
- OCLC: 70136682

Nightscapes: Tales of the Ominous and Magical is a collection of dark fantasy short stories by American writer Darrell Schweitzer. It was first published in hardcover and trade paperback by Wildside Press in April 2000.

== Summary ==
The collection consists of seventeen early works of the author, including one of his tales about the legendary madman Tom O'Bedlam. The pieces were originally published from 1973-1999 in various speculative fiction magazines and anthologies.

== Contents ==
- "A Servant of Satan" (from Interzone no. 136, Oct. 1998)
- "Adam" (from Cemetery Dance no. 24, Sum. 1996)
- "The Liar's Mouth" (from Cemetery Dance no. 16, Sum. 1993)
- "The Voice of Bel-Hemad" (from Fantasy Book v. 5, no. 3, Sep. 1986)
- "Bitter Chivalry" (from Realms of Fantasy v. 5, no. 3, Feb. 1999)
- "Caliban's Revenge" (from Weirdbook no. 13, May 1978)
- "In the Evening of Dreams" (from Weirdbook no. 6, Jan. 1973)
- "The Witch of the World's End" (from 100 Wicked Little Witch Stories, 1995)
- "On the Holy Mountain" (from Marion Zimmer Bradley's Fantasy Magazine no. 25, Fall 1994)
- "Smart Guy" (from Dante's Disciples, Feb. 1996)
- "Return from Exile" (from Terra Incognita no. 3, Sum. 1998)
- "Kvetchula" (from Marion Zimmer Bradley's Fantasy Magazine no. 36, Sum. 1997)
- "The Silence in Kandretiphon" (from Adventures in Sword & Sorcery no. 3, 1996)
- "Running to Camelot" (from Marion Zimmer Bradley's Fantasy Magazine no. 40, Sum. 1998)
- "Told by Moonlight" (from The Camelot Chronicles, Aug. 1992)
- "The Epilogue of the Sword" (from Excalibur, May 1995)
- "Time Enough for Lunacy" (from Weirdbook no. 25, Aut. 1990)

== Reception ==
The collection was reviewed by Chris Gilmore in Interzone no. 160, October 2000, Paul Di Filippo in Asimov's Science Fiction, February 2001, and Nick Gevers in Nova Express, Spring/Summer 2001.
