= Awaiting Strange Gods: Weird and Lovecraftian Fictions =

2015 collection of short stories by Darrell Schweitzer

- Cover of Awaiting Strange Gods: Weird and Lovecraftian Fictions
- Author: Darrell Schweitzer
- Illustrator: Tim Kirk
- Cover artist: Tim Kirk
- Language: English
- Genre: Fantasy, horror
- Publisher: Fedogan & Bremer
- Publication date: 2015
- Publication place: United States
- Media type: Print (hardcover)
- Pages: v, 276
- ISBN: 9781878252753
- OCLC: 914216916

Awaiting Strange Gods: Weird and Lovecraftian Fictions is a collection of dark fantasy and horror short stories by American writer Darrell Schweitzer. It was first published in hardcover and trade paperback by Fedogan & Bremer in September 2015.

== Summary ==
The collection consists of twenty-three stories of the author, two of them collaborative, together with an introduction by Lovecraftian scholar S. T. Joshi. The pieces were originally published from 1994 to 2015 in various speculative fiction magazines and anthologies.

== Contents ==
- "Introduction" (S. T. Joshi)
- "Envy, the Gardens of Ynath, and the Sin of Cain" (from Interzone no. 178, April 2002)
- "Hanged Man and Ghost" (from The Weird Fiction Review no. 5, November 2014)
- "Stragglers from Carrhae" (from World War Cthulhu: A Collection of Lovecraftian War Stories, August 2014)
- "The Eater of Hours" (from Allen K's Inhuman Magazine no. 4, Summer 2009)
- "The Runners Beyond the Wall" (from Weird Tales v. 66, no. 4, Fall 2012)
- "On the Eastbound Train" (from Madness on the Orient Express, December 2014)
- "Howling in the Dark" (from Black Wings: New Tales of Lovecraftian Horror, April 2010)
- "Sometimes You Have to Shout about It" (from H. P. Lovecraft's Magazine of Horror no. 4, Spring-Summer 2007)
- "The Head Shop in Arkham"
- "Innsmouth Idyll" (from Dead But Dreaming 2, June 2011)
- "Class Reunion" (from Dead But Dreaming 2, June 2011)
- "Why We Do It" (from Dead But Dreaming, March 2002)
- "The Warm" (from The Madness of Cthulhu: Volume 1, October 2014)
- "Spiderwebs in the Dark" (from Black Wings of Cthulhu 3, March 2015)
- "Whispers from Forgotten Realms"
- "The Corpse Detective"
- "Jimmy Bunny" (from Shock Totem 5: Curious Tales of the Macabre and Twisted, October 2012)
- "The Last of the Black Wind"
- "In Old Commoriom" (from Deepest, Darkest Eden: New Tales of Hyperborea, August 2013)
- "The Clockwork King, the Queen of Glass, and the Man with a Hundred Knives" (from Black Wings II: New Tales of Lovecraftian Horror, June 2012)
- "The Scroll of the Worm" (from The Horror Express no. 2, June 2004) (with Jason Van Hollander)
- "Those of the Air" (from Cthulhu's Heirs: Tales of the Mythos for the New Millennium, March 1994) (with Jason Van Hollander)
- "Ghost Dancing" (from Cthulhu's Reign, April 2010)

== Reception ==
Don D'Ammassa notes that this "collection of Schweitzer’s Lovecraftian stories" displays "differing tones and narrative styles ... [using] a variety of physical and historical settings ... and occasionally ... touches of surrealism to enhance the weird atmosphere." He declares "Hanged Man and Ghost" among his "favorite stories here," with "Innsmouth Idyll" "also quite good," and "Spiderwebs in the Dark" and "The Clockwork King, the Queen of Glass, and the Man with the Hundred Knives" "also worth mentioning." He finds "[e]ven the weakest stories ... entertaining."

Reviewing the book in Black Static magazine, Peter Tennant described Awaiting Strange Gods as "a strong collection, one in which the author plays with familiar tropes and ideas, most of the time ringing new changes and making them his own."
