= Necromancies and Netherworlds: Uncanny Stories =

1999 collection of dark fantasy short stories by Darrell Schweitzer

- Cover of Necromancies and Netherworlds: Uncanny Stories
- Author: Darrell Schweitzer, Jason Van Hollander
- Illustrator: Jason Van Hollander
- Cover artist: Jason Van Hollander
- Language: English
- Genre: Fantasy
- Publisher: Borgo Press/Wildside Press
- Publication date: 1999
- Publication place: United States
- Media type: Print (hardcover)
- Pages: 168
- ISBN: 978-1-880448-66-3

Necromancies and Netherworlds: Uncanny Stories is a collection of dark fantasy short stories by American writer Darrell Schweitzer in collaboration with illustrator Jason Van Hollander. It was first published in hardcover and trade paperback by Borgo Press/Wildside Press in August 1999. It was nominated for the 2000 World Fantasy Award for Best Collection.

== Summary ==
The collection consists of ten works of the authors. The pieces were originally published from 1990-1996 in various speculative fiction magazines and anthologies.

== Contents ==
- "The Crystal-Man" (from Interzone no. 111, Sep. 1996)
- "The Cloth Gods of Zhamir" (from Weird Tales v. 52, no. 4, Sum. 1991)
- "Men Without Maps" (from Marion Zimmer Bradley's Fantasy Magazine no. 11, Win. 1991)
- "The Caravan of the Dead" (from Weirdbook no. 27, Spr. 1992)
- "The Unmaker of Men" (from Weird Tales v. 52, no. 1, Fall 1990)
- "The Magical Dilemma of Mondesir" (from Century no. 2, May/Jun. 1995)
- "The Paloverde Lodge" (from Fear no. 28, Win. 1990)
- "Those of the Air" (from Cthulhu’s Heirs: Tales of the Mythos for the New Millennium, Mar. 1994)
- "The Throwing Suit" (from The Horror Show v. 8, no. 1, Spr. 1990)
- "The Man in the White Mask" (from Worlds of Fantasy & Horror v. 1, no. 1, Sum. 1994)

== Reception ==
The collection was reviewed by Chris Gilmore in Interzone no. 155, May 2000, and Paul Di Filippo in Asimov's Science Fiction, August 2000.
