= The Way to a Man's Heart =

(The) Way to a Man's Heart may refer to:

- "The Way to a Man's Heart", a horror story by Marilyn "Mattie" Brahen in Tales from the Miskatonic University Library (2017)
- "The Way to a Man's Heart", a fantasy story by Esther Friesner in Chicks in Chainmail (1995)
- The Way to a Man's Heart, a 1989 novel by Debbie Macomber
- "The Way to a Man's Heart", an episode of the TV series Gimme a Break
- "Way to a Man's Heart", an episode of the TV series Letterkenny
- The Settlement Cook Book, subtitled The Way to a Man's Heart, a cookbook by Lizzie Black Kander

== See also ==
- List of proverbial phrases
