= Tales of Wonder =

Tales of Wonder may refer to:

- Tales of Wonder (magazine), a science fiction magazine published from 1937 to 1942
- Tales of Wonder (album), an album by White Heart
- The Last Book of Wonder or Tales of Wonder, a 1916 short story collection written by Lord Dunsany
