= Deadly Things: A Collection of Mysterious Tales / The Judgment of the Gods and Other Verdicts of History =

- Cover of Deadly Things: A Collection of Mysterious Tales / The Judgment of the Gods and Other Verdicts of History
- Author: Darrell Schweitzer and Robert Reginald
- Language: English
- Genre: Fantasy, historical mystery
- Publisher: Borgo Press/Wildside Press
- Publication date: 2011
- Publication place: United States
- Media type: Print (paperback)
- Pages: 149 + 123
- ISBN: 978-1-4344-1205-8

Deadly Things: A Collection of Mysterious Tales / The Judgment of the Gods and Other Verdicts of History is an omnibus of two collections of fantastic historical mystery short stories issued in dos-à-dos format; Deadly Things: A Collection of Mysterious Tales, by American writer Darrell Schweitzer, and The Judgment of the Gods and Other Verdicts of History, by Robert Reginald. It was first published as a trade paperback by Borgo Press/Wildside Press in January 2011 as the second number in its Wildside Mystery Double series. The omnibus's constituent collections were not published separately.

== Deadly Things ==
Deadly Things: A Collection of Mysterious Tales by Darrell Schweitzer consists of nine stories originally published from 1990-2007 in various mystery anthologies and two magazines. Four stories are set in imperial Rome and Byzantium (the first two with Pliny the Younger as the detective), two have Shakespearian settings, and three feature Sherlock Holmes in the Victorian era. One story, "In a Byzantine Garden," is not actually a mystery, but an acute psychological portrait of the two opposing main characters.

=== Contents ===
- "Some Unpublished Correspondence of the Younger Pliny" (from The Mammoth Book of Roman Whodunnits, 2003)
- "The Stolen Venus" (from Alfred Hitchcock's Mystery Magazine, Oct. 2008)
- "Last Things" (from The Mammoth Book of Classical Whodunnits, 1996)
- "In a Byzantine Garden" (from Paradox no. 11, Aut. 2007)
- "The Death of Falstaff" (from Shakespearean Whodunnits, 1997)
- "Murdered by Love" (from Shakespearean Detectives, 1998)
- "The Adventure of the Death-Fetch" (from The Game is Afoot, 1994)
- "Sherlock Holmes, Dragon-Slayer" (from Resurrected Holmes, 1996)
- "The Adventure of the Hanoverian Vampires" (from 100 Crafty Cat Crimes, 1990)

== The Judgment of the Gods ==
The Judgment of the Gods and Other Verdicts of History by Robert Reginald consists of four stories, three originally published from 1998-2005 in various mystery anthologies and one published for the first time in the collection. One investigates the events surrounding the murder of King Sennacherib of ancient Assyria; the other three are set in the time of William of Occam and utilize him as their protagonist. The Occam stories can be regarded as fantasy mysteries, as he and his young assistant Thaddeus utilize magic in their investigations; in "Occam's Measure" (original to the collection) their opponents do as well.

=== Contents ===
- "Introduction: The Verdict of History"
- "The Judgment of the Gods" (from The Mammoth Book of Historical Whodunnits, 2005)
- "Occam's Razor" (from On Crusade: More Tales of the Knights Templar, May 1998)
- "Occam's Treasure" (from Crusade of Fire: Mystical Tales of the Knights Templar, Dec. 2002)
- "Occam's Measure"
