= Transients and Other Disquieting Stories =

1993 collection of short stories by Darrell Schweitzer

- Author: Darrell Schweitzer
- Illustrator: Stephen E. Fabian
- Cover artist: Stephen E. Fabian
- Language: English
- Genre: Fantasy
- Publisher: W. Paul Ganley
- Publication date: 1993
- Publication place: United States
- Media type: Print (hardcover)
- Pages: 191
- ISBN: 0-932445-56-X
- OCLC: 30666564

Transients and Other Disquieting Stories is a collection of dark fantasy short stories by American writer Darrell Schweitzer. It was first published in hardcover and trade paperback by W. Paul Ganley in April 1993. It was nominated for the 1994 World Fantasy Award for Best Collection. An electronic edition was published by Necon E-Books in 2011 as no. 10 of its Necon Classic Horror series. The copyright statement of the Necon edition states that it "incorporates the author's final revisions and should be regarded as definitive."

== Summary ==
The collection consists of fifteen early works of the author. The pieces were originally published from 1986-1991 in various speculative fiction magazines and anthologies.

== Contents ==
- "Transients" (from Amazing Stories v. 61, no. 5, Jan. 1987)
- "Peeling It Off" (from Borderlands, Oct. 1990)
- "The Throwing Suit" (with Jason Van Hollander) (from The Horror Show v. 8, no. 1, Spr. 1990)
- "Jason, Come Home" (from Night Cry v. 2, no. 2, Win. 1986)
- "Pennies from Hell" (from Night Cry v. 2, no. 3, Spr. 1987)
- "The Man Who Found the Heart of the Forest" (from Pulphouse no. 5, Fall 1989)
- "Clocks" (from The Horror Show v. 7, no. 1, Spr. 1989)
- "Soft" (from Weird Tales v. 51, no. 3, Spr. 1990)
- "Leaving" (from Night Cry v. 1, no. 5, Spr. 1986)
- "Short and Nasty" (from Obsessions, May 1991)
- "The Man Who Wasn't Nice to Pumpkin Head Dolls" (from Rod Serling's The Twilight Zone Magazine v. 8, no. 5, Dec. 1988)
- "The Children of Lommos" (with John Gregory Betancourt) (from Night Cry v. 2, no. 4, Sum. 1987)
- "Seeing Them" (from The Horror Show v. 7, no. 1, Spr. 1989)
- "The Paloverde Lodge" (with Jason Van Hollander) (from Fear no. 21, Sep. 1990)
- "The Spirit of the Back Stairs" (from Fear no. 28, Apr. 1991)

== Reception ==
A.M.B. Amantia, writing in Library Journal, found the collection "[d]isappointing," noting that "[t]hese horror tales aim for disquiet rather than terror, but they evoke neither subtle unease nor even a grosser case of the shivers. Many of the stories open promisingly, and with an interesting premise, but the carry-through just isn't there."

The collection was also reviewed by Don D'Ammassa in Science Fiction Chronicle no. 164, July 1993, and Stefan Dziemianowicz in Crypt of Cthulhu no. 84, Lammas 1993.
