= Living with the Dead =

Living with the Dead may refer to:

- Living with the Dead (film), a 2002 supernatural thriller
- Living with the Dead (novel), a novel by Kelley Armstrong
- Living with the Dead (TV series), a UK paranormal investigation show
- Living with the Dead, a book about the Grateful Dead by Rock Scully
- Living with the Dead (The Tale of Old Corpsenberg), a collection of fantasy stories by Darrell Schweitzer
