= The Secret History of Vampires =

2007 anthology edited by Darrell Schweitzer

- Cover of first edition
- Author: edited by Darrell Schweitzer
- Language: English
- Genre: Fantasy/horror
- Publisher: DAW Books
- Publication date: 2007
- Publication place: United States
- Media type: Print (paperback)
- Pages: 310
- ISBN: 978-0-7564-0410-9

The Secret History of Vampires is an anthology of original fantasy/horror historical short stories edited by American writer Darrell Schweitzer. It was first published in paperback by DAW Books in April 2007.

== Summary ==
The book collects thirteen novelettes and short stories by various authors, with an introduction by the editor.

== Contents ==
- "Introduction" (Darrell Schweitzer)
- "Under St. Peter's" (Harry Turtledove)
- "Two Hunters in Manhattan" (Mike Resnick)
- "Smoke and Mirrors" (P. D. Cacek)
- "Garbo Quits" (Ron Goulart)
- "Blood of Dreams" (Sarah A. Hoyt)
- "A Princess of Spain" (Carrie Vaughn)
- "Harpy" (Chelsea Quinn Yarbro)
- "Honored Be Her Name" (John Gregory Betancourt and Darrell Schweitzer)
- "Ill-Met in Ilium" (Gregory Frost)
- "The Temptation of Saint Anthony" (Brian Stableford)
- "Bohemian Rhapsody" (Ian Watson)
- "Green Wallpaper" (Tanith Lee)
- "Sepulchres of the Undead" (Keith Taylor)
- "About the Authors"
