= The Neil Gaiman Reader =

- The Neil Gaiman Reader edited by Darrell Schweitzer, Wildside Press, 2007
- Author: Darrell Schweitzer (editor)
- Cover artist: Kirk Alberts
- Language: English
- Genre: Essays
- Publisher: Wildside Press
- Publication date: 2007
- Publication place: United States
- Media type: Print (hardback & paperback)
- Pages: 223 p.
- ISBN: 978-0-8095-5625-0
- OCLC: 70882029

The Neil Gaiman Reader: Essays and Explorations is a collection of essays on fantasy and horror writer Neil Gaiman and his works, edited by Darrell Schweitzer. It was first published in hardcover and trade paperback in 2007 by Wildside Press.

The book consists of sixteen essays by various authors, together with an introduction by the editor, two interviews of Gaiman and a bibliography of his published works.

== Contents ==
- "Introduction to a Very Large Subject" (Darrell Schweitzer)
- "Campbell and 'The Sandman': Reminding Us of the Sacred" (Stephen Rauch)
- "Dreams and Fairy Tales: The Theme of Rationality in 'A Midsummer Night's Dream' and 'The Sandman'" (Julie Myers Saxton)
- "The King Forsakes His Throne: Campbellian Hero Icons in Neil Gaiman's 'Sandman'" (Peter S. Rawlik, Jr.)
- "Blue and Pink: Gender in Neil Gaiman's Work" (Mary Borsellino)
- "Gods and Other Monsters: A Sandman Exit Interview and Philosophical Omnibus" (Robert K. Elder)
- "Neil Gaiman in Words and Pictures" (Ben P. Indick)
- "Pay Attention: There May or May Not Be a Man Behind the Curtain, An Analysis of Neil Gaiman and Dave McKean's 'Violent Cases'" (JaNell Golden)
- "An Autopsy of Storytelling: Metafiction and Neil Gaiman" (Chris Dowd)
- "Tapdancing on the Shoulders of Giants: Neil Gaiman's 'Stardust' and its Antecedents" (Darrell Schweitzer)
- "The Old Switcheroo: A Study in Neil Gaiman's Use of Character Reversal" (Jason Erik Lundberg)
- "Backstage" (William Alexander)
- "No Need to Choose: A Magnificent Anarchy of Belief" (Bethany Alexander)
- "The Thin Line Between" (Marilyn 'Mattie' Brahen)
- "On the Death of Mad King Sweeny: Irish Lore and Literature in 'American Gods'" (William Alexander)
- "Catharsis and the American God: Neil Gaiman" (Baba Singh)
- "The Frame and the Flashback: Analyzing Neil Gaiman's Story 'Murder Mysteries'" (Marilyn "Mattie" Brahen)
- "'Coraline' – A Quest for Identity" (Mike Ashley)
- "Another Interview with Neil Gaiman" (Darrell Schweitzer)
- "Neil Gaiman: An Incomplete Bibliography" (Davey Snyder)
