= The Shattered Goddess =

1983 fantasy novel by Darrell Schweitzer

- Cover of first edition
- Author: Darrell Schweitzer
- Illustrator: Stephen Fabian
- Cover artist: Stephen Fabian
- Language: English
- Genre: Fantasy
- Publisher: Starblaze/The Donning Company
- Publication date: 1983
- Publication place: United States
- Media type: Print (paperback)
- Pages: 183
- ISBN: 0-89865-197-2
- OCLC: 08347021
- Dewey Decimal: 813.54
- LC Class: PS3569.C5684 S5 1982
- Preceded by: Echoes of the Goddess

The Shattered Goddess is a fantasy novel by American writer Darrell Schweitzer, illustrated by Stephen Fabian.

== Publication history ==
It was first published in trade paperback by Starblaze/The Donning Company in March 1983, with later trade paperback editions following from Starmont House (1988), Borgo Press (1989) and Wildside Press (1999). The first hardcover edition was issued by Starmont House in 1988, followed by the Science Fiction Book Club in 2000. The first ebook edition was issued by Wildside Press in June 2015. The first British edition was published in paperback by New English Library in March 1996. It has been translated into Italian and French.

== Summary ==
The story explores the fate of a magic-ridden far future Earth at the end of an age of chaotic miracles between the death of the world's latest divinity, the Goddess, and the birth of a new one, chronicling the struggle over the nature the next deity will take and thus that of the world itself.

The immense corpse of the Goddess is preserved as a relic beneath the sacred city of Ai Hanlo, presided over by its saintly ruler Tharanodeth, guardian of the Goddess's bones. Unknown to him, a malevolent witch has designs on his city and the holiness it guards. Feigning death, she sacrifices her eyes to a demon for power in a complex scheme that allows her soul to possess Tharanodeth's infant son Kaemen. The soul is delivered by a similcrum child created around the eyes, which is then abandoned in the Kaemen's nursery as a foundling.

The court wizard Hadel, suspecting the foundling a threat, advises doing away with him, but Tharanodeth intervenes, protecting him and naming him Ginna. Kaemen and Ginna both grow up in the palace, the former, under the witch's spell, becoming willful, cruel and selfish, while the latter is a blank slate whose passive innocence leads Tharanodeth to prefer him to his own son.

When the boys are twelve, Tharanodeth dies, and Kaemen takes his place as ruler. Ginna continues to live a neglected existence in the palace, taught by Hadel and befriended by a young girl. After three years the boy and girl flee Ai Hanlo and Kaemen's increasingly capricious tyranny, which is ushering in an apocalypse of blood and darkness. They fall in with a merchant caravan and later a ship crewed by mystical warriors as the darkness spreading from the city taints and changes the world, engulfing humanity and awakening long-buried monsters and horrors.

Ginna gains knowledge and some power during his journey, but despairs of making a difference. He reaches the goal of his quest, an otherworldly grove of light watched over by the spirit of the Goddess's mother, and learns the secret of the horror overtaking the world and his own origin and purpose. His destiny brings him into direct conflict with the doomed Kaemen and the malign vision of his witch-creator, with the outcome of the struggle to decide the fate of the world and the nature of the deity that will preside over its next phase. Will it be one of death and decay, or is some kind of redemption possible?

== Relation to other works ==
Schweitzer subsequently explored the age prior to the events of the book in a cycle of short stories collected in Echoes of the Goddess (2013), which serve as a prequel to the novel.

== Reception ==
Mary Gentle writing in Vector, assessed the book's quality as follows: "Few writers can genuinely touch the quality of nightmare. By that I don't mean the cataloguing of horror and gore that blurb-writers so often refer to as nightmare-like, but the fear that formless and almost banal stems from the sleeping mind. John Bellairs did it with The Face in the Frost ... James Blaylock can do it. And now there is also The Shattered Goddess.

W. Paul Ganley in Fantasy Mongers: "Compelling, intriguing characters, moody, haunting, persuasive . . . fierce imagery containing equal parts legend and fantasy; distinctly different."

The Encyclopedia of Fantasy (1997) noted that "[t]he novel has immense power in its climax and ... sustains the forlorn mood of loss."

The novel was also reviewed by Neal Wilgus in Thrust no. 20, Summer 1984, and Janice M. Eisen in Aboriginal Science Fiction, May–June 1989.
