= The Robert E. Howard Reader =

- The Robert E. Howard Reader edited by Darrell Schweitzer, Wildside Press, 2010
- Author: Darrell Schweitzer (editor)
- Cover artist: Mark Stout
- Language: English
- Genre: Essays
- Publisher: Wildside Press
- Publication date: 2010
- Publication place: United States
- Media type: Print (Paperback)
- Pages: 212 p.
- ISBN: 978-0-8095-7167-3
- OCLC: 86167939

The Robert E. Howard Reader is a collection of essays on fantasy writer Robert E. Howard and his works, edited by Darrell Schweitzer. Originally scheduled for publication in 2007, it was ultimately published in September 2010 by Wildside Press.

== Summary ==
The book consists of seventeen essays by various authors, together with an introduction by the editor. A few of the pieces were previously published as articles in George H. Scithers's fanzine Amra, the anthologies The Conan Swordbook (1969), The Conan Grimoire (1972), and Exploring Fantasy Worlds (1985), and the magazines The New York Review of Science Fiction and Weird Tales The remainder are original to the collection.

== Contents ==
- "Introduction" (Darrell Schweitzer)
- "Robert E. Howard: A Texan Master” (Michael Moorcock)
- "The Everlasting Barbarian" (Leo Grin)
- "Robert E. Howard's Fiction" (L. Sprague de Camp)
- "The Art of Robert Ervin Howard" (Poul Anderson)
- "Howard's Style" (Fritz Leiber)
- "What He Wrote and How They Said It" (Robert Weinberg)
- "Barbarism vs. Civilization" (S.T. Joshi)
- "Crash Go the Civilizations" (Mark Hall)
- "Return to Xuthal" (Charles Hoffman)
- "Howard's Oriental Stories" (Don D'Ammassa)
- "King Kull as a Prototype of Conan" (Darrell Schweitzer)
- "How Pure a Puritan Was Solomon Kane?" (Robert M. Price)
- "Balthus of Cross Plains" (George H. Scithers)
- "Fictionalizing Howard" (Gary Romeo)
- "A Journey to Cross Plains" (Howard Waldrop)
- "Weird Tales and the Great Depression" (Scott Connors)
- "After Aquilonia and Having Left Lankhmar: Sword & Sorcery Since the 1980s” (Steve Tompkins)

== Reception ==
The book was reviewed by Paul Di Filippo in Asimov's Science Fiction, January 2012.
