= Shadows Out of Time =

Short horror stories series

- Cover of first edition, 2019
- Editor: Darrell Schweitzer
- Cover artist: Bob Eggleton
- Language: English
- Genre: Horror
- Publisher: PS Publishing, Drugstore Indian Press
- Publication date: 2023
- Publication place: United Kingdom
- Media type: Print (hardcover, trade paperback), ebook
- Pages: x, 319
- ISBN: 978-1-78636-885-0

Shadows Out of Time is an anthology of original horror short stories edited by Darrell Schweitzer. It was first published in hardcover and ebook by PS Publishing and in trade paperback by PS Publishing's paperback imprint Drugstore Indian Press in January 2023.

== Summary ==
The book collects seventeen short stories by various authors, with an introduction by the editor. All, per the editor's prompt, are inspired by the theme H. P. Lovecraft regarded as "the most potent and fruitful theme in all human expression," conflict with time. A few, such as the pieces by Guffey and Price, are spinoffs from Lovecraft's 1936 novella "The Shadow Out of Time."

== Contents ==
- "Introduction" (Darrell Schweitzer)
- "A Dream of Years" (Ann K. Schwader)
- "The Cave of the Immortals" (Don Webb)
- "The Private Estate" (James Chambers)
- "Toward a General Theory of Yithian Psychology" (Robert Guffey)
- "The Beast Comes to Brooklyn" (Gordon Linzner)
- "Just the Weight of God" (Bryan D. Dietrich)
- "Malygris Never Died" (John R. Fultz)
- "Nineteen Minutes" (Frederic S. Durbin)
- "Every Path Taken" (Nicholas Kaufmann)
- "Genghis at the Gate of Dreams" (Tim Lees)
- "Moonlight Over Mauritania" (Adrian Cole)
- "Out of Time" (Geoffrey Hart)
- "The Colour Out of Shadow" (Harry Turtledove)
- "Kingsport Tea" (Will Murray)
- "Crom-Ya’s Triumph" (Robert M. Price)
- "The Rocks of Leng" (Keith Taylor)
- "The Moth in the Dark" (Darrell Schweitzer)
