= That Is Not Dead =

Horror stories by Darrell Schweitzer

That is Not Dead: Tales of the Cthulhu Mythos Through the Centuries
- Cover of first edition, 2015
- Author: edited by Darrell Schweitzer
- Cover artist: Jason Van Hollander
- Language: English
- Genre: Horror
- Publisher: PS Publishing
- Publication date: 2015
- Publication place: United States
- Media type: Print (hardcover)
- Pages: 240 pp.
- ISBN: 978-1-848638-57-0

That is Not Dead: Tales of the Cthulhu Mythos Through the Centuries is an anthology of original horror short stories edited by Darrell Schweitzer. It was first published in hardcover by PS Publishing in February 2015. It shares a title with That is Not Dead: The Black Magic & Occult Stories, a short story collection by August Derleth published in 2009. In both instances, the title is derived from a couplet by H. P. Lovecraft attributed to his fictional "mad poet" Abdul Alhazred: "That is not dead which can eternal lie, / And with strange aeons even death may die."

== Summary ==
The book collects fourteen short stories by various authors, with an introduction by the editor. All share the Cthulhu Mythos setting originated by H. P. Lovecraft, but unlike his stories, which generally take place in modern times, they are set in previous historical eras. The effect is to take the Mythos from the realm of contemporary horror into that of historical fiction. The stories are presented in chronological order from the 2nd millennium BC to the late 19th century, with the last set in the present but looking back to medieval events.

== Contents ==
- "Introduction: Horror of the Carnivàle" (Darrell Schweitzer)
- "Egypt, 1200 BC: Herald of Chaos" (Keith Taylor)
- "Mesopotamia, second millennium BC: What a Girl Needs" (Esther Friesner)
- "Judaea, second century AD: The Horn of the World’s Ending" (John Langan)
- "Central Asia, second century AD: Monsters in the Mountains at the Edge of the World" (Jay Lake)
- "Palestine, Asia Minor, and Central Asia; late eleventh and mid twelfth centuries AD: Come, Follow Me" (Darrell Schweitzer)
- "England, 1605: Ophiuchus" (Don Webb)
- "Russia, late seventeenth century: Of Queens and Pawns" (Lois H. Gresh)
- "Mexico, 1753: Smoking Mirror" (Will Murray)
- "France, 1762: Incident at Ferney" (S. T. Joshi)
- "Arizona Territory, 1781: Anno Domini Azathoth" (John R. Fultz)
- "Massachusetts, USA, early twentieth century. Italy, early nineteenth century: Slowness" (Don Webb)
- "Massachusetts, USA, and Spain, late nineteenth century: The Salamanca Encounter" (Richard A. Lupoff)
- "Seattle, Washington, USA, 1889: Old Time Entombed" (W. H. Pugmire)
- "England, twenty-first century and the Middle Ages: Nine Drowned Churches" (Harry Turtledove)

== Reception ==
The anthology was reviewed by Peter Tennant in Black Static, May-June 2015.
