= The Thomas Ligotti Reader =

- The Thomas Ligotti Reader edited by Darrell Schweitzer, Wildside Press, 2003
- Author: Darrell Schweitzer (editor)
- Language: English
- Genre: Essays
- Publisher: Wildside Press
- Publication date: 2003
- Publication place: United States
- Media type: Print (Paperback)
- Pages: 188
- ISBN: 1-59224-130-1
- OCLC: 52763989

The Thomas Ligotti Reader: Essays and Explorations is a collection of essays on American horror writer Thomas Ligotti and his works, edited by Darrell Schweitzer. It was first published in trade paperback in April 2003 by Wildside Press, with a hardcover edition from the same publisher following in July of the same year.

The book consists of thirteen essays by various authors, including one by Ligotti himself, together with a bibliography of Ligotti's published works.

== Contents ==
- "Thomas Ligotti's Career of Nightmares" (Matt Cardin)
- "Weird Tales Talks with Thomas Ligotti" (Darrell Schweitzer)
- "The Mystagogue, the Gnostic Quest, the Secret Book" (Robert M. Price)
- "Nothing is What it Seems to Be" (Stefan R. Dziemianowicz)
- "Disillusionment can be Glamorous: an Interview with Thomas Ligotti" (E.M. Angerhuber and Thomas Wagner)
- "The Transition from Literary Horror to Existential Nightmare in Thomas Ligotti's 'Nethescurial'" (Matt Cardin)
- "The Dark Beauty of Unheard of Horrors" (Thomas Ligotti)
- "Liminal Terror and Collective Identity in Thomas Ligotti's 'The Shadow at the Bottom of the World'" (Matt Cardin)
- "Twilight Twilight Nihil Nihil: Thomas Ligotti and the Post-Industrial English Underground" (William Burns)
- "Soft Black Star: Some Thoughts on Knowing Thomas Ligotti" (David Tibet)
- "The Dream Quest of Thomas Ligotti: a Study of 'In a Foreign Town, in a Foreign Land'" (Ben P. Indick)
- "Ligotti's Corporate Horror" (Darrell Schweitzer)
- "Thomas Ligotti: Escape from Life" (S.T. Joshi)
- "A Thomas Ligotti Bibliography" (Douglas Anderson)
