= The Ghosts of the Heaviside Layer, and Other Fantasms =

Collection of material by Lord Dunsany

- Cover of first edition of The Ghosts of the Heaviside, Layer and Other Fantasms
- Editor: Darrell Schweitzer
- Author: Lord Dunsany
- Illustrator: Tim Kirk
- Cover artist: Tim Kirk
- Language: English
- Genre: ghost stories, essays, plays
- Publisher: Owlswick Press
- Publication date: 1980
- Publication place: United States
- Media type: Print (hardback)
- Pages: x, 354
- ISBN: 0-913896-14-4
- OCLC: 07077818
- Dewey Decimal: 828.91209 19
- LC Class: PR6007.U6 G46 1980

The Ghosts of the Heaviside Layer, and Other Fantasms is a collection of ghost stories, essays and plays by Anglo-Irish fantasy writer Lord Dunsany, edited by Darrell Schweitzer and illustrated by Tim Kirk. It was first published in hardcover by Owlswick Press in 1980.

The book collects fourteen short stories, nineteen essays and two plays by the author, including two of his Jorkens stories, with an introductory foreword by Schweitzer.

== Contents ==
- "Foreword" by Darrell Schweitzer
- Fiction
  - "The Ghosts of the Heaviside Layer" (1955)
  - "Told Under Oath" (1952)
  - "The Field Where the Satyrs Danced" (1928)
  - "By Night in the Forest" (1953)
  - "A Royal Swan" (1950)
  - "How the Lost Causes Were Removed from Valhalla" (1919)
  - "Correcting Nature" (1950)
  - "Autumn Cricket" (1950)
  - "In the Mojave" [Jorkens] (1954)
  - "The Ghost of the Valley" (1954)
  - "The Ghost in the Old Corridor" (1949)
  - "Jorkens's Problem" [Jorkens] (1949)
  - "The Revelation to Mr. Periple" (1954)
  - "A Fable for Moderns" (1951)
- Essays
  - "The Fantastic Dreams" (1949)
  - "Nowadays" (1912)
  - "Ghosts" (1938)
  - "Irish Writers I Have Known" (1953)
  - "Four Poets" (1958)
  - "The Authorship of Barrack Room Ballads" (1956)
  - "Sime" (1942)
  - "Artist and Tradesman" (1918)
  - "Spring Reaches England" (1938)
  - "Triad" (1937)
  - "July" (1944)
  - "Or But a Wandering Voice" (1937)
  - "After the Shadow" (1939)
  - "A Moment in the Life of a Dog" (1953)
  - "Seeing the World" (1950)
  - "A Word for Fallen Grandeur" (1951)
  - "Where Do You Get the Clay?" (1945)
  - "Decay in the Language" (1936)
  - "The Carving of the Ivory" (1928)
- Plays
  - "The Prince of Stamboul" (1925)
  - "Lord Adrian" (1933)
