= Cthulhu's Reign =

2010 anthology edited by Darrell Schweitzer

- Cover of first edition, 2010
- Author: edited by Darrell Schweitzer
- Language: English
- Genre: Horror short stories
- Publisher: DAW Books
- Publication date: 2010
- Publication place: United States
- Media type: Print (paperback)
- Pages: 309 pp.
- ISBN: 978-0-7564-0616-5

Cthulhu's Reign is an anthology of original horror short stories edited by Darrell Schweitzer. It was first published in paperback by DAW Books in April 2010.

== Summary ==
The book collects fifteen short stories by various authors, with an introduction by the editor. All share the Cthulhu Mythos setting originated by H. P. Lovecraft, with the twist that the dreaded revival of the fearsome "Great Old Ones" who once ruled the Earth is not a future possibility but an event that has actually come to pass, taking the Mythos from the realm of contemporary horror into that of apocalyptic and post-apocalyptic fiction.

== Contents ==
- "Introduction" (Darrell Schweitzer)
- "The Walker in the Cemetery" (Ian Watson)
- "Sanctuary" (Don Webb)
- "Her Acres of Pastoral Playground" (Mike Allen)
- "Spherical Trigonometry" (Ken Asamatsu)
- "What Brings the Void" (Will Murray)
- "The New Pauline Corpus" (Matt Cardin)
- "Ghost Dancing" (Darrell Schweitzer)
- "This is How the World Ends" (John R. Fultz)
- "The Shallows" (John Langan)
- "Such Bright and Risen Madness in Our Names" (Jay Lake)
- "The Seals of New R'lyeh" (Gregory Frost)
- "The Holocaust of Ecstasy" (Brian Stableford)
- "Vastation" (Laird Barron)
- "Nothing Personal" (Richard A. Lupoff)
- "Remnants" (Fred Chappell)

== Reception ==
The anthology was reviewed by Martin Andersson in Dead Reckonings no. 8, Fall 2010, and Chris Braak in Black Gate, Spring 2011.
