= Mountains of Madness Revealed =

2019 short story anthology

- Cover of first edition, 2019
- Editor: Darrell Schweitzer
- Cover artist: J. K. Potter
- Language: English
- Genre: Horror
- Publisher: PS Publishing
- Publication date: 2019
- Publication place: United Kingdom
- Media type: Print (hardcover)
- ISBN: 978-1-786363-74-9

Mountains of Madness Revealed is an anthology of original horror short stories edited by Darrell Schweitzer. It was first published in hardcover by PS Publishing in September 2019.

== Summary ==
The book collects nineteen short stories by various authors, with an introduction by the editor. All share the setting of the ice-buried Antarctic city of the Elder Things and shoggoths originally described by H. P. Lovecraft in his 1930 Cthulhu Mythos novella At the Mountains of Madness, which in the anthology's premise has been revealed to the modern world as horrible fact through the melting of the Antarctic ice cap by global warming.

== Contents ==
- "Introduction" (Darrell Schweitzer)
- "Climate of Fear" (Ann K. Schwader)
- "Cold Storage" (Adrian Cole)
- "Beyond the Thaw" (Gordon Linzner)
- "Echoes from the Ice" (James Chambers)
- "New Birth" (Melinda LaFevers)
- "The Embrace of Elder Things" (John R. Fultz)
- "The Hill of the Beast" (Harry Turtledove)
- "Skinny Dipping with the Old Ones" (James Van Pelt)
- "The Unspeakable Spawning of the Proto-Shoggoths" (Robert M. Price)
- "The Water of Dhul Nun" (Don Webb)
- "A Boy and His Shoggoth" (John Shirley)
- "The Yog-Sothoth Policemen’s Union" (Paul Di Filippo)
- "The Evening Calm" (Frederic S. Durbin)
- "Strange Perfumes of a Polar Sun" (John Linwood Grant)
- "At the Mountains of Magnates" (Geoffrey Hart)
- "In Everything a Sound" (Amdi Silvestri)
- "A Wind from the South" (Géza A. G. Reilly)
- "Down to a Sunless Sea" (Darrell Schweitzer)
- "The Ballad of the Black Mountain" (Adam Bolivar)
