= We Are All Legends =

1981 collection of short stories by Darrell Schweitzer

- Cover of We Are All Legends
- Author: Darrell Schweitzer
- Illustrator: Stephen Fabian
- Cover artist: Stephen Fabian
- Language: English
- Genre: Fantasy
- Publisher: The Donning Company/Starblaze Editions
- Publication date: 1981
- Publication place: United States
- Media type: Print (paperback)
- Pages: 193
- ISBN: 0-89865-062-3
- OCLC: 07271987

We Are All Legends is a collection of fantasy short stories by American writer Darrell Schweitzer featuring his sword and sorcery hero Sir Julian. The book was edited by Hank Stine and illustrated by Stephen Fabian, and features an introduction by L. Sprague de Camp. It was first published as a trade paperback by The Donning Company in 1981. It was reprinted by Starmount House in 1988, Borgo Press in 1989 and Wildside Press in 1999.

== Summary ==
The collection consists of a cycle of thirteen stories, nine of them originally published from 1976 to 1979 in various fantasy and science fiction magazines and anthologies, with the remainder original to the collection. The stories relate the endless, hopeless journey of the doomed anti-hero Sir Julian, a medieval knight whose soul is forfeit to Satan but who has been left free to wander the world. He encounters numerous horrors and divine or semi-divine creatures from myth and legend, and in the course of his adventures is continually forced into awareness of his internal and seemingly unconquerable flaws, frailties that brought about and continue to ensure his damnation.

== Contents ==
- "Introduction" (L. Sprague de Camp)
- "The Hag" (from Swords Against Darkness III, Mar. 1978)
- "The Lady of the Fountain" (from Void no. 5, Feb. 1977)
- "Island of Faces"
- "The Veiled Pool of Mistorak" (from Fantasy Crosswinds no. 2, Jan. 1977)
- "The One Who Spoke with the Owls" (from Void no. 4, May 1976)
- "The Castle of Kites and Crows" (from Swords Against Darkness V, Nov. 1979)
- "The Riddle of the Horn" (from Heroic Fantasy, Apr. 1979)
- "Divers Hands" (from The Year's Best Horror Stories: Series VII, Jul. 1979)
- "The Unknown God Cried Out"
- "Into the Dark Land" (from Alien Worlds, 1979)
- "A Fabulous, Formless Darkness" (from Ron Graham Presents Others Worlds, 1978)
- "Midnight, Moonlight, and the Secret of the Sea"
- "L'envoi"

== Reception ==
L. Sprague de Camp in his introduction to the book called the author "one of the brightest of the rising generation of fantasists," and its contents "dreamy — often nightmarish — narratives ... mood pieces, the mood of which the author achieves with deceptive ease," reminiscent of the works of "Lord Dunsany, James Branch Cabell, Michael Moorcock, and perhaps George MacDonald" that leave the reader "with the feeling that he has undergone a strange and haunting experience."

L. Cowan, writing on the collection in Mythprint, called its stories "worth sharing" and their author "a master story-teller," who "conveys his ideas with professional ease, never once confusing or cheating the reader" in a style "moody, haunting, persuasive, and smooth."

Somtow Sucharitkul in Fantasy Newsletter wrote the book "contains not a few sparks of genuine dementia, which will assuredly reward the patient reader." In his opinion Schweitzer created "a brilliantly berserk, schizoid universe ... for his characters ... contain[ing] none of the cosy cuteness of standard fantasy worlds. It's a place of metal teardrops, phantom gargoyle armies, desolation and terror, and the details ring true, as though one were reading an analyst's logbook of the nightmares of madmen." On the downside, he noted "some quirks that may render the book practically unreadable for some," with some of its contents "from a very early period in his writing career, when he's still searching for a style; and in general the book is written in an uneasy hodgepodge of modern-colloquial and uncertain, sometimes incorrect, archaisms." Sucharitkul was "not sure this book should have been published; it might have been better to wait for something more consciously controlled, more articulate." But he felt that if Schweitzer "can only learn to tame the English language . . . he has the making of a fine, original fantasist."

The collection was also reviewed Charles Platt in The Patchin Review no. 3, 1982, Greg Renault in Science Fiction & Fantasy Book Review no. 3, April 1982, Mark Mansell in Science Fiction Review, Summer 1982, Joe Sanders in Starship, November 1982, and Chris Gilmore in Interzone no. 155, May 2000.
