= The Mask of the Sorcerer =

1995 novel by Darrell Schweitzer

- Cover of first edition
- Author: Darrell Schweitzer
- Language: English
- Genre: Fantasy
- Publisher: New English Library
- Publication date: 1995
- Publication place: United States
- Media type: Print (hardcover)
- Pages: 421
- ISBN: 978-0-340-64003-6
- OCLC: 221830792
- Dewey Decimal: 813.54
- LC Class: PS3569.C5684 M37 1995b
- Followed by: Sekenre: The Book of the Sorcerer

The Mask of the Sorcerer is a fantasy novel by American writer Darrell Schweitzer.

== Publication history ==
The novel was first published in paperback in the United Kingdom by New English Library in October 1995. The first U.S. edition was published in hardcover by the Science Fiction Book Club in October 1999, with trade paperback and ebook editions following from Wildside Press in December 2003 and February 2014, respectively. The novel is an expansion of the author's 1991 novelette "To Become a Sorcerer," which was nominated for the 1992 World Fantasy Award for Best Novella.

== Summary ==
Young Sekenre lives in the marshes of the Riverland (implied to be, or at least inspired by, prehistoric Egypt) together with his sister and parents. His father Vashtem supports the family as the local magician—or so it appears. Actually, Vashtem is a sorcerer attempting both to deny his identity and hide from his enemies, and his children are pawns in his plot to cheat his dark fate when it ultimately catches up to him. There is a difference between magicians and sorcerers; the former merely channel magic, while the latter embody it, at a great price.

Things come to a head when Vashtem inexplicably murders his wife and daughter, leaving his son Sekenre to seek vengeance and understanding with the aid of a Sybil who has her own agenda. A quest through the Underworld brings son and father to their reckoning, with justice meted out to Vashtem only at the cost of Sekenre taking on his curse. In killing a sorcerer, one takes on his power and immortality, absorbing his soul and knowledge, along with those of all those previously killed by that sorcerer and his predecessors. And one takes on their enemies, as well.

Physically frozen at the age of a child, Sekenre may well live forever, if he can master his terrifying new powers, retain his sense of self and morality against the haunting spirits of his evil predecessors, and avoid being slain by foes inherited and newly gained.

== Relation to other works ==
Schweitzer subsequently explored other events in the life of Sekenre in a cycle of short stories collected in Sekenre: The Book of the Sorcerer (2004), which serve as a sequel to the novel.

== Reception ==
Don D'Ammassa rates the novel as "quite good fantasy adventure," "truly inventive and fantastical," in contrast to "[t]he latest pseudo-Medieval fantasy series." He notes that "[t]he fantasy world isn't just a copy of one of the standard ones and there is actually depth to the characters."

The novel was also reviewed by Chris Gilmore in Interzone no. 105, March 1996, and Dan'l Danehy-Oakes in The New York Review of Science Fiction, February 2005.
