= Fifty-One Tales =

Book by Lord Dunsany (1915)

- First UK edition
- Author: Lord Dunsany
- Language: English
- Genre: Fantasy
- Publisher: Elkin Mathews (UK); Mitchell Kennerly (US)
- Publication date: 1915
- Publication place: United Kingdom
- Media type: Print (hardcover)
- Preceded by: Five Plays
- Followed by: The Last Book of Wonder
- Text: Fifty-One Tales at Wikisource

Fifty-One Tales is a collection of fantasy short stories by Irish writer Lord Dunsany, considered a major influence on the work of J. R. R. Tolkien, H. P. Lovecraft, Ursula K. Le Guin and others. The first editions, in hardcover, were published simultaneously in London and New York City by Elkin Mathews and Mitchell Kennerley, respectively, in April 1915. The British and American editions differ in that they arrange the material slightly differently and that each includes a story the other omits; "The Poet Speaks with Earth" in the British version, and "The Mist" in the American version.

The collection's significance in the history of fantasy literature was recognized by its republication (as The Food of Death: Fifty-One Tales) by the Newcastle Publishing Company as the third volume of the Newcastle Forgotten Fantasy Library in September 1974. The Newcastle edition used the American version of the text.

The book collects fifty-one short stories by the author.

== Contents ==
- "The Assignation"
- "Charon"
- "The Death of Pan"
- "The Sphinx at Gizeh"
- "The Hen"
- "Wind and Fog"
- "The Raft Builders"
- "The Workman"
- "The Guest"
- "Death and Odysseus"
- "Death and the Orange"
- "The Prayer of the Flowers"
- "Time and the Tradesman"
- "The Little City"
- "The Unpasturable Fields"
- "The Worm and the Angel"
- "The Songless Country"
- "The Latest Thing"
- "The Demagogue and the Demi-Monde"
- "The Giant Poppy"
- "Roses"
- "The Man with the Golden Ear-rings"
- "The Dream of King Karna-Vootra"
- "The Storm"
- "A Mistaken Identity"
- "The True History of the Hare and the Tortoise"
- "Alone the Immortals"
- "A Moral Little Tale"
- "The Return of Song"
- "Spring in Town"
- "How the Enemy Came to Thlūnrāna"
- "A Losing Game"
- "Taking Up Piccadilly"
- "After the Fire"
- "The City"
- "The Food of Death"
- "The Lonely Idol"
- "The Sphinx in Thebes (Massachusetts)"
- "The Reward"
- "The Trouble in Leafy Green Street"
- "Furrow-Maker"
- "Lobster Salad"
- "The Return of the Exiles"
- "Nature and Time"
- "The Song of the Blackbird"
- "The Messengers"
- "The Three Tall Sons"
- "Compromise"
- "What We Have Come To"
- "The Tomb of Pan"
- "The Poet Speaks With Earth" (English version only)
- "The Mist" (American version only)
