= Sekenre: The Book of the Sorcerer =

2004 collection of fantasy short stories by Darrell Schweitzer

- Author: Darrell Schweitzer
- Illustrator: Stephen Fabian
- Cover artist: Stephen Fabian
- Language: English
- Genre: Fantasy
- Publisher: Wildside Press
- Publication date: 2004
- Publication place: United States
- Media type: Print (paperback)
- Pages: 239
- ISBN: 978-0-8095-1078-8
- OCLC: 60348078
- Preceded by: The Mask of the Sorcerer

Sekenre: The Book of the Sorcerer is a collection of fantasy short stories by American writer Darrell Schweitzer featuring his dark fantasy protagonist, the child sorcerer Sekenre, a sequel to the novel The Mask of the Sorcerer (1995). The book was illustrated by Stephen Fabian. It was first published as a trade paperback by Wildside Press in 2004.

== Summary ==
The collection consists of twelve stories of Sekenre, originally published from 1994 to 2004 in a number of fantasy fiction magazines. The stories relate various episodes in the life of the immortal sorcerer Sekenre, who stopped aging physically when he first became a sorcerer when still a child, as he confronts various threats and challenges while attempting to maintain some semblance of humanity down the ages.

== Contents ==
- "On the Last Night of the Festival of the Dead" (from Interzone no. 90, Dec. 1994)
- "The Sorcerer's Gift" (from Worlds of Fantasy & Horror, Win. 1996–7)
- "King Father Stone" (from Interzone no. 103, Jan. 1996)
- "The Giant Vorviades" (from Interzone no. 99, Sep. 1995)
- "The Silence of Kings" (from Weirdbook no. 30, Spr. 1997)
- "Vandibar Nasha in the College of Shadows" (from Adventures of Sword and Sorcery no. 7, Sep. 2000)
- "In the Street of the Witches" (from Weird Tales v. 56, no. 4, Sum. 2000)
- "The Lantern of the Supreme Moment" (from Space and Time no. 93, Spr. 2001)
- "From Out of the Crocodile's Mouth" (from Weird Tales v. 58, no. 1, Fall 2001)
- "Dreams of the Stone King's Daughter" (from Weird Tales v. 59, no. 2, Win. 2002)
- "Seeking the Gifts of the Queen of Vengeance" (from Odyssey, iss. 2, 1998)
- "Lord Abernaeven's Tale" (from Weird Tales v. 60, no. 2, Jan.-Feb. 2004)

== Reception ==
Don D'Ammassa calls Schweitzer's stories "some of the more interesting sword and sorcery style fantasy fiction being published these past few years," and Sekenre "probably Schweitzer's most interesting character, a combination of a child and a powerful sorcerer who has almost ceased to be a human being." He finds "[t]he quality [of the collection] very consistent so it's hard to single out individual stories, but I'd pick 'On the Last Night of the Festival of the Dead' and 'The Lantern of the Supreme Moment' as the two I enjoyed the most."
