= Quicker Than the Eye =

1996 collection of short stories by Ray Bradbury

- dust-jacket from the first edition
- Author: Ray Bradbury
- Cover artist: Bernie Fuchs
- Language: English
- Genre: Fantasy, science fiction
- Publisher: Avon Books
- Publication date: 1996
- Publication place: United States
- Media type: Print (hardback)
- Pages: 262 pp
- ISBN: 0-380-97380-4
- OCLC: 34699566
- Dewey Decimal: 813/.54 20
- LC Class: PS3503.R167 Q53 1996

Quicker Than the Eye (ISBN 0-380-97380-4, 1996 Avon Books) is a collection of short stories by American writer Ray Bradbury.

== Background ==
The anthology features 21 stories that had not yet appeared in book form. Quicker Than the Eye features a mix of 11 old and 10 new stories.

== Contents ==
- "Unterderseaboat Doktor", which features, as a psychiatrist, a former submarine captain in Hitler's undersea fleet, making connections between sub-marine and sub-conscious.
- "Zaharoff/Richter Mark V", a speculation on why so many major cities are in such dangerous locales.
- "Remember Sascha?"
- "Another Fine Mess", a homage to Laurel and Hardy; a sequel to "The Laurel and Hardy Love Affair".
- "The Electrocution"
- "Hopscotch"
- "The Finnegan", a tall tale in a Victorian mood.
- "That Woman on the Lawn, a tangential episode in the same "universe" as Something Wicked This Way Comes
- "The Very Gentle Murders", a fantasy of marital strife
- "Quicker Than the Eye", which visits another carnival act.
- "Dorian In Excelsis", which pays homage to Oscar Wilde's The Picture of Dorian Gray
- "No News, Or What Killed the Dog?"
- "The Witch Door"
- "The Ghost in the Machine"
- "At the End Of the Ninth Year"
- "Bug"
- "Once More, Legato"
- "Exchange"
- "Free Dirt"
- "Last Rites"
- "The Other Highway"
- "Make Haste To Live: An Afterword", in which the author writes of writing and the back-stories of some of the stories in this collection.
