= The Man Who Ate the Phoenix =

Book by Lord Dunsany (1949)

- First edition
- Author: Lord Dunsany
- Language: English
- Genre: Fantasy
- Publisher: Jarrolds
- Publication date: 1949
- Publication place: United Kingdom
- Media type: Print (hardcover)

The Man Who Ate the Phoenix is a collection of fantasy short stories by Anglo-Irish writer Lord Dunsany. The first edition was published in London by Jarrolds in December 1949.

The book collects 41 short pieces by Dunsany.

== Contents ==
- "The Man Who Ate the Phoenix"
- "The Widow Flynn's Apple Tree"
- "Where Everyone's Business is Known"
- "The Rose By-pass"
- "An Old Man's Tale"
- "How the Tinker Came to Skavangur"
- "The Opal Arrow-Head"
- "The Sultan's Pet"
- "The Descent of the Sultan of Khash"
- "The Policeman's Prophecy"
- "The Wind in the Wood"
- "The Tiger's Skin"
- "The Finding of Mr. Jupkens"
- "The Awful Dream"
- "Mrs. Mulger"
- "The Choice"
- "Rose Tibbets"
- "Little Snow White Up to Date"
- "The Return"
- "The Mad Ghost"
- "The Cause"
- "The Cut"
- "The Sleuthing of Lily Bostum"
- "The Possibility of Life on the Third Planet"
- "Old Emma"
- "How Abdul Din Saved Justice"
- "The First Watch-Dog"
- "The Chess-Player, the Financier, and Another"
- "The Honorary Member"
- "The Experiment"
- "Down among the Kingcups"
- "The Gratitude of the Devil"
- "The After-Dinner Speech"
- "The Je-ne-sais-quoi"
- "Poseidon"
- "A Near Thing"
- "Ardor Canis"
- "A Lapse of Memory"
- "Forty Years On"
- "The Iron Door"
- "The Great Scoop"
