= Living with the Dead (The Tale of Old Corpsenberg) =

2008 collection of linked short stories by Darrell Schweitzer

Living With the Dead (The Tale of Old Corpsenberg)
- Cover of Living With the Dead (The Tale of Old Corpsenberg)
- Author: Darrell Schweitzer
- Illustrator: Jason Van Hollander
- Cover artist: Jason Van Hollander
- Language: English
- Genre: Fantasy short stories
- Publisher: PS Publishing
- Publication date: 2008
- Publication place: United States
- Media type: Print (paperback)
- Pages: vii, 62 pp
- ISBN: 978-1-905834-69-3
- OCLC: 460232223

Living With the Dead (The Tale of Old Corpsenberg) is a collection of linked fantasy short stories written by Darrell Schweitzer. It was first published in hardcover by PS Publishing in September 2008.

== Summary ==
The collection consists of five stories, three originally published in 2003 and 2004 in Interzone and two first published in the collection, together with an introduction by Tim Lebbon. The stories take place in the coastal town of Old Corpsenberg, on the wharfs of which heaps of dead bodies periodically appear overnight. These, by long custom, the residents are required to take into their homes and treat as guests. While the "guests" do not decompose, over time conditions become more and more crowded as room is made for them. Each tale follows a living member of the community dealing with the increasingly difficult situation. Among the characters are an official who finds among the dead the most beautiful woman in the world, a schoolteacher attempting to keep order in a classroom crowded with corpses, and a young student oppressed by the status quo.

== Contents ==
- "Introduction" (Tim Lebbon)
- "The Most Beautiful Dead Woman in the World" (from Interzone no. 189, May/Jun. 2003)
- "They Are Still Dancing" (from Interzone no. 192, Nov./Dec. 2003)
- "The Order of Things Must Be Preserved" (from Interzone no. 193, Spr. 2004)
- "The Boy Who Dreamed of Nothing At All"
- "The Observatory Committee"

== Reception ==
The collection was reviewed by Peter Tennant in Black Static, Dec. 2008/Jan. 2009, S. W. Theaker in Theaker's Quarterly Fiction no. 26, 2008, and S. T. Joshi in Dead Reckonings no. 5, Spring 2009.
