= The Dragon House =

2018 novel by Darrell Schweitzer

- Cover of first edition
- Author: Darrell Schweitzer
- Language: English
- Genre: Fantasy
- Publisher: Wildside Press
- Publication date: 2018
- Publication place: United States
- Media type: Print (hardcover and paperback), ebook
- Pages: 166
- ISBN: 978-1-4794-3821-1
- OCLC: 1035397063

The Dragon House is a contemporary fantasy novel by American writer Darrell Schweitzer. It was first published in hardcover and trade paperback by Wildside Press in April 2018, with an ebook edition following from the same publisher in January 2019.

== Summary ==
Edward Longstretch is a normal boy who has a normal sister, a normal mother, and a father whose mysterious job requires the family to suddenly pull up stakes and move out to an odd house in the country. He soon discovers that nothing is really as normal as he thinks it is, the new house least of all. How is that he has a weird affinity for the place, can communicate with it, and even swim through its walls? Why are there strange occult books in its library, living gargoyles on its cornices, and cannons in its belfrey?

Edward is barely introduced to the house's many secrets and his new teachers, Dr. Basileus and the partly robotic Zarcon of the planet Zarconax when the place comes under attack by Ghastly Horrors. Then sister Margaret, seeking a better internet connection, opens a window and accidentally lets them in. After that things start happening really fast, with the adults out of commission and the children in the clutches of the sadistic Mrs. Morgentod, and the fate of the entire universe in the balance.

If Edward would not be able to awake the Dragon that is the house and become the hero needed through his connection with it, the undead Skeleton Dragon and its sinister Avatar will corrupt and consume all he holds dear.

== Reception ==
Author Michael Swanwick writes of the work "This is the house I should have grown up in! Schweitzer's fantasy is cleanly written, original, and great fun to read."

The novel was reviewed by Hank Wagner in Dead Reckonings no. 24, Fall 2018.
