= Echoes of the Goddess =

2013 collection of fantasy short stories by Darrell Schweitzer

Echoes of the Goddess: Tales of Terror and Wonder From the End of Time
- Cover of first edition
- Author: Darrell Schweitzer
- Illustrator: Stephen Fabian
- Cover artist: Stephen Fabian
- Language: English
- Genre: Fantasy
- Publisher: Wildside Press
- Publication date: 2013
- Publication place: United States
- Media type: Print (paperback)
- Pages: 272
- ISBN: 978-1-4794-0023-2
- OCLC: 830524360
- Followed by: The Shattered Goddess

Echoes of the Goddess: Tales of Terror and Wonder From the End of Time is a collection of fantasy short stories by American writer Darrell Schweitzer, a prequel to his novel The Shattered Goddess (1983). The book is illustrated with a cover and frontispiece by Stephen Fabian. It was first published as a trade paperback by Wildside Press in February 2013.

== Summary ==
The collection consists of a cycle of eleven stories originally published from 1982-1991 in various fantasy and science fiction magazines, together with a prologue original to the collection. Some of the stories were revised for book publication. The stories follow the fortunes of various characters living on a magic-ridden far future Earth in the age of chaotic miracles between the death of the world's latest divinity, the Goddess, and the birth of a new one. Among the protagonists are a wizard's shadow striving to become human, two fratricidal brother sorcerers engaged in a feud lasting centuries, a musician who becomes lord of death, a visionary boy priest, and a witch in love with a god.

== Contents ==
- "Prologue"
- "The Stones Would Weep" (from Fantasy Tales v. 6, no. 12, Win. 1983)
- "The Story of a Dadar" (from Amazing Science Fiction Stories v. 56, no. 1, Jun. 1982)
- "The Diminishing Man" (from Fantasy Book, v. 3, no. 3-4, Sep.-Dec. 1984)
- "A Lantern Maker of Ai Hanlo" (from Amazing Stories v. 58, no. 2, Jul. 1984)
- "Holy Fire" (from Weirdbook 17, 1983)
- "The Stolen Heart" (from Weirdbook 26, Aut. 1991)
- "Immortal Bells" (from Weirdbook 18, 1983)
- "Between Night and Morning" (from Weirdbook 20, Spr. 1985)
- "The Shaper of Animals" (from Amazing Stories v. 62, no. 2, Jul. 1987)
- "Three Brothers" (from Weirdbook 23/24, 1988)
- "Coming of Age in the City of the Goddess" (from Fantasy Book v. 4, no. 2, Jun. 1985)

== Reception ==
The collection was reviewed by John R. Fultz at blackgate.com, Feb. 20, 2013, and Richard A. Lupoff in Locus no. 629, June 2013.
