= Tales from the Miskatonic University Library =

- Cover of first edition, 2017
- Editors: Darrell Schweitzer and John Ashmead
- Cover artist: J. K. Potter
- Language: English
- Genre: Horror
- Publisher: PS Publishing
- Publication date: 2017
- Publication place: United Kingdom
- Media type: Print (hardcover)
- Pages: 219 pp.
- ISBN: 978-1-78636-028-1

Tales from the Miskatonic University Library is an anthology of original horror short stories edited by Darrell Schweitzer and John Ashmead. It was first published in hardcover and ebook editions by PS Publishing in February 2017.

== Summary ==
The book collects thirteen short stories by various authors, with introductions by the editors. All share the setting of Miskatonic University, a locale from the Cthulhu Mythos originated by H. P. Lovecraft.

== Contents ==
- "Introduction" (John Ashmead)
- "Another Introduction" (Darrell Schweitzer)
- "Slowly Ticking Time Bomb" (Don Webb)
- "The Third Movement" (Adrian Cole)
- "To Be in Ulthar on a Summer Afternoon" (Dirk Flinthart)
- "Interlibrary Loan" (Harry Turtledove)
- "A Trillion Young" (Will Murray)
- "The Paradox Collection" (A. C. Wise)
- "The Way to a Man's Heart" (Marilyn 'Mattie' Brahen)
- "The White Door" (Douglas Wynne)
- "One Small Change" (P. D. Cacek)
- "Recall Notice" (Alex Shvartsman)
- "The Children's Collection" (James Van Pelt)
- "Not in the Card Catalog" (Darrell Schweitzer)
- "The Bonfire of the Blasphemies" (Robert M. Price)
