= The Last Book of Wonder =

Book of short stories by Lord Dunsany (1916)

- First US edition
- Author: Lord Dunsany
- Original title: Tales of Wonder
- Language: English
- Genre: Fantasy
- Publisher: Elkin Mathews (UK); John W. Luce (US)
- Publication date: 1916
- Publication place: United Kingdom
- Media type: Print (hardcover)
- Preceded by: Fifty-One Tales
- Followed by: Plays of Gods and Men

The Last Book of Wonder, originally published as Tales of Wonder, is the tenth book and sixth original short story collection of Irish fantasy writer Lord Dunsany, considered a major influence on the work of J. R. R. Tolkien, H. P. Lovecraft, Ursula K. Le Guin and others.

== Editions and title variants ==
The first edition, in hardcover, was published in London by Elkin Mathews in October 1916 as Tales of Wonder, followed by a Boston hardcover publication in November, by John W. Luce & Co. The title of the American edition, The Last Book of Wonder, was Dunsany's own preferred title. The British and American editions also differ in that they arrange the material slightly differently.

The book collects nineteen short stories by the author.

== Contents ==
- "Preface"
- "A Tale of London"
- "Thirteen at Table"
- "The City on Mallington Moor"
- "Why the Milkman Shudders When He Perceives the Dawn" (also published in a chapbook)
- "The Bad Old Woman in Black"
- "The Bird of the Difficult Eye"
- "The Long Porter's Tale"
- "The Loot of Loma"
- "The Secret of the Sea"
- "How Ali Came to the Black Country"
- "The Bureau d'Echange de Maux"
- "A Story of Land and Sea"
- "A Tale of the Equator"
- "A Narrow Escape"
- "The Watch-Tower"
- "How Plash-Goo Came to the Land of None's Desire"
- "The Three Sailors' Gambit"
- "The Exiles' Club"
- "The Three Infernal Jokes"
