= Marion Zimmer Bradley's Fantasy Magazine =

American fantasy magazine

Cover of Vol. 2, issue #1

Marion Zimmer Bradley's Fantasy Magazine was a quarterly fantasy magazine founded and initially edited by American writer Marion Zimmer Bradley. Fifty issues appeared from summer 1988 through December 2000. It was published by MZB Enterprises from 1988–1989, Marion Zimmer Bradley Ltd. from 1990–1993, and the Marion Zimmer Bradley Living Trust from 1994–2000, all based in Berkeley, California. The Trust continued publication for a short time after Bradley's death in 1999; the magazine went out of business at the end of 2000.

The magazine featured short, often humorous stories, mostly written by female writers. Interviews with distinguished fantasy authors also appeared in the magazine.

== Editors ==
- Marion Zimmer Bradley, nos. 1-45, summer 1988-fall 1999
- Rachel E. Holmen, January 2000-December 2000

== Related anthologies ==
- The Best of Marion Zimmer Bradley's Fantasy Magazine (1994)
- The Best of Marion Zimmer Bradley's Fantasy Magazine — Vol. II (1995)
