= Borgo Press =

American publishing company (1975–1999)

- Status: Defunct
- Founded: 1975
- Founder: Robert Reginald
- Defunct: 1999
- Country of origin: United States
- Headquarters location: San Bernardino, California
- Fiction genres: Fiction, non-fiction

The Borgo Press was a small publishing company founded by Robert Reginald in 1975 funded by the royalties gained from his first major reference work, Stella Nova: the contemporary science fiction authors (1970).

That same year Reginald met Mary Wickizer Rogers, a student at Cal State. They married the following year and together formed the backbone of the publishing company into the 1990s.

Borgo Press specialized in literature and history, reflecting the interests of its owners. It published 300 titles from 1976 to 1998. In 2003 it started up again as an imprint of Wildside Press (Rockville, Maryland; John Gregory Betancourt, publisher), where Reginald has managed the imprint since 2006.

== Book series ==
- Bibliographies of Modern Authors ("The Work of" series)
- Borgo Bioviews
- Borgo Literary Guides
- Classics of Fantastic Literature
- Clipper Studies in the American Theatre
- Essays on Fantastic Literature
- Files Series
- I. O. Evans Studies in the Philosophy and Criticism of Literature
- Milford Series: Popular Writers of Today
- The Woodstock Series: Popular Music of Today
