= Stephen Fabian =

American illustrator (1930–2025)

- Born: Stephen Emil Fabian; January 3, 1930; Garfield, New Jersey, U.S.
- Died: May 6, 2025 (aged 95); Rome, New York, U.S.
- Occupation: Artist
- Known for: Illustration
- Awards: World Fantasy Award for Life Achievement

Stephen Emil Fabian Sr. (January 3, 1930 – May 6, 2025) was an American fantasy and science-fiction artist who only became a professional artist at the age of 44 after losing his job. Despite being a self-taught artist, he became a widely known illustrator in the science-fiction and fantasy market, and was given a World Fantasy Award for Lifetime Achievement in 2006 at the age of 76.

== Early life ==
Stephen Fabian was born January 3, 1930, in Garfield, New Jersey, the son of Andrew and Anna Hrina Fabian, both of Czech descent. When he was young, his father, an industrial laborer, moved his family to nearby Passaic, New Jersey. When Stephen was restless, his mother kept him amused by drawing sketches. Although Stephen was not excited by school and did the minimum amount of work to earn passing grades, he did show interest in technical courses and mathematics.

== Air Force ==
Fabian graduated from high school in 1948 and immediately got a job at a factory loading trailers. He quickly decided this was not going to be his career, and quit after a week. His family lacked the funds to send him to college, so he joined the United States Air Force. Although Fabian had not applied himself in high school, he now realized education was the key to his career, and took advantage of the free education offered by the Air Force, taking courses in radio and radar, where he got top grades. He subsequently took a course in instruction, and then became a teacher of those courses.

It was during this time that Fabian became interested in science fiction after reading The Ship of Ishtar novel by A. Merritt in the March 1948 issue of Fantastic Novels. Although he enjoyed the story, he was even more fascinated by the illustrations by Virgil Finlay. He became a dedicated reader of Astounding Science Fiction, as much for the illustrations as for the stories. Fabian read how-to books by illustrator and art instructor Andrew Loomis and began sketching in his spare time. He gradually taught himself to draw in the manner of Finlay, Hannes Bok, Hal Foster, Alex Raymond and Milt Caniff.

Fabian left the Air Force in 1952, and later looked back on those four years as one of the most constructive and pleasant periods of his life.

== Industry ==
Fabian found a position in the DuMont Laboratories' testing department as a lab technician. He quickly grew restless because he felt he was capable of more but Dumont would not promote him due to his lack of a college degree.

In 1955, Fabian married Dorothy Hriczov, and they raised two children, Stephen Jr., and Andrew.

In 1957, Dumont was taken over and shut down by Fairchild Industries, and Fabian was given two-weeks' notice. He immediately found a position at aircraft component manufacturer Curtiss-Wright as a tester, eventually being promoted to foreman. When that company folded in 1963, Fabian had no trouble getting a job at electronics manufacturer Simmonds Precision Products, an aircraft instrumentation company in Tarrytown, New York.

In 1965, Simmonds moved its New York operation, consolidating it with its Middlebury, Vermont, location. Fabian agreed to move his family there when offered a promotion to associate engineer.

== Artist ==
November 1974 issue of Galaxy featuring Stephen Fabian's first professional magazine cover: "Love Conquers All" (accompanying Fred Saberhagen's short story)

Shortly after his move to Vermont, in 1966, Cory Panshin sent Fabian a copy of Twilight Zine published by MIT's science-fiction group. Fabian submitted a drawing to them which was published. Other zine editors immediately asked for artwork from this new and unknown artist, and Fabian responded by creating drawings for them. He became well-known in the science-fiction zine market, having work published in Mike Glicksohn's Energuman, Outworlds, Chacal, Cross Plains, Richard Geis's Science Fiction Review, Eternity, and Tom Reamy's Trumpet. Although most of Fabian's contributions were unpaid, some of the zines paid for his artwork and returned his original. In 1970 and 1971, Fabian was a finalist for the Hugo Award for Best Fan Artist.

In 1974, Simmonds laid off Fabian and at age 44, he found himself at a crossroads: Was he likely to get another job in his field at his age, or could he make a living from art? He decided to try cracking the semi-professional and professional science-fiction magazines, and started working on art eight hours a day. He immediately sold a cover to Gerald Page for Page's fiction magazine Witchcraft & Sorcery. Other paid work soon followed, including hardcover art for a reprint of Robert E. Howard's The Vultures, a commission from Sol Cohen for a cover for Amazing Stories to accompany the novella Under the Mad Sun by Ted White, and an illustration in Galaxy magazine to accompany Ursula K. Le Guin's The Day Before the Revolution. After a year, Fabian decided he could make enough money to support his family, and moved back to Wayne, New Jersey, so he and his wife could be closer to their families.

His skill was immediately recognized by the industry, making him a finalist for the Hugo Award for Best Professional Artist for seven consecutive years (1975–1981). Fabian went on to specialize in science-fiction and fantasy illustration and cover art for books and magazines. Fabian also produced artwork for TSR's Dungeons & Dragons from 1986 to 1995, particularly on the Ravenloft line. Fabian also became a popular artist for paperback book covers, working for Pyramid, Avon, Dell, and Zebra, among others.

Fabian also published several collections of his works, including Fantastic Nudes (1976), Fantasy by Fabian (1978), More Fantasy by Fabian (1979), The Howard Collection (1979), Crystal of a Hundred Dreams (1979), Ladies & Legends (1993), and Stephen E. Fabian's Women & Wonders (1995).

In 2006, Fabian was awarded the World Fantasy Award for Life Achievement.

In a 1978 interview, Fabian confessed that he preferred working for amateur magazines and zines, since they usually paid more per piece, and they also often returned his originals, which he could then sell. But he admitted that he needed to work for the larger professional magazines (prozines), saying, "The prozines reach many thousands of people, probably 10 to 30 times as many as the small press products, so that in terms of longevity it is probably more important for me to count on the prozines to help perpetrate my professional art career. It seems logical to assume that if I can please the larger number of people I should receive the greater benefit."

== Death ==
Fabian died in Rome, New York on May 6, 2025, at the age of 95.

== Reception ==
Sam Moskovitz wrote, "In every sense of the words, Stephen Fabian is a self-made artist, fashioning himself into a specialist of most pleasing quality with wide appeal to the appreciative of the aesthetic in the art of illustration."

== Awards ==
- 1970 & 1971 Hugo Awards: Finalist for Best Fan Artist
- 1975–1981 Hugo Awards: Finalist for Best Professional Artist
- 2006 World Fantasy Award for Life Achievement

== Works ==
=== Roleplaying games ===
- Van Richten's Guide to Ghosts (1992)
