= Jason Van Hollander =

American illustrator (born 1949)

- Born: September 9, 1949 (age 76); Philadelphia, Pennsylvania
- Awards: World Fantasy Award (2000, 2004); IHG Award (2003)

Jason Van Hollander (born September 9, 1949) is an American illustrator, book designer and occasional author. His stories and collaborations with Darrell Schweitzer earned a World Fantasy Award nomination. Van Hollander's fiction and nonfiction have appeared in Weird Tales, Interzone, The Magazine of Fantasy & Science Fiction, The New York Review of Science Fiction and other publications.

Van Hollander has created morbid and grotesque artwork which adorns dust jackets of books published by Arkham House, Golden Gryphon Press, PS Publishing, Subterranean Press, Cemetery Dance Publications, Tor Books, Night Shade Books and Ash-Tree Press. He has illustrated books and stories by Thomas Ligotti, Joan Aiken, Gregory Frost, John Clute, Gerald Kersh, Fritz Leiber, Matthew Hughes, Ramsey Campbell, William Hope Hodgson, Clark Ashton Smith, Richard L. Tierney, and Matt Cardin. His media include ink and watercolor, which he has sometimes augmented on the computer.

He is listed in the 2009 edition of Science Fiction And Fantasy Artists Of The Twentieth Century: A Biographical Dictionary edited by Robert Weinberg, Jane Frank. His essay "The Digital Moment: Digital Politics" was published in Paint or Pixel: The Digital Divide in Illustration Art edited by Jane Frank (Nonestop Press, 2007).

== Personal history ==
Born in the Overbrook Park area of Philadelphia, Pennsylvania, Van Hollander attended the Philadelphia College of Art, where in 1971 he received his BA in graphic design. He has worked as an employed graphic designer in addition to his freelance art work. Circa 1979 he married Terry, a fellow artist and teacher.

== Awards and honors ==
Van Hollander has twice been awarded the World Fantasy Award for best artist, in 2000 and again in 2004, the second a shared win with Donato Giancola. He was also nominated in 2000 in the award's Collection category for Necromancies and Netherworlds: Uncanny Stories, co-written with Darrell Schweitzer.

He finally won the International Horror Guild Award for Art in 2003, having been nominated both of the previous two years. In 2005 Van Hollander received an award recommendation from The British Fantasy Society.
