= Darrell Schweitzer =

American writer, editor, and critic (born 1952)

- Schweitzer at the World Fantasy Convention, 2026
- Born: August 27, 1952 (age 74); Woodbury, New Jersey, U.S.
- Education: Villanova University (BS, MA)
- Occupations: Writer; editor; essayist
- Writing career
- Period: 1968–present
- Genre: Speculative fiction
- Notable work: The Mask of the Sorcerer

Darrell Charles Schweitzer (born August 27, 1952) is an American writer, editor, and critic in the field of speculative fiction. Much of his focus has been on dark fantasy and horror, although he does also work in science fiction and fantasy. Schweitzer is also a prolific writer of literary criticism and editor of collections of essays on various writers within his preferred genres.

== Life and career ==
Schweitzer was born in Woodbury, New Jersey, son of Francis Edward and Mary Alice Schweitzer. He attended Villanova University from 1970 to 1976, from which he received a B.S. in geography (1974) and an M.A. in English (1976). He started his literary career as a reviewer and columnist. He worked as an editorial assistant for Isaac Asimov's SF Magazine from 1977 to 1982 and Amazing Stories from 1982 to 1986, was co-editor with George H. Scithers and John Gregory Betancourt of Weird Tales from 1987 to 1990 and sole editor of the same magazine from 1991 to 1994 and its successor, Worlds of Fantasy & Horror, from 1994 to 1996. From 1998 to 2007 he was again co-editor of the revived Weird Tales, first with Scithers and then with Scithers and Betancourt. He has also been a part-time literary agent for the Owlswick Agency in Philadelphia. and a World Fantasy Award judge. He is a member of Science Fiction Writers of America and Horror Writers of America.

== Fiction ==
Most of Schweitzer's fiction is in the areas of dark fantasy and horror. He works most frequently in fiction of shorter lengths, though he has also written a number of novels. His first, The White Isle, an epic, disillusioning quest to the underworld, was written in 1976 but remained unpublished until 1989. The Shattered Goddess (1982) takes place in a far future "Dying Earth" setting, which he later revisited for a sequence of short stories collected as Echoes of the Goddess (2013).

The first work in his tales of the world of the Great River focusing on child-sorcerer Sekenre, "To Become a Sorcerer" (1991), was nominated for the 1992 World Fantasy Award for Best Novella and later expanded into the novel The Mask of the Sorcerer (1995). Additional stories in the series have been collected in Sekenre: The Book of the Sorcerer (2004).

His latest novel, The Dragon House (2018), melds his customary dark tone with elements of humor in a lighter work for young adults. Other works include his stories of the lapsed knight Julian, collected in We Are All Legends (1981), his tales of legendary madman Tom O'Bedlam, numerous works using H. P. Lovecraft's Cthulhu Mythos, many collected in Awaiting Strange Gods: Weird and Lovecraftian Fictions (2015), and a large body of unconnected short stories.

== Nonfiction ==
Schweitzer is an authority on the history of speculative fiction and has written numerous critical and bibliographical works on both the field in general and such writers as Lord Dunsany, H. P. Lovecraft, and Robert E. Howard. Many of his essays, reviews and author interviews have been collected into book form. He has also edited a number of anthologies and short story collections.

== Awards ==
Together with his editorial colleagues Schweitzer won the 1992 World Fantasy Award special award in the professional category for Weird Tales. He was also nominated twice in the collection category and once in the novella category. He was the Editor Guest of Honor at the 1997 World Horror Convention. His poem Remembering the Future won the 2006 Asimov's Science Fiction's Readers' Award for best poem. His novella Living with the Dead was nominated for the 2009 Shirley Jackson Award.
