= Richard Parks bibliography =

Bibliography of fantasy writer Richard Parks:

== Series ==
=== Yamada no Goji ===
==== Novels ====
- Yamada Monogatari: To Break the Demon Gate (2014)
- Yamada Monogatari: The War God's Son (2015)
- Yamada Monogatari: The Emperor in Shadow (2016)

==== Collections ====
- Yamada Monogatari: Demon Hunter (collection, 2013)
- Yamada Monogatari: Troubled Spirits (collection, 2022)

==== Short stories ====
- "Foxtails" (2005 – collected in Worshipping Small Gods (2007) and Yamada Monogatari: Demon Hunter (2013))
- "Moon Viewing at Shijo Bridge (2006 – collected in On the Banks of the River of Heaven (2010) and Yamada Monogatari: Demon Hunter (2013))
- "A Touch of Hell" (2007 – collected in Yamada Monogatari: Demon Hunter (2013))
- "Hot Water" (2007 – collected in Yamada Monogatari: Demon Hunter (2013))
- "The River of Three Crossings" (2009 – collected in Yamada Monogatari: Demon Hunter (2013))
- "The Mansion of Bones" (2009 – collected in Yamada Monogatari: Demon Hunter (2013))
- "Sanji's Demon" (2010 – collected in Yamada Monogatari: Demon Hunter (2013))
- "Lady of the Ghost Willow" (2010 – collected in Yamada Monogatari: Demon Hunter (2013))
- "The Ghost of Shinoda Forest" (2011 – collected in Yamada Monogatari: Demon Hunter (2013))
- "The Tiger's Turn" (2011 - collected in Yamada Monogatari: Troubled Spirits (2022))
- "Three Little Foxes" (2012 - collected in Yamada Monogatari: Troubled Spirits (2022))
- "The Bride Doll" (2013 – collected in Yamada Monogatari: Demon Hunter (2013))
- "The Sorrow of Rain" (2014 - collected in Yamada Monogatari: Troubled Spirits (2022))
- "Uzumaki of the Lake" (2020 - collected in Yamada Monogatari: Troubled Spirits (2022))
- "A Minor Exorcism" (2020 - collected in Yamada Monogatari: Troubled Spirits (2022))
- "The Fox's Daughter" (2021 - collected in Yamada Monogatari: Troubled Spirits (2022))
- "The Ame Onna" (2022 - collected in Yamada Monogatari: Troubled Spirits (2022))
- "One Rainy Day, With Spirits" (2022 - collected in Yamada Monogatari: Troubled Spirits (2022))

=== The Laws of Power ===
==== Novels ====
1. The Long Look (2008)
2. Black Kath's Daughter (2012)
3. Power's Shadow (2015)
4. The Seventh Law of Power (2025)

==== Collections ====
1. The Collected Tymon the Black (2017)

==== Short stories ====
- "What Power Holds" (1994 – incorporated in Black Kath's Daughter (2012))
- "The Third Law of Power" (1995 – incorporated in Black Kath's Daughter (2012))
- "A Time for Heroes" (1996 – collected in Worshipping Small Gods (2007) and The Collected Tymon the Black (2017); incorporated in The Long Look (2008))
- "The 4th Law of Power" (2000 – incorporated in Power's Shadow (2015))
- "The First Law of Power" (2001 – incorporated in Black Kath's Daughter (2012))
- "Empty Places" (2005 – collected in The Collected Tymon the Black (2017))
- "The Devil of Details" (2008 – collected in The Collected Tymon the Black (2017))

=== Eli Mothersbaugh ===
==== Collections ====
- Ghost Trouble: The Casefiles of Eli Mothersbaugh (collection, 2013)

==== Short stories ====
- "Wrecks" (1998 – collected in The Ogre's Wife (2002) and Ghost Trouble (2013))
- "The God of Children" (2000 – collected in The Ogre's Wife (2002) and Ghost Trouble (2013))
- "A Respectful Silence" (2001 – collected in The Ogre's Wife (2002) and Ghost Trouble (2013))
- "A Hint of Jasmine" (2004 – collected in Worshipping Small Gods (2007) and Ghost Trouble (2013))
- "Voices in an Empty Room" (2004 – collected in Worshipping Small Gods (2007) and Ghost Trouble (2013))
- "Hanagan's Kiyomatsu, 1923" (2007 – collected in Worshipping Small Gods (2007) and Ghost Trouble (2013))
- "Diva" (2007 – collected in Worshipping Small Gods (2007) and Ghost Trouble (2013))
- "Beacons" (2011 – collected in Ghost Trouble (2013))
- "Muramasa's Rage" (2011 – collected in Ghost Trouble (2013))
- "His Hour Upon the Stage" (2011 – collected in Ghost Trouble (2013))
- "Souvenirs" (2011 – collected in Ghost Trouble (2013))
- "The Missing Ghost" (2011 – collected in Ghost Trouble (2013))

=== Errant Fae ===
==== Collections ====
- Tales From the Black Dog (2020)

==== Novellas and short stories ====
- Little Fire and Fog (2019)
- "Neutral Ground" (2020 - collected in Tales From the Black Dog (2020))
- "Hair of the Black Dog" (2020 - collected in Tales From the Black Dog (2020))
- "Contingency Plan" (2020 - collected in Tales From the Black Dog (2020))
- "Well, Something Ever After" (2020 - collected in Tales From the Black Dog (2020))
- "A Sense of Humor" (2020 - collected in Tales From the Black Dog (2020))
- "A Good Pair of Shoes" (2020 - collected in Tales From the Black Dog (2020))
- "Evening With a Drunken Muse" (2020 - collected in Tales From the Black Dog (2020))
- "A Drink With Friends" (2020 - collected in Tales From the Black Dog (2020))
- "Heather Brew" (2020 - collected in Tales From the Black Dog (2020))
- "Where No One Knows Your Name" (2020 - collected in Tales From the Black Dog (2020))
- "Star Light, Star Bright" (2020 - collected in Tales From the Black Dog (2020))

=== Somna's World ===
==== Novels ====
- A Warrior of Dreams (2011)

==== Short stories ====
- "Laying the Stones" (1994 – incorporated in A Warrior of Dreams (2011))
- "The Man Who Carved Skulls" (2007 – collected in On the Banks of the River of Heaven (2010))
- "Courting the Lady Scythe" (2008 – collected in On the Banks of the River of Heaven (2010))

=== Pan Bao and Jing ===
==== Short stories ====
- "In Memory of Jianhong, Snake-Devil" (2017)
- "On the Road to the Hell of Hungry Ghosts" (2017)
- "An Account of the Madness of the Magistrate, Chengdhu Village" (2018)
- "My Blue Silk Fan" (2026)

=== Bergstryker U. ===
==== Collections ====
- Bergstryker U: Where Monsters and Humans Mingle (collection, 2020)

==== Novellas ====
- The Face of an Angel (as W. J. Everett) (2011 - collected in Bergstryker U (2020))
- The Voice of a Demon (as W. J. Everett) (2014 - collected in Bergstryker U (2020))

== Other novels ==
- Spirits of Wood and Stone (2011)
- The Blood Red Scarf (2011)
- The Ghost War (2012)
- All the Gates of Hell (2013)

== Other collections ==
- The Ogre's Wife: Fairy Tales For Grownups (2002)
- Worshipping Small Gods (2007)
- On the Banks of the River of Heaven (2010)
- Our Lady of 47 Ursae Majoris (2011)
- The Devil Has His Due (2012)
- Two for Christmas (2013)
- The God of Small Troubles and Other Stories (2014)
- Tales From the Black Dog (2020)
- Fairy Tale Flash (2020)

== Other separately published short works ==
- Hereafter, and After (2007)
- Four Horsemen, at Their Leisure (2011)
- The Heavenly Fox (2011)
- A Hint of Evil (2012)
- In the Realm of Legend (2016)
- In the Palace of the Jade Lion (2020)

== Other short stories ==
- "Sessinahn" (1979)
- "Echoes" (1979) (as B. Richard Parks)
- "Quest of the Eldbrand" (1981)
- "The Passing" (1981) (as Rick Parks)
- "Big Ears" (1985) (as B. Richard Parks)
- "Daughter of the Heartwood" (1987 – incorporated in The Ghost War (2012)) (as Rick Parks)
- "Ghostcaller" (1994)
- "Simple Souls" (1994)
- "Coffin.Nail" (1995)
- "Notes from the Bridge" (1995)
- "Quiet, Please" (1995 – incorporated in The Blood Red Scarf (2011))
- "Revival" (1995)
- "The Last Waltz" (1995)
- "The Ogre's Wife" (1995 – collected in The Ogre's Wife (2002))
- "They Call Him King" (1995)
- "Eucharist" (1997 – collected in Our Lady of 47 Ursae Majoris (2011))
- "Knacker Man" (1997)
- "Poppa's Children" (1997 – collected in Our Lady of 47 Ursae Majoris (2011))
- "The Right Sort of Flea" (1997)
- "My Lord Teaser" (1997 – collected in The Ogre's Wife (2002))
- "A Thing or Two About Love" (1997)
- "Lord Madoc and the Red Knight" (1997)
- "Idle Conversation at the End of the World" (1998)
- "Beauty of Things Unseen" (1999 – collected in The Ogre's Wife (2002))
- "Doppels" (1999 – collected in The Ogre's Wife (2002))
- "Take a Long Step" (1999 – collected in The Ogre's Wife (2002))
- "Thy Golden Stair" (1999)
- "Borrowed Lives" (1999 – collected in The Ogre's Wife (2002))
- "How Konti Scrounged the World" (2000 – collected in The Ogre's Wife (2002))
- "Crows" (2000 – collected in Our Lady of 47 Ursae Majoris (2011))
- "Judgment Day" (2000 – collected in The Ogre's Wife (2002))
- "Golden Bell, Seven, and the Marquis of Zeng" (2000 – collected in The Ogre's Wife (2002))
- "A Place to Begin" (2001 – collected in The Ogre's Wife (2002))
- "The Trickster's Wife" (2001 – collected in The Ogre's Wife (2002))
- "Keeping Lalande Station" (2001 – collected in Our Lady of 47 Ursae Majoris (2011))
- "Kallisti" (2002 – collected in Worshipping Small Gods (2007))
- "Doing Time in the Wild Hunt" (2002)
- "The End of the Dance, the Beginning" (2002)
- "Punishment" (2002 – collected in Our Lady of 47 Ursae Majoris (2011))
- "Some Archival Material on the 2198 Stellar Expedition" (2002 – collected in Our Lady of 47 Ursae Majoris (2011))
- "The Plum Blossom Lantern" (2003 – collected in Worshipping Small Gods (2007))
- "Worshipping Small Gods" (2003 – collected in Worshipping Small Gods (2007))
- "Yamabushi" (2003 – collected in Worshipping Small Gods (2007))
- "The Great Big Out" (2004 – collected in Our Lady of 47 Ursae Majoris (2011))
- "The Right God" (2004 – collected in Worshipping Small Gods (2007))
- "Lord Goji's Wedding" (2005 – collected in On the Banks of the River of Heaven (2010))
- "Death, the Devil, and the Lady in White" (2005 – collected in Worshipping Small Gods (2007))
- "The Penultimate Riddle" (2005 – collected in Worshipping Small Gods (2007))
- "The Finer Points of Destruction" (2005 – collected in On the Banks of the River of Heaven (2010))
- "The Last Romantic" (2006)
- "Another Kind of Glamour" (2006)
- "Subversion Clause" (2006 – collected in The Devil Has His Due (2012))
- "Brillig" (2006 – collected in On the Banks of the River of Heaven (2010))
- "Conversation in the Tomb of an Unknown King" (2006)
- "A Pinch of Salt" (2006 – collected in On the Banks of the River of Heaven (2010))
- "A Garden in Hell" (2006 – collected in On the Banks of the River of Heaven (2010))
- "Directional Drift" (2007 – collected in Our Lady of 47 Ursae Majoris (2011))
- "Wizard of Wasted Time" (2007 – collected in Worshipping Small Gods (2007))
- "On the Wheel" (2008 – collected in On the Banks of the River of Heaven (2010))
- "On the Banks of the River of Heaven" (2008 – collected in On the Banks of the River of Heaven (2010))
- "Our Lady of 47 Ursae Majoris" (2008 – collected in Our Lady of 47 Ursae Majoris (2011))
- "Skin Deep" (2008 – collected in On the Banks of the River of Heaven (2010))
- "A Road Once Traveled" (2009)
- "Night, in Dark Perfection" (2009)
- "The White Bone Fan" (2009)
- "One Lone Mountain, Shining White" (2010)
- "The Queen's Reason" (2010)
- "Four Horsemen, at Their Leisure" (2010)
- "Signs Along the Road" (2010 – collected in Our Lady of 47 Ursae Majoris (2011))
- "Soft as Spider Silk" (2010 – collected in On the Banks of the River of Heaven (2010))
- "The Feather Cloak" (2010 – collected in On the Banks of the River of Heaven (2010))
- "The Twa Corbies, Revisited" (2010 – collected in On the Banks of the River of Heaven (2010))
- "Drowning My Sorrows" (2011)
- "The Swan Troika" (2011)
- "Passing Zero Point" (2011 – collected in Our Lady of 47 Ursae Majoris (2011))
- "In the Palace of the Jade Lion" (2012 - revised ebook version 2020)
- "Closing Time" (2012 – collected in The Devil Has His Due (2012))
- "Miss Jean Takes a Walk" (2012)
- "One Blissful Night at the Inferno Lounge" (2012 – collected in The Devil Has His Due (2012))
- "Boiling the Frog" (2012 – collected in The Devil Has His Due (2012))
- "Sidney's Cotton" (2013)
- "Beach Bum and the Drowned Girl" (2013)
- "Cherry Blossoms on the River of Souls" (2013)
- "Cold Christmas" (2013 – collected in Two for Christmas (2013))
- "Have a Good Day" (2013 – collected in Two for Christmas (2013))
- "The Manor of Lost Time" (2014)
- "The God of Small Troubles" (2014 – collected in The God of Small Troubles (2014))
- "Anchors and Sails" (2014 – collected in The God of Small Troubles (2014))
- "Olam Drexler's School for Exceptional Children" (2014 – collected in The God of Small Troubles (2014))
- "Small Deaths" (2014 – collected in The God of Small Troubles (2014))
- "Miss Jean Takes a Walk" (2014 – collected in The God of Small Troubles (2014))
- "The Cat of Five Virtues" (2017)
- "Salt of the Earth" (2017)
- "Drowning My Sorrows" (2017)
- "Crack'd From Side to Side" (2017)
- "The Queen of Diamonds" (2017)
- "Ugly Puppies" (2017)
- "The Arrangement" (2018)
- "The Funambulist" (2018)
- "Could be Worse" (2018)
- "A Matter of Vision" (2018)
- "The Fourth Apprentice" (2018)
- "Legends of the Singing River" (2018)
- "Beauty, Wide Awake" (2018 – collected in Fairy Tale Flash (2020))
- "A Mother's Love" (2018 – collected in Fairy Tale Flash (2020))
- "The Testament of the Goat Troll" (2019 – collected in Fairy Tale Flash (2020))
- "The Professional" (2019)
- "The ComeUp Pence" (2019)
- "It's a Puzzle" (2020)
- "Liminal Conversation" (2020)
- "Invasive Species" (2020)
- "Subject to Interpretation" (2020)
- "Another Fairy Tale" (2020 – collected in Fairy Tale Flash (2020))
- "The Changeling, Part 1" (2020 – collected in Fairy Tale Flash (2020))
- "The Changeling, Part 2" (2020 – collected in Fairy Tale Flash (2020))
- "Drink to Me" (2020)
- "Mostly True Thomas" (2020 – collected in Fairy Tale Flash (2020))
- "Consider the Possibility" (2020 – collected in Fairy Tale Flash (2020))
- "The Giant's Heart" (2020 – collected in Fairy Tale Flash (2020))
- "Learning the Rules" (2020 – collected in Fairy Tale Flash (2020))
- "Spelling Danger" (2020 – collected in Fairy Tale Flash (2020))
- "My Favorite" (2020 – collected in Fairy Tale Flash (2020))
- "Seeking Fortune" (2020 – collected in Fairy Tale Flash (2020))
- "Shiny Rocks" (2020 – collected in Fairy Tale Flash (2020))
- "Superfluous" (2020 – collected in Fairy Tale Flash (2020))
- "On the Night Shore" (2020 – collected in Fairy Tale Flash (2020))
- "The Fourth Meeting" (2020 – collected in Fairy Tale Flash (2020))
- "Only a Mother" (2020 – collected in Fairy Tale Flash (2020))
- "The Stowaway" (2020 – collected in Fairy Tale Flash (2020))
- "The Borrowed Fife" (2020 – collected in Fairy Tale Flash (2020))
- "Contemplating Forever" (2021)
- "Lapis Philosophorum" (2021)
- "Royal Dilemma" (2021)
