= Dungeons & Dragons in other media =

The Dungeons & Dragons (D&D) fantasy role-playing game has been adapted into many related products, including magazines, films and video games.

== Magazines ==
In 1975, TSR began publishing The Strategic Review. At the time, role-playing games were still seen as a subgenre of the wargaming industry, and the magazine was designed not only to support D&D and TSR's other games, but also to cover wargaming in general. In short order, however, the popularity and growth of D&D made it clear that the game had not only separated itself from its wargaming origins, but had launched an entirely new industry unto itself. The following year, after only seven issues, TSR cancelled The Strategic Review and replaced it in 1976 with The Dragon (later Dragon Magazine).

Although Dragon Magazine was originally designed to support the role-playing industry in general, it has always been primarily a house organ for TSR's games with a particular focus on D&D. Most of the magazine's articles provide supplementary material for the game, including new races, classes, spells, traps, monsters, skills, and rules. Other articles will provide tips and suggestions for players and DMs. The magazine has also published a number of well-known, gamer-oriented comic strips over the years, including Wormy, SnarfQuest, Yamara, Knights of the Dinner Table, Nodwick, Dork Tower, and The Order of the Stick.

Between 1983 and 1985, TSR's UK branch published Imagine Magazine. It featured similar content to Dragon, focusing on D&D and Advanced Dungeons & Dragons (AD&D). Imagine featured a monthly series of articles about a new campaign world, Pelinore, which were later continued in the non-TSR magazine Game Master. Some material that originated in Imagine was eventually incorporated into Unearthed Arcana.

In 1986, TSR launched a new magazine to complement Dragon. Dungeon Adventures, published bimonthly, published nothing but adventure modules for Dungeon Masters. While Dungeon now publishes other kinds of material as well, Dungeons & Dragons adventures remain its main focus.

While many other magazines have partially or fully devoted themselves to supporting D&D, Dragon and Dungeon remain the only two official publications for the game. In 2002, Wizards of the Coast licensed the two magazines to Paizo Publishing. Publication of both magazines then ceased in September 2007 as the owning company opted for an online model, citing a downturn in the market for low-circulation specialty and hobby magazines. In total, there were 359 Dragon issues and 150 Dungeon issues released in print. The final 3rd Edition issue of Dragon was #362, and the final 3rd Edition issue of Dungeon was #153. The online version of the magazines are up to issue #408 and #201 respectively as of April 2012.

== Film and television ==
=== Animation ===
An animated television series, titled Dungeons & Dragons, was produced in 1983. The cartoon was based upon the concept of a small group of young adults and children who get transported to a D&D-based fantasy realm by riding a magical roller coaster. When they arrive, they are given potent magical weapons and must survive against the chromatic dragon Tiamat and a power-hungry nemesis called Venger. They are assisted in each episode by a gnome-like creature called Dungeon Master and a baby unicorn named Uni.

In 2003, a computer-animated motion picture entitled Scourge of Worlds: A Dungeons & Dragons Adventure was produced for DVD, featuring the iconic characters (Regdar, Mialee, and Lidda) created for the 3rd Edition. This is an interactive movie that asks viewers to decide what actions the heroes should take at crucial points in the story, allowing hundreds of different story-telling combinations. A special edition was released later that included even more choices, two additional endings, the making of the Scourge of Worlds, and the original (linear) version of film.

The official Dragonlance Chronicles animated film, Dragonlance: Dragons of Autumn Twilight was released straight to video in January 2008. The film stars the voices of Michael Rosenbaum as Tanis, Kiefer Sutherland as Raistlin, Lucy Lawless as Goldmoon, and Michelle Trachtenberg as Tika.

Secret Level (2024), an adult animated anthology series, featured a Dungeons & Dragons themed episode titled "The Queen's Cradle". The episode focuses on a group of adventurers saving a young man from the Cult of the Dragon before facing off against Tiamat.

=== Live action ===
A live action film, titled Dungeons & Dragons, was released in 2000 to largely negative critical reception. Dungeons & Dragons: Wrath of the Dragon God, a made-for-TV sequel, was first aired on the Sci-Fi Channel on October 8, 2005, receiving better critical reception, and was released on February 7, 2006 on DVD. This sequel is also known by the alternate title Dungeons & Dragons 2: The Elemental Might. A third film, Dungeons & Dragons: The Book of Vile Darkness, was released in 2012. In 2013, Warner Bros. acquired rights to make a film based on Dungeons & Dragons, using a script written by David Leslie Johnson. Hasbro and its subsidiary Wizards of the Coast then sued Sweetpea Entertainment, producer of the first three D&D films, over its movie deal with Warner claiming that the film rights (TV and feature) have expired. In 2015, Warner Brothers reached a settlement with Hasbro's Allspark Pictures and Sweetpea Entertainment over rights and a new film was in the works.

As a result of the settlement, Hasbro transferred rights to Paramount Pictures by 2017. Chris McKay was originally brought in to direct the film, but was replaced by Jonathan Goldstein and John Francis Daley. Chris Pine and Hugh Grant were cast in the film. Dungeons & Dragons: Honor Among Thieves was released in March 2023.

By January 2022, Hasbro's eOne was developing a live action D&D series with Rawson Marshall Thurber writing and directing the pilot. By January 2023, Paramount+ gave this series an eight-episode, straight-to-series order with Thurber directing the first episode and co-production by eOne and Paramount Pictures. However, in May 2024, Paramount+ announced that they were no longer moving forward with the series. Deadline reported that the series will now be overseen "by Hasbro's in-house division Hasbro Entertainment following eOne's December 2023 sale to Lionsgate" with a new creative team and "will undergo a creative update before being taken out to other potential buyers". The series was revived in February 2025, with the series to be produced by Hasbro Entertainment in partnership with Netflix, and executive producer Shawn Levy and series writer Drew Crevello. Development was cancelled in place of a new series that will be based on the Ravenloft campaign setting, in partnership with executive producer Alfonso Cuarón and series writer John August.

=== Documentary ===
By October 2022, Hasbro's eOne began to develop a documentary on Dungeons & Dragons to coincide with the 50th anniversary of the game in 2024. Joe Manganiello and Kyle Newman will co-direct; Manganiello will also produce along with Nick Manganiello, Anthony Savini and Cecily Tyler. The documentary will feature more than 400 hours of archived, never-before-seen Dungeons & Dragons footage from the game's creation in the early 1970s, and interviews with celebrity fans of the game.

== Stage ==
The stage production of Dungeons & Dragons: The Twenty-Sided Tavern officially opened off-Broadway on May 5, 2024, after previews began in April, at Stage 42 in New York City. The show combines actual play, improv, and immersive theater as the players navigate an adventure set in the Forgotten Realms; audience participation ranges from select members joining the cast on stage to browser-based voting software to determine cast actions. The player cast can perform as various versions of their archetypes which are selected by the audience. In December 2024, it opened at the Sydney Opera House. The show is scheduled to go on tour in July 2025.

== Theme park attraction ==
From April to May 2025, the Dungeons & Dragons: Secrets of Waterdeep attraction was available at Universal Studios Hollywood as part of their "Universal Fan Fest Nights" program. This attraction featured a guided performance across various themed rooms; it also includes a life-sized puppet of Xanathar, created by the Jim Henson's Creature Shop, that is operated by a live puppeteer. The attraction returned as part of the 2026 "Universal Fan Fest Nights" lineup.

Lin Codega of Rascal commented the attraction is a "Hollywood soundstage reserved for five rooms, one puzzle, and a static storytelling experience" which "looks incredible" but lacks the typical horror theming "at the root of this style of Universal installation" which leads it to seem "a little perfunctory". Christina Radish of Collider highlighted that the Horror Nights houses take up "50-60% of the same space" in comparison, noting that "one of the most impressive things about the space for this experience is the amount of set dressing and the amount of Easter eggs". Codega similarly thought that "the set design and detail are very cool", highlighting that every "room is full of cheeky winks to D&D lore" and in particular, the Xanathar puppet is "bright and fearsome and delightful". Sabina Graves of Io9 explained that Xanathar "sits on a pile of gold and it's a towering behemoth—think Audrey II's final form in Little Shop of Horrors or for Horror Nights Fans, the Alien Queen from the Alien vs. Predator house". Graves commented that it is "so cool that" Xanathar is "not solely a pre-programmed animatronic and brings in that immersive gaming feel with a puppeteer putting on a performance, which almost makes it feel like you're in a Jim Henson Dungeons & Dragons movie". Codega also opined on the gap between D&D Experiences and the game itself, noting that the goal of this attraction "is to have a fun, associative brand experience"; the attraction "takes out imagination and replaces it with a physical reality, swapping personal investiture for immersion" – "as experiences begin to dominate the entryways into tabletop roleplaying games as the attention economy is continually left breathless at the sight of a thousand-pound dragon, our rituals of play are routinely sacrificed on the altar of corporate control".

== Web series ==
Wizards of the Coast has created, produced and sponsored multiple web series featuring Dungeons & Dragons. These shows have typically aired on the official Dungeons & Dragons Twitch and YouTube channels. Some have been adapted into podcasts. Types of shows include actual play series, event livestreams, and talk shows. According to Hasbro CEO Brian Goldner, viewers on Twitch and YouTube spent over 150 million hours watching D&D gameplay in 2020.

Christian Hoffer of ComicBook.com and academic Emily Friedman, writing for Los Angeles Review of Books, both noted that by 2022, official streaming shows were no longer financially supported by Wizards of the Coast, which included "the long-running Rivals of Waterdeep" (2018–22). Instead, the company shifted to occasional funding for miniseries and standalone "one shot" episodes. Hoffer commented that "the once-thriving Dungeons & Dragons Twitch channel has been mostly offline for months, with Wizards' few sponsored shows wrapping up their campaigns last year or continuing on without Wizards’ support".

In November 2023, Hasbro's Entertainment One launched the Dungeons & Dragons Adventures FAST channel, available on platforms such as Amazon Freevee and Plex, which featured new actual play web series, reruns of the animated Dungeons & Dragons series, and reruns of other Dungeons & Dragons web series. In April 2026, Wizards of the Coast launched a new actual play titled Dungeon Masters. Following the show's announcement, Francesco Cacciatore of Polygon noted it has "been years since D&D had an ongoing, official actual play, produced and managed by" Wizards of the Coast".

== Computer and video games ==
Many unique digital games had been released and sold under the D&D license. A significant number of these games were published by Strategic Simulations, Inc. (SSI). Most, but not all, are role-playing video games that use rules derived from some version of the D&D rules. Many of the games were released on multiple platforms, including personal computers, consoles, and handheld devices (including mobile phones). Two themed pinball machines have also been released, one in 1987 and one in 2025.

In 2024, Gameloft Montreal announced it was developing a Dungeons & Dragons game, blending survival, life simulation, action RPG and building. In 2026, the director of Gameloft, Alexandre De Rochefort, announced they were aiming for a late 2027 release, without providing further details about the game.

== Novels ==
Several hundred novels have been published based upon Dungeons & Dragons.

- Fantasy Grand Master Andre Norton's novel Quag Keep, published in 1979, was set in Greyhawk, making it the first novel to use a D&D campaign setting.
- Throughout the early 1980s, TSR printed several series of gamebooks of varying complexity under series titles such as Endless Quest, Advanced Dungeons & Dragons Adventure Gamebooks, HeartQuest, and 1 on 1 Adventure Gamebooks. Most of these books were based on D&D, although some were based on other TSR role-playing games.
- The Dragonlance product line, begun in 1984, was the first series of novels produced by TSR and has since seen more than 190 titles published.
- D&D creator Gary Gygax's series of Gord the Rogue novels, published from 1985 to 1988, was set in his Greyhawk campaign setting. A number of other novels have also been set in Greyhawk.
- Numerous novels have been set in the Forgotten Realms campaign setting by such authors as R. A. Salvatore and setting creator Ed Greenwood.
- A number of books have also been published under the generic Dungeons & Dragons heading. They are as follows:

=== 2nd Edition novels ===
- Tale of the Comet (July 1997), by Roland J. Green (ISBN 0-7869-0654-5)
- The Rod of Seven Parts (February 25, 1996), by Douglas Niles (ISBN 0-7869-0479-8)

=== Dragon Strike ===
- The Wizard's Tale (October 1993), by Michael Andrews (ISBN 1-56076-896-7)
- The Thief's Tale (October 1993), by Michael Andrews (ISBN 1-56076-897-5)
- The Warrior's Tale (October 1993), by Michael Andrews (ISBN 1-56076-919-X)
- The Elf's Tale (October 1993), by Michael Andrews

=== Iconic character ===
- The Savage Caves (July 2002), by T. H. Lain (ISBN 0-7869-2845-X)
- The Living Dead (August 2002), by T. H. Lain (ISBN 0-7869-2848-4)
- Oath of Nerull (September 2002), by T. H. Lain (ISBN 0-7869-2851-4)
- City of Fire (November 2002), by T. H. Lain (ISBN 0-7869-2854-9)
- The Bloody Eye (January 2003), by T. H. Lain (ISBN 0-7869-2917-0)
- Treachery's Wake (March 2003), by T. H. Lain (ISBN 0-7869-2926-X)
- Plague of Ice (May 2003), by T. H. Lain (ISBN 0-7869-2953-7)
- The Sundered Arms (July 2003), by T. H. Lain (ISBN 0-7869-2974-X)
- Return of the Damned (October 2003), by T. H. Lain (ISBN 0-7869-3003-9)
- The Death Ray (December 2003), by T. H. Lain (ISBN 0-7869-3030-6)

=== Knights of the Silver Dragon ===
- Secret of the Spiritkeeper (June 2004), by Matt Forbeck (ISBN 0-7869-3143-4)
- Riddle in Stone (August 2004), by Ree Soesbee (ISBN 0-7869-3211-2)
- Sign of the Shapeshifter (October 2004), by Dale Donovan and Linda Johns (ISBN 0-7869-3220-1)
- Eye of Fortune (December 2004), by Denise Graham (ISBN 0-7869-3169-8)
- Figure in the Frost (February 2005), by Lana Perez (ISBN 0-7869-3587-1)
- Dagger of Doom (April 2005), by Kerry Daniel Roberts (ISBN 0-7869-3631-2)
- Hidden Dragon (June 2005), by Lisa Trutkoff Trumbauer (ISBN 0-7869-3748-3)
- The Silver Spell (August 2005), by Anjali Bannerjee (ISBN 0-7869-3750-5)
- Key to the Griffon's Lair (October 2005), by Candice Ransom (ISBN 0-7869-3827-7)
- Curse of the Lost Grove (December 2005), by Denise R. Graham (ISBN 0-7869-3829-3)
- Mystery of the Wizard's Tomb (February 2006), by Rachel Plummer (ISBN 0-7869-3990-7)
- Mark of the Yuan-Ti (April 2006), by Kerry Daniel Roberts (ISBN 0-7869-4033-6)
- Prophecy of the Dragons (June 2006) by Matt Forbeck (ISBN 9780786940318)
- The Dragons Revealed (August 2006) by Matt Forbeck (ISBN 0786940328)

=== Penhaligon ===
- The Tainted Sword (October 1992), by D.J. Heinrich (ISBN 1-56076-395-7)
- The Dragon's Tomb (October 1992), by D.J. Heinrich (ISBN 1-56076-592-5)
- The Fall of Magic (October 1993), by D.J. Heinrich (ISBN 1-56076-663-8)

=== 2010 relaunch ===
- The Mark of Nerath (August 2010), by Bill Slavicsek (ISBN 978-0-7869-5622-7)
- The Seal of Karga Kul (December 2010), by Alex Irvine (ISBN 978-0-7869-5572-5)
- The Last Garrison (December 2011), by Matthew Beard (ISBN 978-0-7869-5793-4)

==== The Abyssal Plague ====
- The Temple of the Yellow Skulls (March 2011), by Don Bassingthwaite (ISBN 978-0-7869-5749-1)
- Oath of Vigilance (August 2011), by James Wyatt (ISBN 978-0-7869-5816-0)
- The Eye of the Chained God (April 2012), by Don Bassingthwaite (ISBN 978-0-7869-5983-9)

=== HarperCollins ===
In 2021, HarperCollins Children's Books obtained exclusive rights to publish Dungeons & Dragons middle grade books such as "novels, illustrated chapter books, and graphic novels". The first book of the Dungeon Academy series, Dungeon Academy: No Humans Allowed by author Madeleine Roux and artist Tim Probert, was released in Fall 2021 and is set in the Forgotten Realms. Two other series began in 2022: an untitled Dungeons & Dragons graphic novel series by author Lee Knox Ostertag and artist Xanthe Bouma and the Dungeons & Dragons: HarperChapters series.

== Comics ==
=== 1985–2010 ===
During the 1980s and 1990s, DC Comics published several licensed D&D comics, including Advanced Dungeons & Dragons, Dragonlance, Forgotten Realms, and Spelljammer. Also during the 1980s, one-page "mini-comics" appeared as advertisements in both Marvel and DC publications, always ending with the line "To Be Continued..."

After the release of the 3rd Edition, KenzerCo, better known for the popular gaming comic Knights of the Dinner Table, secured the licensing rights to produce official D&D comics. Using the license, they produced a number of different mini-series. One notable mini-series for this comic line entitled Tempest's Gate was authored by Sean Smith. It featured memorable iconic characters of D&D such as Zed Kraken, a powerful and influential magus.

In 2002, Iron Hammer Graphics published the single-issue comic Vecna: Hand of the Revenent. In 2005, the license passed to Devil's Due Productions. Starting in June of that year, Devil's Due began releasing official adaptations of D&D tie-in novels, starting with Salvatore's Dark Elf Trilogy.

As webcomics grew, many D&D inspired comics were created with some of them even going as far as publishing physical books. Amongst the more popular ones are Rich Burlew's The Order of the Stick and Tarol Hunts's Goblins. The game has also been seen in several FoxTrot comic strips over the years played by Jason and his best friend Marcus.

=== 2010–2024: IDW Publishing ===
In 2010, IDW Publishing started publishing an ongoing Dungeons & Dragons comic based on the 4th Edition core setting which finished in February 2012. In 2011, they also released a limited series based on the Dark Sun campaign setting, as well as another series, Forgotten Realms: The Legend of Drizzt: Neverwinter Tales, written by R.A. Salvatore and based on his famous D&D character, Drizzt Do'Urden.

Since 2014, IDW Publishing have published several limited series based on the 5th Edition core setting starting with Legends of Baldur's Gate (2014) — Jim Zub "has had a hand in nearly every D&D comic since" this limited series was published. This series has five sequel limited series: Shadows of the Vampire (2016), Frost Giant's Fury (2017), Evil at Baldur's Gate (2018), Infernal Tide (2019), and Mindbreaker (2021). Two additional limited series have also been published: A Darkened Wish (2019) and At the Spine of the World (2020). In 2020, author B. Dave Walters was the Dungeon Master for A Darkened Wish, an official actual play web series, which was based on the comic; it ran for 30 episodes and ended in 2021.

In August 2018, a crossover comic with the adult animated sitcom Rick and Morty was published by IDW and Oni Press. The series titled Rick and Morty vs. Dungeons & Dragons is co-written by Jim Zub and Patrick Rothfuss, and drawn by Troy Little. A four-issue sequel, Rick and Morty vs. Dungeons & Dragons: Chapter II: Painscape, written by Jim Zub and Sarah Stern with art by Troy Little was published in 2019. A five-issue crossover comic with the television series Stranger Things was published by IDW and Dark Horse Comics on November 4, 2020.

=== 2025–present: Dark Horse Comics ===
In July 2024, Wizards of the Coast announced that Dark Horse Comics would gain the Dungeons & Dragons license in 2025. The first series, Dungeons and Dragons: The Fallbacks, is a four-issue series released in October 2025. It was written by Greg Pak; Pak explained that the series features an adventuring party first seen in the prose novel The Fallbacks: Bound for Ruin (2024) written by Jaleigh Johnson. A second four-issue limited series, titled Dungeons & Dragons: Total Party Killers, was announced in March 2026. It features an adventuring party of monsters attempting to escape a wizard's lair after the wizard's death. It is written by Christopher Hastings with art by Denis Medri and colors by Dan Jackson; the first issue was released on July 22, 2026.

Announced in April 2026, the upcoming four-issue limited series Dungeons & Dragons: Ravenloft will be released as part of Wizards of the Coast's "Season of Horror", which includes the new sourcebook Ravenloft: The Horrors Within (2026). It will be written by Amy Chu with art by Ariela Kristantina and colors by Arif Prianto; the first issue is scheduled to be published on August 19, 2026. The series will focus on monster hunter Ez D'Avenir and the Darklord Viktra Mordenheim.

At San Diego Comic-Con 2026, Dark Horse Comics announced a new ongoing series, titled Dungeons & Dragons, scheduled to debut in November 2026. It will be written by Jackson Lanzing and Collin Kelly with pencils by Ibraim Roberson, ink by Arabson Oliveira, and colors by Dan Brown. Set in the Forgotten Realms, the series will feature a depowered Mordenkainen attempting to stop a draconic apocalypse while teaming up with other characters, such as Volo and Tasha. Dark Horse Comics also teased an upcoming Baldur's Gate III comic series.

== Board games ==
Several board games have been sold either under the Dungeons & Dragons trademark or in association with it:

- Dungeon! (1975), a board game published by TSR, featured similar gameplay and genre tropes to D&D and was frequently advertised in D&D products.
- Dungeons & Dragons Computer Labyrinth Game (1980), the first computer/board game hybrid and the first D&D licensed game that contained digital electronics.
- Quest for the Dungeonmaster (1984)
- Dragons of Glory (1986)
- Dragon Lance (1988)
- Mertwig's Maze (1988) by Tom Wham
- The New Dungeon (1989)
- The New Dungeon Miniatures and Game Supplement (1989)
- Magestones (1990)
- Greyhawk Wars (1991)
- The New Easy to Master Dungeons & Dragons Game (1991) - this game is in a way an introduction to role-playing games, but is played as a board game. Three expansions were released for it: Dragon's Den, Haunted Tower, and Goblin's Lair.
- Dragon Quest (1992)
- The Classic Dungeon (1992)
- DragonStrike (1993) used a simplified form of D&D and included an instructional video tape in which costumed actors, combined with computer-generated imagery, played the characters and monsters from the board game.
- First Quest (1994) was the name of the AD&D game that first featured an audio CD which included instructions and two quests that coincide with two of the four adventures in the included Adventure Book.
- Clue Dungeons & Dragons (2001) - standard Clue with a D&D fantasy theme and optional wandering monsters.
- Dungeons & Dragons: The Fantasy Adventure Board Game (2002) - cooperative dungeon crawl game in which a party of four heroes strives to complete adventures that the Dungeon Master puts before them (in the style of HeroQuest). Two expansions have been released for this game:
  - Eternal Winter (2004)
  - Forbidden Forest (2005)
- Dungeons & Dragons Basic Game (2004 & 2006) - a simplified version of the D&D role-playing game, designed as an introduction to role-playing, but is in essence a board game in the style of presentation.
- Castle Ravenloft Board Game (2010) - the first of the Adventure System board games
- Wrath of Ashardalon (2011)
- Conquest of Nerath (2011)
- The Legend of Drizzt Board Game (2011)
- Lords of Waterdeep (2012) - a German-style board game
- Dungeon Command (2012)
- Temple of Elemental Evil (2015)
- Tyrants of the Underdark (2016)
- Rock Paper Wizard (2016) - a card game where players are competing wizards in a race for loot.
- Betrayal at Baldur's Gate (2017) - a D&D themed version of Betrayal at House on the Hill.
- Tomb of Annihilation (Adventure System Board Game) (2017)
- Assault of the Giants (2017) - a game where players command one of six types of giants and compete to claim the right to rule over all giantkind.
- Dragonfire (2017) - a deckbuilder game.
- Dungeon Mayhem (2018) - a card game where players are competing to be the last adventurer standing.
- Waterdeep: Dungeon of the Mad Mage (2019) - a board game, released with standard and premium edition.
- Dungeons & Dragons: Adventure Begins (2020) - a board game, Gloomhaven style game loosely based on D&D with a bent on telling stories and having no Dungeon Master.
- Dungeons & Dragons: Onslaught (2023) - a competitive miniatures skirmish board game.

== Toys ==
- From 1983 to 1984, LJN produced a line of Advanced Dungeons & Dragons action figures.
- The Official Advanced Dungeons & Dragons Coloring Album was published in 1979 by Troubador Press and TSR, written by Gary Gygax and illustrated by Greg Irons. It was both a coloring book and a mini adventure module.
- Lego released a series of minifigures based on Dungeons & Dragons.

== Software ==
- Dragonfire II: The Dungeonmaster's Assistant – designed to assist a dungeon master in managing campaigns.
- AD&D Dungeon Masters Assistant Volume I: Encounters (1988, SSI)
- AD&D Dungeon Masters Assistant Volume II: Characters & Treasures (1989)
- Advanced Dungeons & Dragons CD-ROM Core Rules (1996) — collection of tools for players (ISBN 0-7869-0602-2)
- Core Rules CD-ROM 2.0 (1998) — collection of tools for players (ISBN 0-7869-0793-2)
  - Core Rules 2.0 EXPANSION (1999) — updates for Core Rules CD-ROM 2.0 (ISBN 0-7869-1543-9)
- Dragon Magazine Archive (1999) — collection of 257 magazines and newsletters (ISBN 0-7869-1448-3)
- Forgotten Realms Interactive Atlas (1999) — collection of editable maps of the Forgotten Realms world Toril (ISBN 0-7869-1451-3)
- Dungeons & Dragons Character Builder (2008) — 4th Edition Character Generator released as part of the Dungeons & Dragons Insider initiative. The free version only lets characters of level 3 or less be created.

== Soundtrack ==
The first official soundtrack to Dungeons & Dragons was produced when Wizards of the Coast teamed up with Midnight Syndicate, producing the 24-track album Dungeons & Dragons. The album was released on August 12, 2003, and received positive reviews from both the gaming and music community.
