= Ghost Trouble =

2011 collection of mystery fantasy short stories by Richard Parks

Ghost Trouble: The Casefiles of Eli Mothersbaugh
- Cover of first edition
- Author: Richard Parks
- Language: English
- Series: Eli Mothersbaugh
- Genre: Fantasy
- Publisher: Canemill Publishing
- Publication date: 2011
- Publication place: United States
- Media type: ebook, print (paperback)
- Pages: 291
- ISBN: 978-1481968171

Ghost Trouble: The Casefiles of Eli Mothersbaugh is a collection of mystery fantasy short stories by American writer Richard Parks, gathering together the stories featuring his ghost hunter character Eli Mothersbaugh. It was first published as an ebook on Kindle in October 2011; a trade paperback edition was issued by Canemill Publishing in January 2013.

== Summary ==
In an alternate near future, the existence of "bio-remnants" (ghosts) has been scientifically proven, making humanity cognizant of the paranormal and the problems sometimes associated with it. A government agency, the Bureau of Bio-Remnant Reconciliation, has been established to deal with them, and that's the job of field agent Eli Mothersbaugh, physically sensitive to ghosts' psychic energy fields and possessed of the latest high tech detection gear. He is aided in four of the last six cases by academic Bonnie Simmer, whom he meets in the story "Diva." The book collects all twelve of Eli's adventures, including five previously unpublished.

== Contents ==
- "Wrecks" (from Odyssey, issue 2, 1998) – High-tech ghost hunter Eli Mothersbaugh tries to bring peace to a ghost haunting a train station—and the ghost's living daughter.
- "The God of Children" (from Asimov's Science Fiction, v. 24, no. 12, Dec. 2000) – Eli is summoned to Japan by his old friend Hiro Yamada, whose mother is haunted by an unusual spirit.
- "A Respectful Silence" (from Realms of Fantasy, v. 8, no. 2, Dec. 2001) – At an abandoned airfield, Eli assists a pilot's ghost in making her final report.
- "A Hint of Jasmine" (from Asimov's Science Fiction, v. 28 no. 8, Aug. 2004) – Eli is commissioned to solve a mystery involving the ghosts of Water Oaks Plantation.
- "Voices in an Empty Room" (from Haunted Holidays, Oct. 2004) – Eli investigates the ghostly mystery behind a terrorist attack that rocked the town of Canemill, Mississippi.
- "Hanagan's Kiyomatsu, 1923" (from Worshipping Small Gods, 2007) – A rare Japanese print has been destroyed by the ghost of its late owner; Eli must discover why.
- "Diva" (from Worshipping Small Gods, 2007) – Eli is asked to exorcise a ghost of an opera singer haunting the auditorium of Armfield State University. But should he?
- "Beacons" – Eli investigates a report of a phantom storm hitting a barrier island, only to find no evidence of its energies—until he realizes he's looking in the wrong place.
- "Muramasa's Rage" – Hiro Yamada calls Eli and Bonnie back to Japan to look into the threatened theft of a legendary sword—by a ghost. Which, they discover, has been making the attempt the past four hundred years. But it's getting stronger...
- "His Hour Upon the Stage" – Larry Williams, key actor of the Cobblestone Players, is dead, and his ghost is apparently disrupting their latest production. It's up to Eli to find out why.
- "Souvenirs" – Susan Christensen must auction off her late father's World War II memorabilia to avoid foreclosure on her home, which seems to disturb her father's spirit. Looks like another job for Eli.
- "The Missing Ghost" – On sabbatical, Eli is happily teaching Bio Remnant Behavior 101 at Armfield State when he, Bonnie and promising student Toni Jackson all dream of the college's resident ghost, Madame Caldwell, in peril. As she has gone missing, a rescue expedition is in order—but the rescuers soon find they need rescuing themselves.

== Reception ==
Reviewer Don D'Ammassa puts "'The God of Children' [among] my two personal favorites" in the stories that appeared in Parks's first short story collection, The Ogre's Wife. He cites the four Eli Mothersbaugh tales appearing in Parks's second collection, Worshipping Small Gods, as evidence their writer is not "a one note author," noting their "contemporary settings and a much more somber tone ... closer to horror fiction, [though] the approach is more matter of fact and there is little actual menace, though certainly considerable mystery. ... I liked 'A Hint of Jasmine' and 'Diva' the best of these."

Publishers Weekly highlights "Voices in an Empty Room" as among the stories particularly noteworthy in its review of Worshipping Small Gods, finding it "[t]he most compelling entry" in the collection.

Ray Olson of Booklist calls the "stories [that] feature benevolent ghostbuster Eli Mothersbaugh of Canemill, Mississippi, ... so fine, sensitive, and southern that Eudora Welty might approve of them."

Richard Larson calls the Mothersbaugh stories "about truth, as any good mystery story should be: the visible truth, the hidden truth, the false truth, and the real truth ... often conflicting, especially when people don't want to know the truth at all ... they want the ghosts gone, but they rarely want to deal with why the ghosts are there in the first place." He notes that the series "creates a hybrid genre—science fiction/fantasy/mystery—that convincingly and delightfully creates a world ... in which the past is a bothersome but ever-present encroachment upon daily life." Regarding the individual tales, he feels "A Hint of Jasmine" "clips along like any solid mystery with a steady drip of clues," while rating "Voices in an Empty Room" a "weaker story" and "Hanagan's Kiyomatsu, 1923" "a simple trotting out of Parks's developing formula." "Diva," on the other hand, is "sweet and unabashedly sentimental, a journey to restore things to the way they once were, and it functions strongly as an end to the arc by commenting on what has come before." Larson praises it for combining "all the notable aspects of Parks's skill set: compassion for his protagonist, a mystery to be solved, an endearing love story, a past to uncover, and the quirkiness that is painfully lacking in some of the more minor stories."
