= List of role-playing game software =

Role-playing game software, as opposed to role-playing video games, is a software intended to assist in developing and running of role-playing games. It does not allow the game to be played entirely within the computer. Such software assist in the drawing of maps, player character and non-player character creation, generation of monsters, and provision of dice rolls and their results. The software may be specific to a single role playing game system, or flexible enough to be applied to multiple game models.

== Software ==
Year	Title	Developer	Publisher	Setting	Platform	Notes
1981	The Imperial Data Recovery System		FASA	Traveller		
1985	Dragonfire II: The Dungeonmaster's Assistant	Erik Brynjolfsson, Steven Bergstein	Magicware	Various	Apple, Commodore, IBM Personal Computer	
1988	Character Creator		SandBar Software			
1988	AD&D Dungeon Masters Assistant Volume I: Encounters		SSI			
1989	AD&D Dungeon Masters Assistant Volume II: Characters & Treasures		SSI			
1993	Campaign Cartographer: Dungeon Designer; City Designer	ProFantasy Software		Various	Microsoft Windows	
1996	Advanced Dungeons & Dragons CD-ROM Core Rules					
1996	TableMaster					
2000	PCGen	Bryan McRoberts et al.		Various	Cross platform	Won gold at the 2005 ENnies for Best Electronic Product.
2002	D&D e-Tools: Character and Monster Generator	Code Monkey Publishing		Various	Microsoft Windows	
2002	AutoREALM	Andy Gryc		Various	Microsoft Windows	
2003	TOS+ (The Only Sheet Plus)	The Only Sheet		Fantasy	Microsoft Windows	
2004	Fantasy Grounds	SmiteWorks		Various	Microsoft Windows, Mac OSX, Linux	
2007	D&D Insider		Wizards of the Coast			
2007	Virtual Table beta		Wizards of the Coast			Promised feature for D&D Insider. Canceled in 2012
2012	Roll20	The Orr Group		Various	Website, mobile app	
2019	Black Cat DMs Familiar	D. Halliday		D&D 5E	Microsoft Windows	freeware
2020	Forgotten Maps			D&D 5E	Website, Mobile	freeware
2020	Foundry VTT	Foundry Gaming LLC		Various	Self-Hosted Web Application	
