= Worshipping Small Gods =

2007 collection of fantasy short stories by Richard Parks

- Cover of first edition
- Author: Richard Parks
- Cover artist: Garry Nurrish
- Language: English
- Genre: Fantasy
- Publisher: Prime Books
- Publication date: 2007
- Publication place: United States
- Media type: Print (paperback)
- Pages: 249
- ISBN: 0-8095-5745-2
- OCLC: 144685470

Worshipping Small Gods is a collection of fantasy short stories by American writer Richard Parks. It was first published in trade paperback by Prime Books in January 2007, with a hardcover edition following from the same publisher in May of the same year.

== Summary ==
The book collects fourteen novelettes and short stories by the author, three original to the collection. They vary by setting, with two tales set in classical Greece, four in the legendary Far East, four in a near-future Mississippi, two in generic fantasy worlds, and two in modern urban venues. They include the first of his Yamada no Goji stories ("Foxtails"), four of his "Eli Mothersbaugh" stories ("A Hint of Jasmine," "Voices in an Empty Room," "Hanagan's Kiyomatsu, 1923," and "Diva"), and the first in his "Laws of Power" series ("A Time for Heroes").

== Contents ==
- "Kallisti" (from Realms of Fantasy, v. 8, no. 4, Apr. 2002) - A look behind the Trojan War from the perspectives of Paris and the goddess Eris.
- "The Penultimate Riddle" (from Realms of Fantasy, v. 11, no. 6, Aug. 2005) - What kind of man, other than a hero, seeks out a riddling, carnivorous sphinx?
- "Yamabushi" (from Realms of Fantasy, v. 10, no. 2, Dec. 2003) - Retired warrior Minamoto no Enyo is tormented by a tengu who mistakes him for a monk.
- "Worshipping Small Gods" (from Realms of Fantasy, v. 9, no. 6, Aug. 2003) - A contest of wills between a Buddhist saint and a mountain god who only wants to be left alone.
- "The Plum Blossom Lantern" (from Lady Churchill's Rosebud Wristlet, no. 12, Jun. 2003) - The ghost of Yoshitomo no Michiko, now a night demon, seeks her human lover Fujiwara no Hiroi, but is opposed by a monk seeking to preserve Hiroi's life.
- "Foxtails" (from Realms of Fantasy, v. 11 no. 5, Jun. 2005) - Yamada no Goji, a demon hunter of Heian period Japan, undertakes to recover the son of a client and a fox spirit passing as human, the former apparently kidnapped by the latter.
- "A Hint of Jasmine" (from Asimov's Science Fiction, v. 28 no. 8, Aug. 2004) - High-tech ghost hunter Eli Mothersbaugh is commissioned to solve a mystery involving the ghosts of Water Oaks Plantation.
- "Voices in an Empty Room" (from Haunted Holidays, Oct. 2004) - Eli Mothersbaugh investigates the ghostly mystery behind a terrorist attack that rocked the town of Canemill, Mississippi.
- "Hanagan's Kiyomatsu, 1923" - A rare Japanese print has been destroyed by the ghost of its late owner; Eli must discover why.
- "Diva" - Eli is asked to exorcise a ghost of an opera singer haunting a college auditorium. But should he?
- "A Time for Heroes" (from The Shimmering Door, Aug. 1996) - Timon the Black, reviled as an evil magician, has kidnapped Princess Ashesa of Morushe, prompting her betrothed, Prince Daras of Borasur, to mount a rescue. But who is the real villain, and the real hero?
- "Death, the Devil, and the Lady in White" (from Realms of Fantasy, v. 11, no. 4 Apr. 2005) - John Alby of Tunby, like many others, loves the Lady in White, a fatal spirit. Can he free her from her curse and win her, or is he but a pawn of powers with different agendas?
- "The Right God" (from Realms of Fantasy, v. 10, no. 6, Aug. 2004) - Traditional religions have been disrupted by new gods manifesting all over the world. Don Lang finds himself drafted as prophet by Rockball, one of these new deities. But how can he fulfill his mission when neither of them even knows what kind of god Rockball is?
- "Wizard of Wasted Time" - Depressed ex-judge Leon Matson becomes involved in the lives of a bag lady and a homeless alcoholic who swears he is a wizard.

== Reception ==
Reviewer Don D'Ammassa writes "The quality of the stories is consistently high throughout and evidence that no matter how moribund novel length fantasy may be, the shorter form continues to be lively and inventive." He notes he "had previously read most of the stories in this collection in Realms of Fantasy magazine, and several of them felt like old friends revisited." Most of the stories are commented on individually, with the basis in classic and Asian mythology of many noted. "The Penultimate Riddle" is rated "one of his best," and "Fox Tails," in which "[g]hosts and other mysteries abound ... a somewhat darker story than most of the others in the collection." As further evidence Parks is not "a one note author," D'Ammassa cites the four Eli Mothersbaugh tales, noting their "contemporary settings and a much more somber tone ... closer to horror fiction, [though] the approach is more matter of fact and there is little actual menace, though certainly considerable mystery. ... I liked 'A Hint of Jasmine' and 'Diva' the best of these."

Publishers Weekly finds the collection "outstanding," in which "Parks blends wry wit and profound insight with myths and folklore from around the globe. ... Blurring the lines between science fiction, fantasy, horror and spiritual speculation, this compilation of 14 magical and supernatural tales is as entertaining as it is edifying." It singles out "The Plum Blossom Lantern," the title story, and "Voices in an Empty Room" as particularly noteworthy.

The St. Louis Post-Dispatch echoes Publishers Weekly, also describing Worshipping Small Gods as a "blend(ing) wry wit and profound insight with myths and folklore from around the globe."

Charles de Lint in The Magazine of Fantasy & Science Fiction wrote "No matter how outlandish the setting of the story, or how other from us his characters appear, Parks always manages to convince us of the humanity that lies at their hearts and has us care for them ... we should appreciate the diversity and skill he brings to the page and just be glad that there still are writers who have so many different things to say, with so many unexpected settings and characters."

Ray Olson in Booklist called the collection's "stories ... mostly darker than Parks' ever-so-appealing Hereafter, and After (2007)," but like in that "they are mythologically based and all about gods and heroes, demons and angels, and spells and hauntings," concluding that "[s]ome may think that Parks dilutes irreverence, uncanny chills, and eldritch humor with sentiment and psychological realism. Many more will rejoice that his work has so much heart." His assessment of individual pieces: "'Kallisti' compellingly interprets the Judgment of Paris and what happened to the shepherd prince thereafter in terms of individual erotic psychology." "Several stories seize on Japanese supernatural themes to marvelously humane effect; perhaps 'Yamabushi,' about the duel between a tengu, a demon of temptation, and a dissillusioned samurai who sure seems to the tengu to be a solitary monk, is the most delicious of a ravishingly bittersweet lot." "Four stories feature benevolent ghostbuster Eli Mothersbaugh of Canemill, Mississippi, and are so fine, sensitive, and southern that Eudora Welty might approve of them." "The ironically titled 'A Time for Heroes' is the legend of how a rueful wizard bloodily shortcircuits a war because knighthood’s flower has wilted."

The collection was also reviewed by Paul Witcover in Realms of Fantasy issue 78, August 2007, and Richard Larson in Strange Horizons, 7 April 7, 2008.
