= The Heavenly Fox =

Book by Richard Parks

- Cover of first edition
- Author: Richard Parks
- Cover artist: Ben Baldwin
- Language: English
- Genre: Fantasy
- Publisher: PS Publishing
- Publication date: 2011
- Publication place: United Kingdom
- Media type: Print (hardcover)
- Pages: 73
- ISBN: 978-1-84863-149-6
- OCLC: 760083556

The Heavenly Fox is a fantasy novella by Richard Parks. It was first published in hardcover by PS Publishing in February 2011. A subsequent ebook edition appeared in October 2013. It was nominated for the 2012 Mythopoeic Fantasy Award for Adult Literature.

== Summary ==
By stealing the chi of humans a fox spirit may survive one thousand years, at which age it may achieve true immortality. The fox vixen Springshadow has nearly attained that prize, taking the guise of a beautiful girl down the centuries and using the life force of her lovers. None took any permanent harm from it, but her latest lover, Zou Xiaofan, is deathly ill, and by demanding she "prove" her love for him at such a time forces her to choose between her immortality and his life. While fond of him in her own way, for Springshadow there is really only one choice. She makes it, and he dies.

Now immortal, Springshadow finds herself dissatisfied, plagued by a vague sense of regret she fears may blossom into an actual conscience. Traveling to Heaven, she quickly finds it unsatisfactory, better than but otherwise little different from Earth. She locates and converses with Sunflash, another immortal fox, and learns that he too failed to find contentment and is preparing to give up his status. He has only waited as long as he has in order to pass to the next fox to achieve immortality (her) his insight into its secret; that it is, in fact, worthless, and that true advancement can only come by returning to the wheel of rebirth.

A message from her dead lover's shade conveyed to her by Guan Shi Yin, goddess of mercy, convinces Springfox she might exorcize her inconvenient feelings by redeeming Zou Xiaofan's soul. By means of Heaven's efficient bureaucracy she discovers it is located in the Hell of Hungry Ghosts, to which she travels in the company of her longtime friend Wildeye, a Daoist reprobate who has also achieved immortality. Enlisting the aid of the demons there by bribing them with liquor, they finally locate Zou Xiaofan and with the aid of Guan Shi Yin free him from the torment to which he has mistakenly condemned himself.

After resolving this unfinished business, Springfox comes to her own conclusion on the secret of immortality.

== Reception ==
Charles de Lint in The Magazine of Fantasy & Science Fiction compares the author's work to that of Thomas Burnett Swann, as "[t]hey share a similar sensibility in how they approach the figures of myth and folklore: the otherworldly beings are down-to-earth — sometimes even lusty — but they never lose their magical sense of wonder." He calls the book "a delight from start to finish: fresh, with a charming cast of characters, and the kind of prose that is both immediate and timeless. In other words. Parks has delivered another winner that I can shelve in the keepers section of my library — right alongside my Thomas Burnett Swann books like The Goat without Horns and Moondust."

The book was also reviewed by Stephen Theaker in Theaker's Quarterly Fiction #37, Summer 2011.

== Relation to Other Works ==
Parks also uses supernatural foxes in other fantasies, particularly in a Japanese context in his short story "Lord Goji's Wedding" (2005), his novella Little Fire and Fog (2019) and his Yamada no Goji stories "Foxtails" (2005) and "The Ghost of Shinoda Forest" (2011) (collected in Yamada Monogatari: Demon Hunter (2013), and "Three Little Foxes" (2012) and "The Fox's Daughter" (2021) (collected in Yamada Monogatari: Troubled Spirits (2022), and the novel Yamada Monogatari: The War God's Son (2015). Another instance in a Chinese context is in his Pan Bao and Jing story "An Account of the Madness of the Magistrate, Chengdhu Village" (2018), and one in a non-oriental context is in his unconnected tale "A Road Once Traveled" (2009).

Guan Shi Yin also appears as a character in Parks's short stories "A Garden in Hell" (2006) and "The White Bone Fan" (2009), the latter of which is incorporated into the novel All the Gates of Hell (2013).
