= On the Banks of the River of Heaven =

2010 collection of fantasy short stories by Richard Parks

- Cover of first edition
- Author: Richard Parks
- Language: English
- Genre: Fantasy
- Publisher: Prime Books
- Publication date: 2010
- Publication place: United States
- Media type: Print (hardcover)
- Pages: 256 pp.
- ISBN: 978-1-60701-226-9
- OCLC: 642849305

On the Banks of the River of Heaven is a collection of fantasy short stories by Richard Parks. It was first published in hardcover by Prime Books in November 2010.

== Summary ==
The book collects fourteen novelettes and short stories by the author, four original to the collection, together with an introduction by Charles de Lint. It includes two of his tales of Somna's world, "Courting the Lady Scythe" and "The Man Who Carved Skulls," and the second of his Yamada no Goji stories, "Moon Viewing at Saijo Bridge."

== Contents ==
- "Introduction" (Charles de Lint)
- "On the Banks of the River of Heaven" (from Realms of Fantasy v. 14, no. 4, Apr. 2008) - Kaiboshi the Celestial Herdsman is separated from his wife Asago-hime the Divine Weaver by the River of Heaven, and something has been thwarting their annual reunion. It's up to his friend the Celestial Otter to save the day.
- "The Finer Points of Destruction" (from Fantasy Magazine no. 1, Dec. 2005) - Former divorce counselor Jack Kimble receives visitations from the Hindu goddess Kali, whose husband Shiva is avoiding her.
- "A Pinch of Salt" (from Mythic 2 Dec. 2006) - Makan the fisherman, son of a mermaid who abandoned her human family, is himself attracted to a mermaid, worrying his father Jal.
- "A Garden in Hell" (from Fantasy Magazine no. 5, Win. 2006) - Hiroi is tormented by a demon in Hell, yet Hell is an illusion to which he is self-condemned. To be released he must come to understand why he is there, a process he begins by creating a rock garden.
- "The Twa Corbies, Revisited" - A ghoul prince takes the guise of a knight out of a need to understand humanity.
- "Lord Goji's Wedding" (from Lady Churchill's Rosebud Wristlet no. 15, Jan. 2005) - An old monk tells those in his charge the story of Goji, a scholar whose marriage to a disguised fox spirit was thwarted by his Buddhist teacher. The young monks are left perplexed by the meaning of the tale and their master's connection to it.
- "The Feather Cloak" - The mountain monk Hakuryo surprises a trio of tennin (heavenly maidens) bathing, and seizes the feathered cloak of one to prevent her escape. But what, exactly, does he want from her?
- "Skin Deep" (from Eclipse Two: New Science Fiction and Fantasy, Oct. 2008) - Ceren, a young witch, has inherited several skins of transformation from her predecessor that allow her to become other people. But does she control the skins or do they control her?
- "Brillig" (from Jabberwocky 2, Jun. 2006) - An unreliable narrator reveals the demonic secret of a Lewis Carroll poem—or does he?
- "On the Wheel" - A scientific discovery gone wrong has remade the world into one in which metaphors become real. Thus Robert Matthews finds himself and the other members of his advertising firm transformed into rats, in a realization of the rat race trope. Who has brought this metaphor down on them, and how can he fix things?
- "Soft as Spider Silk" - Julan the Lucky gained a bride but lost his death on his quest against the Enchantress Widow. Now old but unaged, he returns to the scene of his triumph in hope of regaining his mortality.
- "Courting the Lady Scythe" (from Paper Cities: An Anthology of Urban Fantasy, Jan. 2008) - The youth Jassa has become enamored of the unattainable Lady Aserafel, his village's hereditary executioner. Guided by old stories, he seeks out an Aversa, one of the Firstborn of the goddess Somna, who grants him the gift of the Lady's love. The result is not at all what he expects.
- "The Man Who Carved Skulls" (from Weird Tales v.62, no. 2, Apr./May 2007) - Jarak carves the skulls of the dead, which serve as their memorials, and won his wife Letis by pledging to make hers the most magnificent carving ever on her decease. Now it appears he will predecease her, and she mourns her fate. Their son Akan, guided by a dream of the demonic Gahan the Destroyer, resolves the situation, but at a cost.
- "Moon Viewing at Shijo Bridge" (from Realms of Fantasy v. 12, no. 4, Apr. 2006) - Lord Yamada no Goji retrieves a purloined letter guarded by demons in order to redeem a former lover's reputation, only to see it result in her exile and suicide. While ultimately discrediting her enemies, he makes a devastating discovery about who really plotted her disgrace.

== Reception ==
Publishers Weekly characterizes the book as a "breezy collection" providing "provocative reflections on human nature," related "in a lyrical style that is sympathetic without being sentimental, straddling the boundary between the realistic and the romantic." The title story, described as "a delightful folktale meditation on the mysteries of love and friendship," is singled out for particular comment, as are "The Finer Points of Destruction" and "The Twa Corbies, Revisited."

Reviewer Don D'Ammassa calls the author "one of the few who consistently writes excellent fantasy at shorter length rather than ponderous novels," with "a light touch that makes his prose sparkle." That said, he feels this book "doesn’t quite measure up to his two previous collections that I’ve read, which probably contained the pick of his work," though he notes "there are several quite nice tales here including 'The Man Who Carved Skull[s],' 'The Twa Corbies Revisited,' and 'Moon Viewing at Shijo Bridge.'"

The collection was also reviewed by Faren Miller in Locus #599, December 2010.
