= Campaign Cartographer =

Example of a fantasy map generated using Campaign Cartographer.

Campaign Cartographer is a Windows map creation program created by ProFantasy Software originally in 1993.

== Description ==
The program was designed to draw maps for role playing and miniature war games. The CAD engine is based on FastCAD, although most of the code was written by the publishers. It includes a variety of add-ons for different genres, including fantasy, modern and science fiction. Campaign Cartographer 3 was released on June 30, 2006 and has since been updated 9 times. There are currently 9 add-ons for Campaign Cartographer; 6 drawing add-ons that add tools, templates, symbol catalogs and 3 symbol set add-ons consisting of thousands of symbols. Campaign Cartographer has been used to illustrate novels such as Shades of Gray by Lisanne Norman, Le Temple Des Eaux-Mortes by Eric Ferris and Johannes Cabal the Detective by Jonathan L. Howard. The Forgotten Realms Interactive Atlas, published by TSR, Inc. in 1999, was likewise constructed using Campaign Cartographer.

=== Add-ons ===
The following are commercial add-ons available for the Campaign Cartographer tool.

City Designer	This set is used to draw settlements. It includes approximately 2000 symbols and several drawing tools for buildings and streets.
Dungeon Designer	This is used to draw corridors, caves and rooms of dungeon maps. It adds about 1,000 symbols for fantasy, modern and science fiction genres.
Character Artist Pro	Used to create portraits of characters for role-playing games.
Dioramas Pro	Creates terrain and props that can be used to create three-dimensional models.
Cosmographer	Creates plans for science fiction games, including interstellar space, planetary systems, planets and starport plans for a game set in space. It can create linked multideck drawings of starships.
Perspectives Pro	Creates 3D isometric views of floorplans.
Symbol Sets	These four sets add additional symbols.

== Reception ==
In the September 1994 edition of Dragon (Issue 209), Lester W. Smith found Campaign Cartographer almost too good, and the 334-page manual almost too much, saying "For those who like to invest multiple hours into creating detailed maps for their campaigns, and who have the hardware to take advantage of the program, the Campaign Cartographer software allows them to create, store, modify, and copy maps more beautiful than they could have hoped before. But for GMs with limited time to spend, the program may just be too much." However, Smith concluded that too much program was better than too little program, and gave this an above average rating of 5 out of 6, saying, "The Campaign Cartographer software is sort of like a limousine of mapping programs, and some people might be better served with a rough-and-ready truck. On the other hand, this limousine isn't that expensive, and playing with its multitude of 'buttons' and 'switches' is a lot of fun."

In the December 1995 edition of Arcane (Issue 1), Andy Butcher reviewed both Campaign Cartographer and its add-on Dungeon Designer:

- Butcher admired Campaign Cartographer, giving it an above average rating of 8 out of 10 and saying, "Campaign Cartographer is an incredible program. It really does make it easy to create highly detailed maps of anything from a planet to a small forest."
- He was even more enthusiastic about Dungeon Designer, giving it an excellent rating of 9 out of 10 and commenting, "Considering how often these kind of maps are needed in most games, this makes Dungeon Designer even more useful than Campaign Cartographer for most gamers, which is high praise indeed."

Two issues later, in the February 1996 edition of Arcane (Issue 3), Butcher gave the add-on City Designer an average rating of 7 out of 10, saying "If you're lucky enough to [have access to your computer during your game] then City Designer's very handy indeed. On the other hand, if all you want to do is create maps to print out, Dungeon Designer is far more useful overall."

Andy Butcher reviewed Campaign Cartographer Pro for Arcane magazine, rating it an 8 out of 10 overall, and stated that "Campaign Cartographer Pro makes an already powerful program not only more flexible, but more importantly a whole lot easier to use. It's still not instantly accessible, but it is a lot quicker. Even if you only rarely use Campaign Cartographer, this comes highly recommended." Butcher reviewed Campaign Cartographer Perspectives in the same issue of Arcane magazine, rating it a 7 out of 10 overall, and stated that "There [...] comes a point when you begin to think that ProFantasy should just release a new version of Campaign Cartographer, with the features of the expansions built in. At the moment, if you bought the basic program and all the add-ons, you'd be looking at spending [a lot]. Still, yet another neat little addition to the program."

Michael Tresca writing for AllGame called Campaign Cartographer 2 "the best in its class." He also reviewed, Character Artist, an add-on for Campaign Cartographer 2, it was called essential for those who can't recruit an artist.

In a review of Campaign Cartographer 3 in Black Gate, M Harold Page said "Ultimately, Campaign Cartographer does require putting in some effort, but for map design, the results are rewarding and learning the software is not a bad way of spending a rainy Scottish afternoon."

== Reviews ==
- Shadis #14
- Shadis #24 (Feb., 1996)
- Rollespilsmagasinet Fønix (Danish) (Issue 11 - Dec/Jan 1995)
- Envoyer #2
- Australian Realms #25
- Realms of Fantasy

== See also ==
- AutoREALM
- List of role-playing game software
