= Yamada Monogatari: The Emperor in Shadow =

2016 novel by Richard Parks

- Cover of first edition
- Author: Richard Parks
- Cover artist: Alegion
- Language: English
- Series: Yamada Monogatari (The Tale of Yamada)
- Genre: Fantasy
- Publisher: Prime Books
- Publication date: 2016
- Publication place: United States
- Media type: Print (paperback)
- Pages: 335 pp.
- ISBN: 978-1-60701-473-7
- OCLC: 942710320
- Preceded by: Yamada Monogatari: The War God's Son
- Followed by: Yamada Monogatari: Troubled Spirits

Yamada Monogatari: The Emperor in Shadow is a historical fantasy novel by Richard Parks, the fourth volume in his Yamada Monogatari series featuring his sword and sorcery character Yamada no Goji. It was first published in trade paperback and ebook by Prime Books in September 2016. A subsequent audiobook edition was issued by Audible.

== Summary ==
Protagonist Yamada no Goji is a minor nobleman of Heian period Japan, who aided by his associate, the lapsed Buddhist priest Kenji, investigates supernatural mysteries as a demon hunter.

As a result of his successful defense of Minamoto no Yoshii from assassination by magic, Lord Yamada has received his own estate in Kamakura, and has devoted his attention to restoring the fortunes of his previously disgraced clan. He is called back into public affairs by his patron Prince Kanemore to escort Princess Tagako back to the capital from her sinecure as head of a provincial temple. Secretly, he is also tasked with protecting her from supernatural threats aimed at destabilizing the regime of the new emperor, Sanjō.

Yamada and Kenji have their work cut out for them as the attempts on the princess's life escalate with every effort to trace the source of the plot—and Prince Kanemore has mysteriously disappeared.
