= AutoREALM =

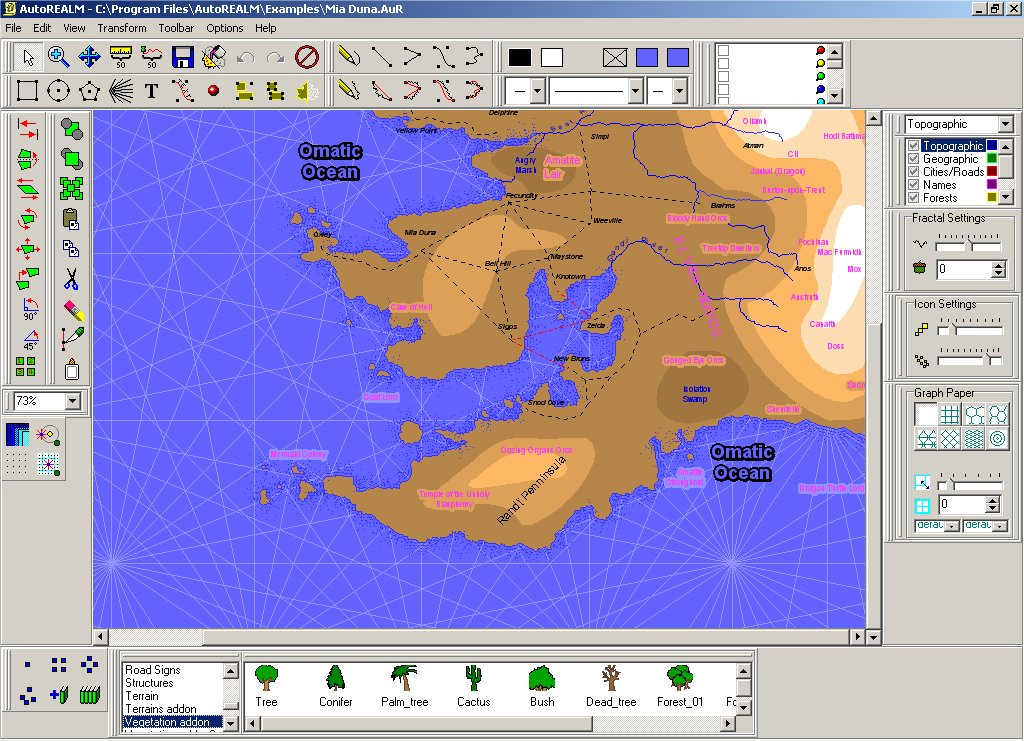
- AutoREALM main window
- Developer: Andy Gryc
- Stable release: 2.21 / March 16, 2006; 19 years ago
- Preview release: alpha 3.0.4 / May 10, 2016; 9 years ago
- Written in: C++, Delphi/Kylix
- Operating system: Microsoft Windows
- Type: Graphics / mapping
- License: GNU GPL
- Website: autorealm.sourceforge.net

AutoREALM is an open source program designed to draw maps for role-playing games, mainly in fantasy settings. The program is similar to the commercial Campaign Cartographer.

AutoREALM, in its 2.x series, is primarily written in Delphi and only works in Windows and Wine. Work is underway to recode the GUI to use wxWidgets and extending the support to Linux, FreeBSD and Mac OS X.

The program is a vector art program that supports various graphics layers. The program supports various kinds of grids and measurement methods. It supports drawing vector objects with both straight and fractal lines, and has various line styles. It also supports grouping of objects into map symbols that are arranged in a symbol library. The library shipping with the program includes various symbols from contributors.

The program also has some other modules, such as AutoNAME, a name generator based on context-free grammars.

== See also ==
- Campaign Cartographer
- List of role-playing game software
