= Story City, Iowa =

- City
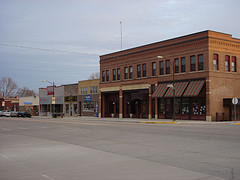
- Downtown Story City

- Location of Story City, Iowa
- Coordinates: 42°11′13″N 93°35′09″W
- Country: United States
- State: Iowa
- County: Story
- Incorporated: December 12, 1881

Area
  - Total: 2.75 sq mi (7.13 km^{2})
  - Land: 2.75 sq mi (7.12 km^{2})
  - Water: 0.0039 sq mi (0.01 km^{2})
- Elevation: 968 ft (295 m)

Population (2020)
  - Total: 3,352
  - Density: 1,219.1/sq mi (470.68/km^{2})
- Time zone: UTC-6 (CST)
  - Summer (DST): UTC-5 (CDT)
- ZIP code: 50248
- Area code: 515
- FIPS code: 19-75675
- GNIS feature ID: 2395976
- Website: cityofstorycity.org

Story City is a city in Story County, Iowa. It is located within the Ames, Iowa Metropolitan Statistical Area which envelops Story County and combined with the Boone, Iowa Micropolitan Statistical Area makes up the larger Ames-Boone, Iowa Combined Statistical Area. The population was 3,352 in the 2020 census, a slight increase from 3,228 in 2000.

== History ==
Story City was known as Fairview throughout much of its early history. The named changed in 1881 when the town established a post office and discovered that the Fairview name was already in use for another town. Story City was renamed after Supreme Court Justice Joseph Story. The boundaries of "Old Fairview" are outlined by signs during Scandinavian Days, and is approximately in the northeast corner of current Story City with the southern boundary being Broad Street.

Story City was laid out including Fairview in 1878, and officially incorporated in 1881. The railroad arrived in 1878 and connected the city to Ames by the narrow-gauge Des Moines & Minnesota and to Des Moines via the Chicago and North Western Railroad in Ames.

The city has deep historic and cultural ties to the Scandinavian countries of Denmark, Sweden, and mostly Norway. A large contingent of the city's population is descended from a major immigration of people from Nordic countries in the 1840s through 1860s. It is evident in the large number of Lutheran churches in the community with ministers historically delivering sermons in different languages (Swedish, Danish, and Norwegian) respective of the makeup of their congregations.

== Geography ==
According to the United States Census Bureau, the city has a total area of 2.80 square miles (7.25 km^{2}) which is all land.

== Demographics ==
Historical population
| Census | Pop. | Note | %± |
|---|---|---|---|
| 1880 | 331 | | — |
| 1890 | 536 | | 61.9% |
| 1900 | 1,197 | | 123.3% |
| 1910 | 1,387 | | 15.9% |
| 1920 | 1,591 | | 14.7% |
| 1930 | 1,434 | | −9.9% |
| 1940 | 1,479 | | 3.1% |
| 1950 | 1,545 | | 4.5% |
| 1960 | 1,773 | | 14.8% |
| 1970 | 2,104 | | 18.7% |
| 1980 | 2,762 | | 31.3% |
| 1990 | 2,959 | | 7.1% |
| 2000 | 3,228 | | 9.1% |
| 2010 | 3,431 | | 6.3% |
| 2020 | 3,352 | | −2.3% |
U.S. Decennial Census

=== 2020 census ===
As of the 2020 census, there were 3,352 people, 1,484 households, and 882 families residing in the city. The population density was 1,219.1 inhabitants per square mile (470.7/km^{2}), and there were 1,611 housing units at an average density of 585.9 per square mile (226.2/km^{2}). The median age was 45.7 years, and 20.7% of residents were under the age of 18. 22.6% of residents were under the age of 20; 4.3% were between the ages of 20 and 24; 22.0% were from 25 to 44; 25.4% were from 45 to 64; and 25.7% were 65 years of age or older. For every 100 females, there were 92.6 males, and for every 100 females age 18 and over there were 91.7 males age 18 and over. The gender makeup of the city was 48.1% male and 51.9% female.

Of the 1,484 households, 26.1% had children under the age of 18 living with them, 48.0% were married-couple households, 4.9% were cohabitating-couple households, 27.6% had a female householder with no spouse or partner present, and 19.5% had a male householder with no spouse or partner present. 40.6% of households were non-families, 36.1% were made up of individuals, and 20.6% had someone living alone who was 65 years of age or older.

0.0% of residents lived in urban areas, while 100.0% lived in rural areas. Of the 1,611 housing units, 7.9% were vacant; the homeowner vacancy rate was 2.1% and the rental vacancy rate was 8.5%.

Racial composition as of the 2020 census
| Race | Number | Percent |
|---|---|---|
| White | 3,117 | 93.0% |
| Black or African American | 27 | 0.8% |
| American Indian and Alaska Native | 13 | 0.4% |
| Asian | 22 | 0.7% |
| Native Hawaiian and Other Pacific Islander | 0 | 0.0% |
| Some other race | 42 | 1.3% |
| Two or more races | 131 | 3.9% |
| Hispanic or Latino (of any race) | 109 | 3.3% |

=== 2010 census ===
As of the census of 2010, there were 3,431 people, 1,472 households, and 895 families residing in the city. The population density was 1,225.4 inhabitants per square mile (473.1/km^{2}). There were 1,586 housing units at an average density of 566.4 per square mile (218.7/km^{2}). The racial makeup of the city was 97.2% White, 0.3% African American, 0.1% Native American, 0.4% Asian, 1.3% from other races, and 0.7% from two or more races. Hispanic or Latino of any race were 3.1% of the population.

There were 1,472 households, of which 28.3% had children under the age of 18 living with them, 50.3% were married couples living together, 8.1% had a female householder with no husband present, 2.4% had a male householder with no wife present, and 39.2% were non-families. 34.2% of all households were made up of individuals, and 19.3% had someone living alone who was 65 years of age or older. The average household size was 2.23 and the average family size was 2.86.

The median age in the city was 44.4 years. 22.7% of residents were under the age of 18; 6.1% were between the ages of 18 and 24; 22% were from 25 to 44; 26.3% were from 45 to 64; and 23% were 65 years of age or older. The gender makeup of the city was 46.5% male and 53.5% female.

=== 2000 census ===
As of the census of 2000, there were 3,228 people, 1,321 households, and 816 families residing in the city. The population density was 1,334.1 inhabitants per square mile (515.1/km^{2}). There were 1,377 housing units at an average density of 569.1 per square mile (219.7/km^{2}). The racial makeup of the city was 98.76% White, 0.28% African American, 0.19% Native American, 0.37% Asian, 0.12% from other races, and 0.28% from two or more races. Hispanic or Latino of any race were 0.43% of the population.

There were 1,321 households, out of which 30.7% had children under the age of 18 living with them, 52.9% were married couples living together, 6.5% had a female householder with no husband present, and 38.2% were non-families. 35.0% of all households were made up of individuals, and 19.4% had someone living alone who was 65 years of age or older. The average household size was 2.27 and the average family size was 2.97.

23.5% are under the age of 18, 6.7% from 18 to 24, 25.1% from 25 to 44, 20.0% from 45 to 64, and 24.8% are 65 years of age or older. The median age was 42 years. For every 100 females, there were 84.2 males. For every 100 females age 18 and over, there were 76.5 males.

As of 2000 the median income for a household in the city was $41,275, and the median income for a family was $51,493. Males had a median income of $33,500 versus $21,161 for females. The per capita income for the city was $20,345. About 3.9% of families and 6.4% of the population were below the poverty line, including 3.7% of those under age 18 and 9.0% of those age 65 or over.

== Geography and landmarks ==
Story City is located in central Iowa on Interstate 35, 45 minutes north of Des Moines and 10 minutes north of Ames which is home to Iowa State University. Industrial parks, shopping malls, and several restaurants are located on the interstate, with a historic downtown located less than two miles west of I-35.

Bethany Life Communities, American Packaging, Eby, and Innovative Lighting are major employers in Story City.

The Story Theatre/Grand Opera House is the oldest continuously operating theater in the Midwest and is listed on the National Register of Historic Places. In addition to showing movies, the theater features productions by Story City's Judge Story's Theatrical Troupe during Scandinavian Days in the summer and the annual Yulefest Celebration in the winter.

Story City is home to a 1913 Herschell-Spillman antique carousel. It is open at noon daily from Memorial Day to Labor Day.

The Story City Park is situated along the banks of the Skunk River, one of Iowa's recreational water trails. It is the starting point for the Skunk River Canoe Trail. City Park is home to a historic swinging bridge, constructed in 1936 under President Franklin D. Roosevelt's Works Progress Administration program; it was damaged by ice in March 2019.

The Skunk River Greenbelt Trail system begins just south of Story City, immediately off Interstate 35 on County Road E-18.

Story City has a nine-hole River Bend Golf Course featuring 2,980 yards of golf from the longest tees for a par of 37. The course rating is 34.3 and it has a slope rating of 117 on bluegrass. Designed by Charles Calhoun, the River Bend golf course opened in 1971.

Story City is located at the western boundary of the Silos & Smokestacks National Heritage Area.

== Arts and culture ==
Story City features an annual Scandinavian Days celebration. Beginning in 1965, the event occurs in the first week of June, and features live music with a beer garden, rides, and games. Participants find themselves in an immersion of Nordic culture in the form of food and arts. An annual storytelling festival, STORY! Celebrating the Art of Storytelling, is also held each September.

One of many of the city's prominent Lutheran Churches

Area churches include the following: Immanuel Lutheran Church (LCMC), St. Petri Lutheran Church (ELCA), Harvest Evangelical Free Church, Grace United Methodist Church, Church of Christ, Church of Jesus Christ of Latter Day Saints, St. Peter and Paul's Catholic Church (Located 7 miles southwest of Story City). Riverside Bible Camp is located 2 miles north of Story City.

The Nordic traditions of the community are evident in some of ethnic foods of the area. Popular and frequently served food items around Story City include:

- Kumla, potato dumpling made from finely cut potatoes mixed with flour, and typically served with boiled ham, ham broth, and plenty of butter.
- Lutefisk
- Kringle
- Lefse
- Krumkake
- Rosettes

== Education ==
The Roland–Story Community School District operates public schools. The district was established on July 1, 1969, with the merger of the Roland and Story City school districts.

Story City is the home of the Roland–Story Senior High School. Roland–Story High School's athletic teams are known as Norsemen and participate in Heart of Iowa conference and Iowa High School Athletic Association level 2A sports.

== Media ==
Print media: Story City Herald - weekly newspaper

Digital media: The Rocket - digital media and streaming audio

Radio: KHOI KHJJ

== Notable people ==
- Donald Evenson, biologist and chemist
- Zach Nunn, U.S. representative for Iowa
- Rich Olive, former Iowa State Senator
- Lars Pearson, publisher / editor-in-chief, Mad Norwegian Press (2011 Hugo Award winner)
- Marlene Perez, author
- Hank Severeid (1891–1968) Major League Baseball catcher
- Chris Taylor (1950–1979) bronze medal winner for freestyle wrestling in the 1972 Summer Olympics
- The band Radio Moscow was formed in the city.

== Popular culture ==
Bill Willingham's 2012 graphic novel Fable: Werewolves of the Heartland is set entirely in Story City.
