= Advanced Dungeons & Dragons CD-ROM Core Rules =

Computer program accessory for Dungeons & Dragons

- Original authors: TSR, Inc., Wizards of the Coast
- Developers: Evermore Entertainment, Inc.
- Release: 1996
- Final release: 2.0 / August 1999
- Operating system: Microsoft Windows 3.1/95 (1.0 version), Windows 98 (2.0 version)
- Type: Role-playing game accessory

Advanced Dungeons & Dragons CD-ROM Core Rules is computer program designed as an accessory for the Dungeons & Dragons fantasy role-playing game, originally published in 1996 and updated in 1999.

== Publication history ==
The Advanced Dungeons & Dragons CD-ROM Core Rules was published by TSR. TSR funded a start-up, Evermore Entertainment, to produce the product, with Victor Penman as Project Manager. As the title suggests, it was released as a CD-ROM for PC only.

In 1999, Wizards of the Coast released a new CD-ROM titled Advanced Dungeons & Dragons: Core Rules 2.0.

== Contents ==
The AD&D CD-ROM Core Rules contains several rulebooks in both Rich Text Format and as Windows Help files, including the Dungeon Master's Guide, Player's Handbook, Monstrous Manual, Tome of Magic, and Arms and Equipment Guide. It also includes a book covering Key Topics with a summary of the main AD&D rules, as well as a booklet of Instructions which explains how to use everything else. Hypertext links have been added to each of the main entries and rulings. The set also includes extra features, including the character generator, and tools to allow updates to characters created with the generator, as well as tools to enter the information for characters that were created manually. It also includes tools to generate non-player characters, handouts, random treasure, monsters, encounters, and maps.

The 2.0 version added for inclusion Dungeon Master Option: High-Level Campaigns, Player's Option: Combat & Tactics, Player's Option: Skills & Powers, and Player's Option: Spells & Magic.

== Business impact ==
The original 1996 release of the Core Rules resulted in unhappiness with TSR from retail stores that stocked the product. The product's release date was in mid-1996, and at the time, the computer supplies store Babbage's was undergoing severe financial difficulties that would result in their bankruptcy and liquidation proceedings by late 1996. TSR and Babbage's had arranged a large order of around 10,000-30,000 copies at the start of 1996, when the financial situation of Babbage's was less obviously dire. TSR elected to ship the order to Babbage's anyway, despite the fact many of its mall stores were moving to sell all remaining inventory and close. The deeply discounted copies of the Core Rules at Babbage's tanked the overall market, as rather than pay the suggested retail price, interested buyers could grab cheap copies from Babbage's. Other retailers would have to choose between discounting their own stock or seeing very slow sales. The incident weakened the remaining trust retailers had in TSR, making them hesitant to place large orders.

The reason why TSR pressed ahead with this shipment, despite warnings from its own employees, was due to a financial arrangement mid-90s TSR used known as "factoring". Factoring worked like this: TSR first arranged contracts with retailers to buy their products and offered a discounted rate for contracts signed in January. TSR then took these contracts to investment banks, and was advanced money immediately by the banks, with the banks to be paid off from the eventual sales of the product. This financial innovation allowed TSR to be essentially "paid in advance", less fees from the banks and from discounts given to suppliers. It had the key downside of not being flexible to changing market conditions, however, such as the news of Babbage's bankruptcy. TSR was forced into the choice of essentially paying out of pocket to the banks to undo the contract, or to ship anyway and comply with the contract terms. TSR itself was in grave financial difficulties in 1996, and unable to easily raise cash to take the option of renegotiating the arrangement, so they elected to proceed as normal, despite being destructive to sales in the long-term.

According to Jim Fallone, a director of sales and marketing at TSR, TSR's expenses in producing the product were "not recouped".

== Reception ==
Paul Pettengale reviewed the AD&D CD-ROM Core Rules for Arcane magazine, rating it a 5 out of 10 overall. He began the review by speaking about how many books are needed to run a game of AD&D, stating that "the prospect, then, of having all the main rulebooks on a CD-ROM is rather appealing, providing, of course, you've got a PC handy when you're playing your session. Few Dungeon Masters play with a PC on the gaming table [...] which seems to be a fundamental flaw with the whole premise of the Core Rules disc". He found that "the text is very easy to read, being presented in a large enough text size to make it clearly visible even on smaller monitors. Naturally, you can print the books [...] and sections of each". Pettengale found the books "relatively easy to navigate, thanks to the hypertext links" but noted that there's no search feature, in which, in his words, was a "massive disappointment; because of the size of the files, it can take an age of scrolling to find precisely what you're after, even where hypertext links have been included. [...] This is a clumsy way of finding information, and TSR could have made it a lot easier". He also found that "another omission, which is perhaps inevitable given the format that the text has been presented in, is that there are no pictures in the books at all. This is fine, more or less, as far as the DMG, PHB and Tome of Magic are concerned, but illustrations are extremely useful when it comes to describing monsters that appear in the MM, and the Arms and Equipment book states right at the beginning that everything in it is illustrated, when in fact this is quite clearly not the case [...] Because of the lack of illustration, it has to be said that the rulebooks as they are presented here on CD-ROM can be used as no more than an addition to the paper versions. If you've only got the CD-ROM, you're going to have a hard time running AD&D". Pettengale looked at "the other features that the disc offers for added worth" noting that the extra features are "primarily designed to make a DM's life easier" such as the character generator which he found to be "an extremely fast way of rolling up a PC - the whole process, including proficiency choices and the purchase of equipment, can take as little as ten minutes (when done using the basic books, the creation of a 1st level character can usually take as long as two hours, so that's a big time saver). All of the dice rolling options are presented, so there's plenty of flexibility built in, though there's no way that you can 'cheat' - most DMs will let a player reroll a dice or two throughout the character generation process, especially if a Hit Points roll turns out to be a 1. Nevertheless, this is a very handy feature and, providing you don't use the excellent Skills and Powers sub-rules [...] which aren't included as an option [...] it will probably be used time and again". He also commented on the DM tool to quickly create NPCs: "I suggest you use this only for creating 'general' NPCs if you've got a major, long-standing villain to create, it's best to do it yourself" and the map builder tool which "sounds more interesting than it actually is - the maps you create with it look pretty poor". Pettengale concluded the review by saying: "Overall, I'm not terribly impressed with the AD&D CD-ROM Core Rules. It had a lot of potential, but that potential hasn't really been capitalised on. There could have been splendid illustrations of all the monsters included, but this is not the case; there should have been a search feature for locating rulings in a hurry, but this isn't the case either. Yes, some of the tools are jolly useful, but they aren't the kind of things you can do yourself with pen and paper and a bit of time. I can see myself using it, though only occasionally [...] So, buy it if you've got money to burn, but this is not an essential purchase for all PC-owning DMs by any means".

In a review of Advanced Dungeons & Dragons CD-ROM Core Rules for Pyramid #22 (November/December 1996), the reviewer described the product as "an amazing achievement - easy to use, thorough, complete and incredibly useful".

AllGame reviewed version 2.0 and gave it a rating of 3.5 out of 5. They wrote: "Having the cash equivalent of over $100 worth of game books on a CD makes it worth the investment, especially for players who enjoy making their own house rules. But, it falls short of the incredible potential a Dungeon Master's program can provide."

== Reviews ==
- Shadis #30 (1996)
- SF Site
- Pyramid (2.0)
- Rollespilsmagasinet Fønix (Danish) (issue #15 - Feb 1997)
- Envoyer (German) (issue #1 - Nov 1996)
- InQuest Gamer #43
- Casus Belli #98
- Casus Belli #117
- Coleção Dragão Brasil
- Realms of Fantasy
