= Donald Evenson =

American biologist and chemist (1940–2025)

- Evenson in 1996
- Born: Donald Paul Evenson; October 30, 1940; Story City, Iowa, U.S.
- Died: March 20, 2025 (aged 84); Tucson, Arizona, U.S.
- Education: Augustana College; University of Colorado Boulder
- Occupations: Biologist, chemist

Donald Paul Evenson (October 30, 1940 – March 20, 2025) was an American biologist and chemist.

== Life and career ==
Evenson was born in Story City, Iowa, the son of Harold and Mildred Evenson. He attended Augustana College, earning his BA degree in biology and chemistry in 1964. He also attended the University of Colorado Boulder, earning his PhD degree in cell and molecular biology in 1968, which after earning his degrees, he worked as a postdoctoral fellow at Florida State University.

Evenson served as a professor in the department of biology and microbiology at South Dakota State University from 1983 to 2006. During his years as a professor, in 1996, he was named a distinguished professor.

== Death ==
Evenson died on March 20, 2025, in Brookings, South Dakota, at the age of 84.
