= Marlene Perez (writer) =

American writer

- Born: Story City, Iowa, U.S.
- Occupation: Writer
- Writing career
- Genre: Fiction

Marlene Perez is an American fiction writer for pre-teens and teens.

== Career ==
She was born in Story City, Iowa and now lives in southern California. Her debut novel about a girl dealing with having overly large breasts, Unexpected Development, was published in 2004. She wrote a teen fiction series which contains the books Dead is the New Black, Dead is a State of Mind, and Dead is so Last Year. Dead is Just a Rumor was published in April 2011 and Dead is Not an Option was published in July 2012. She is now writing the next two books in the series. She has also written Love in the Corner Pocket and The Comeback. Her books Bella Goes to Hollywood, Bright Lights for Bella (both part of the Star Sisterz series), and Figure in the Frost (part of the Knights of the Silver Dragon series) are written under the name Lana Perez.
