= Yamada Monogatari: Troubled Spirits =

2022 collection of short stories by Richard Parks

- Cover of first edition
- Author: Richard Parks
- Language: English
- Series: Yamada Monogatari (The Tale of Yamada)
- Genre: Fantasy
- Publisher: Canemill Publishing
- Publication date: 2022
- Publication place: United States
- Media type: Print (paperback), ebook
- Pages: 147
- ISBN: 979-836067347-7
- Preceded by: Yamada Monogatari: The Emperor in Shadow

Yamada Monogatari: Troubled Spirits is a collection of historical mystery fantasy short stories by Richard Parks, the fifth volume in a series featuring his sword and sorcery character Yamada no Goji, a hard-bitten investigator of supernatural mysteries, who plies his hand-to-mouth trade with the help of the lapsed Buddhist priest Kenji. It was first published in trade paperback and ebook form by Canemill Publishing in October 2022.

== Summary ==
The book collects eight novelettes and short stories by the author, two original to the collection, together with an introduction by the author.

== Contents ==
- "Introduction" - The author briefly notes the chronological relationships of the stories in the book to the novel preceding the collection.
- "The Tiger's Turn" (from Beneath Ceaseless Skies no. 79, Oct. 6, 2011) - the penurious Yamada is gifted with the revenue of a lucrative estate, provided he and his priestly sidekick Kenji can find out why its last few stewards have kept disappearing, and, in one instance, been murdered. As usual, the supernatural is involved.
- "The Sorrow of Rain" (from Beneath Ceaseless Skies no. 157, Oct. 2, 2014) - A Rain Spirit may be destroying a village's harvest—or the matter could be more complicated than that, hinging on a misunderstanding between the physical and spiritual worlds. It's up to Yamada to disentangle and mediate the situation.
- "Three Little Foxes" (from Beneath Ceaseless Skies no. 105, Oct. 4, 2021) - Yamada must determine why three Fox-Spirits are haunting a nobleman's garden, in another case based on a fundamental misunderstanding.
- "Uzumaki of the Lake" (from Beneath Ceaseless Skies no. 300, Mar. 26, 2020) - Yamada, newly prosperous and settled, still finds supernatural problems coming his way. In this one, a lake on the boundary of two domains is troubled by a ghost or water spirit that may or may not be causing a whirlpool to form in the midst of the water. The phenomenon turns out to be a spiritual warning against human foolishness that Yamada is able to puzzle out just in time.
- "A Minor Excorcism" (from Beneath Ceaseless Skies no. 313, Oct. 2020) - What should be a simple fix proves more complicated than expected.
- "The Ame Onna" - A brief, contemplative tale involving a different kind of rain spirit.
- "The Fox's Daughter" (from Beneath Ceaseless Skies no. 344, Dec. 2, 2021) - A fox spirit who is an old ally of Yamada calls in a favor, and he finds his household tasked with fostering a young fox/human hybrid. Difficulties abound at every turn, particularly when the "doggy" the girl befriends turns out to be a uniquely dangerous spirit.
- "Epilogue: One Rainy Day, with Spirits" - Yamada's daughter finds a new playmate, but there is something strange about the little girl she befriends.

== Relation to other works ==
The author notes in the introduction that first three stories occur before the events of the previous book, Yamada Monogatari: The Emperor in Shadow, while the remaining five stories occur after that novel, "when Lord Yamada is supposedly retired to his estate near Kamakura with his new wife."
