= Yamada Monogatari: To Break the Demon Gate =

2014 novel by Richard Parks

- Cover of first edition
- Author: Richard Parks
- Cover artist: Malte Zirbel
- Language: English
- Series: Yamada Monogatari (The Tale of Yamada)
- Genre: Fantasy
- Publisher: Prime Books
- Publication date: 2014
- Publication place: United States
- Media type: Print (paperback)
- Pages: 312
- ISBN: 978-1-60701-435-5
- OCLC: 892869931
- Preceded by: Yamada Monogatari: Demon Hunter
- Followed by: Yamada Monogatari: The War God's Son

Yamada Monogatari: To Break the Demon Gate is a historical fantasy novel by Richard Parks, the second volume in his Yamada Monogatari series featuring his sword and sorcery character Yamada no Goji. It was first published in simultaneous trade paperback and ebook form by Prime Books in November 2014, with the first hardcover edition, under the alternate title To Break the Demon Gate, published by PS Publishing the same month. A subsequent audiobook edition was issued by Audible in December of the same year.

== Summary ==
Minor nobleman Yamada no Goji, a demon hunter of Heian period Japan, is a hard-bitten private investigator of supernatural mysteries, who plies his hand-to-mouth trade with the help of a ghostly informant Seita and a drunken lapsed Buddhist priest named Kenji.

Yamada's former lover Teiko, wife of the previous emperor Suzaku and mother of current emperor Reizei's heir Takahito, enlists him to dispel malicious gossip undermining her position and ensure her son's succession to the throne. Partnered with Teiko's brother Prince Kanemore, Lord Yamada retrieves a purloined letter purported to prove her innocence, only to see it result in her disgrace, exile, and suicide.

Subsequently, Yamada succeeds in discrediting Teiko's enemy, Lord Fujiwara no Sentaro, and apparently safeguarding the succession, only to see the threat re-emerge in a new form. A seemingly reformed Sentaro has been installed at the head of a prominent monastery north of the capital, and a menacing spiritual pall gathers over the city that panics even its supernatural residents. People are dying in inexplicable ways, and Kanemore and Yamada are both convinced that Takahito's life is also in peril.

Complications ensue as Yamada's ghostly ally Seita vanishes, and he is approached by the beguiling Lady Snow, who holds out the possibility of clearing the name of his disgraced late father.

== Relation to other works ==
The novel incorporates Parks's earlier short story "Moon Viewing at Shijo Bridge," the short story as a whole forming the book's opening section and its closing lines the book's conclusion.

== Reception ==
Publishers Weekly calls the book a "superb supernatural page-turner" and "an absorbing and original tale," praising Parks for "creat[ing] a fascinating world" with "well-rounded, believable characters, and ... witty prose [that] maintains mystery and suspense throughout.
