= The Long Look =

2008 novel by Richard Parks

- Cover of first edition
- Author: Richard Parks
- Cover artist: Steven Gilberts
- Language: English
- Series: The Laws of Power
- Genre: Fantasy
- Publisher: Five Star
- Publication date: 2008
- Publication place: United States
- Media type: Print (hardcover)
- Pages: 297
- ISBN: 978-1-59414-704-3
- OCLC: 226984792
- Followed by: Black Kath's Daughter

The Long Look is a fantasy novel by Richard Parks, both his first novel and the first volume in his series The Laws of Power. It was first published in hardcover by Five Star in September 2008. It has appeared as an ebook in 2011 and a trade paperback in October 2018. The book placed twelfth in the 2009 Locus Poll Award for Best First Novel.

== Summary ==
Tymon the Black, known widely as an evil magician, is understandably misunderstood. He suffers the curse of "the long look," giving him glimpses of terrible futures that will inevitably come to pass unless he intervenes in the present. Haunted by the horrible consequences of inaction, he does what he must, ably assisted by his dwarfish assistant Seb. Alas, his interventions often affect innocent, or seemingly innocent, bystanders; some might also, if executed with insufficient finesse, result in outcomes even worse than those he sought to prevent. Hence his unenviable reputation.

Tymon's current intervention involves engineering the death of the headstrong glory-hound Prince Daras of Borasur, who will otherwise blunder his country and its neighbors into a devastating war. Casualties are his reluctant fiancé Princess Ashesa of Morushe, guilt-ridden over being the instrument of Daras's demise, and the prince's admiring younger brother Galan, now obsessed with vengeance. Between them they might well stir up troubles far worse than those Tymon has forestalled.

Unfortunately, the only solution is further meddling. A complicated sequence of events follows involving Ashesa, Galan, Seb, and many others, including the scheming Duke Laras, Laras's even more scheming henchman Vor, aged puppet-pretender to Borasur's throne Lord Molic, the servant Takren, who is more than he seems, the interfering goddess Amaet, a young man named Korik, who finds himself drafted as Tymon's apprentice, and a nameless fiend called up by Galan that needs to be banished.

== Relation to other works ==
The first two chapters of the book were originally published as the short story "A Time for Heroes" in the 1996 anthology The Shimmering Door, edited by Katharine Kerr and Martin H. Greenberg. The original story was later gathered together with two subsequent Tymon tales, "Empty Places" (2005) and "The Devil of Details" (2008) into Parks's 2017 collection The Collected Tymon the Black. A saying attributed to Tymon appears as a chapter heading in Black Kath's Daughter (2012), the next volume of "The Laws of Power," as do a number of quotations from "The Annals of Dommar the Beast," another character in The Long Look. Both are considered legendary historical personages by the time period in which Black Kath's Daughter is set. Tymon and his assistant Seb return as characters in Power's Shadow (2015) and The Seventh Law of Power (2025), the sequels to Black Kath's Daughter.

== Reception ==
Publishers Weekly calls the book an "amusing but thoughtful sword and sorcery novel" with "an exceptionally intelligent cast of characters. The tale doesn't overflow with crackling wit or moral complexity, but heroic fantasy fans will enjoy its clever tweaking of familiar clichés.

Don D'Ammassa writes "This is a fantasy novel that mixes adventure and mystery with an undercoating of wry humor. ... The story seems at times to be accelerating out of control but Parks keeps his hands firmly on the controls and brings it home safely. I found this to be thoroughly pleasant and refreshingly light."

Jackie Cassada in Library Journal considers the novel "equal parts dark comedy and fantasy adventure [that] should appeal to those who enjoy tales of derring-do that are ever so slightly off the beaten path."

Sally Estes in Booklist feels "Parks successfully conjures an evil magician with a difference ... at heart a kind, gentle man ... who suffer[s] the curse [of] the ability to see future horrors that will occur unless action is taken. ... The upshot is a tale of multidimensional characterizations that is long on action, often-hilarious humor, introspection on the nature of good and evil, and the relation between cause and effect." The book is rated as "[e]ntertaining fare with definite Y[oung] A[dult] appeal."

The novel was also reviewed by Faren Miller in Locus #572, September 2008, and Peter Heck in Asimov's Science Fiction, December 2009.
