= Yamada Monogatari: Demon Hunter =

2013 collection of short stories by Richard Parks

- Cover of first edition
- Author: Richard Parks
- Cover artist: Sherin Nicole, Glenn Porter
- Language: English
- Series: Yamada Monogatari (The Tale of Yamada)
- Genre: Fantasy
- Publisher: Prime Books
- Publication date: 2013
- Publication place: United States
- Media type: Print (paperback)
- Pages: 333 pp.
- ISBN: 978-1-60701-383-9
- OCLC: 816165849
- Followed by: Yamada Monogatari: To Break the Demon Gate

Yamada Monogatari: Demon Hunter is a collection of historical mystery fantasy short stories by Richard Parks, the first volume in a series featuring his sword and sorcery character Yamada no Goji. It was first published in simultaneous trade paperback and ebook form by Prime Books in January 2013.

== Summary ==
The book collects ten novelettes and short stories by the author, one original to the collection, together with an introduction by the author.

== Contents ==
- "Introduction" - The author provides information on the genesis and development of the series.
- "Fox Tails" (from Realms of Fantasy, v. 11 no. 5, Jun. 2005) - The protagonist, minor nobleman Yamada no Goji is introduced as a demon hunter of Heian period Japan, a hard-bitten private investigator of supernatural mysteries, who plies his hand-to-mouth trade with the help of a demonic informant and a drunken lapsed Buddhist priest named Kenji. Here he undertakes to recover the son of a client, apparently kidnapped by his disaffected wife, who has been revealed a fox spirit in disguise.
- "Moon Viewing at Shijo Bridge" (from Realms of Fantasy v. 12, no. 4, Apr. 2006) - Yamada's former lover Teiko, wife of the previous emperor Suzaku and mother of current emperor Reizei's heir Takahito, enlists him to dispel malicious gossip undermining her position and ensure her son's succession to the throne. Partnered with Teiko's brother Prince Kanemore, Lord Yamada retrieves a purloined letter purported to prove her innocence, only to see it result in her disgrace, exile, and suicide. Ultimately, Yamada succeeds in discrediting her Fujiwara clan enemies and safeguarding the succession, but is devastated to discover Teiko had plotted the whole scenario, including her own death. He seeks refuge in saké.
- "A Touch of Hell" (from Realms of Fantasy no. 76, Apr. 2007) - An ogre has closed an important road after apparently slaying the wife of a local official. Yamada and Kenji, now under the patronage of Prince Kanemore and acting as his agents, must get rid of the monster.
- "Hot Water" (from Realms of Fantasy, Dec. 2007) - On a rest cure at a monastery mandated by Kanemore to cure Yamada's drinking problem, the latter looks into why a mountain goddess is sabotaging the baths fed by a local hot spring.
- "The River of Three Crossings" (from Realms of Fantasy, Feb. 2009) - a provincial governor has ended a famous bandit's reign of terror, but the bandit's ghost keeps reappearing, to the detriment of the governor's reputation. Yamada and Kenji are hired to banish the spirit.
- "The Bride Doll" - An uneasy peace with the northern barbarians is threatened by the disappearance of the bride doll that allows the dead son of a tribal chieftain to rest in peace. Yamada and Kenji are sent to locate the item, a mission complicated by the presence of a snow demon.
- "The Mansion of Bones" (from Beneath Ceaseless Skies no. 19, Jun. 2009) - Yamada undertakes to recover a treasure from a ruined estate protected by murderous ghosts.
- "Sanji's Demon" (from Beneath Ceaseless Skies nos. 38–39, Mar. 2010) - Yamada is enlisted to help a famous demon queller find and recover a stolen heirloom, the stuffed corpse of a demon killed by the ancestral founder of his clan.
- "Lady of the Ghost Willow" (from Beneath Ceaseless Skies no. 53, Oct. 2010) - A Fujiwara noble hires Yamada to banish a spirit haunting his best friend to death, which has already proven impervious to exorcism.
- "The Ghost of Shinoda Forest" (from Beneath Ceaseless Skies no. 63, Feb. 2011) - Kenji informs Yamada that Princess Teiko's ghost has been seen haunting Shinoda Forest. The haunting proves a trap laid for them and Prince Kanemore by their enemies.

== Relation to other works ==
Parks later integrated "Moon Viewing at Shijo Bridge," the second story in the collection, into his first novel of Yamada no Goji, Yamada Monogatari: To Break the Demon Gate; the story as a whole forming the novel's opening section and its closing lines the novel's conclusion.

== Reception ==
Reviewer Don D'Ammassa, noting the appeal oriental fantasies have for him, "perhaps in part because there are relatively few of them," finds their combination with Richard Parks, "one of the few consistent and relatively prolific writers of short fantasy fiction," a convincing reason to buy the book. He describes the protagonist as "a kind of Elric figure, ... [b]ut where Elric was a simple character who occasionally gave vent to his guilty angst but showed few other emotions, Yamada is much more fully drawn over the course of the ten stories included here." He rates the stories "quite good and despite some superficial similarities quite varied as well. It's very hard to do this kind of story well at short length, but Parks carries it off again and again." He feels "[t]he first two [stories] plus 'Sanji's Demon' ... probably the strongest in the collection."
