= FastCAD =

FastCAD (and EasyCAD, a 2D-only subset) a computer-aided design (CAD) program for MS-DOS and Windows. It is also the basis for the map-drawing software Campaign Cartographer. It uses the file format extension FCW for its files.

The FastCAD release version 7, is a full professional tool, including 3D modeling and rendering, symbol definition editing, and the capability to work with multiple drawings and overlays. FastCAD is written in x86 assembly language and runs well on basic hardware.

FastCAD was written by Mike Riddle, the author of Interact for the Marinchip 9900 released in 1979, one of the first CAD programs to run on a personal computer (PC). In time, Interact became the architectural basis for early versions of AutoCAD.
