= Forgotten Realms Interactive Atlas =

Role-playing game software aid

Forgotten Realms Interactive Atlas is a computer program developed by ProFantasy Software and published in 1999 by TSR (by then an imprint of Wizards of the Coast) that generates a map of the Forgotten Realms, for use with the second edition of the fantasy role-playing game Advanced Dungeons & Dragons (AD&D).

== Description ==
Forgotten Realms Interactive Atlas is an atlas that depicts the entire fictional planet of Abeir-Toril, setting of the Forgotten Realms campaign setting. The program starts by showing a global map of the whole planet. The gamemaster can then click on hot points to bring up maps of regions, cities, buildings, and dungeons. Once the gamemaster finds the desired locale, they can edit it or use it as is. The gamemaster can then print out a map for the players that excludes hidden details, as well as a copy for themselves that includes all the information. Statistics are compliant with the rules for the second edition of AD&D.

== Development ==
The Forgotten Realms Interactive Atlas, published by TSR/WotC in September 1999, was constructed by ProFantasy Software using Campaign Cartographer.

The developers created vector versions of many previously published maps from the Forgotten Realms campaign setting and added many new maps, including several hundred more made available via three updates. The application, which was designed for the second edition of AD&D, was discontinued after the third edition of D&D was released by WotC in 2000.

== Reception ==
In Issue 19 of the French games magazine Backstab, Thomas Féron was not pleased with the program, pointing out, "It starts badly... At first, we believe it's going to be beautiful, precise, fluid. Wait, what's this? Gray Windows frame and these basic icons? Am I in Paintbrush or what? ... The maps allow you to zoom in on a street in the city, but each house is a beige cube on a brown background, if not red on green (ugh), with no detail." Féron concluded, "Frankly, if you want to have the 459 maps, go for it, but it's ugly and, as for the interactive aspect, it leaves you wanting more."

In the February 2000 edition of Realms of Fantasy, Eric Barker noted, "If you are a Forgotten Realms DM and particularly if you have copy of Campaign Cartographer but never seem to find the time to make any maps with it, then this is the package for you. With all these maps as a springboard, you can't help but make more interesting cities and dungeons."

In the February 2000 edition of the Argentinian magazine Xtreme PC, Pablo Barut commented "The most incredible thing about this program is that each section of this world is represented in maps with an extremely high level of complexity in which even the smallest details can be seen. All the places mentioned in the countless role-playing games based on this universe appear in this guide." Barut concluded, "there is no doubt that its creators have taken the trouble to make it as detailed as possible, although it goes without saying that this product is intended exclusively for the most fanatical role-players."

AllGame gave a rating of three out of five and wrote: "Forgotten Realms: Interactive Atlas is good tool for a Dungeon Master but it could have been better. The interface, although simple, could use some improvement. Also, a few sounds or 3D elements would have made the program much more interesting."
