= PCGen =

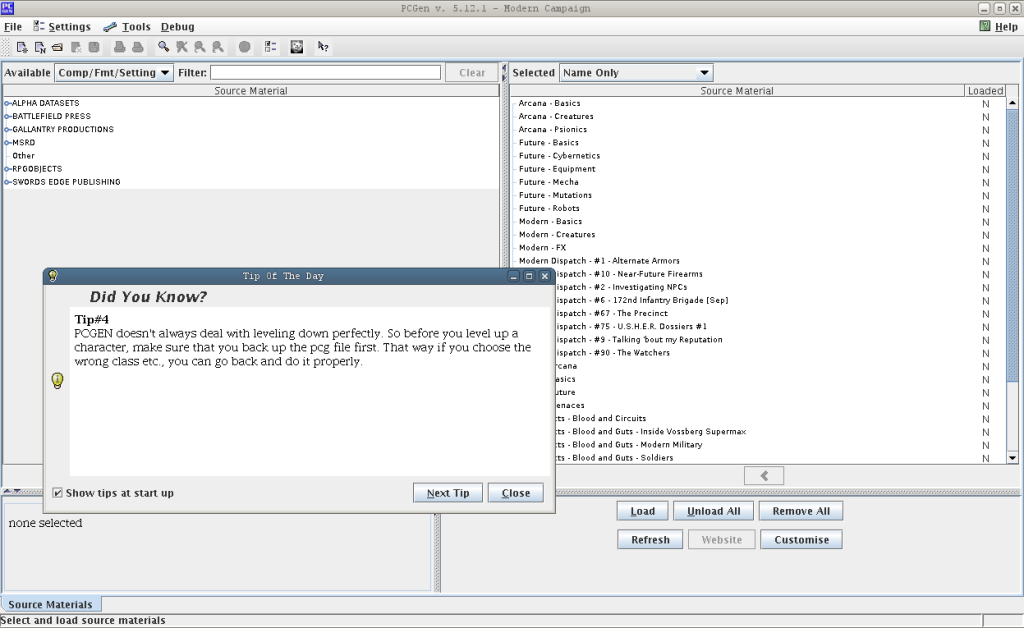
- Screenshot of PCGen running on Ubuntu Linux
- Developer: Bryan McRoberts et al.
- Stable release: 6.08.00RC10 / February 25, 2023; 3 years ago
- Preview release: 6.09.07 Pre-release / February 21, 2023; 3 years ago
- Operating system: Cross-platform
- Platform: Java
- Type: RPG playing aid
- License: LGPL software, Various, incl. OGL, for data
- Website: PCGen.org / PC-Gen.org (mirror)
- Repository: https://github.com/PCGen/pcgen

PCGen is a character creation and role-playing game playing aid program for d20 System-based games, such as Dungeons & Dragons.

The software is written in Java and runs on any system that supports Java 10.0.2 or later as of v6.07.09.

The program has won ENnies (EN World awards) at Gen Con twice; a bronze in 2003 for Best Resource/Fan Site and a gold in 2005 for Best Electronic Product.

== Features ==
The software allows players and DMs to create d20 System player characters, and subsequently maintain the character sheets in electronic format, tracking both the character statistics, their equipment and possessions, and other information related to the characters, making sure the characters are consistent with the d20 System rules.

All of the data the program uses, and all of the character data, is stored in plain text data files. Custom rules can be specified by writing new data files.

PCGen ships with a Data Set Converter that will assist in the conversion of user created data sets to the latest version of PCGen. This feature only works with data sets that are compatible with PCGen v5.14.1 or later.

The character sheets can also be exported in various kinds of XML, HTML, and PDF formats. For example, the software allows character data to be exported in datablock format similar to that used in pre-built adventures, or character sheet format similar to the official D&D character sheets.

== Licensing of data ==
Traditionally, the stumbling block with computerized RPG play aids has been the publisher's reluctance to allow their published rules to be redistributed in another form. However, the OGL, an "open-source-like" license created by Wizards of the Coast allows PCGen to include all of the material found in the System Reference Document as well as other related material. PCGen has also signed on to Paizo Publishing's Community Use Policy and the Pathfinder Roleplaying Game Compatibility License. Other, non-OGL content publishers have also allowed their content, under separate agreement, to be converted to PCGen format and included in data sets shipped with PCGen.

There have been a few license disputes; for example, while Wizards of the Coast did not want some of the source book data to be shipped with PCGen, they later allowed Code Monkey Publishing to work on commercial versions of the WotC book data sets. However, in late 2006 WotC did not renew CMP's license, which expired on November 30, 2006.

== See also ==
- List of role-playing game software
