= Four Horsemen, at Their Leisure =

Short story by Richard Parks

- Cover of first edition
- Author: Richard Parks
- Cover artist: Jon Foster
- Language: English
- Genre: Fantasy
- Publisher: Tor.com
- Publication date: 2011
- Publication place: United States
- Media type: ebook
- Pages: 32 pages
- ISBN: 978-1-4299-2634-8
- OCLC: 865171294

Four Horsemen, at Their Leisure is a fantasy short story by Richard Parks. It was first published in the online magazine Tor.com for April 21, 2010, with a subsequent stand-alone Tor ebook edition appearing February 1, 2011. It subsequently appeared in the e-anthology The Stories: Five Years of Original Fiction on Tor.com on July 15, 2013.

== Summary ==
The Apocalypse is done with, the Earth wiped clean of life, and only the Four Horsemen, Death, War, Pestilence, and Famine remain to bear witness. One day they come across the impossible—a living pine seedling. They ponder but fail to fathom this development, and all leave but Death, who remains, thinking. He finally realizes the divinity—the Consensus—must have made the tree, intending to restart the cycle of creation.

Addressing the Consensus, Death asks that the detached aspects of the divinity (the Horsemen and the Adversary, who suffers in Hell) be reabsorbed into it, their purposes having been fulfilled. Refused, he decides to resume his function, leading his brethren against the tree. To prevent them from killing it, the Consensus reabsorbs all the Horsemen but Death, who is consigned to his own pocket dimension.

As the dispute continues, the Consensus returns Death's brothers to him, and he realizes that the Horsemen and the Adversary remain separated because they are aspects of the divinity it doesn't want to admit are part of it. The Consensus concedes the point, stating that it hurts to "know the true nature of all that We are." Death, aware of the teaching value of pain, realizes that by avoiding such lessons the Consensus had doomed Creation from the start; its end was thus not mankind's failure, but that of the Consensus.

Belatedly, the Consensus agrees to reabsorb the Four Horsemen—but not the Adversary. Death refuses; it's all or nothing. The divinity withdraws to consider, leaving the Horsemen alone in the pocket dimension. Death suggests that until the Creator "wises up" they occupy their leisure in a group project—planting a tree.

== Relation to other works ==
The theme of the teaching power of pain is also explored by Parks in his earlier short story "Judgment Day" (2000), in which God is repeatedly questioned by his creations throughout the ages on why there is suffering, but not really knowing the answer is unable to provide an honest response. At the end, he himself asks the same question, receiving a surprising answer. It also comes up in his fantasies involving the bodhisattva Guan Shi Yin, including the short stories "A Garden in Hell" (2006) and "The White Bone Fan" (2009) and the novel All the Gates of Hell (2013).
