= Dragonfire II: The Dungeonmaster's Assistant =

1985 software

- Developers: Erik Brynjolfsson, Steven Bergstein
- Release: 1985
- Platform: Apple, Commodore, IBM Personal Computer

Dragonfire II: The Dungeonmaster's Assistant is a computer program published by Magicware for Apple, Commodore and IBM Personal Computers in 1985. The program, and its predecessor, were designed by Erik Brynjolfsson, who later became an MIT professor. Dragonfire II was written by Steven Bergstein, who worked for Magicware and Brynjolfsson at the time.

== Use ==
The program is designed to assist a game master in managing table-top role-playing games such as Dungeons & Dragons and Tunnels & Trolls, allowing the user to enter material into the menu-driven program's tables for encounters, treasure, and for generating monsters and characters. The software allowed users to customize templates, permitting them to modify the system so that it would generate characters, encounters and other game requirements for a multiple role playing systems.

== Development ==
Dragonfire II was designed by Erik Brynjolfsson and published by Magicware as a successor to the original Dragonfire. According to Brynjolfsson's curriculum vitae, the first program was published between September 1984 and August 1985, while Dragonfire II was published between August 1985 and November 1989 for Apple, Commodore and IBM personal computers.

The sequel was written in Turbo Pascal and was designed to operate more quickly than its predecessor. The IBM PC version featured a windowed interface with pull-down menus, while the Apple II and Commodore 64 versions offered a simpler interface due to differences in memory and data storage. Magicware attributed the higher price of the IBM version partly to these additional interface features.

== Reception ==
Reviewing an IBM PC-compatible beta version for Dragon in December 1986, Hartley and Pattie Lesser in "The Role of Computers" column praised the program's menu-driven interface and extensive customization options. They found it useful when running Advanced Dungeons & Dragons and Tunnels & Trolls, particularly because it reduced the amount of time spent consulting tables and performing calculations. However, they noted that the program could not automate every aspect of a role-playing game, requiring game masters to handle special monster attacks and surprise rolls themselves. The reviewers nevertheless strongly recommended the software. Another 1986 review, in Computer Gaming World #33, praised the software's utility, and described it as being the most flexible and thorough of the products that were available on the market at the time.

== See also ==
- List of role-playing game software
