= Yamada Monogatari: The War God's Son =

2015 novel by Richard Parks

- Cover of first edition
- Author: Richard Parks
- Cover artist: Alegion
- Language: English
- Series: Yamada Monogatari (The Tale of Yamada)
- Genre: Fantasy
- Publisher: Prime Books
- Publication date: 2015
- Publication place: United States
- Media type: Print (paperback)
- Pages: 333
- ISBN: 978-1-60701-457-7
- OCLC: 910530511
- Preceded by: Yamada Monogatari: To Break the Demon Gate
- Followed by: Yamada Monogatari: The Emperor in Shadow

Yamada Monogatari: The War God's Son is a historical fantasy novel by Richard Parks, the third volume in his Yamada Monogatari series featuring his sword and sorcery character Yamada no Goji. It was first published in trade paperback and ebook by Prime Books in October 2015. A subsequent audiobook edition was issued by Audible.

== Summary ==
Protagonist Yamada no Goji is a minor nobleman of Heian period Japan, who aided by his associate, the lapsed Buddhist priest Kenji, investigates supernatural mysteries as a demon hunter.

When Japan is threatened by the rebellious Abe clan, their patron Prince Kanemore recruits Yamada and Kenji into the war to protect the empire's brilliant military leader Minamoto no Yoshii from assassination by magic. Lord Yamada also faces a personal enemy, Lord Tenshin. Yamada and Kenji soon learn they face more than just mundane dangers, as both the Abe and Tenshin are employing shikigami, demons created out of paper and the souls of the departed.

== Reception ==
Publishers Weekly calls the book "[s]uspenseful and often thought-provoking," remarking that "[w]ith a refreshingly conversational narrative, Parks captures the different facets of Japanese mythology and visions of the supernatural. Lord Yamada is a complex and entertaining protagonist, and his personal battles, whether with demons or his relationships with women, are compelling. Parks creates a rich world, further proving that in this series, nothing is as it seems." The reviewer concludes that "Parks's work is a delight to read."
