= Mertwig's Maze =

1988 fantasy board game for 2–9 players

Mertwig's Maze is a fantasy board game for 2–9 players designed and illustrated by Tom Wham and published by TSR in 1988.

== Gameplay ==
In Mertwig's Maze, the players are royal heirs who need to prove their worthiness to ascend the throne by obtaining a royal treasure as well as a royal birthmark, and then defeating a final enemy.

=== Components ===
- Folded paper map (the main board)
- eight paper minor boards
- 190 event cards
- 100 die-cut counters
- cardstock storage folder
- one small ziplock storage bag

=== Setup ===
All players start in the town on the map, and equip themselves with weapons, magic and companions.

=== Objectives ===
A player must collect two items proving their royal heritage.

=== Gameplay ===
Players move into the wilderness, either randomly, or towards one of the seven minor boards, or as directed by an event card, in search of the necessary items. Combat with monsters results from encounter cards drawn. Players can also choose to attack each other in the hopes of gaining their royal items. If a character is killed in combat, the player starts with a new character the next turn.

=== Victory conditions ===
Once a player has collected two royal items, the player can go to the royal palace maze to confront the Mystic Musk-Ox. The player who defeats this final enemy wins the game.

== Reception ==
In the December 1988 edition of Space Gamer/Fantasy Gamer (No. 84), Richard Edwards commented that "all in all, this is a fun little beer and pretzels game for an hour or two of enjoyment. The humorous touches are up to Tom Wham's usual style and the rules are so well written and placed exactly where you need them (on the cards, on the boards). But though there are some decisions as to where to go and who to hire, most of the play is randomized in card draws and die rolls. While those gaming groups looking for a short diversion will enjoy a couple of games of Mertwig's Maze, it is unlikely to see much repeated use".

In the January 1989 edition of Games International (issue #2), James Wallis criticized the packaging, pointing out that the numerous components could not be stored in the supplied small ziplock bag. However, in terms of gameplay, he called designer Tom Wham "an excellent games designer". Wallis enjoyed the game, his only criticism being that "the final stage can drag on a little too long". He concluded by giving the game an excellent rating of 4.5 out of 5, saying that "it's really simple and a great deal of fun. The packaging lets it down, but it's extremely playable [...] Highly recommended".

== Reviews ==
- Dragon #144
