= Dungeon Master Option: High-Level Campaigns =

Tabletop role-playing game book for D&D

- Author: Skip Williams
- Genre: Role-playing game
- Publisher: TSR
- Publication date: 1995
- Media type: Print (Hardcover)
- Pages: 192

Dungeon Master Option: High-Level Campaigns is a supplemental sourcebook to the core rules of the 2nd edition Advanced Dungeons & Dragons (AD&D) fantasy role-playing game.

== Contents ==
High-Level Campaigns is supplement for the Dungeon Master divided into seven sections. The book begins by listing a set of principles in a section called "The Seven Maxims". After that is a section called "Adventures", which presents a mechanic to help the DM generate lands and creatures. The next section is "Spells and Magical Items" which explores the nature of high-level magical powers, including suggested limits for spells as well as magic items, while the section "Creating Magic Items" provides information for high-level wizards who want to create their own weapons and wands while the section "Magical Duels" includes a combat system centered on mages, in which wizards can fight each other in a magically generated world where they can use their most powerful magic for any purpose. The next section "True Dweomers" is an additional spell list, while the final section "High-level Characters" provides more abilities to give to powerful characters.

== Header ==
The book begins with a one-page foreword by Skip Williams. Chapter One (pages 6–29) explains the seven maxims for running high-level AD&D campaigns: Don't depend on the dice, Use adversaries intelligently and inventively, Control magic, Be aware of demographics, Think on an epic scale, Plan ahead, and Share responsibility with your players. Chapter Two (pages 30–67) provides advice on how to construct adventures. Chapter Three (pages 68–85) expands on the use of spells and magical items. Chapter Four (pages 86–95) presents a guide for spellcasting characters to create magical items. Chapter Five (pages 96–117) details how to conduct magical duels between spellcasters. Chapter Six (pages 118-141) details true dweomers, spells more powerful than those presented in the Player's Handbook. Chapter Seven (pages 142-179) details how to advance high-level player characters beyond 20th level. An appendix (pages 180-188) lists the statistics of spells usable in spell dueling. Pages 189-192 are an index to the book.

== Publication history ==
This 192-page book was published by TSR, Inc. in 1995. The book was designed by Skip Williams. The cover art is by Jeff Easley and interior art is by Eric Hotz, Ken Frank, and Stephan Peregrine.

== Reception ==
Trenton Webb reviewed Dungeon Master Option: High-level Campaigns for Arcane magazine, rating it a 4 out of 10 overall. Webb comments that "The AD&D system has a fundamental flaw: characters eventually become so potent that they can cope with anything the world (or alternative planes, or gods) can throw at them. High-level Campaigns seeks to remedy this, aiming to provide new inspiration and sensible controls for [...] high-level campaigns." He comments that the "Adventures" section is "an attempt to reinvigorate the level-challenged DM" and calls the "True Dweomers" section "the obligatory additional spell list, with more 'earth-shaking' magic", and suggests that the "High-level Characters" section "suggests extra abilities to give powerful people a truly heroic swagger". Webb concludes that "The Seven Maxims is the most essential section, though it contains little more than solid, common-sense rules that focus the minds of DMs and players", and that "Similar strong-but-simple ideas are crystallised in Magical Duels [which] is a complex but calculated system with unique spell-on-spell combat rules that make for invigorating battles." Webb contends that "The new powers in High-level Characters fall into two kinds: style and substance. The style side is great, helping PCs to develop nuances of character, but the abilities in the substance part are really trivial things that will be overlooked by referees, but that players will attempt to transform into life-saving skills." Referring to "The Seven Maxims", "Magical Duels", and "High-Level Characters" sections, he states that "These three good chapters constitute the majority of the book and are recommended reading. The other four chapters, however, fall into the trap of so many TSR supplements and guides; namely that rather than replacing or refining rules, ever more tables and lists are heaped on top of the old." Webb concludes his review by saying: "High-level Campaigns is of interest but by no means essential. The Seven Maxims could add clarity, and Magical Duels might add excitement. Essentially, though, High-level Campaigns is an ideal present for a referee friend. That way you can borrow it, check out the good bits, and avoid that sinking feeling of having paid £12 for another earnest AD&D debate and yet another spell list.

== Reviews ==
- Backstab #10
- Casus Belli #114
- Dragão Brasil #30
