= Hereafter, and After =

2007 novella by Richard Parks

- Cover of first edition
- Author: Richard Parks
- Cover artist: William T. Maud
- Language: English
- Genre: Fantasy
- Publisher: PS Publishing
- Publication date: 2007
- Publication place: United Kingdom
- Media type: Print (hardcover)
- Pages: v, 90
- ISBN: 978-1-904619-87-1
- OCLC: 71285686

Hereafter, and After is a fantasy novella by Richard Parks. It was first published in hardcover and trade paperback by PS Publishing in March 2007. A subsequent ebook edition appeared in October 2011. The print edition includes an introduction by Andy Duncan.

== Summary ==
Jake Hallman steps in front of a garbage truck, gets hit, and awakes on the Golden Road in the afterlife. The being greeting him (St. Brendan) at first appears to be Jesus ("You’ve got to be kidding," says Jake) and then an angel, and tells him every deceased person experiences the afterlife according to the expectations formed while alive. Most are incapable of leaving behind their preconceptions; Jake, evidently, is one of the rare "free souls" capable of change.

As such, Jake rejects Brendan's offer to escort him to Heaven, as well as the sales pitch of Brendan's demonic counterpart Mala in favor of Hell. Instead, having always fancied Norse mythology, he takes the rainbow bridge to Valhalla. At first finding it interesting, he eventually realizes its inhabitants are locked in an endless series of revels as they wearily await a Ragnarok that never comes. There Jake meets Freya (not the goddess), a Valkyrie who has also been having doubts about her native afterlife. Together the two undertake a quest on behalf of Odin to rescue the god's son Baldur from Hel, the Norse underworld.

Their quest fails; Hel, queen of Hel, refuses to release Baldur, while the latter, secretly in love with his captor, does not really want to leave. On their way back from the underworld, Jake and Freya inadvertently trigger Ragnarok when they encounter Sigyn and disrupt her age-old mission to relieve the suffering of her husband, the god Loki. The Twilight of the Gods plays then out in the manner foretold in myth, destroying the Norse cosmos. In the aftermath, Brendan and Mala, who had teamed up to monitor the situation, find themselves tapped to become the first human couple on the renewed Midgard, while Jake and Freya become deities.

In the course of the narrative a hydra-headed demiurge known as the Accountant keeps track of Jake and Freya's various revelations and shepherds them into their new roles.

== Relation to other works ==
The mission of Sigyn disrupted by the protagonists is explored by Parks in his earlier short story "The Trickster's Wife" (2001), in which it is revealed that Loki's spouse is actively thwarting the sequence of events leading to Ragnarok as an act of vengeance against both her husband and the other Norse deities.

== Reception ==
Ray Olson in Booklist characterizes the book as a "debonair, completely amusing take on immortality.

Charles de Lint in The Magazine of Fantasy & Science Fiction, notes that the author is "one of my favorite short form writers working today," and had wondered "if he’d still seem so fresh and innovative in a novel, where one needs to pick a style and stick with it at far greater length than a short story. ... With ... Hereafter, and After, we get a taste. It’s ... the longest piece I’ve seen from Parks to date and it certainly whets my appetite for that as-yet unpublished ... novel." He finds the plot "allows Parks to poke gentle fun and make some serious commentary on our belief systems, and it gives us a terrific read. Hereafter, and After is a story that would have made Robert Nathan or James Branch Cabell proud — and probably would James Morrow, too, who's still alive and could read it. And it certainly shows that Parks has the chops to work at a longer length.

The book was also reviewed by Rich Horton in Locus #556, May 2007.
