= TableMaster =

TableMaster is a computer program published by Wintertree Software in the US and FarPoint Technology in the UK as a play aid for role-playing games.

== Contents ==
TableMaster is a program to help construct and use tables to generate random results for a wide variety of games.

== Reception ==
James V. Trunzo reviewed TableMaster in White Wolf Inphobia #50 (Dec., 1994), rating it a 4 out of 5 and stated that "I'm having a lot of fun with TableMaster. Its uses as a table generator and game and are limited only by your imagination. I even dug up my ancient Boot Hill game and transferred tables into the computer. Some of Ms. McGuire's pregenerated tables are a kick.."

Andy Butcher reviewed TableMaster for Arcane magazine, rating it a 6 out of 10 overall. Butcher comments that "TableMaster has its uses, but it doesn't do anything that you can't do yourself with a handful of dice, and entering new tables, while simple, can be time consuming. For a tables-heavy system such as Rolemaster, TableMaster could be a great help. For simpler systems, though, it is limited to providing inspiration for flagging imaginations, which is where the ready-made tables come in handy."

== Reviews ==
- Shadis #16
