= Dragonlance (board game) =

Board game

Dragonlance is a fantasy board game published by TSR in 1988 that is based upon the fantasy role-playing campaign setting Dragonlance, also published by TSR.

== Contents ==
Dragonlance is a game for 2-6 players, in which each player uses their team of dragons to get into the forbidden tower and be the first to get the Dragonlance and return it to their home base.

=== Components ===
The board comes with a mounted hex grid map board. In the center is a plastic tower surrounded by six gates, each a different color. There are six dragon teams in six colors, as well as a large quantity of white plastic bases, used to indicate a dragon's altitude. There are also a deck of cards and several ten-sided dice.

=== Basic game ===
The active player rolls a ten-sided die for movement points, which can then be used to move forward, as well as to gain or lose altitude. As a dragon rises in altitude, a white plastic disk is placed under it for every movement point used to climb. These disks are removed as a dragon loses altitude. If a player rolls only a 1 or 2 for movement points, the player gains a magic card in compensation, which can be used when needed.

==== Combat ====
If a dragon ends its movement beside another dragon and at the same altitude, it can attack. Both players roll a die; the attacker adds +1 to their die roll for each movement point used that turn. The highest total wins, and the losing dragon is forced to reduce altitude, losing one white disk for each point of difference in the die rolls. If a dragon reaches the ground (loses all its white disks), it is out of the game.

==== Victory condition ====
Each player must fly one of their dragons through their gate (the gate that matches the color of their team), then gain altitude to fly to the top of the central tower (requiring ten altitude disks), where the dragon can grasp the Dragonlance. If the dragon is able to return the Dragonlance to its home base, the owning player wins the game.

=== Advanced game ===
The advanced games adds rules for leaders, who can give the dragon they are riding unique abilities; flying citadels which can hide powerful artifacts; aerial stunts; and optional rules for advanced movement and combat.

== Publication history ==
In the first ten years of Dungeons & Dragons, the de facto campaign universe was Gary Gygax's World of Greyhawk. In 1984, TSR published its second campaign setting, Dragonlance, created by Laura and Tracy Hickman, which proved to be very popular. In addition to a series of D&D modules, Tracy Hickman and Margaret Weis also created a series of novels. Other licensed products soon followed, including the Dragonlance board game. The game was designed by Michael Dobson, Scott Haring, and Warren Spector, and was released in 1988.

In 2022, Wizards of the Coast, who had taken over TSR 25 years before, released a new board game, Dragonlance: Warriors of Krynn, which was completely unrelated to the original board game.

== Reception ==
In Issue #2 of Games International, Richard Ashley was pleased by the low price, but not by much else. He had trouble constructing the central tower and the six gates, noting the pieces didn't fit properly. He also found that "two of the six dragon teams (bronze and gold) were virtually impossible to tell apart. I eventually marked one with a felt tip". In the Basic game, Ashley felt that it was all based on die rolls, saying that "in practice, the opening moves tend to be a bloodbath on the crowded board with those throwing high decimating those who throw low, giving little chance to catch up". He didn't find much improvement in the advanced rules, finding, for instance, that "the aerial stunts are a feeble attempt to give the illusion of 'dog-fights' but are dependent on throwing in powerful magic cards". He also found that high die rolls were necessary to win in the Advanced game. Ashley concluded by giving the game a poor rating of only 2 stars out of 5: "All in all, the game didn't live up to its potential. I feel the makers lost their way a bit and haven't produced a good fantasy or aerial combat game. [...] Only the relatively low price stopped me giving it one star".

Rick Swan pointed out that Dragonlance is simply a wargame "substituting magic wands and dragons for machine guns and Marines", but Swan didn't think the wargame-as-fantasy worked, saying "TSR's Dragonlance board game boiled down to a tactical air game, using flying dragons instead of Messerschmitts. Though well-designed war games of any type can be fun, fantasy board games invariably lack the sophisticated mechanics and historical resonance of military simulations, which makes me lose interest fast".

In a retrospective review, Matt Sall tried the game 34 years after its publication and was pleasantly surprised that he enjoyed it, concluding: "The Dragonlance board game is so much better than I expected! Most Dungeons & Dragons based board games are your typical dungeon crawlers. Not that there's anything wrong with that, but this is such a departure from that. [...] if you're into games like X-Wing and looking for something with a little different flavor, see if you can dig up a copy of Dragonlance".
