= The Ogre's Wife =

2002 collection of fantasy short stories by Richard Parks

- Cover of first edition
- Author: Richard Parks
- Language: English
- Genre: Fantasy
- Publisher: Obscura Press
- Publication date: 2002
- Publication place: United States
- Media type: Print (paperback)
- Pages: 270
- ISBN: 0-9659569-5-4
- OCLC: 51092016

The Ogre's Wife: Fairy Tales for Grownups is a collection of fantasy short stories by American writer Richard Parks. It was first published in trade paperback by Obscura Press in August 2002. A Kindle edition was issued in 2011, and a new trade paperback edition in September 2020. The collection was nominated for the 2003 World Fantasy Award for Best Collection; its title story won the SF Age Reader's Poll for short story in 1995.

== Summary ==
An "absolute treasure of a collection," the book collects fifteen novelettes and short stories by the author, one original to the collection, together with an introduction by Parke Godwin. It includes three of his "Eli Mothersbaugh" stories, "Wrecks," "The God of Children," and "A Respectful Silence." The Kindle edition also includes the author's notes on the stories in an appendix.

== Contents ==
- "Ghosts, Gods, a Dragon, Assorted Legends and Things That Go Bump in the Heart: An Introduction" (Parke Godwin)
- "The Ogre's Wife" (from Science Fiction Age, v. 3, no. 6, Sep. 1995) - Marybeth of Tumby, given as bride to an ogre in return for him sparing her village, must find some accommodation with her monstrous husband.
- "How Konti Scrounged the World" (from Realms of Fantasy, v. 6, no. 3, Feb. 2000) - Konti is the least of the gods, if he counts as a god at all. When the other deities take to making worlds, he wants one too, but, unable to create, has to beg bits of his compatriots' works to form his own. The result is unexpected.
- "The Beauty of Things Unseen" (from Quantum Speculative Fiction, 1999) - A fairy funeral is put off due to a disruption of the glamour that keeps the fairies' haven safe. The pooka Mordhu, whose funeral it was, is charged with finding and quelling the disruption before the ceremony can go forward.
- "Doing Time in the Wild Hunt" - Ray Wolver sees a white doe on his way to work, and later sees it again. He dreams of hunting it as one of a pack of dogs. Then the dream becomes reality, intertwined somehow with his increasingly distant relationship with his wife Mary Beth.
- "My Lord Teaser" (from Elf Magic, Oct. 1997) - John of Devonleigh—"Running Jack"—is indeed on the run. With his doom almost upon him, he is given a way out, passage to the land of the Sidhe to become the queen's lover—and the king's quarry. Only if he plays his role well, and carefully, might there be hope for him.
- "Doppels" (from Not of Woman Born, Mar. 1999) - Doppels are the coming thing in acting; artificial humans that adapt to mimic particular actors and take over for them when they're over the hill. All acting contracts now include a provision to get doppeled, as aging actor Kent Doolan has just discovered the hard way. So what's left for an obsolescent actor contractually bound to train his replacement?
- "Wrecks" (from Odyssey, issue 2, 1998) - High-tech ghost hunter Eli Mothersbaugh tries to bring peace to a ghost haunting a train station—and the ghost's living daughter.
- "The God of Children" (from Asimov's Science Fiction, v. 24, no. 12, Dec. 2000) - Eli Mothersbaugh is called in by his old friend Hiro Yamada, whose mother is haunted by an unusual spirit.
- "A Respectful Silence" (from Realms of Fantasy, v. 8, no. 2, Dec. 2001) - At an abandoned airfield, Eli assists a pilot's ghost in making her final report.
- "The Trickster's Wife" (from Realms of Fantasy, v. 7, no. 3, Feb. 2001) - Sigyn, engaged in her interminable task of catching the serpent's venom ever dripping on her bound husband Loki, is visited in turn by Hel, Odin, and the Norns, each of whom seems to want something from her.
- "A Place to Begin" (from Weird Tales, v. 57, no. 3, Spr. 2001) - Umi, a child with almost limitless potential, is bought by the sorceress White Willow, and set to simple tasks with simple prohibitions. Inevitably, she disobeys, seeing and understanding things she never did before.
- "Take a Long Step" (from Realms of Fantasy, v. 5, no. 4, Apr. 1999) - The lost shoe is a symptom; the wheel is turning, and Walker is becoming a god again, while Johnny Ray is becoming his opposite. Can it be stopped, or delayed?
- "Judgment Day" (from Realms of Fantasy, v. 7, no. 1, Oct. 2000) - God ruminates on his failures as Judgment Day approaches, and finally arrives—but it's not quite what he, or anyone, expects.
- "Borrowed Lives" (from Prom Night, May 1999) - Joshua Cullen buys a photograph of an unknown woman at a flea market, and, on a whim, uses it to replace that of his former wife. At once he finds himself with a different past, a different wife, and a different fate.
- "Golden Bell, Seven, and the Marquis of Zeng" (from Black Gate, v. 1, no. 1, Spr. 2000) - Seven, a young man of Zeng, falls in love from afar with Jia Jin, a concubine intended for sacrifice when the ruling Marquis dies. Desperate to save her, he seeks out Golden Bell, a lady of the Heavenly Court, for aid. All it will cost him is his heart and soul...
- "Appendix: Story Notes" (Kindle edition only)

== Reception ==
Parke Godwin called the book "one of the best SF/fantasy collections I've read in years" and wrote of Parks that "[l]ike any fine writer [he] doesn't label easily, which makes him hell for lazy-minded pigeonholers, but his themes are consistent and clear. He uses fantasy to underscore reality: the nature of our humanity and the inescapability of what we are, the choices we make and the price we pay for each, right or wrong. ... [H]e can step imperceptibly from deadpan funny to deeply affecting truth with an utterly transparent style that has the reader racing down the page [and] has the rare ability to say profound things simply."

Charles de Lint in The Magazine of Fantasy & Science Fiction wrote "Like the best storytellers, [Parks] goes where the tale takes him, and then proceeds to write that story as truthfully as possible."

Terry McGarry in the webzine Strange Horizons noted that "[d]iscovering Richard Parks's fiction is like discovering a wise Zen master pumping gas at a service station or a weathered swami slinging burgers at your favorite corner diner: transcendence in the midst of the ordinary, right where it ought to be."

Don D'Ammassa writes "[u]ntil I read this collection, I hadn't realized how many stories I had already read by Richard Parks, most of which I quite thoroughly enjoyed." He feels "[y]ou won't be wasting your time" on the book; "Parks' take on fantasy is sufficiently different to be worth noting." He describes the settings as "varied, including traditional fantasy worlds and contemporary locations," and the stories as "predominantly serious but often [with] humorous undertones. 'The God of Children' and 'A Place to Begin' were my two personal favorites."

In his Locus review, Nick Gevers praised the author as "a quiet, unpretentious storyteller whose work shrewdly inverts expectations, delivers wittily unpredictable homilies, and extracts with painful accuracy the dark experience and twisted emotion covertly underlying familiar, seemingly pellucid, folktale surfaces."

Paul Di Filippo in Asimov's Science Fiction wrote "[d]eceptively simple, earnest, and tragicomic, Parks's tales convey deep truths beneath narratives that tumble along like limpid streams. Whether exploring Oriental mythologies, or creating Dunsanyian wonderlands, Parks delivers stories that are rooted very tangibly in specific times and places, yet which are underpinned by eternal issues."

Paul Witcover in Realms of Fantasy noted that "Parks's characters may win their heart's desire, but their happiness is shaded by the mature wisdom that comes with sacrifice and loss."
