= Venger =

Venger may refer to:

- The Venger: Dead Man Rising, an American comic book series by Matthew Spatola
- Venger, a character in Dungeons & Dragons

== People with the surname ==
- Anders Venger (1872–1935), Norwegian politician of the Conservative Party
- Amund Venger (1943–2013), Norwegian politician for the Centre Party
