= Realms of Fantasy =

Defunct American speculative fiction magazine

- Categories: Fantasy fiction magazine
- Frequency: Bi-Monthly
- First issue: October 1994
- Final issue: October 2011
- Country: USA
- Language: English
- ISSN: 1078-1951

Realms of Fantasy was a professional bimonthly fantasy speculative fiction magazine published by Sovereign Media, then Tir Na Nog Press, and Damnation Books, which specialized in fantasy fiction (including some horror), related nonfiction (with particular interest in folklore) and art. The magazine published short stories by some of the genre's most popular and most prominent authors. Its original publisher was Sovereign Media, and it first launched with the October 1994 issue. It was headquartered in Herndon, Virginia.

On January 27, 2009, the magazine's managing editor under Sovereign Media announced that Realms of Fantasy would cease publication after the April 2009 issue. The closure was blamed on "plummeting newsstand sales, the problem currently faced by all of the fiction magazines."

In March 2009, SFScope reported that the magazine had been bought by Warren Lapine's Tir Na Nog Press and would not close. Publication restarted with a release date in July 2009, missing one issue (April 2009). The fiction editorial staff did not change.

Douglas Cohen was promoted to Editor in November 2009, and was previously Assistant (Fiction) Editor [May 2005], and had assumed roles of Nonfiction Editor and Art Director in March 2009. The headquarters was in San Jose, California.

Shawna McCarthy was and remained the fiction editor since the magazine's inception in 1994.

In October 2010, Lapine announced plans to shut down the magazine, with the final issue (December 2010) made available to subscribers online. However, a month later the magazine was sold to small press publisher Damnation Books, which resumed publication without a significant hiatus. In November 2011, William and Kim Gilchrist of Damnation Books LLC announced that publication of the magazine would end with the October 2011 issue.

== See also ==
- Science fiction magazine
- Fantasy fiction magazine
- Horror fiction magazine
