= Richard Parks (author) =

American novelist

- Born: June 15, 1955 (age 71); Newton, Mississippi, U.S.
- Occupation: Author
- Writing career
- Pen name: W. J. Everett
- Genres: Fantasy, science fiction
- Website: richard-parks.com

Billy Richard Parks (born June 15, 1955) is an American fantasy, science fiction and horror writer. He writes under the names Richard Parks and W. J. Everett, aside from a few early works written as by B. Richard Parks and Rick Parks.

== Biography ==
Parks is a native of Mississippi; he was born in Newton. As an adult, prior to his literary career, he was "a chemist by trade, specializing in paint and polymer films." More recently he resided in Ridgeland, Mississippi. He now lives in central New York with his wife and cats.

== Works ==
Parks "started writing seriously about 1976," collecting thirty-five rejections before his first professional sale ("The Passing," published in Amazing/Fantastic, v. 28, no. 1, July, 1981). His work since then has appeared in Asimov's Science Fiction, Beneath Ceaseless Skies, Fantasy Magazine, Realms of Fantasy, Tor.com, Weird Tales and other periodicals, as well as various anthologies. Early in his career "[h]is most popular recurring character [was] Eli Mothersbaugh, a high-tech ghost hunter based in the sleepy—and oft haunted—imaginary town of Canemill, Mississippi." Many of his fantasies with contemporary settings also make use of Canemill, and its name has been adopted for Canemill Publishing, an imprint through which Parks has issued a number of his books. More recently he has found success with his historical fantasies featuring Yamada no Goji, a demon hunter of Heian period Japan.

== Reception ==
Parke Godwin called Parks's first collection, The Ogre's Wife: Fairy Tales For Grownups (2002), "one of the best SF/fantasy collections I've read in years" and wrote of its author that "[l]ike any fine writer [he] doesn't label easily, which makes him hell for lazy-minded pigeonholers, but his themes are consistent and clear. He uses fantasy to underscore reality: the nature of our humanity and the inescapability of what we are, the choices we make and the price we pay for each, right or wrong. ... [H]e can step imperceptibly from deadpan funny to deeply affecting truth with an utterly transparent style that has the reader racing down the page [and] has the rare ability to say profound things simply."

Charles de Lint of The Magazine of Fantasy & Science Fiction praised Parks' "remarkable storytelling" in a voice that is, "sometimes lyrical, sometimes hard-edged; sometimes in a voice that sounds as ancient as the first stories told around our early ancestors' campfires; sometimes in a voice so new that we have yet to hear it."

== Recognition ==
Parks's story "The Ogre's Wife" won the SF Age Reader's Poll for short story in 1995. His writings have also received nominations for the World Fantasy Award and the Mythopoeic Award; more specifically, his collection The Ogre's Wife: Fairy Tales For Grownups (2002), described by one reviewer as an "absolute treasure of a collection," was nominated for the 2003 World Fantasy Award for Best Collection, and his novella The Heavenly Fox (2011) was nominated for the 2012 Mythopoeic Fantasy Award for Adult Literature.
