= Beyond the Fields We Know =

Collection of short fiction by Lord Dunsany

- Author: Lord Dunsany
- Cover artist: Gervasio Gallardo
- Language: English
- Series: Ballantine Adult Fantasy series
- Genre: Fantasy short stories
- Publisher: Ballantine Books
- Publication date: 1972
- Publication place: United States
- Media type: Print (paperback)
- Preceded by: Don Rodriguez: Chronicles of Shadow Valley
- Followed by: The Charwoman's Shadow

Beyond the Fields We Know is a collection of fantasy short stories by Irish writer Lord Dunsany, and edited by Lin Carter. The title is derived from a description of the location of the border of Elfland used over one hundred times in Lord Dunsany's best-known novel, The King of Elfland's Daughter. It was first published in paperback by Ballantine Books as the forty-seventh volume of its Ballantine Adult Fantasy series in May 1972. It was the series' fourth Dunsany volume, and the second collection of his shorter fantasies assembled by Carter.

Dunsany is considered a major influence on the works of J. R. R. Tolkien, H. P. Lovecraft, Ursula K. Le Guin, and others. Beyond the Fields We Know collects fifty-nine short pieces by the author, including stories, poems and a play, selected from some of his early collections. It incorporates the whole of his first book and collection The Gods of Pegāna (1905) and extended selections from his second, Time and the Gods (1906), and his poetry collection Fifty Poems (1929). An introduction and afterword by Carter frame the collection.

== Contents ==
- "Return to the World's Edge" (introduction by Lin Carter)
- The Gods of Pegāna
  - "Preface"
  - "The Gods of Pegāna"
  - "Of Skarl the Drummer"
  - "Of the Making of the Worlds"
  - "Of the Game of the Gods"
  - "The Chaunt of the Gods"
  - "The Sayings of Kib"
  - "Concerning Sish"
  - "The Sayings of Slid"
  - "The Deeds of Mung"
  - "The Chaunt of the Priests"
  - "The Sayings of Limpang-Tung"
  - "Of Yoharneth-Lahai"
  - "Of Roon, the God of Going"
  - "The Revolt of the Home Gods"
  - "Of Dorozhand"
  - "The Eye in the Waste"
  - "Of the Thing That Is Neither God Nor Beast"
  - "Yonath the Prophet"
  - "Yug the Prophet"
  - "Alhireth-Hotep the Prophet"
  - "Kabok the Prophet"
  - "Of the Calamity That Befel Yūn-Ilāra by the Sea, and of the Building of the Tower of the Ending of Days"
  - "Of How the Gods Whelmed Sidith"
  - "Of How Imbaun Became High Prophet in Aradec of All the Gods Save One"
  - "Of How Imbaun Met Zodrak"
  - "Pegāna"
  - "The Sayings of Imbaun"
  - "Of How Imbaun Spake of Death to the King"
  - "Of Ood"
  - "The River"
  - "The Bird of Doom and the End"
- Time and the Gods (selections)
  - "How Slid Made War against the Gods" (original title: "The Coming of the Sea")
  - "The Vengeance of Men"
  - "When the Gods Slept"
  - "For the Honour of the Gods"
  - "The Wisdom of Ord" (original title: "The South Wind")
  - "Night and Morning"
  - "The Secret of the Gods"
  - "The Relenting of Sarnidac"
  - "The Jest of the Gods"
  - "The Dreams of the Prophet"
- King Argimēnēs and the Unknown Warrior (play)
- Fifty Poems (selections)
  - "In the Sahara" (poem)
  - "Songs from an Evil Wood" (I and II only) (poems)
  - "The Riders" (poem)
  - "The Watchers" (poem)
  - "The Enchanted People" (poem)
  - "The Happy Isles" (poem)
  - "A Word in Season" (poem)
  - "The Quest" (poem)
- The Sword of Welleran and Other Stories (selections)
  - "The Kith of the Elf-Folk"
  - "The Sword of Welleran"
- A Dreamer's Tales (selections)
  - "The Madness of Andelsprutz"
  - "The Sword and the Idol"
- The Book of Wonder (selections)
  - "Miss Cubbidge and the Dragon of Romance"
  - "Chu-Bu and Sheemish"
  - "How Nuth Would Have Practised His Art upon the Gnoles"
- The Last Book of Wonder (selection)
  - "A Story of Land and Sea"
- "The Naming of Names: Notes on Lord Dunsany's Influence on Modern Fantasy Writers" (by Lin Carter)
