= Mythopoeia =

Narrative genre in modern literature and film

Mythopoeia (/ˌmɪθəˈpiːə/, Ancient Greek: μυθοποιία, romanized: muthopoiía, lit. 'myth-making'), or mythopoesis, is a subgenre of speculative fiction, and a theme in modern literature and film, where an artificial or fictionalized mythology is created by a writer of prose, poetry, or other literary forms. The concept was widely popularised by J. R. R. Tolkien in the 1930s, although it long predated him. The authors in this genre integrate traditional mythological themes and archetypes into fiction. Mythopoeia is also the act of creating a mythology.

== Genre ==
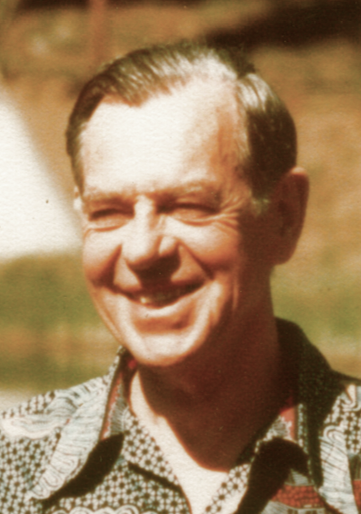
Joseph Campbell wrote about the role of created mythologies in the modern world.

The term mythopoeia comes from Hellenistic Greek muthopoiía (μυθοποιία), meaning 'myth-making'; an alternative is mythopoesis (μυθοποίησις) of similar meaning. The definition of mythopoeia as "a creating of myth" is first recorded from 1846. In early use, it meant the making of myths in ancient times.

While many literary works carry mythic themes, only a few approach the dense self-referentiality and purpose of mythopoesis. Mythopoeic authors include William Blake, H.P. Lovecraft, Lord Dunsany, J. R. R. Tolkien, C. S. Lewis, Mervyn Peake, and Robert E. Howard. Tolkien used the word as the title of one of his poems, written in 1931 and published in Tree and Leaf.

Works of mythopoeia are often categorized as fantasy or science fiction but fill a niche for mythology in the modern world, according to Joseph Campbell, a famous student of world mythology. Campbell spoke of a Nietzschean world which has today outlived much of the mythology of the past. He claimed that new myths must be created, but he believed that present culture is changing too rapidly for society to be completely described by any such mythological framework until a later age.

The philosopher Phillip Stambovsky argues that mythopoeia provides relief from the existential dread that comes with a rational world, and that it can serve as a way to link different cultures and societies.

Mythopoeia is sometimes called artificial mythology, which emphasizes that it did not evolve naturally and is an artifice comparable with artificial language, and therefore should not be taken seriously as mythology. For example, the noted folklorist Alan Dundes argued that "any novel cannot meet the cultural criteria of myth. A work of art, or artifice, cannot be said to be the narrative of a culture's sacred tradition...[it is] at most, artificial myth."

== In literature ==
=== Antecedents ===
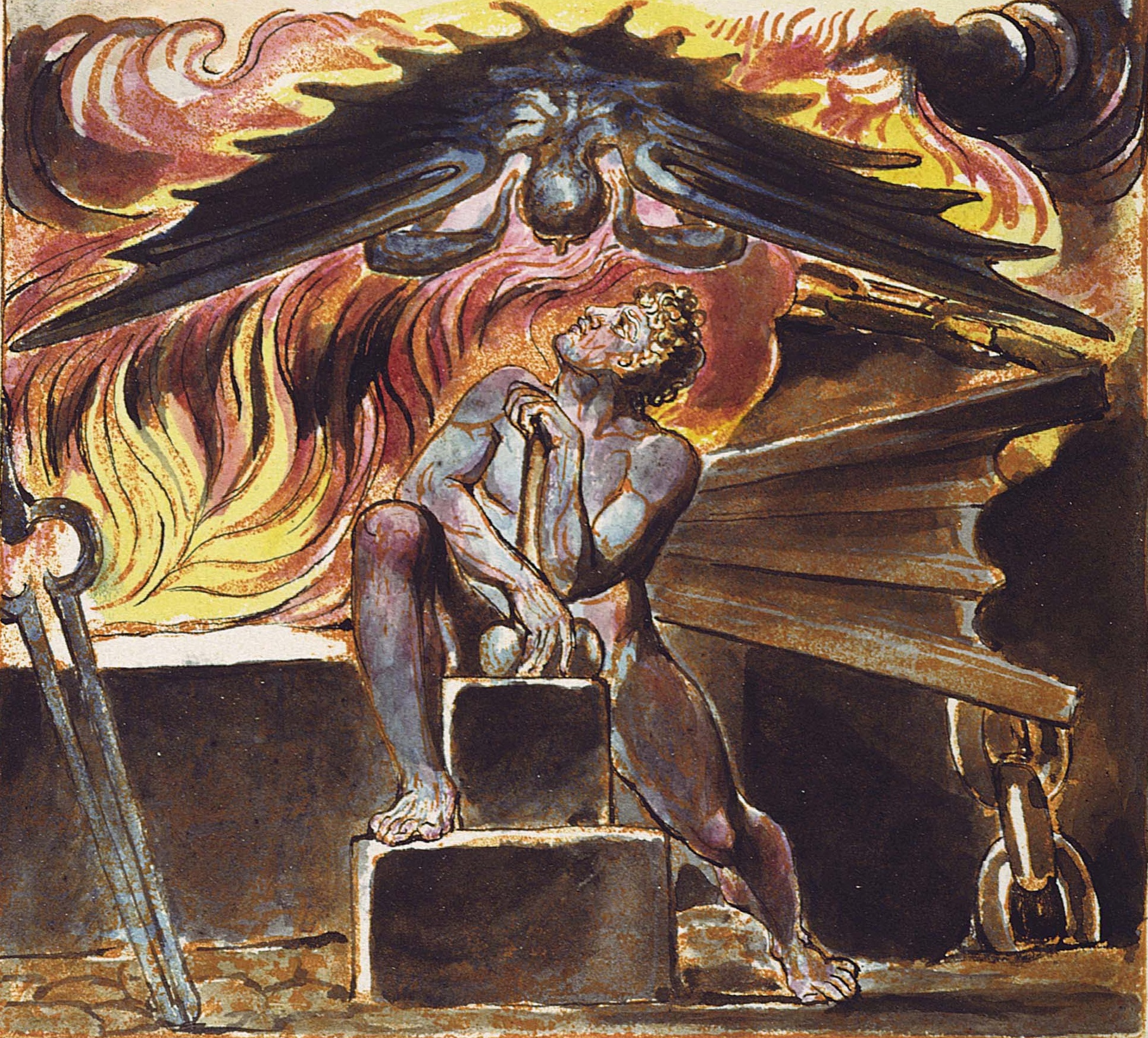
William Blake's mythology is both written and illustrated. Here, Los is tormented at his smithy by the Spectre in an illustration to Jerusalem.

William Blake set out his mythology in his "prophetic works" such as Vala, or The Four Zoas. These name several original gods, such as Urizen, Orc, Los, Albion, Rintrah, Ahania and Enitharmon. Later in the 19th century, stories by George MacDonald and H. Rider Haggard created fictional worlds; C. S. Lewis praised both for their "mythopoeic" gifts.

Lord Dunsany's 1905 book of short stories, The Gods of Pegana, is linked by Dunsany's invented pantheon of deities who dwell in Pegāna. It was followed by Time and the Gods, by some stories in The Sword of Welleran and Other Stories, and by Tales of Three Hemispheres. In 1919, Dunsany told an American interviewer, "In The Gods of Pegana I tried to account for the ocean and the moon. I don't know whether anyone else has ever tried that before." Dunsany's work influenced J.R.R. Tolkien's later writings.

T. S. Eliot's The Waste Land (1922) was a deliberate attempt to model a 20th-century mythology patterned after the birth-rebirth motif described by the anthropologist and folklorist James George Frazer.

=== J. R. R. Tolkien ===
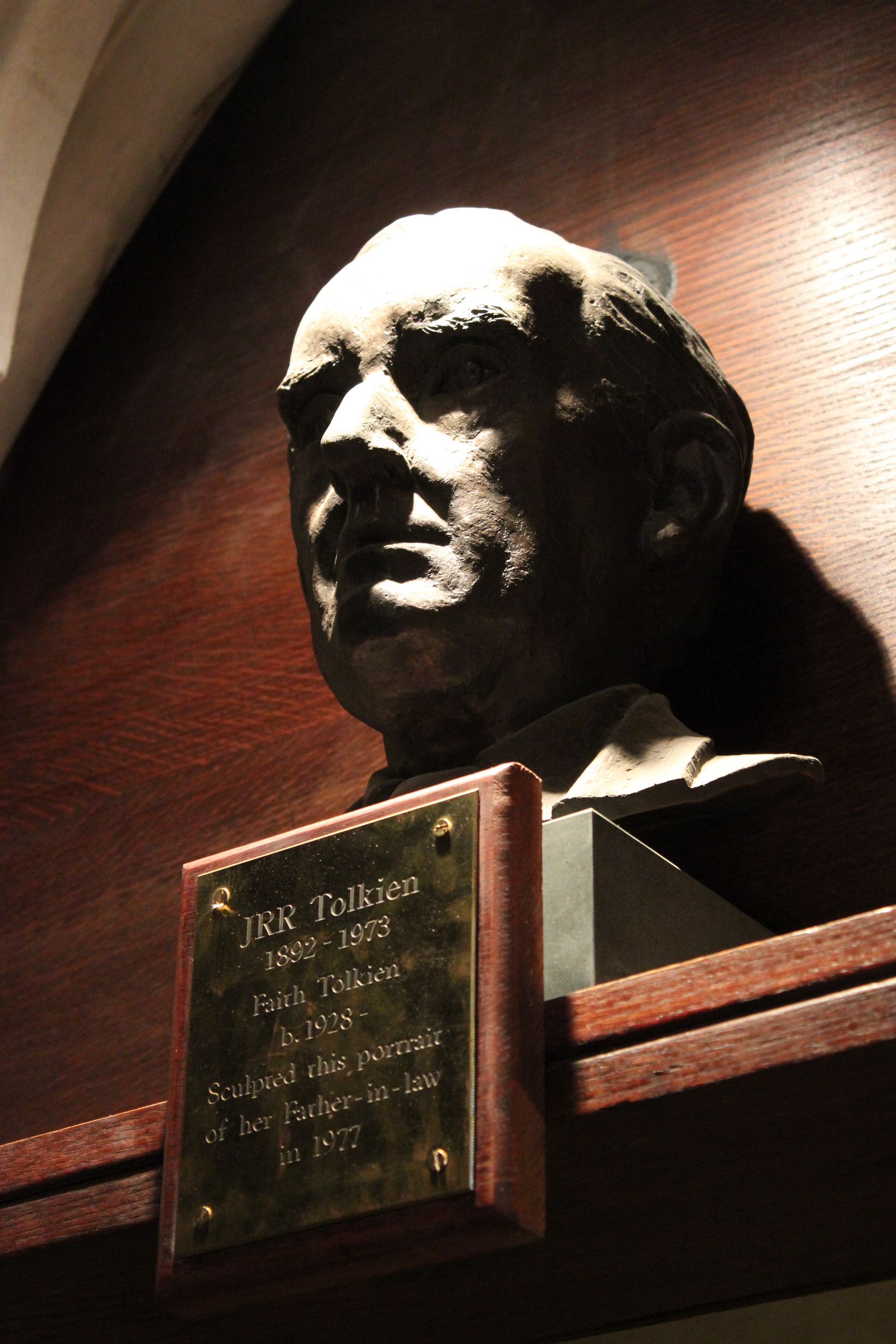
J.R.R. Tolkien's bust by Faith Falcounbridge in Exeter College, Oxford

J. R. R. Tolkien wrote a poem titled Mythopoeia following a discussion on the night of 19 September 1931 at Magdalen College, Oxford, with C. S. Lewis and Hugo Dyson, in which he intended to explain and defend creative myth-making. The poem describes the creative human author as "the little maker" wielding his "own small golden sceptre" and ruling his "subcreation" (understood as a creation of Man within God's primary creation).

Tolkien's wider legendarium includes not only origin myths, creation myths, and an epic poetry cycle, but also fictive linguistics, geology and geography. He more succinctly explores the function of such myth-making, "subcreation" and "Faery" in the short story Leaf by Niggle (1945), the novella Smith of Wootton Major (1967), and the essays Beowulf: The Monsters and the Critics (1936) and On Fairy-Stories (1939). Written in 1939 for presentation by Tolkien at the Andrew Lang lecture at the University of St Andrews and published in print in 1947, On Fairy-Stories explains "Faery" as both a fictitious realm and an archetypal plane in the psyche or soul from whence Man derives his "subcreative" capacity. Tolkien emphasizes the importance of language in the act of channeling "subcreation", speaking of the human linguistic faculty in general as well as the specifics of the language used in a given tradition, particularly in the form of story and song:

Mythology is not a disease at all, though it may like all human things become diseased. You might as well say that thinking is a disease of the mind. It would be more near the truth to say that languages, especially modern European languages, are a disease of mythology. But Language cannot, all the same, be dismissed. The incarnate mind, the tongue, and the tale are in our world coeval. The human mind, endowed with the powers of generalization and abstraction, sees not only green-grass, discriminating it from other things (and finding it fair to look upon), but sees that it is green as well as being grass. But how powerful, how stimulating to the very faculty that produced it, was the invention of the adjective: no spell or incantation in Faerie is more potent. And that is not surprising: such incantations might indeed be said to be only another view of adjectives, a part of speech in a mythical grammar. The mind that thought of light, heavy, grey, yellow, still, swift, also conceived of magic that would make heavy things light and able to fly, turn grey lead into yellow gold, and the still rock into a swift water. If it could do the one, it could do the other; it inevitably did both. When we can take green from grass, blue from heaven, and red from blood, we have already an enchanter's power—upon one plane; and the desire to wield that power in the world external to our minds awakes. It does not follow that we shall use that power well upon any plane. We may put a deadly green upon a man's face and produce a horror; we may make the rare and terrible blue moon to shine; or we may cause woods to spring with silver leaves and rams to wear fleeces of gold, and put hot fire into the belly of the cold worm. But in such "fantasy," as it is called, new form is made; Faerie begins; Man becomes a sub-creator.

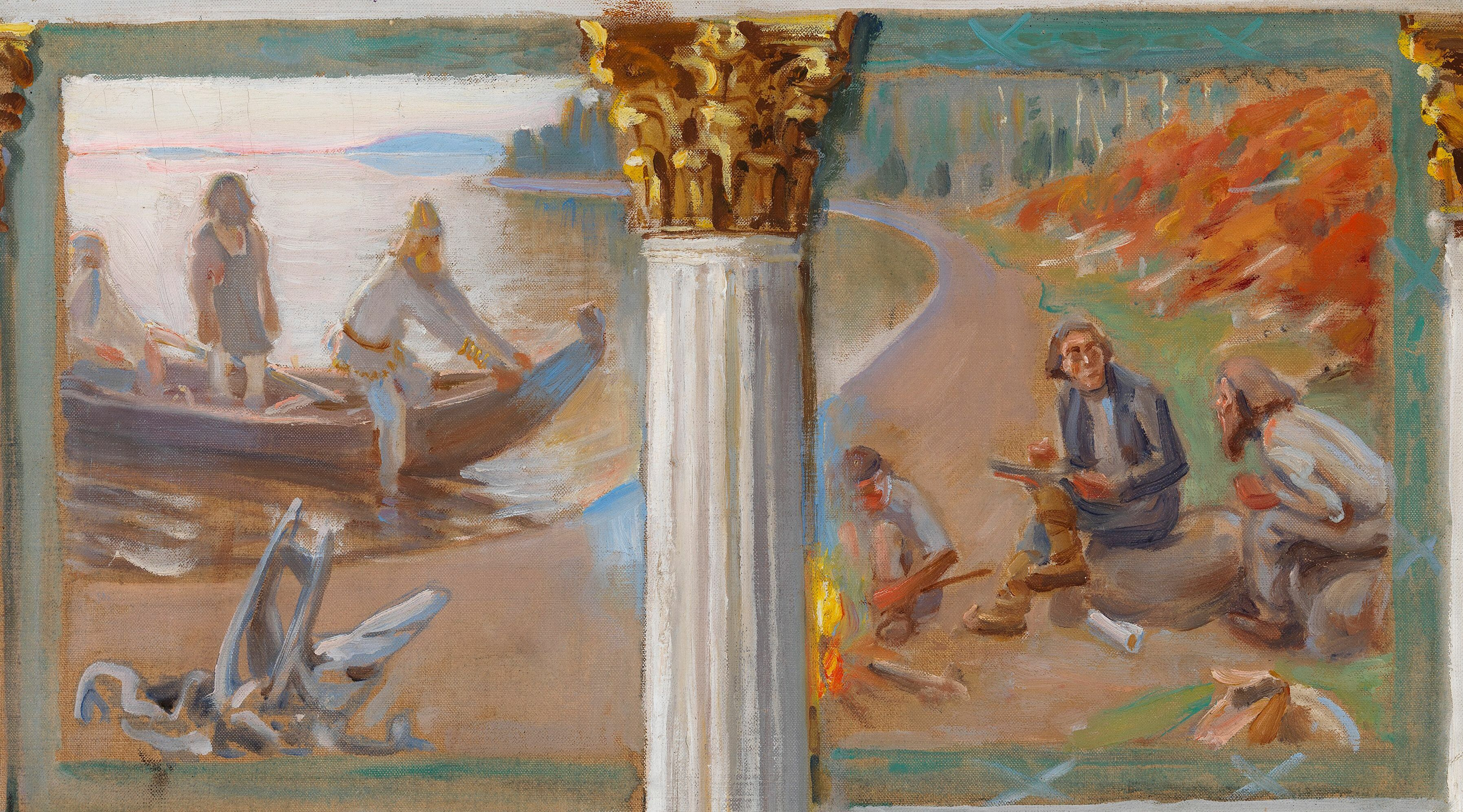
Tolkien was unable to emulate Elias Lönnrot, who travelled Finland recording oral folklore, and then reconstructed the country's mythology. 1912 sketch for a mural, Lönnrot and the Rune Singers, by Akseli Gallen-Kallela

Tolkien scholars have likened his views on the creation of myth to the Christian concept of Logos or "The Word", which is said to act as both "the [...] language of nature" spoken into being by God, and "a repetition in the finite mind of the eternal act of creation in the infinite I AM".

Verlyn Flieger wrote that Elias Lönnrot intentionally created the Kalevala as a mythology for Finland, giving it "a world of magic and mystery, a heroic age of story that may never have existed in precisely the form he gave it, but nevertheless fired Finland with a sense of its own independent worth." In her view, Tolkien, who had read the Kalevala, "envisioned himself" doing exactly the same thing, except that the mythology would be entirely fictive. Lönnrot had travelled the backwoods of Finland for 20 years, collecting stories and songs "from unlettered peasants". Tolkien meant to invent both the collectors and the storytellers, in his case Elves: "he would be at once the singer and the compiler, the performer and the audience."

=== C. S. Lewis ===
At the time that Tolkien debated the usefulness of myth and mythopoeia with C. S. Lewis in 1931, Lewis was a theist and liked but was sceptical of mythology, taking the position that myths were "lies and therefore worthless, even though 'breathed through silver'". However Lewis later began to speak of Christianity as the one "true myth". Lewis wrote, "The story of Christ is simply a true myth: a myth working on us in the same way as the others, but with this tremendous difference that it really happened." Subsequently, his Chronicles of Narnia is regarded as mythopoeia, with storylines referencing that Christian mythology, namely the narrative of a great king who is sacrificed to save his people and is resurrected. Lewis's mythopoeic intent is often confused with allegory, where the characters and world of Narnia would stand in direct equivalence with concepts and events from Christian theology and history, but Lewis repeatedly emphasized that an allegorical reading misses the point (the mythopoeia) of the Narnia stories. He shares this skepticism toward allegory with Tolkien, who disliked "conscious and intentional" allegory as it stood in opposition to the broad and "inevitable" allegory of themes like "Fall" and "Mortality".

=== Superheroes of comic books ===
In The Mythos of the Superheroes and the Mythos of the Saints, Thomas Roberts observes that:

To the student of myth, the mythos of the comics superheroes is of unique interest."
"Why do human beings want myths and how do they make them? Some of the answers to those questions can be found only sixty years back. Where did Superman and the other superheroes come from? In his Encyclopedia of the Superheroes, Jeff Rovin correctly observes, "In the earliest days, we called them 'gods'.

The 1938-debuting Superman, for example, sent from the "heavens" by his father to save humanity, is a messiah-type of character in the Biblical tradition. Furthermore, along with the rest of DC Comic's Justice League of America, Superman watches over humanity from the Watchtower in the skies; just as the Greek gods do from Mount Olympus.

=== In literary modernism ===
In modernist literature, mythopoeia served a crucial structural and philosophical function. For modernist writers, this was not a nostalgic revival of ancient stories but a deliberate aesthetic strategy to impose order and meaning upon the profound fragmentation, disillusionment, and spiritual uncertainty that characterized modern experience.

The modernist engagement with myth can be seen as a response to the collapse of traditional metaphysical certainties. As the movement grappled with a "growing alienation" from prevailing norms, myth offered a method to explore what scholar Scott Freer describes as "metaphysical perspectives that fall between material secularism and dogmatic religion". Exemplars include T. S. Eliot's "Mythical Method" and James Joyce's novel Ulysses.

== In film ==
Frank McConnell, author of Storytelling and Mythmaking and professor of English at the University of California, called film another "mythmaking" art, stating: "Film and literature matter as much as they do because they are versions of mythmaking." In his view, film is a perfect vehicle for mythmaking: "Film ... strives toward the fulfillment of its own projected reality in an ideally associative, personal world." In a broad analysis, McConnell associates the American western movies and romance movies with the Arthurian mythology, adventure and action movies with the "epic world" mythologies of founding societies, and many romance movies where the hero is allegorically playing the role of a knight, with "quest" mythologies like Sir Gawain and the Quest for the Holy Grail.

=== Star Wars ===
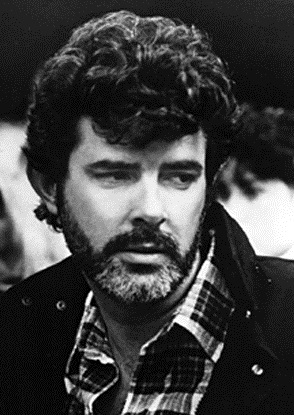
George Lucas

Filmmaker George Lucas speaks of the cinematic storyline of Star Wars as an example of modern myth-making. In 1999 he told Bill Moyers, "With Star Wars I consciously set about to re-create myths and the classic mythological motifs." McConnell writes that "it has passed, quicker than anyone could have imagined, from the status of film to that of legitimate and deeply embedded popular mythology." John Lyden, the Professor and Chair of the Religion Department at Dana College, argues that Star Wars does indeed reproduce religious and mythical themes; specifically, he argues that the work is apocalyptic in concept and scope. Steven D. Greydanus of The Decent Film Guide agrees, calling Star Wars a "work of epic mythopoeia." In fact, Greydanus argues that Star Wars is the primary example of American mythopoeia:

The Force, the Jedi knights, Darth Vader, Obi-Wan, Princess Leia, Yoda, lightsabers, and the Death Star hold a place in the collective imagination of countless Americans that can only be described as mythic. In my review of A New Hope I called Star Wars "the quintessential American mythology", an American take on King Arthur, Tolkien, and the samurai/wuxia epics of the East ...

— Steven D. Greydanus

Roger Ebert has observed of Star Wars that "It is not by accident that George Lucas worked with Joseph Campbell, an expert on the world's basic myths, in fashioning a screenplay that owes much to man's oldest stories." The "mythical" aspects of the Star Wars franchise have been challenged by other film critics. Regarding claims by Lucas himself, Steven Hart observes that Lucas didn't mention Joseph Campbell at the time of the original Star Wars; evidently they met only in the 1980s. Their mutual admiration "did wonders for [Campbell's] visibility" and obscured the tracks of Lucas in the "despised genre" science fiction; "the epics make for an infinitely classier set of influences."

== In music ==
In classical music, Richard Wagner's operas were a deliberate attempt to create a new kind of Gesamtkunstwerk ('total work of art'), transforming the legends of the Teutonic past nearly out of recognition into a new monument to the Romantic project.

While ostensibly known for improvised jamming, the rock group Phish first cemented as a group while producing leading member Trey Anastasio's senior project in college, called The Man Who Stepped into Yesterday. The song cycle features narration of major events in a mythical land called Gamehendge, containing types of imaginary creatures and primarily populated by a race called the "Lizards". It is essentially a postmodern pastiche, drawing from Anastasio's interest in musicals or rock operas as much as from reading philosophy and fiction. The creation of the myth is considered by many fans the thesis statement of the group, musically and philosophically, as Gamehendge's book of lost secrets (called the "Helping Friendly Book") is summarized as an encouragement to improvisation in any part of life: "the trick was to surrender to the flow."

The Progressive rock group Magma sets their songs around a musical space opera for more than fifteen albums, centering around fictional planet Kobaïa. Over the course of their first album, the band tells the story of a group of people fleeing a doomed Earth to settle on Kobaïa, where they create a spiritual utopia. Subsequently, conflict arises when the Kobaïans – descendants of the original colonists – encounter other Earth refugees. Later albums tell different stories set in more ancient times on Earth, as precursors to the later Kobaïan cycle. All of Magma's albums are sung in the constructed language known as Kobaïan, which was constructed by frontman and drummer Christian Vander because "French just wasn't expressive enough. Either for the story or for the sound of the music". Kobaïan is untranslated (the only song in English is the title track of Kobaïa, telling a story of refugees fleeing a future Earth and settling on Kobaïa), and understanding the epic of Kobaïa centers around feeling the lyrics, a limited translation of key vocabulary and clues left in the albums' liner notes.

Many releases of the psychedelic rock group King Gizzard & the Lizard Wizard share lyrical themes and feature characters that form a recurring cast, which appear at their lyrics, Music videos and Album covers. The band tell stories of "gamblers, cowboys, Australian Rules footballers, people-vultures, Balrogs, lightning gods, flesh-eating beasts, sages and space-faring eco rebels", many hinting part of a larger connected universe and shared storyline. Members of r/KGATLW, a subreddit dedicated to the band, popularised the term "Gizzverse" to describe the overarching narrative of their discography, about which many theories have been propagated. In a 2017 interview, Stu Mackenzie confirmed that the band's releases are all connected, saying, "They all exist in this parallel universe and they may be from different times and different places but they all can co-exist in a meaningful way".

The black metal band Immortal's lyricist Harald Nævdal has created a mythological realm called Blashyrkh filled with demons, battles, winter landscapes, woods, and darkness, described by the band as a northern "Frostdemon" realm.

== Organizations ==
The Mythopoeic Society exists to promote mythopoeic literature, with conferences, books, periodicals, and the Mythopoeic Awards.

== See also ==
- Campaign setting
- Constructed world
- Hero's journey
- Mythic fiction, literature that is rooted in tropes and themes of existing – instead of more artificial – mythology

== Bibliography ==
Inklings

Tolkien:

- Adcox, John. 2003. "Can Fantasy be Myth? Mythopoeia and The Lord of the Rings." The Newsletter of the Mythic Imagination Institute, September/October 2003.
- Menion, Michael. 2003/2004. "Tolkien Elves and Art, in J.R.R. Tolkien's Aesthetics." Firstworld.ca. (commentary on the poem "Mythopoeia").
- Chance, Jane (2004). Tolkien and the Invention of Myth: A Reader. University Press of Kentucky. ISBN 0-8131-2301-1.

C.S. Lewis, George MacDonald:

- Lobdell, Jared (1 July 2004). The Scientifiction Novels of C.S. Lewis: Space and Time in the Ransom Stories. McFarland. p. 162. ISBN 0-7864-8386-5.
- Lewis, C.S. (1946). The Great Divorce. Collins. 0-00-628056-0.

Film-making as myth-making

- McConnell, Frank D. (1979). Storytelling and Mythmaking: Images from Film and Literature. Oxford University Press, Incorporated. ISBN 978-0-19-503210-9.

Lucas:

- Hart, Steven (10 April 2002). "Galactic gasbag". Salon. Archived from the original on 17 December 2007.
- Greydanus, Steven D. 2006. "An American Mythology: Why Star Wars Still Matters." Decent Film Guide.
- Lyden, John. 2000. "The Apocalyptic Cosmology of Star Wars (Abstract)." The Journal of Religion & Film 4(1).

Genre fiction Literary genre Video game genre
