= Lin Carter's Simrana Cycle =

2018 collection of fantasy short stories by Lin Carter

- Cover of first edition
- Author: Lin Carter
- Illustrator: Roy G. Krenkel
- Cover artist: Stephen Hickman
- Language: English
- Genre: Fantasy
- Publisher: Celaeno Press
- Publication date: 2018
- Publication place: United States
- Media type: Print (hardcover, paperback), ebook
- Pages: 252
- ISBN: 978-4-902075-98-4
- OCLC: 1023541135

Lin Carter's Simrana Cycle is a collection of fantasy short stories by American writer Lin Carter, selected and edited by Robert M. Price. It was first published in hardcover, trade paperback and ebook by Celaeno Press in February 2018.

== Summary ==
The collection gathers together all twelve of Carter's tales set in his Lord Dunsany-inspired "dreamworld" of Simrana, some previously published and a few previously unpublished, including two newly completed by Robert M. Price and Glynn Owen Barrass. One story, previously published in two versions, "The Gods of Neol Shendis" and "The Gods of Nion Parma," is included in both forms. Appended are nine "Dunsanian" stories written as tributes to Carter and Simrana by Darrell Schweitzer, Gary Myers, Adrian Cole, Charles Garofalo, and Robert M. Price, along with some of the original stories that inspired Carter, eight by Lord Dunsany himself and one by Henry Kuttner.

== Contents ==
- "Introduction" (from Lin Carter: A Look Behind his Imaginary Worlds, 1991)
- "The Gods of Niom Parma" (from Warlocks and Warriors, 1970)
- "The Whelming of Oom" (from The Young Magicians, 1969)
- "Zingazar" (from New Worlds for Old, 1971)
- "How Sargoth Lay Siege to Zaremm" (from Swordsmen and Supermen, 1972)
- "The Laughter of Han" (from Fantasy Tales, v. 5, no. 9, spring 1982)
- "The Benevolence of Yib" (from Crypt of Cthulhu, no. 51, Hallowmas 1987)
- "How Ghuth Would Have Hunted the Silth" (from Crypt of Cthulhu, no. 54, Eastertide 1988)
- "The Thievery of Yish" (from Fantasy Tales, v. 10, no. 1, autumn 1988)
- "How Her Doom Came Down at Last on Adrazoon" (from Crypt of Cthulhu, no. 57, St. John's Eve 1988)
- "How Jal Set Forth on his Journeying"
- "The Gods of Neol Shendis" (from Amra, v. 2, no. 41, July 1966)
- "How Shand Became King of Thieves" (with Robert M. Price)
- "Caolin the Conjurer (Or, Dzimdazoul)" (with Glynn Owen Barrass)
- "The Philosopher Thief" (Darrell Schweitzer)
- "The Sorcerer’s Satchel" (Gary Myers)
- "An Unfamiliar Familiar" (Adrian Cole)
- "The Summoning of a Genie in Error" (Adrian Cole)
- "The Sad but Instructive Fable of Mangroth’s Tomes" (Charles Garofalo)
- "How Frindolf Got his Fill of Revenge" (Charles Garofalo)
- "The Devil’s Mine" (Robert M. Price)
- "The Good Simranatan" (Robert M. Price)
- "How Thongor Conquered Zaremm" (Robert M. Price)
- "The River" (Lord Dunsany) (from The Gods of Pegāna, 1905)
- "The Fortress Unvanquishable, Save for Sacnoth" (Lord Dunsany) (from The Sword of Welleran and Other Stories, 1908)
- "The Sword of Welleran" (Lord Dunsany) (from The Sword of Welleran and Other Stories, 1908)
- "Carcassonne" (Lord Dunsany) (from A Dreamer's Tales, 1910)
- "How Nuth Would Have Practiced His Art Upon the Gnoles" (Lord Dunsany) (from The Sketch, Feb. 15, 1911)
- "The Distressing Tale of Thangobrind the Jeweller, and of the Doom That Befell Him" (Lord Dunsany) (from The Sketch, Jan. 11, 1911)
- "In Zaccarath" (Lord Dunsany) (from Saturday Review, Aug. 14, 1909)
- "How the Enemy Came to Thlunrana" (Lord Dunsany) (from Saturday Review, Dec. 31, 1910)
- "The Jest of Droom Avista" (Henry Kuttner) (from Weird Tales, August 1937)
