= In the Land of Time, and Other Fantasy Tales =

Collection of short stories by Lord Dunsany

- First edition
- Author: Lord Dunsany
- Cover artist: Sidney Sime
- Publisher: Penguin Classics
- Publication date: 2004

In the Land of Time and Other Fantasy Tales is a posthumous collection of short stories by the writer Lord Dunsany in the Penguin Classics series. It was published in 2004. Edited and with an introduction by S. T. Joshi, it assembles material from across Dunsany's long career. The cover illustration is a colourised version of a classic illustration for an early Dunsany story by his preferred artist, Sidney Sime.

== Contents ==
The collection includes several of Dunsany's most famous stories. It is grouped in themed sections by the editor, and the contents are:

- Introduction (S. T. Joshi)
- Suggestions for Further Reading (S. T. Joshi)
- A Note on the Text (S. T. Joshi)
- Section I: Pegana and Environs
  - The Gods of Pegāna (entire text)
  - Time and the Gods ("The Lament of the Gods for Sardathrion")
  - "The Legend of the Dawn"
  - "In the Land of Time"
  - "The Relenting of Sarnidac"
  - "The Fall of Babbulkund"
- Section II: Tales of Wonder
  - "The Sword of Welleran"
  - "The Kith of the Elf-Folk"
  - "The Ghosts"
  - "The Fortress Unvanquishable, Save for Sacnoth"
  - "Blagdaross"
  - "Idle Days on the Yann"
  - "A Shop in Go-by Street"
  - "The Avenger of Perdóndaris"
  - "The Bride of the Man-Horse"
- Section III: Prose Poems
  - "Where the Tides Ebb and Flow"
  - "The Raft Builders"
  - "The Prayer of the Flowers"
  - "The Workman"
  - "Charon"
  - "Carcassonne"
  - "Roses"
  - "The City"
- Section IV: Fantasy and Reality
  - "The Wonderful Window"
  - "The Coronation of Mr. Thomas Shap"
  - "The City on Mallington Moor"
  - "The Bureau d'Echange de Maux"
  - "The Exiles' Club"
  - "Thirteen at Table"
  - "The Last Dream of Bwona Khubla"
- Section V: Jorkens
  - "The Tale of the Abu Laheeb" (the first Jorkens story)
  - "Our Distant Cousins"
  - "The Walk to Lingham"
  - "The Development of the Rillswood Estate"
  - "A Life's Work"
- Section VI: Some Late Tales
  - "The Policeman's Prophecy"
  - "The Two Bottles of Relish"
  - "The Cut"
  - "Poseidon"
  - "Helping the Fairies"
  - "The Romance of His Life"
  - "The Pirate of the Round Pond"
- Explanatory Notes (S. T. Joshi)

== Reception ==
Ursula K. Le Guin reviewed the collection for the Los Angeles Times. She described the effect reading A Dreamer's Tales had on her as a child, comparing his effect to J. R. R. Tolkien. She felt that The Gods of Pegāna had aged poorly, and that Jorkens could be a bore. However, she stated that other early works were fine, especially "Idle Days on the Yann", and that Dunsany's best stories were "unique" and well-observed, witty, and had "a mannered but vivid, clear, and subtle style".

== Sources ==
- The Locus Index to Science Fiction, 2004
