= The Fortress Unvanquishable, Save for Sacnoth =

1908 fantasy short story by Lord Dunsany

- Short story by Lord Dunsany
- Genre: Fantasy

Publication
- Published in: The Sword of Welleran and Other Stories
- Publication type: Short story collection
- Publisher: George Allen & Sons
- Publication date: 1908

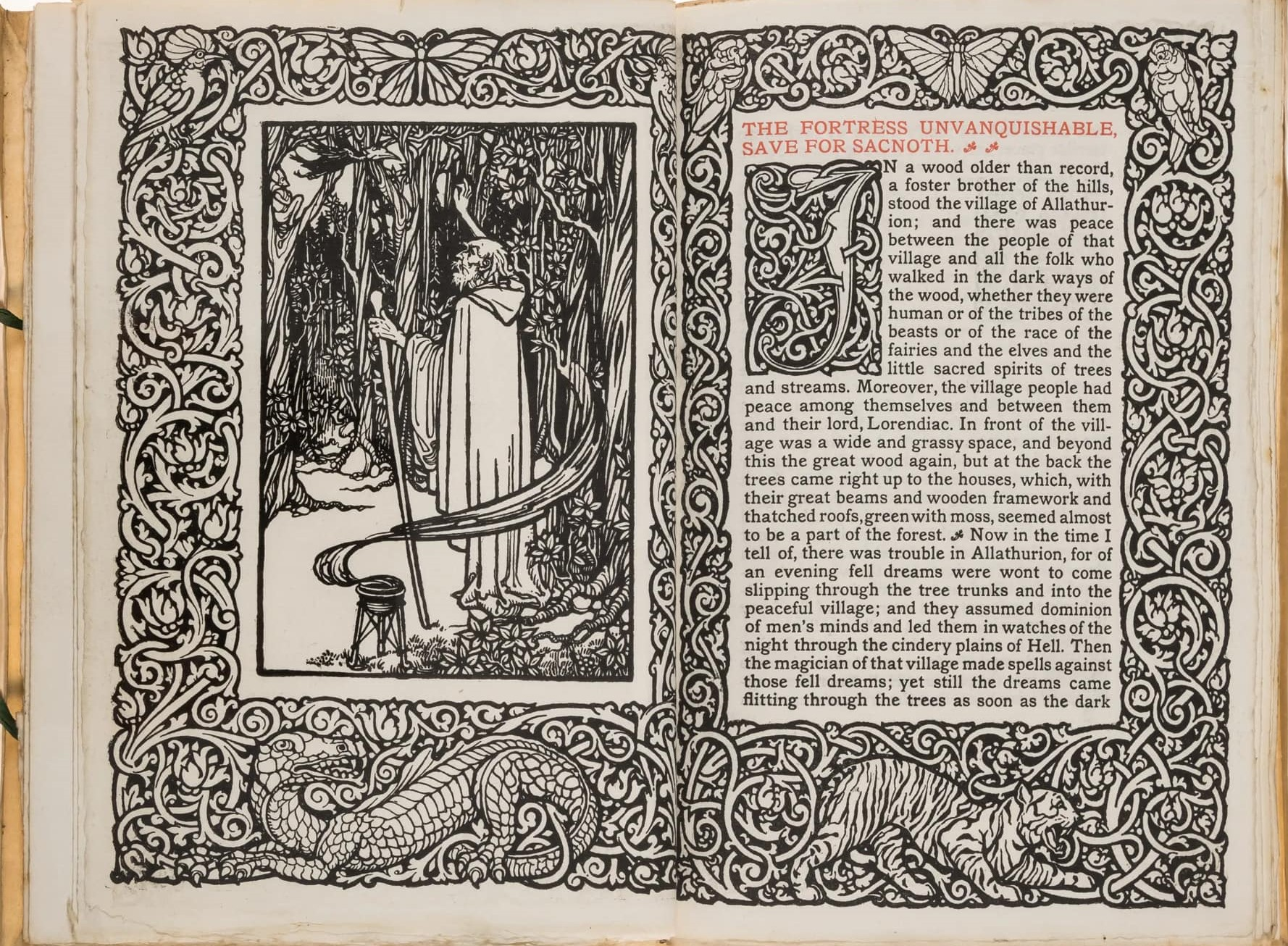
Limited Separate Edition. Bound by William F. Northend and published in Sheffield at the School of Art Press in 1910. 1 of 10 bound in vellum.

"The Fortress Unvanquishable, Save for Sacnoth" is a fantasy short story by Lord Dunsany, first published in his 1908 collection The Sword of Welleran and Other Stories. It describes the hero Leothric's quest to free his people from bad dreams the evil sorcerer Gaznak has set on them, by first finding the sword Sacnoth and then venturing into Gaznak's fortress.

The story has been described as one of Dunsany's best and a major influence on sword and sorcery fiction.

== Plot ==
The story begins in the village of Allathurion, where the people are having bad dreams. Their wizard announces that his best spell could not dispel the dreams, which must be the work of the powerful wizard Gaznak, who can only be defeated with the sword Sacnoth. Leothric, the son of the local lord vows to obtain it: the yet unmade sword, to be forged from the rod protecting the spine of the metallic dragon-crocodile Tharagavverug.

Leothric finds Tharagavverug and kills it by beating its soft lead nose every time it tries to eat, which makes it recoil in pain without eating. After three days it starves; a smith smelts out the sword-piece, sharpening an edge with the dragon-croc's eye, putting its other eye in the sword's hilt.

Leothric reaches Gaznak's fortress, thanks to Tharagavverug's eye navigating a path through the swamps. Inside he encounters camel-riders armed with scimitars, a giant spider spinning obstructive ropes, queens and princes dining, and dream spirits that resemble beautiful women but have fire in their eye sockets. Many flee when they hear the name Sacnoth. He crosses a path between two great abysses, killing a dragon who serves Gaznak, before slaying another, Wong Bongerok, with Sacnoth's help.

Leothric enters Gaznak's chamber and sees the wizard's dreams. Magical musicians cast a death spell at him, but Sacnoth turns it aside. Gaznak and Leothric fight; Sacnoth cannot pierce his armour, but when Leothric strikes at Gaznak's neck, Gaznak pulls his own head off to evade the blow. When Leothric cuts Gaznak's hand off, the wizard dies and the fortress and dreams vanish. Leothric returns home, and the story ends with a note that not everyone believes this story.

== Style ==
According to John D. Rateliff, Dunsany's greatest strength as a short story writer was his evocative power; plot and character were in the service of image and atmosphere, and "The Fortress Unvanquishable, Save for Sacnoth" makes full use of this ability. It piles up fantastic images which acquire an overwhelming power. The story contrasts familiar images such as woods, hills, and villages with the magical, heightening the effect of both.

The style of the story is deliberately poetic and archaic, in both word choice (such as using "fell" for "deadly" and "ere" for "before") and grammar. It often inverts normal sentence order or uses long sentences held together with many "and"s to heighten the flow of images. It also uses repetition, alliteration, and assonance.

"The Fortress Unvanquishable, Save for Sacnoth" makes frequent references to Hell, Satan, and other Christian themes. This is a break from Dunsany's earlier stories (such as The Gods of Pegāna), which centre on the imagined mythology of Pegāna; it anticipates his later work set in the real world. Despite this serious theme, there are humorous elements such as Wong Bongerok "slobbering" Gaznak's hand. The fight with Tharagavverug may be ridiculous, but has been described as "probably the most original method of dragonslaying ever devised".

== Publication history ==
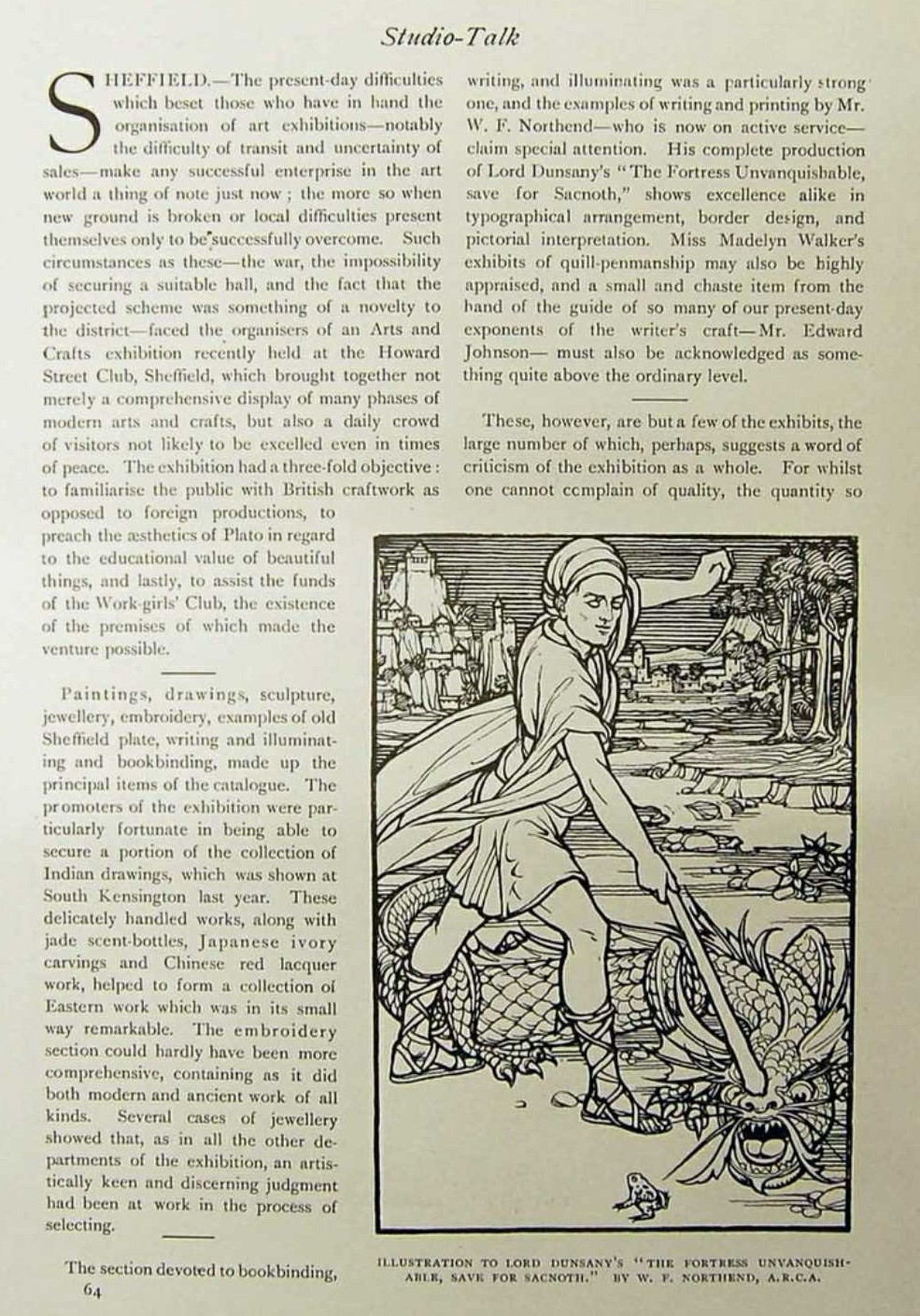
Sheffield Arts and Crafts Exhibition, 1914.

"The Fortress Unvanquishable, Save for Sacnoth" was first published in Dunsany's collection The Sword of Welleran and Other Stories, printed by George Allen & Sons in 1908. In 1910, it was republished as an incredibly scarce arts-and-crafts style chapbook, with "decorations" by William F. Northend, which was later presented at an Arts and Crafts exhibition in Sheffield at the Howard Street Club in 1914. Limited to a quantity of 30, #1 through #10 were bound in full limp vellum, with #11 through #30 in paper-backed boards and a buckram spine.

== Reception and influence ==
"The Fortress Unvanquishable, Save for Sacnoth" has been called one of Dunsany's best stories, "his first indisputable masterpiece", and "one of the finest short pieces of its type in English".

The story was a major influence and inspiration for writers such as J. R. R. Tolkien, H. P. Lovecraft, Fritz Leiber, Clark Ashton Smith, and Jack Vance, but Dunsany was unaware of this until nearly the end of his life. It has been called "perhaps the first sword and sorcery story ever written", with almost all the usual elements of the type present, and The Encyclopedia of Fantasy states that it "almost singlehandedly created the Sword and Sorcery genre"; in his introduction to In the Land of Time, and Other Fantasy Tales, S. T. Joshi noted it as one of several of Dunsany's stories which might be said to have created the subgenre. However, the sensible Leothric is more like a fairy-tale hero than a Conanesque barbarian, and the tale does not have the thrills and excitement of typical sword and sorcery.

Sacnoth is the first sentient sword in fantasy fiction, and an influence on the sword Caudimordax in Tolkien's story Farmer Giles of Ham and Stormbringer in Michael Moorcock's Elric novels.
