= Idle Days on the Yann =

- Short story by Lord Dunsany
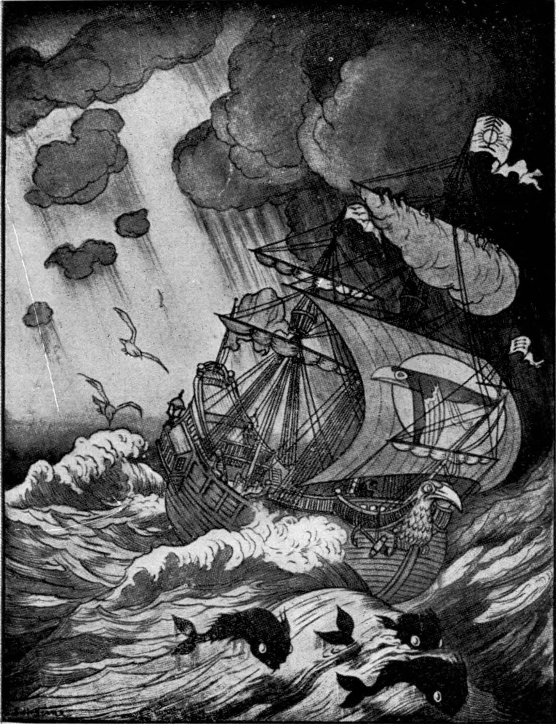
- Bird of the River, illustration by Sidney Sime
- Country: United Kingdom
- Language: English
- Genre: Fantasy short story

Publication
- Published in: A Dreamer's Tales
- Publication type: Short story collection
- Publisher: George Allen & Sons
- Media type: Print
- Publication date: 1910

"Idle Days on the Yann" is a short story by the Irish writer Lord Dunsany. It takes place in the Lands of Dream and follows an Irishman's voyage down a river flanked by fantastical cities. It was published in the short story collections A Dreamer's Tales (1910) and Tales of Three Hemispheres (1919). Sidney Sime illustrated the story with two images.

Dunsany wrote two sequel stories, both published in 1912. H. P. Lovecraft took inspiration from "Idle Days on the Yann" for several of his stories.

== Background ==
Like many of Dunsany's early works, "Idle Days on the Yann" is set in a dreamworld where the descriptions recall Arabia, Greece, North Africa and India. In his autobiography Patches of Sunlight (1938), Dunsany explained the background to this setting as a combination of Biblical readings, an interest in Greco-Roman antiquity, having briefly seen Tangier at the turn of the century, stories about Egypt his father had told him, the impact of Rudyard Kipling's fiction at a young age, and experiences from South Africa during the Second Boer War. "Idle Days on the Yann" in particular was written in anticipation for a trip down the Nile.

== Plot summary ==
At the River Yann, the nameless protagonist embarks on the ship Bird of the River to travel to Bar-Wul-Yann: the Gate of Yann. He says he is from Ireland, and the sailors mock him because no such place exists in the land of dreams. When everybody on board pray to their gods, the protagonist chooses the obscure and abandoned god Sheol Nugganoth. The ship makes stops at the cities Mandaroon, where the citizens sleep to prevent the gods from dying and ending the dreams of mankind, and Astahahn, where citizens use ancient rituals to prevent Time from slaying the gods. In Perdóndaris, a merchant buys the captain's cargo of toomarund carpets and smokable tollub. The protagonist is impressed by Perdóndaris, but discovers a huge ivory gate made of one solid piece, and returns to the ship terrified. A couple of days later, they stop at Nen, the last city on the river. Nen is crowded with Wanderers, a strange singing and dancing tribe that descends from the mountains once every seven years. The ship finally reaches the Gate of Yann: two narrow, mountain-high, smooth and pink marble cliffs that the river flows between into the sea. Departing, the protagonist knows he will not meet the captain again, because his fancy is growing weaker.

== Reception ==
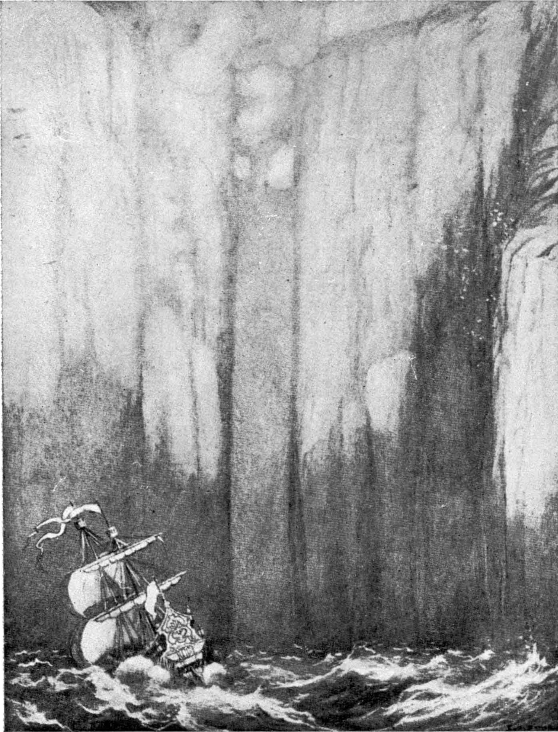
The Gate of Yann, illustration by Sidney Sime

W. B. Yeats wrote: "Had I read 'The Fall of Babbulkund' or 'Idle Days on the Yann' when I was a boy, I had perhaps been changed for better or worse, and looked to that first reading as the creation of my world; for when we are young the less circumstantial, the further from common life a book is, the more does it touch our hearts and make us dream. We are idle, unhappy, exorbitant, and like the young Blake admit no city beautiful that is not paved with gold and silver".

== Legacy ==
Dunsany wrote two sequels to the story: "A Shop in Go-by Street" and "The Avenger of Perdóndaris". Both were first published in 1912 and included, together with the original story, in Tales of Three Hemispheres (1919). In the sequels, the same narrator tries to return to the Lands of Dream to revisit the crew of the Bird of the River, but has trouble doing so. The stories further explore Dunsany's conception of poetic imagination as an intermediary between the ordinary world and the lands of myths and dreams, as well as the view that all these worlds are illusions.

The surface plot of H. P. Lovecraft's 1919 short story "The White Ship" is modeled on "Idle Days on the Yann". Unlike Dunsany, Lovecraft made his tale allegorical and included philosophical themes. Lovecraft's "The Cats of Ulthar" (1920) also features a tribe called the Wanderers, with similarities to the one in "Idle Days on the Yann". Further, Robert M. Price has argued that the name of Lovecraft's fictional deity Shub-Niggurath is likely to have been inspired by Sheol Nugganoth in Dunsany's story. Jorge Luis Borges included "Idle Days on the Yann" in his Library of Babel. The influence of this story on The Doom That Came to Sarnath can be seen in the reference to a throne "wrought of one piece of ivory, though no man lives who knows whence so vast a piece could have come", which evokes the gate "carved out of one solid piece" of ivory in Dunsany's story.

== See also ==
- Gates of horn and ivory
- Sheol
