= Fifty Poems =

Book of poetry by Lord Dunsany

- First US edition
- Author: Lord Dunsany
- Language: English
- Publisher: G. P. Putnam's Sons (US)
- Publication date: 1929
- Publication place: United Kingdom
- Media type: Print (hardback)

Fifty Poems is a collection of poetry by fantasy author Lord Dunsany. His first poetry collection, it was first published in hardcover simultaneously in London and New York City by G. P. Putnam's Sons in October 1929.

The book collects fifty poems by the author.

== Contents ==
- "Art and Life"
- "The Hunter Dreams in His Club"
- "A Song of Wandering"
- "Evening in Africa"
- "Night"
- "Ode to a Dublin Critic"
- "In the Sahara"
- "Under Mount Monadnock"
- "The Traveller"
- "Songs from an Evil Wood (I)"
- "Songs from an Evil Wood (II)"
- "The Memorial"
- "A Dirge of Victory"
- "To the Fallen Irish Soldiers"
- "The Riders"
- "The Watchers"
- "The Enchanted People"
- "Lady Blayn"
- "Inscribed in a Copy of Five Plays"
- "Inscribed in a Copy of The King of Elfland's Daughter"
- "At the Time of the Full Moon"
- "The Happy Isles"
- "Nemesis"
- "A Heterodoxy"
- "A Moment"
- "On a Portrait"
- "To a Coffin from Ur"
- "In an Old Land"
- "Affairs"
- "To Keats"
- "The Forsaken Windmill"
- "To Those That Come After"
- "In Wild-Rose Garden"
- "Waiting"
- "A Call to the Wild"
- "In a Yorkshire Valley"
- "Snow on the East Wind"
- "A Word in Season"
- "The Worm and the Star"
- "Al Shaldomir (A Song in a Play)"
- "Song of the Iris Marshes"
- "A Ballade of the Last Night"
- "The Statue"
- "In the Silence"
- "The Inspiration"
- "The Lost Trick"
- "Raw Material"
- "The Quest"
- "The Call"
- "The Deserted Kingdom"
