= Tales of Three Hemispheres =

Book by Lord Dunsany (1919)

- First edition
- Author: Lord Dunsany
- Language: English
- Genre: Fantasy
- Publisher: John W. Luce & Co.
- Publication date: 1919
- Publication place: United States
- Media type: Print (hardcover)

Tales of Three Hemispheres is a collection of fantasy short stories by Lord Dunsany. The first edition was published in Boston by John W. Luce & Co. in November 1919; the first British edition was published in London by T. Fisher Unwin in June 1920.

The collection's significance in the history of fantasy literature was recognized by its republication in a new edition by Owlswick Press in 1976, with illustrations by Tim Kirk and a foreword by H. P. Lovecraft, actually a general article on Dunsany's work originally written by Lovecraft in 1922, but unpublished until it appeared in his posthumous Marginalia (Arkham House, 1944).

The book collects 14 short pieces by Dunsany; the last three, under the general heading "Beyond the Fields We Know", are related tales, as explained in the publisher's note preceding the first, "Idle Days on the Yann", which was previously published in the author's earlier collection A Dreamer's Tales, but reprinted in the current one owing to the relationship.

== Contents ==
- "Foreword: Lord Dunsany and His Work" by H. P. Lovecraft (1976 edition only)
- "The Last Dream of Bwona Khubla"
- "How the Office of Postman Fell Vacant in Otford-under-the-Wold"
- "The Prayer of Boob Aheera"
- "East and West"
- "A Pretty Quarrel"
- "How the Gods Avenged Meoul Ki Ning"
- "The Gift of the Gods"
- "The Sack of Emeralds"
- "The Old Brown Coat"
- "An Archive of the Older Mysteries"
- "A City of Wonder"
- Beyond the Fields We Know

- "Publisher's Note"
- "First Tale: Idle Days on the Yann"
- "Second Tale: A Shop in Go-By Street"
- "Third Tale: The Avenger of Perdóndaris"

== Reception ==
The Irish Times reviewed Tales of Three Hemispheres negatively, stating that although the stories were evocative they frequently lost their power. It described the sequels to "Idle Days on the Yann" as inferior, and "East and West" as the best story in the book.

== Sources ==
- Joshi, S. T. (1993). Lord Dunsany: a Bibliography / by S. T. Joshi and Darrell Schweitzer. Metuchen, N.J.: The Scarecrow Press, Inc. pp. 10–11, 265.
