= The Book of Wonder =

Book by Lord Dunsany (1912)

- Author: Lord Dunsany
- Illustrator: Sidney H. Sime
- Language: English
- Genre: Fantasy
- Published: 1912 William Heinemann
- Publication place: Ireland, and also the United Kingdom
- Media type: Print (hardback)
- Preceded by: A Dreamer's Tales
- Followed by: Five Plays

The Book of Wonder is the seventh book and fifth original short story collection of Irish fantasy writer Lord Dunsany, considered a major influence on the work of J. R. R. Tolkien, H. P. Lovecraft, Ursula K. Le Guin, and others. It was first published in hardcover by William Heinemann in November 1912, and has been reprinted a number of times since. A 1918 edition from the Modern Library was actually a combined edition with Time and the Gods.

== Contents ==
The book collects fourteen fantasy short stories by the author.

Lord Dunsany employed the talents of Sidney Sime to illustrate his fantasy short story collections, but The Book of Wonder is unique in that Sime drew the illustrations first, and Lord Dunsany wrote the tales to incorporate them:

I found Mr Sime one day, in his strange house at Worplesdon, complaining that editors did not offer him very suitable subjects for illustration; so I said: "Why not do any pictures you like, and I will write stories explaining them, which may add a little to their mystery?"

Of the 14 tales, only the last two ("Chu-Bu and Sheemish" and "The Wonderful Window") were not derived from a Sime drawing.

=== Gnolls ===
The short story "How Nuth Would Have Practised His Art upon the Gnoles" is likely the origin of the term gnoll, used in a number of later works, notably the Dungeons and Dragons gaming franchise, to describe a humanoid fantasy race.

== Chapters ==
- "Preface"
- "The Bride of the Man-Horse"
- "The Distressing Tale of Thangobrind the Jeweller, and of the Doom that Befell Him"
- "The House of the Sphinx"
- "The Probable Adventure of the Three Literary Men"
- "The Injudicious Prayers of Pombo the Idolator"
- "The Loot of Bombasharna"
- "Miss Cubbidge and the Dragon of Romance"
- "The Quest of the Queen's Tears"
- "The Hoard of the Gibbelins"
- "How Nuth Would Have Practised His Art upon the Gnoles"
- "How One Came, as Was Foretold, to the City of Never"
- "The Coronation of Mr. Thomas Shap"
- "Chu-Bu and Sheemish"
- "The Wonderful Window"
- "Epilogue"

== Reception ==
Padraic Colum reviewed The Book of Wonder for the Irish Times, using "The Wonderful Window" as a metaphor for Dunsany himself. He described the main character of Dunsany's previous stories as Time, and his world as "curiously elementary", full of simple and terrible happenings. However, he noted that though the new stories in The Book of Wonder were less marvellous, they were more closely related to the real world and more psychologically complex.

In a 1981 review of The Dictionary of Imaginary Places by Alberto Manguel and Gianni Guadalupi, Naomi Mitchison praised The Book of Wonder and its illustrations as "a real imagination stirrer".
