= Time and the Gods =

Book of short stories by Lord Dunsany (1906)

- First edition
- Author: Lord Dunsany
- Illustrator: Sidney Sime
- Language: English
- Genre: Fantasy
- Publisher: William Heinemann
- Publication date: 1906
- Publication place: United Kingdom
- Media type: Print (hardback)
- Preceded by: The Gods of Pegāna
- Followed by: The Sword of Welleran and Other Stories

Time and the Gods is the second book by Irish fantasy writer Lord Dunsany, considered a major influence on the work of J. R. R. Tolkien, H. P. Lovecraft, Ursula K. Le Guin, and others. It is a collection of short stories linked by Dunsany's invented pantheon of deities who dwell in Pegāna. It was preceded by his earlier collection The Gods of Pegāna and followed by some stories in The Sword of Welleran and Other Stories. Dunsany included a brief preface in the original edition and added a new introduction to the 1922 edition.

The book was first published in hardcover by William Heinemann in September, 1906, and has been reprinted a number of times since. It was issued by the Modern Library in an unauthorised combined edition with The Book of Wonder under the latter's title in 1918.

The book was illustrated by Dunsany's preferred artist Sidney Sime, who provided ten full-page black and white illustrations, the originals of which are still at Dunsany Castle. These were present in the 1906 and 1922 editions, not in the unauthorised collections and not in most modern reproductions.

The title is thought to have been influenced by Algernon Swinburne, who wrote the line "Time and the Gods are at strife" in his 1866 poem "Hymn to Proserpine".

== Contents ==
- "Preface"
- "Time and the Gods"
- "The Coming of the Sea"
- "A Legend of the Dawn"
- "The Vengeance of Men"
- "When the Gods Slept"
- "The King That Was Not"
- "The Cave of Kai"
- "The Sorrow of Search"
- "The Men of Yarnith"
- "For the Honour of the Gods"
- "Night and Morning"
- "Usury"
- "Mlideen"
- "The Secret of the Gods"
- "The South Wind"
- "In the Land of Time"
- "The Relenting of Sardinac"
- "The Jest of the Gods"
- "The Dreams of the Prophet"
- "The Journey of the King"

== Reception ==
The Freeman's Journal described Time and the Gods as "the product of a somewhat bizarre, but not infertile imagination". The review read the work allegorically as a statement on the decline of faith, and attacked it as materialistic, decadent, unhealthy, and unpleasant.

== Sources ==
- Joshi, S. T. (1993). Lord Dunsany: a Bibliography / by S. T. Joshi and Darrell Schweitzer. Metuchen, N.J.: The Scarecrow Press, Inc. p. 2.
