= The Sword of Welleran and Other Stories =

Book by Lord Dunsany (1908)

- First edition
- Author: Lord Dunsany
- Illustrator: Sidney Sime
- Language: English
- Genre: Fantasy
- Publisher: George Allen & Sons
- Publication date: 1908
- Publication place: United Kingdom
- Media type: Print (hardback)
- Preceded by: Time and the Gods
- Followed by: A Dreamer's Tales

The Sword of Welleran and Other Stories is the third book by Anglo-Irish fantasy writer Lord Dunsany, considered a major influence on the work of J. R. R. Tolkien, H. P. Lovecraft, Ursula K. Le Guin, and others. It was first published in hardcover by George Allen & Sons in October 1908, and has been reprinted a number of times since. Issued by the Modern Library in a combined edition with A Dreamer's Tales as A Dreamer's Tales and Other Stories in 1917.

The book is a series of short stories. One of the stories, "The Fortress Unvanquishable, Save For Sacnoth", was afterwards (1910) published by itself as a separate book, a now very-rare "Art-and-Craft"-style limited edition.

== Contents ==
- "The Sword of Welleran"
- "The Fall of Babbulkund"
- "The Kith of the Elf-Folk"
- "The Highwaymen"
- "In the Twilight"
- "The Ghosts"
- "The Whirlpool"
- "The Hurricane"
- "The Fortress Unvanquishable, Save for Sacnoth"
- "The Lord of Cities"
- "The Doom of La Traviata"
- "On the Dry Land"

== Reception ==
The Irish Times review described Dunsany's stories as "baffling", but called his style beautiful and his imagination strange but "captivating". It predicted that he would not be popular, but that he would have a cult following. It also praised Sime's illustrations.

E. F. Bleiler, reviewing The Sword of Welleran and Other Stories, listed "The Kith of the Elf-Folk", "The Ghosts", "The Hurricane" and "The Fortress Unvanquishable, Save for Sacnoth" as the best stories in the volume.

The Sword of Welleran and Other Stories marked the end of Dunsany's writing about Pegāna and the beginning of a new phase of his career, in which he wrote heroic fantasies in a more modern style. Darrell Schweitzer states that this period included much of his best work. "The Fortress Unvanquishable, Save for Sacnoth" was one of the chief influences on sword and sorcery fiction. Another important breakthrough was that Dunsany was writing short stories; heroic fantasy's forerunners were usually lengthy works.

== Sources ==
- Joshi, S. T. (1993). Lord Dunsany: a Bibliography / by S. T. Joshi and Darrell Schweitzer. Metuchen, N.J.: The Scarecrow Press, Inc. pp. 2–3.
