= The Gods of Pegāna =

First book by Lord Dunsany (1905)

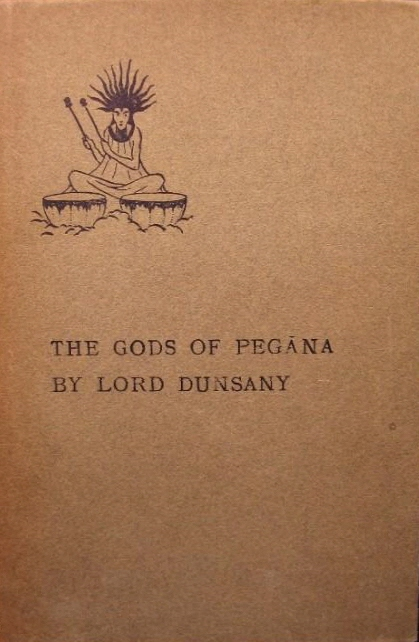
- Cover of The Gods of Pegāna
- Author: Lord Dunsany
- Illustrator: Sidney Sime
- Cover artist: Sidney Sime
- Language: English
- Genre: Fantasy
- Publisher: Elkin Mathews
- Publication date: 1905
- Publication place: United Kingdom
- Media type: Print (hardback)
- Pages: 94
- Followed by: Time and the Gods
- Text: The Gods of Pegāna at Wikisource

The Gods of Pegāna is the first book by Anglo-Irish writer Lord Dunsany, published in 1905. The fantasy book was reviewed favourably but as an unusual piece. One of the more influential reviews was by Edward Thomas in the London Daily Chronicle.

== Contents ==
The book is a series of short stories linked by Dunsany's invented pantheon of deities who dwell in Pegāna. It was followed by a further collection, Time and the Gods, and by some stories in The Sword of Welleran and Other Stories and possibly in Tales of Three Hemispheres.

The book contains a range of illustrations by Sidney Sime, the originals of all of which can be seen at Dunsany Castle.

In 1919 Dunsany told an American interviewer: "In The Gods of Pegāna I tried to account for the ocean and the moon. I don't know whether anyone else has ever tried that before".

=== Stories ===
- "Preface"
- "The Gods of Pegāna"
- "Of Skarl the Drummer"
- "Of the Making of the Worlds"
- "Of the Game of the Gods"
- "The Chaunt of the Gods"
- "The Sayings of Kib"
- "Concerning Sish"
- "The Sayings of Slid"
- "The Deeds of Mung"
- "The Chaunt of the Priests"
- "The Sayings of Limpang-Tung"
- "Of Yoharneth-Lahai"
- "Of Roon, the God of Going"
- "The Revolt of the Home Gods"
- "Of Dorozhand"
- "The Eye in the Waste"
- "Of the Thing That Is Neither God Nor Beast"
- "Yonath the Prophet"
- "Yug the Prophet"
- "Alhireth-Hotep the Prophet"
- "Kabok the Prophet"
- "Of the Calamity That Befel Yūn-Ilāra by the Sea, and of the Building of the Tower of the Ending of Days"
- "Of How the Gods Whelmed Sidith"
- "Of How Imbaun Became High Prophet in Aradec of All the Gods Save One"
- "Of How Imbaun Met Zodrak"
- "Pegāna"
- "The Sayings of Imbaun"
- "Of How Imbaun Spake of Death to the King"
- "Of Ood"
- "The River"
- "The Bird of Doom and the End"

== The pantheon ==
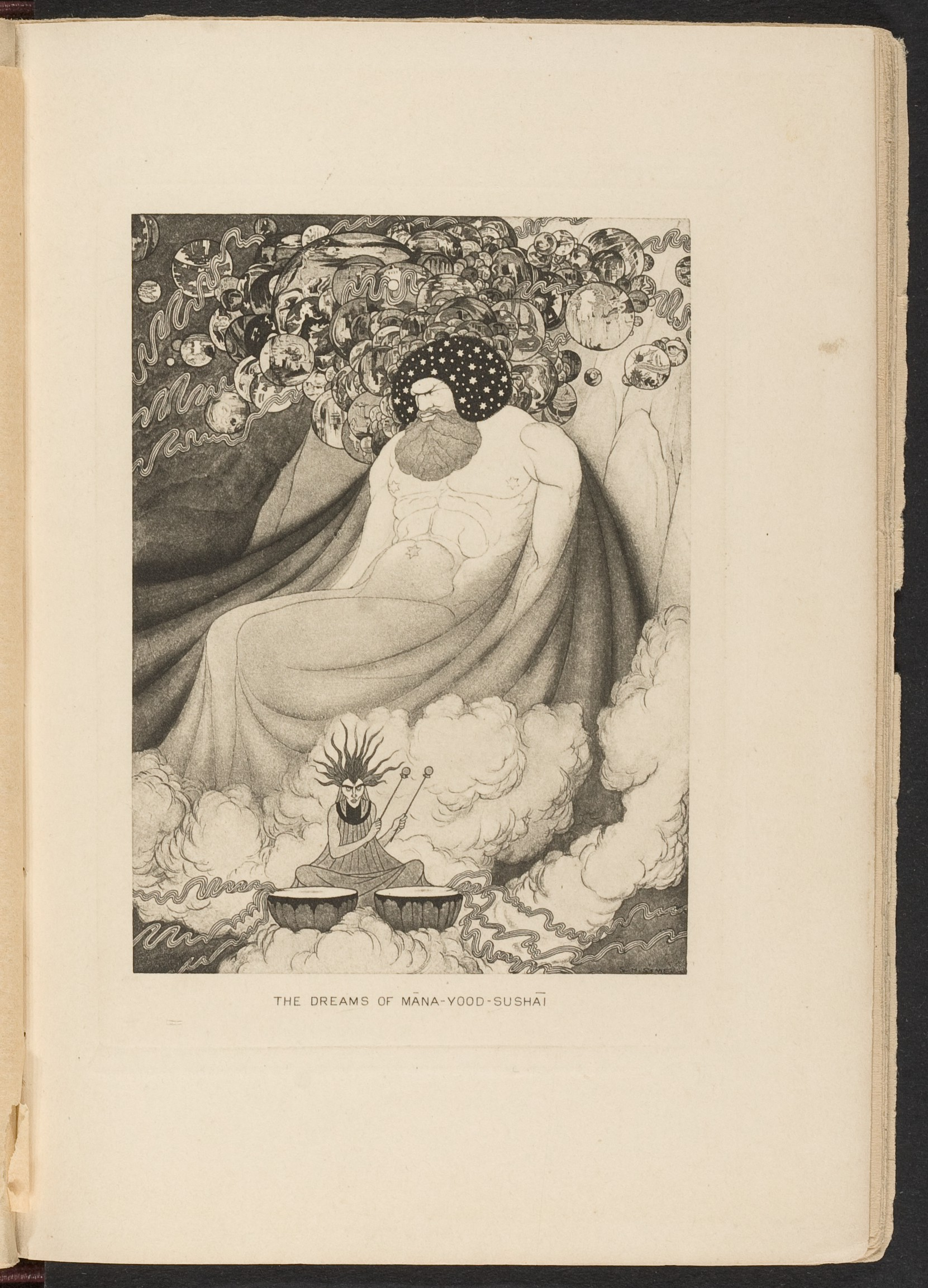
Illustration by S. H. Sime from the 1911 Pegana Press edition

=== Māna-Yood-Sushāī ===
The chief of the gods of Pegāna is Māna-Yood-Sushāī, who created the other gods and then fell asleep. When he wakes, he "will make again new gods and other worlds, and will destroy the gods whom he hath made". Men may pray to "all the gods but one"; only the gods themselves may pray to Māna-Yood-Sushāī.

=== Skarl the Drummer ===
After Māna-Yood-Sushāī "made the gods and Skarl", Skarl made a drum and beat on it in order to lull his creator to sleep; he keeps drumming eternally, for "if he cease for an instant, then Māna-Yood-Sushāī will start to awake, and there will be worlds nor gods no more". Dunsany writes that:

Some say that the Worlds and the Suns are but the echoes of the drumming of Skarl, and others say that they be dreams that arise in the mind of Mana because of the drumming of Skarl, as one may dream whose rest is troubled by sound of song, but none knoweth, for who hath heard the voice of Māna-Yood-Sushāī, or who hath seen his drummer?

=== The small gods ===
Besides Māna-Yood-Sushāī, there are numerous other gods in Pegāna's pantheon, known as the small gods:

- Kib, the Sender of Life in all the Worlds. The god of beasts and men.
- Sish, the Destroyer of Hours. The god of time.
- Mung, Lord of all Deaths between Pegāna and the Rim. The god of death.
- Slid, whose Soul is by the Sea. The god of waters.
- Limpang-Tung, the God of Mirth and of Melodious Minstrels.
- Yoharneth-Lahai, the God of Little Dreams and Fancies.
- Roon, the God of Going and the Thousand Home Gods.
- Dorozhand, whose Eyes Regard the End. The god of destiny.
- Hoodrazai, the mirthless god who knows the secret of Māna-Yood-Sushāī. It is said that Ranorada, the eye in the waste, is carved in his image.
- Sirami, the Lord of All Forgetting
- Mosahn, the Bird of Doom
- Grimbol, Zeebol and Trehagobol, the three goddesses of the tallest mountains, mothers of the three (once) rebellious river gods.

=== The thousand home gods ===
According to Roon, the God of Going: "There are a thousand home gods, the little gods that sit before the hearth and mind the fire – there is one Roon". These home gods include:

- Pitsu, who strokes the cat
- Hobith, who calms the dog
- Habaniah, the lord of glowing embers
- little Zumbiboo, the lord of dust
- old Gribaun, who sits in the heart of the fire to turn the wood to ash
- Kilooloogung, the lord of arising smoke
- Jabim, the Lord of broken things
- Triboogie, the Lord of Dusk
- Hish, the Lord of Silence
- Wohoon, the Lord of Noises in the Night
- Eimēs, Zānēs, and Segástrion, the (once) rebellious lords of the three rivers of the plain
- Umbool, the Lord of the Drought
- Araxes, Zadres, and Hyraglion, stars in the south
- Ingazi, Yo, and Mindo, stars to the north

=== Trogool, neither god nor beast ===
Trogool is the mysterious thing set at the very south pole of the cosmos, whose duty is to turn over the pages of a great book, in which history writes itself every day until the end of the world. The fully written pages are "black", meaning the night, and when each one is turned, then the white page symbolizes a new day. Trogool never answers prayer, and the pages that have been turned shall never be turned back, neither by him nor by anyone else.

Its description says: "Trogool is the Thing that men in many countries have called by many names, It is the Thing that sits behind the gods, whose book is the Scheme of Things".

== Publication history ==
The book was first published, on a commission basis, in London, 1905, by Elkin Mathews, with a second edition by The Pegana Press in 1911, and a third edition, again by Mathews, in 1919. Aside from its various stand-alone editions, the complete text of the collection is included in the Ballantine Adult Fantasy collection Beyond the Fields We Know (1972), in The Complete Pegāna (1998), and in the Gollancz Fantasy Masterworks omnibus Time and the Gods (2000).

== Reception ==
=== Contemporary ===
A 1905 review in The Irish Independent called The Gods of Pegāna "a strange and decidedly remarkable book, cleverly but weirdly illustrated", and commented that the reader would have to decide for themselves whether or not the stories had any satirical intent.

In his New York Times review, John Corbin described Dunsany's debut collection as:

an attempt to create an Olympus of his own and people it with an assemblage of deities, each with a personality and a power over human life acutely conceived and visualized ... To me, [the collection] is autobiography, and all the more self-revealing because it is profoundly unconscious. As an achievement of the imagination ... this bible of the gods of Pegana is simply amazing.

=== Retrospective ===
Gahan Wilson praised The Gods of Pegāna as

"a wonderfully sustained exercise in totally ironic fantasy which may never be beaten. Speaking in a highly original mix of King James Bible English, Yeatsian syntax, and Scheherazadian imagery, [Dunsany] introduces us to a wonderfully sinister Valhalla populated with mad, spectacularly cruel and wonderfully silly gods ... whose only genuine amusement appears to derive from the inventive damage they inflict upon their misbegotten worshippers". E.F. Bleiler lauded the collection as "a convincing, marvelous creation of an alien cosmology".

Noting that Dunsany was reading Nietzsche at the time he was writing The Gods of Pegāna, S.T. Joshi declared it

"... an instantiation of the quintessential act of fantasy: The creation of a new world. Dunsany has simply carried the procedure one step further than any of his conceivable predecessors – W.T. Beckford (Vathek), William Morris with his medieval fantasies – by inventing an entire cosmogony ... Dunsany embodies his new realm with his own philosophical predilections, and these predilections – although expressed in the most gorgeously evocative of prose-poetry – are of a very modern, even radical sort".

== Sources ==
- Bleiler, Everett (1948). The Checklist of Fantastic Literature. Chicago: Shasta Publishers. p. 104.
