= A Dreamer's Tales =

Book of fantasy stories by Lord Dunsany (1910)

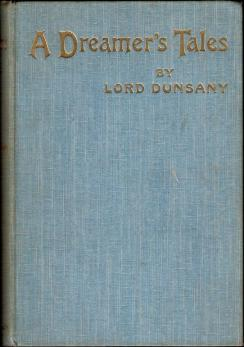
- First edition
- Author: Lord Dunsany
- Illustrator: Sidney Sime
- Language: English
- Genre: Fantasy
- Publisher: George Allen & Sons
- Publication date: 1910
- Publication place: UK
- Media type: Print (hardback)
- Preceded by: The Sword of Welleran and Other Stories
- Followed by: The Book of Wonder

A Dreamer's Tales is the fourth book by Irish fantasy writer Lord Dunsany, considered a major influence on the work of J. R. R. Tolkien, H. P. Lovecraft, Ursula K. Le Guin, and others. Like most of Dunsany's early books, A Dreamer's Tales is a collection of fantasy short stories.

A Dreamer's Tales was first published in hardcover by George Allen & Sons in September 1910, and has been reprinted a number of times since. It was issued by the Modern Library in a combined edition with The Sword of Welleran and Other Stories as A Dreamer's Tales and Other Stories in 1917. This edition included an introduction by Padraic Colum praising Dunsany's feel for dramatic situations and exalted speech, and stating that his main influences were Homer, Herodotus, and the Bible.

== Contents ==
- "Preface"
- "Poltarnees, Beholder of Ocean"
- "Blagdaross"
- "The Madness of Andelsprutz"
- "Where the Tides Ebb and Flow"
- "Bethmoora"
- "Idle Days on the Yann"
- "The Sword and the Idol"
- "The Idle City"
- "The Hashish Man"
- "Poor Old Bill"
- "The Beggars"
- "Carcassonne"
- "In Zaccarath"
- "The Field"
- "The Day of the Poll"
- "The Unhappy Body"

== Summaries ==
=== Poltarnees, Beholder of Ocean ===
In this story there is a mountain of which, if any man climbs, they never return; many have promised to come back after looking over the peak, but none have returned. There is one woman whose beauty is such that (in theory) a man would come back if promised her hand in marriage. So a man is sent to look over the mountain.

=== Blagdaross ===
"On a waste place strewn with bricks in the outskirts of a town", several objects (an old cork, an unstruck match, a broken kettle, a piece of cord/rope, and an old rocking-horse) tell their life stories.

=== The Madness of Andelsprutz ===
A tale in which a man visits a city and engages in conversation with two men as to whether or not the city of Andelsprutz is dead or was never alive then one of the men tells a tale of the city and how all cities have souls; he knows because he saw Andelsprutz's soul and engaged in a conversation with her.

=== Where the Tides Ebb and Flow ===
A story from the perspective of a dead body and what it experiences.

=== Bethmoora ===
A narrator tells the background of the desolate and abandoned city of Bethmoora. The city was abandoned abruptly for mysterious reasons, possibly a warning from the gods, a message from an emperor, disease or the desert. Bethmoora is brought up again in the later story, The Hashish Man.

=== The Sword and the Idol ===
A tale of early humans. Loz invents an iron sword and comes to rule the tribe. Generations later, when Loz's descendant Lod is chief, Ird introduces religion to the tribe in the form of the worship of Ged. A battle of wills between Lod and Ird ends with Lod giving the sword to Ird.

=== The Idle City ===
Four short short stories told to gain entry to the Idle City.

=== The Hashish Man ===
The narrator of "Bethmoora" meets a man at a party who has visited the city more recently with the aid of hashish. He tells the narrator the city was abandoned at the order of emperor Thuba Mleen of Utnar Vehi. He describes some of the horrors of Thuba Mleen before fleeing the party to stay ahead of the police.

=== Poor Old Bill ===
A tale of a terrible pirate captain, whose crew maroon him. Unfortunately, while he lives his curses still have magical power, and prevent them from entering any harbor.

=== The Beggars ===
A daydream of cheerful beggars in lordly cloaks, who find goodness and fortune in everything.

=== Carcassonne ===
After a prophecy given to a king that he will never set foot in the city of Carcassonne, the heroes of the court vow to conquer the city, the location of which is unknown.

=== In Zaccarath ===
The king of Zacarath calls for prophecies. The prophets foretell doom, but the king and all of his court hear only tales that tell of everlasting Zacarath. At the end the narrator finds a rock that may once have been part of the marvellous palace of Zacarath.

=== The Field ===
The narrator finds a field of flowers that seems to have a malevolence about it. He questions a poet, who informs him it is a battlefield.

=== The Day of the Poll ===
A poet kidnaps a voter on election day, and tries to get him to see the beauty and glamour in the world.

=== The Unhappy Body ===
A story about a body forced to work for a living, while the soul strives for poetry.

== Influence ==
In a 1973 essay, "A Citizen of Mondath", Ursula Le Guin described discovering and reading Dunsany's book A Dreamer's Tales as a child. Le Guin wrote that Dunsany's book "came to me as a revelation" and called Dunsany a "liberator" for her imagination.

== Sources ==
- Joshi, S. T. (1993). Lord Dunsany: a Bibliography / by S. T. Joshi and Darrell Schweitzer. Metuchen, N.J.: The Scarecrow Press, Inc. p. 3.
