= Sidney Sime =

English artist (1867–1941)

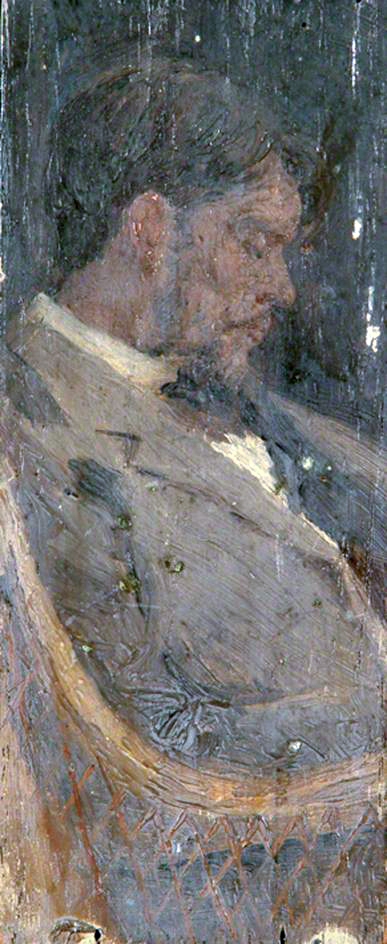
Self portrait

Sidney Herbert Sime (/siːm/; 1865 – 22 May 1941) — he usually signed his works as S. H. Sime — was an early 20th century English artist, mostly remembered for his fantastic and satirical artwork, especially his story illustrations for Anglo-Irish fantasy author Lord Dunsany.

== Life ==
=== Early life ===
Sime was born in Hulme, Manchester in poverty in 1865. A five-year career in the Yorkshire coal mines as a "scoop pusher" was attended by a number of horrific accidents including one in which he almost lost his life. There followed work at a linen shop, a barbers, and as a signwriter (setting up in his own right); finally he studied at the Liverpool School of Art. During his time at Liverpool, he won several awards.

=== Publishing ===
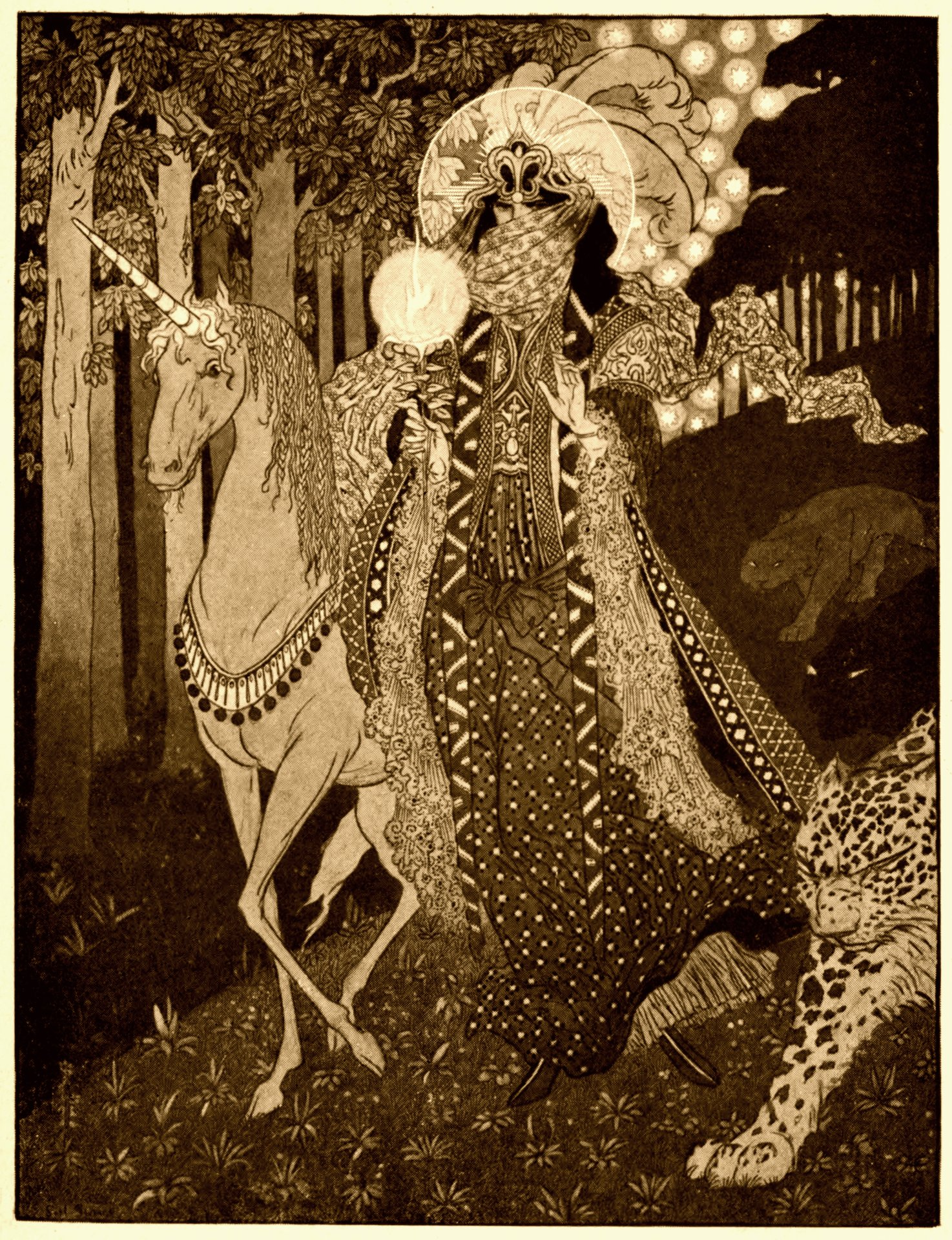
Romance Comes Down Out of Hilly Woodlands, illustration for "Poltarnees, Beholder of Ocean" in Lord Dunsany's A Dreamer's Tales

Sime quickly became famous for drawings and illustrations with fantastic themes, with a presence in Pick-Me-Up, The Idler and the Pall Mall Gazette. The fantastic treatment often masked biting satire, especially aimed at the rich and at politicians.

He received an inheritance from an uncle and bought The Idler, but sold out within two years.

=== Dunsany ===
In 1904, Sime was approached by the author for whom he is most often remembered, the Irish Lord Dunsany, to illustrate his first book, The Gods of Pegāna, published in 1905. This began an association which lasted for the rest of his life, with his illustrations especially prominent in Dunsany's earlier work (until c. 1922). For one volume, at least some of the stories were inspired by Sime works (The Book of Wonder), and for three, in special limited editions, each plate of illustration was signed by the artist.

=== Drama and exhibitions ===
Sime, who had produced a play with limited success in 1905, did both scenery and costume work for a number of productions, and had exhibitions in 1923 and 1927. In his later years, he produced less work but more in colour, his earlier work having been almost exclusively monochrome.

=== Later life ===
Sime also contributed frontispieces to The Ghost Pirates by William Hope Hodgson and The House of Souls by Arthur Machen.

Sime died on 22 May 1941 and was buried in St Mary's churchyard in Worplesdon, Surrey. His widow Mary preserved many of his remaining works, which on her death were willed to form The Sime Gallery in the Memorial Hall in Worplesdon near Guildford, Surrey.

== Legacy ==
Today, Sime is best remembered for his work with Lord Dunsany.

At least four collections of Sime's work have been published, though none are in print today.

Illustrator Roger Dean is among many who cite him as an influence. Writer H. P. Lovecraft was also a fan of his (mentioning the artist in the stories "Pickman's Model" and "The Call of Cthulhu") as was Howard de Walden.

The Sime Gallery is still extant in the village of Worplesdon near Guildford but the most famous collections of Sime work belonged to Lord Dunsany and Howard de Walden. The latter is unavailable, and it is believed many were lost in a fire. However, the Dunsany collection, including all the originals of Sime's work for Lord Dunsany, plus a few other pieces, and notably with several in colour, can be viewed by arrangement at Dunsany Castle in County Meath, Ireland.
