= Lord Dunsany =

Anglo-Irish writer and dramatist (1878–1957)

The Right Honourable The Lord Dunsany FRSL FRGS
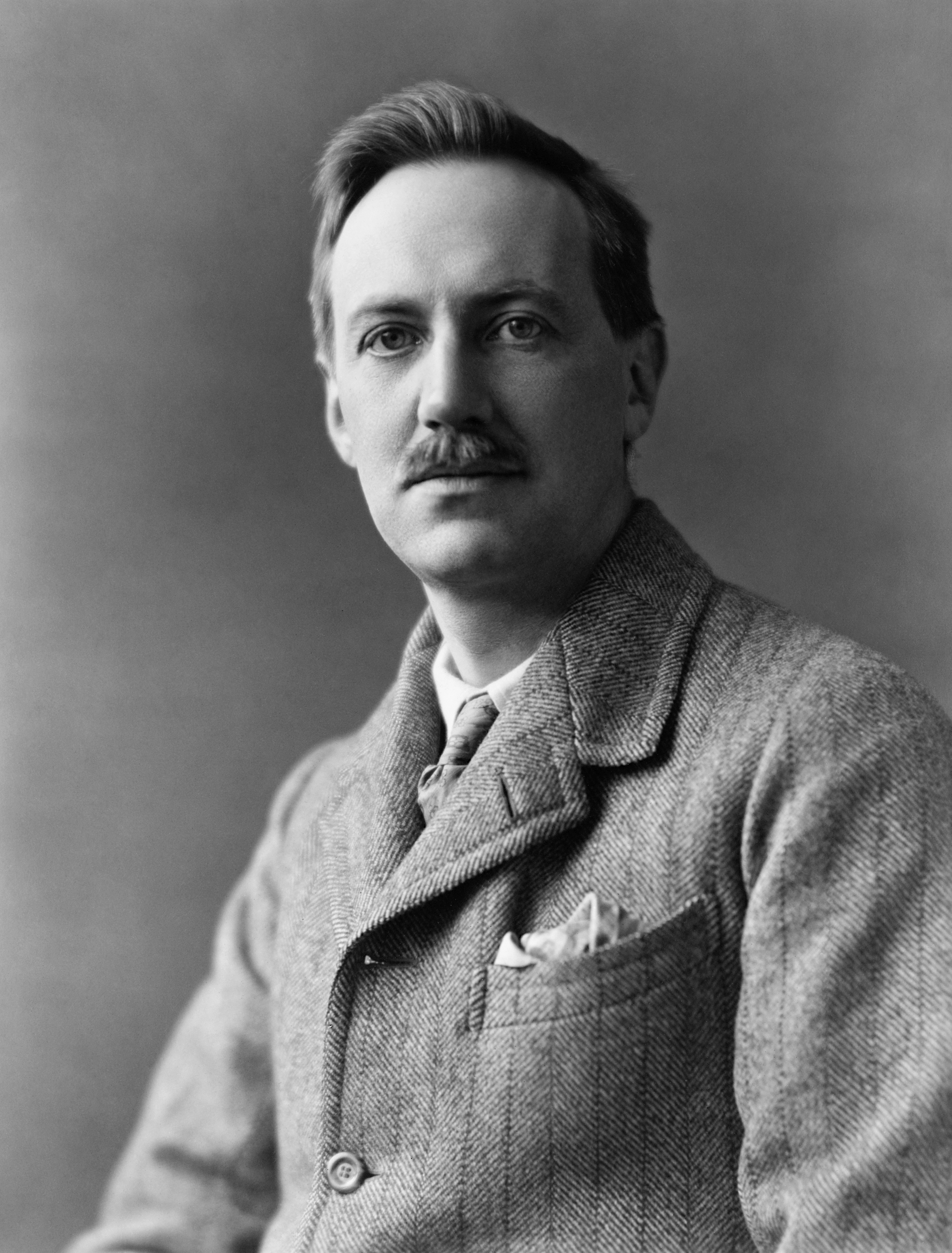
- Dunsany in 1919
- Born: Edward John Moreton Drax Plunkett; 24 July 1878; London, England
- Died: 25 October 1957 (aged 79); Dublin, Ireland
- Occupations: Writer (short story writer, playwright, novelist, poet)
- Spouse: Lady Beatrice Child Villiers (m. 1904)
- Children: 1
- Parent: John Plunkett, 17th Baron Dunsany (father)
- Relatives: Reginald Drax (brother)
- Writing career
- Language: English
- Period: 1890–1957
- Genres: High fantasy, crime, horror, science fiction, weird fiction
- Notable works: The King of Elfland's Daughter, The Gods of Pegāna
- Notable awards: Harmsworth Award
- Military career
- Service: British Army, Irish Army
- Rank: Captain
- Units: Coldstream Guards, Royal Inniskilling Fusiliers, Irish Army Reserve, British Home Guard
- Conflicts: Easter Rising, Battle of Britain

Edward John Moreton Drax Plunkett, 18th Baron Dunsany (/dʌnˈseɪni/; 24 July 1878 – 25 October 1957), commonly known as Lord Dunsany, was an Anglo-Irish writer and dramatist. He published more than 90 books during his lifetime, (Note: Canavan states "He published more than 80 books".) (Note: However, Lord Dunsany: A Comprehensive Bibliography gives a full listing of Dunsany's own works catalogued as "I.A." numbers, the last issued within author's lifetime being #92 (I.A. 92) The Sword of Welleran and Other Tales of Enchantment (1954).) (Note: The total number of books (including posthumously published) numbers up to I.A. #121 as of 2012.) and his output consisted of hundreds of short stories, plays, novels, and essays; further works were published posthumously. Having gained a name in the 1910s as a writer in the English-speaking world, he is best known today for the 1924 fantasy novel The King of Elfland's Daughter, and his first book, The Gods of Pegāna, which depicts a fictional pantheon. Many critics feel his early work laid the grounds for the fantasy genre.

Born in London as heir to one of the oldest Irish peerages, he was raised partly in Kent, but later lived mainly at Dunsany Castle near Tara, Ireland. He worked with W. B. Yeats and Lady Gregory, and supported the Abbey Theatre and some fellow writers. He was a chess and pistol champion of Ireland, and travelled and hunted. He devised an asymmetrical game called Dunsany's chess. In later life, he was awarded an honorary doctorate from Trinity College Dublin. He settled in Shoreham, Kent, in 1947. In 1957 he took ill when visiting Ireland and died in Dublin of appendicitis.

== Biography ==
=== Early life ===
Edward Plunkett (Dunsany), known to his family as "Eddie", was the first son of John William Plunkett, 17th Baron of Dunsany, and his wife, Ernle Elizabeth Louisa Maria Grosvenor Ernle-Erle-Drax (née Burton). Born into a historically wealthy and famous family, Lord Dunsany was related to many well-known Irish figures. He was a kinsman of the Catholic Saint Oliver Plunkett, the martyred Archbishop of Armagh whose ring and crozier head are still held by the Dunsany family. He was also related to the prominent Anglo-Irish unionist and later nationalist / Home Rule politician Sir Horace Plunkett and George Count Plunkett, Papal Count and Republican politician, father of Joseph Plunkett, executed for his part in the 1916 Rising.

His mother was a cousin of Sir Richard Burton, and he inherited from her considerable height, being 1.93 metres tall (6'4"). The Countess of Fingall, wife of Dunsany's cousin, the Earl of Fingall, wrote a best-selling account of the life of the aristocracy in Ireland in the late 19th century and early 20th century called Seventy Years Young.

Plunkett's only adult sibling, a younger brother, from whom he was estranged from about 1916, for reasons not fully clear but connected to his mother's will, was the noted British naval officer Sir Reginald Drax. Another younger brother died in infancy.

Edward Plunkett grew up at the family properties, notably Dunstall Priory in Shoreham, Kent, and Dunsany Castle in County Meath, but also in family homes such as in London. His schooling was at Cheam, Eton College and the Royal Military College, Sandhurst, which he entered in 1896.

=== Title and marriage ===
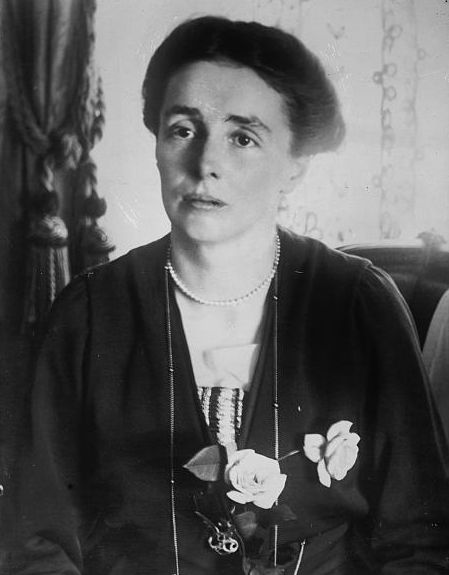
Beatrice Child Villiers, Lady Dunsany

The title passed to him at his father's death in 1899 at a fairly young age. The young Lord Dunsany returned to Dunsany Castle after war duty, in 1901. In that year he was also confirmed as an elector for the Irish representative peers in the House of Lords.

In 1903, he met Lady Beatrice Child Villiers (1880–1970), youngest daughter of The 7th Earl of Jersey (head of the Jersey banking family), who was then living at Osterley Park. They married in 1904. Their one child, Randal, was born in 1906. Lady Beatrice was supportive of Dunsany's interests and helped him by typing his manuscripts, selecting work for his collections, including the 1954 retrospective short story collection, and overseeing his literary heritage after his death.

The Dunsanys were socially active in Dublin and London and travelled between homes in Meath, London and Kent, other than during the First and Second world wars and the Irish War of Independence. Dunsany circulated with many literary figures of the time. To many of these in Ireland he was first introduced by his uncle, the co-operative pioneer Sir Horace Plunkett, who also helped to manage his estate and investments for a time. He was friendly, for example, with George William Russell, Oliver St. John Gogarty, and for a time, W. B. Yeats. He also socialised at times with George Bernard Shaw and H. G. Wells, and was a friend of Rudyard Kipling.

In 1910 Dunsany commissioned a two-storey extension to Dunsany Castle, with a billiard room, bedrooms and other facilities. The billiard room includes a large coat of arms above the fireplace and the heraldic shields of the first eighteen Lords Dunsany combined with those of their wives.

=== Military experience ===
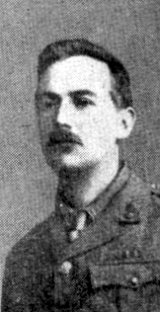
Dunsany as captain, Royal Inniskilling Fusiliers, in the First World War

Dunsany served as a second lieutenant in the Coldstream Guards in the Second Boer War. Volunteering in the First World War and appointed Captain in the Royal Inniskilling Fusiliers, he was stationed for a time at Ebrington Barracks in Derry. Hearing while on leave of disturbances in Dublin during the Easter Rising of 1916, he drove in to offer help and was wounded by a bullet lodged in his skull. After recovery at Jervis Street Hospital and what was then the King George V Hospital (now St. Bricin's Military Hospital), he returned to duty. His military belt was lost in the episode and later used at the burial of Michael Collins. Having been refused forward positioning in 1916 and listed as valuable as a trainer, he served in the later war stages in the trenches and in the final period writing propaganda material for the War Office with MI7b(1). There is a book at Dunsany Castle with wartime photographs, on which lost members of his command are marked.

During the Irish War of Independence, Dunsany was charged with violating the Restoration of Order in Ireland Regulations, tried by court-martial on 4 February 1921, convicted, and sentenced to pay a fine of 25 pounds or serve three months in prison without labour. The Crown Forces had searched Dunsany Castle and had found two double-barrelled shotguns, two rook rifles, four Very pistols, an automatic pistol and a large quantity of pistol ammunition, along with shotgun and rifle ammunition.

During the Second World War, Dunsany signed up for the Irish Army Reserve and the British Home Guard, the two countries' local defence forces, and was especially active in Shoreham, Kent, the English village bombed most during the Battle of Britain.

=== Literary life ===
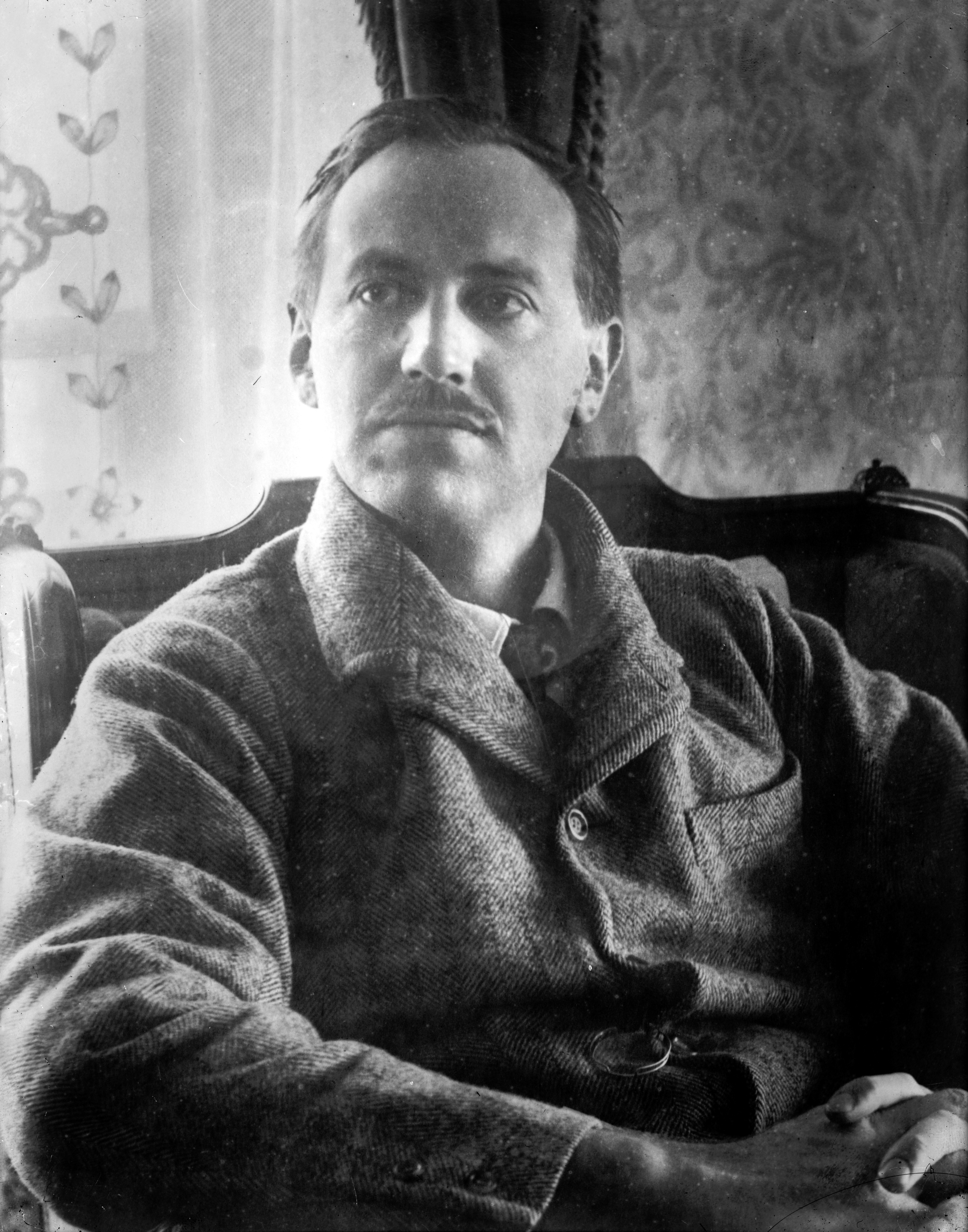
Photograph of Dunsany from the Bain News Service

Dunsany's fame arose chiefly from his prolific writings. He was involved in the Irish Literary Revival. Supporting the Revival, Dunsany was a major donor to the Abbey Theatre and he moved in Irish literary circles. He was well acquainted with W. B. Yeats (who rarely acted as editor but gathered and published a Dunsany selection), Lady Gregory, Percy French, George "AE" Russell, Oliver St John Gogarty, Padraic Colum (with whom he jointly wrote a play) and others. He befriended and supported Francis Ledwidge, to whom he gave the use of his library, and Mary Lavin.

Dunsany made his first literary tour to the United States in 1919 and further such visits up to the 1950s, in the early years mostly to the eastern seaboard and later, notably, to California.

Dunsany's own work and contribution to the Irish literary heritage were recognised with an honorary degree from Trinity College Dublin.

=== Early 1940s ===
In 1940, Dunsany was appointed Byron Professor of English in Athens University, Greece. Having reached Athens by a circuitous route, he was so successful that he was offered a post as Professor of English in Istanbul. However, he had to be evacuated due to the German invasion of Greece in April 1941, returning home by an even more complex route, his travels forming a basis for a long poem published in book form (A Journey, in 5 cantos: The Battle of Britain, The Battle of Greece, The Battle of the Mediterranean, Battles Long Ago, The Battle of the Atlantic, special edition January 1944). Olivia Manning's character Lord Pinkrose in her novel sequence the Fortunes of War was a mocking portrait of Dunsany in that period.

=== Later life ===
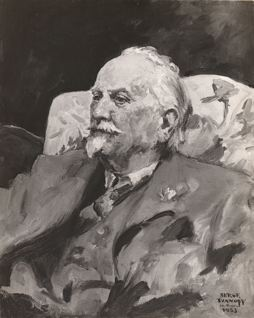
Portrait of Lord Dunsany by Serge Ivanoff, San Francisco, 1953

In 1947, Dunsany transferred his Meath estate in trust to his son and heir Randal and settled in Kent at his Shoreham house, Dunstall Priory. He visited Ireland only occasionally thereafter, and engaged actively in life in Shoreham and London. He also began a new series of visits to the United States, notably California, as recounted in Hazel Littlefield-Smith's biographical Dunsany, King of Dreams.

=== Death ===
In 1957, Lord Dunsany became ill while dining with the Earl and Countess of Fingall at Dunsany, in what proved to be an attack of appendicitis. He died in hospital in Dublin, at the age of 79. He was buried in the churchyard of the ancient church of St Peter and St Paul, Shoreham, Kent. His funeral was attended by many family members (including Pakenhams, Jerseys and Fingalls), representatives of his old regiment and various bodies in which he had taken an interest, and figures from Shoreham. A memorial service was held at Kilmessan in Meath, with a reading of "Crossing the Bar", which coincided with the passing of a flock of geese.

Beatrice survived Dunsany, living mainly at Shoreham and overseeing his literary legacy until her death in 1970. Their son Randal succeeded to the barony and was in turn succeeded by his own son, the artist Edward Plunkett. Dunsany's literary rights passed from Beatrice to Edward.

=== Interests ===
Aside from his literary work, Dunsany was a keen chess player, setting chess puzzles for journals such as The Times of London, playing José Raúl Capablanca to a draw in a simultaneous exhibition, and inventing Dunsany's Chess, an asymmetrical chess variant notable for not involving any fairy pieces, unlike the many variants that require the player to learn unconventional piece movements. He was president of both the Irish Chess Union and the Kent County Chess Association for some years and of Sevenoaks Chess Club for 54 years. His short story The Three Sailors' Gambit is a classic work of suspense that incorporates a strong and unique chess element into its plot.

Dunsany was an avid horseman and hunter, for many years hosting the hounds of a local hunt and hunting in parts of Africa. He was at one time the pistol-shooting champion of Ireland. Dunsany also campaigned for animal rights, being known especially for his opposition to the "docking" of dogs' tails, and presided over the West Kent branch of the RSPCA in his later years. He enjoyed cricket, provided the local cricket ground situated near Dunsany Crossroads, and later played for and presided at Shoreham Cricket Club in Kent. He was a supporter of Scouting for many years, serving as President of the Sevenoaks district Boy Scouts Association. He also supported an amateur drama group, the Shoreham Players.

Dunsany provided support for the British Legion in both Ireland and Kent, including grounds in Trim and poetry for the Irish branch's annual memorial service on a number of occasions.

== Writings ==
Dunsany was a prolific writer of short stories, novels, plays, poetry, essays and autobiography. He published over 90 books in his lifetime, not including individual plays. Books have continued to appear, with more than 120 having been issued by 2017. Dunsany's works have been published in many languages.

=== Early career ===
Dunsany began his literary career in the late 1890s writing under his given name, with published verses such as "Rhymes from a Suburb" and "The Spirit of the Bog". In 1905, writing as Lord Dunsany, he produced the well-received collection The Gods of Pegāna.

=== Early fantasy ===
Dunsany's most notable fantasy short stories appeared in collections from 1905 to 1919, before fantasy had been recognised as a distinct genre. He paid for the publication of the first collection, The Gods of Pegāna, earning a commission on sales.

The stories in his first two books, and perhaps the beginning of his third, were set in an invented world, Pegāna, with its own gods, history and geography. Starting with this, Dunsany's name is linked to that of Sidney Sime, his chosen artist, who illustrated much of his work, notably up to 1922.

=== Drama ===
After The Book of Wonder (1912), Dunsany began to write plays – many of which were even more successful at the time than his early story collections – while continuing to write short stories. He carried on writing plays for the theatre into the 1930s, including the famous If (1921), and also some radio productions.

Although many of Dunsany's plays were successfully staged in his lifetime, he also wrote "chamber plays" or closet dramas. Some of these chamber or radio plays involve supernatural events – a character appearing out of thin air or vanishing in full view of the audience, without an explanation of how the effect is to be staged, a matter of no importance, as Dunsany did not intend them to be performed live.

=== Middle period ===
After a successful lecture tour to the United States in 1919 and 1920, Dunsany's reputation was now related principally to his plays. He temporarily reduced his output of short stories, concentrating on plays, novels and poetry for a time. His poetry, now little seen, was for a time so popular that it is recited by the lead character of F. Scott Fitzgerald's This Side of Paradise. His sonnet "A Dirge of Victory" was the only poem included in the Armistice Day edition of the Times of London.

Launching another phase of his work, Dunsany's first novel, Don Rodriguez: Chronicles of Shadow Valley appeared in 1922. It is set in "a Romantic Spain that never was" and follows the adventures of a young nobleman, Don Rodriguez, and his servant in their search for a castle for Rodriguez. In 1924, Dunsany published his second novel, The King of Elfland's Daughter, a return to his early style of writing. In his next novel, The Charwoman's Shadow, Dunsany returned to the Spanish milieu and the light style of Don Rodriguez.

Among his best-known characters was Joseph Jorkens, an obese, middle-aged raconteur who frequented the fictional Billiards Club in London and would tell fantastic stories if anyone bought him a large whiskey and soda. From his tales, it was clear that Jorkens had travelled to all seven continents, was extremely resourceful and well-versed in world cultures, but always came up short on becoming rich and famous. The Jorkens books, which sold well, were among the first of a type that would become popular in fantasy and science fiction writing: highly improbable "club tales" told at a gentleman's club or bar.

Some saw Dunsany's writing habits as peculiar. Lady Beatrice said, "He always sat on a crumpled old hat while composing his tales". (The hat was eventually stolen by a visitor to Dunsany Castle.) Dunsany almost never rewrote anything; everything he published was a first draft. Much of his work was written with a quill pen he made himself; Lady Beatrice was usually the first to see the writings and would help to type them. It has been said that Lord Dunsany sometimes conceived stories while hunting and would return to the Castle and draw in his family and servants to re-enact his visions before he set them on paper.

=== Translations ===
Dunsany's work was translated from early on into languages that include Spanish, French, Japanese, German, Italian, Dutch, Russian, Czech and Turkish – his uncle, Horace Plunkett, suggested 14 languages by the 1920s.

=== Style and themes ===
Dunsany's style varied significantly throughout his writing career. Prominent Dunsany scholar S. T. Joshi has described these shifts as Dunsany moving on after he felt he had exhausted the potential of a style or medium. From the naïve fantasy of his earliest writings, through his early short-story work in 1904–1908, he turned to the self-conscious fantasy of The Book of Wonder in 1912, in which he almost seems to be parodying his lofty early style.

Each of his collections varies in mood; A Dreamer's Tales varies from the wistfulness of "Blagdaross" to the horrors of "Poor Old Bill" and "Where the Tides Ebb and Flow" to the social satire of "The Day of the Poll." The opening paragraph of "The Hoard of the Gibbelins" from The Book of Wonder, (1912) gives a good indication of both the tone and tenor of Dunsany's style at the time:

The Gibbelins eat, as is well known, nothing less good than man. Their evil tower is joined to Terra Cognita, to the lands we know, by a bridge. Their hoard is beyond reason; avarice has no use for it; they have a separate cellar for emeralds and a separate cellar for sapphires; they have filled a hole with gold and dig it up when they need it. And the only use that is known for their ridiculous wealth is to attract to their larder a continual supply of food. In times of famine, they have even been known to scatter rubies abroad, a little trail of them to some city of Man, and sure enough, their larders would soon be full again.

Despite his frequent shifts of style and medium, Dunsany's thematic concerns remained essentially the same. Many of his later novels had an explicitly Irish theme, from the semi-autobiographical The Curse of the Wise Woman to His Fellow Men.

In his 1951 essay "Kafka and his Precursors", Jorge Luis Borges points out that Dunsany's short story "Carcassonne" resembles Franz Kafka's novel The Castle, which was written later. According to Borges the story is about "An invincible army of warriors departs from an infinite castle, subjugates kingdoms and sees monsters and crosses deserts and mountains, but never reaches Carcassonne, although they once catch a glimpse of it."

== Dramatisations and media ==
=== Theatre ===
- Most of Dunsany's plays were performed in his lifetime, some many times in many venues, including the West End, Broadway and Off-Broadway. At one time, five ran simultaneously in New York, possibly all on Broadway, On another occasion he was being performed in four European capitals as well as New York.

=== Radio ===
- Dunsany wrote several plays for radio, most being broadcast on the BBC and some collected in Plays for Earth and Air. The BBC had recordings of the broadcasts but, according to articles on the author, these are not extant.
- Dunsany is known to have read short stories and poetry on air and for private recording by Hazel Littlefield-Smith and friends in California. It is thought that one or two of these recordings survive.
- The successful film It Happened Tomorrow was later adapted for radio.
- The radio drama Fortress of Doom (2005) in the Radio Tales series is an adaptation of Dunsany's short story "The Fortress Unvanquishable, Save for Sacnoth".

=== Television ===
- Dunsany appeared on early television several times, notably on The Brains Trust (reaching over a quarter of the UK population), but no recordings are known to exist.
- A 1946 BBC production of A Night at an Inn starred Oliver Burt.
- A half-hour dramatisation of A Night at an Inn, starring Boris Karloff, adapted from Dunsany's play by Halsted Welles and directed by Robert Stevens, was produced for Suspense and aired in April 1949.
- In 1952, Four Star Playhouse presented The Lost Silk Hat, directed by Robert Florey and starring Ronald Colman, who also collaborated with Milton Merli on the script.
- An adaptation of The Pirates of the Round Pond was aired as The Pirates of Central Park in 2001.
- A dramatised reading of Charon appeared in the USA TV series Fantasmagori, 2017.

=== Cinema ===
- The critically and commercially successful 1944 film It Happened Tomorrow, nominated for two Oscars, credited "The Jest of Hahalaba" as one of its sources.
- The short In the Twilight, a 15-minute colour production from a short story of that name, directed by Digby Rumsey, was showcased in the mid-1970s at the London Film Festival.
- The short Nature and Time, a 1976 colour production from a short story of that name, directed by Digby Rumsey, starred Helen York and Paul Goodchild.
- The 22-minute colour film The Pledge, from the short story "The Highwayman", directed by Digby Rumsey, was released by Fantasy Films in 1981 and distributed by Twentieth Century Fox, with music by Michael Nyman.
- The 2008 film Dean Spanley, adapted by Alan Sharp from the novella My Talks With Dean Spanley, directed by Toa Fraser and produced by Matthew Metcalfe and Alan Harris, starred Peter O'Toole, Sam Neill, Jeremy Northam and Bryan Brown.
- George Pal optioned the science fiction novel The Last Revolution in the 1960s. The short story "Charon" and the novel The King of Elfland's Daughter were among others optioned at various times, but none are believed to have reached production. Granada TV also bought options or rights for certain stories.
- According to David Scott Diffrient, the 1998 British-US romantic comedy drama film Sliding Doors, with some similar plot points, directed by Peter Howitt, also had a Dunsanian link with that material and with If.

=== Text readings ===
- Dunsany performed a number of live readings, notably of poetry and extracts from plays, in New York and California.
- An extract from Time and the Gods was used to accompany a video published for a relaunch of the Museum of Literature Ireland (MoLI) in Dublin.

=== Music ===
- Eduardo Bort was inspired by "Idle Days on the Yann" for his debut album Eduardo Bort (1975), especially for the lyrics of the tracks "Yann", "En las riberas del Yann" and the bonus track "En las fuentes del Yann".
- In 1977, Peter Knight and Bob Johnson, two members of Steeleye Span, recorded a concept album based on Dunsany's The King of Elfland's Daughter, released by Chrysalis Records on LP and later on CD. The album starred Christopher Lee.
- An adaptation of "The Fortress Unvanquishable, Save for Sacnoth" was made by Destiny's End in 1998.
- An interpretation of The King of Elfland's Daughter was released by the metal band Falcon in 2008

=== Audiobooks ===
- An LP of Vincent Price reading a number of Dunsany short stories appeared in the 1980s.
- Several Dunsany short stories have been published as audiobooks in Germany and played on the German national railway, Deutsche Bahn (DB).
- Works by Lord Dunsany at LibriVox (public domain audiobooks)
- The Little Tales of Smethers and Other Stories were published in the UK and US in 2017.
- A set of short stories set to music, The Vengeance of Thor, was released by Pegana Press, Olympia, Washington, in 2017.

=== Video game ===
- Dunsany appears as a playable character in the 1999 PlayStation game Koudelka.

== Memberships, awards and honours ==
Lord Dunsany was a Fellow of the Royal Society of Literature, a member and at one point President of the Authors' Society, and likewise President of the Shakespeare Reading Society from 1938 until his death in 1957, when he was succeeded by Sir John Gielgud.

Dunsany was also a fellow of the Royal Geographical Society and was an honorary member of the Institut Historique et Heraldique de France. He was initially an Associate Member of the Irish Academy of Letters, founded by Yeats and others, and later a full member. At one of their meetings, after 1922, he asked Seán Ó Faoláin, who was presiding, "Do we not toast the King?" Ó Faoláin replied that there was only one toast: to the Nation; but after it was given and O'Faolain had called for coffee, he saw Dunsany, standing quietly among the bustle, raise his glass discreetly, and whisper "God bless him".

The Curse of the Wise Woman received the Harmsworth Literary Award in Ireland.

Dunsany received an honorary doctorate, D.Litt., from Trinity College Dublin, in 1940.

In 1950, he was nominated for the Nobel Prize in Literature by Irish PEN, citing his fiction, poetry, and support for younger writers. However, after a negative appraisal by Per Hallström, the Nobel Committee did not consider him for the prize, which was won that year by Bertrand Russell.

== Influences ==
- Dunsany studied Greek and Latin, particularly Greek drama and Herodotus, the "Father of History". Dunsany wrote in a letter: "When I learned Greek at Cheam and heard of other gods a great pity came on me for those beautiful marble people that had become forsaken and this mood has never quite left me."1
- The King James Bible: In a letter to Frank Harris, Dunsany wrote: "When I went to Cheam School I was given a lot of the Bible to read. This turned my thoughts eastward. For years no style seemed to me natural but that of the Bible and I feared that I never would become a writer when I saw that other people did not use it."
- The Library of Dunsany Castle had a wide-ranging collection dating back centuries and comprising many classic works, from early encyclopaedias through parliamentary records, Greek and Latin works to Victorian illustrated books.
- His father's tale about ancient Egypt also influenced him.
- He was affected by the fairy tales of the Brothers Grimm and Hans Christian Andersen, and by the work of Edgar Allan Poe.
- Rudyard Kipling and his works set in India were also read by him.
- Irish speech patterns were an influence.
- The Darling of the Gods, a stage play written by David Belasco and John Luther Long, was first performed in 1902–1903. It presents a fantastical, imaginary version of Japan that powerfully affected Dunsany and may be a template for his own imaginary kingdoms.
- Algernon Charles Swinburne, who wrote the line "Time and the Gods are at strife" in his 1866 poem "Hymn to Proserpine": Dunsany wrote in his memoir Patches of Sunlight that this was his unconscious influence for the title Time and the Gods.
- The heroic romances of William Morris, set in imaginary lands of the author's creation affected him, such as The Well at the World's End. Dunsany's 1928 play Atlanta in Wimbledon features a young woman strongly interested in William Morris' romances, indicating that Dunsany was familiar with them.
- Dunsany's 1922 novel Don Rodriguez: Chronicles of Shadow Valley seems to draw openly on Cervantes's Don Quixote de la Mancha (1605 and 1615).
- Dunsany named his play The Seventh Symphony, collected in Plays for Earth and Air [1937], after Beethoven's 7th Symphony, which was one of Dunsany's favourite works of music. One of the last Jorkens stories returns to this theme, referring to Beethoven's Tenth Symphony.

== Writers associated with Dunsany ==
- Francis Ledwidge wrote to Dunsany in 1912 asking for help in getting his poetry published. After a delay due to a hunting trip in Africa, Dunsany invited him to his home and they met and corresponded regularly thereafter. Dunsany was so impressed that he helped with publication and with introductions to literary society. Dunsany, trying to discourage Ledwidge from joining the army when the First World War broke out, offered him financial support. Ledwidge, however, joined up and found himself for a time in the same unit as Dunsany, who helped with the publication of his first collection, Songs of the Fields – a critical success on its release in 1915. Ledwidge kept in contact with Dunsany through the war, sending him poems. He was killed at the Battle of Passchendaele in 1917, even as his second collection of poetry, also selected by Dunsany, circulated. Dunsany later arranged for a third collection to appear, and later still a first Collected Edition. Some unpublished Ledwidge poetry and drama, given or sent to Dunsany, are still held at the Castle.
- Mary Lavin who received support and encouragement from Dunsany over many years.
- William Butler Yeats, although he rarely acted as such, selected and edited a collection of Dunsany's work in 1912.
- Lady Wentworth, a poet writing in a classical style, received support from Dunsany.

== Writers influenced by Dunsany ==
- Terry Pratchett quotes Dunsany's line from The King of Elfland's Daughter, "beyond the fields we know", in his book Lords and Ladies.
- Talbot Mundy much admired Dunsany's "plays and fantasy", according to his biographer, Brian Taves.
- Kenneth Morris was familiar with Lord Dunsany's work. A blurb on the dust-jacket of Morris' 1926 book The Secret Mountain and Other Tales stated that "The author's nearest literary relative is perhaps Lord Dunsany."
- Donald Corley wrote two books of short fantastic narratives, The House of Lost Identity (1927), and The Haunted Jester (1931), fashioned after Dunsany's stories.
- H. P. Lovecraft was much impressed by Dunsany after seeing him on a speaking tour of the United States. His "Dream Cycle" stories, his dark pseudo-history of how the universe came to be, and his god Azathoth all clearly show Dunsany's influence. He once wrote: "There are my 'Poe' pieces and my 'Dunsany' pieces – but alas – where are my Lovecraft pieces?" In 1948, Arthur C. Clarke sent Lord Dunsany a copy of The Arkham Sampler magazine, containing part of Lovecraft's story The Dream-Quest of Unknown Kadath. Dunsany wrote back to Clarke: "I see Lovecraft borrowed my style, and I don't grudge it to him. Indeed, I am glad to be able to read his tales."
- J. R. R. Tolkien, according to John D. Rateliff's report, presented Clyde S. Kilby with a copy of The Book of Wonder as a preparation for his auxiliary role in compiling and developing The Silmarillion in the 1960s. Tolkien's letters and divulged notes made allusions to two stories found in the volume, "Chu-Bu and Sheemish" and "The Distressing Tale of Thangobrind the Jeweller." Dale J. Nelson has argued in Tolkien Studies 01 that Tolkien may have been inspired by another of The Book of Wonder tales, "The Hoard of the Gibbelins," while writing a poem, "The Mewlips", included in The Adventures of Tom Bombadil.
- Clark Ashton Smith was a fan of Dunsany's work, which had some influence on his fantasy stories. Fantasy historian Jim Rockhill has noted that Smith's play The Dead Will Cuckold You (written 1951/52, published in 1963) is structurally inspired by "Dunsany's early fantasy plays."
- Fletcher Pratt's 1948 novel The Well of the Unicorn was written as a sequel to Dunsany's play King Argimenes and the Unknown Warrior. Pratt later co-wrote the Dunsany-influenced series, Tales from Gavagan's Bar, with his friend L. Sprague De Camp.
- Vernon Knowles wrote two collections of short stories, The Street of Queer Houses and Other Stories (1924), and Here and Otherwhere (coll 1926), patterned after Dunsany's volumes of short fiction.
- Jorge Luis Borges included Dunsany's short story "The Idle City" in Antología de la Literatura Fantástica (1940, revised 1976). He also, in his essay "Kafka and His Precursors," included Dunsany's story "Carcassonne" as one text that presaged or paralleled Franz Kafka's themes.
- Manly Wade Wellman esteemed Dunsany's fiction.
- Robert E. Howard placed Dunsany in a list of his favourite poets in a 1932 letter to Lovecraft.
- Evangeline Walton stated in an interview that Dunsany inspired her to write fantasy.
- L. Sprague de Camp was an admirer of Lord Dunsany's fiction. His short story series Tales from Gavagan's Bar (co-written with Fletcher Pratt) was inspired by Dunsany's Jorkens stories.
- Donald Wandrei, in a 7 February 1927 letter to H. P. Lovecraft, listed Dunsany's The King of Elfland's Daughter among his collection of "weird books" that Wandrei had read.
- C. L. Moore told H. P. Lovecraft in a letter (dated July 19, 1935) that her writing had been inspired by Lord Dunsany's work, especially his novel The King of Elfland's Daughter.
- Margaret St. Clair was an admirer of Dunsany's work. Her story "The Man Who Sold Rope to the Gnoles" (1951) is a sequel to Dunsany's "How Nuth Would Have Practised His Art Upon the Gnoles".
- Álvaro Cunqueiro acknowledged the influence of Lord Dunsany on his work and wrote him an epitaph included in "Herba de aquí e de acolá".
- Jack Vance was a keen reader of Dunsany's work as a child.
- Arthur C. Clarke enjoyed Dunsany's work and corresponded with him between 1944 and 1956. The letters are collected in Arthur C. Clarke & Lord Dunsany: A Correspondence. Clarke also edited and allowed the use of an early essay as an introduction to a volume of The Collected Jorkens. The essay acknowledges the link between Jorkens and Tales from the White Hart.
- Cyril M. Kornbluth, an avid Dunsany reader as a young man, mentions him in a short fantasy story, "Mr. Packer Goes to Hell" (1941).
- Sterling E. Lanier was an enthusiast of Dunsany's work. Lanier patterned his "Brigadier Ffellowes" stories after Dunsany's Joseph Jorkens tales.
- Ursula K. Le Guin, in an essay on style in fantasy, "From Elfland to Poughkeepsie", called Dunsany the "First Terrible Fate that Awaiteth Unwary Beginners in Fantasy", alluding to a common practice among young writers at the time to attempt to write in Lord Dunsany's style. In a 1973 essay, "A Citizen of Mondath", Le Guin described reading Dunsany's book A Dreamer's Tales as a child. Le Guin described the book "as a revelation" and added "Dunsany's influence was wholly benign", calling him a "liberator" for her imagination.
- Gene Wolfe used a Dunsany poem to open his 2004 work The Knight.
- David Eddings once named Lord Dunsany as his personal favourite fantasy writer and recommended him to aspiring authors.
- M. J. Engh has acknowledged Dunsany as an influence.
- Peter S. Beagle cites Dunsany as an influence and wrote an introduction to one of the recent reprint editions.
- Michael Moorcock was influenced by Dunsany.
- Charles de Lint has named Lord Dunsany's work as a stimulus to his own fantasy novels.
- Gary Myers's 1975 short story collection The House of the Worm is a double pastiche of Dunsany and Lovecraft.
- Clive Barker read Dunsany's fantasy works as a teenager. In a later interview, Barker stated "I learned many years ago, from Blake and from Lord Dunsany, that there is something marvelous in inventing words."
- Neil Gaiman expressed admiration for Dunsany and wrote an introduction to a collection of his stories. Some commentators have seen links between The King of Elfland's Daughter and Gaiman's Stardust (book and film). This is seemingly supported by a comment of Gaiman's quoted in The Neil Gaiman Reader.
- Guillermo del Toro, Mexican film-maker, cited Dunsany as an influence; He dedicated his book The Hollow Ones to him among other "old-school horror/fantasy writers".
- Welleran Poltarnees, author of numerous non-fantasy "blessing books" employing turn-of-the-century artwork, uses a pen name based on two of Lord Dunsany's famous stories.

== Curator and studies ==
In the late 1990s, a curator, J. W. (Joe) Doyle, was appointed by the estate to work at Dunsany Castle, in part to locate and organise the author's manuscripts, typescripts and other materials. Doyle found several works known to exist but thought to be "lost": the plays The Ginger Cat and "The Murderers," some Jorkens stories, and the novel The Pleasures of a Futuroscope (later published by Hippocampus Press). He also found hitherto unknown works, including The Last Book of Jorkens, to the first edition of which he wrote an introduction, and an unnamed 1956 short story collection, eventually published as part of The Ghost in the Corner and other stories in 2017. Doyle was still working as curator in 2020. Some uncollected works, previously published in magazines, and some unpublished works, have been selected in consultation with them, and published in chapbooks by a US small press.

Fans and scholars S. T. Joshi and Darrell Schweitzer worked on the Dunsany œuvre for over twenty years, gathering stories, essays and reference material, for a joint initial bibliography and separate scholarly studies of Dunsany's work. An updated edition of their bibliography appeared in 2013. Joshi edited The Collected Jorkens and The Ginger Cat and other lost plays and co-edited The Ghost in the Corner and other stories using materials unearthed by the Dunsany curator.

In the late 2000s a PhD researcher, Tania Scott from the University of Glasgow, worked on Dunsany for some time and spoke at literary and other conventions; her thesis was published in 2011, entitled Locating Ireland in the fantastic fiction of Lord Dunsany. A Swedish fan, Martin Andersson, was also active in research and publication in the mid-2010s.

=== Documentary ===
An hour-long documentary, Shooting for the Butler, was released by Auteur TV and Justified Films in 2014, directed by Digby Rumsey. With footage from Dunsany and Shoreham, it included interviews with the author's great-grandson, the estate's curator, author Liz Williams, scholar S. T. Joshi, a local who knew the writer personally, and the head of the Irish Chess Union, among others.

== Legacy ==
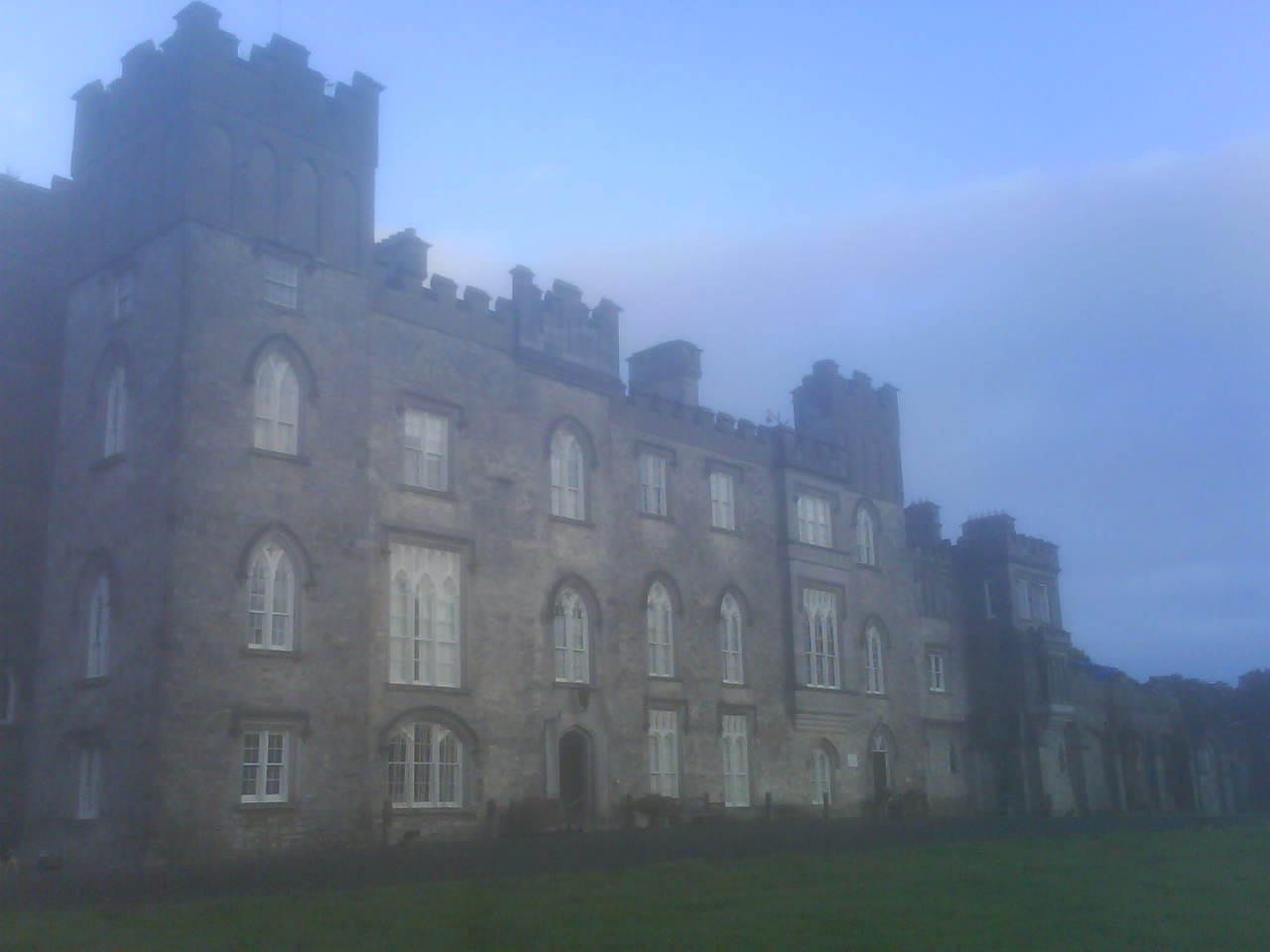
Dunsany Castle (1181–), County Meath, Ireland

Dunsany's literary rights passed to a will trust first managed by Beatrice, Lady Dunsany, and are currently handled by Curtis Brown of London and partner firms worldwide. (Some past US deals, for example, have been listed by Locus Magazine as by SCG [Scovil Chichak Galen]) A few Dunsany works are protected for longer than normal copyright periods in some territories, notably most of the contents of the Last Book of Jorkens, and some short stories published on the Dunsany website or elsewhere by the family in the early 2000s.

Dunsany's primary home, Dunsany Castle, over 840 years old, can be visited at certain times. Tours usually include the Library, but not the tower room where he often liked to work. His London homes were not retained and his principal residence in his final years, Dunstall Priory in Shoreham, Kent, was sold to an admirer, Grey Gowrie, later head of the Arts Council of the UK, and then passed to other owners; the family still owns a farm and downland in the area and a Tudor cottage in Shoreham village. The grave of Dunsany and his wife can be seen in Shoreham's church graveyard (most previous barons of Dunsany are buried in the grounds of Dunsany Castle).

Dunsany's manuscripts are collected in the family archive, including some specially bound volumes of some of his works. Scholarly access is possible through the curator. Seven boxes of Dunsany's papers are held at the Harry Ransom Center, and a set at a university in Los Angeles.

== See also ==
- List of fantasy authors
- List of horror fiction authors

== Notes ==
Peerage of Ireland
Preceded by John Plunkett	Baron Dunsany; 1899–1957	Succeeded by Randal Plunkett
