= List of works by Lord Dunsany =

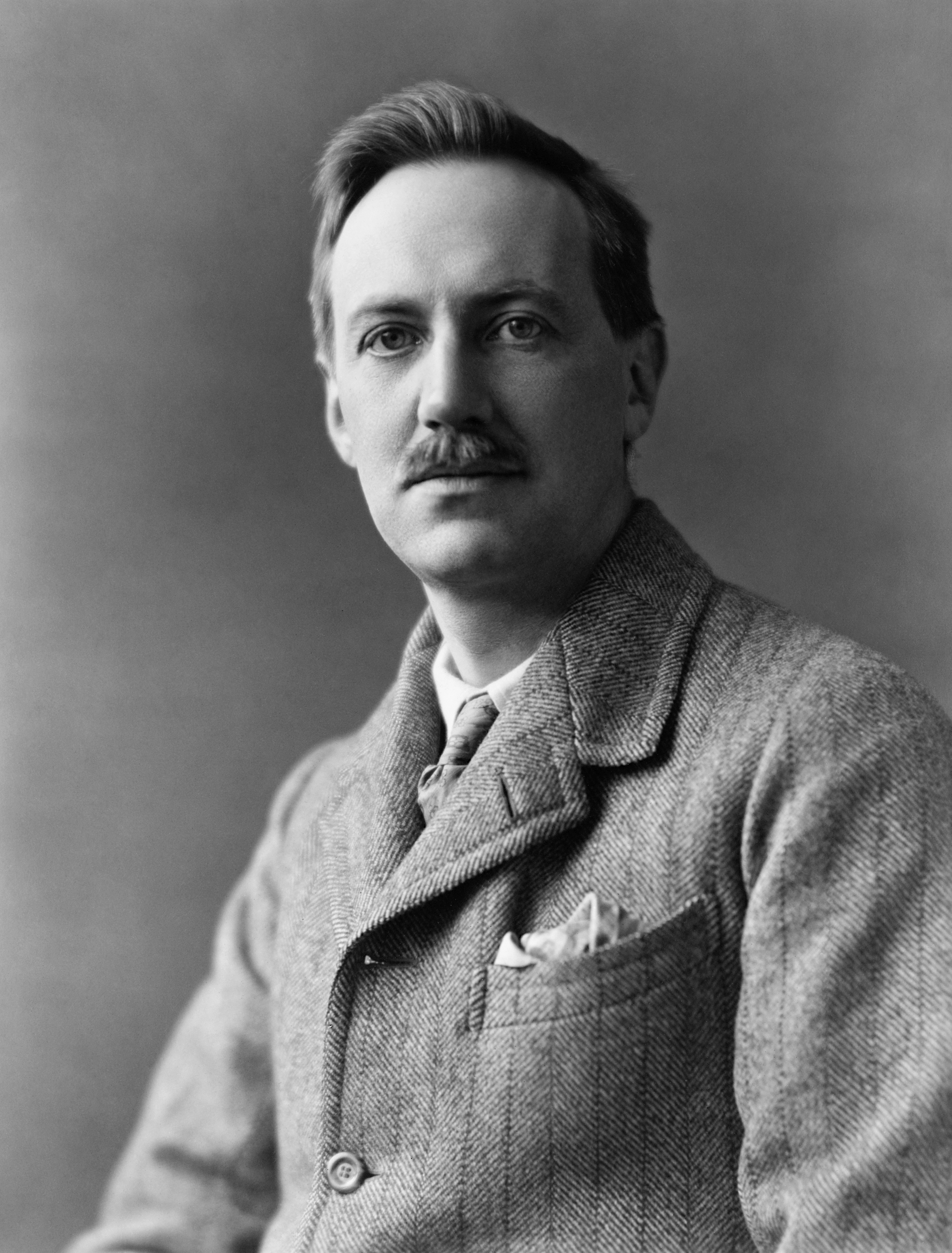
Dunsany in 1919

The catalogue of Edward Plunkett, 18th Baron of Dunsany (Lord Dunsany)'s work during his 53-year active writing career is quite extensive, and is fraught with pitfalls for two reasons: first, many of Dunsany's original books of collected short stories were later followed by reprint collections, some of which were unauthorised and included only previously published stories; and second, some later collections bore titles very similar to different original books.

In 1993, S. T. Joshi and Darrell Schweitzer released a bibliographic volume which, while emphasising that it makes no claim to be the final word, gives considerable information on Dunsany's work. They noted that a "ledger" of at least some of Dunsany's work was thought to have existed at Dunsany Castle. The Dunsany family has had a curator, Joe Doyle, since the 1990s, who gathered materials by Dunsany and Francis Ledwidge at Dunsany Castle, compiled writing and publication data, and unearthed works such as the Last Book of Jorkens and some "loose" Jorkens stories, plays including The Ginger Cat, and a set of short stories, some published in a 2017 collection, as well as supplying material for the Lost Tales series.

The following is a partial list compiled from various sources.

== Short-story collections ==
=== Original ===
==== Miscellaneous ====
- The Gods of Pegāna (1905)
- Time and the Gods (1906)
- The Sword of Welleran and Other Stories (1908)
- A Dreamer's Tales (1910)
- The Book of Wonder (1912)
- Fifty-One Tales, aka The Food of Death (1915)
- Tales of Wonder (1916) (published in the United States as The Last Book of Wonder)
- Tales of War (1918)
- Unhappy Far-Off Things (1919)
- Tales of Three Hemispheres (U.S. 1919, UK 1920)
- The Man Who Ate the Phoenix (1949)
- The Little Tales of Smethers and Other Stories (1952), including the Linley crime/mystery tales

==== Jorkens ====
- The Travel Tales of Mr. Joseph Jorkens (1931)
- Jorkens Remembers Africa (1934)
- Jorkens Has a Large Whiskey (1940)
- The Fourth Book of Jorkens (1947)
- Jorkens Borrows Another Whiskey (1954)
- The Last Book of Jorkens (2002), prepared for publication in 1957

The Jorkens books were released in a 3-volume omnibus set in 2004–2005, with some added material:

- The Collected Jorkens, Volume One (April 2004), the first two books of Jorkens
- The Collected Jorkens, Volume Two (2004), the second two Jorkens books, plus two uncollected stories, one not previously published
- The Collected Jorkens, Volume Three (April 2005), the last two Jorkens books, plus three uncollected stories, at least one not previously published

=== Reprint collections ===
- Selections from the Writings of Lord Dunsany (1912, edited by W. B. Yeats)
- A Dreamer's Tales and Other Stories (1917; collects A Dreamer's Tales and The Sword of Welleran, unauthorised)
- Book of Wonder (1918; collects The Book of Wonder and Time and the Gods, unauthorised)
- The Sword of Welleran and Other Tales of Enchantment (1954), selected by Lord and Lady Dunsany as a sampling of works to date

=== Posthumous collections ===
- At the Edge of the World (1970), Short stories, ed. Lin Carter
- Beyond the Fields We Know (1972), Short stories, ed. Lin Carter
- Gods, Men and Ghosts (1972), including short stories, essays
- Over the Hills and Far Away (1974), ed. Lin Carter
- The Ghosts of the Heaviside Layer, and Other Fantasms (1980), a posthumous gathering of uncollected stories, essays and two plays, ed. Darrell Schweitzer
- Bethmoora and Other Stories (1993)
- The Exiles Club and Other Stories (1993)
- The Lands of Wonder (1994)
- The Hashish Man and Other Stories (1996)
- The Complete Pegana (1998), containing The Gods of Pegana, Time and the Gods and a little of The Sword of Welleran, ed. S.T. Joshi
- Time and the Gods (2000), omnibus of short stories
- In the Land of Time, and Other Fantasy Tales (March 2004), a Penguin Classics volume
- Lost Tales, Volume 1 (2012) Previously uncollected short stories appearing in magazines between 1909 and 1915.
- Lost Tales, Volume 2: The Emperor's Crystal & Other Lost Tales (2013) Previously uncollected short stories appearing in magazines and newspapers between 1915-1920, and one previously unpublished story from 1909.
- Lost Tales, Volume 3 (2014) Previously uncollected short stories appearing in magazines and newspapers between 1910-1954, along with three previously unpublished stories.
- The Men of Baldfolk & Other Fanciful Tales (2016) Five previously unpublished stories and four uncollected stories, ranging from 1908 to 1955.
- The Ghost in the Corner and Other Stories (2017) 50 uncollected and previously unpublished stories.
- A Dreamer's Tales: Annotated Edition (2018) Annotated collection of stories.
- Lost Tales, Volume 4 (2018) Eight previously unpublished stories and one uncollected story, dating from 1909 to 1956.
- Lost Tales, Volume 5 (2020) Six previously unpublished stories, two uncollected stories, one story also published in 2017's The Ghost in the Corner, and one poem, ranging in date from 1914 to 1953.

== Novels ==
=== Fantasy ===
==== The Chronicles of Shadow Valley ====
1. Don Rodriguez: Chronicles of Shadow Valley aka The Chronicles of Rodriguez (1922)
2. The Charwoman's Shadow (1926)

==== Standalone Fantasy Novels ====
- The King of Elfland's Daughter (1924)
- The Blessing of Pan (1927, see also Pan)
- The Curse of the Wise Woman (1933)
- My Talks With Dean Spanley (1936)
- The Strange Journeys of Colonel Polders (1950)

=== Science fiction ===
- The Last Revolution (1951)
- The Pleasures of a Futuroscope (2003) (posthumous novel dating from the mid-1950s; on a topic first introduced in a Jorkens story)

=== Non-science fiction or fantasy ===
- Up in the Hills (1935)
- Rory and Bran (1936)
- The Story of Mona Sheehy (1939)
- Guerrilla (1944)
- His Fellow Men (1952)

== Plays ==
Most of Dunsany's early plays were issued in individual editions by Samuel French and were freely available, though mostly for the acting and production markets. Some were also released by Putnam's, and a few in special editions.

=== Collections ===
- Five Plays (1914)
  - "The Gods of the Mountain"
  - "The Golden Doom"
  - "King Argimenes and the Unknown Warrior"
  - "The Glittering Gate"
  - "The Lost Silk Hat"
- A Night at an Inn (one-act play) (1916)
- Plays of Gods and Men (1917)
  - "The Laughter of the Gods"
  - "The Queen's Enemies"
  - "The Tents of the Arabs"
  - "A Night at an Inn" (as above)
- If (full-length play) (1921)
- Plays of Near and Far (1922)
  - "The Compromise of the King of the Golden Isles"
  - "The Flight of the Queen"
  - "Cheezo"
  - "A Good Bargain"
  - "If Shakespeare Lived Today"
  - "Fame and the Poet"
- Alexander and Three Small Plays (1925)
  - "Alexander"
  - "The Old King's Tale"
  - "The Evil Kettle"
  - "The Amusements of Khan Kharuda"
- Seven Modern Comedies (1928)
  - "Atalanta in Wimbledon"
  - "The Raffle"
  - "The Journey of the Soul"
  - "In Holy Russia"
  - "His Sainted Grandmother"
  - "The Hopeless Passion of Mr Bunyon"
  - "The Jest of Hahalaba"
- The Old Folk of the Centuries (full-length play) (1930)
- Mr Faithful (full-length play) (1935)
- Plays for Earth and Air (1937), plays written for and produced on radio, notably BBC Light and the World Service; not published separately
  - "Fame Comes Late"
  - "A Matter of Honour"
  - "Mr Sliggen's Hour"
  - "The Pumpkin"
  - "The Use of Man"
  - "The Bureau de Change"
  - "The Seventh Symphony"
  - "Golden Dragon City"
  - "Time's Joke"
  - "Atmospherics"
- The Ghosts of the Heaviside Layer, and Other Fantasms (1980), a posthumous gathering of uncollected stories, essays and two plays
  - "The Prince of Stamboul" (1925), not published separately
  - "Lord Adrian" (1933), published in a limited edition
- The Ginger Cat and Other Lost Plays (2005), plays known to have existed, and in at least one case acted, but only unearthed in the 2000s
  - "The Ginger Cat" (1914), not published at the time
  - "The Murderers" (1919), performed once but not published
  - "Mr Faithful" (1922), published in a standalone book

== Poetry collections ==
- Fifty Poems (1929)
- Mirage Water (1938)
- War Poems (1941) (extensive notes to each poem posted in review of the book at Amazon.co.uk)
- Wandering Songs (1943)
- A Journey (1944)
- The Year (1946)
- The Odes of Horace (1947) (translation)
- To Awaken Pegasus (1949)
- Verses Dedicatory: 18 Previously Unpublished Poems (1985)

== Nonfiction ==
=== Essay collections ===
- Gods, Men and Ghosts (1972), including short stories, essays
- The Ghosts of the Heaviside Layer, and Other Fantasms (1980), a posthumous gathering of uncollected stories, essays and two plays

=== Essays ===
- Nowadays (1918), a single long essay
- If I Were Dictator (1934), a long satirical essay, one of a series by well-known figures of the period
- The Donnellan Lectures 1943 (1945), lectures given at Trinity College Dublin by Dunsany
- A Glimpse from a Watchtower (1947), a long essay musing on the future in a nuclear era

=== Geography/history ===
- My Ireland (1937), a non-fiction look at Ireland and her landscape and heritage, with photos

=== Autobiography ===
- Patches of Sunlight (1938)
- While The Sirens Slept (1944)
- The Sirens Wake (1945)

=== Letters ===
- Arthur C. Clarke & Lord Dunsany: A Correspondence 1945–1956. ed. Keith Allen Daniels. Palo Alto, CA, USA: Anamnesis Press, 1998, a posthumous collection with the cooperation of the Dunsany Estate and Arthur C. Clarke.

== Books in print ==
=== Millennium Fantasy Masterworks ===
- Time and the Gods (contains The Gods of Pegāna, Time and the Gods, The Sword of Welleran and Other Stories, A Dreamer's Tales, The Book of Wonder and The Last Book of Wonder, without the Sime illustrations and with Pegāna out of order)
- The King of Elfland's Daughter

=== Penguin Classics ===
- In the Land of Time: and Other Fantasy Tales

=== Del Rey Books ===
- The King of Elfland's Daughter
- The Charwoman's Shadow

=== Hippocampus Press ===
- The Pleasures of a Futuroscope
- The Ghost in the Corner and Other Stories

=== Wildside Press ===
- The Gods of Pegāna
- Time and the Gods
- The Book of Wonder
- A Dreamer's Tales
- Fifty-One Tales
- Tales of War: Expanded Edition
- Unhappy Far-Off Things
- Don Rodriguez: Chronicles of Shadow Valley
- Plays of Gods and Men
- The Ginger Cat and Other Lost Plays

=== Forgotten classics ===
- The Dreams of a Prophet (hardcover, with large print edition also available via the Lulu.com website; contains the collections The Gods of Pegana, Time and the Gods, The Sword of Welleran, and Fifty-One Tales)

=== Pegana Press ===
A series of manually printed small books featuring obscure and unpublished Dunsany material, with illustration by various hands, including Sime and the writer himself. The series went on an announced hiatus in 2020, after "Volume 5", but resumption of publication was announced in 2025.

- Lost Tales, Volume 1
- Lost Tales, Volume 2 (The Emperor's Crystal & Other Lost Tales)
- Lost Tales, Volume 3
- The Men of Baldfolk & Other Fanciful Tales
- Lost Tales, Volume 4
- Lost Tales, Volume 5

=== Valancourt Books ===
- The Curse of the Wise Woman with an introduction by Mark Valentine.
