= List of Night Gallery episodes =

The horror anthology series Night Gallery began on December 16, 1970 (after the television pilot for the series was aired on November 8, 1969) and ended on May 27, 1973, with three seasons and 43 episodes. It was created by Rod Serling and broadcast on NBC. This list does not include the 25 episodes of The Sixth Sense which were edited into Night Gallery for syndication.

== Series overview ==
Season	Episodes	Segments	Originally released	
Season	Episodes	Segments	First released	Last released
Pilot	1	3	November 8, 1969	
1	6	14	December 16, 1970	January 20, 1971
2	22	62	September 15, 1971	March 1, 1972
3	15	17	September 24, 1972	May 27, 1973
Syndication	2	2	October 10, 1973	March 17, 1974

== Episodes ==
Most episodes include multiple story segments.

=== Pilot: 1969 ===
Night Gallery Pilot
No. overall	No. in season	Title	Directed by	Written by	Cast	Original release date
1	0a	"The Cemetery"	Boris Sagal	Rod Serling	Ossie Davis, Roddy McDowall, George Macready, Barry Atwater, Tom Basham, Richard Hale	November 8, 1969
After murdering his uncle, a man (Roddy McDowall) is haunted by a family painting that keeps changing.
2	0b	"Eyes"	Steven Spielberg	Rod Serling	Joan Crawford, Barry Sullivan, Tom Bosley, Byron Morrow, Garry Goodrow, Shannon Farnon	November 8, 1969
A blind woman (Joan Crawford) undergoes an operation that gives her 12 hours to see.
3	0c	"Escape Route"	Barry Shear	Rod Serling	Richard Kiley, Sam Jaffe, Norma Crane, George Murdock	November 8, 1969
A fugitive Nazi (Richard Kiley) faces the consequences of his past actions.

=== Season 1: 1970–71 ===
Season 1 episodes are approximately 60 minutes in length.

Night Gallery Pilot
No. overall	No. in season	Title	Directed by	Written by	Cast	Original release date
4	1a	"The Dead Man"	Douglas Heyes	Douglas Heyes	Carl Betz, Jeff Corey, Louise Sorel, Michael Blodgett, Glenn Dixon	December 16, 1970
A physician's experiment in hypnosis comes to a terrifying conclusion. Note: Based on a short story of the same name by Fritz Leiber
5	1b	"The Housekeeper"	John Meredyth Lucas	Douglas Heyes (credited as Matthew Howard)	Larry Hagman, Suzy Parker, Jeanette Nolan, Cathleen Cordell, Howard Morton	December 16, 1970
A dabbler in black magic (Larry Hagman) attempts to improve his marriage by transferring the soul of his housekeeper into his cold-hearted wife's body.
6	2a	"Room with a View"	Jerrold Freedman	Hal Dresner	Joseph Wiseman, Diane Keaton, Angel Tompkins, Morgan Farley, Larry Watson	December 23, 1970
A wealthy invalid (Joseph Wiseman) uses his unwitting nurse (Diane Keaton) to help with his revenge against his unfaithful gold digger wife. Note: Based on a short story of the same name by Hal Dresner
7	2b	"The Little Black Bag"	Jeannot Szwarc	Rod Serling	Burgess Meredith, Chill Wills, George Furth, E. J. André, Arthur Malet, Eunice Suarez, Marion Val, Johnny Silver, C. Lindsay Workman, Matt Pelto, Robert Terry, Ralph Moody, William Challee	December 23, 1970
In 1971, a disgraced doctor (Burgess Meredith) finds a medical bag from 2098. Note: Based on a short story of the same name by Cyril M. Kornbluth
8	2c	"The Nature of the Enemy"	Allen Reisner	Rod Serling	Joseph Campanella, Richard Van Vleet, James Sikking, Jason Wingreen, Albert Popwell, Jerry Strickler	December 23, 1970
A scientist (Joseph Campanella) at NASA Mission Control watches disaster unfold on the Moon.
9	3a	"The House"	John Astin	Rod Serling	Joanna Pettet, Paul Richards, Steve Franken, Jan Burrell, Almira Sessions	December 30, 1970
A young woman (Joanna Pettet) enters a house she's seen in her dreams. Note: Based on a short story by André Maurois
10	3b	"Certain Shadows on the Wall"	Jeff Corey	Rod Serling	Louis Hayward, Agnes Moorehead, Grayson Hall, Rachel Roberts	December 30, 1970
The shadow of a recently deceased woman (Agnes Moorehead) remains cast on the parlor wall to haunt her sinister brother. Note: Based on the short story "The Shadows on the Wall" by Mary E. Wilkins-Freeman
11	4a	"Make Me Laugh"	Steven Spielberg	Rod Serling	Godfrey Cambridge, Tom Bosley, Jackie Vernon, Al Lewis, Sidney Clute, John J. Fox, Gene R. Kearney, Tony Russel, Sonny Klein, Michele Hart, Georgia Schmidt, Sid Rushakoff, Don Melvoin	January 6, 1971
A comic (Godfrey Cambridge) desperate for laughs makes a deal with an equally desperate miracle worker.
12	4b	"Clean Kills and Other Trophies"	Walter Doniger	Rod Serling	Raymond Massey, Tom Troupe, Barry Brown, Herbert Jefferson Jr.,	January 6, 1971
A big-game hunter (Raymond Massey) faces the wrath of vengeful gods when he forces his son to shoot a deer.
13	5a	"Pamela's Voice"	Richard Benedict	Rod Serling	Phyllis Diller, John Astin	January 13, 1971
A husband (John Astin) murders his wife (Phyllis Diller), only to have her haunt him.
14	5b	"Lone Survivor"	Gene Levitt	Rod Serling	John Colicos, Torin Thatcher, Hedley Mattingly, Charles Davis, Brendan Dillon, William Beckley, Terence Pushman, Edward Colmans, Pierre Jalbert, Carl Milletaire	January 13, 1971
In 1915, a man (John Colicos) adrift in a lifeboat labeled Titanic is picked up by the RMS Lusitania. 40 years later, a lifeboat labeled Lusitania is picked up by the SS Andrea Doria.
15	5c	"The Doll"	Rudi Dorn	Rod Serling	Shani Wallis, John Williams, Henry Silva, Than Wyenn, Jewel Blanch, John Barclay	January 13, 1971
A hideous doll is used for revenge against an officer (John Williams) in the colonial forces of Queen Victoria. Note: Based on a novelette of the same name by Algernon Blackwood
16	6a	"They're Tearing Down Tim Riley's Bar"	Don Taylor	Rod Serling	William Windom, Diane Baker, Bert Convy, John Randolph, Henry Beckman, David Astor, Robert Herrman, Gene O'Donnell, Frederic Downs, John Ragin, David Frank, Susannah Darrow, Mary Gail Hobbs, Margie Hall, Don Melvoin, Matt Pelto	January 20, 1971
A has-been salesman (William Windom) tries desperately to return to the past. Note: Episode nominated for an Emmy Award for "Outstanding Single Program" (1971).
17	6b	"The Last Laurel"	Daryl Duke	Rod Serling	Jack Cassidy, Martine Beswick, Martin E. Brooks	January 20, 1971
A crippled athlete (Jack Cassidy) plots to use mind over matter to commit murder. Note: Based on The Horsehair Trunk by Davis Grubb.

=== Season 2: 1971–72 ===
Season 2 episodes are approximately 60 minutes in length.

Night Gallery Pilot
No. overall	No. in season	Title	Directed by	Written by	Cast	Original release date
18	1a	"The Boy Who Predicted Earthquakes"	John Badham	Rod Serling	Michael Constantine, Clint Howard, Bernie Kopell, Ellen Weston, William Hansen, Gene Tyburn, Rance Howard, Rosary Nix, John Donald	September 15, 1971
A phenomenally successful young seer (Clint Howard) refuses to continue making predictions. Note: Based on a short story of the same name by Margaret St. Clair
19	1b	"Miss Lovecraft Sent Me"	Gene Kearney	Jack Laird	Joseph Campanella, Sue Lyon	September 15, 1971
A vampire (Joseph Campanella), not dissimilar to Count Dracula, hires a babysitter (Sue Lyon).
20	1c	"The Hand of Borgus Weems"	John M. Lucas	Alvin Sapinsley	George Maharis, Ray Milland, Joan Huntington, Patricia Donahue, Peter Mamakos, Robert Hoy, William Mims	September 15, 1971
A man (George Maharis) discovers that one of his hands has a murderous mind of its own. Note: Based on the short story "The Other Hand" by George Langelaan
21	1d	"Phantom of What Opera?"	Gene Kearney	Gene Kearney	Leslie Nielsen, Mary Ann Beck	September 15, 1971
The Phantom of the Opera (Leslie Nielsen) is surprised by the woman he has taken prisoner (Mary Ann Beck).
22	2a	"Death in the Family"	Jeannot Szwarc	Rod Serling	E.G. Marshall, Desi Arnaz Jr., Noam Pitlik, James B. Sikking, John William Evans, Bill Elliott, Bud Walls	September 22, 1971
A wounded killer takes refuge in a funeral home where the undertaker has an unusual compassion for his charges. Note: Based on a short story by Miriam Allen deFord
23	2b	"The Merciful"	Jeannot Szwarc	Jack Laird	Imogene Coca, King Donovan	September 22, 1971
A woman's (Imogene Coca) effort to end her husband's (King Donovan) misery is not what it seems at first. Note: Based on a short story "Soft, Sweet Sleep" by Charles L. Sweeney, Jr.; twist on "The Cask of Amontillado"
24	2c	"Class of '99"	Jeannot Szwarc	Rod Serling	Vincent Price, Brandon de Wilde, Randolph Mantooth, Frank Hotchkiss, Hilly Hicks, Suzanne Cohane, Barbara Shannon, Richard Doyle, Hunter von Leer, John Davey, Lenore Kasdorf	September 22, 1971
In the year 1999, a graduating class takes a rather revealing final exam from their Professor (Vincent Price).
25	2d	"Witches' Feast"	Jerrold Freedman	Gene Kearney	Agnes Moorehead, Ruth Buzzi, Allison McKay, Fran Ryan	September 22, 1971
A group of hungry witches around a cauldron wait for their companion, who brings a package which turns out to be a deli take-out order. Note: This segment was poorly received and therefore replaced by "Satisfaction Guaranteed" on the episode's repeat broadcast on March 22, 1972.
26	3a	"Since Aunt Ada Came to Stay"	William Hale	Alvin Sapinsley	James Farentino, Michele Lee, Jonathan Harris, Jeanette Nolan, Eldon Quick, Charles Seel, Alma Platt, Arnold Turner	September 29, 1971
A college professor (James Farentino) suspects his wife's (Michele Lee) aunt (Jeanette Nolan) of being a witch. Note: Based on a short story "The Witch" by A. E. van Vogt
27	3b	"With Apologies to Mr. Hyde"	Jeannot Szwarc	Jack Laird	Adam West, Jack Laird	September 29, 1971
Dr. Jekyll (Adam West) tests a new potion.
28	3c	"The Flip-Side of Satan"	Jerrold Freedman	Malcolm Marmorstein, Gerald Sanford	Arte Johnson	September 29, 1971
A murderous disc jockey (Arte Johnson) confronts his past in an old abandoned radio station and gets the "shock" of his life. Note: Based on a short story by Hal Dresner
29	4a	"A Fear of Spiders"	John Astin	Rod Serling	Patrick O'Neal, Kim Stanley, Tom Pedi	October 6, 1971
A heartless gourmet (Patrick O'Neal) is punished by his arachnophobia. Note: Based on a short story "The Spider" by Elizabeth Walter
30	4b	"Junior"	Theodore J. Flicker	Gene Kearney, Barbara Flicker, Bill Svanoe	Wally Cox	October 6, 1971
A mother and father (Wally Cox) learn the hardships of parenting.
31	4c	"Marmalade Wine"	Jerrold Freedman	Jerrold Freedman	Robert Morse, Rudy Vallée	October 6, 1971
A careless braggart (Robert Morse) has a fateful meeting with a reclusive surgeon (Rudy Vallée). Note: Based on a short story by Joan Aiken
32	4d	"The Academy"	Jeff Corey	Rod Serling	Leif Erickson, Pat Boone, Larry Linville, Ed Call, Stanley Waxman, Robert Gibbons, E.A. Sirianni, John Gruber	October 6, 1971
Mr. Holston, a widower (played by Pat Boone) investigates a military school, Glendalough Military Academy, he wishes his son to attend. It becomes clear that the cadets never leave the school, staying their whole lives, but the man still wants his son to go there. Note: Based on a short story of the same title by David Ely
33	5a	"The Phantom Farmhouse"	Jeannot Szwarc	Halsted Welles	David McCallum, Linda Marsh, David Carradine, Ivor Francis, Ford Rainey, Trina Parks, Bill Quinn, Gail Bonney, Martin Ashe, Ray Ballard, Frank Arnold	October 20, 1971
A psychiatrist (David McCallum) falls for a mysterious woman (Linda Marsh) when one of his patients (David Carradine) tempts him into visiting her. Note: Based on a short story of the same title by Seabury Quinn
34	5b	"Silent Snow, Secret Snow"	Gene Kearney	Gene Kearney	Orson Welles, Lonny Chapman, Lisabeth Hush, Radames Pera, Jason Wingreen, Frances Spanier, Patti Cohoon	October 20, 1971
A boy's (Radames Pera) fascination with snow lures him into a fantasy world. Note: Based on a short story of the same title by Conrad Aiken; narrated by Orson Welles
35	6a	"A Question of Fear"	Jack Laird	Theodore J. Flicker	Leslie Nielsen, Fritz Weaver, Jack Bannon, Ivan Bonar, Owen Cunningham	October 27, 1971
An adventurer (Leslie Nielsen) accepts a bet that he can stay overnight in a haunted house for $15,000. Note: Based on a short story of the same title by Bryan Lewis.
36	6b	"The Devil Is Not Mocked"	Gene Kearney	Gene Kearney	Helmut Dantine, Francis Lederer, Hank Brandt, Martin Kosleck, Gino Gottarelli, Mark de Vries	October 27, 1971
A Nazi general (Helmut Dantine) receives a strangely warm welcome at a Balkan castle. Notes: Based on a short story of the same title by Manly Wade Wellman. Francis Lederer reprises his role as Dracula from The Return of Dracula.
37	7a	"Midnight Never Ends"	Jeannot Szwarc	Rod Serling	Robert F. Lyons, Susan Strasberg, Joseph Perry, Robert Karnes	November 3, 1971
A woman (Susan Strasberg) experiences déjà vu when she picks up a marine hitchhiker (Robert F. Lyons). Note The conclusion of this episode is foreshadowed by the painting, which shows a confused Rod Serling.
38	7b	"Brenda"	Allen Reisner	Douglas Heyes (credited as Matthew Howard)	Glenn Corbett, Laurie Prange, Robert Hogan, Barbara Babcock, Sue Taylor, Pamelyn Ferdin	November 3, 1971
A mentally deranged girl (Laurie Prange) falls in love with a slimy creature she traps in a quarry. Note: Based on a short story of the same title by Margaret St. Clair
39	8a	"The Diary"	William Hale	Rod Serling	Patty Duke, Virginia Mayo, David Wayne, Robert Yuro, James McCallion, Lindsay Wagner, Floy Dean, Diana Chesney	November 10, 1971
A diary's entries predict the future.
40	8b	"A Matter of Semantics"	Jack Laird	Gene Kearney	Cesar Romero, E. J. Peaker, Monie Ellis	November 10, 1971
Count Dracula (Cesar Romero) comes to a blood bank. Note: Actress E.J. Peaker has said that she remembers the director of "A Matter of Semantics" to be Steven Spielberg. However, Jack Laird is the officially credited director.
41	8c	"Big Surprise"	Jeannot Szwarc	Richard Matheson	John Carradine, Vincent Van Patten, Marc Vahanian, Eric Chase	November 10, 1971
A strange old man (John Carradine) persuades a group of boys to dig for a big surprise. Note: Based on a short story of the same title by Richard Matheson
42	8d	"Professor Peabody's Last Lecture"	Jerrold Freedman	Jack Laird	Carl Reiner, Johnnie Colline III, Richard Annis, Louise Lawson, Larry Watson	November 10, 1971
A professor (Carl Reiner) gives a lecture on ancient cults that turn out to be real.
43	9a	"House – with Ghost"	Gene Kearney	Gene Kearney	Bob Crane, Jo Anne Worley, Bernard Fox, Eric Christmas, Alan Napier, Trisha Noble	November 17, 1971
A philandering husband (Bob Crane) and his unsuspecting wife (Jo Anne Worley) move into a haunted house. Note: Based on a short story by August Derleth
44	9b	"A Midnight Visit to the Neighborhood Blood Bank"	William Hale	Jack Laird	Victor Buono, Journey Laird	November 17, 1971
A thirsty vampire (Victor Buono) visits a young woman (Journey Laird), with disappointing results for him.
45	9c	"Dr. Stringfellow's Rejuvenator"	Jerrold Freedman	Rod Serling	Forrest Tucker, Murray Hamilton, Don Pedro Colley, Lou Frizzell	November 17, 1971
A medicine man (Forrest Tucker) in the Old West promises to heal a farmer's dying daughter.
46	9d	"Hell's Bells"	Theodore J. Flicker	Theodore J. Flicker	John Astin, Theodore J. Flicker, Jody Gilbert, Ceil Cabot, John J. Fox, Hank Worden	November 17, 1971
A newly-deceased man (John Astin) is in for a shock when he goes to hell. Note: Based on a short story by Harry Turner
47	10a	"The Dark Boy"	John Astin	Halsted Welles	Elizabeth Hartman, Gale Sondergaard, Michael Baseleon, Hope Summers, Ted Foulkes, Steven Lorange, Michael Laird	November 24, 1971
A teacher (Elizabeth Hartman) tries to reach a strange fourth-grader. Note: Based on a short story of the same title by August Derleth
48	10b	"Keep in Touch – We'll Think of Something"	Gene Kearney	Gene Kearney	Alex Cord, Joanna Pettet, Richard O'Brien, Dave Morick, Paul Trinka, Mike Robelo	November 24, 1971
A man (Alex Cord) searches for a very special woman (Joanna Pettet).
49	11a	"Pickman's Model"	Jack Laird	Alvin Sapinsley	Bradford Dillman, Louise Sorel, Donald Moffat, Jock Livingston, Joshua Bryant, Joan Tompkins	December 1, 1971
A woman (Louise Sorel) of Victorian Boston develops a relationship with an artist (Bradford Dillman) obsessed with ghouls. Note: Based on a short story of the same title by H. P. Lovecraft
50	11b	"The Dear Departed"	Jeff Corey	Rod Serling	Steve Lawrence, Maureen Arthur, Harvey Lembeck, Patricia Donahue, Stanley Waxman, Rose Hobart, Steve Carlson	December 1, 1971
A fake medium (Steve Lawrence) has an affair with his assistant's unfaithful wife (Maureen Arthur). Note: Based on a short story of the same name by Alice-Mary Schnirring
51	11c	"An Act of Chivalry"	Jack Laird	Jack Laird	Deidre Hudson, Ron Stein, Jimmy Cross	December 1, 1971
A living skeleton gets a lesson in elevator manners.
52	12a	"Cool Air"	Jeannot Szwarc	Rod Serling	Barbara Rush, Henry Darrow, Beatrice Kay, Larry Blake, Karl Lukas	December 8, 1971
A young woman (Barbara Rush) falls for her father's late colleague (Henry Darrow)—a man who can't stand warmth. Note: Based on a short story of the same name by H. P. Lovecraft
53	12b	"Camera Obscura"	John Badham	Rod Serling	Ross Martin, Rene Auberjonois, Arthur Malet, Milton Parsons, Brendan Dillon, Phillip Kenneally, John Barclay	December 8, 1971
A moneylender (Rene Auberjonois) gets his due thanks to a client's (Ross Martin) unusual telescope. Note: Based on a short story of the same title by Basil Copper
54	12c	"Quoth the Raven"	Jeff Corey	Jack Laird	Marty Allen	December 8, 1971
Edgar Allan Poe (Marty Allen) finds inspiration for his poem The Raven.
55	13a	"The Messiah on Mott Street"	Don Taylor	Rod Serling	Edward G. Robinson, Yaphet Kotto, Tony Roberts, Joseph Ruskin, Ricky Powell, John J. Fox, Anne Taylor	December 15, 1971
A near-penniless Jew (Edward G. Robinson), determined to stay alive for his grandson, hopes the Messiah will give him salvation.
56	13b	"The Painted Mirror"	Gene Kearney	Gene Kearney	Zsa Zsa Gabor, Arthur O'Connell, Rosemary DeCamp	December 15, 1971
An elderly antique dealer (Arthur O'Connell) uses a magic mirror portal reflecting a prehistoric world landscape to get rid of his hateful business partner (Zsa Zsa Gabor). Note: Based on a short story of the same title by Donald Wandrei
57	14a	"The Different Ones"	John Meredyth Lucas	Rod Serling	Dana Andrews, Monica Lewis, Jon Korkes, Dennis Rucker, Peggy Webber, Mary Gregory	December 29, 1971
A grotesque-looking teenager goes to another planet.
58	14b	"Tell David…"	Jeff Corey	Gerald Sanford	Sandra Dee, Jared Martin, Jenny Sullivan, Jan Shutan, Francoise Ruggieri, Anne Randall, Chris Patrick	December 29, 1971
A woman (Sandra Dee) encounters a friendly yet odd couple. Note: Based on a short story of the same title by Penelope Wallace
59	14c	"Logoda's Heads"	Jeannot Szwarc	Robert Bloch	Patrick Macnee, Brock Peters, Denise Nicholas, Tim Matheson, Albert Popwell, Zara Cully, Roger E. Mosley	December 29, 1971
A British major (Patrick Macnee) encounters an African witchdoctor (Brock Peters) suspected of murder. Note: Based on a short story of the same title by August Derleth
60	15a	"Green Fingers"	John Badham	Rod Serling	Cameron Mitchell, Elsa Lanchester, Michael Bell, Harry Hickox, Bill Quinn, Larry Watson, Jeff Burton, George Keymas	January 5, 1972
A tycoon (Cameron Mitchell) takes drastic steps to force a widow (Elsa Lanchester) off her land, only to discover her strange gardening talent. Note: Based on a short story by R. C. Cook
61	15b	"The Funeral"	John Meredyth Lucas	Richard Matheson	Joe Flynn, Werner Klemperer, Harvey Jason, Charles Macaulay, Jack Laird, Laara Lacey, Leonidas D. Ossetynski, Diana Hale, Jerry Summers	January 5, 1972
A funeral is held for a vampire. Note: Based on the short story of the same name by Richard Matheson
62	15c	"The Tune in Dan's Café"	David Rawlins	Gerald Sanford, Garrie Bateson	Pernell Roberts, Susan Oliver, James Nusser, James Davidson, Brooke Mills	January 5, 1972
A song linked to a tragic romance gives a bickering couple (Pernell Roberts, Susan Oliver) a second chance. Note: Based on a short story by Shamus Frazier
63	16a	"Lindemann's Catch"	Jeff Corey	Rod Serling	Stuart Whitman, Jack Aranson, John Alderson, Harry Townes, Jim Boles, Ed Bakey, Matt Pelto, Michael Stanwood, Anabel Garth	January 12, 1972
A strange metamorphosis occurs when a sea captain (Stuart Whitman) captures a mermaid.
64	16b	"The Late Mr. Peddington"	Jeff Corey	Jack Laird	Harry Morgan, Kim Hunter, Randy Quaid	January 12, 1972
A widow (Kim Hunter) goes shopping for the cheapest funeral she can find for her husband. Note: Based on a short story "The Flat Male" by Frank Sisk
65	16c	"A Feast of Blood"	Jeannot Szwarc	Stanford Whitmore	Sondra Locke, Norman Lloyd, Hermione Baddeley, Pat O'Hara, Barry Bernard, Cara Burgess, Gerald S. Peter	January 12, 1972
A suitor (Norman Lloyd) gives a woman (Sondra Locke) a brooch that looks almost alive. Note: Based on a short story "The Fur Brooch" by Dulcie Gray
66	17a	"The Miracle at Camafeo"	Ralph Senensky	Rod Serling	Harry Guardino, Julie Adams, Ray Danton, Richard Yniguez, Rodolfo Hoyos, Margarita Garcia, Thomas Trujillo	January 19, 1972
An insurance agent (Harry Guardino) seeks to expose a swindler (Ray Danton) who plans to stage a cure for his fake paralysis at a Mexican shrine. Note: Based on a short story by C. B. Gilford
67	17b	"The Ghost of Sorworth Place"	Ralph Senensky	Alvin Sapinsley	Richard Kiley, Jill Ireland, Mavis Neal, Patrick O'Moore, John D. Schofield	January 19, 1972
An American tourist (Richard Kiley) protects a Scottish widow (Jill Ireland) from the ghost of her husband. Note: Based on the short story "Sorworth Place" by Russell Kirk
68	18a	"The Waiting Room"	Jeannot Szwarc	Rod Serling	Steve Forrest, Albert Salmi, Jim Davis, Lex Barker, Buddy Ebsen, Gilbert Roland, Larry Watson	January 26, 1972
A gunman (Steve Forrest) faces his day of reckoning.
69	18b	"Last Rites for a Dead Druid"	Jeannot Szwarc	Alvin Sapinsley	Bill Bixby, Carol Lynley, Donna Douglas, Ned Glass, Janya Brannt	January 26, 1972
A woman (Carol Lynley) is tempted to buy a statue that resembles her husband (Bill Bixby) ...and is modeled after a satanic sorcerer.
70	19a	"Deliveries in the Rear"	Jeff Corey	Rod Serling	Cornel Wilde, Rosemary Forsyth, Peter Whitney, Larry D. Mann, Walter Burke, Peter Brocco, Ian Wolfe, Marjorie E. Bennett, John Maddison, Gerald McRaney, Kent Smith	February 9, 1972
A surgery instructor (Cornel Wilde) uses cadavers from a most unexpected source.
71	19b	"Stop Killing Me"	Jeannot Szwarc	Jack Laird	Geraldine Page, James Gregory	February 9, 1972
A wife (Geraldine Page) believes her husband is attempting to worry her to death, and seeks the help of a police sergeant (James Gregory). Note: Based on a short story of the same title by Hal Dresner
72	19c	"Dead Weight"	Timothy Galfas	Jack Laird	Jack Albertson, Bobby Darin, James Metropole	February 9, 1972
An exporter (Jack Albertson) who helps gangsters on the lam has a client (Bobby Darin) like no other. Note: Based on the short story "Out of the Country" by Jeffry Scott
73	20a	"I'll Never Leave You – Ever"	Daniel Haller	Jack Laird	Lois Nettleton, Royal Dano, John Saxon, Peggy Webber	February 16, 1972
A wife (Lois Nettleton) uses witchcraft to murder her husband (Royal Dano), whose spirit goes on and on. Note: Based on a short story of the same title by Rene Morris
74	20b	"There Aren't Anymore MacBanes"	John Newland	Alvin Sapinsley	Joel Grey, Howard Duff, Darrell Larson, Barry Higgins, Mark Hamill, Vincent VanLynn, Ellen Blake	February 16, 1972
A student (Joel Grey) of sorcery summons an ancient spirit to get rid of his bothersome uncle (Howard Duff). Notes: Based on the short story "By One, By Two and By Three" by Stephen Hall; features a brief, early appearance by Mark Hamill.
75	21a	"The Sins of the Fathers"	Jeannot Szwarc	Halsted Welles	Geraldine Page, Richard Thomas, Michael Dunn, Cyril Delevanti, Alan Napier, Terence Pushman, John Barclay, Barbara Steele	February 23, 1972
Mrs. Evans' (Geraldine Page) son Ian (Richard Thomas) must take on his dying father's sins by feasting on food placed in front of his father's corpse. Note: Based on a short story of the same title by Christianna Brand.
76	21b	"You Can't Get Help Like That Anymore"	Jeff Corey	Rod Serling	Cloris Leachman, Broderick Crawford, Lana Wood, Henry Jones, Severn Darden, Pamela Shoop, Christopher Law, A'leshia Lee, Roberta Carol Brahm	February 23, 1972
A family's robot servants develop an instinct for survival.
77	22a	"The Caterpillar"	Jeannot Szwarc	Rod Serling	Laurence Harvey, Joanna Pettet, John Williams, Tom Helmore, Don Knight	March 1, 1972
A British expatriate (Laurence Harvey) in Borneo plots a gruesome assassination of a romantic rival (Tom Helmore). Note: Based on the short story "Boomerang" by Oscar Cook
78	22b	"Little Girl Lost"	Timothy Galfas	Stanford Whitmore	Ed Nelson, William Windom, Ivor Francis, John Lasell	March 1, 1972
A scientific genius is troubled by the death of his daughter. Note: Based on a short story of the same title by Edwin Charles Tubb. The running time as broadcast is 16:35. The Complete Series DVD set includes an extended version (running time 22:52) as a bonus feature. The episode also re-uses scenes from the movie Colossus: The Forbin Project.
79	22c	"Satisfaction Guaranteed"	Jeannot Szwarc	Jack Laird	Victor Buono, Cathleen Cordell, Marion Charles, Leigh Christian, Eve Curtis, Cherie Franklin	March 22, 1972
A secretarial agency presents various qualified candidates to a client, who rejects them all. He finally chooses a poorly qualified but plump candidate, and when asked when she should start, he replies that he will just eat her in the shop. Note: This segment was a replacement for "Witches' Feast" when episode 2-02 was repeated.

=== Season 3: 1972–73 ===
Season 3 changed to a 30-minute format. Previously, Night Gallery was a 60-minute program.

Night Gallery Pilot
No. overall	No. in season	Title	Directed by	Written by	Cast	Original release date
80	1	"The Return of the Sorcerer"	Jeannot Szwarc	Halsted Welles	Vincent Price, Patricia Sterling, Bill Bixby	September 24, 1972
A sorcerer (Vincent Price) hires a translator (Bill Bixby) to decode an ancient Arabic manuscript connected to his twin brother's death. Note: Based on a short story of the same title by Clark Ashton Smith
81	2	"The Girl with the Hungry Eyes"	John Badham	Robert Malcolm Young	James Farentino, John Astin, Joanna Pettet, Kip Niven, Bruce Powers	October 1, 1972
A photographer (James Farentino) hires a model (Joanna Pettet) whose eyes burn with a mysterious glow. Note: Based on a short story of the same title by Fritz Leiber
82	3	"Rare Objects"	Jeannot Szwarc	Rod Serling	Mickey Rooney, Raymond Massey, Fay Spain, David Fresco, Regis J. Cordic, Victor Sen Yung, Ralph Adano	October 22, 1972
A gangster named August Kolodney (Mickey Rooney) targeted for death meets a specialist (Raymond Massey) who guarantees him sanctuary...at a very high price.
83	4	"Spectre in Tap-Shoes"	Jeannot Szwarc	Gene R. Kearney (t), Jack Laird (s)	Sandra Dee, Dane Clark, Christopher Connelly, Russell Thorson, Michael Laird, Michael Richardson, Stuart Nisbet	October 29, 1972
A woman is haunted by the ghost of her sister (both played by Sandra Dee) who committed suicide.
84	5a	"You Can Come Up Now, Mrs. Millikan"	John Badham	Rod Serling	Ozzie Nelson, Harriet Nelson, Roger Davis, Michael Lerner, Don Keefer, Margaret Muse, Lew Brown, Stuart Nisbet	November 12, 1972
An inventor (Ozzie Nelson) and his wife (Harriet Nelson) trade in their clumsiness for an experiment in immortality. Note: Based on the short story "The Secret of the Vault" by J. Wesley Rosenquist
85	5b	"Smile, Please"	Jack Laird	Jack Laird	Cesare Danova, Lindsay Wagner	November 12, 1972
A woman (Lindsay Wagner) tries to get a photo of a vampire (Cesare Danova).
86	6	"The Other Way Out"	Gene Kearney	Gene R. Kearney (t), Kurt van Elting (s)	Ross Martin, Burl Ives, Peggy Feury, Jack Collins, Elizabeth Thompson, Paul Micale, Adam Weed	November 19, 1972
A murderer (Ross Martin) is lured to an isolated house where a cold, calculating avenger (Burl Ives) makes him pay for his crime.
87	7	"Fright Night"	Jeff Corey	Kurt van Elting (s), Robert Malcolm Young (t)	Stuart Whitman, Barbara Anderson, Ellen Corby, Alan Napier, Larry Watson, Michael Laird, Glenna Sergent	December 10, 1972
A young couple (Stuart Whitman, Barbara Anderson) inherits a farmhouse where they experience unseen terrors.
88	8	"Finnegan's Flight"	Gene Kearney	Rod Serling	Burgess Meredith, Cameron Mitchell, Barry Sullivan, Kenneth Tobey, Dort Clark, John Gilgreen, Roger Mosley, Raymond Mayo, Michael Masters	December 17, 1972
A prison lifer (Burgess Meredith) wishing for freedom subjects himself to his cellmate's (Cameron Mitchell) mind-over-matter experiments.
89	9	"She'll Be Company for You"	Gerald Perry Finnerman	David Rayfiel	Leonard Nimoy, Lorraine Gary, Kathryn Hays, Bern Hoffman	December 24, 1972
A widower (Leonard Nimoy) is watched by a strangely menacing cat. Note: Based on a short story of the same title by Andrea Newman
90	10	"The Ring with the Red Velvet Ropes"	Jeannot Szwarc	Robert Malcolm Young	Gary Lockwood, Joan Van Ark, Chuck Connors, Ralph Manza, Charles Davis, Ji-Tu Cumbuka, James Bacon, Frankie Van	January 7, 1973
A boxing champ (Gary Lockwood) learns he has one more bout before he can claim the title. Note: Based on a short story of the same title by Edward D. Hoch
91	11	"Something in the Woodwork"	Edward M. Abroms	Rod Serling	Geraldine Page, Leif Erickson, Paul Jenkins, John McMurtry, Barbara Rhoades	January 14, 1973
An alcoholic woman (Geraldine Page) asks a reluctant ghost for help in her plot for revenge against her ex-husband (Leif Erickson). Note: Based on the short story "Housebound" by R. Chetwynd-Hayes
92	12	"Death on a Barge"	Leonard Nimoy	Halsted Welles	Lesley Warren, Lou Antonio, Brooke Bundy, Robert Pratt, Jim Boles, Artie Spain, Dorothy Konrad, De De Young	March 4, 1973
A fishmonger ignores his friends' warnings when he falls for a vampire (Lesley Warren). Note: Based on the short story "The Canal" by Everil Worrell; Nimoy's directing debut
93	13	"Whisper"	Jeannot Szwarc	David Rayfiel	Dean Stockwell, Sally Field, Kent Smith	May 13, 1973
Irene, a young woman (Sally Field), listens to the voices of the dead. Charlie (Dean Stockwell) is her husband and caretaker. Note: Based on a short story by Martin Waddell
94	14	"The Doll of Death"	John Badham	Jack Guss	Susan Strasberg, Alejandro Rey, Murray Matheson, Barry Atwater, Jean Durand, Henry Brandon	May 20, 1973
An Englishman (Barry Atwater) uses voodoo to get revenge on a romantic rival (Alejandro Rey). Note: Based on a short story by Vivian Meik
95	15a	"Hatred unto Death"	Gerald Perry Finnerman	Halsted Welles	Steve Forrest, Dina Merrill, Fernando Lamas, George Barrows, Caro Kenyatta, Ed Rue, David Tyrone	May 27, 1973
Anthropologists (Steve Forrest, Dina Merrill) respond to a captive gorilla's primeval hatred.
96	15b	"How to Cure the Common Vampire"	Jack Laird	Jack Laird	Richard Deacon, Johnny Brown	May 27, 1973
Two men (Richard Deacon, Johnny Brown) debate the best way to kill vampires.

=== Syndication-only segments ===
These segments were produced for season 2 but were not aired during the original broadcast run.

Night Gallery syndication-only segments
No. overall	No. in season	Title	Directed by	Written by	Cast	Original release date
97	1	"Die Now, Pay Later"	Timothy Galfas	Jack Laird (t), Mary Linn Roby (s)	Will Geer, Slim Pickens	October 10, 1973 (Tampa Bay)
An undertaker (Will Geer) slashes funeral prices at a January clearance sale. Note: This segment was produced for the second season but never aired during the series' original broadcast.
98	2	"Room for One Less"	Jack Laird	Jack Laird	Lee Jay Lambert, James Metropole	March 17, 1974 (Chicago)
A creature teaches an elevator operator some manners. Note: This segment was produced for the second season but never aired during the series's original broadcast.

=== Unproduced scripts ===
Throughout the run of the series, several scripts and stories (most of which were written or adapted by Serling) were considered and were either rejected or left unproduced for various reasons.

"A Gentleman from Prague"

Based on a short story by August Derleth, the story involves a man named Simon Dekrugh. Arriving home in Britain after traveling on the continent, he calls his business associate, Abel Speers. When the latter arrives, the two examine and discuss a gold chain that Dekrugh stole from a grave in Europe; then, the occupant of the grave turns up.

"No Such Thing as a Vampire"

Based on a short story by Richard Matheson, the story takes place in a small town in Transylvania. A doctor's wife discovers puncture marks on her neck, and fears abound that she is being attacked by a vampire.
(Note: The story was later adapted as a segment in the 1977 film, Dead of Night).

"Does The Name Grimsby Do Anything to You?" — Written By Rod Serling

This story delves into the delicate psyche of an astronaut, driven by his Type-A zeal to be the first man to walk on the lunar surface. He unravels when he finds, and destroys, evidence during his Moon walk that he was, in fact, second to an obscure and discredited scientist from a century earlier.
(Note: Although presented during the early planning stages for the show, the idea was jettisoned. However, Serling later developed it into a short story and included it in the 1971 book, Night Gallery).

"Let Me Live in a House"

Based on a story by Chad Oliver, this story dealt with questions of existence and identity, the Kafka-esque "puppets on a stage" concept, previously explored on The Twilight Zone.

"Nightmare Morning"

An adaptation of Robert A. Heinlein's "They", the story revolves around a delusional patient in a New York hospital who believes his reality has been manufactured by an alien culture as a zoo environment for him as Earth's last survivor; his delusion turns out to be real.

"Reflections"

A retread of "The Cemetery".

"Let Me Tell You about the Dead"

Based on Graham Greene's "A Little Place off the Edgware Road", it tells of a man named Craven, who tries to convince others of his delusion that the dead have been rising from their graves; in a second story thread, there is a ripper-type killer on the loose. Both story threads merge when Craven meets one of the ripper's victims, zombified, in a darkened movie theater.

"Quartette Doomed"

A thinly disguised take on Agatha Christie's "And Then There Were None", stocked with characters out of a poor radio drama: the loudmouthed Texas Oil Man, The Effete Society Columnist, The Obsequious Backstabbing Assistant, and The Gold-Digging Ex-Chorus Liner. They are invited to witness the reading of a dead mystic's will, and instead of bequeathing to them his riches, he hands them all death sentences for their part in ruining his life. For the rest of the play, the four characters try to avoid the circumstances of their demise.

"The Onlooker" — Written By Rod Serling

This story follows the story of a cold-eyed hit man who loses his professional cool, then his life, when he tries to escape a mysterious man who dogs his trail, Death.

"How Does Your Garden Grow"

An adaptation of John Collier's short story "Green Thoughts," a character study involving an old gardener, his cat, a pair of dotty neighbors, a young girl claiming to be the widow of the old gardener's dead son, and a man-eating plant.

"The View Of Whatever" — Written By Rod Serling

This story tells of Joe Sprague, who suffers the loss of his only son during the Vietnam War. In deep depression, he develops a desperate desire to escape from a present he hates. Taking form as a strange delusion, he claims that his childhood past can be viewed from his bedroom window, which is a portal into 1930s Binghamton, New York. The despairing Sprague takes his chance and steps through the window, to find himself ten years old and in that summer. Ultimately, he looks pensively into the camera as the viewer dissolves to the present from which he escaped. Sprague's family is distraught at finding him missing. Sprague's family doctor, Ike Colby, tries to console them, but as he looks out Sprague's bedroom window, the portal shows him his own past — a wave-lapped shore in a tropical setting and a familiar, dark-haired woman beckoning. As the vision fades, Colby finds comfort in knowing that Joe Sprague has finally gone home.

"Where Seldom Is Heard" — written by Gene Kearney

This story is a vignette, an extended sketch with its punch line turning on hunchbacked bell ringer Quasimodo's deafness.

== Sources ==
- Skelton, Scott; Benson, Jim (1998). Rod Serling's Night gallery: an after-hours tour (1st ed.). Syracuse, New York: Syracuse University Press. ISBN 978-0-8156-2782-1.
