= The Curious Quests of Brigadier Ffellowes =

- Cover of The Curious Quests of Brigadier Ffellowes
- Author: Sterling E. Lanier
- Illustrator: Ned Dameron
- Cover artist: Ned Dameron
- Language: English
- Series: Brigadier Ffellowes
- Genre: Fantasy
- Publisher: Donald M. Grant, Publisher, Inc.
- Publication date: 1986
- Publication place: United States
- Media type: Print (hardback)
- Pages: 254
- ISBN: 0-937986-89-5
- OCLC: 15626832
- Dewey Decimal: 813/.54 19
- LC Class: PS3562.A52 C8 1986
- Preceded by: The Peculiar Exploits of Brigadier Ffellowes

The Curious Quests of Brigadier Ffellowes is a collection of fantasy short stories by American writer Sterling E. Lanier. The stories take the form of tall tales told in a bar or club, similar to the Jorkens stories of Lord Dunsany. It was first published in 1986 by Donald M. Grant, Publisher, Inc. in an edition of 1,200 copies; each copy was signed by the author and artist. The last story is original to this collection. The other stories first appeared in the magazine Fantasy and Science Fiction.

== Contents ==
- "Introduction" (Donald M. Grant)
- "Fore/Thought/Word"
- "Ghost of a Crown" (1976)
- "And the Voice of the Turtle ..." (1972)
- "A Father's Tale" (1974)
- "Commander in the Mist" (1982)
- "Thinking of the Unthinkable" (1973)
- "The Brigadier in Check — and Mate"

== Sources ==
- Brown, Charles N.; William G. Contento (2007-11-20). "The Locus Index to Science Fiction (1984-1998)".
- Chalker, Jack L.; Mark Owings (1998). The Science-Fantasy Publishers: A Bibliographic History, 1923-1998. Westminster, MD and Baltimore: Mirage Press, Ltd. p. 332.
