= The Travel Tales of Mr. Joseph Jorkens =

Collection of fantasy short stories by Lord Dunsany (1931)

- First edition
- Author: Lord Dunsany
- Language: English
- Series: Jorkens
- Genre: Fantasy
- Publisher: G. P. Putnam's Sons
- Publication date: 1931
- Publication place: United Kingdom
- Media type: Print (hardback)
- Followed by: Jorkens Remembers Africa

The Travel Tales of Mr. Joseph Jorkens is a collection of fantasy short stories by writer Lord Dunsany. It was first published in London by G. P. Putnam's Sons in April, 1931, with the American edition following in September of the same year from the same publisher. It was the first collection of Dunsany's Jorkens tales to be published. It has also been issued in combination with the second book, Jorkens Remembers Africa, in the omnibus edition The Collected Jorkens, Volume One, published by Night Shade Books in 2004.

The Jorkens stories are set in the London gentleman's or adventurer's club of which the title character is a member. They usually open with another member mentioning an interesting experience he has had; this rouses Jorkens, who in return for a whisky-and-soda (merely to "moisten his throat," you understand!) goes the other member one better with an extraordinary tall tale, supposedly from his own past. His stories often tip well over the boundaries of the plausible, into the realms of fantasy, horror, or even science fiction, and his auditors can never be quite sure what proportion of what he relates was truly experienced and to what degree he might have embellished.

The initial Jorkens collection includes thirteen short pieces by Dunsany.

== Contents ==
- "Preface"
- "The Tale of the Abu Laheeb"
- "The King of Sarahb"
- "How Jembu Played for Cambridge"
- "The Charm against Thirst"
- "Our Distant Cousins"
- "A Large Diamond"
- "A Queer Island"
- "The Electric King"
- "A Drink at a Running Stream"
- "A Daughter of Rameses"
- "The Showman"
- "Mrs. Jorkens"
- "The Witch of the Willows"

== Importance ==
Dunsany's Jorkens stories, themselves in the tradition of such tall tales as the Baron Munchausen stories, essentially established the genre of the fantastic tall club or bar tale, inspiring such disparate later descendants as L. Sprague de Camp and Fletcher Pratt's Tales from Gavagan's Bar, Arthur C. Clarke's Tales from the White Hart, Sterling E. Lanier's Brigadier Ffellowes stories, Larry Niven's The Draco Tavern stories, Isaac Asimov's Black Widowers mysteries, Spider Robinson's tales of Callahan's Place, and even the animated cartoon series "The World of Commander McBragg".

Typically, the club tale features one particular raconteur notorious for his colorful history and unbelievable reminiscences, who relates memoirs of his life to initially incredulous fellow club members; by the end of the story the latter are usually at least half taken in by the unlikely tale, and count the expense well worth it. Major variations include a recurring cast of club members or bar regulars with the story-teller being an outsider, non-fantastic (but still interesting) tales, or settings that are themselves fantastic, rendering the tales themselves more believable within their fictional context. The format has proven endlessly adaptable, with notable instances to be found in the science fiction (Clarke and Robinson) and mystery (Asimov) genres as well as fantasy.
