= The Peculiar Exploits of Brigadier Ffellowes =

1971 short story collection by Sterling E. Lanier

- Cover of The Peculiar Exploits of Brigadier Ffellowes
- Author: Sterling E. Lanier
- Language: English
- Series: Brigadier Ffellowes
- Genre: Fantasy
- Publisher: Walker
- Publication date: 1971
- Publication place: United States
- Media type: Print (hardback)
- Pages: 159 pp
- ISBN: 0-8027-5548-8
- OCLC: 357403
- Dewey Decimal: 813/.5/4
- LC Class: PZ4.L289 Pe3 PS3562.A52
- Followed by: The Curious Quests of Brigadier Ffellowes

The Peculiar Exploits of Brigadier Ffellowes is a collection of fantasy short stories by Sterling E. Lanier. The stories take the form of tall tales told in a bar or club, similar to the Jorkens stories of Lord Dunsany. It was first published in New York by Walker in 1971, and in London by Sidgwick & Jackson in 1977. The English edition includes an introduction by Arthur C. Clarke. The collection was also published together with John Morressy's Frostworld and Dreamfire as the Sidgwick & Jackson double Science Fiction Special 35 in 1981. The stories originally appeared in issues of the Fantasy and Science Fiction between August 1968 and July 1970.

== Contents ==
- "Introduction" (Arthur C. Clarke) (English edition and later American edition only)
- "His Only Safari" (1970)
- "The Kings of the Sea" (1968)
- "His Coat So Gay" (1965)
- "The Leftovers" (1969)
- "A Feminine Jurisdiction" (1969)
- "Fraternity Brother" (1969)
- "Soldier Key" (1968)

== Reception ==
P. Schuyler Miller in Analog Science Fiction/Science Fact classes the Ffellowes stories among the "tall tales well told" in the Odyssey, the Sindbad cycle, and the modern instances of the Jorkens, Gavagan's Bar, and White Hart tales, which he calls "the basic bones and blood of fiction. I've missed them, and I missed this collection for too long. Don't let it happen to you." After surveying the strange creatures encountered in the brigadier's narratives, he concludes "[t]hey are grand tales, every one. ... I hope there will be more, and soon!"

The collection was also reviewed by Gahan Wilson in The Magazine of Fantasy and Science Fiction, December 1973, Juanita Coulson in Yandro #225, February 1974, John Clute in Vector 81, 1977, and John Sladek in Foundation #13, May 1978.
