= Hiero's Journey =

1973 science fiction novel by Sterling E. Lanier

- First edition
- Author: Sterling E. Lanier
- Cover artist: Jack Freas
- Language: English
- Genre: Post-apocalyptic science fiction
- Published: 1973
- Publisher: Chilton Book Co.
- Publication place: United States

Hiero's Journey is a post-apocalyptic science fiction novel by American writer Sterling E. Lanier first published in 1973 by Chilton Book Co.

== Plot ==
The novel follows the adventures of a priest by the name of Per Hiero Desteen, a descendant of the ancient Métis people, as he explores the mutant-infested wilderness of Canada and North America five millennia after an event called The Death destroyed civilization (7476 A.D.). Riding a mutant moose named Klootz, with which he is able to communicate telepathically, Hiero is on a secret mission to uncover the secret of the computer, pre-death technology which could help coordinate his people's defence against evil forces which are slowly subverting, corrupting and encircling his civilisation.

Hiero's eventual allies include Gorm, a telepathic black bear, Luchare, a princess from the distant kingdom of D'alwah, and the Eleveners, followers of the Eleventh Commandment, "Thou shalt not destroy the Earth or the life thereon".

On his journey, Hiero faces many dangers, including mutated humans, mutant beasts, pirates, and the evil forces of The Brotherhood of the Unclean, ancient enemies of the Eleveners, who are desperate to learn the secret of Hiero's mission and stop him from undoing their evil plans.

== Reception and influence ==
David Pringle called Hiero's Journey "a picaresque sf/fantasy which has been very popular" and rated the book two stars out of four.

Several reviewers note that the novel reflects Cold War sensibilities, including fears of a nuclear holocaust wiping out civilization. The presence of a Christian religious order is also reminiscent of the novel A Canticle for Leibowitz.

Hiero's Journey was the first book in a planned trilogy, with the sequel, The Unforsaken Hiero, published in January 1983.

Gary Gygax, co-creator of Dungeons & Dragons, credits Hiero's Journey as an influence on Dungeons & Dragons in Appendix N of the AD&D Dungeon Master's Guide. The novel is also credited as a direct influence for another TSR roleplaying game, the post-apocalyptic RPG Gamma World.
