= Appendix N =

Dungeons & Dragons inspirational bibliography

Appendix N is a list of books and authors which informed the creation of Dungeons & Dragons. The term now covers a loose literary aesthetic of pulp fantasy and planetary romance.

== History ==
The Advanced Dungeons & Dragons Dungeon Master's Guide (1979) was a book written by Gary Gygax to help people run games of Dungeons & Dragons (D&D). It contained a series of appendices, including one titled "Appendix N: Inspirational and Educational Reading". Appendix N was a list of authors and works that were identified by Gary Gygax as the source of many concepts, tropes, spells and monsters that were used in the development of D&D.

The list specifies 28 authors, 22 specific books, and 12 different book series; it is one of the foundations on which fantasy roleplaying was built. A revised and expanded version of the list was published as "Appendix E: Inspirational Reading", in the 5th Edition Player's Handbook (2014).

Appendix N is now used to describe a subset of imaginative fantasy and science fiction from the early-to-mid 20th Century that predates the global mass media popularity of the genre; much of the work in the list was originally published as serials in pulp magazines of the 1930s.

== Impact on D&D ==
Appendix N set the tone for fantasy roleplaying. The early design of D&D drew so widely from Appendix N influences, that very few of the classic monsters are even claimed as Product Identity by Wizards of the Coast (notable exceptions including the Beholder and the Mind Flayer). According to Appendix N researcher, Jeffro Johnson, if you read Appendix N then a great many of the oddities of classic D&D will start to make sense.

Gary Gygax has stated that D&D was not meant to recreate the work of any one specific author in the Appendix, but his list singled out the impact of L. Sprague de Camp & Fletcher Pratt, Robert E. Howard, Fritz Leiber, Jack Vance, H. P. Lovecraft, and A. Merritt over the others. The impact of J. R. R. Tolkien is also evident in races such as the Halfling (originally Hobbit), the division of elves, the ubiquitous orc, and the Ranger character class (after Aragorn), although Gygax professed Tolkien's impact was "minimal" and dismissed the Ring Trilogy as "tedious".

D&D's influential alignment system of Law vs Chaos was derived from the Elric stories of Michael Moorcock and their precursors in Poul Anderson’s Three Hearts and Three Lions, which also inspired the player character class of Paladin. The player character class of Barbarian is a direct nod to Robert E. Howard’s Conan stories, although this remains the subject of debate among fans who class the character variously as a fighter, thief, or hybrid of the two. The concept of dungeons with multiple levels connected by secret doors is derived from Margaret St. Clair, especially Sign of the Labrys, while the inspiration for the Drow and the Underdark were derived from both Merritt and St Clair.

D&D's engine of memorised spells is known as the "Vancian magic system" after the work of Jack Vance, who also inspired the Thief player class, and several early spells. Vance freely gave permission to Gygax to use his Ioun Stones as a magical item in the game on the condition that his books received a mention (as they then did in the Appendix).

However, not everyone was as happy to be so influential: the first edition of the Deities & Demigods reference book included statistics for nonhuman characters from the Cthulhu Mythos of H.P. Lovecraft and the Melnibonéan mythos from Michael Moorcock, both of which were the subject of legal threats and were removed from subsequent editions. TSR was served with papers threatening damages to the tune of half a million dollars by Elan Merchandising on behalf of the Tolkien Estate in connection with D&D and a Five Armies game. TSR were told to removed Balrog, Dragon, Dwarf, Elf, Ent, Goblin, Hobbit, Orc, and Warg from the game, but eventually all but Hobbit, Ent and Balrog were ruled as public domain.

== Works listed in Appendix N ==
Works cited but not formally listed include EC Comics books, medieval bestiaries and fairy tales. The original list did not feature Clark Ashton Smith, which Gygax later addressed as an omission. Some of the books and series include an "et al.", indicating that their further works were also partially included in the list.

=== Authors ===
- Leigh Brackett
- Fredric Brown
- August Derleth
- Lord Dunsany
- H. P. Lovecraft
- Andre Norton
- Stanley Weinbaum
- Manly Wade Wellman
- Jack Williamson

=== Series ===
- Edgar Rice Burroughs: "Pellucidar" series; "Barsoom" series; "Venus" series
- Lin Carter: "World's End" series
- Philip José Farmer: "The World of the Tiers" series; et al.
- Gardner Fox: "Kothar" series; "Kyrik" series; et al.
- R. E. Howard: "Conan" series
- Fritz Leiber: "Fafhrd and the Gray Mouser" series; et al.
- L. Sprague de Camp & Pratt: "Harold Shea" series
- Michael Moorcock, "Hawkmoon" series (esp. the first three books)
- J. R. R. Tolkien: "Lord of the Rings" trilogy
- Roger Zelazny: "Amber" series; et al.

=== Books ===
- Poul Anderson: Three Hearts and Three Lions; The High Crusade; The Broken Sword
- John Bellairs: The Face in the Frost
- De Camp, L. Sprague: Lest Darkness Fall; The Fallible Fiend; et al.
- De Camp & Pratt: The Carnelian Cube
- Sterling Lanier: Hiero's Journey
- A. Merritt: Creep, Shadow, Creep; The Moon Pool; Dwellers in the Mirage; et al.
- Michael Moorcock: Stormbringer; Stealer of Souls
- Andrew J. Offutt: Editor of Swords Against Darkness III
- Fletcher Pratt: The Blue Star; et al.
- Fred Saberhagen: Changeling Earth; et al.
- Margaret St. Clair: The Shadow People; Sign of the Labrys
- J. R. R. Tolkien: The Hobbit
- Jack Vance: The Eyes of the Overworld; The Dying Earth; et al.
- Roger Zelazny: Jack of Shadows

== Legacy and cultural impact ==
Appendix N reflects the canon of fantasy literature at the end of the '70s. The amalgamation of fantasy tropes into the original D&D in the late 70s has been identified by Michael Moorcock as a period marked by the creation of a fresh genre of fantasy literature, whereas the work that came before was often within the now-obsolete genres of planetary romance or weird fiction.

Appendix N was instrumental in the foundation of fantasy roleplaying and has been important to the OSR "Old School Renaissance" of roleplaying games. Games designer, Joseph Goodman, read every book in Appendix N to create the Gygax-inspired OSR RPG Dungeon Crawl Classics (DCC). Many of the published modules for the game directly reference some of the Appendix N texts, such as Peril on the Purple Planet, which is inspired by Edgar Rice Burroughs. DCC have also published campaign settings for adventures set in the worlds of Fritz Leiber and Jack Vance.

Jeffro Johnson's book on his journey through Appendix N was nominated for the Hugo Award in 2016. In 2022, Ernie Gygax Jr. nominated Shagduk by J.B. Jackson as an honorary Appendix N title.

Others have also endeavored to read the entirety of Appendix N, including games designer Martin Ralya; Ralya maintains a blog on his quest. There are multiple podcasts exploring and reviewing all of the books in Appendix N, including Sanctum Secorum and the Ennie Award-nominated (2022) Appendix N Book Club.

== See also ==
- Dungeon Master's Guide
- Gary Gygax
