= Time and the Gods (omnibus) =

Collection of six books by Lord Dunsany

- Cover of the first edition
- Author: Lord Dunsany
- Language: English
- Genre: Fantasy
- Publisher: Orion Books
- Publication date: 2000
- Publication place: United Kingdom
- Media type: Print (paperback)
- Pages: viii, 584
- ISBN: 1-85798-989-9
- OCLC: 42912908

Time and the Gods is an omnibus collection of fantasy stories by Anglo-Irish writer Lord Dunsany. It was first published by Orion Books in 2000 as the second volume of their Fantasy Masterworks series. This omnibus contains all the stories from Dunsany's earlier collections: The Gods of Pegāna (1905), Time and the Gods (1906), The Sword of Welleran and Other Stories (1908), A Dreamer's Tales (1910), The Book of Wonder (1912), and The Last Book of Wonder (1916).

== Contents ==
- Part One: Time and the Gods
  - "Time and the Gods"
  - "The Coming of the Sea"
  - "A Legend of the Dawn"
  - "The Vengeance of Men"
  - "When the Gods Slept"
  - "The King That Was Not"
  - "The Cave of Kai"
  - "The Sorrow of Search"
  - "The Men of Yarnith"
  - "For the Honour of the Gods"
  - "Night and Morning"
  - "Usury"
  - "Mlideen"
  - "The Secret of the Gods"
  - "The South Wind"
  - "In the Land of Time"
  - "The Relenting of Sardinac"
  - "The Jest of the Gods"
  - "The Dreams of the Prophet"
  - "The Journey of the King"
- Part Two: The Sword of Welleran
  - "The Sword of Welleran"
  - "The Fall of Bubbulkund"
  - "The Kith of the Elf-Folk"
  - "The Highwayman"
  - "In the Twilight"
  - "The Ghosts"
  - "The Whirlpool"
  - "The Hurricane"
  - "The Fortress Unvanquishable, Save for Sacnoth"
  - "The Lord of Cities"
  - "The Doom of La Traviata"
  - "On the Dry Land"
- Part Three: A Dreamer's Tales
  - "Poltarnees, Beholder of Ocean"
  - "Bladgaross"
  - "The Madness of Andelsprutz"
  - "Where the Tides Ebb and Flow"
  - "Bethmoora"
  - "Idle Days on the Yann"
  - "The Sword and the Idol"
  - "The Idle City"
  - "The Hashish Man"
  - "Poor Old Bill"
  - "The Beggars"
  - "Carcassonne"
  - "In Zaccarath"
  - "The Field"
  - "The Day of the Poll"
  - "The Unhappy Body"
- Part Four: The Book of Wonder
  - "The Bride of the Man-Horse"
  - "The Distressing Tale of Thangobrind the Jeweller"
  - "The House of the Sphinx"
  - "The Probable Adventure of the Three Literary Men"
  - "The Injudicious Prayers of Pombo the Idolator"
  - "The Loot of Bombasharna"
  - "Miss Cubbidge and the Dragon of Romance"
  - "The Quest of the Queen's Tears"
  - "The Hoard of the Gibbelins"
  - "How Nuth Would Have Practised His Art upon the Gnoles"
  - "How One Came, as Was Foretold, to the City of Never"
  - "The Coronation of Mr. Thomas Shap"
  - "Chu-Bu and Sheemish"
  - "The Wonderful Window"
  - "Epilogue"
- Part Five: The Last Book of Wonder
  - "A Tale of London"
  - "Thirteen at Table"
  - "The City on Mallington Moor"
  - "Why the Milkman Shudders When He Perceives the Dawn"
  - "The Bad Old Woman in Black"
  - "The Bird of the Difficult Eye"
  - "The Long Porter's Tale"
  - "The Loot of Loma"
  - "The Secret of the Sea"
  - "How Ali Came to the Black Country"
  - "The Bureau d'Echange de Maux"
  - "A Story of Land and Sea"
  - "A Tale of the Equator"
  - "A Narrow Escape"
  - "The Watch-Tower"
  - "How Plash-Goo Came to the Land of None's Desire"
  - "The Three Sailors' Gambit"
  - "The Exiles' Club"
  - "The Three Infernal Jokes"
- Part Six: The Gods of Pegāna
  - "Preface"
  - "The Gods of Pegāna"
  - "Of Skarl the Drummer"
  - "Of the Making of the Worlds"
  - "Of the Game of the Gods"
  - "The Chaunt of the Gods"
  - "The Sayings of Kib"
  - "Concerning Sish"
  - "The Sayings of Slid"
  - "The Deeds of Mung"
  - "The Chaunt of the Priests"
  - "The Sayings of Limpang-Tung"
  - "Of Yoharneth-Lahai"
  - "Of Roon, the God of Going"
  - "The Revolt of the Home Gods"
  - "Of Dorozhand"
  - "The Eye in the Waste"
  - "Of the Thing That Is Neither God Nor Beast"
  - "Yonath the Prophet"
  - "Yug the Prophet"
  - "Alhireth-Hotep the Prophet"
  - "Kabok the Prophet"
  - "Of the Calamity That Befel Yūn-Ilāra"
  - "Of How the Gods Whelmed Sidith"
  - "Of How Imbaun Became High Prophet in Aradec of All the Gods Save One"
  - "Of How Imbaun Met Zodrak"
  - "Pegāna"
  - "The Sayings of Imbaun"
  - "Of How Imbaun Spake of Death to the King"
  - "Of Ood"
  - "The River"
  - "The Bird of Doom and the End"
