= The Curse of the Wise Woman =

Novel by Lord Dunsany (1933)

First edition (publ. Heinemann)

The Curse of the Wise Woman (1933) is a novel by Lord Dunsany, differing from his earlier books by its Irish setting and restrained use of fantasy elements. It won the Harmsworth Award for the best work of imaginative prose by an Irish author.

== Synopsis ==
The plot concerns a motherless teenaged Anglo-Irish gentleman of the 1890s whose father has been forced to flee the country. Left in charge of the family estates, he uses his freedom to indulge his love of field sports, focusing especially on wildfowl-shooting on a nearby peat bog. There is an extended chapter narrating a magnificent fox hunt, whose trophy, the brush, forms the focus of a poignant moment in the coda, in the narrator's old age. When he discovers that the existence of the bog is threatened by an industrial peat-cutting syndicate he finds no effective ally except an old woman who believes herself to be a "wise woman", or witch. The syndicate is defeated either by her occult powers or by the unaided forces of nature, just as the reader chooses to believe.

== Composition ==
Elements of the book had been in Dunsany's mind for some years before he finally came to write it, but it was only repeated encouragement from his wife that finally led him to write the novel. She also induced him to add some love interest to the story. The process of composition, when it finally came, only took 15 weeks, from February to May 1933. The Curse of the Wise Woman was published later that year by William Collins.

== Reception ==
The book received excellent reviews on its first publication, and was chosen by John Masefield to receive the Harmsworth Award for the best work of imaginative prose by an Irish author. It stayed in print for some twenty years, and was reprinted in 1972. In his introduction to a 1976 reissue Dennis Wheatley said that it would "appeal to those who love shooting, hunting and magnificent descriptions of the beauties of nature". Mark Amory, writing in 1972, called it "now the best-known and loved of all his work"; he noted that the author's prose was here "eloquent but under control", and that it had "a feeling for the country and country people". The Dunsany scholar Darrell Schweitzer considered it his finest novel. He felt that the Irish countryside "comes across so vividly that the reader is all but transported there", but he nevertheless emphasised the importance of its otherworldly elements: "between the finest magical cursing and conjuring scenes Dunsany ever wrote and the vision of Tir-nan-Og, the book has the feel of the purest fantasy". Both critics were agreed in calling it an unusually autobiographical Dunsany novel. S. T. Joshi called The Curse of the Wise Woman Dunsany's most unified novel, while an anonymous Kirkus reviewer offered the contrary opinion that it fell between the two schools of mysticism and rustic realism.

== Reprint ==
In 2014 Valancourt Books brought The Curse of the Wise Woman back into print with a new introduction by Mark Valentine.
