= Jorkens Remembers Africa =

Book by Lord Dunsany (1934)

- US dust jacket for Jorkens Remembers Africa by Lord Dunsany
- Author: Lord Dunsany
- Language: English
- Series: Jorkens
- Genre: fantasy short stories
- Publisher: Longmans, Green & Co.
- Publication date: 1934
- Publication place: United States; United Kingdom
- English publication date: 1934
- Media type: Print (hardback)
- Preceded by: The Travel Tales of Mr. Joseph Jorkens
- Followed by: Jorkens Has a Large Whiskey

Jorkens Remembers Africa is a collection of fantasy short stories, narrated by Mr. Joseph Jorkens, by writer Lord Dunsany. It was first published in New York City by Longmans, Green & Co. in October, 1934, with the English edition (under the alternate title Mr. Jorkens Remembers Africa) following in November of the same year from the same publisher. It was the second collection of Dunsany's Jorkens tales to be published. It has also been issued in combination with the first book, The Travel Tales of Mr. Joseph Jorkens, in the omnibus edition The Collected Jorkens, Volume One, published by Night Shade Books in 2004.

The book collects twenty-one short pieces by Dunsany.

== Contents ==
- Preface
- "The Lost Romance"
- "The Curse of the Witch"
- "The Pearly Beach"
- "The Walk to Lingham"
- "The Escape from the Valley"
- "One August in the Red Sea"
- "The Bare Truth"
- "What Jorkens Has to Put Up With"
- "Ozymandias"
- "At the End of the Universe"
- "The Black Mamba"
- "In the Garden of Memories"
- "The Slugly Beast"
- "Earth's Secret"
- "The Persian Spell"
- "Stranger Than Fiction"
- "The Golden Gods"
- "The Correct Kit"
- "How Ryan Got out of Russia"
- "The Club Secretary"
- "A Mystery of the East"
