= Jorkens Has a Large Whiskey =

Book by Lord Dunsany (1940)

- Dust-jacket for Jorkens Has a Large Whiskey by Lord Dunsany
- Author: Lord Dunsany
- Language: English
- Series: Jorkens
- Genre: fantasy short stories
- Publisher: Putnam
- Publication date: 1940
- Publication place: United Kingdom
- Preceded by: Jorkens Remembers Africa
- Followed by: The Fourth Book of Jorkens

Jorkens Has a Large Whiskey is a collection of fantasy short stories, narrated by Mr. Joseph Jorkens, by writer Lord Dunsany. It was first published in London by Putnam in September, 1940. It was the third collection of Dunsany's Jorkens tales to be published. It has also been issued in combination with the fourth book, The Fourth Book of Jorkens, and two uncollected short stories, in the omnibus edition The Collected Jorkens, Volume Two, published by Night Shade Books in 2004.

As noted by S. T. Joshi and many book dealers, this volume was and remains very scarce. It collects twenty-six short pieces by Dunsany.

== Contents ==
- "Preface"
- "Jorkens' Revenge"
- "Jorkens Retires from Business"
- "Jorkens Handles a Big Property"
- "The Invention of Dr. Caber"
- "The Grecian Singer"
- "The Jorkens Family Emeralds"
- "A Fishing Story"
- "Jorkens in High Finance"
- "The Sign"
- "The Angelic Shepherd"
- "The Neapolitan Ice"
- "The Development of the Rillswood Estate"
- "The Fancy Man"
- "The Lion and the Unicorn"
- "A Doubtful Story"
- "Jorkens Looks Forward"
- "Jorkens Among the Ghosts"
- "Elephant Shooting"
- "African Magic"
- "Jorkens Consults a Prophet"
- "A Matter of Business"
- "The Invention of the Age"
- "The Sultan, the Monkey and the Banana"
- "Pundleton's Audience"
- "The Fight in the Drawing-Room"
- "The Ivory Poacher"
