= Margaret St. Clair =

American speculative fiction writer (1911–1995)

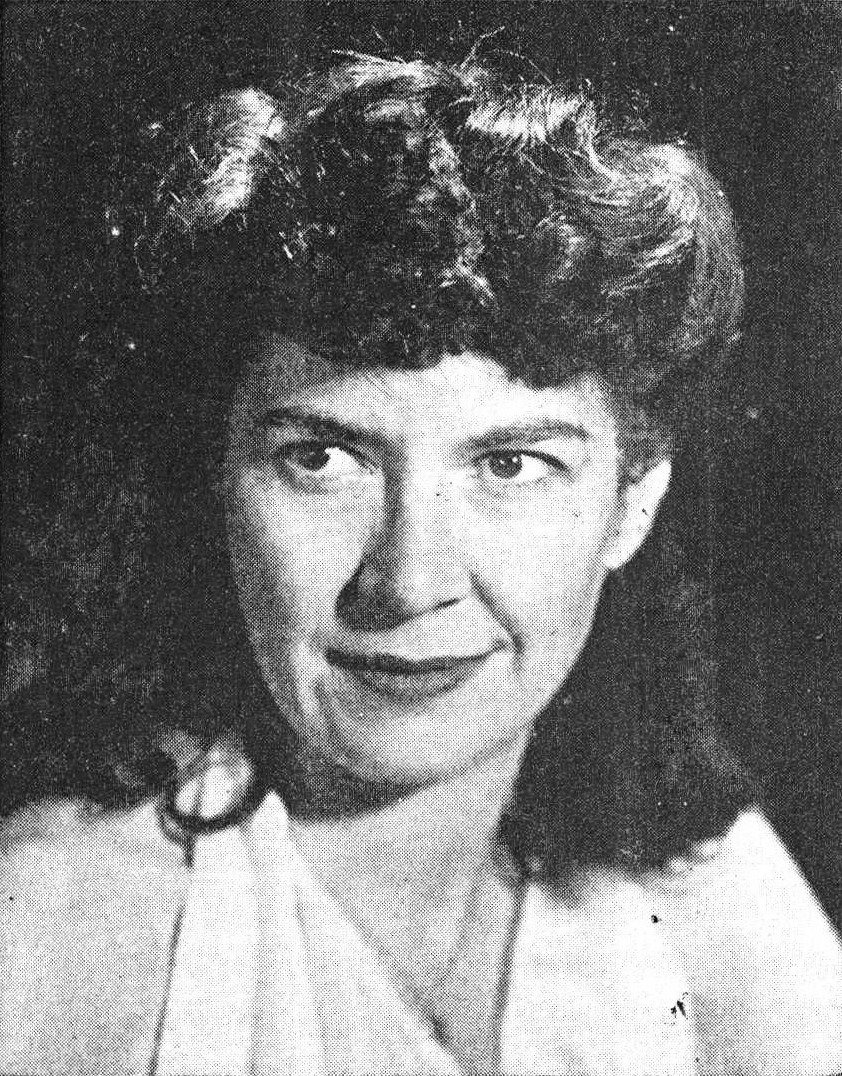
Margaret St. Clair c. 1946

Margaret St. Clair (17 February 1911 – 22 November 1995) was an American fantasy and science fiction writer, who also wrote under the pseudonyms Idris Seabright and (on one occasion) Wilton Hazzard.

== Biography ==
St. Clair was born as Eva Margaret Neeley in Hutchinson, Kansas. Her father, US Representative George A. Neeley, died when Margaret was seven, but left her mother well provided for. With no siblings, Margaret recalled her childhood as "rather a lonely and bookish one." She became a regular reader of Weird Tales at age twelve.

When she was seventeen, she and her mother moved to California. In 1932, after graduating from the University of California, Berkeley, she married writer Eric St. Clair. In 1934 she earned a Master of Arts in Greek Classics.

A letter to the editor published in the June 1934 issue of Weird Tales provides insight into her tastes as a reader:

The prospect of another story by Edmond Hamilton moves me to hysterical outcry...His style is nothing but exclamation marks; his idea of drama is something involving a fantastic number of light-speeds...He is science-fiction at its worst...Things like "Shambleau" [by C.L. Moore] are what I like. As long as WT prints stories by Clark Ashton Smith, I'll keep on reading it. His tales have a rounded jewel-like self-containedness that is, artistically, a delight...And Smith's drawings are, I think, by far the best in the magazine...In conclusion, Jules de Grandin is a pain in the neck.

After a visit to China, the St. Clairs lived in a hilltop house with a panoramic view in what is now El Sobrante, California, where Margaret gardened; she also bred and sold dachshund puppies.

In her rare autobiographical writings, St. Clair revealed few details of her personal life, but interviews with some who knew her indicate that she and her husband were well-traveled (including some visits to nudist colonies), were childless by choice, and in 1966 were initiated into Wicca by Raymond Buckland, taking the craft names Froniga and Weyland. Eric St. Clair worked variously as a statistician, social worker, horticulturist, shopfitter, and a laboratory assistant in the University of California at Berkeley Physics Department; he also published numerous short stories and magazine articles and was "perhaps the leading American writer of children's stories about bears, having sold close to 100 of them."

The St. Clairs eventually moved from El Sobrante to a house on the coast near Point Arena, "where every window had an ocean view." Margaret survived her husband by several years. A lifelong supporter of the American Friends Service Committee, she spent her final years at Friends House in Santa Rosa, California. She died in 1995.

== Short stories ==
Beginning in the late 1940s, St. Clair wrote and published, by her own count, some 130 short stories.

St. Clair wrote that she "first tried [her] hand at detective and mystery stories, and even the so-called 'quality' stories", before finding her niche writing fantasy and science fiction for pulp magazines. "Unlike most pulp writers, I have no special ambitions to make the pages of the slick magazines. I feel that the pulps at their best touch a genuine folk tradition and have a balladic quality which the slicks lack."

Her first published science fiction story, "Rocket to Limbo," appeared in the November 1946 issue of Fantastic Adventures. Editor Raymond A. Palmer read it in the slush pile and bought it at once. In an essay composed to introduce the tale, St. Clair wrote, "it seems to me that a story about people—their problems, emotions, triumphs, and failures, is a far more interesting story to read—and write [than fiction about the 'battle between worlds']...I like to write about ordinary people of the future, surrounded by gadgetry of super-science, but who, I feel sure, know no more about how the machinery works than a present-day motorist knows of the laws of thermodynamics."

Her early output included the Oona and Jick series of eight stories published from 1947 to 1949, chronicling the comic misadventures of "housewife of the future" Oona and her devoted husband Jick. The stories were ostensibly set in an idealized future but cast a satirical look at post-war domestic life, with its focus on acquiring labor-saving household devices and "keeping up with the Joneses." St. Clair would later remark that the Oona and Jick stories "were not especially popular with fans, who were—then as now—a rather humorless bunch. The light tone of the stories seemed to offend readers and make them think I was making fun of them."

"The Gardener" (Thrilling Wonder Stories, 1949) was the first of her horror stories; with its condemnation of careless tree-felling, Ramsey Campbell calls it "a seminal example of ecological science fiction."

She was especially prolific in the 1950s, producing such acclaimed and much-reprinted stories as "The Man Who Sold Rope to the Gnoles" (1951), "Brightness Falls from the Air" (1951), "An Egg a Month from All Over" (1952), and "Horrer Howce" (1956).

She occasionally drew inspiration from her education in Classics and her knowledge of mythology, as in "The Gardener" (1949), which draws on the ancient Roman religious belief in a genius loci, an arboreal guardian that draws power from its grove; "Mrs. Hawk" (1950), a modern update of the Circe myth; "The Bird" (1951), about a modern man's fateful encounter with the mythical phoenix; "The Causes" (1952), "a tall tale involving Greek gods, not entirely unreminiscent of Thorne Smith's comic novels along those lines"; "The Goddess on the Street Corner" (1953), in which a down-on-his-luck wino meets an equally vulnerable Aphrodite; and "Crescendo" (1955), which finds a magazine editor at odds with his next-door neighbor, who happens to be a goddess.

Beginning in 1950 with "The Listening Child," all of St. Clair's stories in The Magazine of Fantasy and Science Fiction appeared under the pseudonym Idris Seabright. The Seabright story "Personal Monster" appeared in the September 1955 issue immediately before the story "Too Many Bears" by a newcomer to the magazine, St. Clair's husband, Eric; in his introductory note to "Too Many Bears", editor Anthony Boucher quipped that Eric St. Clair "is enviably married to two of my favorite science fiction writers."

Three of her short stories were adapted for television. "Mrs. Hawk" was filmed as "The Remarkable Mrs. Hawk" for the 1961 season of Thriller, with Jo Van Fleet in the title role. "The Boy Who Predicted Earthquakes" (1950) and "Brenda" (1954) were filmed as segments of the 1971 season of Rod Serling's Night Gallery.

St. Clair wrote only a handful of stories in the mystery genre, but one of them, The Perfectionist (1946), was widely reprinted and translated, and served as the basis for the play A Dash of Bitters by Reginald Denham and Conrad Sutton Smith. She also wrote several pieces of fiction and satire for "gentlemen's magazines" including Gent and The Dude.

== Novels ==
St. Clair also wrote eight novels, four of which were published in the Ace Double series: The Green Queen (1956), Agent of the Unknown (1956), The Games of Neith (1960), and Message from the Eocene (1964).

Sign of the Labrys (1963), set in a vast underground shelter after the world has been depopulated by plagues, featured an overt early use of Wicca elements in fiction; St. Clair wrote that the book "was primarily inspired by Gerald Gardner's books on witchcraft." The influence of mythic concepts popularized by Robert Graves in his books The White Goddess (1948) and Seven Days in New Crete (1949) may also be seen in the novel. The editor of The Crystal Well called Sign of the Labrys "an occult classic," and in his review of the novel for Analog, P. Schuyler Miller declared that St. Clair was one of the most unappreciated writers in science fiction. St. Clair's research into witchcraft led to her friendship with Raymond Buckland, who recalled the St. Clairs as "absolutely wonderful people, very warm and loving."

St. Clair's last three novels comprise a loose trilogy, all having in common a near-future setting along the coast of Northern California, and elements of Wicca. In The Dolphins of Altair (1967), dolphins and three human compatriots stage a war on mankind by creating earthquakes and polar melting. In The Shadow People (1969), a young male narrator in Berkeley descends into a mysterious underworld to rescue his abducted girlfriend. The Dancers of Noyo (1973) draws on Pomo lore as a young male narrator in a California largely depopulated by plague goes on a "Grail Journey" along Highway 101. In these last two novels, the narrator's quest climaxes in an experience of transcendent enlightenment.

St. Clair left two novels uncompleted at her death.

== Legacy ==
From the outset of her career, St. Clair was aware of her role as a woman writing in a male-dominated field. An article she wrote for Writer's Digest in 1947, about selling stories to the science fiction market, begins: "Why is science fiction fun to write? At first blush, it doesn't seem attractive, particularly for a woman." When the World Science Fiction Convention was held in Oakland in 1954, the Oakland Tribune highlighted St. Clair as a local author by asking her to provide a "menu of the future." The back cover of her 1963 paperback novel Sign of the Labrys declared in large capital letters, "Women Are Writing Science-Fiction!" and continued: "Women are closer to the primitive than men. They are conscious of the moon-pulls, the earth-tides. They possess a buried memory of humankind's obscure and ancient past which can emerge to uniquely color and flavor a novel. Such a woman is Margaret St. Clair…."

St. Clair's pioneering role as a woman writing science fiction was noted by Eric Leif Davin in his book Partners in Wonder: Women and the Birth of Science Fiction, 1926-1965.

The Margaret St. Clair Papers are archived at the University of California, Riverside.

Ramsey Campbell has described St. Clair's work as "startlingly original" and argues it has "yet to be fully appreciated".

The Shadow People and Sign of the Labrys are referenced in Appendix N of the Advanced Dungeons & Dragons Dungeon Master's Guide as an influence on Gary Gygax.

== Works ==
=== Novels ===
- The Green Queen (1956)
- Agent of the Unknown (1956)
- The Games of Neith (1960)
- Sign of the Labrys (1963)
- Message from the Eocene (1964)
- The Dolphins of Altair (1967)
- The Shadow People (1969)
- The Dancers of Noyo (1973)

=== Story collections ===
- Three Worlds of Futurity (1964)
- Change the Sky and Other Stories (1974)
- The Best of Margaret St. Clair (1985)
- The Hole in the Moon and Other Tales (2019)
- A Compendium of Margaret St. Clair (2020)

=== Short stories (partial list) ===
- "The Perfectionist" (1946)
- "Rocket to Limbo" (1946)
- "Super Whost," an Oona and Jick story (1947)
- "The Boy Who Predicted Earthquakes" (1950)
- "Mrs. Hawk" (1950)
- "The Man Who Sold Rope to the Gnoles" (1951)
- "Brightness Falls from the Air" (1951)
- "The Bird" (1951)
- "An Egg a Month from All Over" (1952)
- "The Goddess on the Street Corner" (1953)
- "Brenda" (1954)
- "Personal Monster" (1955)
- "Horrer Howce" (1956)
- "Lochinvar" (Galaxy Science Fiction, August 1961)
- "An Old Fashioned Bird Christmas" (Galaxy, December 1961)
- "Roberta" (Galaxy, October 1962)
