= Joseph Jorkens =

Fictional character in short stories by Lord Dunsany

Joseph Jorkens (usually referred to simply as Jorkens) is the lead character in over 150 short stories written between 1925 and 1957 by the Irish author Lord Dunsany, noted for his fantasy short stories, fantastic plays, novels and other writings. The Jorkens stories, primarily fantasy but also including elements of adventure, mystery and science fiction literature, have been collected in a series of six books, and were a key inspiration for the "fantastic club tale" type of short story.

== Development ==
=== Origins ===
In the middle volume of his autobiographical trilogy, While the Sirens Slept, Dunsany notes the creation of Mr Jorkens, on the 29 and 30 March in 1925, when "I wrote a tale called The Tale of the Abu Laheeb. There was in this tale more description of the upper reaches of the White Nile or of the Bahr-el-Gazal than I have given here; indeed the whole setting of that fantastic story may be regarded as accurately true to life, though not the tale itself. I mention this short story and the date, because it was the first time that I told of the wanderings of a character that I called Jorkens. He was my reply to some earlier suggestion that I should write of my journeys after big game and, being still reluctant to do this, I had invented a drunken old man who, whenever he could cadge a drink at a club, told tales of his travels."

"The Tale of the Abu Laheeb", the first Jorkens story, was published in the July 1926 issue of The Atlantic Monthly, with illustrations.

=== Later development ===
Over the following 32 years, Dunsany continued to write of Mr. Jorkens, and the stories were popular and sold well, mostly initially to magazines (many enjoying wide circulation, from the Atlantic Monthly, Saturday Evening Post and Vanity Fair to the Pall Mall Gazette, The Strand and The Spectator) and newspapers (including The Daily Mail and The Irish Independent), and also in their collected book form. Some of the stories were read on radio, and they were popular enough that for at least one announcement of a new book, an introductory piece by Lord Dunsany was included in the publisher's house magazine.

A total of 154 stories are included in the Collected Jorkens edition. It has been rumoured at literary conventions that one or two further uncollected (or even unpublished) pieces may remain.

Some of the stories bear different titles in their periodical appearances than in the books (the book titles are apparently those Dunsany gave the stories, and he was strongly opposed to any changes to the stories or their titles), and were accompanied by sketches in both colour and black-and-white.

The Jorkens oeuvre contains the story which introduced the futuroscope, a device later the subject of a whole Dunsany novel, and one of the last short stories Dunsany wrote. The last two Jorkens stories were written in 1957, in February and August; the author died in October.

== Style and settings ==
The Jorkens stories are usually told in the "frame" of a gentlemen's club in London, to which the narrator is invited in the first story, and of which he becomes a member. In general, Jorkens is sitting, and his attention is caught by someone else trying to tell a story, whereupon he provides a better story, in return, before or after or both, for whiskey. The stories often contain a "sting", with Jorkens appearing to do something remarkable, or get rich, but missing out in the end, but in their lightness often also touch on bigger themes.

The stories take place in a wide range of settings, most often in the UK and Ireland and parts of Africa, as well as India, and are of varied character. Some of the early stories are notably lengthy, while most of the later are shorter, some just a few pages. A recurrent skeptical character, Terbut, often provokes their telling while the narrator (Dunsany himself) tends to be sympathetic.

=== Club tales ===
Dunsany's Jorkens stories, themselves in the tradition of such tall tales as those featuring Baron Munchausen, essentially established the genre of the fantastic tall club tale or bar tale. The "club tale" format itself was not new; at the time of Jorkens' first appearance in December 1926, P. G. Wodehouse had already published numerous stories about The Oldest Member and about Mr. Mulliner, both of whom would tell tall tales in a club or bar setting. However, the element of fantasy was a new wrinkle, and would inspire such disparate later descendants as L. Sprague de Camp and Fletcher Pratt's Tales from Gavagan's Bar, Arthur C. Clarke's Tales from the White Hart (specifically acknowledged by Clarke in his introduction to the first Jorkens omnibus volume) and Sterling E. Lanier's Brigadier Ffellowes stories, Larry Niven's Draco Tavern stories, Isaac Asimov's Black Widowers and Union Club mysteries, Spider Robinson's tales of Callahan's Place, and even the animated cartoon series "The World of Commander McBragg" and "Mater's Tall Tales".

Typically, the club tale features one particular raconteur notorious for his colourful history and unbelievable reminiscences, who relates memoirs of his life to initially incredulous fellow club members; by the end of the story the latter usually at least believe the unlikely tale, and count the experience well worth the expense. Major variations include a recurring cast of club members or bar regulars with the story-teller being an outsider, non-fantastic (but still interesting) tales, or settings that are themselves fantastic, rendering the tales themselves more believable within their fictional context. The format has proven endlessly adaptable, with notable instances to be found in the science fiction (Clarke and Robinson) and mystery (Asimov) genres as well as fantasy.

== Image ==
Jorkens was pictured a number of times, both in magazine and newspaper graphics as well as inside the collected volumes and on dust jackets; these depictions varying considerably. Among the more famous illustrations are those by Dunsany's favourite artist, Sidney Sime, which are, unusually for Sime, done in colour. The originals of these illustrations, which exist for at least the first three Jorkens stories, are still available to see at Dunsany Castle.

== Stories ==
The books of Jorkens stories are listed below, five published in the author's lifetime, and the sixth in 2002:

Original collections:

- The Travel Tales of Mr. Joseph Jorkens (1931)
- Jorkens Remembers Africa (1934)
- Jorkens Has a Large Whiskey (1940)
- The Fourth Book of Jorkens (1947)
- Jorkens Borrows Another Whiskey (1954)
- The Last Book of Jorkens (2002)

Omnibus collections, Volumes II and III of which each contain material not in the original collections:

- The Collected Jorkens, Volume One (2004)
- The Collected Jorkens, Volume Two (2004), with one previously uncollected story
- The Collected Jorkens, Volume Three (2005), with two previously uncollected stories, one of which was one of the last pieces written by the author
