= Verses Dedicatory =

Book of poetry by Lord Dunsany

Verses Dedicatory: 18 Previously Unpublished Poems
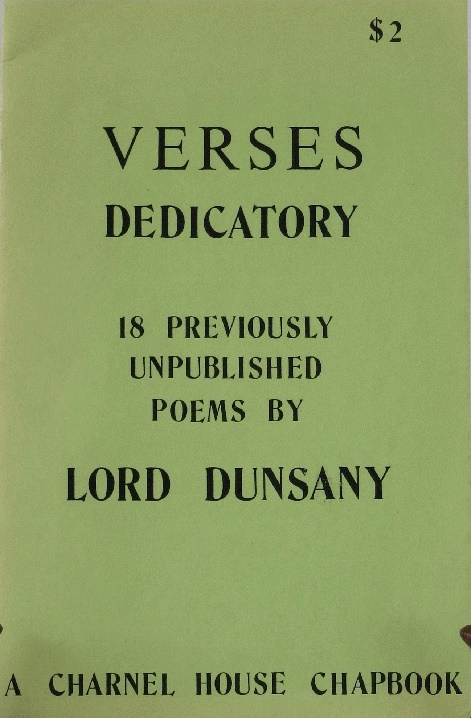
- Cover of Verses Dedicatory: 18 Previously Unpublished Poems
- Author: Lord Dunsany
- Language: English
- Series: Charnel House Chapbooks Series
- Genre: poetry
- Publisher: Charnel House
- Publication date: 1985
- Publication place: United States
- Media type: Print (Hardback)
- Pages: 12 p.

Verses Dedicatory: 18 Previously Unpublished Poems is a collection of poetry by fantasy author Lord Dunsany, edited by Lin Carter. It was first published in paperback as a chapbook by Charnel House as no. 2 in The Charnel House Chapbooks Series in 1985.

The book collects eighteen poems hand-written by the author on the flyleaves of copies of several of his published books. The copies in which the poems were found and from which they were taken are from the library of Hazel Littlefield. The titles assigned the poems are those of the books in which they appear. The collection includes an introduction by the editor.

== Contents ==
- "Introduction" (Lin Carter)
- "Wandering Songs"
- "The Story of Mona Sheehy"
- "Tales of Three Hemispheres"
- "Rory and Bran"
- "Don[n]ellan Lectures"
- "The King of Elfland's Daughter"
- "The Sirens Wake"
- "Jorkens Has a Large Whiskey"
- "The Blessings [sic] of Pan"
- "Plays for Earth and Air"
- "Don Rodriguez"
- "My Ireland"
- "Unhappy Far-Off Things"
- "My Talks with Dean Spanley"
- "Alexander and Three Small Plays"
- "The Curse of the Wise Woman"
- "To Awaken Pegasus"
- "The Book of Wonder"
