= Sterling E. Lanier =

American novelist

Sterling Edmund Lanier
- Born: December 18, 1927; New York City, New York
- Died: June 28, 2007 (aged 79); Sarasota, Florida
- Occupations: Editor; author; sculptor
- Writing career
- Pen name: Sterling Lanier, Sterling E. Lanier
- Genres: Science fiction, fantasy
- Notable work: Hiero's Journey

Sterling Edmund Lanier (December 18, 1927 – June 28, 2007) was an American editor, science fiction author and sculptor. He is perhaps known best as the editor who championed the publication of Frank Herbert’s bestselling novel Dune.

== Life ==
Lanier was born on December 18, 1927, in New York City to Priscilla Thorne Taylor and Berwick Bruce Lanier. He served in the US army during War II and the Korean War, and in 1951 graduated from Harvard with an undergraduate degree in English. Lanier also studied archaeology and anthropology at the University of Pennsylvania. He was a lifelong devotee of speculative fiction and a cryptozoology enthusiast. Before beginning his literary career, Lanier worked as a research historian at the Winterthur Museum from 1958 to 1960. He was a long time member of the Save Our Bays Association of Sarasota. Lanier died in Sarasota, Florida, at the age of 79.

== Literary career ==
Lanier's career as an author and editor began in 1961 when his first short story was published; he also became an editor for Chilton Books.

Lanier was with Chilton in 1965, when he was instrumental in persuading the firm to publish Frank Herbert’s Dune. Having read Dune World in Analog magazine, he was responsible for tracking down the author and conveying Chilton's offer. More than 20 other publishing companies had already turned the book down. Despite Lanier's insight into the book's value, he was dismissed from Chilton a year later because of high publication costs and poor initial book sales. Lanier also worked as an editor for the John C. Winston Company and McRae-Smith.

The most prominent of Lanier's writings are his stories of the crypto-adventurer Brigadier Donald Ffellowes (told in the "club story" style of Lord Dunsany's Jorkens tales) and the post-apocalyptic novels Hiero's Journey (1973) and The Unforsaken Hiero (1983). Hiero's Journey was cited in Appendix N by Gary Gygax as one of the works that influenced Dungeons and Dragons.

Lanier's short story "A Father's Tale" (1974) was a World Fantasy Award nominee.

== Sculpture ==
Lanier's sculptures have been exhibited at several museums, including the Smithsonian Institution. He specialized in miniatures, among which were a series featuring characters from J. R. R. Tolkien’s The Lord of the Rings. One set was given to Tolkien himself, with whom Lanier corresponded. Lanier produced at least two other sets. Tolkien encouraged Lanier to market the figures; for unknown reasons, however, Lanier did not pursue this.

== Bibliography ==
=== Hiero Desteen ===
- Hiero's Journey (Chilton, 1973)
- The Unforsaken Hiero (1983)
- Hiero's Answer (2026)

=== Brigadier Ffellowes ===
- The Peculiar Exploits of Brigadier Ffellowes (1971) [collection: contents as TPEOBF below]
- The Curious Quests of Brigadier Ffellowes (1986) [collection: contents as TCQOBF below; 1 original]

=== Novels ===
- The War for the Lot (1969)
- Menace Under Marswood (1983)

=== Short stories ===
- "Join Our Gang?" (1961)
- "Deathchild" (1968)
- "The Kings of the Sea" (1968) [TPEOBF]
- "Soldier Key" (1968) [TPEOBF]
- "Such Stuff as Dreams" (1968)
- "Whose Short Happy Life?" (1968)
- "A Feminine Jurisdiction" (1969) [TPEOBF]
- "Fraternity Brother" (1969) [TPEOBF]
- "The Leftovers" (1969) [TPEOBF]
- "His Coat So Gay" (1970) [TPEOBF]
- "His Only Safari" (1970) [TPEOBF]
- "Never Cry Human" (1970)
- "And the Voice of the Turtle" (1972) [TCQOBF]
- "Thinking of the Unthinkable" (1973) [TCQOBF]
- "A Father's Tale" (1974) [TCQOBF]
- "No Traveler Returns" (1974)
- "Ghost of a Crown" (1976) [TCQOBF]
- "The Syndicated Time" (1978)
- "Commander in the Mist" (1982) [TCQOBF]
- "The Brigadier in Check—and Mate" (1986) [TCQOBF; original]

== In popular culture ==
In the video game Elite: Dangerous, a Coriolis Starport in the Audheim system is named after Lanier; it bears the name Lanier Ring.
