= The Ginger Cat and Other Lost Plays =

Collection of works by Lord Dunsany

- Cover of first edition of The Ginger Cat and Other Lost Plays
- Author: Lord Dunsany; Darrell Schweitzer (editor)
- Language: English
- Genre: Fantasy plays
- Publisher: Wildside Press
- Publication date: 2005
- Publication place: United States
- Media type: Print (Hardback)
- Pages: 125 pp.
- ISBN: 0-8095-4478-4
- OCLC: 85853597

The Ginger Cat and Other Lost Plays is a collection of plays by Anglo-Irish fantasy writer Lord Dunsany, edited and with an introduction by Darrell Schweitzer. It was first published, in hardcover and paperback, by Wildside Press in 2005.

== Contents ==
The collection includes three of Dunsany's more obscure plays, only two of them previously acted and only one previously published. The contents in full are:

- "Introduction" (Darrell Schweitzer)
- "The Ginger Cat", a comedy, concerning a seeming fool who takes nothing but laughter seriously. This was in production in summer 1914, but was canceled at the outbreak of World War I.
- "The Murderers", a crime melodrama with a "twist" ending, had one known performance in 1919, at Yale University, during a visit by the playwright. It was never included in Dunsany's play collections, which were primarily of fantasies and comedies.
- "Mr. Faithful", another comedy, about the adventures of a man who must literally live a dog's life to marry the woman he has his heart set on. It was written in 1922, and performed on the BBC the same year; an acting edition published by Samuel French in 1935 is now a relative rarity.

"The Ginger Cat" was known to exist but lost for decades, and was rediscovered by Dunsany's literary curator, Joe Doyle, while "Mr. Faithful" was known in theatrical circles and remained in print in an acting edition for many years. Schweitzer reproduced the first two plays from Dunsany's manuscripts, and the third from a photocopy of the acting edition.

Schweitzer comments that "The Ginger Cat" and "Mr. Faithful" remain funny for modern audiences, and describes them as "between Wildean and Screwball comedy."
