= The Fourth Book of Jorkens =

Book by Lord Dunsany (1947)

- Dust-jacket for The Fourth Book of Jorkens by Lord Dunsany
- Author: Lord Dunsany
- Language: English
- Series: Jorkens
- Genre: Fantasy
- Publisher: Jarrolds
- Publication date: 1947
- Publication place: United Kingdom
- Media type: Print (hardback)
- Pages: 176 pp
- Preceded by: Jorkens Has a Large Whiskey
- Followed by: Jorkens Borrows Another Whiskey

The Fourth Book of Jorkens is a collection of fantasy short stories, narrated by Mr. Joseph Jorkens, by writer Lord Dunsany. It was first published by Jarrolds in 1947. It was the fourth collection of Dunsany's Jorkens tales to be published. It has also been issued in combination with the third book, Jorkens Has a Large Whiskey, and two uncollected short stories, in the omnibus edition The Collected Jorkens, Volume Two, published by Night Shade Books in 2004.

== Contents ==
The Fourth Book of Jorkens contains the following tales:

1. "Making Fine Weather"
2. "Mgamu"
3. "The Haunting of Jalahanstown"
4. "The Pale-Green Image"
5. "Jorkens Leaves Prison"
6. "The Warning"
7. "The Sacred City of Krakovlitz"
8. "Jorkens Practices Medicine and Magic"
9. "Jarton's Disease"
10. "On the Other Side of the Sun"
11. "The Rebuff"
12. "Jorkens' Ride"
13. "The Secret of the Sphinx"
14. "The Khamseen"
15. "The Expulsion"
16. "The Welcome"
17. "By Command of Pharaoh"
18. "A Cricket Problem"
19. "A Life's Work"
20. "The Ingratiating Smile"
21. "The Last Bull"
22. "The Strange Drug of Dr. Caber"
23. "A Deal with the Devil"
24. "Strategy at the Billiards Club"
25. "Jorkens in Witch Wood"
26. "Lost"
27. "The English Magnifico"
28. "The Cleverness of Dr. Caber"
29. "Fairy Gold"
30. "A Royal Dinner"
31. "A Fight With Knives"
32. "Out West"
33. "In a Dim Room"

== Reception ==
Fletcher Pratt, writing in The New York Times, described the collection as "Dunsany in twilight", saying that even in the least successful stories, "the execution is so smooth that one does not realize until after the punch line that there was not much of a story after all." Sam Moskowitz characterized the stories as "written by an older Dunsany who has ceased to dream, but whose imagination is keener and pen more adroit than ever before." Amazing Stories reviewer Morris Tish noted that while the stories were "written with the distinctive style that has made Dunsany famous in English literature", the cumulative effect was likely to be "a bit wearisome" for many readers.

== Reprints ==
- Sauk City, WI: Arkham House, 1948 (3,118 copies).
