= The Collected Jorkens =

Omnibus containing most of Lord Dunsany's Jorkens stories

- Volume One
- Author: Lord Dunsany
- Illustrator: Sidney Sime
- Genre: Fantasy fiction
- Publisher: Night Shade Books (US)
- Published: 2004-2005
- Media type: Short story collections

The Collected Jorkens is a 3-volume omnibus collection of 154 fantasy short stories by author Lord Dunsany and issued by Night Shade Books, then of Portland, Oregon.

== Jorkens ==
The Jorkens stories are "told" in the setting of a London gentleman's or adventurers' club of which the title character and the narrator are members, and usually open with another member mentioning an interesting experience he has had; this rouses Jorkens, who in return for a whisky-and-soda goes the other member one better with an extraordinary tall tale, supposedly from his own past. His stories often tip well over the boundaries of the plausible, into the realms of fantasy, horror, or even science fiction, and his auditors can never be quite sure what proportion of what he relates was truly experienced and to what degree he might have embellished.

== Contents ==
The first volume comprises The Travel Tales of Mr. Joseph Jorkens, first published in London by G. P. Putnam's Sons in April, 1931 (and then in the USA), and Jorkens Remembers Africa, first published in New York City by Longmans, Green & Co. in 1934 (and then in the UK). The second volume gathers the third and fourth books of Dunsany's Jorkens tales, with two previously uncollected pieces. The books, Jorkens Has a Large Whiskey and The Fourth Book of Jorkens, were originally published in 1940 and 1947 respectively (the latter's 1948 USA edition from Arkham House was for many years the only Jorkens volume widely available). The third volume gathers the fifth and sixth books of Dunsany's Jorkens tales, with three previously uncollected pieces, including the last Jorkens story written. The books, Jorkens Borrows Another Whiskey and The Last Book of Jorkens were originally published in 1954 and 2002 respectively (the latter, prepared for publication around 1957, and only discovered in 2001, was published in a limited edition, with an introduction explaining its origins - not reproduced in the omnibus volume). The fifth book brought one key story in which Jorkens is joined by his most frequent adversary, Terbut, while the sixth book contains two stories written as late as 1957 (February and August); the author died in October 1957.

The first volume was issued in a leatherette-bound hardback, with a stamped illustration (from Sidney Sime) and no dust jacket, in early 2004. It had originally been scheduled for release in 2003 with a dust jacket illustrated by Charles Vess but the publisher announced initially delays, and then a change to the format, due to the artist's heavy schedule. The second volume was also published in 2004, while the third was published in 2005.

=== Volume One ===
- Brief Foreword to the Complete Edition of Jorkens by the 20th Baron of Dunsany (in Table of Contents as Preface)
- Dunsany, Lord of Fantasy by Arthur C. Clarke
- Introduction by S.T. Joshi
- Bibliographical Notes
- Preface to The Travel Tales of Mr Joseph Jorkens
- Preface to Mr Jorkens Remembers Africa
1. "The Tale of the Abu Laheeb"
2. "The King of Sarahb"
3. "How Jembu Played for Cambridge"
4. "The Charm against Thirst"
5. "Our Distant Cousins"
6. "A Large Diamond"
7. "A Queer Island"
8. "The Electric King"
9. "A Drink at a Running Stream"
10. "A Daughter of Rameses"
11. "The Showman"
12. "Mrs. Jorkens"
13. "The Witch of the Willows"
14. "The Lost Romance"
15. "The Curse of the Witch"
16. "The Pearly Beach"
17. "The Walk to Lingham"
18. "The Escape from the Valley"
19. "One August in the Red Sea"
20. "The Bare Truth"
21. "What Jorkens Has to Put Up With"
22. "Ozymandias"
23. "At the End of the Universe"
24. "The Black Mamba"
25. "In the Garden of Memories"
26. "The Slugly Beast"
27. "Earth's Secret"
28. "The Persian Spell"
29. "Stranger Than Fiction"
30. "The Golden Gods"
31. "The Correct Kit"
32. "How Ryan Got out of Russia"
33. "The Club Secretary"
34. "A Mystery of the East"

=== Volume Two ===
- Brief Foreword to the Collected Edition of Jorkens (by the 20th Baron Dunsany)
- Preface by T.E.D. Klein
- Introduction by S.T. Joshi
- Bibliographical Note
- "Preface to Jorkens Has a Large Whiskey"
1. "Jorkens' Revenge"
2. "Jorkens Retires from Business"
3. "Jorkens Handles a Big Property"
4. "The Invention of Dr. Caber"
5. "The Grecian Singer"
6. "The Jorkens Family Emeralds"
7. "A Fishing Story"
8. "Jorkens in High Finance"
9. "The Sign"
10. "The Angelic Shepherd"
11. "The Neapolitan Ice"
12. "The Development of the Rillswood Estate"
13. "The Fancy Man"
14. "The Lion and the Unicorn"
15. "A Doubtful Story"
16. "Jorkens Looks Forward"
17. "Jorkens Among the Ghosts"
18. "Elephant Shooting"
19. "African Magic"
20. "Jorkens Consults a Prophet"
21. "A Matter of Business"
22. "The Invention of the Age"
23. "The Sultan, the Monkey, and the Banana"
24. "Pundleton's Audience"
25. "The Fight in the Drawing-Room"
26. "The Ivory Poacher"
27. "Making Fine Weather"
28. "Mgamu"
29. "The Haunting of Halahanstown"
30. "The Pale-Green Image"
31. "Jorkens Leaves Prison"
32. "The Warning"
33. "The Sacred City of Krakovlitz"
34. "Jorkens Practices Medicine and Magic"
35. "Jarton's Disease"
36. "On the Other Side of the Sun"
37. "The Rebuff"
38. "Jorkens' Ride"
39. "The Secret of the Sphinx"
40. "The Khamseen"
41. "The Expulsion"
42. "The Welcome"
43. "By Command of Pharaoh"
44. "A Cricket Problem"
45. "A Life's Work"
46. "The Ingratiating Smile"
47. "The Last Bull"
48. "The Strange Drug of Dr. Caber"
49. "A Deal with the Devil"
50. "Strategy at the Billiards Club"
51. "Jorkens in Witch Wood"
52. "Lost"
53. "The English Magnifico"
54. "The Cleverness of Dr. Caber"
55. "Fairy Gold"
56. "A Royal Dinner"
57. "A Fight With Knives"
58. "Out West"
59. "In a Dim Room"
60. "After Many a Summer"
61. "Jorkens' Problem"

=== Volume Three ===
- "Brief Foreword to the Collected Edition of Jorkens" (by the 20th Baron Dunsany)
- "Preface" by Michael Dirda
- "Introduction" by S.T. Joshi
- "Bibliographical Note"
- "Preface to Jorkens Borrows Another Whiskey"
1. "The Two-Way War"
2. "A Nice Lot of Diamonds"
3. "Letting Bygones be Bygones"
4. "The Lost Invention"
5. "On Other Paths"
6. "The Partner"
7. "Poulet a la Richelieu"
8. "A Walk in the Night"
9. "One Summer's Evening"
10. "A Friend of the Family"
11. "An Eccentricity of Genius"
12. "Influenza"
13. "The Unrecorded Test Match"
14. "Idle Tears"
15. "Among the Neutrals"
16. "An Idyll of the Sahara"
17. "The Devil among the Willows"
18. "A Spanish Castle"
19. "The New Moon"
20. "The Gods of Clay"
21. "A Rash Remark"
22. "The Story of Jorkens' Watch"
23. "The Track Through the Wood"
24. "Snow Water"
25. "The Greatest Invention"
26. "The Verdict"
27. "A Conversation in Bond Street"
28. "The Reward"
29. "Which Way?"
30. "A Desperado in Surrey"
31. "Misadventure"
32. "A Long Memory"
33. "An Absentminded Professor"
34. "Greek Meets Greek"
35. "A Fatal Mistake"
36. "A Prophet Without Honour"
37. "A Big Bang"
38. "Jorkens’ Regret"
39. "The Two Scientists"
40. "The Lost Charm"
41. "Bringing Things Up to Date"
42. "A Snake Story"
43. "The Deal"
44. "In the Mojave"
45. "A Modern Conqueror"
46. "The Little Light"
47. "Across the Colour Bar"
48. "A Bit of Counter-Espionage"
49. "A Wonderful Day"
50. "Not Guilty"
51. "The Explanation"
52. "A Deal with a Witch"
53. "Jorkens’ Dilemma"
54. "A Plaything of Our Betters"
55. "The Visitor"
56. "On Wings of Song"
57. "The Two Jenets"
58. "A Meeting of Spirits"
59. "The Ultimate Goal"
