= Jorkens Borrows Another Whiskey =

Book by Lord Dunsany (1954)

- Dust-jacket for Jorkens Borrows Another Whiskey by Lord Dunsany
- Author: Lord Dunsany
- Language: English
- Series: Jorkens
- Genre: Fantasy
- Publisher: Michael Joseph
- Publication date: 1954
- Publication place: United Kingdom
- Media type: Print (hardback)
- Preceded by: The Fourth Book of Jorkens
- Followed by: The Last Book of Jorkens

Jorkens Borrows Another Whiskey is a collection of fantasy short stories, narrated by Mr. Joseph Jorkens, by writer Lord Dunsany. It was first published in London by Michael Joseph in 1954. It was the fifth collection of Dunsany's Jorkens tales to be published. It has also been issued in combination with the sixth book, The Last Book of Jorkens, and three other short stories, in the omnibus edition The Collected Jorkens, Volume Three, published by Night Shade Books in 2005.

The book collects thirty-four short pieces by Dunsany, and in one key story, Jorkens is joined in the story by his most common adversary, Terbut.

== Contents ==
- "Preface"
1. "The Two-Way War"
2. "A Nice Lot of Diamonds"
3. "Letting Bygones be Bygones"
4. "The Lost Invention"
5. "On Other Paths"
6. "The Partner"
7. "Poulet a la Richelieu"
8. "A Walk in the Night"
9. "One Summer's Evening"
10. "A Friend of the Family"
11. "An Eccentricity of Genius"
12. "Influenza"
13. "The Unrecorded Test Match"
14. "Idle Tears"
15. "Among the Neutrals"
16. "An Idyll of the Sahara"
17. "The Devil among the Willows"
18. "A Spanish Castle"
19. "The New Moon"
20. "The Gods of Clay"
21. "A Rash Remark"
22. "The Story of Jorkens' Watch"
23. "The Track Through the Wood"
24. "Snow Water"
25. "The Greatest Invention"
26. "The Verdict"
27. "A Conversation in Bond Street"
28. "The Reward"
29. "Which Way?"
30. "A Desperado in Surrey"
31. "Misadventure"
32. "A Long Memory"
33. "An Absentminded Professor"
34. "Greek Meets Greek"
