= The Little Tales of Smethers and Other Stories =

Book by Lord Dunsany (1952)

- Dust-jacket from first edition
- Author: Lord Dunsany
- Language: English
- Genre: Fantasy, crime fiction
- Publisher: Jarrolds
- Publication date: 1952
- Publication place: United Kingdom
- Media type: Print (hardback)

The Little Tales of Smethers and Other Stories is a collection of fantasy and crime short stories by writer Lord Dunsany. It was first published in London by Jarrolds in October, 1952.

The book collects twenty-six short pieces by Dunsany, including all of his tales of the character Mr Smethers, one being the much-anthologised mystery story "The Two Bottles of Relish", with its neat and devastating one-sentence solution at the end. An audiobook of the collection was released in 2017.

== Contents ==
- "The Two Bottles of Relish"
- "The Shooting of Constable Slugger"
- "An Enemy of Scotland Yard"
- "The Second Front"
- "The Two Assassins"
- "Kriegblut's Disguise"
- "The Mug in the Gambling Hall"
- "The Clue"
- "Once Too Often"
- "An Alleged Murder"
- "The Waiter's Story"
- "A Trade Dispute"
- "The Pirate of the Round Pond"
- "A Victim of Bad Luck"
- "The New Master"
- "A New Murder"
- "A Tale of Revenge"
- "The Speech"
- "The Lost Scientist"
- "The Unwritten Thriller"
- "In Ravancore"
- "Among the Bean Rows"
- "The Death-Watch Beetle"
- "Murder by Lightning"
- "The Murder in Netherby Gardens"
- "The Shield of Athene"
