= The Last Book of Jorkens =

Posthumously published book by Lord Dunsany

- Sidney Sime illustration for an early Jorkens story, front of wrap cover to the Last Book of Jorkens
- Author: Lord Dunsany
- Cover artist: Sidney Sime
- Language: English
- Series: Jorkens
- Genre: fantasy
- Publisher: Night Shade Books
- Publication date: 2002
- Publication place: United States
- Media type: Print (hardback)
- Preceded by: Jorkens Borrows Another Whiskey

The Last Book of Jorkens is a collection of fantasy short stories concerning the character Joseph Jorkens created by writer Lord Dunsany. First prepared for publication in early 1957, it was left unpublished on Dunsany's death later that year, and lost in the family archives. Rediscovered in 2001, it was finally issued in a limited first special edition in 2002, and become widely available only on its inclusion (together with the preceding book, Jorkens Borrows Another Whiskey and three other short stories), in the omnibus edition The Collected Jorkens, Volume Three, issued by Night Shade Books in April 2005.

The collection has an introduction by the Dunsany curator, J.W. Doyle, who gives some background to the collection, which he discovered at Dunsany Castle in early 2001 (also in the 2000s finding an unpublished novel, poems and a few plays and other stories), and its existence seems to have been a surprise. The cover illustration is a full-bleed reproduction of a rare coloured Sidney Sime work, one of three on the walls of Dunsany Castle, which originally illustrated one of the early Jorkens stories.

While most early Jorkens was magazine-published, and then collected, many of the stories in this volume appear to have been for book publication only, and so had not been seen in any form, and were something new for Dunsany fans. Under special provisions in law for first-published material in some countries, such stories enjoy extended copyright protection (in the USA until 2047, for example, or 2052 in Russia and Canada).

The Last Book of Jorkens was the sixth and last collection of Dunsany's Jorkens tales to be published. Despite the title (agreed by the publishers and the literary estate, as the author had not agreed a title with the potential publishers in the 1950s, the collection being referenced in house records only as "Some Further Adventures"), it did not include all of his previously uncollected Jorkens stories, four having been omitted, mostly from the earlier collections, and one more written after this final collection was prepared for publication. These stories were finally brought together with the rest of the Jorkens tales in The Collected Jorkens; two of them in Volume Two, and the remaining three, including Dunsany's last Jorkens story, written within months of his death, in Volume Three.

The book collects twenty-two short pieces by Dunsany.

== Contents ==
- "Foreword" by J.W. Doyle
- "A Fatal Mistake"
- "A Prophet Without Honour"
- "A Big Bang"
- "Jorkens’ Regret"
- "The Two Scientists"
- "The Lost Charm"
- "Bringing Things Up to Date"
- "A Snake Story"
- "The Deal"
- "In the Mojave"
- "A Modern Conqueror"
- "The Little Light"
- "Across the Colour Bar"
- "A Bit of Counter-Espionage"
- "A Wonderful Day"
- "Not Guilty"
- "The Explanation"
- "A Deal with a Witch"
- "Jorkens’ Dilemma"
- "A Plaything of Our Betters"
- "The Visitor"
- "On Wings of Song"

== External sources ==
- Jorkens Compleat - review and contents lists of The Collected Jorkens by TexasBestGrok
- Trinity College, Dublin: Library Web Catalogue (Geoweb), checked 30 August 2007
