= The Boy Who Predicted Earthquakes =

Short story by Margaret St. Clair

- Author: Margaret St. Clair
- Language: English
- Genre: Horror Fiction
- Publication date: 15 June 1950

The Boy Who Predicted Earthquakes is a short story by American writer Margaret St. Clair. It was first published by Maclean's magazine and has been anthologized in both print and television. It is an example of horror fiction.

== Plot summary ==
Herbert Bittman is a fifteen-year-old boy with a youthful fascination with astronomy who has begun to enjoy psychic skills in the area of precognition. Television producers have put together a reality TV show in which Herbie is filmed speaking directly to the camera and making predictions about random events, such as earthquakes, that Herbie asserts will happen in the near future. As these predictions have invariably come true, Herbie and the television show have become wildly successful.

Despite this acclaim, one day Herbie refuses to allow himself to be photographed or broadcast. Without giving any reason, he flatly refuses to perform his usual role. After psychological pressure from the producers and a scientist, Read, Herbie is forced to give in. Despite this pressure and his initial refusal, when Herbie is broadcast making his weekly predictions of the near future, he astonishes his audience by predicting an immediate, and dramatic, paradigm shift of humanity from the familiar, ugly conditions of everyday life into worldwide utopia. Greed and hatred will disappear; and the resources wasted on competition, and worldwide preparations for war, will instead be spent for the plentiful enjoyment of all.

Herbie's broadcast generates a sensational global response, as his predictions are rebroadcast around the world and millions of viewers have become convinced that he can accurately read the future. Pursued by ecstatic fans, Herbie, accompanied by Read, is forced to take refuge in a skyscraper hotel located near the broadcasting studio. The rejoicing crowds cheer Herbie from far below; close to the top of the building, all he and Read can see are sun and sky.

In the story's climactic scene, Read asks Herbie why he had been extremely reluctant to issue his prediction for that week. The boy confesses that, although up until this point his precognitions had been accurate, this one would not be; he had deliberately lied to his television audience. With mounting dread, Read realizes that Herbie had, in fact, looked into the future of the coming days and seen something else, which he had not wanted to describe or share. Read demands to know what it is.

Herbie reports that he has seen a scene enacted in the near future which he could not understand until his childhood research in astronomy had explained it to him: he has learned about something called a nova. What he has really seen, and had not wanted to tell his audience, was that "tomorrow – the sun is going to explode."

== Adaptation ==
The Boy Who Predicted Earthquakes was originally published in the June 15, 1950 issue of Maclean's magazine. It was picked up by Rod Serling's NBC anthology series, Night Gallery; a teleplay based on the story was broadcast on September 15, 1971, as part of the second season premiere. It was directed by John Badham, and Herbie was played by Clint Howard.
