= The Draco Tavern =

2006 short story collection by Larry Niven

- First edition cover
- Author: Larry Niven
- Cover artist: Stephan Martinière
- Language: English
- Genre: Science fiction
- Published: November 28, 2006 (Tor Books)
- Publication place: United States
- Media type: Print
- ISBN: 978-0-7653-4771-8

The Draco Tavern is a 2006 collection of science fiction short stories by American writer Larry Niven concerning the activities of Rick Schumann, the bartender of the Draco Tavern.

== Fictional background story ==
The Draco tavern is located in Siberia, near the Mount Forel spaceport. The tavern was created after a race of sentient aliens called Chirpsithra landed on Earth.

The Chirpsithra stand 11 feet tall with salmon-pink exoskeletons. All of them appear to be female. They enjoy mild electric currents, whose effect on them is similar to that of alcohol on humans. They originated on tidally locked planets around red dwarf suns. Eventually, they had control over every single red dwarf sun in the galaxy, or so they claim. They enjoy the company of other sentient beings, and are extremely intelligent.

Units of currency used for Chirp-Human commerce are the "svith" and trade markers, mentioned in the story "Cruel and Unusual".

When they first put their mile-wide bubbleships into orbit around the Moon and landed in Siberia, they brought a host of aliens with a desire to eat, drink and socialize, thus the Draco Tavern was designed to cater to their individual, very diverse, and often conflicting interests.

Notable stories include "Limits", in which Schumann overhears some traders talking about humans' limited lifespan giving them a unique approach to mathematics, thus justifying withholding the secret of immortality, and "The Green Marauder", in which a very old Chirpsithra discusses working with an extinct Earth species from the early development of Earth's ecosystem before photosynthesis poisoned the atmosphere with oxygen.

== Publication information ==
Several of the Rick Schumann/Draco Tavern short stories which have appeared in other short story collections by Larry Niven were not reprinted in this book; there have also been further stories in the series since the publication of the book. The stories included in this anthology are mostly printed in the chronological order in which they were originally published.

== Contents ==
- "The Subject Is Closed"
- "Grammar Lesson"
- "Assimilating Our Culture, That's What They're Doing!"
- "The Schumann Computer"
- "The Green Marauder"
- "The Real Thing"
- "War Movie"
- "Limits"
- "Table Manners"
- "One Night at the Draco Tavern"
- "The Heights"
- "The Wisdom of Demons"
- "Smut Talk"
- "Ssoroghod's People"
- "The Missing Mass"
- "The Convergence of the Old Mind"
- "Chrysalis"
- "The Death Addict"
- "Storm Front"
- "The Slow Ones"
- "Cruel and Unusual"
- "The Ones Who Stay Home"
- "Breeding Maze"
- "Playhouse"
- "Lost"
- "Losing Mars"
- "Playground Earth"
