= World Fantasy Award—Collection =

Literary award for science fiction or fantasy collections in English

- Awarded for: The best collection of fantasy stories by a single author published in English in the prior calendar year
- Presented by: World Fantasy Convention
- First award: 1975
- Most recent winner: Thomas Ha (Uncertain Sons and Other Stories)
- Website: www.worldfantasy.org/awards/

The World Fantasy Awards are given each year by the World Fantasy Convention for the best fantasy fiction published in English during the previous calendar year. The awards have been described by book critics such as The Guardian as a "prestigious fantasy prize", and one of the three most prestigious speculative fiction awards, along with the Hugo and Nebula Awards (which cover both fantasy and science fiction). The World Fantasy Award—Collection is given each year for collections of fantasy stories by a single author published in English. A collection can have any number of editors, and works in the collection may have been previously published; awards are also given out for anthologies of works by multiple authors in the Anthology category. The Collection category has been awarded annually since 1975, though from 1977 through 1987 anthologies were admissible as nominees. Anthologies were split into a separate category beginning in 1988; during the 10 years they were admissible they won the award 7 times and were 38 of the 56 nominations.

World Fantasy Award nominees and winners are decided by attendees and judges at the annual World Fantasy Convention. A ballot is posted in June for attendees of the current and previous two conferences to determine two of the finalists, and a panel of five judges adds three or more nominees before voting on the overall winner. The panel of judges is typically made up of fantasy authors and is chosen each year by the World Fantasy Awards Administration, which has the power to break ties. The final results are presented at the World Fantasy Convention at the end of October. Winners were presented with a statue in the form of a bust of H. P. Lovecraft through the 2015 awards; more recent winners receive a statuette of a tree.

During the 52 nomination years, 183 writers have had works nominated; 51 of them have won, including ties, co-authors and translators. Only six writers or editors have won more than once. Jeffrey Ford has won the regular collection award three times out of six nominations, while Karen Joy Fowler, Lucius Shepard, and Gene Wolfe won the regular collection award twice, out of two, four, and two nominations, respectively. Charles L. Grant and Kirby McCauley won the award as editors of anthologies while those were eligible; Grant was nominated nine times as an editor and once for a collection, while McCauley won both times he was nominated for anthologies. Grant's ten nominations are the most of any writer or editor, followed by Ramsey Campbell, Harlan Ellison, Kelly Link, and Charles de Lint at five, with two of Campbell's nominations coming for anthologies. Link has had the most nominations without winning, followed by Peter S. Beagle, Dennis Etchison, Stephen King, Fritz Leiber, and Stuart David Schiff at four; one of Etchison's and all of Schiff's nominations were for anthologies.

== Winners and nominees ==
In the following table, the years correspond to the date of the ceremony, rather than when the collection was first published. Each year links to the corresponding "year in literature". Entries with a yellow background and an asterisk (*) next to the author's name have won the award; the other entries are the other nominees on the shortlist. If the work was an anthology rather than a collection, the editor's name is appended with (editor) to distinguish them from authors of collections.

* Winners

Winners and nominees
| Year | Author/editor | Collection/anthology | Publisher | Ref. |
|---|---|---|---|---|
| 1975 | Manly Wade Wellman* | Worse Things Waiting | Carcosa | |
| 1975 | Basil Copper | From Evil's Pillow | Arkham House | |
| 1976 | Avram Davidson* | The Enquiries of Doctor Eszterhazy | Warner | |
| 1976 | Harlan Ellison | Deathbird Stories | Harper & Row | |
| 1976 | Frank Belknap Long | The Early Long | Doubleday | |
| 1976 | E. Hoffmann Price | Far Lands, Other Days | Carcosa | |
| 1977 | Kirby McCauley* (editor) | Frights | St. Martin's Press | |
| 1977 | Edward Bryant | Cinnabar | Macmillan Publishers | |
| 1977 | Lin Carter (editor) | Flashing Swords! 3: Warriors and Wizards | Dell Publishing | |
| 1977 | Ramsey Campbell | The Height of the Scream | Arkham House | |
| 1977 | Ray Bradbury | Long After Midnight | Alfred A. Knopf | |
| 1977 | Ramsey Campbell (editor) | Superhorror | St. Martin's Press | |
| 1978 | Hugh B. Cave* | Murgunstrumm and Others | Carcosa | |
| 1978 | Robert Bloch | Cold Chills | Doubleday | |
| 1978 | Fritz Leiber | Swords and Ice Magic | Ace Books | |
| 1978 | Stuart David Schiff (editor) | Whispers | Doubleday | |
| 1978 | Gerald W. Page (editor) | The Year's Best Horror Stories V | DAW Books | |
| 1979 | Charles L. Grant* (editor) | Shadows | Doubleday | |
| 1979 | Fritz Leiber | Heroes and Horrors | Whispers Press | |
| 1979 | Stephen King | Night Shift | Doubleday | |
| 1979 | Karl Edward Wagner | Night Winds | Warner | |
| 1979 | Avram Davidson | The Redward Edward Papers | Doubleday | |
| 1979 | Gerald W. Page (editor) | The Year's Best Horror Stories VI | DAW Books | |
| 1980 | Jessica Amanda Salmonson* (editor) | Amazons! | DAW Books | |
| 1980 | Charles L. Grant (editor) | Nightmares | Playboy Press | |
| 1980 | Charles L. Grant (editor) | Shadows 2 | Doubleday | |
| 1980 | Robert Asprin (editor) | Thieves' World | Ace Books | |
| 1980 | Stuart David Schiff (editor) | Whispers II | Doubleday | |
| 1980 | Terry Carr (editor) | The Year's Finest Fantasy, Volume 2 | Berkley Books | |
| 1981 | Kirby McCauley* (editor) | Dark Forces | Viking Press | |
| 1981 | Orson Scott Card (editor) | Dragons of Light | Ace Books | |
| 1981 | Bill Pronzini (editor) | Mummy! A Chrestomathy of Crypt-ology | Arbor House | |
| 1981 | Ramsey Campbell (editor) | New Terrors | Pan Books | |
| 1981 | Charles L. Grant (editor) | Shadows 3 | Doubleday | |
| 1981 | Harlan Ellison | Shatterday | Houghton Mifflin Harcourt | |
| 1982 | Terri Windling* (editor) | Elsewhere | Ace Books | |
| 1982 | Mark Alan Arnold* (editor) | Elsewhere | Ace Books | |
| 1982 | Terry Carr (editor) | Fantasy Annual IV | Timescape | |
| 1982 | Charles L. Grant (editor) | Shadows 4 | Doubleday | |
| 1982 | Charles L. Grant | Tales from the Nightside | Arkham House | |
| 1982 | Stuart David Schiff (editor) | Whispers III | Doubleday | |
| 1983 | Charles L. Grant* (editor) | Nightmare Seasons | Doubleday | |
| 1983 | Dennis Etchison | The Dark Country | Scream/Press | |
| 1983 | Stephen King | Different Seasons | Viking Press | |
| 1983 | Susan Shwartz (editor) | Hecate's Cauldron | DAW Books | |
| 1983 | Alan Ryan (editor) | Perpetual Light | Warner | |
| 1983 | Charles L. Grant (editor) | Shadows 5 | Doubleday | |
| 1984 | Robertson Davies* | High Spirits | Penguin | |
| 1984 | Charles L. Grant (editor) | The Dodd, Mead Gallery of Horror | Dodd, Mead and Company | |
| 1984 | Tanith Lee | Red as Blood, or Tales from the Sisters Grimmer | DAW Books | |
| 1984 | Charles L. Grant (editor) | Shadows 6 | Doubleday | |
| 1984 | Jane Yolen | Tales of Wonder | Schocken Books | |
| 1985 | Clive Barker* | Books of Blood, Vols. I-III | Sphere Books | |
| 1985 | Parke Godwin | The Fire When It Comes | Doubleday | |
| 1985 | J. N. Williamson (editor) | Masques | Maclay & Associates | |
| 1985 | Alan Ryan (editor) | Night Visions 1 | Dark Harvest | |
| 1985 | Garry Kilworth | The Songbirds of Pain | Victor Gollancz | |
| 1985 | M. John Harrison | Viriconium Nights | Ace Books | |
| 1986 | Robin McKinley* (editor) | Imaginary Lands | Ace Books | |
| 1986 | Angela Carter | Black Venus | Hogarth Press | |
| 1986 | Clive Barker | Books of Blood, Vols. IV-VI | Sphere Books | |
| 1986 | Jane Yolen | Dragonfield and Other Stories | Ace Books | |
| 1986 | Terri Windling (editor) | Faery! | Ace Books | |
| 1986 | Charles L. Grant (editor) | Night Visions 2 | Dark Harvest | |
| 1986 | Stephen King | Skeleton Crew | Putnam Publishing Group | |
| 1986 | Stuart David Schiff (editor) | Whispers V | Doubleday | |
| 1987 | James Tiptree Jr.* | Tales of the Quintana Roo | Arkham House | |
| 1987 | Douglas E. Winter (editor) | Black Wine | Dark Harvest | |
| 1987 | Dennis Etchison (editor) | Cutting Edge | Doubleday | |
| 1987 | Tanith Lee | Dreams of Dark and Light | Arkham House | |
| 1987 | Emma Bull (editor) | Liavek: The Players of Luck | Ace Books | |
| 1987 | Will Shetterly (editor) | Liavek: The Players of Luck | Ace Books | |
| 1987 | Jane Yolen | Merlin's Booke | Ace Books | |
| 1987 | George R. R. Martin (editor) | Night Visions 3 | Dark Harvest | |
| 1988 | Lucius Shepard* | The Jaguar Hunter | Arkham House | |
| 1988 | Tanith Lee | Night's Sorceries | DAW Books | |
| 1988 | Michael Shea | Polyphemus | Arkham House | |
| 1988 | Ramsey Campbell | Scared Stiff: Tales of Sex and Death | Scream/Press | |
| 1988 | Karl Edward Wagner | Why Not You and I? | Tor Books | |
| 1989 | Harlan Ellison* | Angry Candy | Houghton Mifflin Harcourt | |
| 1989 | Gene Wolfe* | Storeys from the Old Hotel | Kerosina Books | |
| 1989 | Dennis Etchison | The Blood Kiss | Scream/Press | |
| 1989 | Clive Barker | Cabal | Poseidon Press | |
| 1989 | Charles Beaumont | Charles Beaumont: Selected Stories | Dark Harvest | |
| 1989 | Fritz Leiber | The Knight and Knave of Swords | William Morrow and Company | |
| 1990 | Richard Matheson* | Richard Matheson: Collected Stories | Scream/Press | |
| 1990 | Robert R. McCammon | Blue World and Other Stories | Grafton | |
| 1990 | Joe R. Lansdale | By Bizarre Hands | Mark V. Ziesing | |
| 1990 | Harlan Ellison | Harlan Ellison's Watching | Underwood–Miller | |
| 1990 | John Crowley | Novelty | Doubleday | |
| 1991 | Carol Emshwiller* | The Start of the End of It All and Other Stories | The Women's Press | |
| 1991 | Michael Blumlein | The Brains of Rats | Scream/Press | |
| 1991 | Peter Straub | Houses Without Doors | Grafton | |
| 1991 | Fritz Leiber | The Leiber Chronicles | Dark Harvest | |
| 1991 | Dan Simmons | Prayers to Broken Stones | Dark Harvest | |
| 1992 | Lucius Shepard* | The Ends of the Earth | Arkham House | |
| 1992 | Robert Holdstock | The Bone Forest | Grafton | |
| 1992 | Thomas Ligotti | Grimscribe: His Lives and Works | Carroll & Graf Publishers | |
| 1992 | R. A. Lafferty | Lafferty In Orbit | Broken Mirrors Press | |
| 1992 | Fred Chappell | More Shapes Than One | St. Martin's Press | |
| 1992 | Howard Waldrop | Night of the Cooters: More Neat Stories | Mark V. Ziesing | |
| 1993 | Jack Cady* | The Sons of Noah & Other Stories | Broken Moon Press | |
| 1993 | Greg Bear | Bear's Fantasies | Wildside Press | |
| 1993 | James Blaylock | Lord Kelvin's Machine | Arkham House | |
| 1993 | John Kessel | Meeting in Infinity | Arkham House | |
| 1993 | Norman Partridge | Mr. Fox and Other Feral Tales | Roadkill Press | |
| 1993 | Charles de Lint | Spiritwalk | Tor Books | |
| 1994 | Ramsey Campbell* | Alone with the Horrors | Arkham House | |
| 1994 | Neil Gaiman | Angels and Visitations | DreamHaven Books | |
| 1994 | John Crowley | Antiquities | Incunabula | |
| 1994 | Charles de Lint | Dreams Underfoot | Tor Books | |
| 1994 | Garry Kilworth | Hogfoot Right and Bird-hands | Edgewood Press | |
| 1994 | Darrell Schweitzer | Transients and Other Disquieting Stories | W. Paul Ganley | |
| 1994 | Terry Lamsley | Under the Crust | Wendigo | |
| 1995 | Bradley Denton* | The Calvin Coolidge Home for Dead Comedians and A Conflagration Artist | Wildside Press | |
| 1995 | Robert Bloch | The Early Fears | Fedogan & Bremer | |
| 1995 | Joel Lane | The Earth Wire & Other Stories | Egerton Press | |
| 1995 | Joyce Carol Oates | Haunted: Tales of the Grotesque | Dutton Penguin | |
| 1995 | Lisa Goldstein | Travellers In Magic | Tor Books | |
| 1996 | Gwyneth Jones* | Seven Tales and a Fable | Edgewood Press | |
| 1996 | Hugh B. Cave | Death Stalks the Night | Fedogan & Bremer | |
| 1996 | Charles de Lint | The Ivory and the Horn | Tor Books | |
| 1996 | Jonathan Carroll | The Panic Hand | HarperCollins UK | |
| 1996 | Brian W. Aldiss | The Secret of This Book | HarperCollins UK | |
| 1997 | Jonathan Lethem* | The Wall of the Sky, the Wall of the Eye | Harcourt Brace | |
| 1997 | Norman Partridge | Bad Intentions | Subterranean Press | |
| 1997 | James K. Morrow | Bible Stories for Adults | Harcourt Brace | |
| 1997 | Terry Lamsley | Conference with the Dead | Ash-Tree Press | |
| 1997 | Richard Chizmar | Midnight Promises | Gauntlet Publications | |
| 1997 | Thomas Ligotti | The Nightmare Factory | Carroll & Graf Publishers | |
| 1997 | S. P. Somtow | The Pavilion of Frozen Women | Victor Gollancz | |
| 1998 | Brian McNaughton* | The Throne of Bones | Terminal Fright Press | |
| 1998 | Ray Bradbury | Driving Blind | Avon Publications | |
| 1998 | Paul Di Filippo | Fractal Paisleys | Four Walls Eight Windows | |
| 1998 | Michael Swanwick | A Geography of Unknown Lands | Tigereyes Press | |
| 1998 | Peter S. Beagle | Giant Bones | Roc Books | |
| 1999 | Karen Joy Fowler* | Black Glass | Henry Holt and Company | |
| 1999 | Gahan Wilson | The Cleft and Other Odd Tales | Tor Books | |
| 1999 | Elizabeth Hand | Last Summer at Mars Hill | HarperPrism | |
| 1999 | Graham Masterton | Manitou Man: The Worlds of Graham Masterton | British Fantasy Society | |
| 1999 | Jack Cady | The Night We Buried Road Dog | DreamHaven Books | |
| 2000 | Charles de Lint* | Moonlight and Vines | Tor Books | |
| 2000 | Stephen R. Donaldson* | Reave the Just and Other Tales | HarperCollins Voyager | |
| 2000 | Thomas Piccirilli | Deep Into That Darkness Peering | Terminal Fright Press | |
| 2000 | Stephen King | Hearts in Atlantis | Charles Scribner's Sons | |
| 2000 | Darrell Schweitzer | Necromancies and Netherworlds: Uncanny Stories | Wildside Press | |
| 2001 | Andy Duncan* | Beluthahatchie and Other Stories | Golden Gryphon Press | |
| 2001 | Terry Dowling | Blackwater Days | Eidolon Publications | |
| 2001 | Peter Straub | Magic Terror: Seven Tales | Random House | |
| 2001 | Neal Barrett, Jr. | Perpetuity Blues and Other Stories | Golden Gryphon Press | |
| 2001 | Robert Charles Wilson | The Perseids and Other Stories | Tor Books | |
| 2001 | M. John Harrison | Travel Arrangements | Victor Gollancz | |
| 2002 | Nalo Hopkinson* | Skin Folk | Warner Aspect | |
| 2002 | William F. Nolan | Dark Universe: Stories 1951-2001 | Stealth Press | |
| 2002 | Harlan Ellison | The Essential Ellison: A 50-Year Retrospective: Revised and Expanded | Morpheus International | |
| 2002 | Kelly Link | Stranger Things Happen | Small Beer Press | |
| 2002 | Dennis Etchison | Talking in the Dark | Stealth Press | |
| 2003 | Jeffrey Ford* | The Fantasy Writer's Assistant and Other Stories | Golden Gryphon Press | |
| 2003 | Jeff VanderMeer | City of Saints and Madmen | Prime Books | |
| 2003 | Chet Williamson | Figures in Rain | Ash-Tree Press | |
| 2003 | Richard Parks | The Ogre's Wife: Fairy Tales for Grownups | Obscura Press | |
| 2003 | Charles de Lint | Waifs and Strays | Viking Press | |
| 2003 | Robin McKinley | Water: Tales of Elemental Spirits | Putnam Publishing Group | |
| 2003 | Peter Dickinson | Water: Tales of Elemental Spirits | Putnam Publishing Group | |
| 2004 | Elizabeth Hand* | Bibliomancy | PS Publishing | |
| 2004 | Jack Cady | Ghosts of Yesterday | Night Shade Books | |
| 2004 | George R. R. Martin | GRRM: A RRetrospective | Subterranean Press | |
| 2004 | Michael Marshall Smith | More Tomorrow & Other Stories | Earthling Publications | |
| 2004 | Glen Hirshberg | The Two Sams: Ghost Stories | Carroll & Graf Publishers | |
| 2005 | Margo Lanagan* | Black Juice | Allen & Unwin Australia | |
| 2005 | Ian R. MacLeod | Breathmoss and Other Exhalations | Golden Gryphon Press | |
| 2005 | John M. Ford | Heat of Fusion and Other Stories | Tor Books | |
| 2005 | Joe R. Lansdale | Mad Dog Summer and Other Stories | Subterranean Press | |
| 2005 | Peter Crowther | Songs of Leaving | Subterranean Press | |
| 2005 | Eileen Gunn | Stable Strategies and Others | Tachyon Publications | |
| 2005 | Lucius Shepard | Trujillo and Other Stories | PS Publishing | |
| 2006 | Bruce Holland Rogers* | The Keyhole Opera | Wheatland Press | |
| 2006 | Joe Hill | 20th Century Ghosts | PS Publishing | |
| 2006 | Holly Phillips | In the Palace of Repose | Prime Books | |
| 2006 | Kelly Link | Magic for Beginners | Small Beer Press | |
| 2006 | Caitlín R. Kiernan | To Charles Fort, with Love | Subterranean Press | |
| 2007 | M. Rickert* | Map of Dreams | Golden Gryphon Press | |
| 2007 | Glen Hirshberg | American Morons | Earthling Publications | |
| 2007 | Jeffrey Ford | The Empire of Ice Cream | Golden Gryphon Press | |
| 2007 | Susanna Clarke | The Ladies of Grace Adieu and Other Stories | Bloomsbury | |
| 2007 | Margo Lanagan | Red Spikes | Allen & Unwin Australia | |
| 2008 | Robert Shearman* | Tiny Deaths | Comma Press | |
| 2008 | Lucius Shepard | Dagger Key and Other Stories | PS Publishing | |
| 2008 | Tim Pratt | Hart & Boot & Other Stories | Night Shade Books | |
| 2008 | Stephen Gallagher | Plots and Misadventures | Subterranean Press | |
| 2008 | Ellen Klages | Portable Childhoods | Tachyon Publications | |
| 2008 | Kim Newman | The Secret Files of the Diogenes Club | MonkeyBrain Books | |
| 2009 | Jeffrey Ford* | The Drowned Life | Harper Perennial | |
| 2009 | Nisi Shawl | Filter House | Aqueduct Press | |
| 2009 | Kelly Link | Pretty Monsters | Viking Press | |
| 2009 | Peter S. Beagle | Strange Roads | DreamHaven Books | |
| 2009 | Shaun Tan | Tales from Outer Suburbia | Allen & Unwin | |
| 2010 | Lyudmila Petrushevskaya* | There Once Lived a Woman Who Tried to Kill Her Neighbor's Baby: Scary Fairy Tales | Penguin | |
| 2010 | Gene Wolfe* | The Best of Gene Wolfe | PS Publishing | |
| 2010 | Paul Witcover | Everland and Other Stories | PS Publishing | |
| 2010 | Brian Evenson | Fugue State | Coffee House Press | |
| 2010 | Barbara Roden | Northwest Passages | Prime Books | |
| 2010 | Peter S. Beagle | We Never Talk About My Brother | Tachyon Publications | |
| 2011 | Karen Joy Fowler* | What I Didn't See and Other Stories | Small Beer Press | |
| 2011 | Caitlín R. Kiernan | The Ammonite Violin & Others | Subterranean Press | |
| 2011 | M. Rickert | Holiday | Golden Gryphon Press | |
| 2011 | Angela Slatter | Sourdough and Other Stories | Tartarus Press | |
| 2011 | Jeff VanderMeer | The Third Bear | Tachyon Publications | |
| 2012 | Tim Powers* | The Bible Repairman and Other Stories | Tachyon Publications | |
| 2012 | Lisa L. Hannett | Bluegrass Symphony | Ticonderoga Publications | |
| 2012 | Caitlín R. Kiernan | Two Worlds and In Between | Subterranean Press | |
| 2012 | Maureen F. McHugh | After the Apocalypse | Small Beer Press | |
| 2012 | Reggie Oliver | Mrs Midnight and Other Stories | Tartarus Press | |
| 2013 | Joel Lane* | Where Furnaces Burn | PS Publishing | |
| 2013 | Kij Johnson | At the Mouth of the River of Bees | Small Beer Press | |
| 2013 | Ursula K. Le Guin | The Unreal and the Real: Selected Stories Volume One: Where on Earth and Volume Two: Outer Space, Inner Lands | Small Beer Press | |
| 2013 | Robert Shearman | Remember Why You Fear Me | ChiZine Publications | |
| 2013 | Karin Tidbeck | Jagannath | Cheeky Frawg Books | |
| 2014 | Caitlín R. Kiernan* | The Ape's Wife and Other Stories | Subterranean Press | |
| 2014 | Nathan Ballingrud | North American Lake Monsters: Stories | Small Beer Press | |
| 2014 | Laird Barron | The Beautiful Thing That Awaits Us All and Other Stories | Night Shade Books | |
| 2014 | Reggie Oliver | Flowers of the Sea | Tartarus Press | |
| 2014 | Rachel Swirsky | How the World Became Quiet: Myths of the Past, Present, and Future | Subterranean Press | |
| 2015 | Angela Slatter* | The Bitterwood Bible and Other Recountings | Tartarus Press | |
| 2015 | Helen Marshall* | Gifts for the One Who Comes After | ChiZine Publications | |
| 2015 | Rebecca Lloyd | Mercy and Other Stories | Tartarus Press | |
| 2015 | Robert Shearman | They Do the Same Things Different There | ChiZine Publications | |
| 2015 | Janeen Webb | Death at the Blue Elephant | Ticonderoga Publications | |
| 2016 | C. S. E. Cooney* | Bone Swans | Mythic Delirium | |
| 2016 | Kelly Link | Get in Trouble | Random House | |
| 2016 | Leena Krohn | Leena Krohn: The Collected Fiction | Cheeky Frawg Books | |
| 2016 | James K. Morrow | Reality by Other Means: The Best Short Fiction of James Morrow | Wesleyan University Press | |
| 2016 | V. H. Leslie | Skein and Bone | Undertow Publications | |
| 2016 | M. Rickert | You Have Never Been Here | Small Beer Press | |
| 2017 | Jeffrey Ford* | A Natural History of Hell | Small Beer Press | |
| 2017 | Tina Connolly | On the Eyeball Floor and Other Stories | Fairwood Press | |
| 2017 | Ken Liu | The Paper Menagerie and Other Stories | Saga Press | |
| 2017 | Joe Abercrombie | Sharp Ends | Orbit Books | |
| 2017 | L. S. Johnson | Vacui Magia | Traversing Z Press | |
| 2018 | Jane Yolen* | The Emerald Circus | Tachyon Publications | |
| 2018 | Ellen Klages | Wicked Wonders | Tachyon Publications | |
| 2018 | Carmen Maria Machado | Her Body and Other Parties | Graywolf Press | |
| 2018 | Tim Powers | Down and Out in Purgatory: The Collected Stories of Tim Powers | Baen Books | |
| 2018 | Sofia Samatar | Tender | Small Beer Press | |
| 2019 | Paolo Bacigalupi* | The Tangled Lands | Saga Press | |
| 2019 | Tobias S. Buckell* | The Tangled Lands | Saga Press | |
| 2019 | Andy Duncan | An Agent of Utopia | Small Beer Press | |
| 2019 | N. K. Jemisin | How Long 'til Black Future Month? | Orbit Books | |
| 2019 | Margo Lanagan | Phantom Limbs | PS Publishing | |
| 2019 | Amanda Downum | Still So Strange | ChiZine Publications | |
| 2020 | Brian Evenson* | Song for the Unraveling of the World | Coffee House Press | |
| 2020 | Nino Cipri | Homesick | Dzanc Books | |
| 2020 | John Hornor Jacobs | A Lush and Seething Hell | Harper Voyager | |
| 2020 | Sarah Pinsker | Sooner or Later Everything Falls into the Sea | Small Beer Press | |
| 2020 | Molly Gloss | Unforeseen | Saga Press | |
| 2021 | Aoko Matsuda* | Where the Wild Ladies Are | Soft Skull Press | |
| 2021 | Jeffrey Ford | The Best of Jeffrey Ford | PS Publishing | |
| 2021 | Sheree Renée Thomas | Nine Bar Blues | Third Man Books | |
| 2021 | Kathe Koja | Velocities: Stories | Meerkat Press | |
| 2021 | Robert Shearman | We All Hear Stories in the Dark | PS Publishing | |
| 2022 | Usman T. Malik* | Midnight Doorways: Fables from Pakistan | Kitab Press | |
| 2022 | Jeffrey Ford | Big Dark Hole | Small Beer Press | |
| 2022 | A. C. Wise | The Ghost Sequences | Undertow Publications | |
| 2022 | Isabel Yap | Never Have I Ever | Small Beer Press | |
| 2022 | Jen Fawkes | Tales the Devil Told Me | Press 53 | |
| 2022 | Angela Slatter | The Tallow-Wife and Other Tales | Tartarus Press | |
| 2023 | Tim Lebbon* | All Nightmare Long | PS Publishing | |
| 2023 | Sam J. Miller | Boys, Beasts & Men | Tachyon Publications | |
| 2023 | Cassandra Khaw | Breakable Things | Undertow Publications | |
| 2023 | C. S. E. Cooney | Dark Breakers | Mythic Delirium | |
| 2023 | Luigi Musolino | A Different Darkness and Other Abominations | Valancourt Books | |
| 2024 | Premee Mohamed* | No One Will Come Back for Us and Other Stories | Undertow Publications | |
| 2024 | Peter S. Beagle | The Essential Peter S. Beagle, Volumes 1 & 2 | Tachyon Publications | |
| 2024 | Lisa L. Hannett | The Fortunate Isles | Egaeus Press | |
| 2024 | Tobi Ogundiran | Jackal, Jackal | Undertow Publications | |
| 2024 | E. Lily Yu | Jewel Box | Erewhon Books | |
| 2024 | Kelly Link | White Cat, Black Dog | Random House/Ad Astra | |
| 2025 | Mariana Enríquez* | A Sunny Place for Shady People | Hogarth US/Granta | |
| 2025 | Megan McDowell (translator)* | A Sunny Place for Shady People | Hogarth US/Granta | |
| 2025 | Pemi Aguda | Ghostroots | W. W. Norton & Company/Virago Press | |
| 2025 | Brian Evenson | Good Night, Sleep Tight | Coffee House Press | |
| 2025 | Kathleen Jennings | Kindling: Stories | Small Beer Press | |
| 2025 | Ananda Lima | Craft: Stories I Wrote for the Devil | Tor Books | |
| 2026 (Note: The Essential Patricia A. McKillip was initially nominated for the 2026 award, but was withdrawn after the nominees were announced as the WFC rules do not allow for posthumous nominations.) | Thomas Ha* | Uncertain Sons and Other Stories | Undertow Publications | |
| 2026 | Theodora Goss | Letters from an Imaginary Country | Tachyon | |
| 2026 | Salman Rushdie | The Eleventh Hour: A Quintet of Stories | Random House; Jonathan Cape | |
| 2026 | K.A. Teryna | Black Hole Heart and Other Stories | Fairwood | |
| 2026 | Alex Shvartsman (translator) | Black Hole Heart and Other Stories | Fairwood | |
