= Sticks (short story) =

Short story by Karl Edward Wagner

"Sticks" is a short story by horror fiction writer Karl Edward Wagner, first published in the March 1974 issue of Whispers. It has been reprinted in several anthologies, including the revised edition of Tales of the Cthulhu Mythos, making it a retroactive part of the Cthulhu Mythos.

== Premise ==
On a fishing trip in North Pitcher, NY, horror illustrator Colin Leverett encounters an old abandoned house surrounded by bizarre stick formations. Sketching the strange constructions, he enters the house and is attacked by a lich in the basement, from whom he narrowly escapes. Many years later, Leverett is contacted by a descendant of a famous horror author, H. Kenneth Allard (supposedly based on H. P. Lovecraft), who hires him to illustrate a volume of Allard's previously unpublished stories. When Leverett decides to base the illustrations on his old sketches of the stick lattices, he is drawn into a supernatural conspiracy.

== Origins ==
The mysterious lattices of twigs were inspired by the work of Weird Tales artist Lee Brown Coye, who illustrated two Carcosa Press volumes which Wagner edited: Manly Wade Wellman's Worse Things Waiting and Hugh B. Cave's Murgunstrumm and Others (the latter volume appeared some years after "Sticks" was written).

== Adaptations ==
In the mid-1980s, "Sticks" was adapted for The Cabinet of Dr. Fritz, a 1984–85 binaural radio drama series produced by Thomas Lopez and the ZBS Foundation for NPR. The adaptation added a love interest/foil for Leverett. Steven Keats played Leverett, while Laura Esterman as Carol and Bill Raymondas Carol George/Althol respectively. The soundtrack was composed by Tim Clark. Samples from this episode were used in the song "Stairs and Flowers" by Canadian electro-industrial band Skinny Puppy, on their 1986 album, Mind: The Perpetual Intercourse.

In June 2019, British synthwave band Kish Kollektiv released a "soundtrack" concept album inspired by "Sticks", entitled Dwellers in the Earth.

Critics have noted similarities between the plot of "Sticks" and that of the film The Blair Witch Project (1999).

"Sticks" was also the inspiration for the lattice stick structures in the HBO show True Detective.
