= World Fantasy Award—Life Achievement =

Literary award for science fiction or fantasy lifetime achievements

- Awarded for: Outstanding service to the fantasy field
- Presented by: World Fantasy Convention
- First award: 1975
- Most recent winners: Clive Barker, Joyce Carol Oates
- Website: worldfantasy.org/awards/

The World Fantasy Awards are given each year by the World Fantasy Convention for the best fantasy fiction and fantasy art published in English during the preceding calendar year. The awards have been described by sources such as The Guardian as a "prestigious fantasy prize", and as one of the three most renowned speculative fiction awards, along with the Hugo and Nebula Awards (which cover both fantasy and science fiction). The World Fantasy Award—Life Achievement is given each year to individuals for their overall career in fields related to fantasy. These have included, for example, authors, editors, and publishers. The specific nomination reasons are not given, and nominees are not required to have retired, though they can only win once. The Life Achievement category has been awarded annually since 1975.

World Fantasy Award nominees are decided by attendees and judges at the annual World Fantasy Convention. A ballot is posted in June for attendees of the current and previous two conferences to determine two of the finalists, and a panel of five judges adds three or more nominees before voting on the overall winner of each category. Unlike the other World Fantasy Award categories, the nominees for the Life Achievement award are not announced; instead, the winner is announced along with the nominees in the other categories. The panel of judges is typically made up of fantasy or horror authors, editors, publishers, booksellers, and others connected to the genres of fantasy and horror in some way and is chosen each year by the World Fantasy Awards Administration, which has the power to break ties. The final results are presented at the World Fantasy Convention at the end of October. Through 2015, winners were presented with a statuette of H. P. Lovecraft; more recent winners receive a statuette of a tree.

During the 52 nomination years, 85 people have been given the Life Achievement Award. Multiple winners have been awarded 26 times, typically two co-winners, though five were noted in 1984. Since 2000, it has become an unofficial tradition for two winners to be announced, often with one winner primarily an author and the other not. While most winners have been authors and editors, six winners have been primarily artists of fantasy art and book covers, and six winners are best known for founding or running publishing houses that produce fantasy works.

== Winners ==
In the following table, the years correspond to the date of the ceremony. Items in the Work(s) column are items and companies that the winner created or worked at; they are meant to be representative of the winner's career in the field of fantasy to that point, but the World Fantasy Award for Life Achievement is not given for any specific achievement, and no such achievements are listed by the World Fantasy Convention as reasons for the award. In many cases the winner is well known for their non-fantasy works, such as science fiction novels, which are not listed.

Winners and nominees
Year	Winner(s)	Work(s)	Ref.
1975	Robert Bloch	Psycho, "That Hell-Bound Train"	
1976	Fritz Leiber	"Gonna Roll the Bones", Ill Met in Lankhmar	
1977	Ray Bradbury	Dandelion Wine, The Illustrated Man	
1978	Frank Belknap Long	The Hounds of Tindalos, The Horror from the Hills	
1979	Jorge Luis Borges	"The Garden of Forking Paths", Ficciones	
1980	Manly Wade Wellman	Worse Things Waiting, Who Fears the Devil?	
1981	C. L. Moore	Jirel of Joiry, Northwest of Earth	
1982	Italo Calvino	The Baron in the Trees, The Castle of Crossed Destinies	
1983	Roald Dahl	James and the Giant Peach, Charlie and the Chocolate Factory	
1984	L. Sprague de Camp	The Goblin Tower, Land of Unreason	
1984	Richard Matheson	Bid Time Return, I Am Legend	
1984	E. Hoffmann Price	"Through the Gates of the Silver Key", Far Lands, Other Days	
1984	Jack Vance	The Dying Earth, Lyonesse Trilogy	
1984	Donald Wandrei (Note: Donald Wandrei refused to accept the 1984 Life Achievement award, as he felt the award bust was a demeaning caricature of Lovecraft, whom he had known personally.)	The Web of Easter Island, Strange Harvest	
1985	Theodore Sturgeon	Without Sorcery, E Pluribus Unicorn	
1986	Avram Davidson	The Phoenix and the Mirror, Vergil in Averno	
1987	Jack Finney	The Body Snatchers, Marion's Wall	
1988	Everett F. Bleiler	Editing Guide to Supernatural Fiction, A Treasury of Victorian Ghost Stories	
1989	Evangeline Walton	The Island of the Mighty, The Song of Rhiannon	
1990	R. A. Lafferty	Serpent's Egg, The Devil is Dead	
1991	Ray Russell	The Bishop's Daughter, The Devil's Mirror	
1992	Edd Cartier	Artwork for Unknown, Fantasy Press	
1993	Harlan Ellison	Deathbird Stories, Mefisto in Onyx	
1994	Jack Williamson	"Hocus Pocus Universe", Darker Than You Think	
1995	Ursula K. Le Guin	A Wizard of Earthsea, Always Coming Home	
1996	Gene Wolfe	The Book of the New Sun, Soldier of the Mist	
1997	Madeleine L'Engle	A Wrinkle in Time, A Swiftly Tilting Planet	
1998	Edward L. Ferman	Editing The Magazine of Fantasy & Science Fiction, The Best from Fantasy and Science Fiction	
1998	Andre Norton	Witch World, The Halfblood Chronicles	
1999	Hugh B. Cave	Murgunstrumm and Others, Death Stalks the Night	
2000	Marion Zimmer Bradley	The Mists of Avalon, Darkover	
2000	Michael Moorcock	Elric of Melniboné, The Knight of Swords	
2001	Frank Frazetta	Artwork such as Conan the Destroyer, Death Dealer	
2001	Philip José Farmer	Hadon of Ancient Opar, Inside Outside	
2002	Forrest J Ackerman	Editing Famous Monsters of Filmland, work as a literary agent	
2002	George H. Scithers	Editing Weird Tales, Amra	
2003	Lloyd Alexander	The Black Cauldron, The High King	
2003	Donald M. Grant	Founding/running Donald M. Grant, Publisher, Centaur Press	
2004	Stephen King	The Dark Tower: The Gunslinger, It	
2004	Gahan Wilson	Artwork for The Magazine of Fantasy & Science Fiction, The New Yorker	
2005	Tom Doherty	Founder of Tor Books, publisher for Ace Books	
2005	Carol Emshwiller	The Mount, The Start of the End of It All	
2006	John Crowley	Little, Big, Great Work of Time	
2006	Stephen Fabian	Artwork for Dungeons & Dragons, Ladies & Legends	
2007	Betty Ballantine	Co-founded Bantam Books, Ballantine Books	
2007	Diana Wynne Jones	Howl's Moving Castle, Charmed Life	
2008	Leo and Diane Dillon	Artwork for Why Mosquitoes Buzz in People's Ears, Ashanti to Zulu	
2008	Patricia A. McKillip	Harpist in the Wind, The Forgotten Beasts of Eld	
2009	Ellen Asher	Editor of Science Fiction Book Club, New American Library	
2009	Jane Yolen	Owl Moon, Lost Girls	
2010	Brian Lumley	Necroscope, Blood Brothers	
2010	Terry Pratchett	The Colour of Magic, Mort	
2010	Peter Straub	Ghost Story, The Talisman	
2011	Peter S. Beagle	The Last Unicorn, "Two Hearts"	
2011	Angélica Gorodischer	Kalpa Imperial, Opus dos	
2012	Alan Garner	The Weirdstone of Brisingamen, "The Owl Service"	
2012	George R. R. Martin	A Song of Ice and Fire, Sandkings	
2013	Susan Cooper	The Dark Is Rising, The Grey King	
2013	Tanith Lee	Death's Master, The Birthgrave	
2014	Ellen Datlow	Editing Omni, Year's Best Fantasy and Horror	
2014	Chelsea Quinn Yarbro	The Palace, Ariosto	
2015	Ramsey Campbell	To Wake the Dead, Alone with the Horrors	
2015	Sheri S. Tepper	The True Game, Beauty	
2016	David G. Hartwell	Editor of The New York Review of Science Fiction, Tor Books	
2016	Andrzej Sapkowski	The Witcher Saga	
2017	Terry Brooks	Shannara series, Magic Kingdom of Landover series	
2017	Marina Warner	Research and non-fiction works on fairy tales and myths	
2018	Charles de Lint	Newford series	
2018	Elizabeth Wollheim	President, co-Publisher, and co-Editor-in-Chief of DAW Books	
2019	Hayao Miyazaki	Co-founder of Studio Ghibli, and animator, filmmaker, screenwriter, author, and manga artist of multiple works	
2019	Jack Zipes	Academic and folklorist on fairy tales	
2020	Karen Joy Fowler	We Are All Completely Beside Ourselves, "Always", cofounded the Otherwise Award	
2020	Rowena Morrill	Science fiction and fantasy illustrations	
2021	Megan Lindholm	The Farseer Trilogy, Wizard of the Pigeons	
2021	Howard Waldrop	Science fiction and fantasy short stories	
2022	Samuel R. Delany	Science fiction and fantasy novels, criticism, and essays	
2022	Terri Windling	Year's Best Fantasy and Horror and other anthologies	
2023	Peter Crowther	Co-founder of PS Publishing and editor of anthologies	
2023	John Douglas	Science fiction and fantasy editing	
2024	Ginjer Buchanan	Editor-in-Chief at Ace Books and Roc Books	
2024	Jo Fletcher	Founder and publisher of Jo Fletcher Books	
2025	Juliet Marillier	Daughter of the Forest, Wildwood Dancing	
2025	Michael Whelan	Science fiction and fantasy illustrations	
2026	Clive Barker	Books of Blood, The Hellbound Heart	
2026	Joyce Carol Oates	Haunted: Tales of the Grotesque, American Gothic Tales	
