= In the Palace of Repose =

2005 collection of short stories by Holly Phillips

- Cover of first edition
- Author: Holly Phillips
- Cover artist: Thomas Cole
- Language: English
- Genre: Fantasy
- Publisher: Prime Books
- Publication date: 2005
- Publication place: United States
- Media type: Print (hardcover)
- Pages: 203
- ISBN: 1-894815-58-0

In the Palace of Repose is a collection of fantasy short stories by Canadian writer Holly Phillips, and her first published book. It was initially published in hardcover by Prime Books in May 2005, and in trade paperback by Wildside Press in June of the same year. Prime Books issued a revised trade paperback edition in February 2006, and an ebook edition in October 2012. The book collects nine novelettes and short stories by the author with an introduction by Sean Stewart.

== Contents ==
- "In the Palace of Repose"
- "The Other Grace"
- "The New Ecology"
- "A Woman's Bones"
- "Pen & Ink"
- "One of the Hungry Ones"
- "By the Light of Tomorrow's Sun"
- "Summer Ice"
- "Variations on a Theme"

== Awards ==
The collection won the 2006 Sunburst Award and was a finalist for the 2006 World Fantasy and Crawford awards. "In the Palace of Repose" (the title story) and "The Other Grace" were finalists for the 2004 International Horror Guild Award and the 2006 World Fantasy award, respectively.
