= 3 Tales of Horror =

- Jacket illustration by Lee Brown Coye for 3 Tales of Horror
- Author: H. P. Lovecraft & Divers Hands
- Illustrator: Lee Brown Coye
- Language: English
- Genre: Fantasy, horror, science fiction
- Publisher: Arkham House
- Publication date: 1967
- Publication place: United States
- Media type: Print (hardback)
- Pages: 134 pp

3 Tales of Horror is an illustrated collection of stories by American author H. P. Lovecraft. Initially announced under the title Three Arkham Tales, it was released in 1967 by Arkham House in an edition of 1,522 copies. The book includes 15 drawings by American artist Lee Brown Coye.

== Contents ==
3 Tales of Horror contains the following stories:

1. "The Colour Out of Space"
2. "The Dunwich Horror"
3. "The Thing on the Doorstep"
