= A Natural History of Hell =

2016 short story collection by Jeffrey Ford

- Author: Jeffrey Ford
- Language: English
- Genre: Short Fiction
- Publisher: Small Beer Press
- Publication date: 12 July 2016
- Publication place: United States
- Media type: Paperback
- Pages: 279 pp
- ISBN: 978-1-61873-118-0

A Natural History of Hell is a collection of thirteen stories written by Jeffrey Ford and released in July 2016. The collection has won the 2017 World Fantasy Award for Best Collection as well as the 2016 Shirley Jackson Award for Best Single-Author Short Story Collection.

== Author ==
Jeffrey Ford is an American fantasy, science fiction, and mystery writer, born in Long Island, New York State on 8 November 1955. He now lives in Ohio and teaches writing part-time at Ohio Wesleyan University.

== Contents ==
- The Blameless: A world where exorcisms are as casual as a sweet sixteen
- Word Doll: A take on the harvest spirit/monster theme
- The Angel Seems: A town suffers the predations of a monstrous angel who offers protection in exchange for occasional poetic and indifferent murder.
- Mount Chary Galore: A bone-chilling story of three young children in a more innocent, more difficult time, and their encounter with the local wise woman.
- A Natural History of Autumn: Evil Japanese demons and their wild shenanigans.
- Blood Drive: A re-imagined America encourages both high school students and teachers carry firearms
- A Terror: Emily Dickinson takes that famed carriage ride with Death.
- Rocket Ship to Hell: A science fiction writer meets an old man in a bar who spins a truly "weird tale"
- The Fairy Enterprise: A heartless industrialist determines to manufacture an unusual sort of product, but finds the process unexpectedly demanding.
- The Last Triangle: An addict is rescued by a little old lady.
- Spirits of Salt: A Tale of the Coral Heart
- The Thyme Fiend: A young in Ohio who sees strange things. The spirits of the dead come back to resolve some mysteries in the living world.
- The Prelate's Commission: A story about trying to put a face on the devil and how the devil feels about such efforts.
