= Isabel Yap =

- Born: May 23, 1990; Manila
- Education: Ateneo de Manila University, Santa Clara University, Harvard Business School
- Website: isabelyap.com

Isabel Yap (born May 23, 1990) is a Filipina science fiction writer and poet.

== Early life and education ==
Isabel Yap was born on May 23, 1990, in Manila. She grew up in Quezon City and attended Ateneo de Manila University from 2008 to 2010. She was very active publishing in Filipino speculative fiction anthologies. She moved to the United States in 2010 and graduated from Santa Clara University with a degree in marketing in 2013. In 2013, she won the Tamara Verga Academy of American Poets Prize and attended the Clarion Science Fiction and Fantasy Writers' Workshop. She earned an MBA from Harvard Business School in 2020.

== Published work ==
She made her debut in American professional science fiction markets in 2014 with the stories "Have You Heard the One About Anamaria Marquez?" in Nightmare and "A Cup of Salt Tears" in Reactor. The latter story was included in the 2015 anthology Year's Best Weird Fiction Volume 2. Her short story "Asphalt, River, Mother, Child" was published in Strange Horizons in 2018 and included in the 2019 anthology The Year's Best Dark Fantasy & Horror. Her novelette "How to Swallow the Moon", published in Uncanny Magazine in 2018, was a finalist for the 2019 Locus Award for Best Novelette. Her novella "A Canticle for Lost Girls" was nominated for the 2022 World Fantasy Award— Best Novella. All of those stories were included in her collection Never Have I Ever (2021) from Small Beer Press. Never Have I Ever was a finalist for the 2022 Locus Award for Best Collection, nominated for the 2022 World Fantasy Award—Collection, the 2022 Ignyte Award for Outstanding Anthology/Collected Works, the 2022 IAFA William L. Crawford Fantasy Award for best first fantasy book, and won the 2022 British Fantasy Award for Best Collection and the 2021 Best Collection Award at the Ladies of Horror Fiction Awards.

== Bibliography ==
- Never Have I Ever, Small Beer Press, 2021.
