= The Eel (fictional character) =

The Eel is a pulp fiction character, a gentleman thief of "courageous action and questionable morals," created by Hugh B. Cave, writing under the pseudonym Justin Case. Short stories about The Eel originally appeared from 1936 to 1942 in the Spicy magazines issued by Culture Publications. The Eel had no other name.

In the first of the series, "Eel Trap," the author introduces the character:

I like my name, The Eel. People have been calling me that ever since I began working on the theory, years ago, that the world owed me a living and damned if I wouldn't collect it. Matter of fact, the gentry of the law who tagged me with the name now like it a whole lot less than I do. Eels tend to be slippery, no?

Cave would later explain, in his foreword to Escapades of the Eel, that it was his admiration of author Damon Runyon that led him to write the adventures using "the same present-tense, first-person narrative style that marked so many of his great yarns."

== Stories ==
1. "Eel Trap" (in Spicy Adventure Stories, June 1936)
2. "The Evil Flame" (in Spicy Mystery Stories, August 1936)
3. "Dark Temple of Torment" (in Spicy Adventure Stories, January 1937)
4. "Death to Cops" (in Spicy Detective Stories, January 1937)
5. "River of Blood" (in Spicy Adventure Stories, April 1937)
6. "Cavern of the Damned" (in Spicy Mystery Stories, May 1937)
7. "Eel Poison" (in Spicy Detective Stories, August 1937)
8. "Death Wears No Robe" (in Spicy Detective Stories, October 1937)
9. "The Eel Slips Through" (in Spicy Detective Stories, December 1937)
10. "Eel Bait" (in Spicy Adventure Stories, February 1938)
11. "Prisoner of Tituan" (in Spicy Adventure Stories, April 1938)
12. "The Widow Wears Scarlet" (in Spicy Detective Stories, October 1940)
13. "The Lady's Last Laugh" (in Spicy Detective Stories, December 1940)
14. "Annie Any More" (in Spicy Detective Stories, March 1941)
15. "The Second Slug" (in Spicy Detective Stories, July 1941)
16. "A Pile of Publicity" (in Spicy Detective Stories, January 1942)
17. "Eel's Eve" (in Spicy Detective Stories, April 1942)

== Reprints ==
All 15 Eel tales were later reprinted in a compilation, Escapades of the Eel, published by Tattered Pages Press of Chicago, in 1997 (ISBN 1-884449-06-9).
