= Holly Phillips =

Science fiction and fantasy writer

- Born: December 25, 1969 (age 56); Nelson, British Columbia
- Occupation: author
- Writing career
- Genres: Science fiction, fantasy

Holly Phillips (born 25 December 1969) is a Canadian writer of science fiction and fantasy.

== Life and career ==
Phillips was born in Nelson, British Columbia. She was raised in Trail and other small towns in British Columbia. She attended Simon Fraser University in Burnaby, but contracted fibromyalgia and did not complete her degree. Resettling in Trail in 1994, she took creative writing classes at a community arts collective. Her early short stories mostly appeared in small-press magazines. Her first was published in 2000 in On Spec magazine, for which she was a member of the editorial board for four years beginning in 2001. Her work, often straddling a borderline between science fiction and fantasy, tends to focus on protagonists in ambiguous situations that can be explained or understood in different, often mutually incompatible ways. In addition to writing she is a member of the Celtic folk music trio Pickled Thistle.

== Awards and honours ==
Phillips's stories "In the Palace of Repose" and "The Other Grace" were finalists for the 2004 International Horror Guild Award and the 2006 World Fantasy award, respectively. Her collection In the Palace of Repose won the 2006 Sunburst Award and was a finalist for the 2006 World Fantasy and Crawford awards.

== Bibliography ==
=== Novels ===
- The Burning Girl (2006)
- The Engine's Child (2008)

=== Collections ===
- In the Palace of Repose (2005)
- At the Edge of Waking (2012)

=== Anthologies ===
- Tesseracts Eleven: Amazing Canadian Science Fiction (2007 - with Cory Doctorow)

=== Short stories ===
- "No Such Thing As an Ex-Con" (2000)
- "Adapting for the Deep" (2001)
- "Last One" (2001)
- "An Instant Remedy" (2002)
- "The New Ecology" (2002; collected in In the Palace of Repose, 2005)
- "The Season of Her Return" (2002)
- "All the Room in the World" (2002)
- "Alchemy" (2003)
- "The Gate Between Hope and Glory" (2003)
- "A Beggar in Shadow" (2004)
- "The Dead Boy" (2004)
- "In the Palace of Repose" (2004; collected in In the Palace of Repose, 2005)
- "In the Shadow of Your Head" (2004)
- "Luck of the Gods" (2004)
- "A Woman's Bones" (2005; collected in In the Palace of Repose, 2005)
- "By the Light of Tomorrow's Sun" (2005; collected in In the Palace of Repose, 2005)
- "One of the Hungry Ones" (2005; collected in In the Palace of Repose, 2005)
- "Pen & Ink" (2005; collected in In the Palace of Repose, 2005)
- "The Other Grace" (2005; collected in In the Palace of Repose, 2005)
- "Variations on a Theme" (2005; collected in In the Palace of Repose, 2005)
- "The Lass of Loch Royal" (2005)
- "Summer Ice" (2005; collected in In the Palace of Repose, 2005)
- "Virgin of the Sands" (2006; collected in At the Edge of Waking, 2012)
- "canvas, mirror, glass" (2006)
- "Gin" (2006; collected in At the Edge of Waking, 2012)
- "Queen of the Butterfly Kingdom" (2007; collected in At the Edge of Waking, 2012)
- "The Oracle Spoke" (2007)
- "Three Days of Rain" (2007; collected in At the Edge of Waking, 2012)
- "Brother of the Moon" (2007; collected in At the Edge of Waking, 2012)
- "Field Time" (2007)
- "The Past Never Dies" (2007)
- "Proving the Rule" (2008; collected in At the Edge of Waking, 2012)
- "The Small Door" (2008)
- "The Long, Cold Goodbye" (2009; collected in At the Edge of Waking, 2012)
- "Thieves of Silence" (2009)
- "Cold Water Survival" (2009; collected in At the Edge of Waking, 2012)
- "Last Drink Bird Head" (2009)
- "Country Mothers' Sons" (2010; collected in At the Edge of Waking, 2012)
- "The Rescue" (2010; collected in At the Edge of Waking, 2012)
- "Castle Rock" (2012; collected in At the Edge of Waking, 2012)

=== Poetry ===
- "Soon Enough" (2003)
- "Sister Dark" (2005)
- "Sister Light" (2005)
- "Grey November" (2006)
- "Rain"" (2006)

=== Articles ===
- "O for a muse of fire ... " (2002)
- "Editorial: That Kind of Thing" (2002)
