= Attica (novel) =

2006 novel by Garry Kilworth

- Author: Garry Kilworth
- Language: English
- Genre: Fantasy
- Publisher: ATOM
- Publication date: March 2006
- Publication place: United Kingdom
- Media type: Print (Hardcover)
- Pages: 348 pages
- ISBN: 1-904233-55-4

Attica is a 2006 children's fantasy novel by the British writer Garry Kilworth.

== Plot ==
Attica follows the adventures of 12-year-old Chloe and her brothers: Jordy, 12, and Alex, 10.

Chloe and Alex's father died of a heart attack when they were just 8 and respectively, 6. Their mother, Dipa has been trying to find a new husband since her children's father died. When she does, the kids have a surprise: they are going to have a new brother. Jordy, three months older than Chloe, is the exact opposite of Chloe and Alex, so they are not so happy when their family enlarges to five members.

Ben, Jordy's father and Chloe and Alex's stepfather is a paramedic and Dipa, a doctor, so the kids are used not having their parents at home. But when they move to Winchester to a rented apartment everything is going to change. Mr. John Grantham, the old man that rented them half of the house he lives in, tells Chloe about the girl he loved in the 1930s and 1940s. Susan married a much richer and older man, but she gave Grantham a clock that sings Frère Jacques, a clock that he cannot find. Chloe offers to take her brothers and to search in the attic and so the adventure begins.

On their way, Chloe, Jordy and Alex discover all kinds of dark secrets of the attic, which they have named "Attica", and all sorts of characters, such as Atticans, a race of creatures with bumps on their heads that think that all humans are ghosts and monsters of the Attic.

== Characters ==
- Chloe, born September 1994, main character
- Alex, born 1996, main character
- Jordy, born July 1994, main character

== Reception ==
In a starred review, Booklist's Krista Hutley called Attica "a rare find". Beyond highlighting Hutley's ability to "innovative fantasy adventure", Hutley praised both the characterization and story, noting that "the children have distinct personalities and react to Attica in realistic ways, finding their own strengths in this exhilarating, unpredictable environment".

To the contrary, Kirkus Reviews thought the novel "suffers from an overabundance of detail and a truly leaden pace". They explained, "The children accept their strange milieu far too readily, and though their difficulties are often interesting and imaginative, they are never very—well, difficult." They concluded, "Diehard fans of British fantasy may enjoy this coincidence-filled entry in the parallel-magical-world subgenre, but it is not for every collection".
