= The Shadow Year =

2008 book by Jeffrey Ford

The Shadow Year is a 2008 novel by Jeffrey Ford.

== Background ==
The novel is an expansion of the novella "Botch Town", which was published in his 2006 short story collection The Empire of Ice Cream. The novella was nominated for the World Fantasy Award—Novella and the Locus Award for Best Novella in 2006.

In an interview with Locus, Ford said that the concept behind the novel was based on events from his life, and "was really kind of a memoir" before his editor encouraged him to rewrite the novel and "make it a story." The model town built by the protagonists in their basement is based on a train set that Ford and his brother played with during their childhood.

== Synopsis ==
Three children, two boys, and a girl live in a quiet Long Island town with their alcoholic mother and hardworking father in the 1960s. The boys build Botch Town, a tiny model of their hometown in the basement. One summer, a prowler begins terrorizing their neighborhood during a string of mysterious events such as disappearances and deaths. As the brothers follow their suspicions about the killer's identity, they realize that their younger sister, a savant, has been moving around figures in their model to act out events before they happen in the future.

== Genre and writing style ==
The novel includes elements from a number of genres, including mystery, science fiction and fantasy. Mark Yon, in SFFWorld, compared it to the genre-bending work of Ray Bradbury, particularly Bradbury's Something Wicked This Way Comes. Several reviewers compared The Shadow Year's tone and humor to Stephen King's Stand by Me.

== Reception ==
The book garnered a mixed to positive reception from critics. Michael Levy, in a review for Strange Horizons, praised the novel but acknowledged that its ambiguity and open ended mysteries might alienate some readers. Kirkus Reviews gave the book a starred review and calling it "Properly creepy, but from time to time deliciously funny and heart-breakingly poignant."

Publishers Weekly described it as "disappointing", criticizing the novel's numerous subplots and lack of momentum.

It won the 2009 Shirley Jackson Award for Novel, and the World Fantasy Award—Novel. It was a finalist for the Locus Award for Best Fantasy Novel.
