= The Night of Kadar =

1978 novel by Garry Kilworth

- First edition
- Author: Garry Kilworth
- Language: English
- Genre: Science fiction
- Publisher: Faber and Faber
- Publication date: 1978
- Publication place: United Kingdom
- Media type: Print (Hardcover and Paperback)
- Pages: 193
- ISBN: 0-571-11202-1

The Night of Kadar is a science fiction novel by British writer Garry Kilworth, published in 1978.

== Plot summary ==
The Night of Kadar tells the story of a crew of interplanetary colonists. They are transported to their new world as embryos in a state of suspended animation. As they approach their destination, the embryos experience programmed, accelerated maturation through childhood, puberty and adulthood while still asleep. The computers educate the colonists in their sleep by generating simulated childhoods for them. On their approach to a distant planet, an alien life force enters the ship. It investigates and interferes with the minds of the sleeping humans and also subtly disrupts some of the on-board systems. Upon landing on the planet, the spacecraft disassembles itself to form machinery more suited to the new world and the crew emerge from their artificial uteri as fully formed adults, each with his or her own memories of a computer simulated childhood on Earth. and the crew experiences confusion and disorientation. Due to the alien force's interference with the ship's teaching units, the humans' knowledge of their purpose on the planet is lost. Some believe they are colonists, others believe they are soldiers sent to fight some unknown enemy; this latter belief is reinforced by the large number of weapons such as missiles that have been installed by the automated systems on landing.

Eventually one man, Othman, takes a position of leadership (one that is initially aggressive and autocratic, but which mellows over the years). He organizes the setup of the colony and the exploration of the world, although he has only a fragment of the manpower and equipment originally assigned to the mission. This is due to the fact that a large number of their party have, due to the alien interference, emerged from the artificial uteri as "morons" who do not speak or interact in any meaningful way with the rest of the party but seem more interested in the planet's natural environment.

An interesting distinction of this novel is in the religion of the crew: they are Muslims, albeit incomplete ones. Although they have knowledge of Allah the knowledge of Islamic art, culture and ritual, as well as the traditional imagery of the Islamic heaven and hell was omitted from their computer simulated childhoods by the authors of their mission, due to the concern that such material ideas would be irrelevant on a new planet; only the spirit of the religion was preserved. Yet throughout the novel, a sense of lost heritage and memory continues to gnaw at the colonists, if only in a vague, unsettling way. By embracing their religion, they gain a measure of solace. Although Islam is a relatively minor aspect of Kadar, it does make the novel stand out from the run-of-the-mill science fiction of the 1970s, anticipating by several decades the West's newfound interest in Islam.

It soon becomes clear that the settlers are on an island surrounded by a kind of quicksand. Whereas some are content to stay on this island and build their colony, their leader Othman has a seemingly irrational lean towards the nomadic way of life, and commands the building of a bridge to the mainland. Meanwhile, the "morons" associate more and more with the local indigenous inhabitants of the island; the "stickmen", creatures who are mute and largely benign, although they can protect themselves with electrical discharges. The "morons" come to be mentally linked to the stickmen, and form a kind of collective consciousness with them and the planet. The "morons" even take on the electrical defensive properties of the stickmen.

The building of the bridge eventually fails as the planet enters its summer cycle after many Earth years, and the quicksand surrounding the island hardens. Othman commands his people to leave the island by walking across the hardened ground with their equipment and animals (including horses and camels) towards the mainland that had been the objective of the failed causeway. At the same time, the morons and the stickmen leave the island together in the opposite direction from Othman's people, with the exception of one, F'Dar, who unknowingly had caused Othman's right-hand man, Jessum, to be disabled in an accident, and stays with Jessum as his servant out of a sense of responsibility. Soon, however, some enormous, beetle-like creatures do pose a threat. The colonists also have occasional run-ins with a strange, glowing whirlwind that appears and disappears without warning.

Eventually, after a series of travels and adventures, the colonists discover a tribe of fierce, brutish humans. These savages vastly outnumber Othman's people, and eventually overwhelm them. At the end of the novel, Osman and his men learn the truth; these primitive people are from another spacecraft, and Othman deduces that his own mission (as evidenced by the many weapons observed in the beginning) was to establish a base to protect these other people. This second tribe of humans have likewise been interfered with by the alien force, but to much greater detriment than Othman's people. These unfortunates have lost all knowledge of modern technology, and know no better than to turn broken bits of equipment into primitive weapons for slaughter. In the end, the reader learns that all of the tribulations of Othman and his people were machinations of an alien life force. The same being that had disrupted the minds of the crew in the first place has been operating the glowing whirlwinds as a kind of mobile, remote monitor, controlled by formless aliens on a nearby planet.

In the end, Othman, now a much wiser and gentler man, reunited with his wife, Silandi, with whom he had become estranged early in the novel, continues to lead his people in their nomadic, Bedu-like existence, in which they have found some degree of contentment, with new generations replacing the original settles. Eventually, only Othman and F'Dar remain; the elderly and highly revered sole survivors of the original group. Eventually F'Dar dies, after possibly receiving a telepathic signal from a bird, aided by one of the new children whom he has trained to understand the telepathic patterns of the planet, that his own people, the "morons" survived their own exodus with the stickmen. Othman is then left the lone original member of the spacecraft's crew still living, but is a contented man.
