= The Redward Edward Papers =

1971 collection of short stories by Avram Davidson

- Cover of first edition
- Author: Avram Davidson
- Cover artist: Peter Rauch
- Language: English
- Genre: Science fiction, fantasy
- Publisher: Doubleday
- Publication date: 1978
- Publication place: United States
- Media type: Print (hardcover)
- Pages: xiv, 208
- ISBN: 0-385-02058-9
- OCLC: 3892832

The Redward Edward Papers is a collection of science fiction and fantasy short stories, written by American author Avram Davidson and edited by Michael Kurland. It was first published in hardcover by Doubleday in July 1978. An ebook edition was issued by Gateway/Orion in August 2013. The collection has been translated into French.

== Summary ==
The book collects six novelettes and short stories, with a foreword by editor Michael Kurland, an introduction by Randall Garrett, and afterwords to each story and to the entire collection by the author. The title story appears for the first time in the collection; the other pieces were originally published in The Magazine of Fantasy & Science Fiction and Ellery Queen's Mystery Magazine.

== Contents ==
- "Foreword" (Michael Kurland)
- "Introduction" (Randall Garrett)
- "Sacheverell" (from The Magazine of Fantasy & Science Fiction, Mar. 1964)
- "Afterword for Sacheverell"
- "The Lord of Central Park" (from Ellery Queen's Mystery Magazine, Oct. 1970)
- "Afterword for The Lord of Central Park"
- "The Grantha Sighting" (from The Magazine of Fantasy & Science Fiction, Apr. 1958)
- "Afterword for The Grantha Sighting"
- "The Singular Events...." (from The Magazine of Fantasy & Science Fiction, Feb. 1962)
- "Afterword for The Singular Events...."
- "Dagon" (from The Magazine of Fantasy & Science Fiction, Oct. 1959)
- "Afterword for Dagon"
- "The Redward Edward Papers"
  - "I Weep, I Cry, I Glorify"
  - "The 13th Brumaire"
  - "Lemuria Revisited"
  - "In Which the Lodge Is Tiled"
  - "Partial Comfort"
- "Afterword for The Redward Edward Papers"
- "Afterword to Entire Book"

== Recognition ==
The book was nominated for the 1979 World Fantasy Award for Best Anthology/Collection, and placed fifteenth in the 1979 Locus Poll Award for Best Single Author Collection.

== Reception ==
Charles N. Brown in Isaac Asimov's Science Fiction Magazine calls the author "one of the finest short story writers in the English language," though "[u]nfortunately ... very much underrated." He finds the book "excellent, the title story "charming, witty, and urbane, with just the right touch of maniacal whimsy," and the other stories "even better," referring to "Sacheverell" and "The Lord of Central Park" as "wonderful," "The Grantha Sighting" as "devastatingly funny," and "The Singular Events...." and "Dagon" as pieces that "would stand out in any anthology." He warns, however, that the afterwords "don't add much," and the introductory materials are "fillers."

The collection was also reviewed by Algis Budrys in The Magazine of Fantasy and Science Fiction, March 1979, and Darrell Schweitzer in Science Fiction Review, May 1979.
