= Let's Go to Golgotha! =

1975 short story by Garry Kilworth

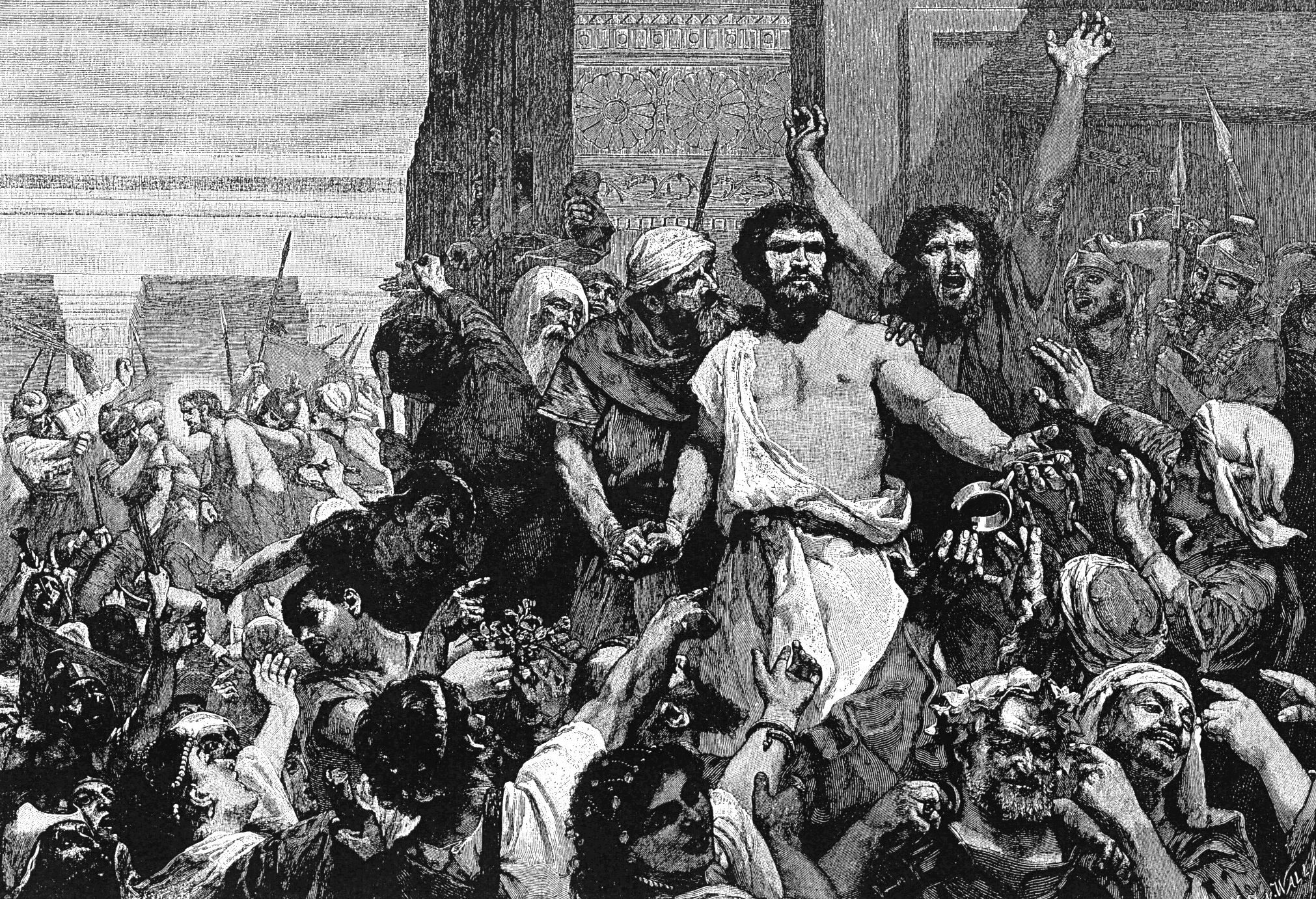
"Give us Barabbas!" (from The Bible and its Story Taught by One Thousand Picture Lessons, 1910).

"Let's Go to Golgotha!" is a 1975 science fiction story by Garry Kilworth.

== Plot summary ==
Time-travelling tourists go on a "Crucifixion Tour". The tour operator warns the tourists that they must not do anything to disrupt history: specifically, when the crowd is asked whether to spare Jesus or Barabbas, the tourists must all join the call "Give us Barabbas!" (a priest absolves them from any guilt for so doing). However, when the moment comes, the protagonist suddenly realizes that the crowd condemning Jesus to the cross is composed entirely of tourists from the future, and that no actual Jewish Jerusalemites of 33 AD are present at all.

== Publication history ==
"Let's Go" was originally published in the Sunday Times Weekly Review, on December 15, 1974; a Times contest-winner, it was Kilworth's first published science fiction. It has subsequently been republished in Gollancz - Sunday Times Best SF Stories (1975), The Best Science Fiction Stories (1977), Let's Go To Golgotha: the Gollancz - Sunday Times Best SF Stories (1979), Constellations: Stories of the Future (1980), Zielzeit (German language, 1985), Les ramages de la douleur (French language, 1988), Not the Only Planet (1998), and The Young Oxford Book of Timewarp Stories (2001).

== Reception ==
John Clute has referred to the story as a "heavily ironic parable", and Paul Kincaid has called it "excellent" and "a fine harbinger of [Kilworth's] career".
