= A Theatre of Timesmiths =

1984 novel by Garry Kilworth

- Author: Garry Kilworth
- Language: English
- Publisher: Gollancz
- Publication date: 1984
- ISBN: 0-575-03411-4 (first edition)
- Dewey Decimal: 823.914

A Theatre of Timesmiths is a science fiction novel by British writer Garry Kilworth, first published in 1984.

== Plot summary ==
A Theatre of Timesmiths is set in a city trapped behind walls of ice, where the computer which runs its heating is about to fail.

== Reception ==
Dave Langford reviewed A Theatre of Timesmiths for White Dwarf #54, and stated that "This kind of book demands a stream of small revelations en route to the big ones; Kilworth handles this well, concluding with a leap into metaphysics which might have taken me by surprise if I hadn't read too much Ian Watson. Effectively and colourfully written."

== Reviews ==
- Review by Chris Morgan (1984) in Fantasy Review, September 1984
- Review by Chris Bailey (1984) in Vector 123
- Review by Mary Gentle (1984) in Interzone, #9 Autumn 1984, (1984)
- Review by Richard Law (1985) in Fantasy Review, August 1985
- Review by Tom Easton (1986) in Analog Science Fiction/Science Fact, March 1986
- Review by Carol McGeehon (1986) in Fantasy Review, June 1986
