= At the Edge of Waking =

Book by Holly Phillips

- Cover of first edition
- Author: Holly Phillips
- Cover artist: Aurélien Police
- Language: English
- Genre: Fantasy short stories
- Publisher: Prime Books
- Publication date: 2012
- Publication place: United States
- Media type: Print (paperback)
- Pages: 288 pp.
- ISBN: 978-1-60701-356-3

At the Edge of Waking is a collection of fantasy short stories by Holly Phillips. It was first published as an ebook by Prime Books in April 2012. A trade paperback edition followed in September of the same year. The book contains an introduction by Peter S. Beagle and story notes by the author.

== Contents ==
- "Three Days of Rain"
- "Cold Water Survival"
- "Brother of the Moon"
- "The Rescue"
- "Country Mothers' Sons"
- "Proving the Rule"
- "Virgin of the Sands"
- "Gin"
- "Queen of the Butterfly Kingdom"
- "The Long, Cold Goodbye"
- "Castle Rock"
