= Carcosa =

Fictional city

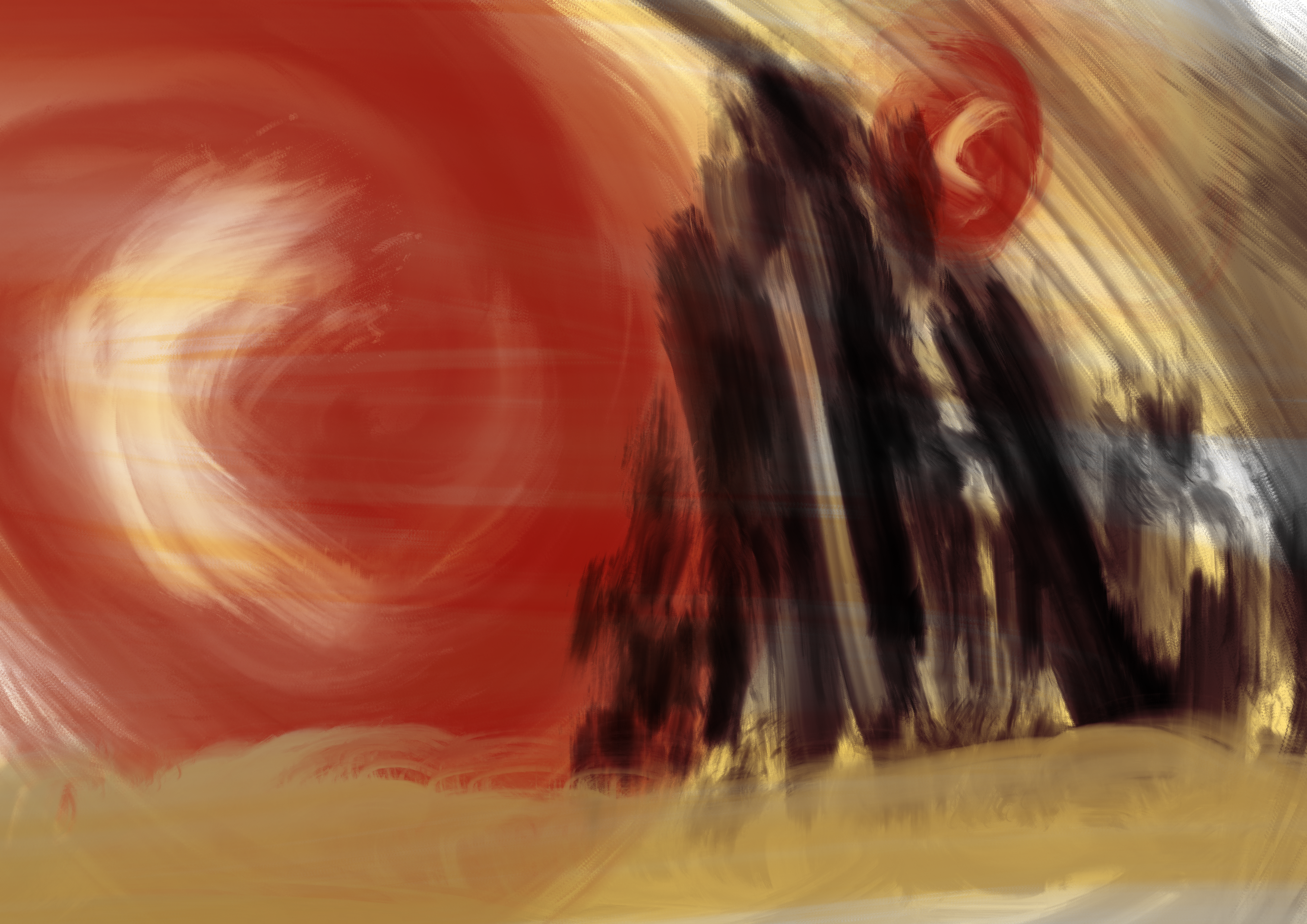
An artist's depiction of Carcosa.

Carcosa (/kɑːrˈkoʊsə/) is a fictional city in Ambrose Bierce's short story "An Inhabitant of Carcosa" (1886). The ancient and mysterious city is barely described and is viewed only in hindsight (after its destruction) by a character who once lived there.

American writer Robert W. Chambers borrowed the name "Carcosa" for several of his short stories featured in the 1895 book The King in Yellow, inspiring generations of authors to similarly use Carcosa in their own works.

== The King in Yellow ==
The city was later used more extensively in Robert W. Chambers' book of short stories published in 1895, titled The King in Yellow. Chambers had read Bierce's work and borrowed a few additional names from his work, including Hali and Hastur.

In Chambers' stories, and within the apocryphal play titled The King in Yellow, which is mentioned several times within them, the city of Carcosa is a mysterious, ancient, and possibly cursed place. The most precise description of its location is the shores of Lake Hali, either on another planet, or in another universe.

For instance:

Along the shore the cloud waves break,
The twin suns sink behind the lake,
The shadows lengthen
In Carcosa.

Strange is the night where black stars rise,
And strange moons circle through the skies,
But stranger still is
Lost Carcosa.

Songs that the Hyades shall sing,
Where flap the tatters of the King,
Must die unheard in
Dim Carcosa.

Song of my soul, my voice is dead,
Die thou, unsung, as tears unshed
Shall dry and die in
Lost Carcosa.

— "Cassilda's Song" in The King in Yellow, Act 1, Scene 2

== Associated names ==
Lake Hali is a misty lake found near the city of Hastur. In the fictional play The King in Yellow (obliquely described by author Robert W. Chambers in the collection of short stories of the same title), the mysterious cities of Alar and Carcosa stand beside the lake. Like Carcosa, it is referenced in the Cthulhu Mythos stories of H. P. Lovecraft and the authors who followed him.

The name Hali originated in Ambrose Bierce's "An Inhabitant of Carcosa" (1886) in which Hali is the author of a quote which prefaces the story. The narrator of the story implies that the person named Hali is now dead (at least in the timeline of the story).

Several other nearly undescribed places are alluded to in Chambers' writing, among them Hastur, Yhtill, and Aldebaran. "Aldebaran" may refer to the star Aldebaran, likely as it is also associated with the mention of the Hyades star cluster, with which it shares space in the night sky. The Yellow Sign, described as a symbol, not of any human script, is supposed to originate from the same place as Carcosa.

One other name associated is "Demhe" and its "cloudy depths" − this has never been explained either by Chambers or any famous pastiche-writer and so it is not known what exactly "Demhe" is.

Marion Zimmer Bradley (and Diana L. Paxson since Bradley's death) also used the names "Carcosa", "Hali", "Lake of Hali", and "Hastur" in her Darkover series.

== Other appearances ==
=== Written references ===
Later writers, including H. P. Lovecraft and his many admirers, became admirers of Chambers' work and incorporated the names used by Chambers into their own stories, set in the Cthulhu Mythos. The King in Yellow and Carcosa have inspired many modern authors, including Karl Edward Wagner ("The River of Night's Dreaming"), Joseph S. Pulver ("Carl Lee & Cassilda"), Lin Carter, James Blish, Michael Cisco ("He Will Be There"), Ann K. Schwader, Robert M. Price, Galad Elflandsson, Simon Strantzas ("Beyond the Banks of the River Seine"), Charles Stross (in the Laundry Files series), Anders Fager and S. M. Stirling (in the Emberverse series).

Joseph S. Pulver has written nearly 30 tales and poems that are based on and/or include Carcosa, The King in Yellow, or other elements from Robert W. Chambers. Pulver also edited an anthology A Season in Carcosa of new tales based upon The King in Yellow, released by Miskatonic River Press in 2012.

John Scott Tynes contributed to the mythology of Chambers' Carcosa in a series of novellas, "Broadalbin", "Ambrose", and "Sosostris", and essays in issue #1 of The Unspeakable Oath and in Delta Green.

In Paul Edwin Zimmer's Dark Border series, Carcosa is a city where humans mingle with their nearly immortal allies, the Hastur.

In Robert Shea and Robert Anton Wilson's The Illuminatus! Trilogy, Carcosa is connected with an ancient civilization in the Gobi Desert, destroyed when the Illuminati arrived on Earth via flying saucers from the planet Vulcan.

In maps of the world of George R. R. Martin's A Song of Ice and Fire, a city named Carcosa is labeled on the easternmost edge of the map along the coast of a large lake, near other magical cities such as Asshai. In The World of Ice and Fire, it is mentioned that a sorcerer lord lives there who claims to be the sixty-ninth Yellow Emperor, from a dynasty fallen for a thousand years.

In the satirical novel Kamus of Kadizhar: The Black Hole of Carcosa by John Shirley (St. Martin's Press, 1988), Carcosa is the name of a planet whose weird black hole physics figures in the story.

Swedish writer Anders Fager's "Miss Witt's Great Work of Art" features a Stockholm-based coterie known as "The Carcosa Foundation" that worships Hastur.

In David Drake's Lord of the Isles series, Carcosa is the name of the ancient capital of the old kingdom, which collapsed a thousand years before the events of the series.

In S. M. Stirling's Emberverse series, Carcosa is the name of a South Pacific city inhabited by evil people led by the Yellow Raja and the Pallid Mask.

In Lawrence Watt-Evans' The Lords of Dûs series, a character known as the Forgotten King, who dresses in yellow rags, reveals that he was exiled from Carcosa.

In writer Alan Moore's Neonomicon, drawn by artist Jacen Burrowes, the character Johnny Carcosa is the key to a mystical Lovecraftian universe.

In 2026, British author Jacob Rollinson published The Truth of Carcosa, a metafictional horror novel and contemporary tribute to the work of Robert W. Chambers. The plot centers on a lost manuscript written in 1984 by a fictional exiled author, Salvatore Archimboldi (a name referencing the elusive author in Roberto Bolaño's 2666). In the novel, the manuscript—titled The Truth of Carcosa—is a "pure evil" document that Archimboldi attempted to destroy. The narrative follows a biographer and a group of friends in a near-future setting of resurgent nationalism as they uncover the book's connection to corporate conspiracies, interdimensional entities, and the "Yellow King." Critics have described the work as "dossier-horror" that blends cosmic horror with state-of-the-nation dystopia.

=== Television ===
In the HBO original series True Detective, 'Carcosa' is presented as a man-made temple. Located in the backwoods of Louisiana, the temple serves as a place of ritualistic sexual abuse of children and child murder organized by a group of wealthy Louisiana politicians and church leaders. The main characters, Rust Cohle and Marty Hart, storm the temple in the final episode of the season, where they confront a serial killer, who is the most active member of the cult. It is understood that the cult worships the "Yellow King", to whom an effigy is dedicated in the main chamber of 'Carcosa'. The series hints at a larger conspiracy that continues beyond the show, which is in line with Lovecraftian horror, as is a vision experienced by one character that underscores Lovecraftian themes like cosmic indifference.

In Part 3 of the Chilling Adventures of Sabrina, the barker of the traveling amusement park and carnival is named Carcosa, and the carnival in turn named, presumably, after him. Throughout the season of the show, it becomes apparent that the workers at the carnival are all mythological beings of old, with Carcosa himself being the god Pan, his true form being that of a satyr, in the show understood to be the god of madness. The arc of the season revolves partially around the attempts of the carnival workers to resurrect an older deity identified as The Green Man. Themes of madness, death, and resurrection parallel the works of Robert W. Chambers et al.

=== Other references ===
In the 1991 EP Passage to Arcturo by Rotting Christ, the song "Inside The Eye of Algond" nominates the Mystical Carcosa as part of the singer's journey.

The second song of the 2015 album Luminiferous by the American metal band High on Fire is named Carcosa.

Swedish rapper Yung Lean's third album Stranger features the closing track "Yellowman". Carcosa is mentioned in the song.

In 2016, DigiTech released a fuzz pedal called the Carcosa. The pedal featured two modes, named "Hali" and "Demhe".

In the video game Mass Effect 3, there is a planet named Carcosa.

In the video game Elite Dangerous, there is an inhabited star system named Carcosa.

In 2001, the Belgian black metal band Ancient Rites released the album Dim Carcosa. The title track's lyrics consist of excerpts from "Cassilda's Song".

In the early 2000s, a Mysterious Package Company experience called The King in Yellow was introduced, heavily inspired by story and title. Later, a sequel experience entitled Carcosa: Rise of the Cult was created, obviously connected to this shared universe and connected to the original The King in Yellow.

In 2017, Fantasy Flight Games released an expansion for Arkham Horror: The Card Game titled "The Path to Carcosa" in which players investigate occurrences based on The King in Yellow.

Carcosa is mentioned in the song "Strange and Eternal" of the 2022 album Netherheaven by the American technical death metal band Revocation.

The 2025 exploration game Blackshard by French developers Redlock Studio borrows heavily from The King In Yellow in its concepts of a series of Signs; trapped chaos entities that seek to destroy the orderly world of the rigidly geometric Labyrinth, and open the door to a realm called Carcosa, bathed in yellow light.

Australian band Dead Head Redemption reference it in the song The Night, which draws heavy influences from the location and events of True Detective (Season 1). The lyrics in the final part of the song are; “See the black stars rise, see the twin suns set - sinking behind the lake and we’ll be in Carcosa yet.”

The city of Carcosa is visited by the characters of a scripted Minecraft video titled "Destroying A World That Doesn't Exist" created by the YouTuber Wifies and uploaded in 2026.

The 2026 video game Saros by Housemarque is set on the planet Carcosa, where it is described as "a shape-shifting, hostile alien planet" and is in ruins, overrun with alien creatures and machinery.

In the DOOM video game mod Sewerlust released in 2026 the last secret level is called "Carcosa", where at the end the player instantly dies and the rimes from the The King in Yellow are re-cited.

== Publishers using the name Carcosa ==
Two different publishers have used the name Carcosa.

=== Carcosa House ===
Carcosa House was a science fiction specialty publishing firm formed in 1947 by Frederick B. Shroyer, a boyhood friend of T. E. Dikty, and two Los Angeles science fiction fans, Russell Hodgkins and Paul Skeeters. Shroyer had secured a copy of the original newspaper appearance of the novel Edison's Conquest of Mars by Garrett P. Serviss which he wished to publish. Shroyer talked Hodgkins and Skeeters into going in on shares to form the publisher which issued the Serviss book in 1947. Dikty offered advice, and William L. Crawford of F.P.C.I. helped with production and distribution. Carcosa House announced one other book, Enter Ghost: A Study in Weird Fiction, by Sam Russell, but due to slow sales of the Serviss book, it was never published.

==== Works published by Carcosa House ====
- Edison's Conquest of Mars, by Garrett P. Serviss (1947)

=== Carcosa ===
Carcosa was a specialty publishing firm formed by David Drake, Karl Edward Wagner, and Jim Groce, who were concerned that Arkham House would cease publication after the death of its founder, August Derleth. Carcosa was founded in North Carolina in 1973 and put out four collections of pulp horror stories, all edited by Wagner. Their first book was a huge omnibus volume of the best non-series weird fiction by Manly Wade Wellman. It was enhanced by a group of chilling illustrations by noted fantasy artist Lee Brown Coye. Their other three volumes were also giant omnibus collections (of work by Hugh B. Cave, E. Hoffmann Price, and again by Manly Wade Wellman). A fifth collection was planned, Death Stalks the Night, by Hugh B. Cave; Lee Brown Coye was working on illustrating it when he suffered a crippling stroke in 1977 and eventually died, causing Carcosa to abandon the project. The book was eventually published by Fedogan & Bremer. Carcosa also had plans to issue volumes by Leigh Brackett, H. Warner Munn, and Jack Williamson; however, none of the projected volumes appeared. The Carcosa colophon depicts the silhouette of a towered city in front of three moons.

==== Awards ====
- 1976, World Fantasy Award, Special Award – Non-Professional to Karl Edward Wagner, David Drake and Jim Groce for Carcosa.

==== Works published by Carcosa ====
- Worse Things Waiting, by Manly Wade Wellman (1973)
- Far Lands, Other Days, by E. Hoffmann Price (1975)
- Murgunstrumm and Others, by Hugh B. Cave (1977)
- Lonely Vigils, by Manly Wade Wellman (1981)

== Places called Carcosa ==
In 1896–97, the Carcosa mansion was built as the official residence of the Resident-General of the Federated Malay States for the first holder of that office, Sir Frank Swettenham. It was in use as a luxury hotel, the Carcosa Seri Negara, from 1989 to 2015. From 2017 until 2019 it was a museum, and since 2025 has been a gallery. Swettenham took the name from The King in Yellow.

In the Quebec-based geopolitical/live-action role-play game Bicolline, Carcosa is a kingdom in the west. It was established upon principles of freedom and is populated by pirates, nomads, escaped slaves, and religious exiles.
