= The Songbirds of Pain =

1984 story collection by Garry Kilworth

Cover of the first edition, published by Gollancz.

The Songbirds of Pain is a science fiction story collection by British writer Garry Kilworth, published in 1984.

== Contents ==
It contains 13 short stories written from 1974 until 1982.

- "Introduction (The Songbirds of Pain)" (1984) •
- "The Dissemblers" (1982)
- "The Rose Bush" (1980)
- "Blind Windows" (1982)
- "Lord of the Dance" (1980)
- "Let's Go to Golgotha!" (1974)
- "Sumi Dreams of a Paper Frog" (1982)
- "Scarlet Fever" (1982)
- "The Man Who Collected Bridges" (1980)
- "The Invisible Foe" (1982)
- "Almost Heaven" (1982)
- "God's Cold Lips" (1979)
- "Oubliette" (1983)
- "The Songbirds of Pain" (1984)

== Reception ==
Dave Langford reviewed The Songbirds of Pain for White Dwarf #60, and stated that "Amid Kilworth's exotic settings, 'ordinary' and 'fantastic' aspects fuse in a blaze of style. Try it."

== Reviews ==
- Review by Chris Morgan (1985) in Fantasy Review, January 1985
- Review by Nigel Richardson (1985) in Vector 124/125
