= Murgunstrumm and Others =

Short story collection by Hugh B. Cave

- Dust-jacket from the first edition
- Author: Hugh B. Cave
- Illustrator: Lee Brown Coye
- Cover artist: Lee Brown Coye
- Language: English
- Genre: horror short stories
- Publisher: Carcosa
- Publication date: 1977
- Publication place: United States
- Media type: Print (hardback)
- Pages: x, 476
- ISBN: 0-913796-02-6
- OCLC: 3684238

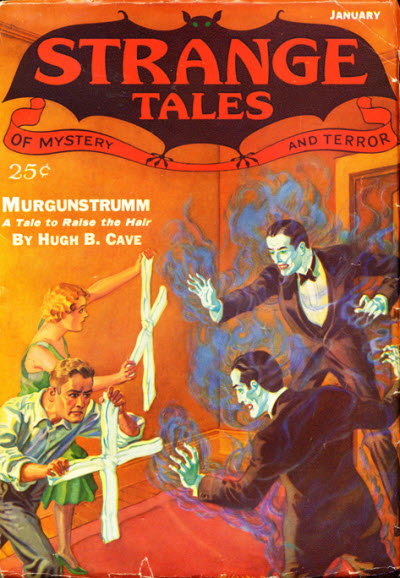
The title novella, "Murgunstrumm", was the cover story in the January 1933 issue of Strange Tales

Murgunstrumm and Others is a collection of horror short stories by American writer Hugh B. Cave. It was released in 1977 by Carcosa in an edition of 2,578 copies of which the 597 copies, that were pre-ordered, were signed by the author and artist. Many of the stories originally appeared in the magazines Strange Tales of Mystery and Terror, Weird Tales, Spicy Mystery Stories, Ghost Stories, Thrilling Mysteries, Black Book Detective Magazine, Argosy, Adventure, Ellery Queen's Mystery Magazine and Whispers. It has since been reissued by Wildside Press in trade paperback and hardcover.

== Awards ==
- 1978, World Fantasy Award, Best Collection/Anthology.

== Contents ==
- Foreword
- "Murgunstrumm"
- "The Watcher in the Green Room"
- "The Prophecy"
- "The Strange Death of Ivan Gromleigh"
- "The Affair of the Clutching Hand"
- "The Strange Case of No. 7"
- "The Isle of Dark Magic"
- "The Whisperers"
- "Horror in Wax"
- "Prey of the Nightborn"
- "Maxon’s Mistress"
- "Dead Man’s Belt"
- "Boomerang"
- "The Crawling Curse"
- "Purr of a Cat"
- "Tomorrow Is Forever"
- "The Ghoul Gallery"
- "The Cult of the White Ape"
- "The Brotherhood of Blood"
- "The Door of Doom"
- "The Death Watch"
- "The Caverns of Time"
- "Many Happy Returns"
- "Ladies in Waiting"
- "The Grisley Death"
- "Stragella"

== Sources ==
- Brown, Charles N.; William G. Contento. "The Locus Index to Science Fiction (2004)".
- Chalker, Jack L.; Mark Owings (1998). The Science-Fantasy Publishers: A Bibliographic History, 1923-1998. Westminster, MD and Baltimore: Mirage Press, Ltd. p. 137.
