= Garry Kilworth =

British novelist

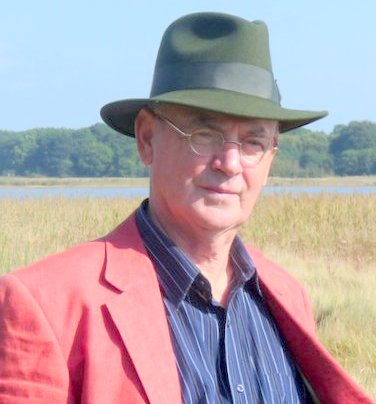
Garry Kilworth

Garry Douglas Kilworth (born 5 July 1941 in York, England) is a British science fiction, fantasy and historical novelist, and a former Royal Air Force cryptographer.

== Early life ==
Kilworth was raised partly in Aden, Yemen, the son of an airman. Having an itinerant father, he travelled widely, both in Britain and abroad, and attended more than 20 different schools before the age of 15. Kilworth is a graduate of King's College London.

== Career ==
Kilworth went to military school and served in the Royal Air Force for 18 years as a cryptographer.

After demobilisation he joined Cable & Wireless, an international telecommunications company, quitting them to become a full-time writer in 1981. His science fiction and fantasy does not have any regular formula, being more interested in the enigmatic and strange. He states that his great passion is short stories, at which he is most adept. However, as an eclectic writer he has produced novels of several genres including science fiction, fantasy, horror, historical, children's fiction, war and literary novels (his novel Witchwater Country was longlisted for the Booker Prize). He has also written several books of short stories and two volumes of poetry (the second with the novelist and short story writer, Robert Holdstock, with whom he shared a lifelong friendship and collaboration). Kilworth continues to produce novels and short stories, and released an autobiography, On My Way To Samarkand, detailing, among other things, his vast travelling experiences over the globe.

He has published one hundred and seventy-four short stories and more than eighty novels. His most recent books are Dragoons, a historical war novel set in South Africa, and Attica, a dark quest set in an attic the size of a continent which was purchased by Johnny Depp's movie company, Adfinitum Nihil. A new collection of stories was published with the title Blood Moon. His latest novel is The Wild Hunt, an Anglo-Saxon Saga.

== Awards ==
Kilworth has been twice shortlisted for the Carnegie Medal for children's fiction and won the Lancashire Children's Book of the Year Award for his short novel The Electric Kid. Kilworth's novel Rogue Officer won the 2008 Charles Whiting Award for Historical War Literature. The Ragthorn, a novella co-authored with Robert Holdstock, won the World Fantasy Award in 1992, and the British Science Fiction Award Winner of Best Short Fiction in 1993.

== Personal life ==
In 1962, he married Annette Bailey, the daughter of an RAF Catalina aircraft pilot.

== Bibliography ==
=== Non-fiction ===
- On My Way To Samarkand – Memoirs of a Travelling Writer (2012)
- Rookie Biker in the Outback (2014)

=== Poetry ===
- Poems, Peoms and Other Atrocities (with Robert Holdstock) (2013)
- Alchemy in Reverse (2017)
- A Rural 1950s Boyhood (2017)
- Poems from my Youth (2017)

=== Novels ===
==== Zulu War novels ====
- Scarlet Sash (2010)
- Dragoons (2011)

==== Angel ====
- Angel (1993)
- Archangel (1994)

==== Navigator Kings ====
- The Roof of Voyaging (1996)
- The Princely Flower (1997)
- Land-of-Mists (1998)

==== Welkin Weasels ====
- Thunder Oak (1997)
- Castle Storm (1998)
- Windjammer Run (1999)
- Gaslight Geezers (2001)
- Vampire Voles (2002)
- Heastward Ho! (2003)

==== Knights of Liöfwende ====
- Spiggot's Quest (2002)
- Mallmoc's Castle (2003)
- Boggart and Fen (2004)

==== 'Fancy Jack' Crossman ====
- The Devil's Own (1997)
- The Valley of Death: Sergeant Jack Crossman and the Battle of Balaclava (1998)
- Soldiers in the Mist (1999)
- The Winter Soldiers (2002)
- Attack on the Redan (2003)
- Brothers of the Blade (2004)
- Rogue Officer (2007)
- Kiwi Wars (2008)

=== Stand-alone novels ===
- In Solitary (1977)
- The Night of Kadar (1978)
- Split Second (1979)
- Gemini God (1981)
- A Theatre of Timesmiths (1984)
- Tree Messiah (1985)
- Highlander (1986) (as Garry Douglas)
- Witchwater Country (1986)
- Spiral Winds (1987)
- The Wizard of Woodworld (1987)
- Cloudrock (1988)
- The Street (1988)
- Abandonati (1988)
- The Voyage of the Vigilance (1988)
- The Rain Ghost (1989)
- Hunter's Moon (1989), published in the US in 1990 as The Foxes of Firstdark
- Midnight's Sun (1990)
- Standing on Shamsan (1991)
- The Drowners (1991)
- The Third Dragon (1991)
- Frost Dancers: A Story of Hares (1992)
- The Raiders (1996)
- Billy Pink's Private Detective Agency (1993)
- The Electric Kid (1994)
- The Phantom Piper (1994)
- The Bronte Girls (1995)
- House of Tribes (1995)
- Cybercats (1996)
- A Midsummer's Nightmare (1996)
- The Gargoyle (1997)
- The Drummer Boy (1998)
- Epix: Heavenly Hosts v. Hell United (1998)
- The Lantern Fox (1998)
- Monster School (1999)
- Hey, New Kid! (1999)
- Shadow-Hawk (1999)
- The Icehouse Boy (2001)
- Soldier's Son (2001)
- Comix: Monster School (2002)
- Nightdancer (2002)
- The Silver Claw (2005)
- Attica (2006)
- Jigsaw (2007)
- The Hundred-Towered City (2008)
- The Iron Wire (2014)
- The Sometimes Spurious Travels Through Time and Space of James Ovit (2017)

=== Short story collections ===
- Let's Go to Golgotha! (1975)
- Hogfoot Right and Bird-Hands (1984)
- The Songbirds of Pain (1984)
- In the Hollow of the Deep-Sea Wave (1989)
- Dark Hills, Hollow Clocks (1990)
- In the Country of Tattooed Men (1993)
- Moby Jack and Other Tall Tales (2005)
- Tales From A Fragrant Harbour (2010)
- The Fabulous Beast (2013)
- Elemetal Tales (2019)
- The Best Short Stories of Garry Kilworth (2019)

=== Novels as FK Salwood ===
- The Oystercatcher's Cry (1993)
- The Saffron Fields (1994)
- The Ragged School (1995)

=== Novels as Kim Hunter ===
- Knight's Dawn (2000)
- Wizard's Funeral (2002)
- Scabbard's Song (2003)

=== Novels as Richard Argent ===
- Winter's Knight (2012)
