= Whispers (magazine) =

Horror and fantasy fiction magazine

Adventure Gaming
- Cover of Issue #1, July 1973
- Editor: Stuart David Schiff
- First issue: July 1973
- Final issue Number: October 1987; 24

Whispers was one of the new horror and fantasy fiction magazines of the 1970s.

== History ==
Stuart David Schiff's early literary influences included the story of Aladdin, the Gorgon and the Cyclops, Edgar Allan Poe, Weird Tales and Lee Brown Coye. He subsequently became an avid collector of horror books and materials.

In 1973, Schiff decided to publish a modest semi-professional little magazine that he hoped would revive the spirit of the defunct legendary horror magazine Weird Tales in a small way. Named after a fictitious magazine referenced in the H. P. Lovecraft horror story "The Unnamable", Whispers was also a followup to August Derleth's The Arkham Collector, which had ceased after Derleth's death.

Whispers was first published in July 1973, and went on to become a more elaborate showcase for dark fantasy fiction and artwork of the 1970s.

The magazine featured shorts stories and poetry by notable science fiction and fantasy writers such as Manly Wade Wellman, Fritz Leiber, Robert Bloch, Ramsey Campbell, Stephen King, Robert E. Howard, Karl Edward Wagner, Roger Zelazny, Michael Shea, Ramsey Campbell, William F. Nolan, Ellen Kushner, Steve Rasnic Tem, Carl Jacobi, Hugh B. Cave, Phyllis Eisenstein, Joseph Payne Brennan, Dennis Etchison, Robert Aickman, Glen Cook, Charles L. Grant, Gerald W. Page, Lisa Tuttle, Richard A. Lupoff, Janet Morris, David Drake and Karl Edward Wagner. The magazine also featured the artwork of Stephen Fabian, Lee Brown Coye, Vincent Napoli, Michael Whelan, Lee Brown Coye, Allen Koszowski, Vincent Di Fate, Charles Vess, Hannes Bok, and many others.

When Schiff and his wife had their first child, Geoffrey, Schiff brought out a special edition of Whispers that focused on the theme of monstrous and ghastly babies.

Whispers ended publication in October 1987 with the issues 23 and 24.

=== Anthologies ===
Beginning in 1978, an anthology series, drawing on work published in the magazine and mixing some new material, was published, first in hardcover by Doubleday and then in paperback by Playboy Press. After Whispers was absorbed by Berkley/Putnam, the new publisher began a trend of parallel publication of increasingly infrequent issues of the magazine and a string of anthologies with an ever-larger proportion of original fiction. A total of six anthologies were published through 1987, and later a "Best of" volume was published in 1994.

== Whispers Press ==
Schiff also launched a book-publishing arm, Whispers Press, in the late 1970s that produced illustrated volumes. The first Whispers Press volume was A Winter Wish, a volume of uncollected poetry by H.P. Lovecraft, edited by Tom Collins. Collins' edition was roundly criticised by S.T. Joshi for being riddled with typographical errors. Shortly thereafter, Whispers Press issued the short novel Rime Isle by Fritz Leiber. Several other publications were issued, most in both trade and signed/numbered/slipcased editions (including Robert Bloch's Cthulhu Mythos novel Strange Eons). After a sampling from Whispers was published in the Gahan Wilson-edited First World Fantasy Awards volume, Schiff and Fritz Leiber co-edited the Second World Fantasy Awards volume for Doubleday.

== Reception ==
In Issue 14 of Abyss, Dave Nalle called this "probably the top fantasy magazine in the country, or even the world ... The magazine has an amazing reputation, and features a lot of art by Steve Fabian." Nalle concluded, "All in all it is a must for anyone seriously interested in what's new in Fantasy and Swords and Sorcery. Excellent critical articles are also featured.""

== Awards ==
- In 1975, Whispers won the first "Howard" (World Fantasy Award) in the category "Non-professional publishing".
- At the 1984 and 1985 Hugo Awards, Whispers was a finalist in the category "Best Semiprozine."

== See also ==
- Science fiction magazine
- Fantasy fiction magazine
- Horror fiction magazine
