= Jeffrey Ford =

American novelist (born 1955)

- Ford at Readercon in 2016
- Born: November 8, 1955 (age 70); West Islip, New York, U.S.
- Education: Binghamton University
- Occupations: Writer, teacher
- Writing career
- Period: 1981–present
- Genres: Science fiction, fantasy
- Website: www.well-builtcity.com

Jeffrey Ford at KGB bar, 2006

Jeffrey Ford (born November 8, 1955) is an American writer in the fantastic genre tradition, although his works have spanned genres including fantasy, science fiction and mystery. His work is characterized by a sweeping imaginative power, humor, literary allusion, and a fascination with tales told within tales. He is a graduate of Binghamton University, where he studied with the novelist John Gardner.

He lives in Ohio and teaches writing part-time at Ohio Wesleyan University. He has also taught as a guest lecturer at the Clarion Workshop for Science Fiction and Fantasy Writers (2004 and 2012), The Antioch University Summer Writing Workshop (2013), LitReactor – 4 Week Online Horror Writing Course (2012), University of Southern Maine's Stonecoast MFA Program in Creative Writing (2011), The Richard Hugo House in Seattle, Washington, (2010).

Ford has contributed over 130 original short stories to numerous print and online magazines and anthologies: The Magazine of Fantasy & Science Fiction, MAD Magazine, Weird Tales, Clarkesworld Magazine, Tor.com, Lightspeed, Subterranean, Fantasy Magazine, The Oxford Book of American Short Stories, Best Science Fiction and Fantasy of the Year, Year’s Best Weird Fiction, Year’s Best Fantasy and Horror, New Jersey Noir, Stories, The Living Dead, The Faery Reel, After, The Dark, The Doll Collection, etc. His fiction has been translated into over fifteen languages and published worldwide.

== Awards ==
His stories and novels have been nominated multiple times for the World Fantasy Award, the Hugo Award, the Nebula Award, the Theodore Sturgeon Award, the International Horror Guild Award, the Fountain Award, Shirley Jackson Award, the Edgar Allan Poe Award, the Bram Stoker Award, the Locus Award, the Seiun Award, the Grand Prix de l'Imaginaire, the Nowa Fantastyka Award, and the Hayakawa Award.

Awards for Jeffrey Ford
Work	Year & Award	Category	Result	Ref.
The Physiognomy	1998 World Fantasy Award	Novel	Won	
The Physiognomy	2005 Seiun Award	Translated Long Work	Nominated	
The Fantasy Writer's Assistant	2000 HOMer Award	Short Story	Nominated	
The Fantasy Writer's Assistant	2001 Locus Award	Short Story	Nominated	
The Fantasy Writer's Assistant	2001 Nebula Award	Short Story	Nominated	
Malthusian's Zombie	2001 Locus Award	Short Story	Nominated	
The Honeyed Knot	2002 World Fantasy Award	Short Fiction	Nominated	
The Honeyed Knot	2002 Locus Award	Short Story	Nominated	
The Beyond	2002 Locus Award	Fantasy Novel	Nominated	
The Trentino Kid	2003 International Horror Guild Award	Short Fiction	Nominated	
The Trentino Kid	2004 Locus Award	Short Story	Nominated	
Creation	2003 World Fantasy Award	Short Fiction	Won	
Creation	2003 Locus Award	Short Story	Nominated	
Creation	2003 Hugo Award	Short Story	Nominated	
Creation	2003 Nebula Award	Short Story	Nominated	
The Weight of Words	2003 World Fantasy Award	Short Fiction	Nominated	
The Weight of Words	2003 Locus Award	Novelette	Nominated	
The Fantasy Writer's Assistant and Other Stories	2003 World Fantasy Award	Collection	Won	
The Fantasy Writer's Assistant and Other Stories	2003 Locus Award	Collection	Nominated	
The Portrait of Mrs. Charbuque	2003 World Fantasy Award	Novel	Nominated	
The Portrait of Mrs. Charbuque	2003 Locus Award	Fantasy Novel	Nominated	
Something by the Sea	2003 Locus Award	Novelette	Nominated	
The Beautiful Gelreesh	2004 Locus Award	Short Story	Nominated	
The Empire of Ice Cream	2004 Locus Award	Novelette	Nominated	
The Empire of Ice Cream	2004 World Fantasy Award	Novella	Nominated	
The Empire of Ice Cream	2004 Hugo Award	Novelette	Nominated	
The Empire of Ice Cream	2004 Nebula Award	Novelette	Won	
The Empire of Ice Cream	2004 Theodore Sturgeon Award	Short Science Fiction	Finalist	
The Empire of Ice Cream	2005 Hayakawa's S-F Magazine Reader's Award	Foreign Short Story	Won	
The Empire of Ice Cream (Collection)	2006 Bram Stoker Award	Fiction Collection	Nominated	
The Empire of Ice Cream (Collection)	2007 Locus Award	Collection	Nominated	
The Empire of Ice Cream (Collection)	2007 World Fantasy Award	Collection	Nominated	
Boatman's Holiday	2005 International Horror Guild Award	Mid-length Fiction	Nominated	
Boatman's Holiday	2006 Locus Award	Short Story	Nominated	
A Night in the Tropics	2005 Locus Award	Novelette	Nominated	
The Annals of Eelin-Ok	2004 Speculative Literature Foundation Fountain Award	Short Story	Won	
The Annals of Eelin-Ok	2005 Locus Award	Short Story	Nominated	
Girl in the Glass	2006 Edgar Allan Poe Award	Paperback Original	Won	
Girl in the Glass	2007 Nebula Award	Novel	Nominated	
Exo-Skeleton Town	2006 Grand Prix de l'Imaginaire	Foreign Short story/Collection of Foreign Short Stories	Won	
A Man of Light	2006 Locus Award	Novelette	Nominated	
Giant Land	2006 Locus Award	Short Story	Nominated	
The Cosmology of the Wider World	2006 Locus Award	Novella	Nominated	
The Cosmology of the Wider World	2006 British Fantasy Award	Novella	Nominated	
The Scribble Mind	2006 Locus Award	Novelette	Nominated	
Botch Town	2007 Locus Award	Novella	Nominated	
Botch Town	2007 World Fantasy Award	Novella	Won	
The Night Whiskey	2007 Locus Award	Novelette	Nominated	
The Way He Does It	2007 Locus Award	Short Story	Nominated	
The Way He Does It	2007 World Fantasy Award	Short Fiction	Nominated	
The Shadow Year	2008 Shirley Jackson Award	Novel	Won	
The Shadow Year	2009 World Fantasy Award	Novel	Won	
The Shadow Year	2009 Locus Award	Fantasy Novel	Nominated	
The Dreaming Wind	2008 Locus Award	Short Story	Nominated	
The Dreaming Wind	2008 Theodore Sturgeon Award	Short Science Fiction	Finalist	
The Dreaming Wind	2009 Nebula Award	Short Story	Nominated	
The Drowned Life	2008 Locus Award	Short Story	Nominated	
The Drowned Life (Collection)	2009 World Fantasy Award	Collection	Won	
The Drowned Life (Collection)	2009 Locus Award	Collection	Nominated	
The Manticore Spell	2008 Locus Award	Short Story	Nominated	
Under the Bottom of the Lake	2008 Locus Award	Short Story	Nominated	
The Dream of Reason	2009 Locus Award	Short Story	Nominated	
The Seventh Expression of the Robot General	2009 Locus Award	Short Story	Nominated	
Polka Dots and Moonbeams	2011 Locus Award	Short Story	Nominated	
The Last Triangle	2012 Shirley Jackson Award	Novelette	Nominated	
Daddy Long Legs of the Evening	2012 Locus Award	Short Story	Nominated	
A Natural History of Autumn	2013 Shirley Jackson Award	Short Fiction	Won	
A Natural History of Autumn	2013 World Fantasy Award	Short Fiction	Nominated	
A Natural History of Autumn	2013 Locus Award	Short Story	Nominated	
Crackpot Palace	2013 Shirley Jackson Award	Collection	Won	
Crackpot Palace	2013 Locus Award	Collection	Nominated	
The Wish Head	2013 Locus Award	Novelette	Nominated	
The Wish Head	2013 Shirley Jackson Award	Novelette	Nominated	
Blood Drive	2013 Locus Award	Short Story	Nominated	
A Terror	2014 Locus Award	Novelette	Nominated	
The Fairy Enterprise	2014 Locus Award	Short Story	Nominated	
Hibbler's Minions	2015 Locus Award	Short Story	Nominated	
The Thyme Fiend	2016 Shirley Jackson Award	Novelette	Nominated	
A Natural History of Hell	2017 Shirley Jackson Award	Collection	Won	
A Natural History of Hell	2017 Locus Award	Collection	Nominated	
A Natural History of Hell	2017 World Fantasy Award	Collection	Won	
The Winter Wraith	2016 Locus Award	Short Story	Nominated	
Witch Hazel	2018 Locus Award	Short Story	Nominated	
The Twilight Pariah	2018 Locus Award	Novella	Nominated	
Ahab's Return	2019 Locus Award	Fantasy Novel	Nominated	
The Bookcase Expedition	2019 Locus Award	Short Story	Nominated	
The Best of Jeffrey Ford	2021 Locus Award	Collection	Nominated	
The Best of Jeffrey Ford	2021 World Fantasy Award	Collection	Nominated	
Out of Body	2021 Locus Award	Novella	Nominated	
Big Dark Hole	2022 World Fantasy Award	Collection	Nominated	
Big Dark Hole	2022 Locus Award	Collection	Nominated	
"Exo-Skeleton Town"	2024 Seiun Award	Translated story	Nominated	

== Bibliography ==
=== Novels ===
- Vanitas (1988)
- The Portrait of Mrs. Charbuque (2002)
- The Girl in the Glass (2005)
- The Shadow Year (2008)
- Ahab's Return (2018)

==== Well-Built City trilogy ====
- The Physiognomy (1997)
- Memoranda (1999)
- The Beyond (2001)

=== Novellas ===
- The Cosmology of the Wider World (2005)
- The Twilight Pariah (2017)
- Out of Body (2020)

=== Collections ===
- The Fantasy Writer's Assistant (2002)
- The Empire of Ice Cream (2006)
- The Drowned Life (2008)
- Crackpot Palace: Stories (2012)
- A Natural History of Hell (2016)
- The Best of Jeffrey Ford (2020)
- Big Dark Hole (2021)
- Pandemonium Waltz (2026)

=== Short stories ===
- "The Casket" (1981)
- "Legacy" (1984)
- "Rapture of the Deep" (1984)
- "The Master of Fiction" (1988)
- "Rose Country" (1989)
- "Never" (1989)
- "The Alchemist, Becalmed At Sea" (1989)
- "The Cosmology of the Wider World" (1990)
- "The Last Half" (1990)
- "The Place Where nothing Moved" (1991)
- "Eclipse" (1991)
- "Couch Dancing" (1992)
- "The Eighth Wonder" (1992)
- "The Colossus of Roads" (1993)
- "Every Richie There Is" (1993)
- "A Hole in the Day" (1993)
- "The Woman Who Counts Her Breath" (1994)
- "The Delicate" (1994)
- "On the Road to New Egypt" (1995)
- "Rabbit Test" (1995)
- "The White Man" (1995)
- "Grass Island" (1995)
- "At Reparata" (2000)
- "Malthusian's Zombie" (2000)
- "Pansolapia" (2001)
- "High Tea With Jules Verne" (2001)
- "The Far Oasis" (2001)
- "Quiet Days in Purgatory" (2001)
- "Horrors By Waters" (2001)
- "The Honeyed Knot" (2001)
- "Exo-Skeleton Town" (2001)
- "Out of the Canyon" (2001)
- "Floating in Lindrethool" (2001)
- "Summer Afternoon" (2001)
- "The Fantasy Writer's Assistant" (2002)
- "Bright Morning" (2002)
- "Creation" (2002)
- "What's Sure to Come" (2002)
- "The Green Word" (2002)
- "Something By the Sea" (2002)
- "The Beautiful Gelreesh" (2003)
- "The Empire of Ice Cream" (2003)
- "The Yellow Chamber" (2003)
- "Present From the Past" (2003)
- "Coffins on the River" (2003)
- "The Annals of Eelin-Ok" (2004)
- "Jupiter's Skull" (2004)
- "The Weight of Words" (2004)
- "A Night in the Tropics" (2004)
- "The Trentino Kid" (2004)
- "The Boatman's Holiday" (2005)
- "Euroborean Lordosis" (2005)
- "Figurative Synesthesia" (2005)
- "The Scribble Mind" (2005)
- "Giant Land" (2005)
- "A Man of Light" (2005)
- "Botch Town" (2006)
- "The Night Whiskey" (2006)
- "The Way He Does It" (2006)
- "The Dreaming Wind" (2007)
- "Under the Bottom of the Lake" (2007)
- "Quitting Dreams" (2007)
- "A Few Things About Ants" (2007)
- "The Bedroom Light" (2007)
- "Ariadne's Mother" (2007)
- "The Drowned Life" (2007)
- "The Manticore Spell" (2007)
- "Daltharee" (2008)
- "The Dream of Reason" (2008)
- "After Moreau" (2008)
- "The Fat One" (2008)
- "The Dismantled Invention of Fate" (2008)
- "The Seventh Expression of the Robot General" (2008)
- "The Golden Dragon" (2008)
- "The War Between Heaven and Hell Wallpaper" (2009)
- "Weiroot" (2009)
- "The Coral Heart" (2009)
- "86 Deathdick Road" (2010)
- "Ganesha" (2010)
- "Sorcerer Minus" (2010)
- "Dr. Lash Remembers" (2010)
- "Polka-dots and Moonbeams" (2010)
- "Down Atsion Road" (2010)
- "Daddy Long Legs of the Evening" (2011)
- "The Last Triangle" (2011)
- "The Summer Palace" (2011)
- "The Hag's Peak Affair" (2011)
- "Gaslight" (2011)
- "Sit the Dead" (2011)
- "Relic" (2011)
- "The Double of My Double Is Not My Double" (2011)
- "Things To Do With Leftover Copies of President Bush's Autobiography" (2011)
- "Glass Eels" (2011)
- "A Natural History of Autumn" (2012)
- "The Angel Seems" (2012)
- "Blood Drive" (2012)
- "The Fairy Enterprise" (2013)
- "The Pittsburgh Technology" (2013)
- "A Meeting in Oz" (2013)
- "Spirits of Salt" (2013)
- "Rocket Ship to Hell" (2013)
- "A Terror" (2013)
- "The Prelate's Commission" (2014)
- "Mount Chary Galore" (2014)
- "La Madre Del Oro" (2014)
- "Hibbler's Minions" (2014)
- "The Order of the Haunted Wood" (2014)
- "The Thyme Fiend" (2015)
- "In Havana" (2015)
- "The 3 Snake Leaves" (2015)
- "The Winter Wraith" (2015)
- "Word Doll" (2015)
- "The Blameless" (2016)
- "The Thousand Eyes" (2016)
- "Not Without Mercy" (2016)
- "The Murmurations of Vienna Von Drome" (2017)
- "The Five Pointed Spell" (2017)
- "Witch Hazel" (2017)
- "All the King's Men" (2017)
- "The Bookcase Expedition" (2018)
- "Thanksgiving" (2018)
- "Big Dark Hole" (2018)
- "Dick Shook" (2018)
- "Sisyphus in Elysium" (2019)
- "The Jeweled Wren" (2019)
- "Snowman On a White Horse" (2019)
- "Incorruptible" (2019)
- "From the Balcony of the Idawolf Arms" (2020)
- "Mr. Sacrobatus" (2020)
- "Monster Eight" (2020)
- "The Ulgrieb Case" (2020)
- "At Raparata" (2020)
- "The Emperor of Ice Cream" (2020)
- "Inn of the Dreaming Dog" (2021)
- "Monkey in the Woods" (2021)
- "The Match" (2021)
- "The Door in the Fence" (2021)
- "The Last Booth" (2021)
- "The Return of Grace Malfrey" (2022)
- "The Golden Hour" (2022)
- "Beautiful Dreamer" (2022)
- "Born Blind" (2022)
- "Seasons Out of Time" (2023)
- "Pretty Good Neighbor" (2023)
- "The Pandemonium Waltz" (2023)
- "The Adherence" (2024)
- "Gate 9" (2024)
- "The Visitation" (2024)
- "Emergency on Floor 2" (2024)
- “Mabuse’s Last Scheme” (2024)

=== Curiosities columns in The Magazine of Fantasy & Science Fiction ===
Source:

=== Nonfiction ===
- Introduction to Carlos Hernandez's short story collection The Assimilated Cuban's Guide to Quantum Santeria, January 2016
- Introduction to Anna Tambour's short story collection The Finest Ass in the Universe, Ticonderoga Publications, July 2015
- Introduction to the Clarion Class of 2012's short story anthology The Red Volume, awkwardrobots.org, August 2014
- Introduction to Michael Cisco's novel The Traitor, Cenitpede Press, 2012.
- Introduction to Ekaterina Sedia's short story collection Moscow, But Dreaming, Prime Books, 2012.
- Introduction to John Langan's short story collection The Wide Carnivorous Sky, Hippocampus Press, 2013.
- Introduction to David Herter's novel October Dark, Earthling Books, November 2009.
- Introduction to Robert Wexler's novel The Painting and the City, PS Publishing, UK, 2008.
- Essay on "The Metaphysics of Fiction Writing" included in the end matter of the story collection The Drowned Life, 2008.
- Essay on "Anatomy of Sleep" by Shelley Jackson for online magazine Heliotrope, Fall 2007.
- Essay "I Love a Mystery" for LitBlog Co-op site, May 4, 2006.
- Introduction to Richard Bowes' story collection Streetcar Dreams, PS Publishing, UK, 2006.
- Essay on "Lull" by Kelly Link for online magazine Fantastic Metropolis, January 1, 2005.
- Introduction to John Gardner's Grendel, Fantasy Masterworks Series #41, Gollancz, UK, 2004
- Introduction to Jeff VanderMeer's story collection Secret Life, Golden Gryphon Press, 2004.
- Essay on "The Man Upstairs" by Ray Bradbury for Fantastic Metropolis, December 27, 2004.
- Essay on "The Friends of the Friends" by Henry James for Fantastic Metropolis, December 24, 2004.
- Essay on "The Hell Screen" by Akutagawa Ryunosuke, Fantastic Metropolis, December 21, 2004.
- Introduction to Lucius Shepard's short novel Floater, PS Publishing, UK, 2003.
- Curiosities Column, The Magazine of Fantasy & Science Fiction, on The Other Side of the Mountain by Michel Bernanos, June 2000.
- Curiosities Column, The Magazine of Fantasy & Science Fiction, on Katter Murr by E. T. A. Hoffmann, April 1999.
