= Death Stalks the Night =

Short story collection by Hugh B. Cave

- Dust-jacket from the first edition
- Author: Hugh B. Cave
- Illustrator: Lee Brown Coye
- Cover artist: Alan M. Clark
- Language: English
- Genre: Fantasy, horror and mystery
- Publisher: Fedogan & Bremer
- Publication date: 1995
- Publication place: United States
- Media type: Print (hardback)
- Pages: xiii, 569
- ISBN: 1-878252-15-1
- OCLC: 33812266
- Dewey Decimal: 813/.52 20
- LC Class: PS3505.A912 D43 1995

Death Stalks the Night is a collection of fantasy, horror, and mystery short stories by American writer Hugh B. Cave. It was originally to have been the fifth volume published by Carcosa, the North Carolina joint publishing venture founded by Karl Edward Wagner, Jim Groce and David Drake. However, Lee Brown Coye, who was completing the illustrations for the volume, died, stalling its publication by Carcosa.

It was eventually released in 1995, including the completed illustrations by Coye, through Fedogan & Bremer in an edition of 2,000 copies, of which 100 were signed by the author. The stories originally appeared in the magazines Dime Mystery Magazine, Terror Tales, Spicy-Adventure Stories, New Mystery Adventures, Super-Detective Stories, Spicy Mystery Stories, Horror Stories, Detective Short Stories and Star Detective Magazine.

== Contents ==
- Foreword
- Introduction, by Karl Edward Wagner
- "Modern Nero"
- "Death’s Loving Arms"
- "The Crawling Ones"
- "The Pain Room"
- "The Flame Fiend"
- "Unholy Night!"
- "Dark Slaughter"
- "The Corpse Crypt"
- "Mistress of the Dead"
- "Terror Island"
- "Satan’s Mistress"
- "Tomb for the Living"
- "Death Holds for Ransom"
- "My Pupil—The Idiot!"
- "Death Calls from the Madhouse"
- "Death’s Door"
- "Death Stalks the Night"

== Sources ==
- Brown, Charles N.; William G. Contento. "The Locus Index to Science Fiction (1984-1998)".
- Chalker, Jack L.; Mark Owings (1998). The Science-Fantasy Publishers: A Bibliographic History, 1923-1998. Westminster, MD and Baltimore: Mirage Press, Ltd. pp. 253–254.
