= Worse Things Waiting =

- Dust-jacket from the first edition
- Author: Manly Wade Wellman
- Illustrator: Lee Brown Coye
- Cover artist: Lee Brown Coye
- Language: English
- Genre: Fantasy, horror
- Publisher: Carcosa
- Publication date: 1973
- Publication place: United States
- Media type: Print (hardback)
- Pages: xii, 353
- ISBN: 0-913796-00-X
- OCLC: 1469816

Worse Things Waiting is a collection of fantasy and horror short stories by American writer Manly Wade Wellman, with illustrations by Lee Brown Coye. It was released in 1973 by Carcosa in an edition of 2,867 copies, of which 536 pre-ordered copies were signed by the author and artist. Many of the stories originally appeared in the magazines Weird Tales, Strange Stories, Unknown, and Fantasy and Science Fiction.

Several of the stories in Worst Things Waiting, such as "The Valley Was Still" and "Coven", deal with soldiers in the American Civil War (both Unionist and Confederate) who encounter supernatural phenomena. Three of the narratives - "Warrior in Darkness", "Young-Man-With-Skull-At-His-Ear" and "The Hairy Thunderer" - feature Native American characters.

== Awards ==
- 1975, World Fantasy Award, Best Collection/Anthology.

== Reception ==
E. F. Bleiler, discussing Worse Things Waiting, wrote: "An uneven collection, some of the earlier material being not too strong. But there are also many good stories which rank among the genre literature of the period."

== Contents ==
Foreword by the author

- "The White Road" (poem)

PAGES FROM A MEMORY BOOK

- "Up Under the Roof"
- "Among Those Present"
- "The Terrible Parchment"
- "Come Into My Parlor"
- "Frogfather"
- "Sin’s Doorway"
- "The Undead Soldier"

GRAY VOICES

- "The Pineys"
- "The Kelpie"
- "Changeling"
- "The Devil Is Not Mocked"
- "For Fear of Little Men"
- "'Where Angels Fear...'"
- "The Witch’s Cat"
- "School for the Unspeakable"
- "Warrior in Darkness"
- "Dhoh"
- "Larroes Catch Meddlers"

THE NIGHT SIDE OF HISTORY

- "Voice in a Veteran’s Ear"
- "These Doth the Lord Hate"
- "The Liers in Wait"
- "Young-Man-With-Skull-At-His-Ear"
- "The Hairy Thunderer"
- "The Song of the Slaves"
- "When It Was Moonlight"
- "His Name on a Bullet"
- "The Valley Was Still"

LONGER IN THE TELLING

- "Fearful Rock"
- "Coven"
