= Lee Brown Coye =

American artist

- Lee Brown Coye
- Born: July 24, 1907; Syracuse, New York
- Died: September 5, 1981 (aged 74)

Lee Brown Coye (July 24, 1907 – September 5, 1981) was an American artist.

Coye is probably best remembered for his black-and-white illustrations for pulp magazines and horror fiction, but he produced a variety of works in other media.

== Biography ==
Coye was born in Syracuse, New York, and as a young man lived in nearby Tully. He spent his entire life in the Central New York area.

He and his wife, Ruth, lived in Syracuse for many years where Coye's activities included teaching adult art classes; working under the Works Progress Administration to paint a mural in the Cazenovia High School in 1934 (since destroyed); advertising for the WSYR Broadcasting System in upstate New York, producing a variety of commissioned works.

The Coyes settled in Hamilton, New York, in 1959 when Lee went to work for Sculptura, a small company that reproduced antique sculptures. The move to Hamilton allowed Coye to fulfill his ambition of returning to a small town and maintaining his own art studio.

Coye was almost entirely self-taught as an artist, and his entire life was devoted to art-related work. As a young man, he attended one semester of night art classes, but his artistic knowledge and abilities came from many years of work and a thorough study of nature. His astute knowledge of body parts developed from his studies of anatomy and his work as a medical illustrator. He spent time attending operations and autopsies, thus becoming extremely familiar with the human body assembled or not.

== Recurring motifs ==
One recurring feature in Coye's work is the motif of wooden sticks, often in latticework-like patterns. This was inspired by a 1938 discovery in an abandoned farmhouse.

Coye had returned to the North Pitcher, New York, area where he spent much of his childhood. While wandering deep in the woods, Coye discovered an abandoned farmhouse. Boards and pieces of wood which had been set perpendicular to one another surrounded the site. Neither inside nor out could Coye find an explanation for the presence of these crossed sticks. In the years following, Coye remained interested in the significance of his discovery.

When Coye returned to the site in 1963, there was nothing left of the building or the sticks (the area had suffered severe flooding), and he never found out why the sticks were there or who it was that had arranged them in such a manner. Because of the strangeness of the entire experience, these forms never left Coye, and they appear in many of his paintings and illustrations.

The incident also inspired Coye's friend Karl Edward Wagner to write the award-winning story "Sticks". A four-page portfolio of Coye's work accompanies the printing of Wagner's story in Gahan Wilson, ed. First World Fantasy Awards. NY: Doubleday, 1977, (between pages 168 and 169).

The crescent moon was an early Coye motif in paintings and illustrations. The whale became a later signature motif. Coye fashioned wooden sculptures, silver pendants and pins, engravings, drawings, and a large painting of the whale. One very fine example is in the Morrisville State College Library collection the 3-foot-long (0.91 m) pine "Moby-Dick" sculpture created in 1965.

== Illustrator of the macabre ==
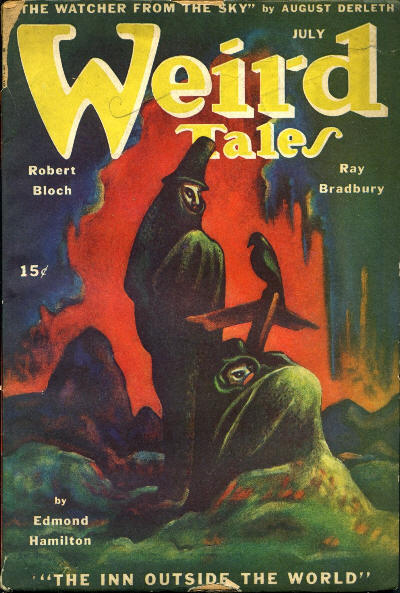
Coye's cover for the Weird Tales

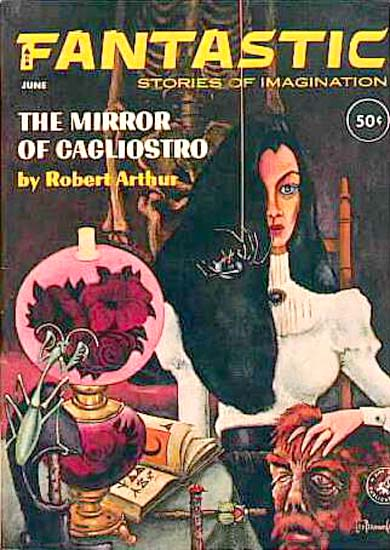
Coye provided the cover for Robert Arthur's "The Mirror of Cagliostro " on the June 1963 issue of Fantastic

Coye's fame as an illustrator of the macabre developed as a result of his drawings for three horror anthologies edited by August Derleth in the early 1940s, Sleep No More (1944), Who Knocks (1946), and The Night Side (1947). This subsequently led to additional work for Weird Tales, a popular pulp magazine. Coye's work first appeared in the March 1945 issue of Weird Tales, illustrating the story 'Please Go Way and Let Me Sleep" by Helen Kasson. This tale gave Coye the chance to show dead bodies in various states of decomposition. From 1945 to 1952, his covers and interior work, in a long and fruitful association with the magazine, captured images of horror and the supernatural. A review of Pulp Macabre: The Art of Lee Brown Coye's Final and Darkest Hour said his work for Weird Tales produced "some of the magazine's greatest covers and as well as some of the most memorable illustrations to ever appear in pulps". In the 1960s, Coye's work appeared in such magazines as Fantastic and Amazing.

Coye illustrated, as well as the H. P. Lovecraft collection, Three Tales of Horror (Arkham House, 1967), and two deluxe collections of pulp stories edited by Karl Edward Wagner and published by his imprint Carcosa: Manly Wade Wellman's Worse Things Waiting (1975) and Hugh B. Cave's Murgunstrumm and Others (1978). Coye won the World Fantasy Award for best artist in 1975 and 1978. Coye was in the midst of illustrating Cave's volume Death Stalks the Night, which would have been the fifth volume published by North Carolina publishing house Carcosa, when he suffered a crippling stroke and eventually died. The volume's editor, Karl Edward Wagner, abandoned plans to publish through Carcosa, however the volume was eventually issued, with the illustrations Coye had completed, by Fedogan and Bremer.

== Other work ==
Coye's artistic work covered much more than pulp illustrations and featured diverse inspirations, including nature, animals and mythology. He painted in watercolor, oil, and egg tempera; created murals, sculpture and photography; worked as a silversmith and made models or dioramas. His work was known for craftsmanship, humor and originality. Though known for his macabre magazine art, Coye also created paintings, sculpture, and jewelry noted for beauty and delicacy. Image of Night Side cover Coye exhibited at the Whitney Museum and the Metropolitan Museum of Art. His work is represented in numerous collections including the Metropolitan Museum of Art in New York, the Everson Museum in Syracuse, the Onondaga County Historical Society, Picker Art Gallery at Colgate University, the Morrisville State College Library, SUNY Oswego, Syracuse University, and private collections.

From 1960 to 1964, Coye published a regular column titled "Chips and Shavings" in the Mid-York Weekly newspaper. In 2015 a collection of these columns were read by Coye's son Robert as an LP record in 2015, titled Where Is Abby? & Other Tales. One of Coye's "Chips and Shavings" articles was published in First World Fantasy Awards (1977)

The book Pulp Macabre: The Art of Lee Brown Coye's Final and Darkest Era was published in 2015. Focused on collecting and reprinting Coye's pulp illustrations, the book also features essays and biographical sketches. Editors of the book, described Coye's illustrations as "whimsical and cartoonish" at first glance but "spine-chilling" with a closer look.

Coy's multi-panel mural depicting regional history is displayed in the lobby of the Hamilton, New York post office as of 2010.

== Sources ==
This article is based on "Lee Brown Coye:Illustrator and Artist", The Mage, Summer 1985. It is used and updated with permission of the copyright owner. Additional material is from Bill Drew.

- Tammra Rayfield, "Lee Brown Coye: Illustrator and Artist, The Mage, Summer 1985 with material added by Bill Drew
- Bill Drew, Associate Librarian, Morrisville College, Morrisville, NY, interview with Lee Brown Coye
