= Hugh B. Cave =

American writer (1910–2004)

- Hugh B. Cave, date unknown
- Born: 11 July 1910; Chester, England
- Died: 27 June 2004 (aged 93); Vero Beach, Florida, U.S.
- Occupation: Author
- Writing career
- Pen name: Justin Case, John Star, Geoffrey Vace
- Genres: Science fiction, Horror
- Subject: Horror

Hugh Barnett Cave (11 July 1910 – 27 June 2004) was an American writer of various genres, perhaps best remembered for his works of horror, weird menace and science fiction. Cave was one of the most prolific contributors to American pulp magazines of the 1920s and 1930s, selling an estimated 800 stories not only in the aforementioned genres but also in western, fantasy, adventure, crime, romance and non-fiction. He used a variety of pen names, including Justin Case, the name under which he created the antihero The Eel. A war correspondent during World War II, Cave afterwards settled in Jamaica where he owned and managed a coffee plantation and continued his writing career, now specializing in novels as well as fiction and non-fiction sales to mainstream magazines.

Starting in the 1970s Cave enjoyed a resurgence in popularity when Karl Edward Wagner's Carcosa Press published Murgunstrumm and Others, the first hardcover collection of Cave's pulp stories. Cave relocated to Florida and regularly published original material until about the year 2000, and won a World Fantasy Award for lifetime achievement in 1999.

== Biography ==
Born in Chester, England, Hugh B. Cave relocated during his childhood with his family to Boston, Massachusetts, soon after the beginning of World War I. His first name was in honor of Hugh Walpole, a favorite author of his mother, a nurse, who had once known Rudyard Kipling.

Cave attended Brookline High School. After graduating, Cave attended Boston University on a scholarship but had to leave when his father was severely injured. He worked initially for a self-publishing press, the only regular job he would ever have. He quit this position at age 20 to write for a living.

From 1932 until his death in 1997, Cave corresponded extensively with fellow pulp writer Carl Richard Jacobi. Selections of this correspondence can be found in Cave's memoir Magazines I Remember. During the 1930s, Cave lived in Pawtucket, Rhode Island, but he never met H.P. Lovecraft, who lived in nearby Providence. The two engaged in a debate by correspondence (non-extant) regarding the ethics and aesthetics of writing for the pulp magazines. At least two of Cave's stories are associated with Lovecraft's Cthulhu Mythos – "The Isle of Dark Magic" and "The Death Watch".

During World War II Cave travelled as a reporter around the Pacific Ocean area and in Southeast Asia. Soon after the war he relocated to the Caribbean area, spending five years in Haiti, after which he rebuilt and managed a successful coffee plantation in Jamaica. He returned to the United States during the early 1970s after the Jamaican government confiscated his plantation.

Hugh Cave was married twice, first to Margaret Long in a union that produced two sons before the couple began living apart, and to Peggy (or Peggie) Thompson, who died during 2001.

Cave was 93 when he died in Vero Beach, Florida, on 27 June 2004. His remains were cremated.

== Legacy ==
A biography of Cave entitled Pulp Man's Odyssey: The Hugh B. Cave Story by Audrey Parente was published by Starmont House (Mercer Island, WA) in 1987.

== Writing career ==
Sources differ as to when Cave sold his first story: some say it was "I Name Thee, Cave" while he still attended Brookline High School, others cite "Island Ordeal", written at age 19 during 1929 while still working for the self-publishing press.

During his early career he contributed to such pulp magazines as Astounding, Black Mask, and Weird Tales. By his own estimate, during the 1930s alone, he published approximately 800 short stories in nearly 100 periodicals using various pseudonyms, such as James Pitt and Margaret Hullinwall. Cave was noted especially for his horror fiction: Stefan Dziemianowicz wrote in the St. James Guide to Horror, Ghost and Gothic Writers, that Cave "transformed rural American towns into Gothic landscapes, local powerbrokers into megalomaniacal fiends." Of particular interest during this time was his series featuring an independent gentleman of courageous action and questionable morals known simply as The Eel. These adventures were published during the late 1930s and early 40s with the pseudonym Justin Case. Cave was also one of the most successful contributors to the weird menace or "shudder pulps" of the 1930s.

During 1943, drawing on his experience as a war reporter, he authored one of his best-regarded works, Long Were The Nights, telling of the first PT boats at Guadalcanal. He also wrote a number of other books about the war in the Pacific area during this period.

During his post-war sojourn in Haiti, he became so familiar with the religion of Voodoo that he published Haiti: High Road to Adventure, a nonfiction work acclaimed critically as the "best report on voodoo in English." His Caribbean experiences resulted in his best-selling Voodoo-themed novel, The Cross on the Drum (1959), an interracial story in which a white Christian missionary becomes enamored of a black Voodoo priest's sister. Reviewing The Cross on the Drum, for The New York Times Book Review, Seldon Rodman noted, it treats both the country and its African religious cult with profound sympathy.

During this midpoint in his career Cave advanced his writing to the "slick" magazines, including Collier's, Family Circle, Ladies' Home Journal, Redbook, and the Saturday Evening Post. It was in this latter publication, during 1959, that "The Mission," his most popular short story, was published—- issued subsequently in hardcover format by Doubleday company, reprinted in textbooks, and translated into a number of languages.

According to The Guardian, during the 1970s, with the golden era of pulp fiction now in the past, Cave's "only regular market was writing romance for women's magazines." He was rediscovered, however, by Karl Edward Wagner, who published Murgunstrumm and Others, a horror story collection that won Cave the 1978 World Fantasy Award. Other collections followed and Cave also published new horror fiction.

His later career included the publication during the late 1970s and early 1980s of four fantasy novels: Legion of the Dead (1979), The Nebulon Horror (1980), The Evil (1981), and Shades of Evil (1982). Other late works include Lucifer's Eye (1991) and The Mountains of Madness (2004). Moreover, Cave adapted to the internet, championing the e-book to such an extent that electronic versions of his stories can be purchased readily online.

During his entire career he composed more than 1,000 short stories in nearly all genres (though he is remembered best for his horror and crime pieces), approximately forty novels, and a notable body of nonfiction. He received the Phoenix Award as well as lifetime achievement awards from the International Horror Guild, the Horror Writers Association, and the World Fantasy Convention.

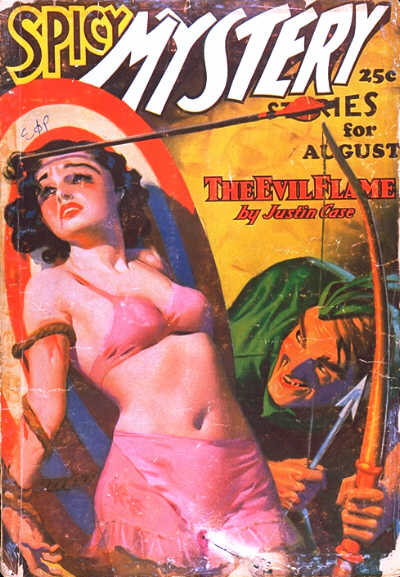
As "Justin Case", Cave wrote the cover story in the August 1936 Spicy Mystery Stories.

=== Novels ===
- Fishermen Four; an Outdoor Adventure Story (1942)
- Drums of Revolt (1957)
- The Cross on the Drum (1959)
- Black Sun (1960)
- The Mission (1960)
- Run, Shadow, Run (1968)
- Larks Will Sing (1969)
- Legion of the Dead (1979)
- The Nebulon Horror (1980)
- The Evil (1981)
- Shades of Evil (1982)
- Disciples of Dread (1988)
- Uncharted Voyage (1989)
- The Lower Deep (1990)
- Lucifer's Eye (1991)
- Isle of the Whisperers (1999)
- The Dawning (2000)
- The Evil Returns (2001)
- The Restless Dead (2002)
- The Mountains of Madness (2004)
- Serpents in the Sun (2011)

=== Collections ===
- The Witching Lands; Tales of the West Indies (1962)
- Murgunstrumm and Others (1977)
- The Corpse Maker (1988)
- Death Stalks the Night (1995)
- Bitter/Sweet (1996)
- The Dagger of Tsiang and Other Tales of Adventure (1997)
- Escapades of the Eel (1997)
- The Door Below (1997)
- Bottled in Blonde; the Peter Kane Detective Stories (2000)
- The Lady Wore Black, and Other Weird Cat Tails (2000)
- Long Live the Dead; Tales from Black Mask (Crippen & Landru, 2000)
- Officer Coffey Stories (2000)
- Come into My Parlor; Tales from Detective Fiction Weekly (Crippen & Landru, 2002)
- House of the Restless Dead and Other Stories (2011)
- Devils in the Dark: Terror Trios Featuring Hugh B. Cave (2012)
- The Complete Cases of Peter Kane (2018)

=== Juveniles ===
- The Voyage (1988)
- Conquering Kilmarnie (1989)

=== Short stories ===
- "Two were left"
- "The Corpse on the Grating" (1930)
- "The Strange Case of No. 7" (1930)
- "The Murder Machine" (1930)
- "The Affair of the Clutching Hand" (1931)
- "The Door of Doom" (1931)
- "Murgunstrumm" (1932)
- "The Ghoul Gallery" (1932)
- "The Brotherhood of Blood" (1932)
- "Stragella" (1932)
- "Spawn of Inferno" (1932)
- "The City of Crawling Death" (1932)
- "The Infernal Shadow" (1932)
- "The Watcher in the Green Room" (1933)
- "Dead Man's Belt" (1933)
- "The Crawling Curse" (1933)
- "The Cult of the White Ape" (1933)
- "Dark Slaughter" (1933)
- "The Black Gargoyle" (1934)
- "The Prophecy" (1934)
- "The Isle of Dark Magic" (1934)
- "The Grisly Death" (1934)
- "Death's Loving Arms" (1934)
- "The Pain Room" (1934)
- "Unholy Night!" (1934)
- "The Corpse Crypt" (1934)
- "Terror Island" (1934)
- "Horror in Wax" (1935)
- "Maxon's Mistress" (1935)
- "The Flame Fiend" (1935)
- "Mistress of the Dead" (1935)
- "Satan's Mistress" (1935)
- "Death Holds for Ransom" (1935)
- "Death Calls from the Madhouse" (1935)
- "Death Stalks the Night" (1935)
- "Imp of Satan" (1935)
- "Prey of the Nightborn" (1936)
- "The Evil Flame" (1936)
- "Modern Nero" (1936)
- "The Crawling Ones" (1936)
- "Doom Door" (1936)
- "Disturb Not the Dead" (1936)
- "The Strange Death of Ivan Gromleigh" (1937)
- "Tomb for the Living" (1937)
- "My Pupil-the Idiot!" (1937)
- "The Red Trail to Zanzibar" (1938)
- "Six Were Slain" (1938)
- "Servant of Satan" (1938)
- "The Death Watch" (1939)
- "Boomerang" (1939)
- "Black Bondage" (1939)
- "Death's Door" (1940)
- "The Hostage" (1940)
- "Beneath the Vapor Veil" (1941)
- "The Thirsty Thing" (1941)
- "The Whisperers" (1942)
- "Purr of a Cat" (1942) (as Justin Case)
- "The Caverns of Time" (1942)
- "Calavan" (1942)
- "The Thing from the Swamp" (1942)
- "Tomorrow is Forever" (1943)
- "The Red Trail to Zanzibar" (1950) (as John Starr)
- "Many Happy Returns" (1966)
- "The Sandmaker's Door" (1969)
- "Ladies in Waiting" (1975)
- "From the Lower Deep" (1979)
- "The Door Below" (1981)
- "A Place of No Return" (1981)
- "Always Together" (1982)
- "One to Chicago" (1983)
- "What Say the Frogs Now, Jenny?" (1983)
- "Final Game" (1983)
- "Just the Two of Us" (1984)
- "Damballa's Slough" (1984)
- "Of Time and Space" (1985)
- "Damsels for the Damned" (1985)
- "Of Time & Space" (1985)
- "After the Funeral" (1986)
- "The Corpse-Maker" (1988)
- "The House of Evil" (1988)
- "The Barricade" (1988)
- "Disturb Not the Dead" (1988)
- "The Thing from the Swamp" (1988)
- "My Pupil – The Idiot!" (1988)
- "The Hard-Luck Kid" (1992)
- "The Mountains of Time" (1993)
- "Mission to Margal" (1993)
- "Another Kind of Enchanted Cottage" (1993)
- "Don't Open the Door!" (1994)
- "The Kutting Edge" (1994) (as Justin Case)
- "Gordie's Pets" (1994)
- "A Honeymoon to Remember" (1994)
- "The Whisperers" (1994)
- "Chernick" (1994)
- "Just Another H.P.L. Horror Story" (1994)
- "Vanishing Point" (1994)
- "Genesis II" (1994)
- "A Dying at Blackwater" (1995)
- "Forever Is a Long Long Time" (1995)
- "The Law" (1995)
- "First Love" (1995)
- "Nights in the Mountains of Haiti" (1995)
- "Five to Get Ready, Two to Go" (1996)
- "The Blade and the Claw" (1996)
- "By Heaven!" (1996)
- "Aiyana and the Gallant Rider" (1996)
- "...And Out" (1997)
- "A Gift of Magic" (1997)
- "The Second Time Around" (1997)
- "Inside the Earth, Under the Sea" (1999)
- "A Voice in the Wild" (1999)

=== Nonfiction ===
- Long Were the Nights; the Saga of PT Squadron "X" in the Solomons (1943)
- "The Fightin'est Ship"; the Story of the Cruiser "Helena" (1944) (with C. G. Morris)
- We Build, We Fight! The Story of the Seabees (1944)
- I Took the Sky Road (1945) (with Norman Mickey Miller)
- Wings Across the World; the Story of the Air Transport Command (1945)
- Haiti, Highroad to Adventure (1952)
- Four Paths to Paradise; a Book About Jamaica (1961)
- Magazines I Remember; Some Pulps, Their Editors, and What It Was Like to Write for Them (1994)

== See also ==
- List of horror fiction authors

== Sources ==
- Cave, Hugh B., Escapades of the Eel, Chicago: Tattered Pages Press, 1977 (ISBN 1-884449-06-9)
- Dill, Timothy Ray, "An Interview with Hugh Cave" (PDF), Pulp Fiction Monthly, January 1997
- The FictionMags Index
- Parente, Audrey., Pulp Man's Odyssey: The Hugh B. Cave Story, [Mercer Island, WA] Starmont House, Inc., 1988
- The Phoenix Award
- "Published Pulp Stories by Hugh B. Cave" at Black Mask Magazine
- Williams, John, "Hugh B. Cave: Author of horror, crime, fantasy and adventure from pulp fiction's golden era", obituary in the Guardian, 10 July 2004.
