= Occult detective fiction =

Crossover between mystery and fantasy or horror fiction

Occult detective Carnacki inspecting the "queer, soft, flabby, spreading foot-print" of an apparent ghost, in the 1910 story "The Searcher of the End House"

Occult detective fiction is a subgenre of detective fiction that combines the tropes of the main genre with those of supernatural, fantasy and/or horror fiction. Unlike the traditional detective who investigates murder and other common crimes, the occult detective is employed in cases involving ghosts, demons, curses, magic, vampires, undead, monsters and other supernatural elements. Some occult detectives are portrayed as being psychic or in possession of other paranormal or magical powers.

== History ==
=== Literature ===
Fitz James O'Brien's character Harry Escott is a contender for first occult detective in fiction. A specialist in supernatural phenomena, Escott investigates a ghost in "The Pot of Tulips" (1855) and an invisible entity in "What Was It? A Mystery" (1859). The narrator of Edward Bulwer-Lytton's novella "The Haunted and the Haunters; or, The House and the Brain" (1859) is another student of the supernatural who probes a mystery involving a culprit with paranormal abilities. Sheridan Le Fanu's Dr. Martin Hesselius appeared in "Green Tea" (1869) and later became a framing device for Le Fanu's short story collection In a Glass Darkly (1872).

For most of its plot, The Hound of the Baskervilles, one of Sherlock Holmes's best-known adventures, seems to belong in this genre. However, by the story's end, the villain turns out to be completely human and mundane and to have deliberately created the misleading impression of a supernatural being.

The next prominent figure in this tradition was Dr. Abraham Van Helsing in Bram Stoker's Dracula (1897), followed closely by E. and H. Heron's Flaxman Low, featured in a series of stories in Pearson's Magazine (1898–99), Algernon Blackwood's Dr. John Silence, and William Hope Hodgson's Carnacki the Ghost Finder. Other supernatural sleuths in fiction dating to the late nineteenth century include Alice and Claude Askew's Aylmer Vance and Champion de Crespigny's Norton Vyse.

Thomas Carnacki may well be considered one of the first true occult detectives, as he combined both knowledge and experience of what he calls "the ab-natural" with scientific deductive method and equipment. The adventures of Carnacki have been continued by a number of writers, including A. F. Kidd in collaboration with Rick Kennett in 472 Cheyne Walk: Carnacki, the Untold Stories (2000), William Meikle in Carnacki: Heaven and Hell (Colusa, CA: Ghost House Press, 2011), Brandon Barrows in The Castle-Town Tragedy (Dunhams Manor, 2016), and others. In addition, writers Joshua M Reynolds and John Linwood Grant have each produced a separate series of stories which follow on from Carnacki's death, and feature occult detectives whose work relates to the original tales—The Adventures of the Royal Occultist and Tales of the Last Edwardian respectively.

Sax Rohmer's collection The Dream Detective features the occult detective Moris Klaw, who utilises "odic force" in his investigations. The occultist Dion Fortune made her contribution to the genre with The Secrets of Dr Taverner (1926), consisting of psychic adventures of the Holmes-like Taverner as narrated by his assistant, Dr Rhodes. Aleister Crowley's Simon Iff featured in a series of stories, some of which have been collected in book form. Dennis Wheatley's occult detective was Neils Orsen.

In Poland, Włodzimierz Bełcikowski created two stories—W walce ze Złotym Smokiem [In Battle with Golden Dragon] (1925) and Tajemnica wiecznego życia [The Secret of Eternal Life] (1926)—about William Talmes (a character inspired by Sherlock Holmes but possessing also occult/parapsychic powers and the skills of an inventor) battling a murderous oriental sect and a psychic vampire from Atlantis.

Though never large, the occult detective subgenre grew to include such writers as Seabury Quinn (with his character Jules de Grandin); Manly Wade Wellman, whose characters Judge Pursuivant and John Thunstone investigated occult events through short stories in the pulps, collected in The Third Cry to Legba and Other Invocations (2000) and in the novels What Dreams May Come (1983) and The School of Darkness (1985); and "Jack Mann" (E. C. Vivian), who chronicled the adventure of his occult detective Gregory Gordon George Green, known as "Gees", in a series of novels. Pulp writer Robert E. Howard created stories about Steve Harrison, an occult detective, in the Strange Detective Stories magazine. Margery Lawrence created the character Miles Pennoyer in her occult detective stories collected in Number Seven, Queer Street.

Modern writers who have used the occult detective theme as a basis for supernatural adventures include Peter Saxon (The Guardians series), John Burke (Dr Alex Caspian), Frank Lauria (Dr Owen Orient), Lin Carter (Anton Zarnak), William Massa (Occult Assassin, The Paranormalist, Shadow Detective, Spirit Breakers) and Joseph Payne Brennan (Lucius Leffing).

The occult detective theme has also been used with series characters devised by such contemporary writers as Douglas Adams (Dirk Gently), F. Paul Wilson (the Repairman Jack series), Steve Rasnic Tem (Charlie Goode), Jessica Amanda Salmonson (Miss Penelope Pettiweather), David Rowlands (Father O'Connor), Rick Kennett (Ernie Pine), Brian Lumley (Titus Crow), Robert Weinberg (Sydney Taine), Simon R. Green (John Taylor), Steve Niles (Cal McDonald), Mike Carey (Felix Castor), Mike Mignola (Joe Golem), Mercedes Lackey (Diana Tregarde), Laurell K. Hamilton (Anita Blake), Brian Keene (Levi Stoltzfus), Jonathan L. Howard (Johannes Cabal), Brandon Barrows (Azuma Kuromori), Jonathan Maberry (Sam Hunter), and Guillermo del Toro and Chuck Hogan (Hugo Blackwood). Jim Butcher's best-selling book series The Dresden Files is another well-known example, as is Derek Landy's Skulduggery Pleasant series. Randall Garrett's Lord Darcy stories and Dean Koontz's The Haunted Earth are examples in which occult detectives operate in a world where the occult is simply an accepted part of mundane life. Assaph Mehr's Stories of Togas, Daggers, and Magic combine historical mystery detective in ancient Rome with fantasy and occult elements.

A useful recent anthology collecting specimens of the genre is Mark Valentine, ed., The Black Veil & Other Tales of Supernatural Sleuths (ISBN 978-1-84022-088-9), published by Wordsworth Editions in 2009. Earlier themed anthologies include Stephen Jones, ed., Dark Detectives: Adventures of the Supernatural Sleuths (Fedogan & Bremer, 1998) and Peter Haining, ed., Supernatural Sleuths: Stories of Occult Investigators (William Kimber, 1986).

The magazine Occult Detective Quarterly (Electric Pentacle Press, 2016) specialises in presenting a wide range of new occult detective tales set in a range of time periods, with the occasional pastiche of classic figures from this branch of fiction. ODQ moved to Ulthar Press in 2017. On the tragic death of Sam Gafford of Ulthar Press, it was decided that editors John Linwood Grant and Dave Brzeski would continue the magazine under the revised title of Occult Detective Magazine from #6 onward. It is now published by Cathaven Press in the UK. It seemed somehow fitting that refugees from Ulthar should go to Cathaven.

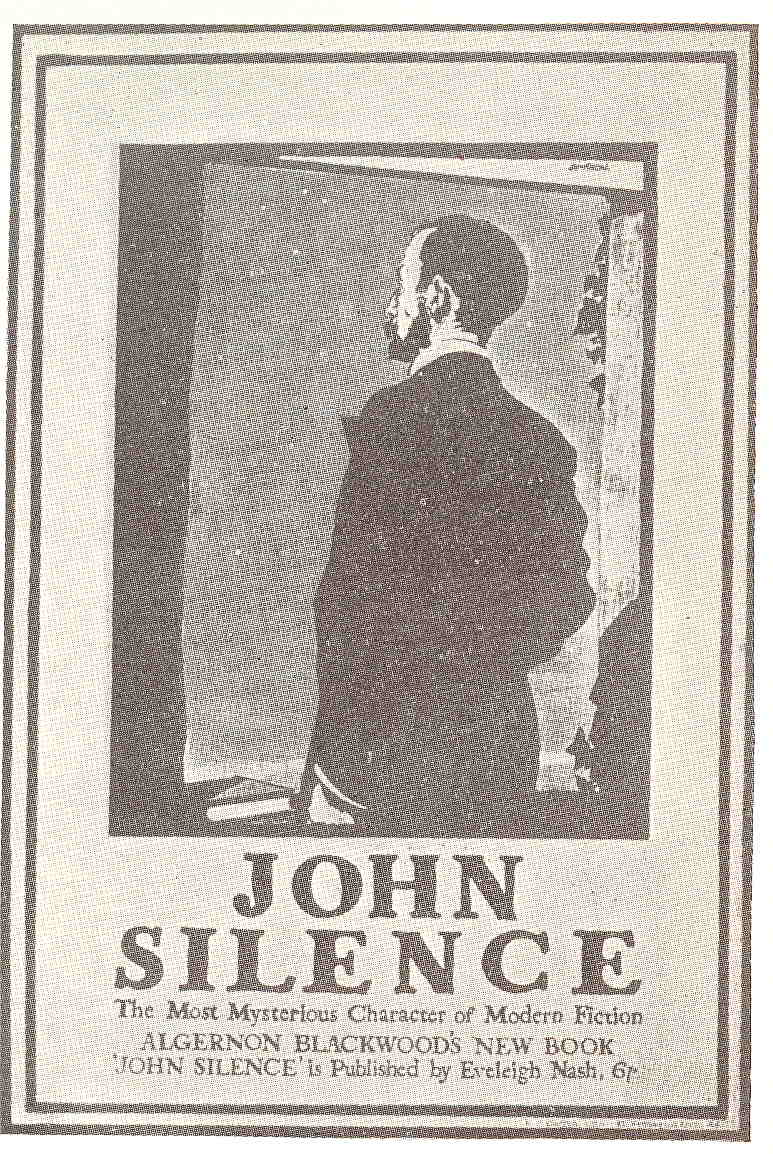
Algernon Blackwood's Dr. John Silence

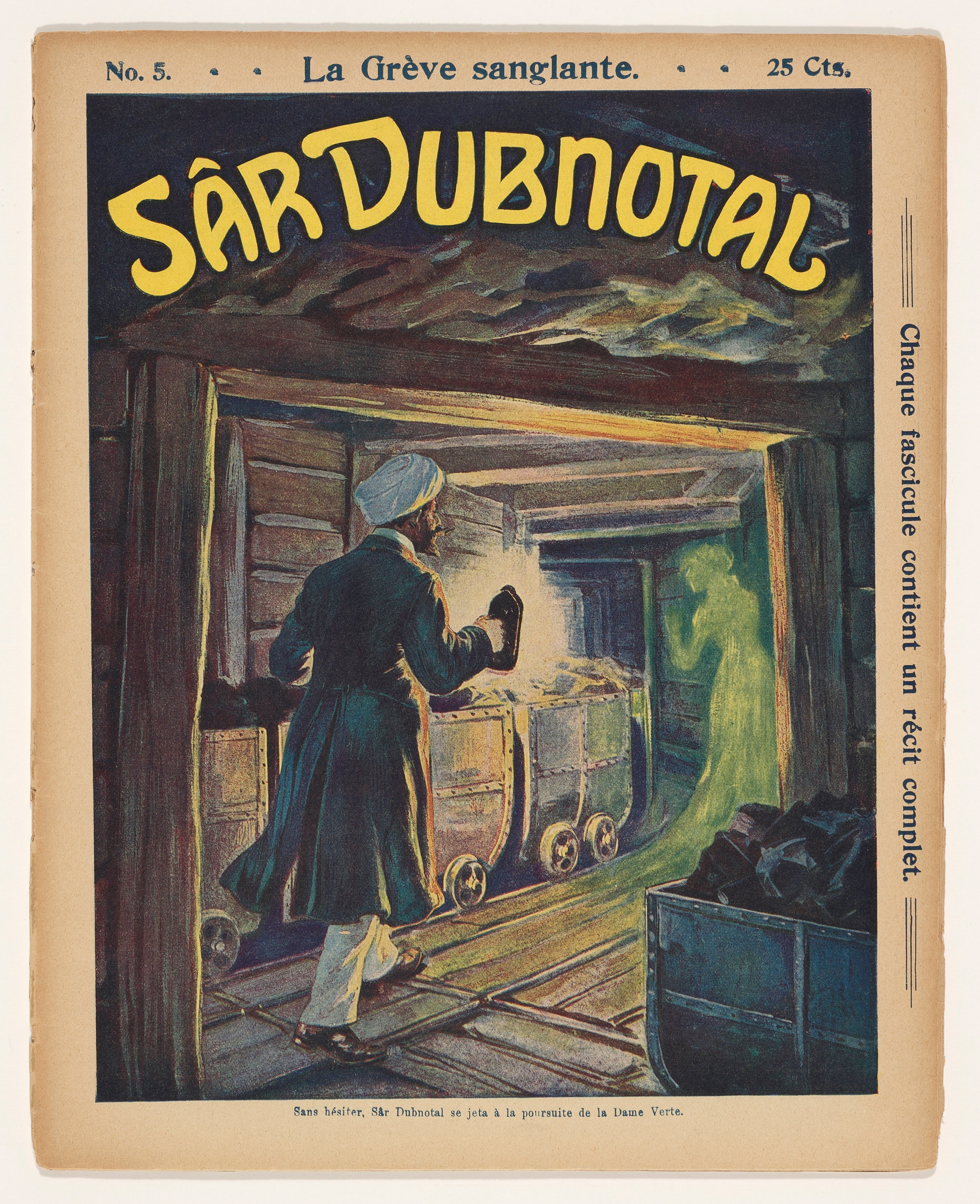
Norbert Sevestre's Sâr Dubnotal

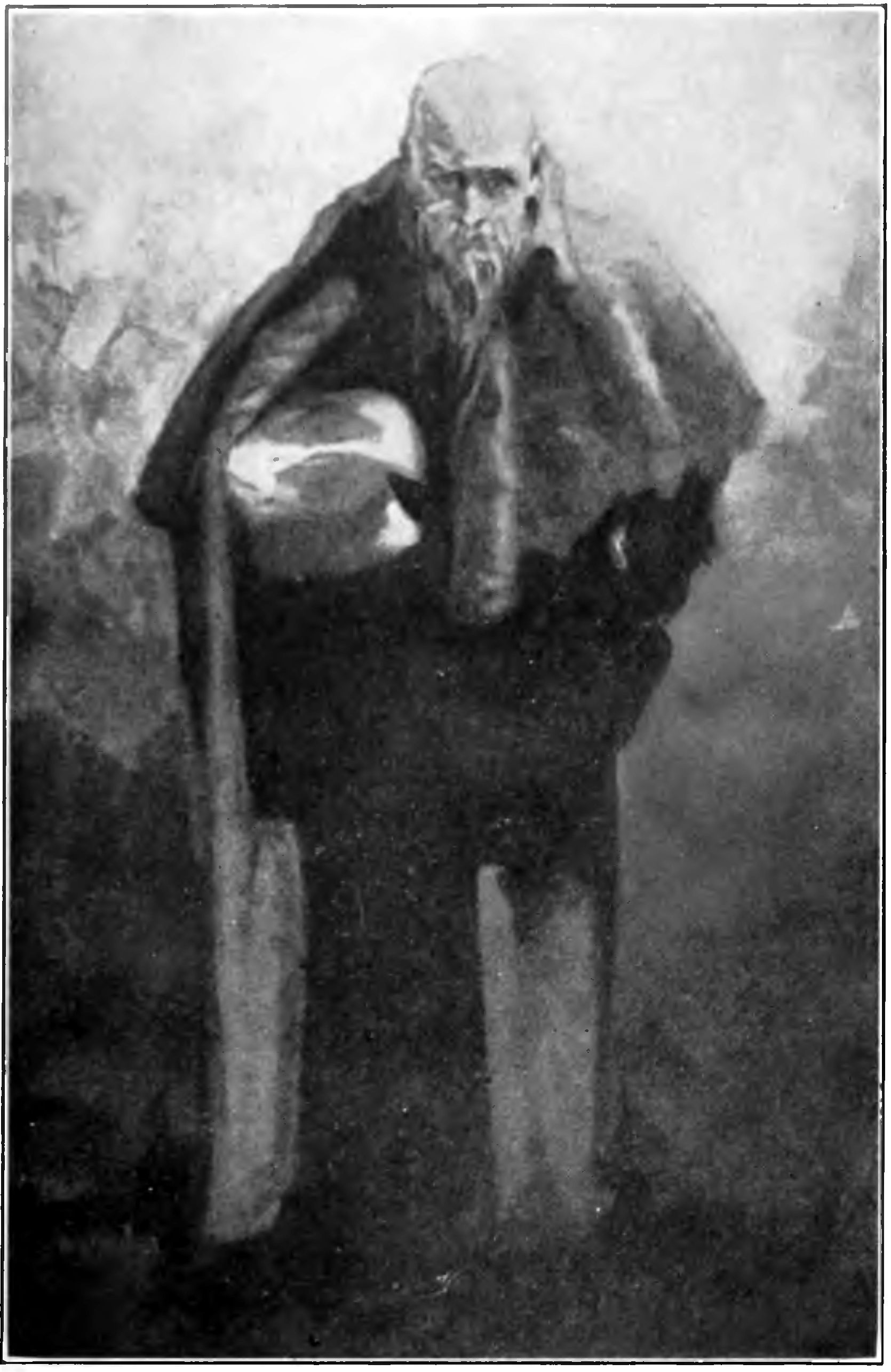
Sax Rohmer's Moris Klaw

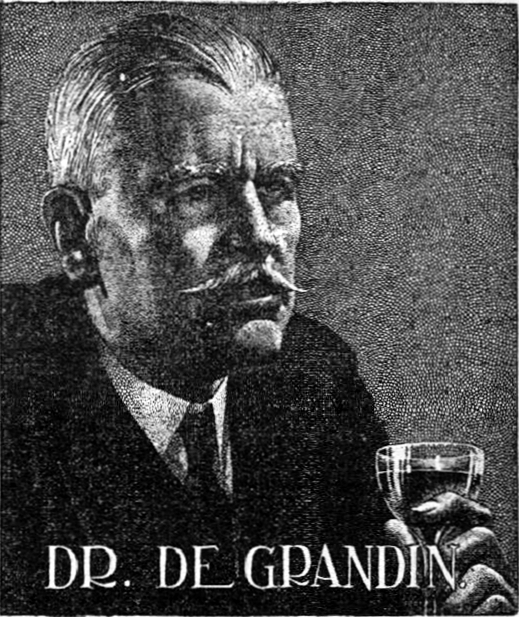
Seabury Quinn's Jules de Grandin

=== Film and television ===
In the 1970s, there were a number of attempts at occult detective television series and films. While not overtly occult detectives, the heroes and heroine of the 1968–1969 ITC cult classic sci-fi thriller series The Champions inherited occult powers from a Tibetan lama and used these powers to investigate crime.

Other examples include Fear No Evil (1969) and its sequel, Ritual of Evil (1970), starring Louis Jourdan as psychologist David Sorrell; The Sixth Sense (1972) a TV series starring Gary Collins as a psychic investigator; The Norliss Tapes (1973) with Roy Thinnes as a reporter investigating the supernatural; Baffled! (1973), a British production with Leonard Nimoy and Susan Hampshire vs. an evil occult society; God Told Me To, a 1976 horror and detective film with police procedural and paranormal elements; Spectre (1977), starring Robert Culp and Gig Young as criminologists turned demonologists; The World of Darkness (1977) and its sequel, The World Beyond (1978), starring Granville Van Dusen as a man who battles the supernatural following his own near death experience.

The most successful effort of this period was the short-lived television series, Kolchak: The Night Stalker (1974–75), starring Darren McGavin; the weekly series was based on two backdoor pilots (The Night Stalker and The Night Strangler) produced by Dan Curtis and scripted by Richard Matheson, based on an unpublished work by Jeff Rice. Kolchak's adventures have been continued in books by Rice and in the comic book Kolchak Tales. Matheson's Kolchak Scripts have also been published.

The Saturday morning cartoon Scooby-Doo followed an occult detective format, though in the earlier series the apparent occult influences were all revealed as (fully natural) tricksters. In the wake of Scooby-Doo's success, several of the follow-ups from Hanna-Barbera involved varying degrees of occult and supernatural influence, including Goober and the Ghost Chasers, The Funky Phantom, and some of the 1980s entries in the Scooby-Doo franchise. To keep the plotlines suitable for Saturday morning audiences, the occult villains were kept family-friendly.

More recent examples include: Angel Heart, The Believers, Blood Ties, Constantine, The Dresden Files, Dylan Dog: Dead of Night, The Exorcist III, Forever Knight, Grimm, Lord of Illusions, Lucifer, The Ninth Gate, !Oka Tokat, Penny Dreadful, R.I.P.D., Special Unit 2, Split Second, Supernatural, Twin Peaks, Vidocq, The X-Files, Millennium, Angel, True Detective (particularly seasons one and four), The Vampire Detective, Evil, and Wednesday.

=== Comics, manga, and anime ===
Doctor Occult, created by Jerry Siegel and Joe Shuster, was one of the earliest occult detectives in comic books with a 1935 debut. Doctor Occult was first a costumed superhero but his appearance quickly changed to a more typical detective (Fedora hat and long coat). The Phantom Stranger, created by John Broome and Carmine Infantino, first appeared in an eponymous six-issue comics anthology published in 1952, first as a debunker of fake supernatural events but later incarnations showed him with mystical or supernatural abilities. Doctor Occult and the Phantom Stranger were both published by DC Comics, with Occult falling into obscurity for decades before a 1980s revival, while the Phantom Stranger appeared steadily from his debut if mostly in a supporting role.

The comic book Hellblazer began in the 1980s and boosted the popularity and image of the occult detective fiction genre and shaped it to its modern form. Many modern examples of the genre such as Hellboy, Supernatural, Grimm, The Originals, and The Dresden Files have been influenced by it, and many imitators of both the series and its character flourished such as Criminal Macabre, Gravel, Planetary, and others. Its elements and style have been used countless of times in other works and many analogues of the cynical protagonist John Constantine have appeared.

Other examples of occult detectives in comic books include Doctor Spektor from Gold Key Comics; Hellboy from the Dark Horse series of same name; Dylan Dog from the Sergio Bonelli Editore series; Nightlinger by Steven Philip Jones and published by Caliber Comics; certain elements and characters in The Goon; Martin Hel, a character created by Robin Wood; the Joe Golem series; and Witchblade from Top Cow Productions. Two Hellblazer writers have gone on to write their own occult detective characters: Sebastian O also at Vertigo by Grant Morrison and Warren Ellis' Gravel from Avatar Press. 2000 AD has featured a number over the years in their own eponymous series: Bix Barton, Devlin Waugh, Ampney Crucis Investigates and Dandridge. The occult detective team of Syd Deadlocke and Doc Martin, featured in Pulse of Darkness and other comics by Chris G.C. Sequeira, also fits into this genre. There is also the comic book series Ruse, once owned by CrossGen and now by Marvel Comics.

Examples in manga and anime include Majin Tantei Nōgami Neuro, Mushishi, YuYu Hakusho, Ghost Hunt, Mononoke, Death Note, Ghosts at School, Dream Hunter Rem, Bakemonogatari and Nightwalker: The Midnight Detective.

=== Video and computer games ===
- Alpha Polaris
- Amnesia series
  - Amnesia: The Dark Descent
  - Amnesia: A Machine for Pigs
- Asylum
- The Adventures of Dog Mendonça & Pizzaboy
- Barrow Hill series
  - Barrow Hill: Curse of the Ancient Circle
  - Barrow Hill: The Dark Path
- Betrayer
- The Black Mirror series
  - The Black Mirror
  - Black Mirror II: Reigning Evil
  - Black Mirror III: Final Fear
  - Black Mirror
- Blackwell series
  - The Blackwell Legacy
  - Blackwell Unbound
  - The Blackwell Convergence
  - The Blackwell Deception
  - The Blackwell Epiphany
- Call of Cthulhu
- Call of Cthulhu: Dark Corners of the Earth
- Clive Barker's Undying
- Clock Tower series
  - Clock Tower (1995)
  - Clock Tower (1996)
  - Clock Tower II: The Struggle Within
  - Clock Tower 3
- Condemned series
  - Condemned: Criminal Origins
  - Condemned 2: Bloodshot
- Cryostasis: Sleep of Reason
- D4: Dark Dreams Don't Die
- Daemonica
- Dark Fall series
  - Dark Fall: The Journal
  - Dark Fall II: Lights Out
  - Dark Fall: Lost Souls
- Dark Seed series
  - Dark Seed
  - Dark Seed II
- Darkness Within series
  - Darkness Within: In Pursuit of Loath Nolder
  - Darkness Within 2: The Dark Lineage
- Dead Reefs
- Disco Elysium
- Discworld Noir
- Dracula series
  - Dracula: Resurrection
  - Dracula 2: The Last Sanctuary
  - Dracula 3: The Path of the Dragon
  - Dracula 4: The Shadow of the Dragon
  - Dracula 5: The Blood Legacy
- Echo Night series
  - Echo Night
  - Echo Night 2: The Lord of Nightmares
  - Echo Night: Beyond
- Gabriel Knight series
  - Gabriel Knight: Sins of the Fathers
  - The Beast Within: A Gabriel Knight Mystery (also known as Gabriel Knight 2: The Beast Within)
  - Gabriel Knight 3: Blood of the Sacred, Blood of the Damned
- Ghost Trick: Phantom Detective
- Gray Dawn
- The Lost Crown series
  - The Lost Crown: A Ghost-Hunting Adventure
  - The Last Crown: Midnight Horror
  - The Last Crown: Blackenrock
- Megaten series
  - Shin Megami Tensei: Devil Summoner
  - Devil Summoner: Soul Hackers
  - Devil Summoner: Raidou Kuzunoha vs. the Soulless Army
  - Devil Summoner 2: Raidou Kuzunoha vs. King Abaddon
  - Soul Hackers 2
- Memento Mori series
  - Memento Mori
  - Memento Mori 2
- Murdered: Soul Suspect
- Necronomicon: The Dawning of Darkness (also known as Necronomicon: The Gateway to Beyond)
- Nocturne
- Pathologic
- Penumbra series
  - Penumbra: Overture
  - Penumbra: Black Plague
  - Penumbra: Requiem
- Phantasmagoria
  - Phantasmagoria
  - Phantasmagoria: A Puzzle of Flesh (also known as Phantasmagoria 2)
- Return of the Obra Dinn
- Rhiannon: Curse of the Four Branches
- Sanitarium
- Scratches
- Shadow of Memories
- Silverload
- Stygian: Reign of the Old Ones
- The Vanishing of Ethan Carter
- The Wolf Among Us
- The X-Files Game

== See also ==
- List of science fiction and fantasy detectives
