= What Dreams May Come (Wellman novel) =

1983 novel by Manly Wade Wellman

- Author: Manly Wade Wellman
- Language: English
- Genre: Fantasy, Weird Fiction
- Publisher: Doubleday
- Publication date: January 1983
- Publication place: United States
- Media type: Print (Hardback & Paperback)
- Pages: 175
- ISBN: 0-385-18253-8
- OCLC: 9555403
- Dewey Decimal: 813/.54 19
- LC Class: PS3545.E52858 W48 1983
- Preceded by: Lonely Vigils
- Followed by: The School of Darkness

What Dreams May Come is a fantasy novel by American author Manly Wade Wellman. It is the second of three books featuring supernatural investigator John Thunstone. The book derives its title from a line in Hamlet's famous "To be, or not to be..." soliloquy.

== Background ==
The character of John Thunstone had previously appeared in a series of short stories by Wellman. Originally published in popular pulp magazines of the day, several of them were collected and reprinted in an anthology, Lonely Vigils. Wellman decided to follow the anthology with the character's first book-length adventure. In his introduction to the novel Wellman mistakenly states that, while many of the locations he mentions have real-life counterparts, Claines is an entirely fictional locale, and such a place has never existed in England. However, a small community named Claines exists, north of Worcester.

== Plot summary ==
While visiting London, John Thunstone hears strange stories concerning the nearby hamlet of Claines, a pair of ancient pagan artifacts, and the annual ritual that accompanies them. As the date of the ritual is only a few days away Thunstone decides to travel to Claines and witness the ritual for himself. While there he experiences strange visions of the distant past and gradually realizes their significance to the present.

== Characters ==
- John Thunstone is an American scholar and investigator of the paranormal. He has the imposing physical stature and square-jawed good looks of an archetypical literary hero. Although he suffers from no disability, he always carries a cane which was given to him by his good friend Judge Pursuivant. The cane's shaft conceals a silver blade forged by Saint Dunstan, which serves as a formidable weapon against the supernatural creatures Thunstone encounters in his travels.
- Gram Ensley is the richest man in Claines who also owns the majority of its land. He lives at Chimney Pots, an expansive manor which has been in his family for centuries. Ensley is a respected, if feared, figure in the community and makes significant contributions to the local parish although he does not regularly attend services.
- Constance Bailey is a self-proclaimed white witch who works at the boarding house where Thunstone stays. Her benevolent acts of magic are well received by the majority of Claines' inhabitants although she continually draws the ire of Mr. Ensley who openly states his belief that she should be expelled from town.

== Reception ==
In Issue 29 of Abyss, Eric Olson noted "Like most of Wellman's novels, this is a case of a strong central character disrupting the plans of assorted evil forces and persons, armed with only a few bits of white magic and an indomitable will." Olson commented, "There are a lot of nice ideas here, not startlingly new, but well written and constantly interesting." Olson concluded, "All in all, I'd recommend this book quite highly. It is pleasant to read, artfully written and quite good overall, showing a pleasant flexibility in a writer who is just building the reputation he has deserved for many years."
