= Lonely Vigils =

- Dust-jacket from the first edition
- Author: Manly Wade Wellman
- Illustrator: George Evans
- Cover artist: George Evans
- Language: English
- Genre: fantasy, horror and mystery
- Publisher: Carcosa
- Publication date: 1981
- Publication place: United States
- Media type: Print (hardback)
- Pages: xii, 377
- ISBN: 0-913796-03-4
- OCLC: 9028709
- Followed by: What Dreams May Come

Lonely Vigils is a collection of fantasy, horror and mystery short stories by American author Manly Wade Wellman. It was released in 1981 by Carcosa in an edition of 1,548 copies, of which the 566 pre-ordered copies were signed by the author and artist. The stories feature Wellman's supernatural detective characters, Judge Keith Hilary Pursuivant, Professor Nathan Enderby, and John Thunstone. The story "Vigil" first appeared in the magazine Strange Stories (volume 2 number 3, December 1939; under pen name Hampton Wells). The remaining stories originally appeared in the magazine Weird Tales.

== Contents ==
- Foreword
- "The Hairy Ones Shall Dance"
- "The Black Drama"
- "The Dreadful Rabbits"
- "The Half-Haunted"
- "Vigil"
- "The Third Cry to Legba"
- "The Golden Goblins"
- "Hoofs"
- "Letters of Cold Fire"
- "John Thunstone's Inheritance"
- "Sorcery from Thule"
- "The Dead Man's Hand"
- "Throne on the Threshold"
- "The Shonokins"
- "Blood From a Stone"
- "The Dai Sword"
- "Twice Cursed"
- "Shonokin Town"
- "The Leonardo Rondache"
- "The Last Grave of Lill Warran"
