= John Thunstone =

- First appearance: The Third Cry to Legba
- Last appearance: The School of Darkness
- Created by: Manly Wade Wellman
- Portrayed by: Alex Cord

In-universe information
- Gender: Male
- Occupation: Occult detective

John Thunstone is a fictional character and the hero of a series of stories by author Manly Wade Wellman.

== Character biography ==
Thunstone is a scholar and playboy who investigates mysterious supernatural events. He is physically large and strong, intelligent, handsome, and wealthy. He is also well-read in occult matters and has access to several weapons that are especially potent against vampires, werewolves and other supernatural creatures.

Thunstone has a sword-cane with a silver blade said to have been forged by Saint Dunstan, patron saint of silversmiths and a noted opponent of the Devil. The blade is inscribed with a text from Judges chapter 5 in the Vulgate, "Sic pereant omnes inimici tui" — "thus perish all your enemies". The sword-cane had also been used by Wellman's earlier character, Judge Pursuivant, who passed it on to Thunstone when his advanced age made him too weak to effectively wield it.

In addition to the ghosts and other traditional supernatural beings, several of Thunstone's enemies are Wellman's unique creations. These include the shonokins, a race of human-like creatures who claim to have ruled North America before the coming of humans. Thunstone's most persistent foe is a sorcerer named Rowley Thorne, who appears in a number of the stories.

== Collections ==
Thunstone originally appeared in short stories published in the pulp magazines. Wellman would later write two novels with Thunstone: What Dreams May Come (1983) and The School of Darkness (1985). Lonely Vigils collected all the Thunstone short stories at the time. All his Thunstone short stories have been collected in The Third Cry to Legba and Other Invocations (2000). All the Thunstone stories, including the novels, have been collected in The Complete John Thunstone (2013).

== Adaptation ==
In 1988, Rouse Him Not was adapted as an episode of the anthology TV series Monsters. Thunstone (renamed "Thunston") was played by the actor Alex Cord.

== Bibliography ==
=== Short stories ===
- "The Third Cry to Legba", Weird Tales Nov ’43
- "The Golden Goblins", Weird Tales Jan ’44
- "Hoofs", Weird Tales Mar ’44
- "The Letters of Cold Fire", Weird Tales May ’44
- "John Thunstone’s Inheritance", Weird Tales Jul ’44
- "Sorcery from Thule", Weird Tales Sep ’44
- "The Dead Man’s Hand", Weird Tales Nov ’44
- "Thorne on the Threshold", Weird Tales Jan ’45
- "The Shonokins", Weird Tales Mar ’45
- "Blood from a Stone", Weird Tales May ’45
- "The Dai Sword", Weird Tales Jul ’45
- "Twice Cursed", Weird Tales Mar ’46
- "Shonokin Town", Weird Tales Jul ’46
- "The Leonardo Rondache", Weird Tales Mar ’48
- "The Last Grave of Lill Warran", Weird Tales May ’51
- "Rouse Him Not", Kadath July 1982

=== Novels ===
- What Dreams May Come, 1983
- The School of Darkness, 1985
