= Sherlock Holmes's War of the Worlds =

1975 novel by Manly Wade Wellman

- Original Cover
- Author: Manly Wade Wellman; Wade Wellman
- Language: English
- Genre: Mystery, Science fiction
- Published: 1975
- Publication place: United Kingdom
- Based on: Sherlock Holmes by Sir Arthur Conan Doyle; The War of the Worlds by H. G. Wells

Sherlock Holmes's War of the Worlds is a science fiction novel by American writers Manly Wade Wellman and his son Wade Wellman. A sequel to H. G. Wells's The War of the Worlds, it was published in 1975. It is a pastiche crossover which combines H. G. Wells's 1897 extraterrestrial invasion story with Sir Arthur Conan Doyle's Sherlock Holmes and Professor Challenger characters. The book is composed of stories originally published in The Magazine of Fantasy & Science Fiction.

== Plot ==
The story consists of the adventures of Sherlock Holmes, Dr. Watson, and Professor Challenger in London during the Martian invasion as described in Wells's novel.

== Background ==
The book was inspired by a viewing of A Study in Terror.

The underlying philosophy of the book is very different to, indeed contradictory to, the original Wells story in which the idea is repeatedly expressed of humans being completely helpless before the Martian invaders, as other creatures are before humans. Conversely, in the Wellmans' book Holmes, Watson, and Challenger continually confront and outwit the Martians, undeterred by the invaders' technological superiority.

The story features a romantic relationship between Holmes and his landlady Mrs. Hudson, of which Watson is oblivious.

== Publication history ==
Titan Books reprinted the book in 2009, under the title of The Further Adventures of Sherlock Holmes: The War of the Worlds as part of its Further Adventures series, which collects a number of noted pastiches.

== See also ==
- Sherlock Holmes pastiches
