= Michael G. Williams =

American novelist

- Born: North Carolina, U.S.
- Education: University of North Carolina at Chapel Hill; Appalachian State University
- Occupations: Writer, podcaster, information security
- Writing career
- Pen name: Klarion
- Genres: Queer science fiction, horror
- Notable awards: Manly Wade Wellman Award
- Website: michaelgwilliamsbooks.com

Michael G. Williams is an American author, podcaster, and speaker who writes queer-themed science fiction, horror, and urban fiction novels and short stories. His novel, Fall in Autumn, won the 2020 Manly Wade Wellman Award.

== Early life and education ==
Williams grew up in a remote part of Appalachia in Western North Carolina.

He attended the University of North Carolina at Chapel Hill where he was a member of the social and literary fraternity St. Anthony Hall and the music fraternity Mu Beta Psi. He is currently pursuing a master's degree in Appalachian studies at Appalachian State University.

== Career ==
=== Author ===
Williams wrote The Withrow Chronicles, a vampire suburban fantasy series set in North Carolina. Perishables, the first book in this series, won the 2012 Laine Cunningham Novel Award.

His gay science fiction, detective novel, A Fall in Autumn, received the 2020 Manly Wade Wellman Award from the North Carolina Speculative Fiction Foundation (NCSFF). This juried competition included more than eighty titles. The NCSFF writes, "Fall in Autumn features staggering world-building in technology, culture, and religion; an amazing, living, breathing, dying, flying city; a private eye for the science fictional ages; and a mystery with plenty of twists and turns that add up to a truly stunning book which reflects on human and artificial human nature, past, present, and future."

Williams also wrote the Servant/Sovereign trilogy, an urban fantasy series of novellas set in San Francisco. His short stories have been included in a number of anthologies, and he also helps develop tabletop role-playing games. In addition, he reviews comics under the name Klarion for the website Pink Kryptonite.

=== Speaker ===
Williams was a speaker at ConGregate 2, a speculative fiction convention, on July 10 through July 15, 2015, in High Point, North Carolina. He participated in panel discussions, including "Defining Rogues and Scoundrels," "The Evolving Role of Authors," "Successful Self-Publishing: Tricks and Traps," "What Horror Should We Be Reading," "The Location Next Door," "The Cross Appeal of Niche Genres," "Beyond Spandex Studs," "Other Loves," and "Tail End in Seat." Williams also gave two readings of his works.

From July 14 through July 16, 2017, he was a literary speaker at the dual event ConGregate 4 / DeepSouthCon 55. He was a panelist for "Mystery Science Theater 3000 (MST3K): The Reboot," "Heroes, Anti-Heroes, Villains," "Writing from Different Perspectives," "Creating Magic," and "The Dichotomy Between Good and Evil." He also gave the presentation "I'll See Your Again in 25 Years" and "Java & Pros", the latter with author William C. Tracy.

Williams was also a guest speaker for ConGregate 5 in July 2018, participating in the panel for "Diverse Voices In Creative Expression," "What Should I Be Reading," "Black Panther Deconstructed," "Writing Local," "Balancing Act: Life & Creative Work," "Critter in SF," "Build an Alien," "Home Recording on the Cheap," "Novellas: The Wave Of The Future," "Discover Discovery," "Silver Anniversaries on The Silver Screen," and "And Then The Thief Said…"

June 2021, Williams was a literary guest speaker at the ConCarolinas. He participated in the panels "21st Century Privacy and Security," "The New Media Primer," "Let's Make a Campaign," "Real Social Media," "When Art Surpasses the Artist," "Hell is Othering People," "Writing Paranormal and Fantasy with Non-Traditional Romantic Pairings," and "Who is Your Favorite Dracula?"

On July 2, 2021, he was the guest speaker on the Wrote Podcast. He discussed "empowering queer voices" and "relating the queer experience through horror, science fiction, and urban fantasy." On July 9 and 10, 2021, he was again a literary speaker at the dual ConGregate 7 / DeepSouthCon 59 in Winston-Salem, North Carolina. He participated in "Explaining the Unexplainable," "State of the Federation," "Appalachian Speculative Fiction," and "Sci-Fighters: Ultimate Visual Showcase." He also did a reading of his work and presented "Arcane Carolinas Presents: Strange Skies Over Chimney Rock."

On June 11, 2022, Williams was a speaker for the WriteHive Annual Conference, the world's largest free virtual writing conference. He participated in the panel discussions "Body Positive Representation in Fiction," "LGBTQ+ Rep in Historical Settings," and "Joy is Resistance: The Need for Joyful Stories by Marginalized Creators."

He is scheduled to be a literary guest speaker at ConGregate 8 in July 2022 with the panels "This Wasn’t the Dystopia I Ordered: Post-Pandemic Storytelling," "Telling the Future through Science Fiction," "The Factual Places Behind Fictional Stories," "Stories of Joy & Resistance: Marginalized Communities in Speculative Fiction," "Saving the Day While Getting Stepped On: The Antihero's Anti-Journey," "Queer Fiction on the Rise," "How Did It Hold Up," "Is Horror Back? Did It Ever Leave?" and "Science Fiction: Broken Todays or Better Tomorrows?" He will also record his podcast Arcane Carolinas at the Con with Charlie Mewshaw.

Williams is also scheduled to be the guest of honor at the Ret-Con Literary and Fandom Convention in February 2023.

=== Podcasts ===
==== Arcane Carolinas ====
Williams and Charlie Mewshaw co-host the podcast Arcane Carolinas, exploring legends and myths of North Carolina and South Carolina. The two met when they both worked for the University of North Carolina at Chapel Hill. Since its start in the fall of 2020, Arcane Carolinas has expanded to include a fanzine, live events, trading cards, and clothing. In addition, an Arcane Carolinas book was released in 2023 for which Williams authored the foreword.

Although they have been approached by sponsors and podcast networks, Williams and Mewshaw want their podcast to remain independent as long as possible. However, they have been in discussions with several production companies about turning the podcast into a television show.

On January 12, 2023, Arcane Carolinas won the WRAL Voter's Choice Award in the podcast category.

In October 2023, Beaufort County, South Carolina's public television station BCTV debuted a series title Sea Island Spirits. The programming is based on different haunts in the Beaufort County area, sharing the history behind the most famous buildings, superstitions, and folklore. Appearing under the Arcane Carolinas banner, Williams and Mewshaw were featured in the first and third episodes (The Lands End Light, and Bottle Trees respectively).

==== Data@Rest ====
Williams works in information security, serving as the network team lead at the University of North Carolina at Chapel Hill. With his former co-worker Charlie Mewshaw, currently chief information security officer at Fayetteville State University, Williams produces the podcast Data@Rest. Data@Rest was started by the duo in 2019 and is released by the university's Information Security Office on Apple Podcasts, Spotify, and the web.

==== Social Distancing Radio ====
Williams hosts and produces Social Distancing Radio where he reads fiction and interviews writers.

== Awards ==
- 2020: Manly Wade Wellman Award for A Fall in Autumn
- 2012: Laine Cunningham Award first prize for Perishables

== Publications ==
=== Novels ===
==== Withrow Chronicles ====
- Perishables: (Falstaff Books, 2017) ISBN 978-1946926098
- Tooth & Nail (Falstaff Books, 2017) ISBN 978-1946926104
- Deal with the Devil (Falstaff Books, 2017) ISBN 978-1946926111
- Attempted Immortality (Falstaff Books, 2017) ISBN 978-1946926128
- Nobody Gets Out Alive (Falstaff Books, 2019) ISBN 978-1645540045

==== The Flying City of Autumn ====
- A Fall in Autumn (Falstaff Books, 2021) ISBN 979-8482455654
- New Life in Autumn (Falstaff Books, 2022) ISBN 979-8830012157

=== Novellas ===
==== Servant/Sovereign trilogy ====
- Through the Doors of Oblivion (Falstaff Books, 2019) ISBN 978-1698272320
- All the Pomp of Earthly Majesty (Falstaff Books, 2020) ISBN 979-8640981995
- Shut the Gates of Mercy (Falstaff Books, 2022) ISBN 979-8404949469

=== Short story anthologies ===
- Theme-Thology: Invasion ( HDWPbooks, 2013) ASIN B00FG1DF9Q
- Wrapped In Red: Thirteen Tales of Vampiric Horror (Sekhmet Books, 2013) ISBN 978-1491026342
- Wrapped In White: Thirteen Tales of Spectres, Ghosts, and Spirits (Sekhmet Books, 2014) ISBN 978-1496027153
- Wrapped In Black: Thirteen Tales of Witches and the Occult (Sekhmet Books, 2014) ISBN 978-1502512376
- Write to Rescue (SideStreet Cookie Publishing, 2014) ISBN 9781505469882
- Holiday Wrappings: A Selection of Witches, Ghosts, and Vampires from the WRAPPED Anthology Series (Sekhmet Books, 2014) ASIN B00PJID9G0
- WeAreNotThis: Carolina Writers for Equality (Falstaff Books, 2017) ISBN 978-1542523417
- Falstaff Pride 2020: A Celebration of LGBTQIA+ Authors (Falstaff Books, 2020) ASIN B08BBK885X
- A Woman Unbecoming (Crone Girls Press, 2022) ASIN B0B7822JGM
- Playing With a Full Deck: Stories of Hope in Hard Times (Aces High, Jokers Wild) (Amphibian Press, 2024) ASIN B0CJQH3G2R

=== Articles ===
"The Elusive Book Publishing Process: A Little Risk, a Little Reward." Open Source, September 26, 2012.

== Personal life ==
Williams lives in Durham, North Carolina with his husband. He has resided in the Research Triangle area since 1992. He serves as the historian of the Xi chapter of St. Anthony Hall at the University of North Carolina at Chapel Hill.
