= The Hanging Stones =

1982 horror novel by Manly Wade Wellman

- Cover art by Bruce Schluter
- Author: Manly Wade Wellman
- Cover artist: Bruce Schluter
- Series: Silver John
- Genre: Horror
- Publisher: Doubleday Books
- Publication date: 1982
- ISBN: 0-385-17672-4
- Preceded by: The Lost and the Lurking
- Followed by: The Voice of the Mountain

The Hanging Stones is a horror novel by Manly Wade Wellman that was published by Doubleday Books in 1982. It was the fifth of six novels in Wellman's "Silver John" series.

== Plot ==
Noel Kottler, a millionaire industrialist, is building a copy of Stonehenge in the old Appalachian mountains of North Carolina as the center of a new theme park. But the construction has been plagued by unaccountable happenings. Although Kottler scoffs at the suggestion of supernatural forces, Silver John, a mountain balladeer who is sensitive to the supernatural, believes the circle of stones has triggered the resurgence of an ancient evil. Silver John must do all in his power to protect the innocent people of the mountains from ancient spirits, a pack of werewolves, and members of spiritualist churches as the new Stonehenge nears completion.

== Publication history ==
Manly Wade Wellman first used the protagonist Silver John in a 1963 collection of short stories titled Who Fears the Devil? Wellman followed this with five novels, the third being The Hanging Stones, published by Doubleday in 1982.

== Reception ==
In Issue 27 of Abyss, J.R. Davies called this "a tale of a twisted dream ... Few writers command atmosphere this well, and it is always a pleasure to be introduced to Wellman's characters." Davies noted "there is almost no plot to this story. Wellman relies heavily on situation, mood and characters to make his story. The result is a unique form of poetic story-telling where the action is more felt than understood." Davies concluded, "Read this book, read all of Wellman's books. Inside these pages waits a new world which is familiar in many ways, but still as alien and fascinating as any fantastic plane."

In the July 1983 issue of Amazing Stories, Frank Catalano was disappointed in this book, writing, "The Hanging Stones is another book that appears effortless, but in this case, it's as though not much effort has been put into it. The Hanging Stones is the fourth novel in the Silver John series, and to its credit, the book does stand on its own. Unfortunately, the plot is so thin, it would have made a better novelet than novel." Cataqlano noted, "Making a book like this work requires an especially good job of getting the reader to at least accept the meshing of the everyday real world with the supernatural; here, it doesn't ring true. Add to that one-dimensional characters (the Ruthless Business Tycoon; the Brilliant Good Ol' Boy; the Plucky Girl) you can’t feel anything for and a narrative style that's so folksy it drops into cutesy at times, and you have a book that isn’t worth picking up except by the most diehard Wellman fan."

In the 1985 book Discovering Modern Horror Fiction, Robert Coulson noted that this book was not typical of Wellman's usual style, writing "Wellman is usually economical with his characters and plot elements; here he's used the liberally ... In a way, there are too many characters; some of them are not fully realized."

In the May 1983 issue of Science Fiction & Fantasy Book Review, Walter Meyers wrote, "The Hanging Stones gives the admirer of the series a chance to renew acquaintance with John's wife, Ecadure, a character who could well have stepped out of a mountain ballad. The novel is a welcome addition to one of the outstanding fantasy series now in print."

In Issue 7 of Analog Science Fiction/Science Fact, Tom Easton noted, "Joh is largely an onlooker, a vehicle for the rich local color and song we expect for Wellmnan. He brings us very little of the Appalachain arcana we have seen in past yarns, and we miss it." Easton concluded, "Has Wellman run out of steam with Silver John? I'd hate to think so, for I like both character and style. Tye earlier stories seem more vigorous, fresher, at least in memory."

== Reviews ==
- Review by Roger C. Schlobin (1983) in Fantasy Newsletter, #57 March 1983
- Review by C. J. Henderson [as by Chris Henderson] (1983) in Whispers, October 1983
