= Asylum (2025 video game) =

2025 video game download in game

- Developer: Senscape
- Publisher: Senscape
- Designer: Agustín Cordes
- Engine: Unreal Engine 4
- Platforms: Windows; OS X Linux; Nintendo Switch 2 PlayStation 4 PlayStation 5 Xbox Series X/S
- Release: March 13, 2025; October 30, 2026
- Genres: Horror, Adventure
- Mode: Single-player

Asylum is a horror video game developed by Senscape, an independent video game developer located in Buenos Aires, Argentina. The game was authored by Agustín Cordes, who previously designed the game Scratches for the now-defunct developer Nucleosys. Taking place in a fictional insane asylum called the Hanwell Mental Institute, players are able to fully explore the institute, which is partially based on elements of real asylums. The clinic is built according to Kirkbride's plan, which is mentioned several times during the game. This type of mental hospital architecture was actually used in the past. The game was described as having "twisty storytelling" and "horrifying revelations", and an atmosphere-focused style of horror, much like Scratches.

The game was officially announced on July 9, 2010 after a previous viral marketing campaign that involved a series of online videos posted on YouTube alleged to be posted by an escaped inmate called Leonard Huntings. A fake website for the Hanwell Mental Institute was also created. The first official screenshots were posted on August 12, 2011.

On January 29, 2013, Agustín Cordes opened a Kickstarter campaign to raise US$100,666, which would be used to accelerate the game's development. On February 28, 2013, it successfully raised US$119,426, thus securing additional fundings to port the game to iPad and Android.

On October 31, 2024, It was announced that Asylum is currently scheduled for a March 6, 2025 release. The game was officially released on March 14, 2025.

== Plot ==
The main character drives to a largely abandoned insane asylum where he believes he was once a patient. He is greeted by Julia, the receptionist, at the lobby desk, who gives him permission to explore the grounds. He seeks information that may help him regain his memories of his time in the asylum, which have been lost.

As he explores the building, he encounters Bruno the security guard, and Dr. Miller, who has assumed control of the facility. He also encounters an escaped lunatic, as well as Lenny, a current patient.

Over time, he learns that he, Lenny, and another current patient, Bertrand, were part of a collective called "Group E." The main character must continue to make his way through the building and grounds as he tries to learn clues about his past.

He learns that the originator of the asylum -- Dr. Hanwell -- and a compatriot -- Dr. Ellis -- were using the Group E patients to explore mysterious tunnels beneath the asylum, where there lurks some kind of otherworldly entity. All of the patients who experienced the entity grew a brain tumor, including the protagonist.

Ultimately, he makes his way to the underground tunnel and sees the entity, which drives him completely insane. He commits a horrific act of violence by gouging Julia's eyes out with his thumbs, and then escapes the asylum and drives away.

== Reception ==
Asylum received mixed reviews from critics upon release. The game received praise for its atmosphere and soundtrack while also being criticized for its dated gameplay and derivative writing.
