= Manly Wade Wellman =

American novelist (1903–1986)

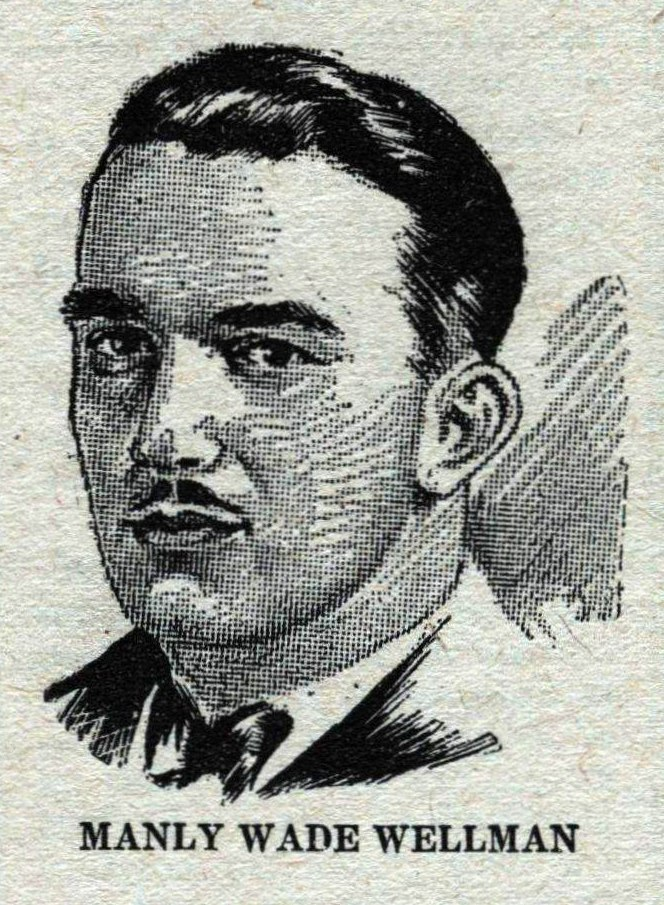
- Etching of Wellman in Wonder Stories (1931).
- Born: May 21, 1903; Kamundongo, Portuguese West Africa
- Died: April 5, 1986 (aged 82); Chapel Hill, North Carolina, US
- Education: Municipal University of Wichita (B.A); Columbia Law School (LL.B.)
- Occupation: Writer
- Spouse: Frances Obrist (d.2000)
- Children: 1
- Relatives: Frederick Creighton Wellman (father); Paul I. Wellman (brother)
- Writing career
- Pen name: Gabriel Barclay; Levi Crow; Gans T. Field; Hampton Wells; Wade Wells
- Years active: 1927–1986
- Genres: Detective; Fantasy; Historical; Juvenile; Science fiction; Weird; Western; Non-fiction
- Subjects: Folklore; History
- Notable works: Dead and Gone; Rebel Boast; Worse Things Waiting
- Notable awards: Edgar Award (1956); Pulitzer Prize (nom, 1956); World Fantasy Award (1975, 1980); Phoenix Award (1976); First Fandom Hall of Fame (1983); British Fantasy Award (1985); North Carolina Literary Hall of Fame (1996)

Manly Wade Wellman (May 21, 1903 – April 5, 1986) was an American writer. While his science fiction and fantasy stories appeared in such pulps as Astounding Stories, Startling Stories, Unknown and Strange Stories, Wellman is best remembered as one of the most popular contributors to the legendary Weird Tales and for his fantasy and horror stories set in the Appalachian Mountains, which draw on the native folklore of that region. Karl Edward Wagner referred to him as "the dean of fantasy writers." Wellman also wrote in a wide variety of other genres, including historical fiction, detective fiction, western fiction, juvenile fiction, and non-fiction.

Wellman was a long-time resident of North Carolina. He received many awards, including the World Fantasy Award and Edgar Allan Poe Award. In 2013, the North Carolina Speculative Fiction Foundation inaugurated an award named after him to honor other North Carolina authors of science fiction and fantasy.

Three of Wellman's most famous recurring protagonists are John, a.k.a. John the Balladeer, a.k.a. "Silver John", a wandering backwoods minstrel with a silver-stringed guitar; the elderly "occult detective" Judge Pursuivant; and John Thunstone, also an occult investigator.

Wellman wrote under a number of pseudonyms, including Gabriel Barclay, Levi Crow, Gans T. Field, Hampton Wells, and Wade Wells.

== Biography ==
=== Early years ===
Wellman was born in the village of Kamundongo, near the city of Silva Porto in Portuguese West Africa (now Angola). Wellman's father, Frederick Creighton Wellman, was stationed in the village as a medical officer. He spoke a local language before he learned English, and became an adopted son of a powerful chief whose vision Dr Wellman restored. As a small child, Manly twice visited London, where the family stayed in Torrington Square (obliterated during the Battle of Britain). When he was still a young boy, his family moved to the United States, where he attended school in Washington, D.C., and prep school in Salt Lake City. After graduating from Fairmount College (now Wichita State University in Kansas) with a BA in English in 1926, he received a Bachelor of Literature degree from the School of Journalism at Columbia University in 1927. A distinguished football player, he received little encouragement from either family or teachers for his plans to become a writer. An early story, "Back to the Beast", resulted in one teacher remarking "Your work is impossible!" Yet this same story became his first professional sale when editor Farnsworth Wright bought it and published it in Weird Tales (November 1927).

He was of partial Native American ancestry. According to the author note by Gahan Wilson in Gahan Wilson, ed. First World Fantasy Awards (NY: Doubleday, 1977, p. 253), Wellman's "ancestry reaches back through the Confederate South to colonial Virginia, with the potent infusion of Gascon French and American Indian."

Wellman cited the writers Edgar Allan Poe, M. R. James, Lord Dunsany, Lafcadio Hearn and Johannes V. Jensen as influences on his own work.

One of Wellman's brothers, Paul Wellman, was also a well published author; another, Frederick Lovejoy Wellman, was a noted plant pathologist.

=== The 1920s and 1930s ===
His first published story, "When the Lion Roared" (Thrilling Tales, May 1927), was based on the stories told to him in his African childhood upbringing. Wellman's first science fiction novel, The Invading Asteroid, was published in 1929 but he would not work at full length again until 1941.

Around that time he started a friendship with Vance Randolph, an acclaimed folklorist and expert on Ozark mountain magic and traditions. Randolf took Wellman on trips through the Arkansas Ozarks, learning folk traditions and meeting the secluded people of the American back country. It was through Randolph that Wellman met North Carolinian folk music legend Obray Ramsey, whose music would have a profound effect on Wellman and his writing.

In the late 1920s, during the silent film era, Wellman wrote movie reviews for the Wichita Beacon and also worked for The Wichita Eagle as a court and crime reporter. He sold many stories in this period to Ozark Stories and Thrilling Tales. He married Frances Obrist on June 14, 1930. Writing under the pen name "Garfield", she became a horror writer in her own right when she sold her first story to Weird Tales in 1939. During the Depression, Wellman's newspaper work started to dwindle, so in 1934 he moved from Kansas to New York City where he became assistant director of the WPA's New York Folklore Project.

Alfred Bester described meeting Wellman in about 1939: "Mort Weisinger introduced me to the informal luncheon gatherings of the working science fiction authors of the late thirties... The vivacious compère of those luncheons was Manley [sic] Wade Wellman, a professional Southerner full of regional anecdotes. It's my recollection that one of his hands was slightly shriveled, which may have been why he came on so strong for the Confederate cause. We were all very patient with that; after all, our side won the war. Wellman was quite the man-of-the-world for the innocent thirties; he always ordered wine with his lunch."

Moving from New York to New Jersey in 1939, Wellman wrote countless stories for the new field of comic books as well as for the pulps. During the war he served in New Jersey as a first lieutenant.

=== The 1940s: New York, Weird Tales, occult detectives and comic books ===
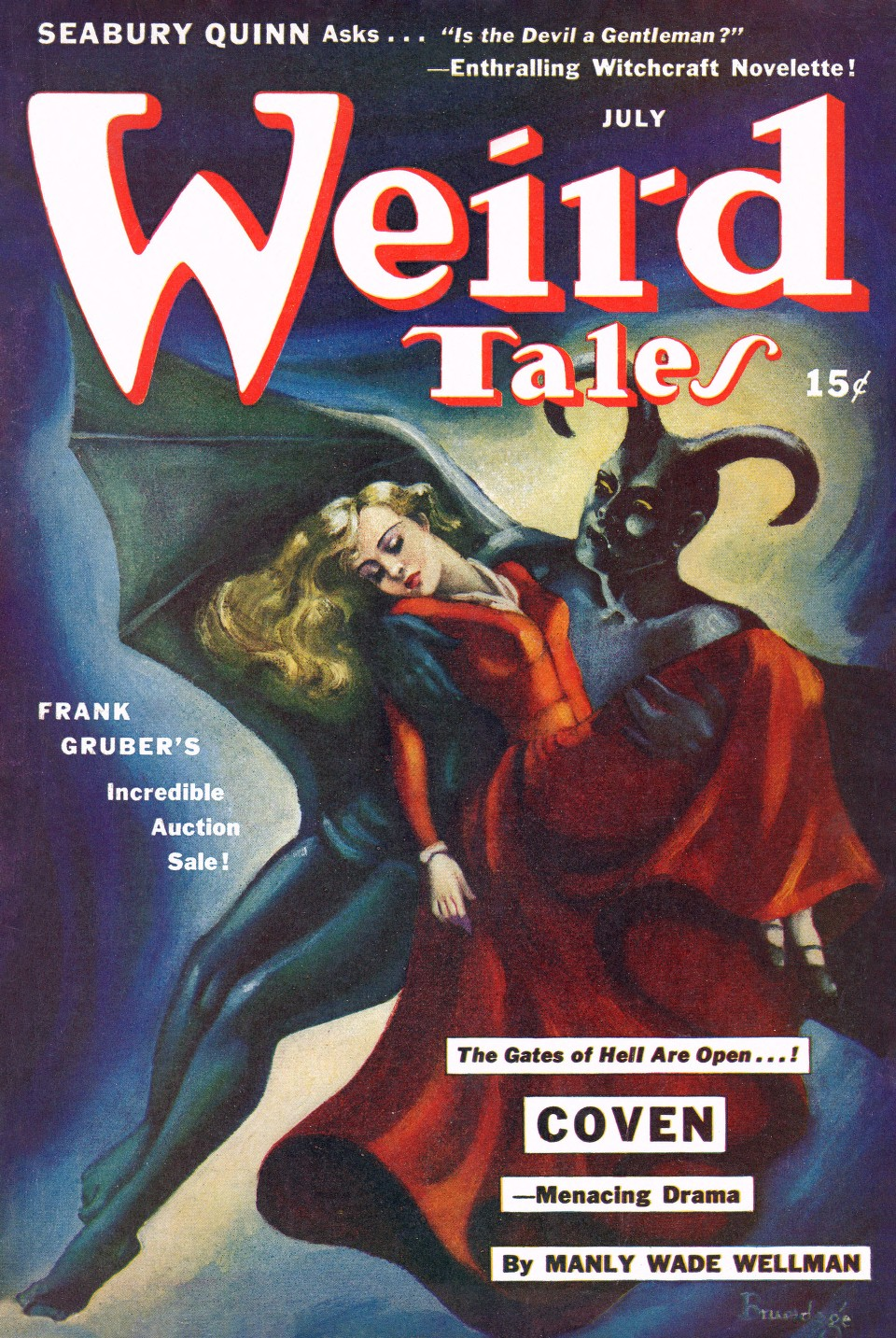
Wellman's novelette "Coven" was the cover story in the July 1942 Weird Tales

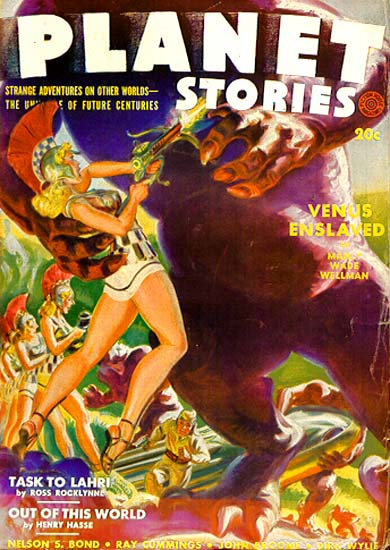
Wellman's novelette "Venus Enslaved" was the cover story in the Summer 1942 Planet Stories

In the 1930s and 1940s, Wellman began selling to the bigger publications such as Weird Tales, Wonder Stories and Astounding Stories. At this time, when Wellman was living in New York, Weird Tales published numerous stories based on three of his most famous characters: Judge Pursuivant, John Thunstone, and Professor Nathan Enderby.

Judge Keith Hilary Pursuivant (written under the pen name Gans T. Fields) is described as "a renowned scholar and retired judge, hero of World War I, and now hero of darker, more dangerous battles. Huge of frame, an epicure, an authority on the occult, Pursuivant strides forth from his reclusive home in West Virginia to confront evil wherever it appears."

John Thunstone is "a hulking Manhattanite playboy and dilettante, a serious student of the occult and a two-fisted brawler ready to take on any enemy. Armed with potent charms and a silver swordcane, Thunstone stalks supernatural perils in the posh night clubs and seedy hotels of New York, or in backwater towns lost in the countryside-- seeking out deadly sorcery as a hunter pursues a man-killer beast." Thunstone's arch-nemesis was the evil sorcerer Rowley Thorne. Thorne was based on the real-life occultist Aleister Crowley, the self-proclaimed "wickedest man in the world".

The lesser-known character Professor Nathan Enderby is a "slender savant and unassuming authority on the supernatural, aided by his sharp wits and his Chinese servant, Quong. His cabin in rural Pennsylvania is a retreat from the frenetic social life of New York City – and a fortress against the powers of black magic."

Wellman wrote one novel for the Edmond Hamilton-led pulp Captain Future, The Solar Invasion. When Captain Future was cancelled due to wartime paper shortages, the novel was instead published in Startling Stories (fall of 1946).

Following a similar path to such pulp writers as Frank Belknap Long, Wellman also wrote for various comic books (what he called "squinkies") and wrote the first issue of Captain Marvel Adventures for Fawcett Publishers. Later he would be called into court to testify against Fawcett in a lawsuit by National Comics Publications (later DC Comics) about plagiarism of Superman by the creators of Captain Marvel. Wellman testified that his editors had encouraged their writers to use Superman as the model for Captain Marvel. Though it took three years, National won their case. He also contributed to the writing of the comic book The Spirit while the franchise's creator, Will Eisner, was serving in the US military during World War II. Wellman also wrote for the comic Blackhawk.

Wellman made a return to novel-writing in the 1940s, publishing two full-length science fiction works, Sojarr of Titan and The Devil's Asteroid. In this decade he published several mystery novels, one a film tie-in.

Amongst Wellman's writer friends during the Weird Tales years were Malcolm Jameson, Seabury Quinn, Henry Kuttner, and Otto Binder. Wellman used to meet with these writers in a German restaurant in Times Square on a regular basis. He described these friendships as being "like a brotherhood".

In 1946 Wellman won the Ellery Queen Mystery Magazine Award over William Faulkner for his Native American detective tale "A Star for a Warrior". Apparently Faulkner was quite upset to be second fiddle to a science fiction and horror writer. Faulkner indignantly wrote to the editors of the magazine, proclaiming that he was the father of the French literary movement and the most important American writer in Europe.

Wellman's 1956 nonfiction historical work Rebel Boast was nominated for the Pulitzer Prize.

Throughout this period Wellman worked as a harvest hand, cowboy, roadhouse bouncer and newspaperman.

=== The 1950s: North Carolina, juveniles, science fiction and non-fiction ===
After serving as a lieutenant in World War II, in 1951 Wellman moved his family to Pinebluff, North Carolina. There he immersed himself in American southern mountain folklore and history, becoming an expert on the Civil War and the historic regions and peoples of the Old South. Later in 1951, he made his final move to the college town of Chapel Hill, North Carolina. Wellman built a vacation cabin on what he called Yandro Mountain in the Great Smoky Mountains next to his friend Obray Ramsey's home.

Wellman worked at many jobs to support himself while he wrote, though he sold many stories and books. His jobs included working on farms, in cotton gins, and working as a bouncer in a dance hall.

During this time, Wellman wrote a number of books that are considered regional classics today. Such books, drawn from his rich knowledge of Southern history, include the critically acclaimed account of the great steamboat race between the Robert E. Lee and the Natchez.

Wellman's best-known biographical work, Giant in Gray (1949), was based on his namesake, Confederate General Wade Hampton. Wellman wrote and published significant nonfiction works about the Old South, including county histories, throughout the 1950s and would continue to do so through to the 1970s.

Most of Wellman's work in the 1950s was devoted to young adult stories and science fiction novels. He produced no fewer than five science fiction novels in this decade, though one was a version of a long story previously published in the pulps. Two of his short stories were filmed in this decade for the television show Lights Out. He also wrote a western novel, Fort Sun Dance (1955), apparently his only venture into that genre.

=== The 1960s: science fiction and Silver John ===
Wellman wrote two science fiction novels in the sixties – Island in the Sky and also Candle of the Wicked (1960), which novelized the events leading up to the discovery of the Bender killings. His Captain Future novel The Solar Invasion was reprinted in paperback.

His best-known series dates from this period; it is composed of stories featuring the Appalachian woodsman and minstrel hero known as "John". They were first published in The Magazine of Fantasy and Science Fiction. The first stories of John were collected in Who Fears the Devil? (1963), based on the personal enthusiasm of August Derleth. Although Wellman only ever called the character "John" or "John the guitar picker", his later publishers Doubleday and Dell labelled the series Silver John as they felt the name was a better way of marketing the books.

=== The 1970s and '80s: resurgence and twilight years ===
The 1970s and 1980s marked a resurgence in Wellman's output and an increased attention to his legacy. Much of his best short general fantasy work over the years was collected by Karl Edward Wagner in Worse Things Waiting (1973), which won Wellman a World Fantasy Award and revived interest in his work. His 1975 novel Sherlock Holmes' War of the Worlds was collected from a series of Sherlock Holmes pastiche stories co-written with his son Wade Wellman and originally published in The Magazine of Fantasy and Science Fiction

Between 1979 and 1984 Wellman wrote five new novels featuring Silver John and in roughly the same period produced two full-length novels featuring his character John Thunstone, as well as seeing Thunstone's short adventures, and those of characters such as Judge Pursuivant, collected from the pulps in Lonely Vigils (1981). A movie based on the Silver John stories, The Legend of Hillbilly John, was released in 1972.

In 1980 Wellman received the World Fantasy Award for Lifetime Achievement.

Wellman was Guest of Honour (with Gene Wolfe and Rowena Merrill) at the World Fantasy Convention 1983 in Chicago.

At age 82, on June 15, 1985, Wellman suffered a serious fall and sustained severe fractures of his left elbow and shoulder which made him an invalid. A benefit auction for the ailing author was held in London at the annual Christmas Party of the British Fantasy Society and the funds raised sent to Wellman and his wife in a Christmas card. Due to the onset of gangrene in his legs following double amputation, Wellman's health failed further and he died at his home in Chapel Hill, North Carolina on April 5, 1986. Before his death he had been able to finish his historical novel Cahena about a medieval African warrior princess (see Kahina), published in 1986, and the final John the Balladeer short story "Where Did She Wander?"

The agent for his literary estate was his friend, the writer and editor Karl Edward Wagner, who edited the posthumous collections Valley So Low: Southern Mountain Stories and John the Balladeer. A benefit auction was held for Wellman's widow Frances, arranged by Southern fans Beth Gwinn and Sheri Morton, which raised $28,300 in funds. Harlan Ellison was the auctioneer. Included in the auction were such items as a mug owned by both H.P. Lovecraft and Fritz Leiber, a coin from Mel Brooks and the shirt which Ellison wore while writing his story "Pretty Maggie Moneyeyes".

Frances Wellman died on May 7, 2000. She was cremated and her ashes spread on the lawn of their home at Dogwood Acres in Chapel Hill, NC.

A son, Wade Wellman, died January 25, 2018, in Waukesha, Wisconsin.

== Works ==
Wellman once estimated his output of stories and articles at about 500, of which about 80 were in the fantasy and science fiction genres.

=== Science fiction and fantasy ===
- The Invading Asteroid (1929)
- Sojarr of Titan (1941)
- The Devil's Asteroid (1941)
- "Find My Killer" (1948 – as Manly Wellman).
- The Solar Invasion (Captain Future novel, Startling Stories Fall/46; reprinted in paperback in 1968)
- Devil's Planet (1951)
- The Beasts from Beyond (1950) [also known as Strangers on the Heights]
- Twice in Time (1957)
- The Dark Destroyers (1959) [short version of Nuisance Value, parts one and two (1938/39)]
- Giants from Eternity (1959)
- Island in the Sky (1961)
- Worse Things Waiting (Carcosa,1973) (short story collection) (Winner, World Fantasy Award for Best Collection, 1975)
- Sherlock Holmes's War of the Worlds [With Wade Wellman] (1975)
- The Beyonders (1977)
- The Valley So Low: Southern Mountain Stories (1987) (Ed. Karl E. Wagner, collection) Note: Wellman originally intended Valley So Low to be the title of a sixth Silver John novel, but his intervening death prevented him writing it. The title was applied instead to this collection of short stories.
- The Collected Stories of Manly Wade Wellman:
1. The Third Cry to Legba and Other Invocations (2000) (John Thunstone and Lee Cobbett stories)
2. The Devil is Not Mocked and Other Warnings (2001)
3. Fearful Rock and Other Precarious Locales (2001) (Judge Pursuivant and Sergeant Jaeger stories)
4. Sin's Doorway and Other Ominous Entrances (2003)
5. Owls Hoot in the Daytime and Other Omens (2003) (John the Balladeer stories)

=== Silver John collections and novels ===
- Who Fears the Devil? (Arkham House, 1963) (short stories)
  - John the Balladeer (1988) (Ed. Karl E. Wagner, revised collection containing all Silver John short stories)
  - Owls Hoot In The Daytime And Other Omens (2003) (Ed. Night Shade Press, also contains all Silver John short stories)
  - Who Fears the Devil? (Paizo Publishing, 2010) (reprint of AH edition with two additional stories)
- The Old Gods Waken (1979)
- After Dark (1980)
- The Lost and the Lurking (1981)
- The Hanging Stones (1982)
- The Voice of the Mountain (1984)

=== John Thunstone collections and novels ===
- Lonely Vigils (Carcosa,1981) (Thunstone and Judge Pursuivant short stories)
- What Dreams May Come (1983)
- The School of Darkness (1985)
- The Complete John Thunstone (2012)

=== Hok stories and collections ===
- "Battle in the Dawn" (1939)
- "Hok Goes to Atlantis" (1939)
- "The Day of the Conquerors" (1940)
- "Hok Draws the Bow"
- "Hok and the Gift of Heaven" (1941)
- "Hok Visits the Land of Legends" (1942)
- "The Love of Oloana" (1986)
- "Untitled Hok Fragment" (1989)
- Battle in the Dawn: The Complete Hok the Mighty (2010)

=== Young adult stories ===
- The Lion Roared. (Thrilling Tales) 1927.
- The Sleuth Patrol. 1947.
- The Mystery of Lost Valley. 1948.
- The Raiders of Beaver Lake. 1950.
- The Haunts of Drowning Creek. 1951.
- Wild Dogs of Drowning Creek. 1952.
- The Last Mammoth. 1953.
- Gray Riders: Jeb Stuart and His Men. 1954.
- Rebel Mail Runner. 1954.
- Flag on the Levee. 1955.
- To Lands Unknown. 1956.
- Young Squire Morgan. 1956.
- Lights over Skelton Ridge. 1957.
- The Master of Scare Hollow. 1957.
- Iron Scouts Trilogy
  - The Ghost Battalion: A Story of the Iron Scouts. 1958.
  - Ride, Rebels!: Adventures of the Iron Scouts. 1959.
  - Appomattox Road: Final Adventures of the Iron Scouts. 1960.
- Third String Center. 1960.
- Rifles at Ramsour's Mill: A Tale of the Revolutionary War. 1961.
- Battle for King's Mountain. 1962.
- Clash on the Catawba. 1962.
- The South Fork Rangers. 1963.
- The River Pirates. 1963.
- Settlement on Shocco: Adventures in Colonial Carolina. 1963.
- Mystery at Bear Paw Gap. 1964.
- The Specter of Bear Paw Creek. 1966.
- Battle at Bear Paw Gap. 1966.
- Jamestown Adventure. 1967.
- Brave Horse: The Story of Janus. 1968.
- Carolina Pirate. 1968.
- Frontier Reporter. 1969.
- Mountain Feud. 1969.
- Fast Break Five. 1971.

=== Other novels ===
- Cahena (1986) (historical novel)
- Candle of the Wicked (1960)
- A Double Life (movie tie-in) (Century Book Publications, 1947) Based on the screenplay by Garson Kanin and Ruth Gordon for the George Cukor movie starring Ronald Colman.
- Find My Killer (mystery) (Farrar, Straus and Giroux,1947)(as by Manly Wellman)
- Fort Sun Dance (western) (1955)
- Not At These Hands (mystery) (1962)
- Romance in Black (as by 'Gans T. Field'). (UK: Utopian Publications, 1945)

=== Plays ===
- Whom He May Devour. Written in the 1930s. Published in Whispers, 11/12 (1978).

=== Non-fiction ===
- "Everybody's a Character," The Writer, August 1948
- Giant in Gray: A Biography of Wade Hampton III of South Carolina. 1949.
- Dead and Gone: Classic Crimes of North Carolina. 1954. (Winner, Edgar Award for Best Fact Crime, 1956)
- Rebel Boast: First at Bethel, Last at Appomattox. 1956.
- Fastest on the River: The Great Race Between the Natchez and the Robert E. Lee. 1957.
- The Life and Times of Sir Archie. With Elizabeth A. C. Blanchard. 1958.
- The County of Warren, 1586–1917. 1959.
- They Took Their Stand: The Founders of the Confederacy. 1959.
- The Rebel Songster: Songs the Confederates Sang. 1959.
- Harpers Ferry, Prize of War. 1960.
- The County of Gaston. With Robert F. Cope. 1961.
- The County of Moore, 1947-1947. 1962.
- Winston-Salem:The Founders. 1966.
- Napoleon of the West: A Story of the Aaron Burr Conspiracy. 1970.
- The Kingdom of Madison: A Southern Mountain Fastness And Its People. 1971.
- The Story of Moore County. 1974.
- Winston-Salem In History, Vol. 7: Industry And Commerce 1766–1896. With Larry Edward Tise. 1976.
- A City's Culture: Painting, Music, Literature. 1976.

== Awards and honors ==
Wellman has been nominated for or won the following awards.

Year	Organization	Award title, Category	Work	Result	Refs
1946	Ellery Queen's Mystery Magazine	Readers Choice Award, Best Story	"A Star for a Warrior"	Won	
1956	Columbia University	Pulitzer Prize, Fiction	Rebel Boast	Nominated	
1956	Mystery Writers of America	Edgar Award, Best Fact Crime Story	Dead and Gone	Won	
1959	World Science Fiction Convention	Hugo Award, Best Short Story	"Nine Yards of Other Cloth"	Nominated	
1975	World Fantasy Convention	World Fantasy Award, Life Achievement		Nominated	
1975	World Fantasy Convention	World Fantasy Award, Best Collection/Anthology	Worse Things Waiting	Won	
1976	World Fantasy Convention	World Fantasy Award, Best Short Fiction	"The Ghastly Priest Doth Reign"	Nominated	
1976	World Fantasy Convention	World Fantasy Award, Life Achievement		Nominated	
1976	DeepSouthCon	Phoenix Award		Won	
1977	World Fantasy Convention	World Fantasy Award, Life Achievement		Nominated	
1978	World Fantasy Convention	World Fantasy Award, Life Achievement		Nominated	
1979	World Fantasy Convention	World Fantasy Award, Life Achievement		Nominated	
1980	International Fantasy Gamers Society	Balrog Award, Professional Achievement		Nominated	
1980	World Fantasy Convention	World Fantasy Award, Life Achievement		Won	
1981	Locus	Locus Award, Best Fantasy Novel	After Dark	15	
1983	First Fandom	First Fandom Hall of Fame		Won	
1985	British Fantasy Society	British Fantasy Award, Special Award		Won	
1989	Locus	Locus Award, Best Collection	John the Balladeer	5	
1996	North Carolina Writers' Network	North Carolina Literary Hall of Fame		Inducted	
2020	Worldcon	Retro Hugo Award, Hugo Award for Best Graphic Story	The Spirit: "For the Love of Clara Defoe"	Nominated	

== Adaptations ==
The Silver John stories were the inspiration for "Who Fears the Devil?", a 1994 recording by Joe Bethancourt that featured both traditional Appalachian folk songs that Silver John would have known, and Wellman's original lyrics that were in many of the Silver John stories, set to the traditional melodies that Wellman used as models.

Additionally, the progressive bluegrass band, The Dixie Bee-Liners, recorded an original song inspired by the Silver John stories titled "Yellow-Haired Girl" on their 2008 album "RIPE."

Much of the following information is taken from Mark Cannon's bibliography of Wellman.

Larroes Catch Meddlers:
Adapted for television for Lights Out as "The Meddlers", aired 7 July 1951
Director: Unknown
Screenwriter: Douglas Wood Gibson, Richard E Davis
Starring: John Carradine, E. G. Marshall, Dan Morgan

School for the Unspeakable:
Adapted for television for Lights Out as "The School for the Unspeakable", aired 7 January 1952
Director: Unknown
Screenwriter: Richard E Davis
Starring: Donald Buka, Don Hanmer, Leon Tokatyan, Dick Kallman, Maurice Kenney, Jason Jonson, John Gerstad, Harold Webster

The Valley Was Still:
Adapted for television for The Twilight Zone as "Still Valley," aired 24 November 1961
Director: James Sheldon
Screenwriter: Rod Serling
Starring: Gary Merrill (Paradine), Vaughn Taylor (Old Man), Ben Cooper (Dauger), Addison Myers (Sentry); Mark Tapscott (Lieutenant), Jack Mann (Mallory)

The Devil is Not Mocked:
Adapted for television for Night Gallery, aired 27 October 1971
Director: Gene Kearney
Screenwriter: Gene Kearney
Starring: Helmut Dantine (General), Francis Lederer (Master), Hank Brandt (Kranz)

Rouse Him Not:
Adapted for TV for Monsters, aired December 1988
Director: Mark Shostrom
Writer: Michael Parry
Starring: Laraine Newman, Terrance Evans and Alex Cord as John Thunstone.

Who Fears The Devil?
1972 feature film, edited and re-released in 1973 as The Legend of Hillbilly John
Producer: Barney Rosenzweig
Director: John Newland
Screenwriter: Melvin Levy
Starring: Hedges Capers (John), Susan Strasberg (Poly Wiltse), Denver Pyle (Grandpappy John), Severn Darden (Mr Marduke), Percy Rodriguez (Capt Lojoie H Desplain IV), R G Armstrong (Bristowe); Sharon Henesy (Lily); Sidney Clute (Charles); William Traynor (Rev. Millen); Harris Yulin (Zebulon Yandro); Alfred Ryder (O J Onselm); Chester Jones (Uncle Anansi); Val Avery (Cobart); "White Lightnin'" (themselves); "Honor Hound" (himself).

Film based on the character of Silver John. Two segments of the film were based on the stories O Ugly Bird and The Desrick on Yandro.

School for the Unspeakable
(on audiotape with Unfortunate Obsession by Matthew Costello)
Brilliance Corp 1997

Up Under the Roof
2010 short film (35mm, 20 minutes)
Producer: Danielle Stallings and Darin Read
Director: Darin Read
Screenwriter: Danielle Stallings and Darin Read
Starring: Jonathan Milliken, Shawnna Youngquist, Geoff Elliot, Jill Hill, Vince Froio, Alice Taylor and voice of Greg Finley

Based on Wellman's short story entitled "Up Under the Roof"

== Legacy ==
Karl Edward Wagner referred to him as "the dean of fantasy writers."

=== Manly Wade Wellman Award ===
The Manly Wade Wellman Award, named in his honor, is given out annually since 2013 by the North Carolina Speculative Fiction Foundation for "outstanding achievement in science fiction and fantasy novels written by North Carolina authors". The winners of the award are listed below.

- 2014 – The Shambling Guide to New York City by Mur Lafferty
- 2015 – Ghost Train to New Orleans by Mur Lafferty
- 2016 – Raising Hell by John G. Hartness
- 2017 – Steeplejack by A. J. Hartley
- 2018 – Scourge by Gail Z. Martin
- 2019 – Empire of Silence by Christopher Ruocchio
- 2020 – A Fall in Autumn by Michael G. Williams
- 2021 – Queen of None by Natania Barron
- 2022 – The Actual Star by Monica Byrne
- 2023 – Nettle and Bone by Ursula Vernon
- 2024 – The Night Field by Donna Glee Williams
- 2025 – Crypt of the Moon Spider by Nathan Ballingrud
