= Judge Pursuivant =

Character in stories by Manly Wade Wellman

Judge Keith Hilary Pursuivant is a fictional character and a supporting character in a series of stories (1938–1941) by American author Manly Wade Wellman (1903–1986). Pursuivant is a retired judge, author, and occult scholar who investigates mysterious supernatural events.

== Fictional character biography ==
Pursuivant is more a mentor to and helper of characters who have become embroiled in occult adventures than a hero per se. He first appears in the short story "The Hairy Ones Shall Dance", first published in 1938 in the weird-fiction pulp magazine Weird Tales. Pursuivant is described as a man of great height and girth, with bulbous eyes and nose and a drooping blonde moustache. He lives in a small town five hours from Washington, D.C., and is sufficiently wealthy to be attended by a manservant. He is intelligent and well-read in occult matters. A biography of Pursuivant is presented in the short story "The Black Drama", which presents him as having been born in 1891, retired in 1919, had studied at Yale and Oxford, and was decorated while serving in U.S. intelligence during World War I.

Until he passed it on to Wellman's later character, John Thunstone, Judge Pursuivant possessed a sword-cane with a silver blade said to have been forged by Saint Dunstan. The blade is inscribed with a text from Judges chapter 5 in the Vulgate, "Sic pereant omnes inimici tui" – "thus perish all your enemies". The sword-cane, which was especially potent against vampires, werewolves and other supernatural creatures, was passed on when Pursuivant's advanced age made him too weak to effectively wield it.

Although referred to in several stories, Judge Pursuivant only actually appeared in four short stories or novellas by Wellman: "The Hairy Ones Shall Dance" (1938), "The Black Drama" (1938), "The Dreadful Rabbits" (1940), and "The Half Haunted" (1941) – all originally published in Weird Tales – and as a supporting character in Wellman's 1982 Silver John novel The Hanging Stones and the John Thunstone novel The School of Darkness. All Wellman's Judge Pursuivant short stories have been collected in Lonely Vigils, and later in Fearful Rock and Other Precarious Locales, Night Shade Books (2001).

Judge Pursuivant also appears as a supporting character in the story "Chastel", not collected in the above volume but in volume one of that series (Third Cry to Legba and other Invocations), originally published in The Year's Best Horror Stories VII (1979).

Judge Pursuivant and his book, "The Unknown that Terrifies" is mentioned in "The Poltergeist of Swan Uppin", a short story of Jules de Grandin by Seabury Quinn.

== Bibliography ==
- "The Hairy Ones Shall Dance", Weird Tales, January, February, and March 1938
- "The Black Drama", Weird Tales, June, July, and August 1938
- "The Dreadful Rabbits", Weird Tales 1940
- "The Half Haunted", Weird Tales 1941
