= Jules de Grandin =

Fictional occult detective created by Seabury Quinn

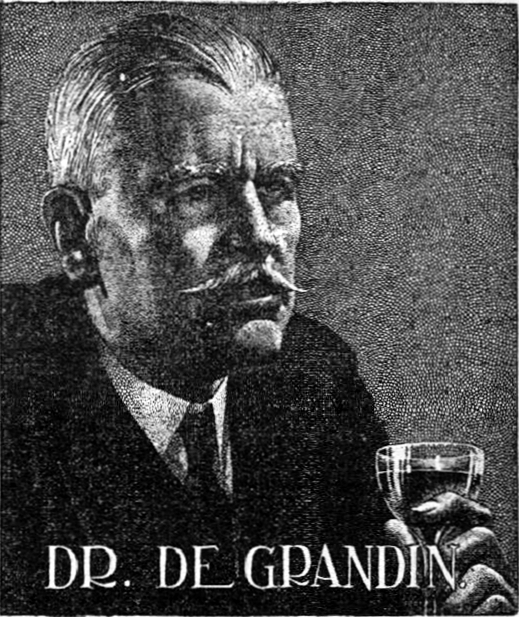
- Jules de Grandin, picture by Virgil Finlay
- First appearance: Weird Tales
- Created by: Seabury Quinn

In-universe information
- Occupation: Occult detective
- Nationality: French

Jules de Grandin is a fictional occult detective who, from 1925–1951, starred in 92 short stories and one novel by Seabury Quinn in the pulp magazine Weird Tales. In the pages of Weird Tales, Quinn also authored a serialized novel featuring de Grandin entitled The Devil's Bride, which deals with a young girl being kidnapped by satanists. In 1966, Arkham House published a collection of 10 de Grandin stories as The Phantom Fighter.

== Overview ==
In the stories, de Grandin is a French physician who is physically fit, with blonde hair and blue eyes. A former member of the French Sûreté, de Grandin becomes an expert in the occult and is eager to lend his aid and investigative skills when called. De Grandin lives in Harrisonville, New Jersey, and often new cases are brought to his attention by Jeremy Costello of the Harrisonville Police Department. Similar to Sherlock Holmes having a supporting cast of the landlady/housekeeper Mrs. Hudson and his aid and biographer Dr. Watson, de Grandin has a housekeeper named Nora McGinnis and is assisted on his investigations by Dr. Trowbridge, a fellow physician who narrates the stories. In his stories, De Grandin sometimes encounters otherworldly beings such as ghosts and werewolves, but in several instances he discovers the danger at hand is not supernatural as others suspected but simply the evil acts of ordinary people who are corrupt.

== Collected editions ==
In 1966 Mycroft & Moran published a ten-story, hardcover de Grandin collection, The Phantom Fighter. The collection included stories published between 1925 and 1930; Quinn provided an introductory essay. He also modernized the text in the stories.

Beginning in 1976, Popular Library issued five paperback collections of de Grandin stories, assembled and edited by Robert Weinberg. The collections included about one-third of the series as well as the only full-length de Grandin novel, The Devil's Bride. The volumes carried covers by Vincent DiFate and included interior illustrations by Stephen Fabian. Aside from The Devil's Bride, originally serialized in 1932, only three of the stories included had been published after 1930.

- The Adventures of Jules de Grandin (August 1976)
- The Casebook of Jules de Grandin (September 1976)
- The Skeleton Closet of Jules de Grandin (October 1976)
- The Devil's Bride (November 1976)
- The Hellfire Files of Jules de Grandin (December 1976)
- The Horror Chambers of Jules de Grandin (February 1977)

No further volumes in the series were released, though more were planned, and the initial volumes were never reprinted. Weinberg reprinted three more stories in some of his reprint fanzines.

A collection of six stories in French translation, Les archives de Jules de Grandin, was issued by the Librairie des Champs-Elysées in 1979.

The entire series of stories has been reprinted in a three-volume set from Battered Silicon Dispatch Box Press and in a five volume set called The Complete Tales of Jules de Grandin by Night Shade Books. The individual Night Shade volumes are

- The Horror on the Links (covering stories from 1925 to 1928)
- The Devil's Rosary (1929 & 1930)
- The Dark Angel (1931 to July 1933, including the novel The Devil's Bride)
- The Rival from the Grave (August 1933 to March 1938)
- Black Moon (June 1938 through to the last story in September 1951).

The Devil's Bride was issued in an Italian edition, Jules de Grandin: La Sposa del Diavolo, in 2015, translated by Nicola Lombardi and published by La Zona Morta.

== Weird Tales ==
de Grandin stories were often selected for the cover of Weird Tales, particularly when Margaret Brundage was the regular cover artist.

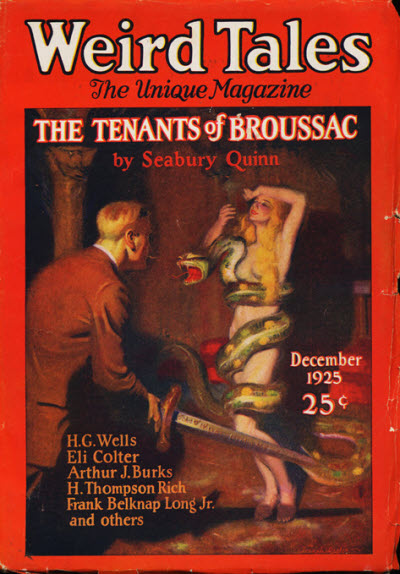

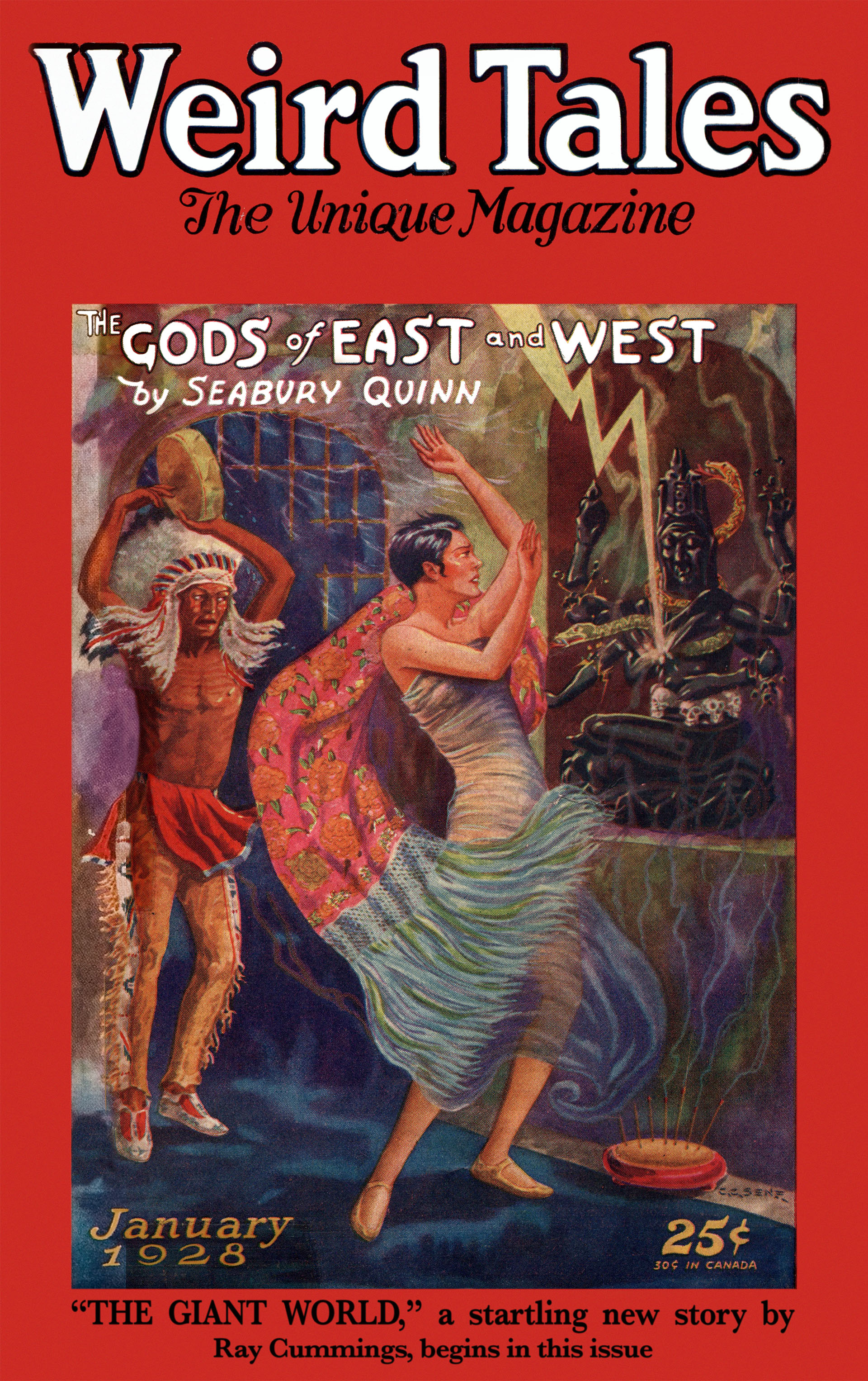

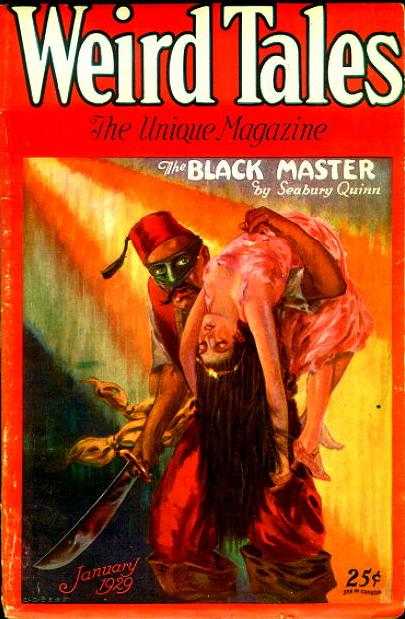

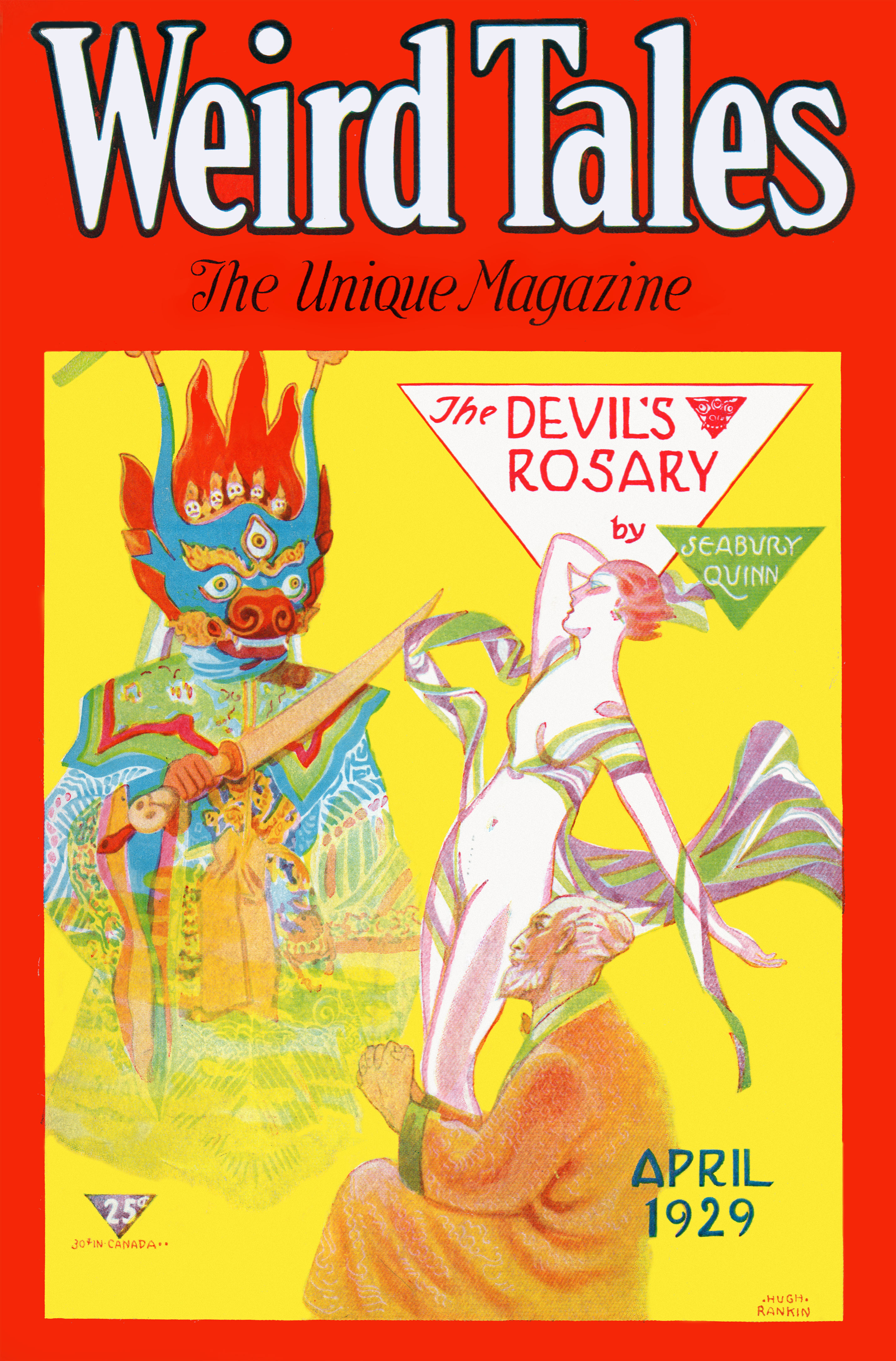

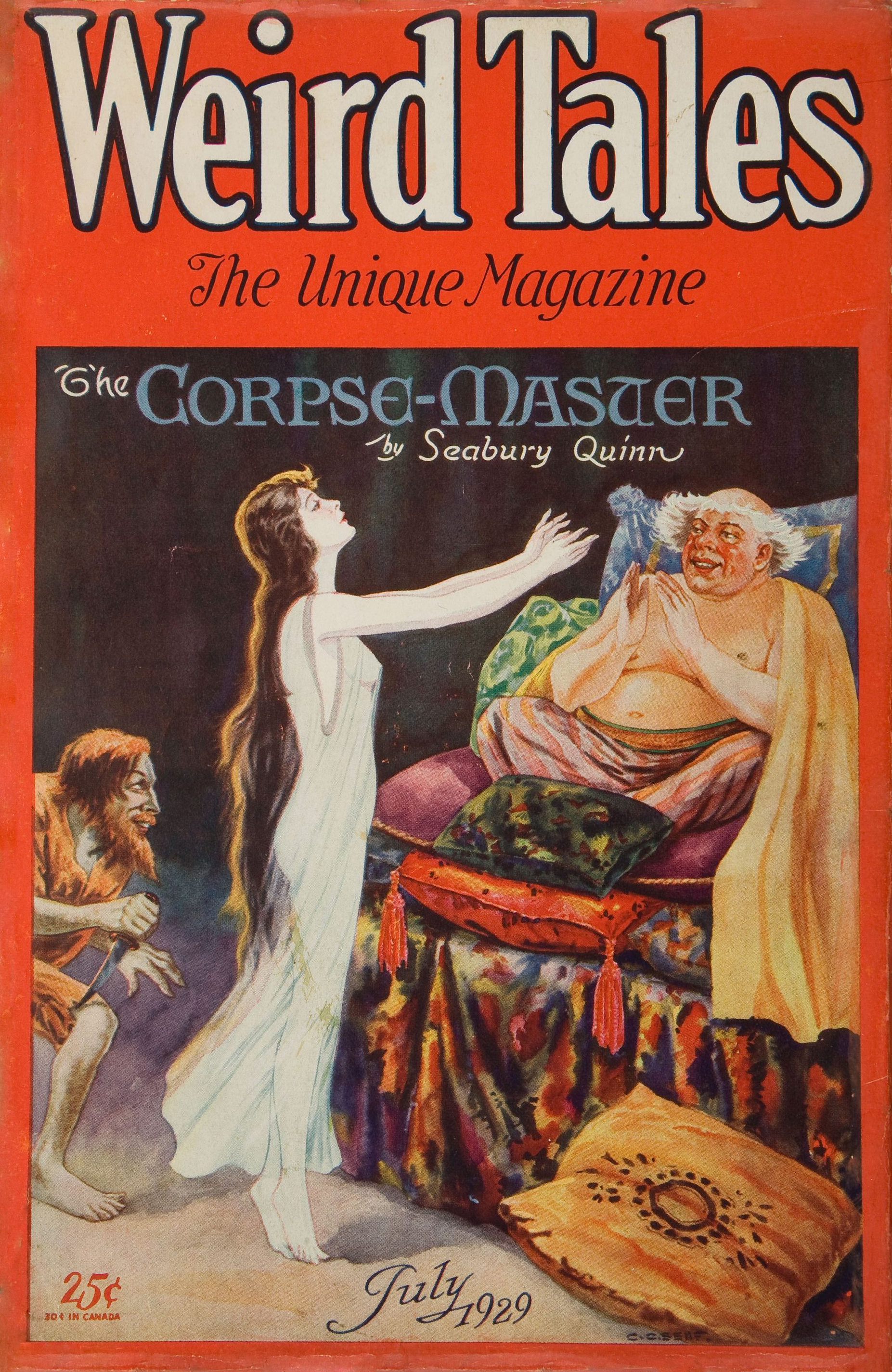

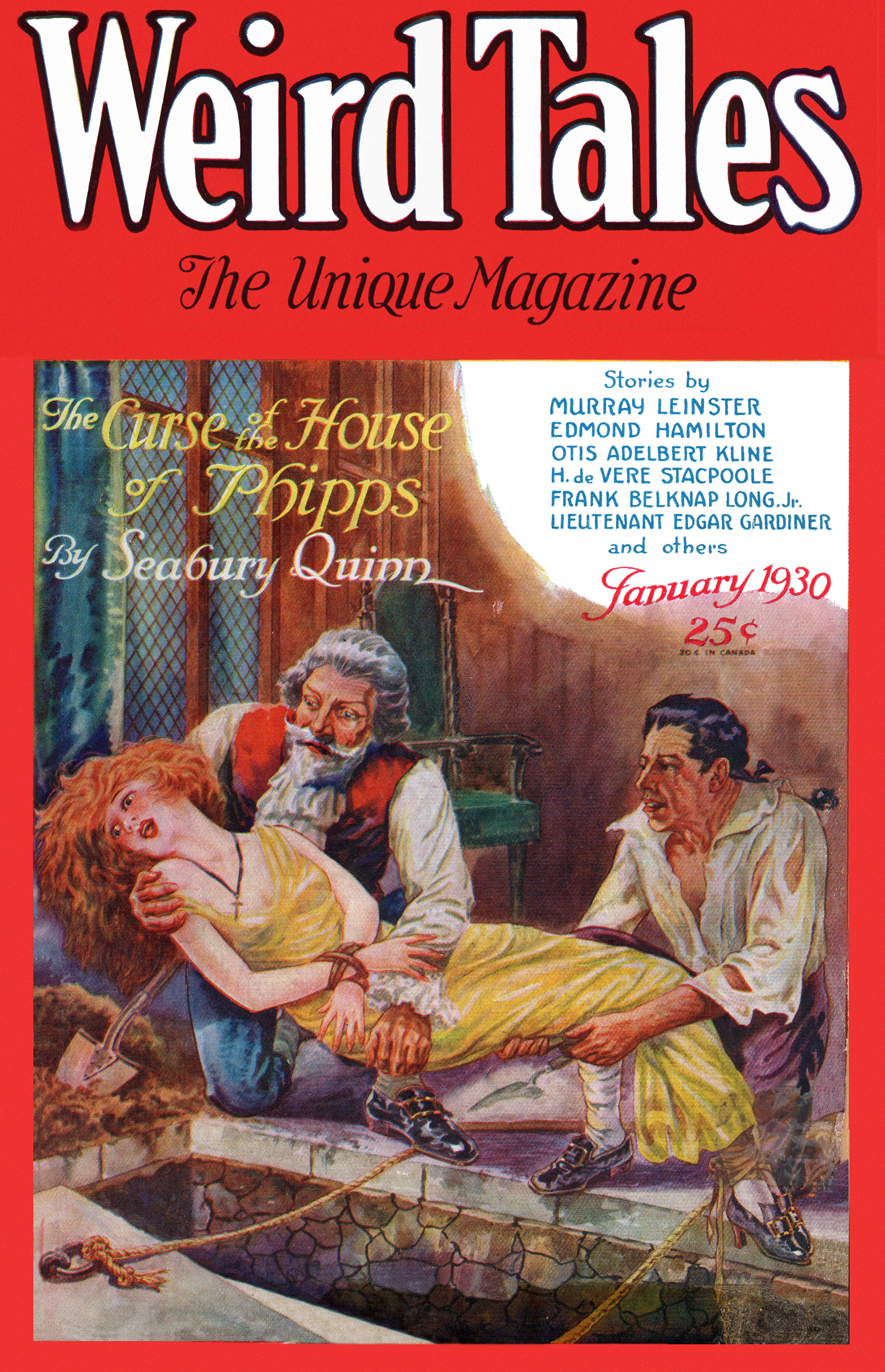

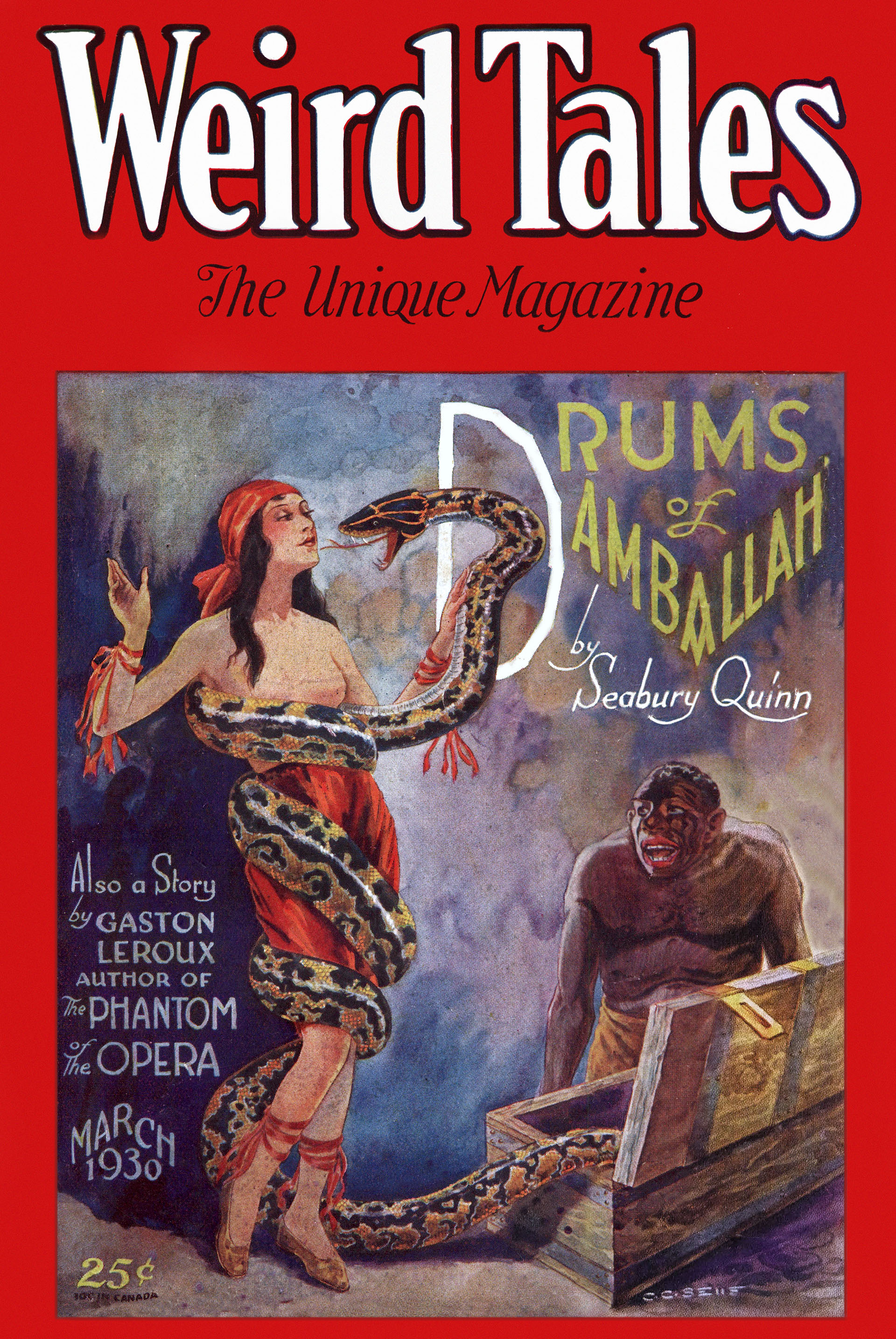

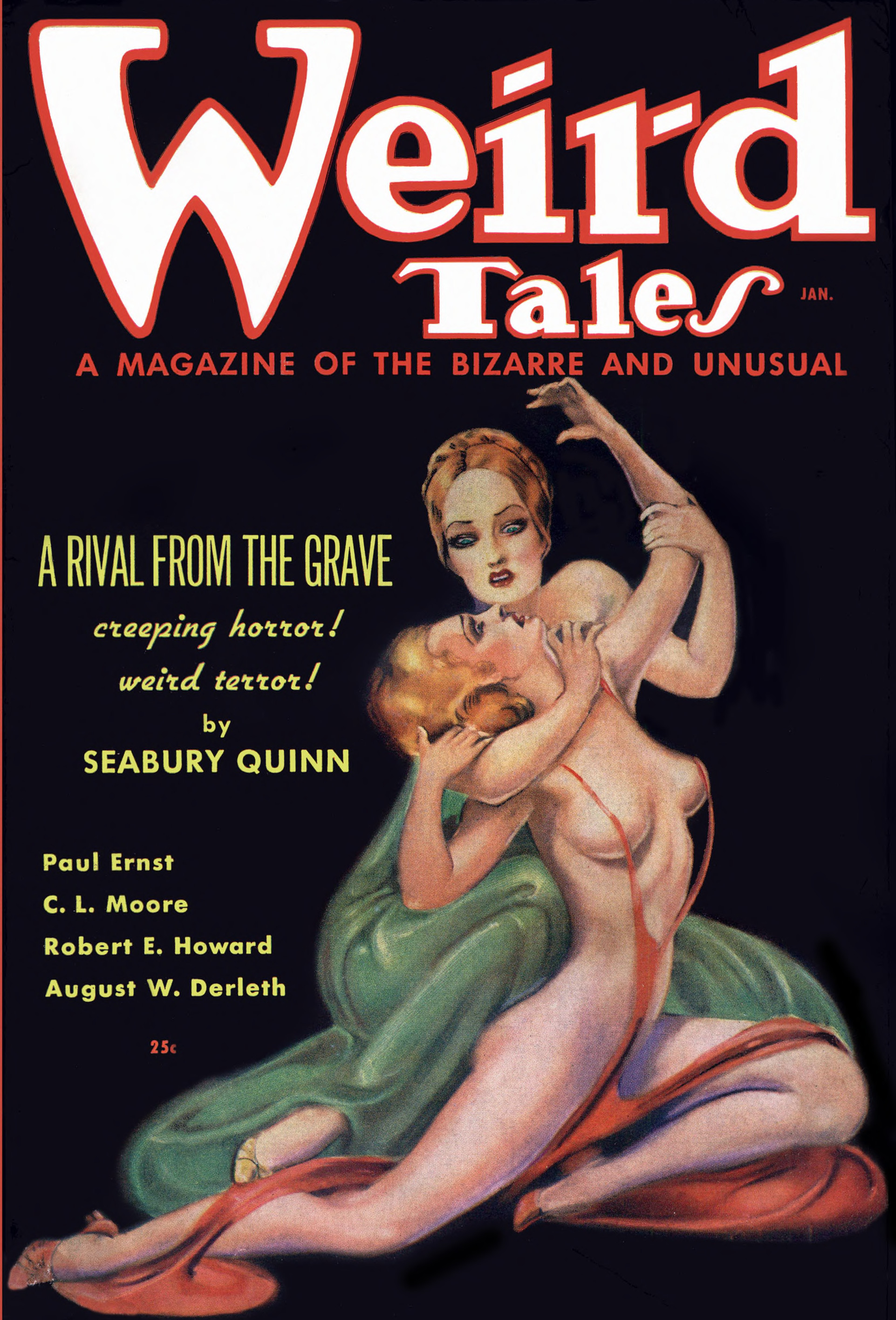

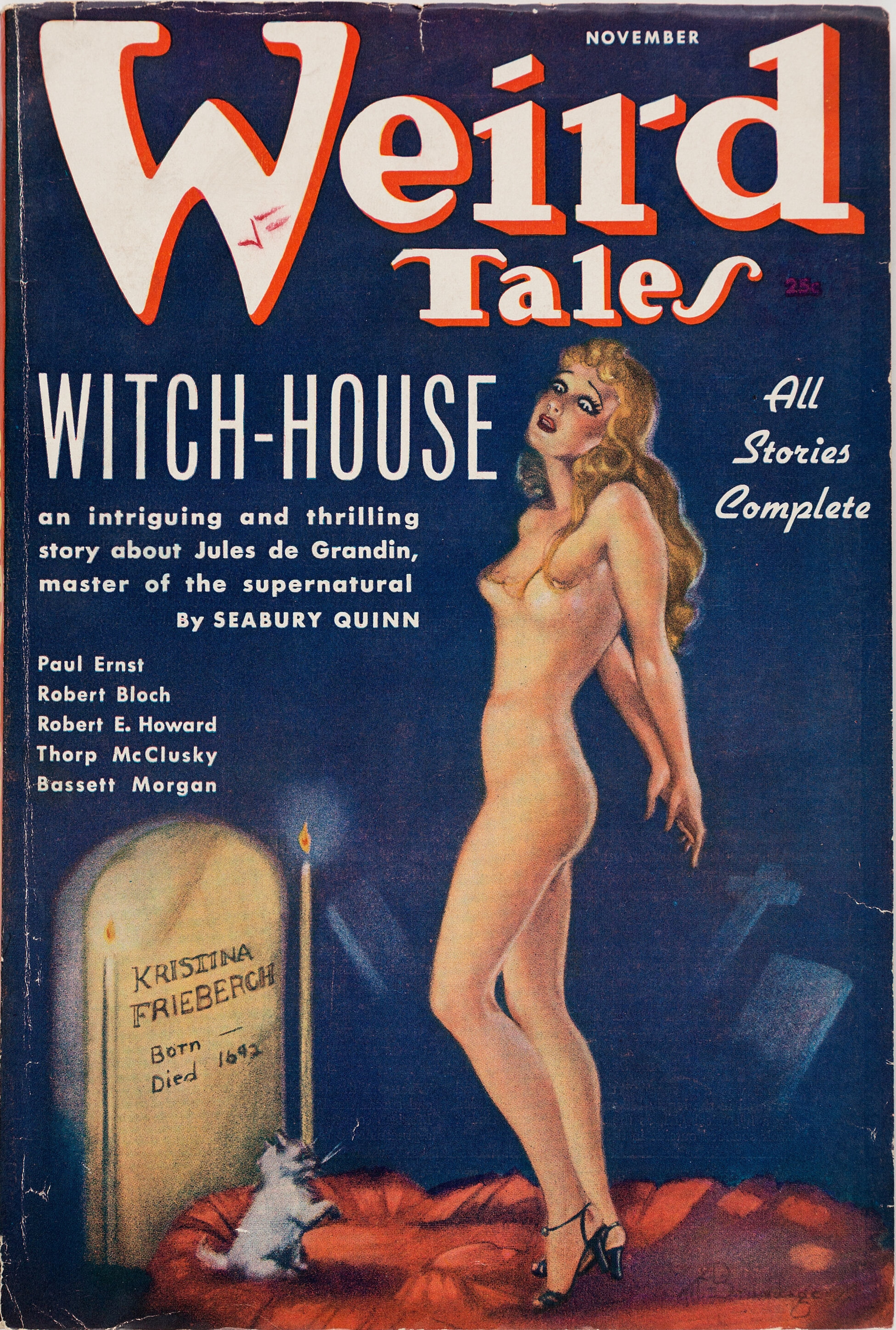

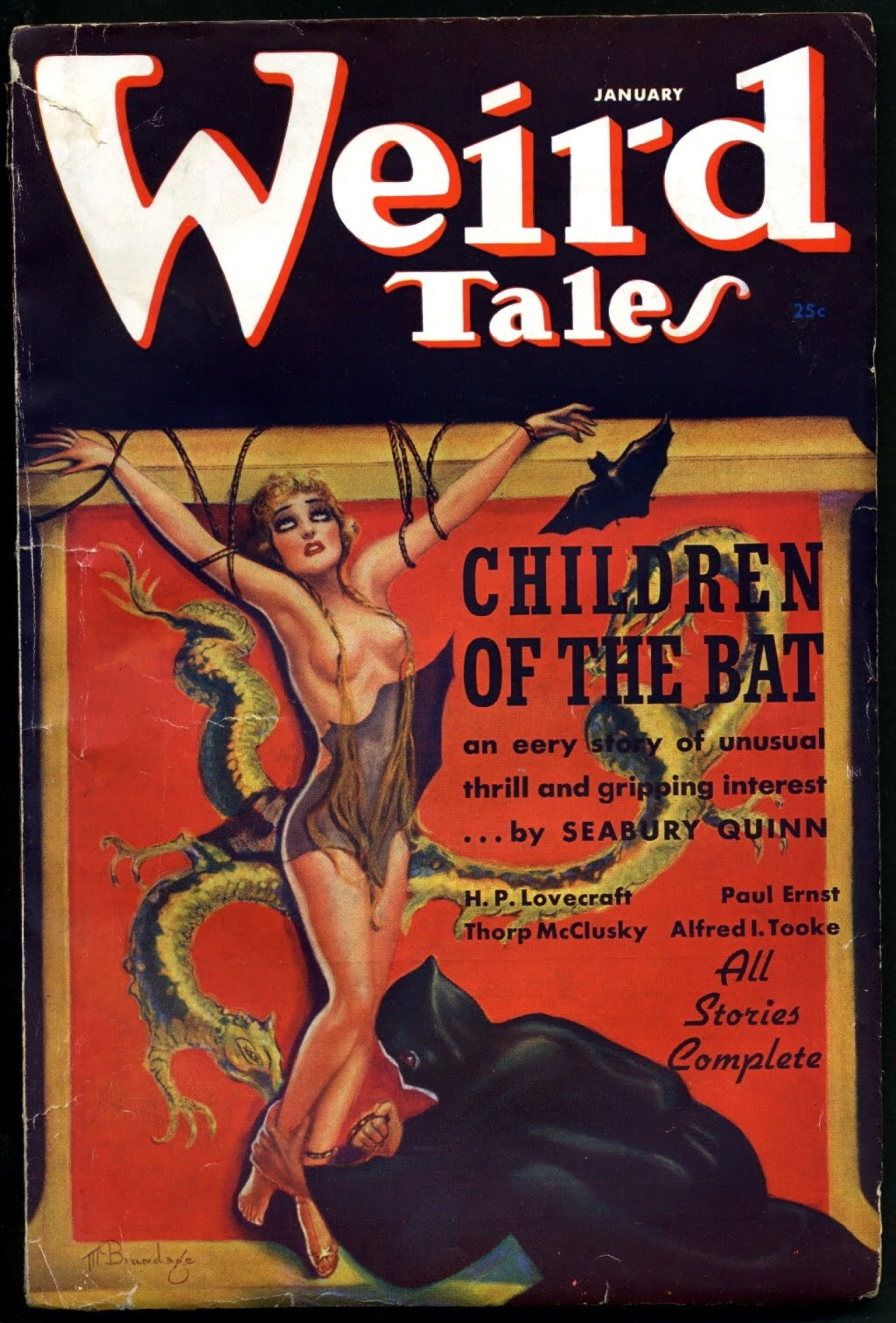

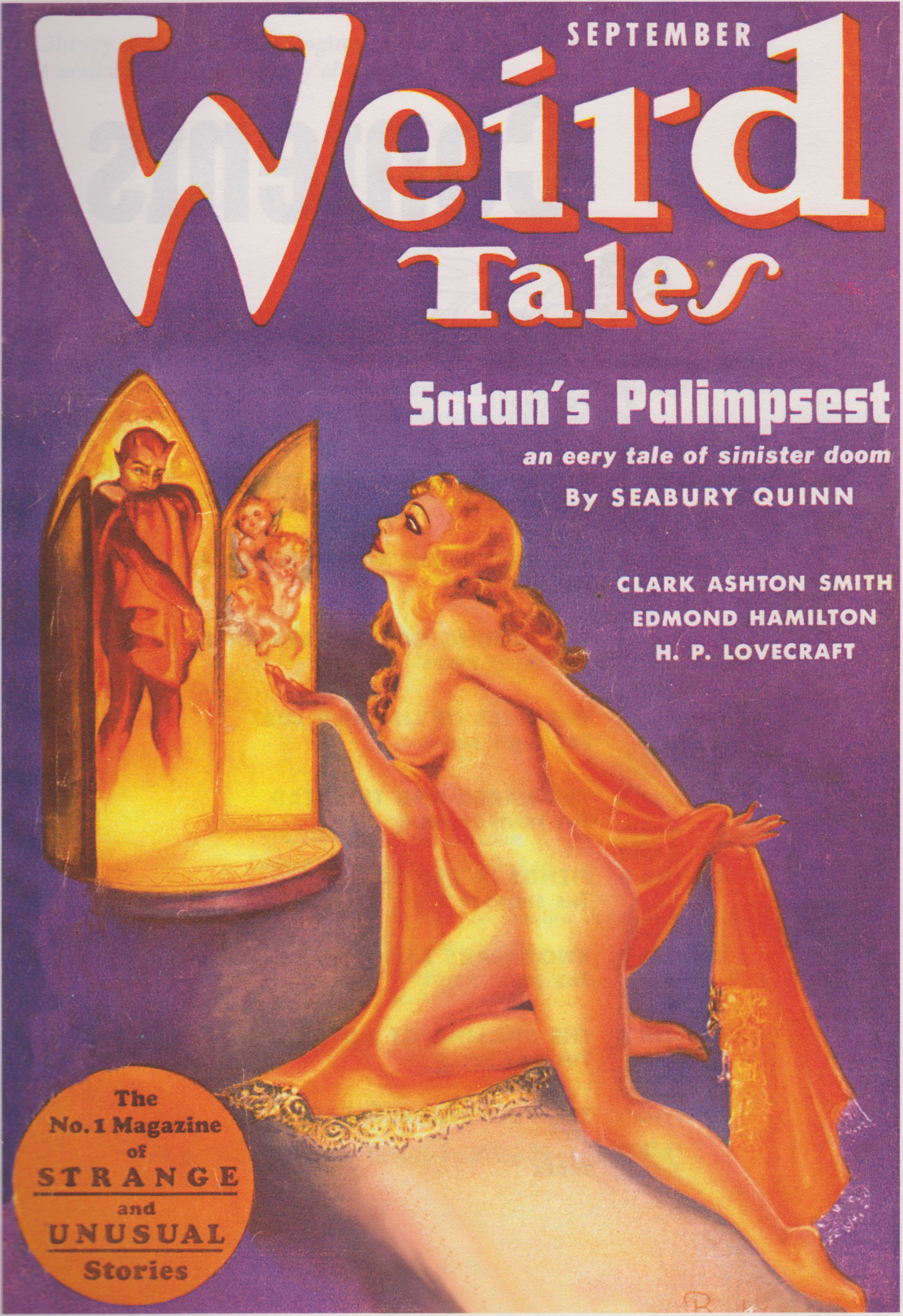

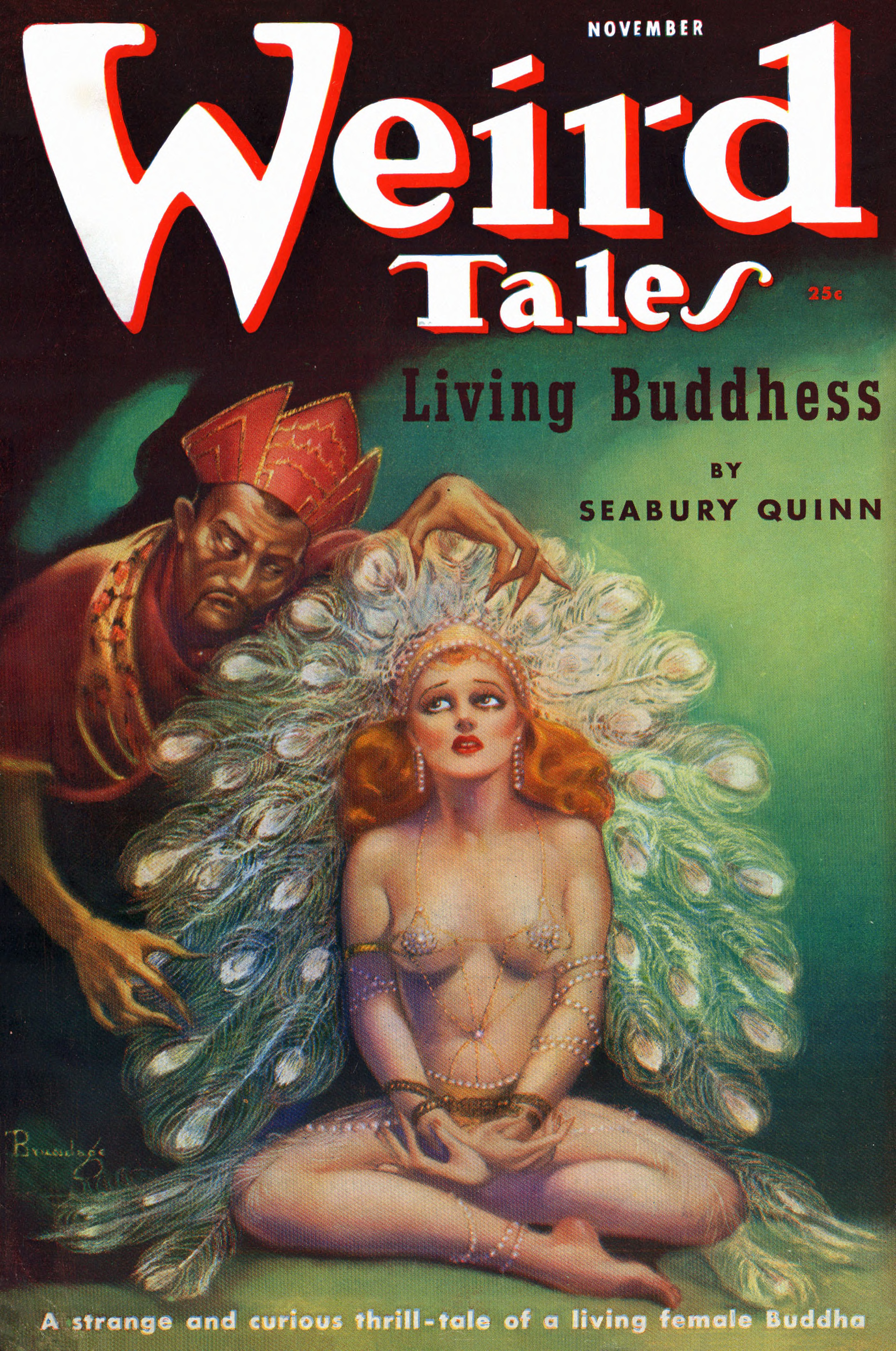

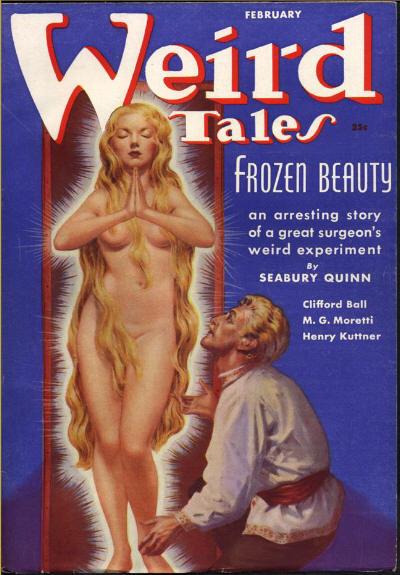

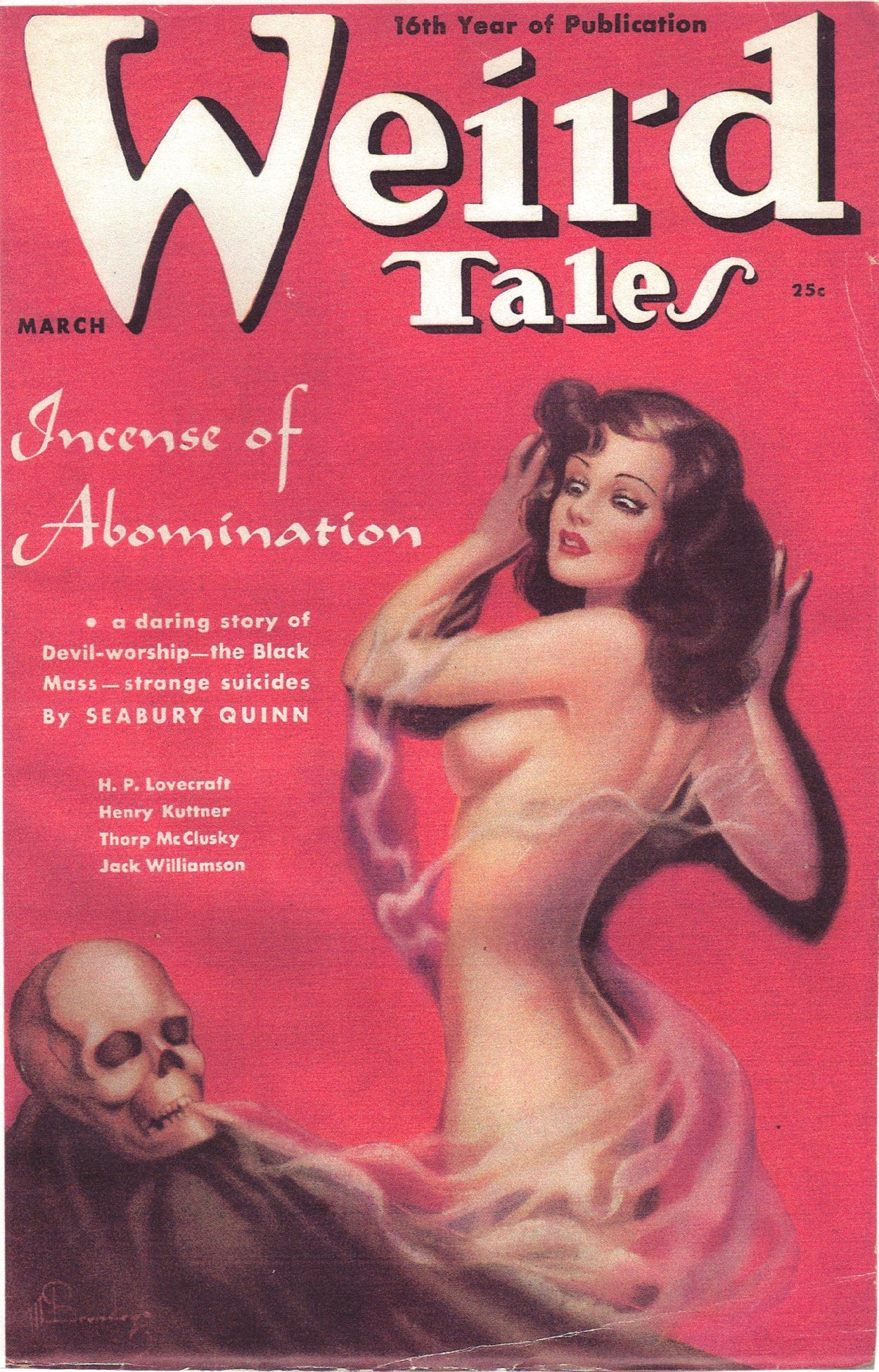

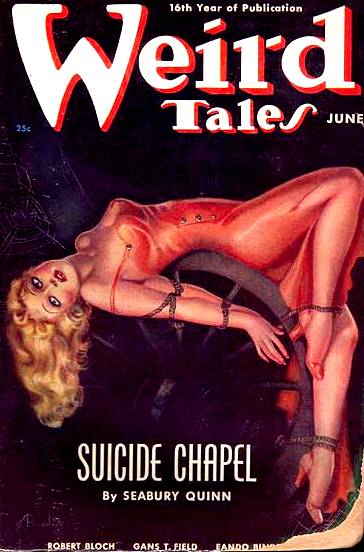

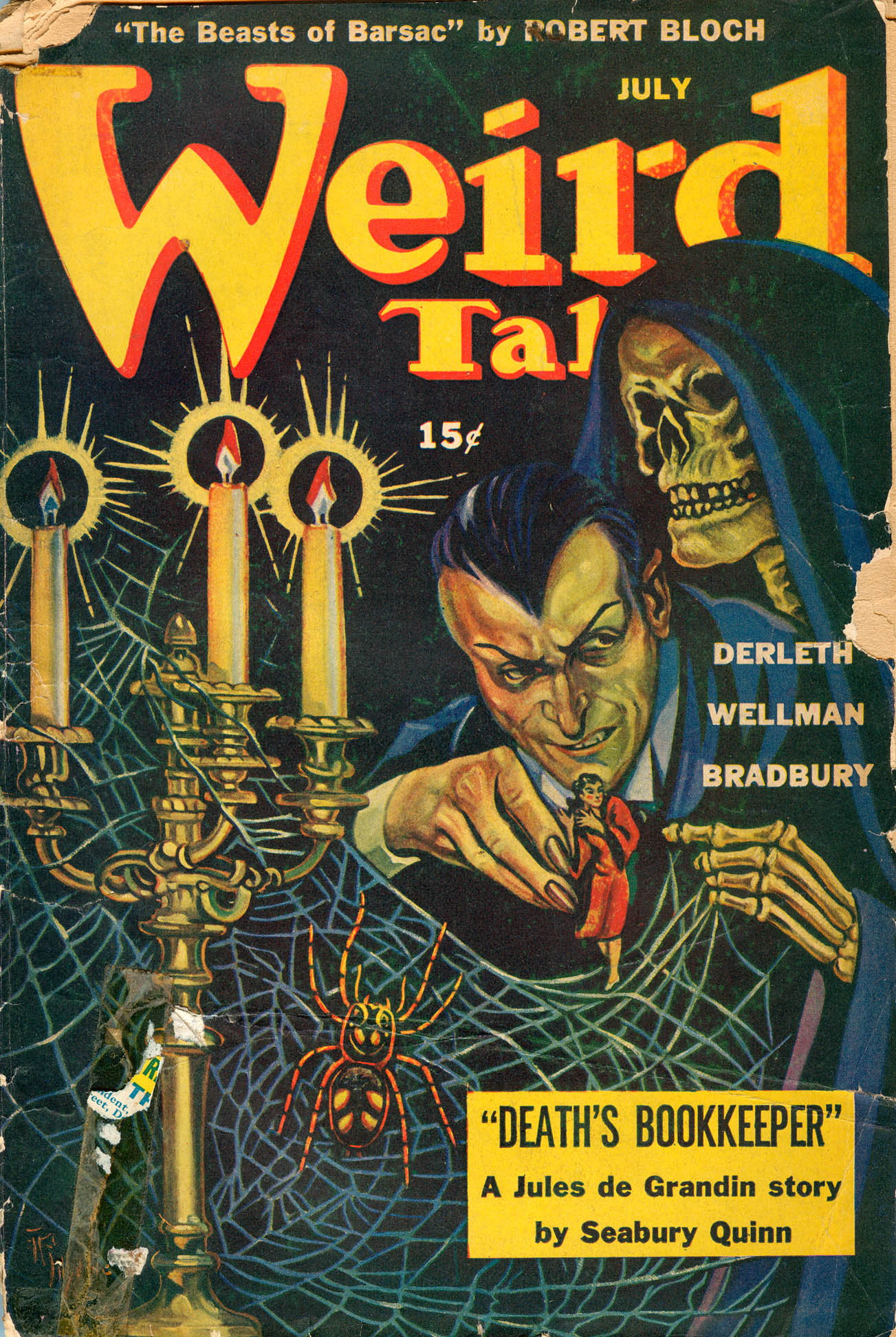

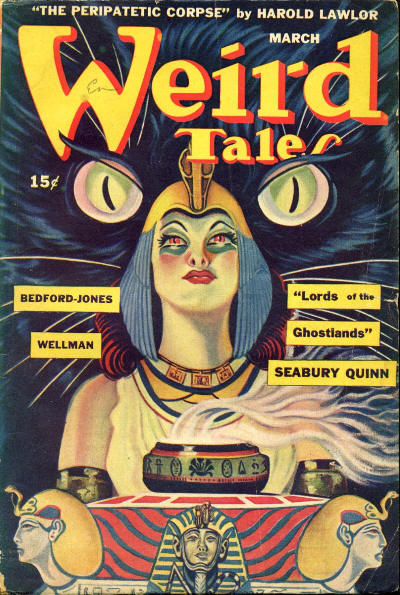

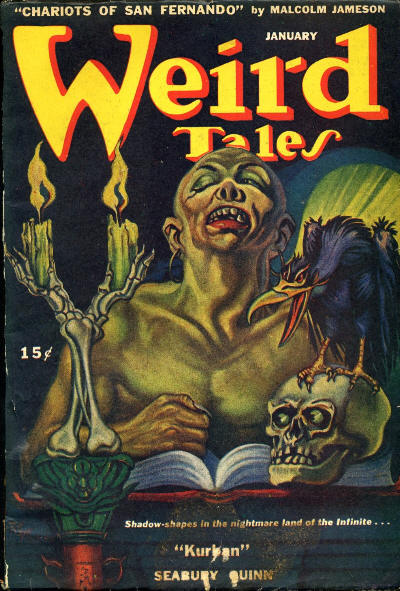
