= Scratches (video game) =

2006 video game

- Developer: Nucleosys
- Publisher: Got Game Entertainment
- Platform: Windows
- Release: GER: January 25, 2006; NA: March 2, 2006; EU: March 16, 2007
- Genre: Adventure
- Mode: Single-player

Scratches (Spanish: Scratches: La Guarida del Miedo) is a 2006 mystery horror adventure video game developed by Nucleosys and released by Got Game Entertainment. It is the first commercial adventure game ever to be made in Argentina.

== Plot ==
Wealthy construction engineer James T. Blackwood and his wife Catherine reside in Blackwood Manor on the outskirts of Rothbury, England. James is accused of murdering Catherine in 1963, after which the manor becomes owned by the couple's friend and long-time doctor Christopher Milton. James suddenly dies from a heart attack a few days later, though some in Rothbury believe he killed himself. The police close the case due to a lack of evidence. In 1970, Christopher inexplicably disappears without a trace.

In 1976, American author Michael Arthate becomes the manor's newest owner. Seeking seclusion to work on his next book, he instead becomes more interested in researching the house's history when he finds that the house echoes its horrific past, which manifests as a scratching sound that is particularly loud in the basement and near fireplaces.

In the end, Michael discovers that the scratching noises are caused by James and Catherine's severely deformed son Robin, who had been locked in the basement the whole time. Michael flees the house, later finishing his novel and becoming a prolific writer as a result of his experience.

=== Alternate endings ===
An early version of the game's ending saw Michael using a magic amulet to kill Robin and revive him as a fully functional human. The amulet would come with a puzzle, with Michael dying if the player could not solve the puzzle. Lead developer Agustin Cordes said the ending was "completely unfair in terms of design" and it was abandoned.

In the Director's Cut edition of the game, a side quest called "The Last Visit" continues the story of the house after Michael flees. An unnamed reporter is sent to uncover the mysteries of Blackwood Manor before its scheduled demolition. The place has become a scene of ruin, full of looting, graffiti, and vandalism. The reporter ultimately discovers Robin, who chases him until a dying Christopher appears back at the manor to seek forgiveness from Robin. Robin leaps onto Christopher and attacks him, giving the reporter the opportunity to escape. Blackwood Manor is later demolished and the reporter notes that the mystery of a mask found inside the home remains unsolved.

== Characters ==
- Michael Arthate: An American author whose successful debut novel Vanishing Town (a reference to Dark Fall) left him with enough wealth to purchase Blackwood Manor, achieving his longtime dream of owning a Victorian estate.
- James Thomas Blackwood: An eccentric gentleman who had always been a prominent figure in his native Rothbury, being one of the most successful construction engineers in the region.
- Catherine Lydia Blackwood: James' enigmatic wife who teaches English at a local school.
- Christopher Edward Milton: A close friend and long-time doctor of the Blackwood family.
- Eva Mariani: An Italian immigrant and aspiring photographer who was the Blackwood family's maid.
- William Bailey: A retired police chief who was in charge of the investigation into Catherine's death in the early 1960s. He was convinced of James' guilt but was never able to convict him.
- Jerry P. Carter: Michael's old friend and a successful real estate agent.
- Barbara Stiles: Michael's assistant who aids him with fan mail and contacts magazines around the world to offer them his short stories.
- Robin Blackwood: The son of James and Catherine Blackwood who was kept hidden from the public due to his deformities.

== Gameplay ==
Scratches uses a first-person perspective to navigate around the house. Using only a mouse, the player can access various rooms and other places in order to solve the mystery of both Blackwood and Milton's disappearances. It features music and sound effects by composer Cellar of Rats. The game is heavily influenced by H. P. Lovecraft and makes references to his works such as the Necronomicon, De Vermis Mysteriis, The Mountains of Madness, and the city of R'yleh. Michael also states that he moved to Rothbury from Lovecraft's hometown of Providence, Rhode Island.

== Development ==
Scratches was developed by a two-man team in Buenos Aires. Agustín Cordes did the programming and design, while Alejandro Graziani did the art direction. The developers opted to create their own game engine called SCREAM (Simple CReation Engine for Adventure Makers) rather than licensing a pre-existing engine. SCREAM utilised a combination of pre-rendered and 3D graphics, creating what the team referred to as "pseudo-3D", an effect which was hard to create using existing adventure game engines.

The game was designed to be non-linear. Its atmosphere has been compared to that of Resident Evil. Artwork from the game started being released in 2004. The Director's Cut saw changes analogous to those between Myst and its remake Realmyst.

Scratches went gold February 21, 2006.

== Release ==
Scratches was first released in North America on March 8, 2006 through game publisher Got Game Entertainment. However, Nucleosys had plans to release several international versions of the game worldwide.

A German version of the game has been available since March 2006 (published by Rondomedia), as has the Italian version Graffi Mortali (published by Power Up). A Greek version of the game is also available. A Russian version of the game has been available since May 2006 (published by Russobit-M). The Spanish version of the game (Rasguños) was announced but was never completed.

Nucleosys in 2007 released a "Director's Cut" version of Scratches, which includes an alternate ending and two more hours of gameplay. In addition to remastered sound, graphics and more. This version was announced on March 16, 2007. The title was part of Got Game Entertainment's mixed genre of games in 2007. On October 21, 2010, Meridian4 announced that they had signed a digital publishing agreement with Nucleosys for this game.

There were plans to create a Director's Commentary with a few additional features but as a result of Nucleosys' shutdown, it will not be released.

In 2012, Meridian4 released Scratches on Steam.

Versions for Linux and Mac OS X were planned, but were never released before the demise of the developer.

== Critical reception ==
Reception

Aggregate score
Aggregator	Score
Metacritic	67%

Review scores
Publication	Score
GameSpot	3.9/10
GameZone	7.4/10
IGN	7.7/10

Globally, Scratches sold more than 150,000 units by March 2007. By 2012, sales had reached roughly 250,000 units. Upon release of the director's cut, Wired asserted "You probably didn't play PC game Scratches".

In March 2006, Scratches ranked in the top 10 of Amazon.com's Top Sellers in Computer and Video Games, as well as in popular game indexes such as GameRankings.com.

Scratches received mixed reviews but overall achieved an average to high score from most review sites. According to Gameguru the game " received decent reviews". Most notably GameSpot gave the game a 3.9 and IGN gave it a 7.7, emphasising the game's mixed reviews.

GamesRadar noted that the games uses a "brooding, silent atmosphere" to "slowly build up the tension and terror". Game Chrinocle offered a positive review on the horror aspects of the game. IGN asserted that it was "average" and "decent-to-good".

== Legacy ==
After Nucleosys went out of business, Agustín Cordes would go on to found Senscape, who developed the horror game Asylum after a successful Kickstarter crowdfunding campaign.

Scratches is the first commercially released adventure game ever developed in Argentina.

== See also ==
- List of horror video games
