= Nucleosys =

Argentine video game developer

Nucleosys Digital Studio
- Industry: Video games
- Founded: 2003
- Defunct: 2009
- Fate: Dissolved
- Headquarters: Argentina
- Key people: Agustin Cordes, Alejandro Graziani, Alina Graziani
- Products: Scratches
- Website: http://www.nucleosys.com/

Nucleosys was a video game developer based in Argentina specializing in the adventure genre.

== History ==
The company was founded in 2003 by Agustin Cordes and Alejandro Graziani. The studio' s first release was Scratches in 2006. After this release, Nucleosys rebranded as Nucleosys Digital Studio.

On July 15, 2009 Nucleosys was announced to be disbanding. On August 3, 2009 the studio announced via its official site that it would be closing its doors soon. Agustin Cordes later went on to found Senscape.

== Games ==
Nucleosys's first project Scratches was released in North America on March 8, 2006.

- Scratches (2006)
- Scratches: Director's Cut (2007)
- Risk Profile: Federal Cases (2008)
- Untitled Project (unreleased)

About their final, untitled project, the only information ever released on the company's website was that it would have been a horror first-person adventure, taking place in a single location, over the course of one night, with several characters to interact with.
