= Milford Magazine =

- Former editors: Krista Gromalski, 2001 - 2005
- Categories: Popular culture, Art, Food, History, Life, Nature
- Founder: Sean Strub
- First issue: July 4, 2001
- Final issue: 2009
- Company: Pike Media Partners, LLC
- Country: United States
- Based in: Milford, Pennsylvania
- Language: English

Milford Magazine, a regional lifestyle publication, was published from 2001 to 2009. It produced approximately 10 issues per year and was distributed to over 200 high-traffic locations by Pike Media Partners, a media startup co-owned by Sean Strub. Krista Gromalski served as its Editor from 2001 through 2005.

While located in Milford, Pennsylvania, it was distributed throughout the Delaware River Highlands region: Pike, Wayne, and Monroe counties in Pennsylvania; the Orange and Sullivan counties in New York; and Sussex county of New Jersey.

== Mission ==
Milford Magazine's editorial mission was to re-brand Milford and the northern Pocono Mountains area as a distinct region known as the Delaware River Highlands, and to distance it from the traditional Pocono brand. The magazine's tagline was Navigating the Delaware River Highlands.

== Awards ==
Milford Magazine received a 2005 Community Service Award from the Upper Delaware Council in recognition of the publication's mission to cover topics of importance within the Delaware River Valley.
