= The Best of Avram Davidson =

1979 collection of short stories written by Avram Davidson

- Cover of first edition
- Author: Avram Davidson
- Cover artist: Roger Zimmerman
- Language: English
- Genre: Fantasy
- Publisher: Doubleday
- Publication date: 1979
- Publication place: United States
- Media type: Print (hardcover)
- Pages: xii, 201 pp.
- ISBN: 0-385-01384-1
- OCLC: 04538178
- LC Class: PS3554 .A924

The Best of Avram Davidson is a collection of fantasy, science fiction and mystery short stories, written by Avram Davidson and edited by Michael Kurland. It was first published in hardcover by Doubleday in January 1979. The book has been translated into French.

== Summary ==
The book collects eleven novelettes and short stories and a chapter from a novel, originally published in various magazines, with a preface by Peter S. Beagle, an introduction by editor Michael Kurland, and an afterword by the author.

== Contents ==
- "Foreword" (Peter Beagle)
- "Introduction" (Michael Kurland)
- "Or the Grasses Grow" (from The Magazine of Fantasy & Science Fiction, November 1958)
- "The Golem" (from The Magazine of Fantasy & Science Fiction, March 1955)
- "King's Evil" (from The Magazine of Fantasy & Science Fiction, October 1956)
- "The Ogre" (from If, July 1959)
- The Phoenix and the Mirror, Chapter 8 (from The Phoenix and the Mirror, Ace Books, 1969)
- "The Trefoil Company" (from Ellery Queen's Mystery Magazine, August 1971)
- "What Strange Stars and Skies" (from The Magazine of Fantasy & Science Fiction, December 1963)
- "The Necessity of His Condition" (from Ellery Queen's Mystery Magazine, April 1957)
- "The Sources of the Nile" (from The Magazine of Fantasy & Science Fiction, January 1961)
- "The Unknown Law" (from The Magazine of Fantasy & Science Fiction, June 1964)
- "Now Let Us Sleep" (from Venture Science Fiction Magazine, September 1957)
- "Help! I Am Dr. Morris Goldpepper" (from Galaxy Science Fiction, July 1957)
- "Afterword"

== Reception ==
The collection was reviewed by Joe de Bolt in Science Fiction & Fantasy Book Review, May 1979 (reprinted in Science Fiction & Fantasy Book Review: The Complete Series, Vol. I, No. 1-Vol. II, No. 13, January 1979-February 1980), Charles N. Brown in Isaac Asimov's Science Fiction Magazine, August 1979, and (in French) by Pascal J. Thomas in Fiction #319, 1981.

== Awards ==
The collection placed twelfth in the 1980 Locus Poll Award for Best SIngle Author Collection.

"The Sources of the Nile" received an honorable mention for the 1962 Hugo Award for Best Short Fiction.
