= Grania Davis =

American author and editor (1943-2017)

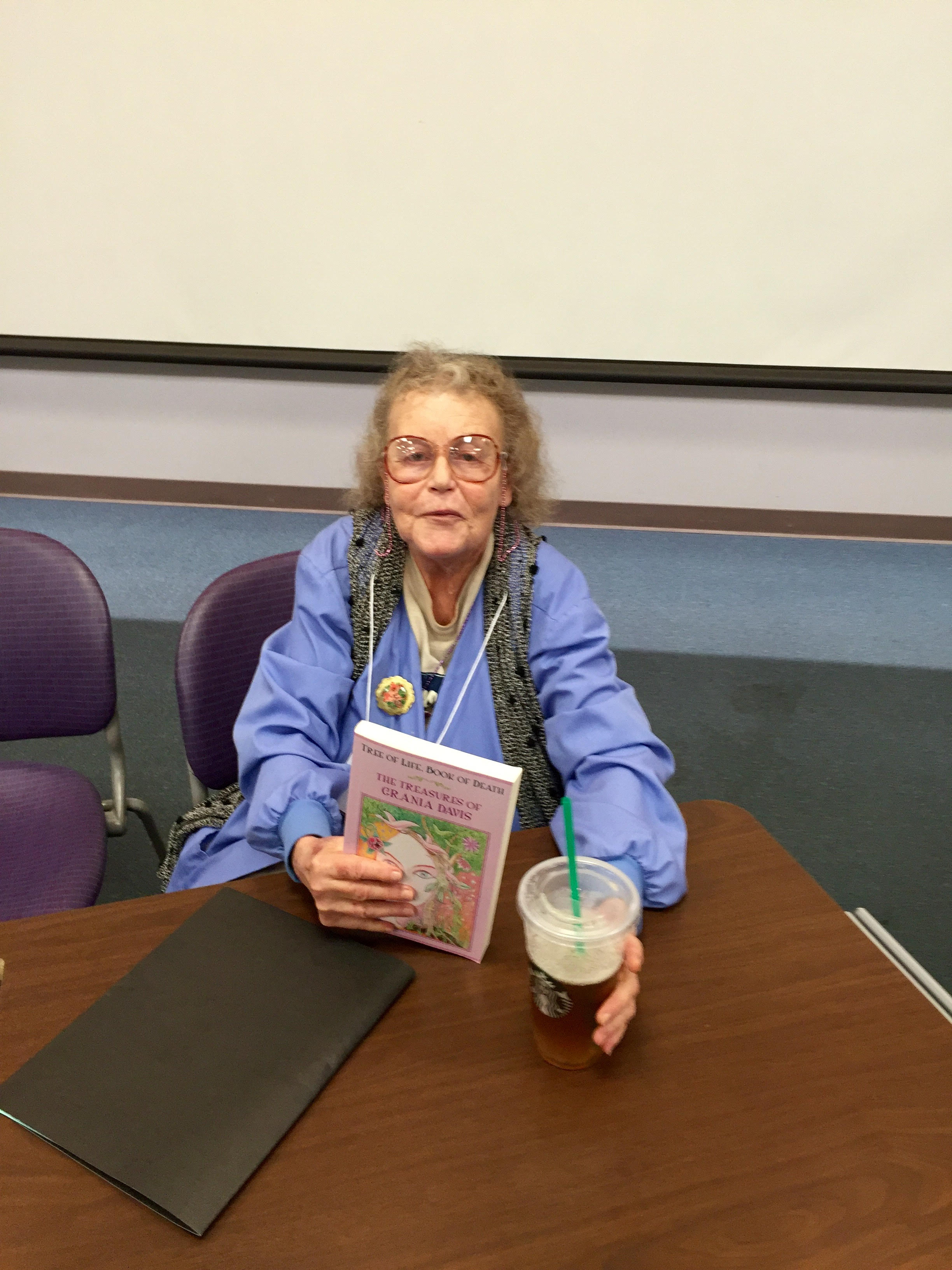
- Born: Grania Eve Kaiman; July 17, 1943; Milwaukee, Wisconsin
- Died: April 28, 2017 (aged 73)
- Occupations: Author, editor
- Spouse(s): Avram Davidson; Stephen L. Davis
- Writing career
- Notable work: The Boss in the Wall

Grania Eve Kaiman Davis (July 17, 1943 – April 28, 2017) was an American author and editor of science fiction and fantasy novels and short stories. She was the primary editor of the posthumously published work of her former husband, Avram Davidson. Her short stories have appeared in various genre magazines, anthologies, and "best of" collections. The Boss in the Wall (1998, Tachyon Publications with Avram Davidson) was nominated for a Nebula Award in the Best Novella category.

== Biography ==
Davis was born Grania Eve Kaiman in Milwaukee, Wisconsin, and grew up in Hollywood, California. She married Avram Davidson in the early 1960s in the home of fellow writers Damon Knight and Kate Wilhelm in Milford, Pennsylvania, and had a son with him, Ethan, in 1962. They lived in New York City and Amecameca, Mexico, before amicably dissolving their marriage and both moving to the San Francisco area. She lived in San Rafael, California, for many years with her second husband, Stephen L. Davis. She died on April 28, 2017.

== Bibliography ==
=== As author ===
- Proud Peacock and the Mallard (1976)
- Doctor Grass (1978)
- The Rainbow Annals (1980)
- The Great Perpendicular Path(1980)
- Moonbird (1986)
- Marco Polo and the Sleeping Beauty (with Avram Davidson, 1998)
- The Boss in the Wall: A Treatise on the House Devil (with Avram Davidson, 1998)
- Tree of Life, Book of Death: The Treasures of Grania Davis (short story collection, 2013)

=== As editor ===
- The Scarlet Fig: Or Slowly Through a Land of Stone (co-editor, with Henry Wessells, 2005)
- The Avram Davidson Treasury (co-editor, with Robert Silverberg, 1998)
- The Investigations of Avram Davidson (co-editor, with Richard A. Lupoff, 1999)
- Everybody Has Somebody in Heaven: Essential Jewish Tales of the Spirit (co-editor, with Jack Dann, 2000)
- The Other 19th Century (co-editor, with Henry Wessells, 2001)
- ¡Limekiller! (co-editor, with Henry Wessells, 2003)
- Speculative Japan (co-editor, with Gene Van Troyer, 2007)
