= Hotel Fauchere and Annex =

- U.S. National Register of Historic Places
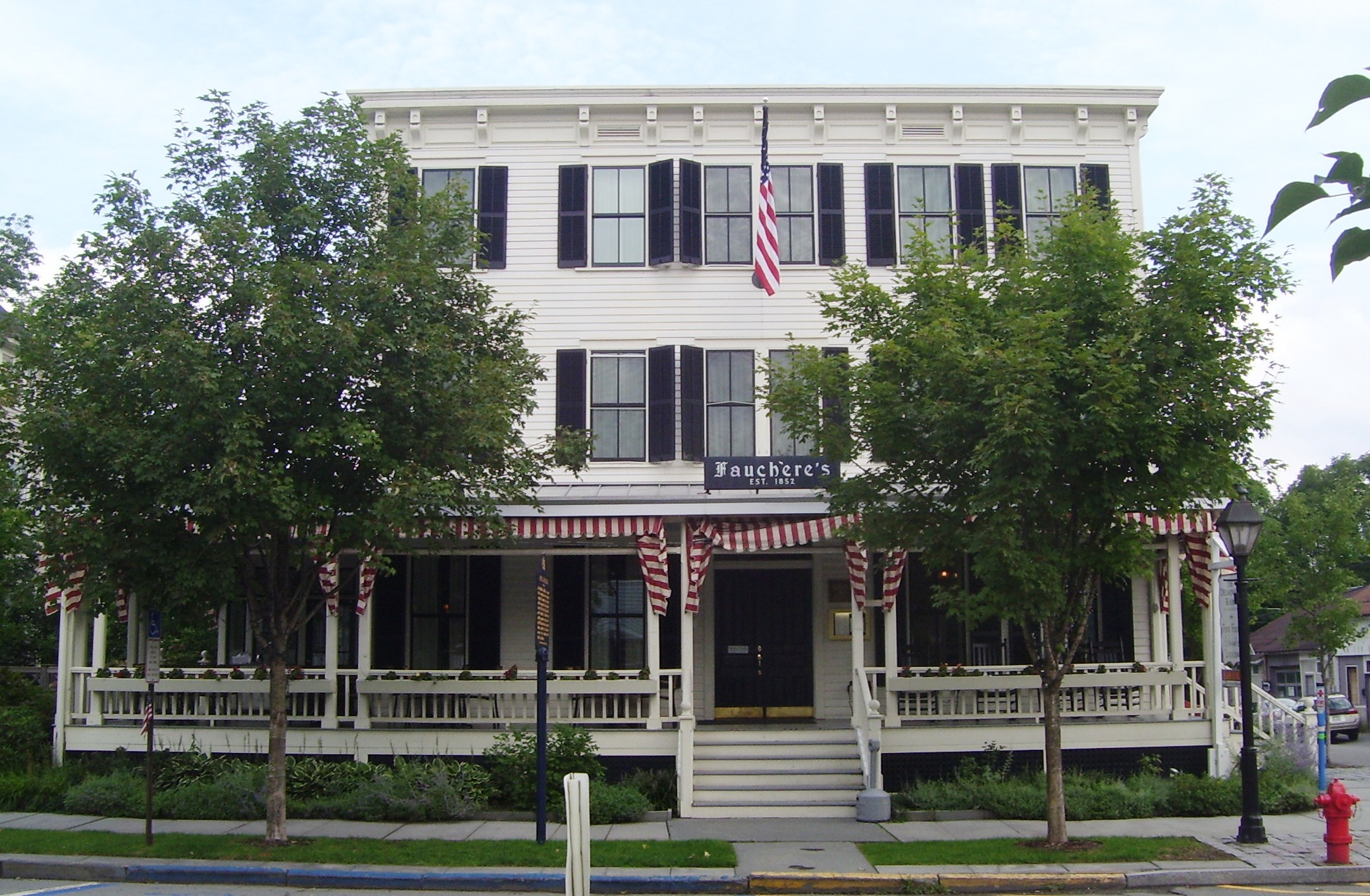
- Hotel Fauchere, August 2011

- Location within Pennsylvania Location within the United States
- Location: 401 and 403 Broad St., Milford, Pennsylvania
- Coordinates: 41°19′25″N 74°48′5″W
- Area: 0.7 acres (0.28 ha)
- Built: 1880, 1905
- Built by: Fauchere, Louis; Emerson, Dr. E.
- Architectural style: Italianate, Queen Anne
- NRHP reference No.: 80003626
- Added to NRHP: August 29, 1980

The Hotel Fauchere and Annex is an historic hotel which is located in Milford, Pike County, Pennsylvania.

It was added to the National Register of Historic Places in 1980.

As of 2021, the hotel was sold to and continues to be owned by Milford Hospitality Group.

== History and architectural features ==
The main building was built in 1880 by Louis Fauchère, and is a three-story, square, wood-frame building, which was designed in the Italianate style. It is six bays wide, has a flat roof, and a one-story porch. The annex was built in 1905, and was originally a private home. The rectangular Queen Anne-style building was purchased in 1907 by the hotel.

After the death of Louis Fauchère in 1893, the hotel was operated by his descendants until 1976.

== Restoration ==
In 2001, the property was purchased and restoration started. Local businessmen Richard L. Snyder and Sean Strub finished the restoration and opened the hotel in December 2006.
