= Peregrine: Primus =

1971 novel by Avram Davidson

- Cover of first edition
- Author: Avram Davidson
- Cover artist: Lena Fong Hor
- Language: English
- Series: Peregrine
- Genre: Fantasy
- Publisher: Walker & Co.
- Publication date: 1971
- Publication place: United States
- Media type: Print (hardcover)
- Pages: 174
- ISBN: 0-8027-5546-1
- OCLC: 219765
- Followed by: Peregrine: Secundus

Peregrine: Primus is a fantasy novel by American writer Avram Davidson, the first volume in his uncompleted Peregrine trilogy. It was first published in hardcover by Walker & Co. in 1971, with a paperback edition following from Ace Books in October 1977. The first ebook edition, which was also the first British edition, was issued by Gateway/Orion in June 2013. An audio edition was issued by Or All the Seas with Oysters Publishing in February 2022.

== Plot ==
In a fantastic, imaginary version of Eastern Europe during the decline of the Roman Empire in the sixth century, Peregrine, an illegitimate son of the king of Sapodilla, is sent into exile—his country's traditional way of helping clear the way for the succession of the legitimate heir. Accompanying him on his quest to seek his fortune is the eccentric sorcerer Appledore and the squire Claud, who conceals a keen intelligence under a pose of feeblemindedness. The three encounter the myriad perils of the era, particularly the many belligerently feuding primitive Christian sects, the roving imperial armies, surprisingly prurient vestal virgins, and wandering barbarian hordes, including what one critic calls "the jolliest Hun to ever pillage the countryside.". The novel ends in a cliffhanger as Peregrine is transformed into a peregrine falcon to save him from one of the religious sects.

== Reception ==
Paul Walker, writing in Galaxy, confesses himself intimidated by Davidson's erudition, and use of exotic vocabulary, noting "one's first reaction to a Davidson novel is to say, 'I've never read anything like this before.' Nothing could be more disconcerting to a critic, to whom comparisons are essential to making judgments, than to read a book whose originality, like a force of nature, precludes comparison and compels one to accept it one its own terms. ... Davidson's originality frolics and flaunts itself on every page maddeningly, taking an almost cosmic pleasure in itself." He observes that the author's "wit is broader here than in The Phoenix and the Mirror, with "shenanigans approachi[ing] slapstick farce," though he "keeps his tongue firmily in check and cheek." Walker mourns that "[t]the tragic thing about both of these books is that they were originally written as the first parts of trilogies, but ... the remaining books were not commissioned." He concludes that "[i]f you love Wodehouse, and Charlie Chaplin, you will probably get a kick out of Peregrine: Primues. If not, you won't."

T. A. Shippey, discussing the Peregrine novels in Salem Press Encyclopedia of Literary, decries the incomplete status of the series and the "number of loose ends in the plot [that will] never quite [be] tied off."

The book was also reviewed by Charlie Brown in Locus #104, January 14, 1972, James Blish in The Magazine of Fantasy & Science Fiction, July 1972, and John Boardman in The Alien Critic, November 1974.
