= Poz =

Poz or POZ may refer to:

- Paul Posluszny, American football linebacker
- POZ (magazine), magazine and website that covers HIV and AIDS
- Poznań–Ławica Airport, Poland (IATA airport code POZ)
- Malayo-Polynesian languages (ISO 639-5 code "poz")
