= Peregrine: Secundus =

1981 novel by Avram Davidson

- Cover of first edition
- Author: Avram Davidson
- Cover artist: Gary Ruddell
- Language: English
- Series: Peregrine
- Genre: Fantasy
- Publisher: Berkley Books
- Publication date: 1981
- Publication place: United States
- Media type: Print (paperback)
- Pages: 166
- ISBN: 0-425-04829-2
- OCLC: 7917906
- Preceded by: Peregrine: Primus
- Followed by: Peregrine Parentus

Peregrine: Secundus is a fantasy novel by American writer Avram Davidson, the second volume in his uncompleted Peregrine trilogy. It was originally published as two shorter works, the novelette "Peregrine: Alflandia" in The Magazine of Fantasy & Science Fiction v. 45, no. 2, August 1973, and the novella "Peregrine Perplexed" in Isaac Asimov's Science Fiction Magazine v. 4, no. 10, October 1980, which were combined to form the novel. It was first published in book form in paperback by Berkley Books in May 1981, and reprinted in September of the same year. It was reissued in trade paperback by Wildside Press in June 2000. The first ebook edition, which was also the first British edition, was issued by Gateway/Orion in December 2012. An audio edition was issued by Or All the Seas with Oysters Publishing in February 2022.

== Plot ==
In a fantastic, imaginary version of Eastern Europe during the decline of the Roman Empire in the sixth century, Peregrine, an exiled son of the king of Sapodilla, continues his quest to seek his fortune. The end of the previous novel left him transformed into an actual peregrine falcon; he now regains his humanity thanks to a spell cast by the King of Alfland's daughter. When the thieving dragon Smarasderagd despoils the king, Peregrine trails the beast to its hoard; both are ultimately called back by another spell. Afterwards, two old acquaintances of his own father make Peregrine lord of an isolated town, and he realizes that the dragon egg he carries may be about to hatch.

== Relation to other works ==
While the proposed final volume in the series, presumably to be titled Peregrine: Tertius, was never finished or published, the author's son Ethan Davidson wrote a concluding novelette, "Peregrine Parentus," based on his father's notes for the novel. It was published in the collection David&Son: Peregrine Parentus and Other Tales (Ramble House, 2016).

== Reception ==
T. A. Shippey, discussing the Peregrine novels in Salem Press Encyclopedia of Literary, decries the incomplete status of the series and the "number of loose ends in the plot [that will] never quite [be]tied off: Peregrine keeps hearing the warning to 'burn the boards of beechwood with the baleful signs,' but readers never learn exactly what these are. He also discovers in a dragon's hoard what appears to be the Crown of the Kings of Ephtland, but he never reaches Ephtland (although that town is mentioned often) or wears the crown. He is trying simultaneously to trace the whereabouts of his elder brother, but though he hears of him, the two never meet. Possibly Avram Davidson meant in the end to have his hero overcome some baleful hex, rescue his brother, and be crowned King of Ephtland, but this never will be known."

The book was also reviewed by Chris Henderson in Whispers, March 1982.

== Awards ==
Peregrine: Secundus placed thirteenth in the 1982 Locus Award for Best Fantasy Novel.
