= Limekiller =

2003 collection of fantasy short stories by Avram Davidson

¡Limekiller!
- Cover of first edition
- Author: Avram Davidson
- Cover artist: Douglas Klauba
- Language: English
- Genre: Fantasy
- Publisher: Old Earth Books
- Publication date: 2003
- Publication place: United States
- Media type: Print (hardcover)
- Pages: xx, 290 pp.
- ISBN: 1-882968-26-3
- OCLC: 53382368
- LC Class: PS3554 .A924 L45 2003

¡Limekiller! is a collection of fantasy short stories by Avram Davidson, edited by Grania Davis and Henry Wessells. It was first published in hardcover by Old Earth Books in November 2003. An ebook edition was issued by Gateway/Orion in July 2015.

== Summary ==
The book collects six novellas and novelettes featuring Davidson's adventurer character Jack Limekiller and set in the imaginary Central American colony of British Hidalgo (a fictionalized British Honduras). The stories were originally published in various magazines between 1976 and 1993. The collection includes a preface by Grania Davis, introductions by Lucius Shepard and Peter S. Beagle, and concluding material by Henry Wessells, the author, Grania Davis and Ethan Davidson.

== Contents ==
- "Preface: The Adventures of Jack Limekiller in a Far Countrie" (Grania Davis)
- "Introduction" (Lucius Shepard)
- "Introduction: Jack Limekiller" (Peter S. Beagle)
- "Bloody Man"
- "There Beneath the Silky-Tree and Whelmed in Deeper Gulphs Than Me"
- "Manatee Gal, Won't You Come Out Tonight"
- "Sleep Well of Nights"
- "Limekiller at Large"
- "A Far Countrie"
- "Afterwords" (Henry Wessells)
- "Along the Lower Moho (The Iguana Church)" (Avram Davidson)
- "Dragons in San Francisco - A Sequel" (Grania Davis)
- "Afterword" (Ethan Davidson)

== Reception ==
The collection was reviewed in Locus #514, November 2003, by Jonathan Strahan, who wrote: "(A) major book by a writer at the height of his powers that should have been published during his lifetime, but wasn't. It ranks easily amongst the best and most important books of the year..." The book was also reviewed by Lucius Shepard in The New York Review of Science Fiction, December 2003, Peter Heck in Asimov's Science Fiction, September 2004, and James L. Cambias in The New York Review of Science Fiction, September 2004.

== Awards ==
The collection placed tenth in the 2004 Locus Poll Award for Best Collection.
