= Collected Fantasies =

1982 short story collection by Avram Davidson

- Cover of first edition
- Author: Avram Davidson
- Language: English
- Genre: Fantasy
- Publisher: Berkley Books
- Publication date: 1982
- Publication place: United States
- Media type: Print (paperback)
- Pages: xi, 224 pp.
- ISBN: 0-425-05081-5
- OCLC: 8612966
- LC Class: PS3554 .A79 A6 1982

Collected Fantasies is a collection of fantasy short stories, written by Avram Davidson and edited by John Silbersack. It was first published in paperback by Berkley Books in June 1982.

== Summary ==
The book collects twelve novelettes and short stories by the author, originally published in various magazines, with an introduction by the editor.

== Contents ==
- "Introduction" (John Silbersack)
- "Sacheverell"
- "Help! I Am Dr. Morris Goldpepper"
- "Dragon Skin Drum"
- "The Lord of Central Park"
- "Or All the Seas with Oysters"
- "The Man Who Saw the Elephant"
- "Manatee Gal, Won't You Come Out Tonight"
- "The Sources of the Nile"
- "The Certificate"
- "The Golem"
- "The Cobblestones of Saratoga Street"
- "Faed-Out"

== Reception ==
The collection was reviewed by Debbie Notkin in Locus #259, August 1982, Len Hatfield in Science Fiction & Fantasy Book Review #7, September 1982, Thomas M. Disch in Rod Serling's The Twilight Zone Magazine, January–February 1983, and Nigel Richardson in Paperback Inferno v. 7, no. 1, August 1983.

== Awards ==
The collection placed eleventh in the 1983 Locus Poll Award for Best SIngle Author Collection.
