= The Enquiries of Doctor Eszterhazy =

1975 collection of short stories by Avram Davidson

- Cover of first edition
- Author: Avram Davidson
- Illustrator: John E. Westfall
- Cover artist: Franco Accornero
- Language: English
- Genre: Fantasy
- Publisher: Warner Books
- Publication date: 1975
- Publication place: United States
- Media type: Print (paperback)
- Pages: 206 pp.
- ISBN: 0-446-76981-9
- OCLC: 01996139
- LC Class: PS3554.A924 E57 1975

The Enquiries of Doctor Eszterhazy is a collection of historical mystery fantasy short stories by Avram Davidson featuring his scholarly detective character Doctor Eszterhazy and set in an imaginary European country. It was first published in paperback by Warner Books in December 1975. Its contents were later incorporated into the more comprehensive collection The Adventures of Doctor Eszterhazy (1991), which included five additional Eszterhazy stories written later but set earlier.

== Summary ==
The book collects eight novelettes and short stories by the author, some originally published in various speculative fiction magazines and others original to the collection, in addition to three maps by John E. Westfall illustrating the fictitious setting of Bella, capital of the equally fictitious empire of Scythia-Pannonia-Transbalkania, the empire itself, and its supposed position in the Balkans on the map of late 19th century Europe. The maps show the country as neighboring such other fictional states as Ruritania and Graustark, and, in an apparent error, place the Pannonia division at the opposite end of the empire from the historical Pannonia.

== Contents ==
- "Polly Charms, the Sleeping Woman" (from The Magazine of Fantasy & Science Fiction, v. 48, no. 2, February 1975)
- "The Crown Jewels of Jerusalem, or The Tell-Tale Head" (from The Magazine of Fantasy & Science Fiction, v. 49, no. 2, August 1975)
- "The Old Woman Who Lived with a Bear"
- "The Church of Saint Satan and Pandaemons" (from Fantastic, v. 25, no. 1, December 1975)
- "Milord Sir Smiht, the English Wizard"
- "The Case of the Mother-in-Law of Pearl" (from Fantastic, v. 24, no. 6, October 1975)
- "The Ceaseless Stone" (from New Venture #3, Winter 1975)
- "The King's Shadow Has No Limits" (from Whispers #8, December 1975)

== Reception ==
The collection was reviewed by Frederick Patten in Delap's F & SF Review, March 1976, John Boardman in Amra v. 2, no. 65, April 1976, Barry N. Malzberg in The Magazine of Fantasy & Science Fiction, September 1976, and Steve Fahnestalk in New Venture #4, Summer 1976.

== Awards ==
The collection won the 1976 World Fantasy Award for Best Collection.

"Polly Charms, the Sleeping Woman" was nominated for the 1976 Nebula Award for Best Novelette, and placed tenth in the 1976 Locus Poll Award for Best Novelette.
