= Masters of the Maze (novel) =

1965 novel by Avram Davidson

- First edition cover
- Author: Avram Davidson
- Cover artist: John Schoenherr
- Language: English
- Genre: Science fiction
- Publisher: Pyramid Books
- Publication date: 1965
- Publication place: United States
- Media type: Print (Paperback)
- Pages: 156
- OCLC: 4159938
- Dewey Decimal: 813

Masters of the Maze is a science fiction novel by American writer Avram Davidson, originally published in 1965 by Pyramid Books with a cover by John Schoenherr. The first UK edition, the only hardcover to date, was issued by White Lion in 1974. An American paperback reprint followed from Manor Books in 1976. Ebook editions appeared in 2012, from both Prologue Books and SF Gateway.

== Plot ==
The novel presents historical and fictional characters as "Guardians" of a maze which malignant, insect-like aliens are seeking to traverse in order to subjugate Earth.

== Reception ==
Algis Budrys praised the novel as "a very fine piece of light reading" despite having "marks of the short story writer all over it"; he declared that "no one but Davidson could have made of this wreck-save-the-world plot a thing of such polished beauty. It wafts of the incense of scholarship for its own sake . . . ". Judith Merril praised "Davidson's incredible ear for dialogue, his sharp eye for detail, and his resulting deft touch with a wide range of characterizations", but noted that the story "falls apart" in its closing sections, losing its "almost Carrollian" quality. P. Schuyler Miller described the novel as "rich", saying "This one has everything in it. . . . It has monsters. It has freemasonry. It has innumerable worlds. It has fully portrayed characters -- including a couple of monsters -- who pop up and vanish. It has a rather feckless hero who gets involved and blunders into all the feck he needs".

John Clute, in The Encyclopedia of Science Fiction, describes Masters of the Maze as "an intricate Parallel-Worlds adventure with sharply characterized humans and remote Secret Masters involved in barring interdimensional transit to a remarkably vivid insectoid Alien race".
