= Avram Davidson =

American writer (1923–1993)

- Born: April 23, 1923; Yonkers, New York, US
- Died: May 8, 1993 (aged 70); Bremerton, Washington, US
- Occupation: Novelist
- Spouse: Grania Davis
- Writing career
- Genres: Science fiction, crime fiction
- Notable awards: Edgar Award; Hugo Award; World Fantasy Award
- Website: avramdavidson.org

Avram Davidson (April 23, 1923 – May 8, 1993) was an American writer of fantasy fiction, science fiction, and crime fiction, as well as the author of many stories that do not fit into a genre niche. He won a Hugo Award and three World Fantasy Awards in the science fiction and fantasy genres, a World Fantasy Life Achievement award, and an Ellery Queen's Mystery Magazine short story award and an Edgar Award in the mystery genre. Davidson edited The Magazine of Fantasy and Science Fiction from 1962 to 1964. His last novel The Boss in the Wall: A Treatise on the House Devil was completed by Grania Davis and was a Nebula Award finalist in 1998. His posthumous collection The Avram Davidson Treasury won the Locus Award for Best Collection in 1999. The Encyclopedia of Science Fiction says "he is perhaps sf's most explicitly literary author".

== Biography ==
Davidson was born in 1923 in Yonkers, New York, to Jewish parents. He served as a Navy hospital corpsman (medic) with the Marine Corps in the Pacific during World War II, and began his writing career as a Talmudic scholar around 1950. As reported at the time in the February 20, 1962, Yonkers daily, the Herald Statesman, Rabbi Arnold Weinberger officiated at his wedding to Miss Grania Kaiman, which took place at the home of Damon Knight.

This made his conversion to Tenrikyo in the 1970s unexpected. Although he had a reputation for being quick to anger, Davidson was known among his friends for his generosity. His peripatetic life and career may have been due to a disinclination to finish what he began. His reputation among science fiction and fantasy readers peaked in the 1960s, after which he had a coterie of fans who (as with R. A. Lafferty) kept his reputation alive, especially after his death.

He was a member of the Swordsmen and Sorcerers' Guild of America (SAGA), a loose-knit group of Heroic Fantasy authors founded in the 1960s, some of whose works were anthologized in Lin Carter's Flashing Swords! anthologies.

While editing The Magazine of Fantasy and Science Fiction he lived in Mexico, and later in British Honduras (now renamed Belize). He lived in a rural district of Novato, in northern Marin County, California, in 1970, but later moved closer to San Francisco. He lived in a small house in Sausalito, at the southern end of Marin County next to San Francisco in 1971 and 1972, and it was there fans and friends were welcomed. He worked for a short time in the late 1970s as a creative writing instructor at the University of Texas at El Paso. In his later years, he lived in Washington state, including a brief stay in the Veterans' Home in Bremerton. He died in his tiny apartment in Bremerton on May 8, 1993, aged 70. A memorial service was held in Gasworks Park in Seattle.

He was survived by his son Ethan and his ex-wife Grania Davis, who continued to edit and release his unpublished works until her own death.

== Writing career ==
Davidson wrote many stories for fiction magazines beginning in the 1950s, after publishing his first fiction in Commentary and other Jewish intellectual magazines.

Davidson was active in science fiction fandom from his teens. Two of his novels were nominated for a Nebula Award: Rogue Dragon (1965) and Virgil in Averno (1987). The latter followed The Phoenix and the Mirror (1969) in a sequence about Vergil Magus, the magician that medieval legend made out of the Roman poet Virgil. Other speculative fiction includes the Peregrine novels, comic views of Europe shortly after the fall of Rome; the Jack Limekiller stories, about a Canadian living in an imaginary Central American country modelled after Belize during the 1960s; and the stories of Dr. Eszterhazy, an erudite Sherlock Holmesian figure living in the mythical Scythia-Pannonia-Transbalkania, the waning fourth-largest empire in Europe.

Lesser known and uncollected during his lifetime are his mystery stories, which were assembled after his death as The Investigations of Avram Davidson. These mystery stories frequently have a historical setting, and are intricately plotted. In addition, Davidson ghosted two Ellery Queen mysteries, And on the Eighth Day and The Fourth Side of the Triangle, and a true crime collection, Crimes and Chaos.

Other noteworthy works are his collaborations. In Joyleg, A Folly, written in collaboration with Ward Moore, a veteran of the American Revolutionary War (and of the Whiskey Rebellion) is found alive and very well in the Tennessee backwoods, having survived over the centuries by daily soaks in whisky of his own making to hilariously face the world of the 1960s. In Marco Polo and the Sleeping Beauty, co-written with Grania Davis, the background of Marco Polo's travels in the Mongol Empire is borrowed for an original story. After Davidson's death, Grania Davis also finished The Boss in the Wall, a claustrophobic horror novel that bears little resemblance to the work of any other writer.

Davidson also wrote dozens of short stories that defy classification, and the Adventures in Unhistory essays, which delve into puzzles such as the identity of Prester John and suggest solutions to them. His earlier historical essays were scrupulously researched, even when published by magazines just as happy to offer fiction as fact. Later essays were handicapped by a lack of resources in the libraries of the small towns where Davidson lived in the pre-Internet era, but are enlivened by the style and bold speculation.

Davidson's work is marked by a strong interest in history, with his plots often turning on what at first might seem like minor events. His characterization is also unusually in-depth for fantasy, and is often enriched by his ear for unusual accents.

Davidson's most obvious characteristics are his plotting and style. Very little may happen in a Davidson story, but he described it in detail. Hidden among the detail are facts or omissions that later become important to the outcome of the story. Especially in his later works, Davidson included elements that beginning writers are told to avoid, such as page-long sentences with half a dozen colons and semi-colons, or an apparently irrelevant digression in the opening pages of a story. He expects much from his readers, but delivers much to them.

== Bibliography ==
=== Kar-Chee series ===
- Rogue Dragon; available at Archive.org, Ace, 1965
- The Kar-Chee Reign, Ace Double, 1966

=== Vergil Magus series ===
A fantasy series set an alternate ancient Mediterranean world in which harpies, basilisks, and satyrs exist during the Punic Wars.

- The Phoenix and the Mirror, Doubleday, 1969; issued in 1970 as The Phoenix and the Mirror or, The Enigmatic Speculum in the Ace Science Fiction Specials series
- Vergil in Averno, Doubleday, 1987
- The Scarlet Fig; or Slowly through a Land of Stone; Rose Press, 2005

=== Peregrine series ===
- Peregrine: Primus, Walker, 1971
- Peregrine: Secundus, Berkley, 1981

=== Standalone novels ===
- Mutiny in Space, Pyramid, 1964
- Rork!, Berkley, 1965
- Masters of the Maze, Pyramid, 1965
- Clash of Star-Kings, Ace Double, 1966
- The Enemy of My Enemy, Berkley, 1966
- The Island Under the Earth, original to the Ace Science Fiction Specials series, 1969
- Ursus of Ultima Thule, Avon, 1973
- Joyleg, Pyramid, 1962 (with Ward Moore)
- The Whenabouts of Burr, DAW Books, 1975 (with Michael Kurland)
- Marco Polo and the Sleeping Beauty, Baen, 1987 (with Grania Davis)
- The Boss in the Wall, A Treatise on the House Devil, Tachyon Publications, 1998 (with Grania Davis)

=== Short story collections ===
- Or All the Seas with Oysters, Berkley, 1962
- Crimes and Chaos, Regency, 1962
- What Strange Stars and Skies, Ace, 1965
- Strange Seas and Shores, Doubleday, 1971
- The Enquiries of Doctor Eszterhazy, Warner, 1975
- The Redward Edward Papers, Doubleday, 1978
- The Best of Avram Davidson, Doubleday, 1979
- Collected Fantasies, Berkley, 1982
- The Adventures of Doctor Eszterhazy, Owlswick, 1990
- The Avram Davidson Treasury, Tor, 1998
- The Investigations of Avram Davidson, Owlswick, 1999 [collected mystery stories]
- Everybody Has Somebody in Heaven, Devora, 2000
- The Other Nineteenth Century, Tor, 2001
- ¡Limekiller!, Old Earth Books, 2003

=== Nonfiction ===
- Adventures in Unhistory, Owlswick, 1993

=== Ghost-written with Ellery Queen ===
- And on the Eighth Day, Random House, 1964
- The Fourth Side of the Triangle, Random House, 1965
