= Jervis Gordon Grist Mill Historic District =

Historic district in Pennsylvania, United States

- U.S. National Register of Historic Places
- U.S. Historic district
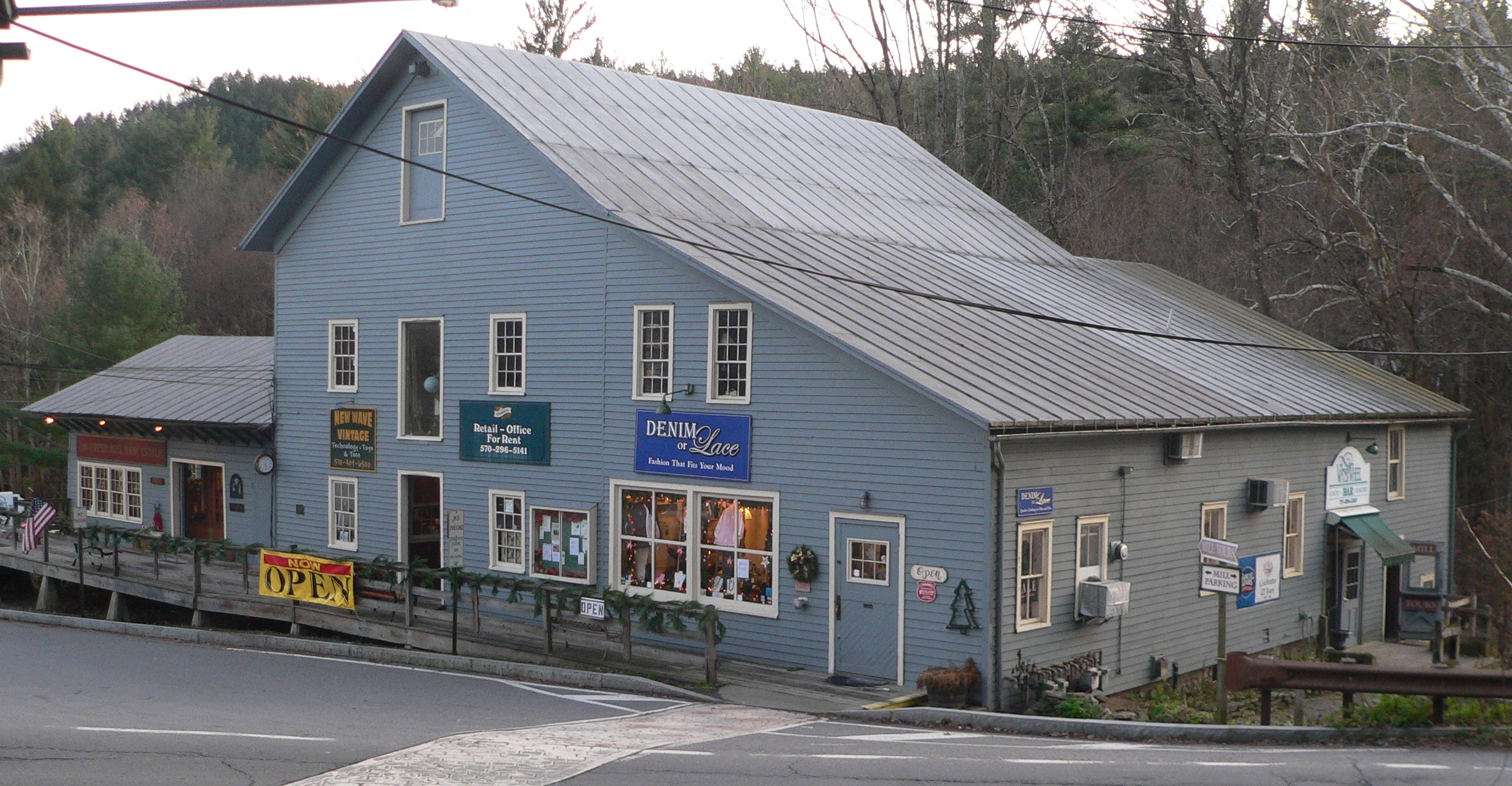
- Upper Mill

- Location within Pennsylvania Location within the United States
- Location: Water, Mill, and Seventh Sts., Milford, Pennsylvania
- Coordinates: 41°19′26″N 74°48′40″W
- Area: 6 acres (2.4 ha)
- Built: 1882, 1904, 1908
- Architect: Multiple
- NRHP reference No.: 85003163
- Added to NRHP: December 26, 1985

The Jervis Gordon Grist Mill Historic District, also known as the Milford Grist Mill and Rowe's Mill, is an historic grist mill and national historic district that are located in Milford, Pike County, Pennsylvania.

The buildings were added to the National Register of Historic Places in 1985.

== History and architectural features ==
This district includes three contributing buildings and one contributing structure. The buildings are a late-nineteenth century grist mill, blacksmith complex, and miller's house. The contributing structure consists of the mill pond, dam, head race, and tail race.

The Jervis Gordon Grist Mill consists of the original two-story structure that was built in 1882, with a shed addition that was erected in 1904, a rear enclosure covering the water wheel, and a machine shop addition that dates roughly to 1908. The mill includes original grinding machinery.

The blacksmith complex consists of three sections built roughly between 1860 and 1870. The miller's house is a wood-frame structure that dates to the late-eighteenth century, with a two-story addition built in the early- to mid-nineteenth century.

The Jervis Gordon Grist Mill, now known as the Upper Mill, has been restored and is open for self-guided tours. Admission is free.
