= Strange Seas and Shores =

1971 collection of short stories by Avram Davidson

- Cover of first edition
- Author: Avram Davidson
- Cover artist: Peter Rauch
- Language: English
- Genre: Science fiction, fantasy
- Publisher: Doubleday
- Publication date: 1971
- Publication place: United States
- Media type: Print (hardcover)
- Pages: xvi, 219 pp.
- OCLC: 00136103
- LC Class: PS3554 .A924

Strange Seas and Shores: a Collection of Short Stories is a collection of science fiction and fantasy short stories, written by Avram Davidson. It was first published in hardcover by Doubleday in 1971. A paperback edition was issued by Ace Books in August 1981, and an ebook edition by Gateway/Orion in September 2013.

== Summary ==
The book collects seventeen novelettes and short stories, originally published in various magazines, with a preface by the author and an introduction by the American author Ray Bradbury.

== Contents ==
- "Preface"
- "Introduction: Night Travel on the Orient Express Destination: Avram" (Ray Bradbury)
- "Sacheverell"
- "Take Wooden Indians"
- "The Vat"
- "The Tail-Tied Kings"
- "Paramount Ulj"
- "A Bottle Full of Kismet"
- "The Goobers"
- "Dr. Morris Goldpepper Returns"
- "The Certificate"
- "Ogre in the Vly"
- "Après Nous"
- "Climacteric"
- "Yo-Ho, and Up"
- "The Sixty-Third Street Station"
- "The House the Blakeneys Built"
- "The Power of Every Root"
- "The Sources of the Nile"

== Reception ==
The collection was reviewed by James R. Newton in Son of the WSFA Journal #32, James Blish in The Magazine of Fantasy & Science Fiction, December 1971, Charles N. Brown in Locus #102, December 10, 1971, Locus #104, January 14, 1972, and Locus #248, September 1981, Paul Walker in Luna Monthly #40, September 1972, David A. Truesdale in Science Fiction Review, Spring 1982, and Tom Easton in Analog Science Fiction/Science Fact, March 29, 1982.
