= The Adventures of Doctor Eszterhazy =

1991 collection of historical mystery fantasy short stories by Avram Davidson

- Cover of first edition
- Author: Avram Davidson
- Illustrator: Todd Cameron Hamilton
- Cover artist: George Barr
- Language: English
- Genre: Fantasy
- Publisher: Owlswick Press
- Publication date: 1991
- Publication place: United States
- Media type: Print (hardcover)
- Pages: xi, 366 pp.
- ISBN: 0-913896-28-4
- OCLC: 23904652
- LC Class: PS3554.A924 A48 1990

The Adventures of Doctor Eszterhazy is a collection of historical mystery fantasy short stories by Avram Davidson featuring his scholarly detective character Doctor Eszterhazy and set in an imaginary European country. It was first published in hardcover by Owlswick Press in January 1991, with an ebook edition issued by Gateway/Orion in August 2013. The book is an expansion of the earlier collection The Enquiries of Doctor Eszterhazy (1975), adding five more stories written later but set earlier; the only Eszterhazy story it left uncollected was 1988's "The Odd Old Bird."

== Summary ==
The book contains fourteen novellas, novelettes, and short stories, originally published in various speculative fiction magazines or the earlier Eszterhazy collection. It has an introduction by Gene Wolfe and a concluding essay by the author.

== Contents ==
- "The Fish Unturned: Avram Davidson" [introduction] (Gene Wolfe)
- "Cornet Eszterhazy" (originally titled "Young Doctor Eszterhazy," from Amazing Stories v. 58, no. 4, November 1984)
- "The Autogondola Invention" (originally titled "Eszterhazy and the Autogondola-Invention," from Amazing Science Fiction v. 57, no. 4, November 1983)
- "Duke Pasquale's Ring" (from Amazing Stories v. 59, no. 1, May 1985)
- "Writ in Water, or the Gingerbread Man" (from Amazing Stories v. 59, no. 3, September 1985)
- "The King Across the Mountains" (from Amazing Stories v. 61, no. 2, July 1986)
- "Polly Charms, the Sleeping Woman" (from The Magazine of Fantasy & Science Fiction, v. 48, no. 2, February 1975)
- "The Crown Jewels of Jerusalem, or The Tell-Tale Head" (from The Magazine of Fantasy & Science Fiction, v. 49, no. 2, August 1975)
- "The Old Woman Who Lived with a Bear" (from The Enquiries of Doctor Eszterhazy, 1975)
- "The Church of Saint Satan and Pandaemons" (from Fantastic, v. 25, no. 1, December 1975)
- "Milord Sir Smiht, the English Wizard" (from The Enquiries of Doctor Eszterhazy, 1975)
- "The Case of the Mother-in-Law of Pearl" (from Fantastic, v. 24, no. 6, October 1975)
- "The Ceaseless Stone" (from New Venture #3, Winter 1975)
- "The King's Shadow Has No Limits" (from Whispers #8, December 1975)
- "The Inchoation of Eszterhazy" [essay] (from Weird Tales v. 50, no. 4, Winter 1988/89) Davidson

== Reception ==
The collection was reviewed by Tom Whitmore in Locus #361, February 1991, Dan Chow in Locus #362, March 1991, Mary Gentle in Interzone #50 August 1991, and Tom Easton in Analog Science Fiction and Fact, Mid-December 1991.

== Awards ==
- The collection placed eighth in the 1992 Locus Poll Award for Best Collection.
- "Young Doctor Eszterhazy" was nominated for the 1985 Nebula Award for Best Novella and placed eighth in the 1985 Locus Poll Award for Best Novella.
- "Eszterhazy and the Autogondola-Invention" was nominated for the 1984 Nebula Award for Best Novella and placed thirteenth in the 1984 Locus Poll Award for Best Novella.
- "Duke Pasquale's Ring" placed fifteenth in the 1986 Locus Poll Award for Best Novella.
- "Polly Charms, the Sleeping Woman" was nominated for the 1976 Nebula Award for Best Novelette, and placed tenth in the 1976 Locus Poll Award for Best Novelette.
