= Sean Strub =

American writer, publisher, activist, politician and entrepreneur

- Born: Sean O'Brien Strub; May 16, 1958 (age 68); Iowa City, Iowa, United States
- Occupations: Writer, entrepreneur, activist and advocate, mayor
- Known for: Pioneer expert in mass-marketed fundraising for LGBT equality; Long-term AIDS survivor; ACT UP New York activist; Founded POZ and other magazines
- Website: https://seanstrub.com

Sean O'Brien Strub (born May 16, 1958) is an American writer, activist, elected official, historic preservationist and documentary filmmaker.

From 2016 to 2024, Sean Strub served as mayor of Milford, Pennsylvania, initially appointed by the borough council to complete a previous mayor's term and subsequently won election to a four-year term in 2017 and re-election in 2021. Dutch journalist Max Westerman released a documentary My Friend The Mayor about Strub's 2017 mayoral campaign. On December 18, 2024, Strub formally announced his resignation in a letter to the borough council.

While Mayor of Milford, Strub reached out to the three federally-recognized Lenne Lenape tribes indigenous to Northeast Pennsylvania, and began a seven-year reconciliation and education project that includes a permanent exhibit at the Pike County Historical Society Museum, a land giveback and documentary film Strub produced, Burying the Hatchet: The Tom Quick Story that aired on public television stations across the U.S. in 2025 and 2026.

He chaired the Milford Enhancement Committee, helped launch film, literary and opera festivals and renovated and co-owned the Hotel Fauchere, a historic European-style boutique hotel in Milford that was a member of Relais & Chateaux. He served on the board of the Greater Pike Community Foundation from 2013 to 2023.

He is a long-term HIV/AIDS survivor and has been an outspoken advocate for the self-empowerment movement for people with HIV/AIDS, in 2011 founding the Sero Project, a national network of people living with HIV combating stigma and injustice, and serving as its executive director until 2023. A film produced by Strub, HIV Is Not a Crime helped launch the global movement to end HIV criminalization.

In the early 1990s, Strub founded POZ magazine and POZ en Español, (for people impacted by HIV/AIDS), Mamm (for women impacted by breast cancer), Real Health (an African American health magazine) and, from 2000 to 2008, he published Milford Magazine (a regional title distributed in the Delaware River Highlands area of north-east Pennsylvania).

He was a long-time member of ACT UP New York and, in 1992, produced an off-Broadway play, The Night Larry Kramer Kissed Me, written by and starring David Drake. In 1990, he ran for the House of Representatives to represent New York's 22nd congressional district (which then included Rockland County and parts of Orange, Westchester and Sullivan Counties). He was the first openly HIV+ candidate for federal office in the U.S. and received 46% of the Democratic primary vote.

In 2009 he was president of Cable Positive, the cable and telecommunications' industry's AIDS response. From 2010 to 2012, he served on the board of directors of the Amsterdam-based Global Network of People Living with HIV/AIDS (GNP+) and co-chaired their North American regional affiliate. He has been a leader in combating HIV-related criminalization and in 2010 launched the Positive Justice Project with the Center for HIV Law & Policy.

His memoir, Body Counts: A Memoir of Politics, Sex, AIDS and Survival (Scribner) was published in January 2014. Strub co-authored Rating America's Corporate Conscience (Addison-Wesley, 1985), a guide to corporate social responsibility, with Steve Lydenberg and Alice Tepper Marlin and Cracking the Corporate Closet (HarperBusiness, 1995) with Daniel B. Baker and Bill Henning.

In 2014, Strub criticized National Institute of Allergy and Infectious Diseases (NIAID) director Anthony Fauci for "delaying promotion of an AIDS treatment that would have prevented tens of thousands of deaths in the first years of the epidemic." and accused him of "rewriting history."

He pioneered mass-marketed fundraising for LGBT equality. He is an inaugural member of the WikiQueer Global Advisory Board.

== Miscellaneous ==
Strub heard the shots that killed John Lennon on Dec. 8, 1980, and watched police remove the wounded Lennon from his Manhattan apartment building, the famed Dakota on W.72nd Street. He was interviewed by television news crews shortly afterward.

In 1981, Strub got playwright Tennessee Williams to sign the first fundraising letter for the Human Rights Campaign Fund, a then-newly formed political action committee which grew to become the largest organization in the U.S. advocating for LGBT equality.

In 1989, Strub asked pop artist Keith Haring to create a logo and poster to launch National Coming Out Day, now also a part of the Human Rights Campaign.

Strub was one of the AIDS activists who put a giant condom over then-US Senator Jesse Helms's suburban Washington home in 1991.
