= What Strange Stars and Skies =

1965 collection of short stories by Avram Davidson

- Cover of first edition
- Author: Avram Davidson
- Cover artist: Jack Gaughan
- Language: English
- Genre: Science fiction, fantasy
- Publisher: Ace Books
- Publication date: 1965
- Publication place: United States
- Media type: Print (paperback)
- Pages: 188 pp.
- OCLC: 02098790
- LC Class: PS3554 .A924 W42x

What Strange Stars and Skies is a collection of science fiction and fantasy short stories, written by Avram Davidson. It was first published in paperback by Ace Books in January 1965. An ebook edition was issued by Gateway/Orion in September 2012.

== Summary ==
The book collects fourteen novelettes and short stories, two of them collaborative, originally published in various magazines, with an introduction by the author.

== Contents ==
- "Introduction"
- "What Strange Stars and Skies"
- "The Bounty Hunter"
- "The Ogre"
- "Fair Trade"
- "Love Called This Thing" (with Laura Goforth)
- "Faed-Out"
- "The Lineaments of Gratified Desire"
- "The Teeth of Despair" (with Sidney Klein)
- "Jury-Rig"
- "Miss Buttermouth"
- "Where Do You Live, Queen Esther?"
- "Mr. Stilwell's Stage"
- "The Unknown Law"
- "The Singular Events Which Occurred in the Hovel on the Alley Off of Eye Street"

== Reception ==
The collection was reviewed by James Colvin in New Worlds SF, May 1966, and P. Schuyler Miller in Analog Science Fiction -> Science Fact, June 1967 .
