= Pike County Arts and Crafts =

Pike County Arts and Crafts (PCAC), headquartered in Milford, Pennsylvania, is the oldest (established 1950) and largest (200 members) arts education organization in northeastern Pennsylvania. Headquartered in the Milford Boro Hall, the group holds regularly scheduled classes as well as seminars taught by master artists, such as, Ada R. Cecere, Matilda Grech and others mentioned below. Also teaching classes are master crafters.

PCAC was chosen by the Pennsylvania Council on the Arts as winner of the 2007 Pennsylvania State "Creative Community Award".

== Membership and support ==
A nonprofit organization, PCAC is supported by member dues, donations, and grants from the Pocono Arts Council of the National Endowment for the Arts and the Pike county commissioners.

The board of directors meets on the third Thursday of each month. The executive director is Elizabeth Murphy. Associate Director is Tauni Ruvolis. Show directors are James Campistrous and Ellen Cabaniss Bawcom.

About two-thirds of PCAC's artist-members earn their livelihoods as professional artists or crafters. Non-artist members join the group as "friends of the arts," "arts associates," or "community sponsors."

== History ==
Around 1950 the Pike County Arts and Crafts Exhibition, once an adjunct of the Milford Garden Club's Flower Show, became a separate entity. The local demand created the formation of an Art Group, as warranted to exhibit paintings, sculptures and crafts, on an Annual basis.

The original committee included Carrie Depuy, Ada Rasario Cecere. Co-founder, President and board member Pen and Ink Society as well as many other Arts organizations, Gaetano Cecere, Professor, National Academician, Natl. Archives of American Art, Smithsonian Insti.

Telly Bruce (correct spelling Tilly Brice, by RC) and Georgiana "known as Georgi" Kiger through the 1950s the committee met and put on the show working through the night, for both the Crafts on Exhibition as well as hanging the paintings. Guy Cecere headed the Sculpture displays and placements. Robert, son of the mentioned below, placed many posters, signage around town to announce the Exhibition days and hours.

In the mid-1960s Harriett Cotterill and Matilda Grech joined the original committee along with Cynthia Van Lierde. It was decided to become officially chartered in 1971. From that year on, they met as a board of directors at the homes/studio on Christian Hill of Ada and Gaetano Cecere, Georgie Kiger and Tilly Brice. During the 1960s The Cecere's had assistance from Rose Cioffi and her husband Al Cioffi, son Robert Cioffi, sculptor and mentored by Gaetano known as "Guy" retired professor from Univ. of Virginia, Mary Washington College. Robert Cioffi continued sculpting in his college days and to the present, 2012.

From 1971 to 1990 it continued to meet and put on a show. In the early 1990s it lost (deceased) most of the original committee members. Georgi Kiger (the remaining original member) continued to chair the show along with Harriet and Matilda. New members were added in the 1990s: Tom and Judy Neugebauer, Ben Van Steinburgh, Valerie Meyer, Michele Jaffee, and Robert Mendoza.

Georgi Kiger died in December 1995; her son Bill Kiger donated $500.00 the following year to start the "Georgiana Kiger Award for Excellence in the Arts"; he continued to donate each succeeding year.

In the 21st century Susan Pisarri greatly expanded PCAC to include many more committees and school activities.
