= Or All the Seas with Oysters (collection) =

1962 collection of short stories by Avram Davidson

- Cover of first edition
- Author: Avram Davidson
- Cover artist: Richard M. Powers
- Language: English
- Genre: Fantasy, science fiction
- Publisher: Berkley Medallion
- Publication date: 1962
- Publication place: United States
- Media type: Print (paperback)
- Pages: 176 pp.
- OCLC: 07261881
- LC Class: PS3554.A924 O7 1962

Or All the Seas with Oysters is a collection of fantasy and science fiction short stories, written by Avram Davidson. It was first published in paperback by Berkley Medallion in 1962. The first hardcover edition was issued by White Lion in January 1976, and a second paperback edition by Pocket Books in December of the same year. An ebook edition was published by Gateway/Orion in August 2012.

== Summary ==
The book collects eighteen novelettes and short stories by the author.

== Contents ==
- "Or All the Seas with Oysters"
- "Up the Close and Doun the Stair"
- "Now Let Us Sleep"
- "The Grantha Sighting"
- "Help! I Am Dr. Morris Goldpepper"
- "The Sixth Season"
- "Negra Sum"
- "Or the Grasses Grow"
- "My Boy Friend's Name Is Jello"
- "The Golem"
- "Summerland"
- "King's Evil"
- "Great is Diana"
- "I Do Not Hear You, Sir"
- "Author, Author"
- "Dagon"
- "The Montavarde Camera"
- "The Woman Who Thought She Could Read"

== Reception ==
The collection was reviewed by P. Schuyler Miller in Analog Science Fact -> Science Fiction, February 1963, Michael Bishop in Delap's F & SF Review, March-April 1978, and Everett F. Bleiler in The Guide to Supernatural Fiction, 1983.

== Awards ==
The collection's title story won the 1958 Hugo Award for Best Short Story.
