= Louis Fauchère =

Chef and hotelier

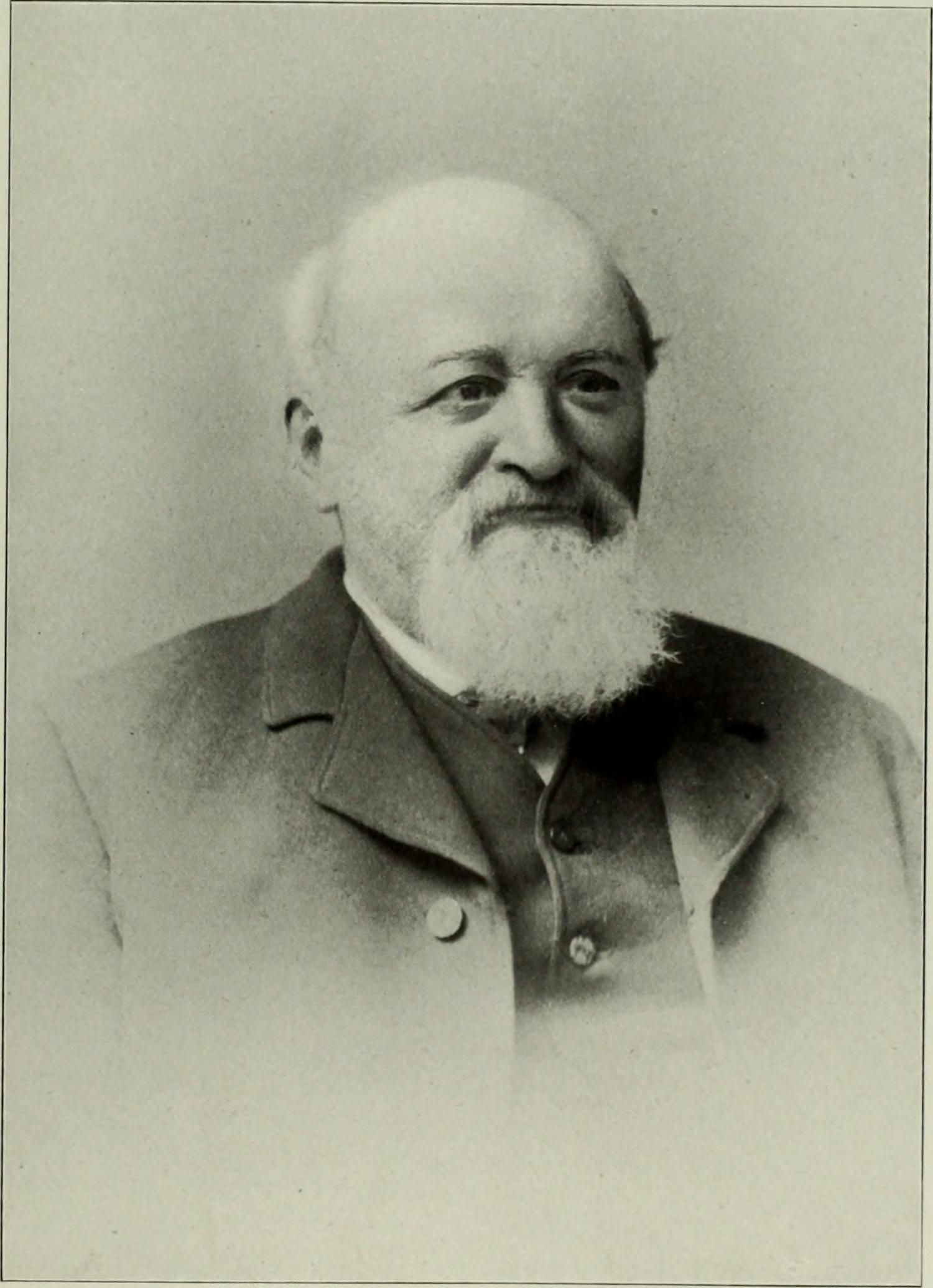
Louis Fauchère

Louis Fauchère (March 4, 1823 - September 11, 1893) was a Swiss-American chef and hotelier, sometimes credited with being the inventor of Lobster Newberg, which is unlikely, and best known for his role as chef at Delmonico's Restaurant in New York City.

Fauchère was born in Verbier, Switzerland. At age 15, he became an apprentice hotel cook, in 1846 married Rosalie Perrochet, with whom he had a daughter, Marie Fauchère, in 1848, and came to America with his family in 1851. He began working at Delmonico's Restaurant that same year. In summers, he worked in resort hotels including the Grand Union Hotel in Saratoga Springs, New York, the Delavan House in Albany, New York, and the Fort William Henry Hotel on Lake George, New York, as well as an in-law's hotel in Milford, Pennsylvania, which he purchased in 1867 and renamed the Hotel Fauchère.
