= Ursus of Ultima Thule =

1973 novel by Avram Davidson

- Cover of first edition
- Author: Avram Davidson
- Cover artist: Enric Torres-Prat
- Language: English
- Genre: Fantasy
- Publisher: Avon Books
- Publication date: 1973
- Publication place: United States
- Media type: Print (paperback)
- Pages: 236

Ursus of Ultima Thule is a fix-up fantasy novel by American writer Avram Davidson. It originally appeared as the novella "Arnten of Ultima Thule" in If v. 20, no. 12, July/August 1971, and the two-part serial "The Forges of Nainland are Cold" in Fantastic, v. 21, no. 6-v. 22, no. 1, August–October 1972. The complete novel, which incorporated a new chapter as a bridge between the two component stories, was first published in paperback by Avon Books in December 1973. It was reissued in hardcover and trade paperback by Wildside Press in March 2000, with an audiobook edition following from the save publisher in November 2011. Ebook editions were issued by Prologue Books in August 2012 and SF Gateway in May 2013.

== Plot summary ==
The novel is set in the distant past, in the then fairly temperate country of Ultima Thule, now buried beneath Arctic ice. This primitive realm is made of up various bands, but has a king, Orfas. Young protagonist Arnten is shunned by his peers in his band due to his inquiring mind and his status as son of the exiled were-bear Arntat. Nonetheless, he is allowed to join in a hunt for wild horses by the more tolerant Tall Roke, the band's best hunter. The expedition comes to grief when the hunters encounter a mammoth, resulting in most of the party killed and Arnten scapegoated for the disaster. On the advice of his shaman uncle, he flees to seek out his father.

The kingdom is failing. It is dependent for weapons and other necessities on iron mined and forged by the local dwarfs or Nains, but the metal has become "sick" and prone to decay. King Orfas, whose own health is somehow linked to that of the iron, is also ill, and becoming increasingly tyrannical as a result. No one knows how to deal with the situation.

Arnten finds his father, whom he learns is the king's half-brother. He was exiled because Orfas had come to view him as a threat; he has managed to stay free by remaining in bear form. Arnten realizes he himself has inherited his father's bear nature. As father and son travel together in human form, they are discovered and caught by Orfas's men, and condemned to the mines of the Nains.

With the aid of Arntat and the Nains, Arnten escapes the mines and returns to his native village. There he joins with the now recovered Tall Roke, his uncle, and others to travel to the land of the wizards, who can break the spell afflicting the iron. The quest succeeds, and Arnten claims his true heritage.

== Reception ==
Editor and critic Rich Horton calls the book "an enjoyable novel," and "liked" it, praising some "neat scenes," including an interlude with a "perry" (peri), "the scene with the wizards, [and] the stories of Arntat's adventures with Orfas." But he feels the plot is "pretty straightforward, and doesn't really surprise much," and the writing, while possessing "the slant rhythms and odd turns of phrase and delight in unveiling of esoteric knowledge that we expect, ... doesn't quite sing here like the best Davidson prose." All in all, he assesses it as "a fairly minor part of the Avram Davidson canon."

The book was also reviewed by Richard A. Lupoff in Algol no. 22, May 1974.
