= Vergil in Averno =

1987 novel by Avram Davidson

- Cover of first edition
- Author: Avram Davidson
- Cover artist: Candy Jernigan
- Language: English
- Series: Vergil Magus
- Genre: Fantasy
- Publisher: Doubleday
- Publication date: 1987
- Publication place: United States
- Media type: Print (hardcover)
- Pages: 184
- ISBN: 0-385-19707-1
- OCLC: 13822556
- Followed by: The Scarlet Fig

Vergil in Averno is a fantasy novel by American writer Avram Davidson, the second volume in his Vergil Magus series. It was first published in hardcover by Doubleday in January 1987. The first ebook edition was issued by Prologue Books in August 2012. The first British edition was published as an ebook by Gollancz in September 2013. An audio edition was issued by Or All the Seas with Oysters Publishing in April 2022.

== Plot ==
Series protagonist Vergil Magus is based on the ancient Augustan era Roman epic poet Virgil, in his legendary medieval guise as a great magician living in a magical alternative version of the early Roman Empire. "[I]t is a strange sort of Empire, the Empire of the medieval imagination. Anachronisms abound--seven kings elect the Emperor, Avignon is the co-capital--but they are anachronisms consistent with medieval thinking."

The young Vergil, "not yet a full-fledged magus," is summoned to Averno, "not yet a lake, but a city built on unstable volcanic fields, with escaping natural gases which are used for industrial processes: metalworking, tanning, textile making." It is, indeed, the wealthiest and most polluted city in Italy, and local magnates are concerned that the volcanic fires fueling their industries are dissipating or shifting. Vergil's charge is to use his skills and magic to investigate the problem and, if possible, solve it. But Vergil finds his mission more than he bargained for involving "counterfeiters and alchemists, rituals of superstition and sorcery, mystic visions and magic lantern shows." He is also sidetracked by the allure of a beautiful woman, the wife of a powerful and jealous man. In "a tale of sin and retribution, corruption and money, magic and science, ... [e]ventually Averno becomes, with a vengeance, the entry to the underworld."

== Relation to other works ==
While published second, the novel is chronologically the first volume in the Vergil Magus series, preceding The Scarlet Fig (2005) and The Phoenix and the Mirror (1969).

== Reception ==
Publishers Weekly assesses the novel as "less akin to fantasy than to the fiction of Laurence Sterne or William Gaddis ... [a]n acquired taste, ... by turns witty and obscure, frustrating and fascinating." It notes that "[t]he bare skeleton of [its] plot is fleshed out with an eccentric, wide-ranging series of digressions, reminiscences, dreams and cabalistic glosses, all in a rich, baroque, rhetorical style."

Evelyn Edson, writing in Vergilius, organ of the Vergilian Society, observes that "Davidson is a science fiction writer," and rhetorically asked "What is he doing in the classical past? It is plainly the time warp that appeals to him, but he does know his classics, and Vergilians will enjoy his rich weaving of literary references, half-quotations, geographical fact, mythology and history." Noting that in The Phoenix and the Mirror he had "projected an entire series of books, to be entitled Vergil Magus, the reviewer enthusiastically opines "May he fulfill this promise!"

The book was also reviewed by Faren Miller in Locus #313, February 1987, Algis Budrys in The Magazine of Fantasy & Science Fiction, April 1987, Adrian De Wit in Fantasy Review, April 1987, Don D'Ammassa in Science Fiction Chronicle #92, May 1987, Pascal J. Thomas in A&A #108/109, July–August 1987 and in Thrust #28, Fall 1987, and Tom Easton in Analog Science Fiction/Science Fact, August 1987.

== Awards ==
Vergil in Averno was nominated for the 1988 Nebula Award for Best Novel.
