= The Scarlet Fig =

2005 fantasy novel by Avram Davidson

- Cover of first edition
- Author: Avram Davidson
- Language: English
- Series: Vergil Magus
- Genre: Fantasy
- Publisher: Rose Press
- Publication date: 2005
- Publication place: United States
- Media type: Print (hardcover)
- Pages: 285
- ISBN: 978-0-9548277-1-7
- OCLC: 64593363
- Preceded by: Vergil in Averno
- Followed by: The Phoenix and the Mirror

The Scarlet Fig: or, Slowly through a Land of Stone, is a fantasy novel written by American writer Avram Davidson and, edited by Grania Davis and Henry Wessells, the third volume in his Vergil Magus series. It was first published in hardcover by Rose Press in 2005. An ebook edition was issued by Prologue Press in August 2012, and an audio version narrated by Robert Blumenfeld by Audible Studio in 2013.

== Plot ==
Series protagonist Vergil Magus is based on the ancient Augustan era Roman epic poet Virgil, in his legendary medieval guise as a great magician living in a magical alternative version of the early Roman Empire, where harpies, basilisks, and satyrs co-exist with Rome, Carthage, and the Punic Wars.

The story begins in "Yellow Rome," when Vergil accidentally touches a Vestal Virgin while trying to prevent her fall from a tipping carriage. This being a crime in Rome, the mage flees, dogged by pursuers intent on his capture. His course takes him through the port of Naples, the island of Corsica, and to sea. He is menaced on several occasions by the piratical Hemdibal, who calls himself Josaias, King of Carthage (once destroyed, but replaced by a new Carthage in the west). The mage's journey takes him to the Region of Huldah, where he meets and loves its eponymous ruler. An apparently significant incident with an elephant is alluded to, but left largely unrecounted. Afterwards Vergil visits the Island of the Lotus-eaters (where he drinks the nectar of the scarlet fig), the Island of Mazequa, Tingitayne (Morocco), and the Terrapetra (Land of Stone) in North Africa, many of which elicit commentary from the protagonist, interspersed with his own memories from his own childhood. He encounters wonders throughout, including satyrs, victims of the cockatrix, and the war-dogs of the Guaramanties (Canary Islands).

Between the penultimate and last chapter is a gap of uncertain duration, after which we find Vergil in Alexandria. There he learns some catastrophe has befallen the land and person of Huldah, sending him on a new quest to seek word of them. With this the story ends.

The narrative is followed by an afterword by Grania Davis, in which she notes that "Vergil’s journey can almost be traced on a modern map: from Yellow Rome to Naples; then by sea to Corsica of the bittersweet honey, thence to the misty and magical Region of Huldah, and the mysterious Isle of the Lotophages. Again by sea to Tingitayne in Mauritania, on the West African coast; then across the land of stone in the deserts of North Africa through Volubilis in Morocco, and finally to Alexandria in Egypt." Next comes a "note on the text" by Henry Wessels, and appendices of deleted scenes ("Quint's Eye Ointments," "The Nine Roses of Rome," "In the Region Called Azania," and "The Great Globe") and facsimile reproductions of notecards from the author's "Encyclopaedia of the World of Vergil Magus," compiled during his three decades of work on the Vergil cycle.

== Relation to other works ==
While published third, the novel is chronologically the second volume in the Vergil Magus series, following Vergil in Averno (1987) and preceding The Phoenix and the Mirror (1969).
