= Forester's Hall =

- U.S. National Register of Historic Places
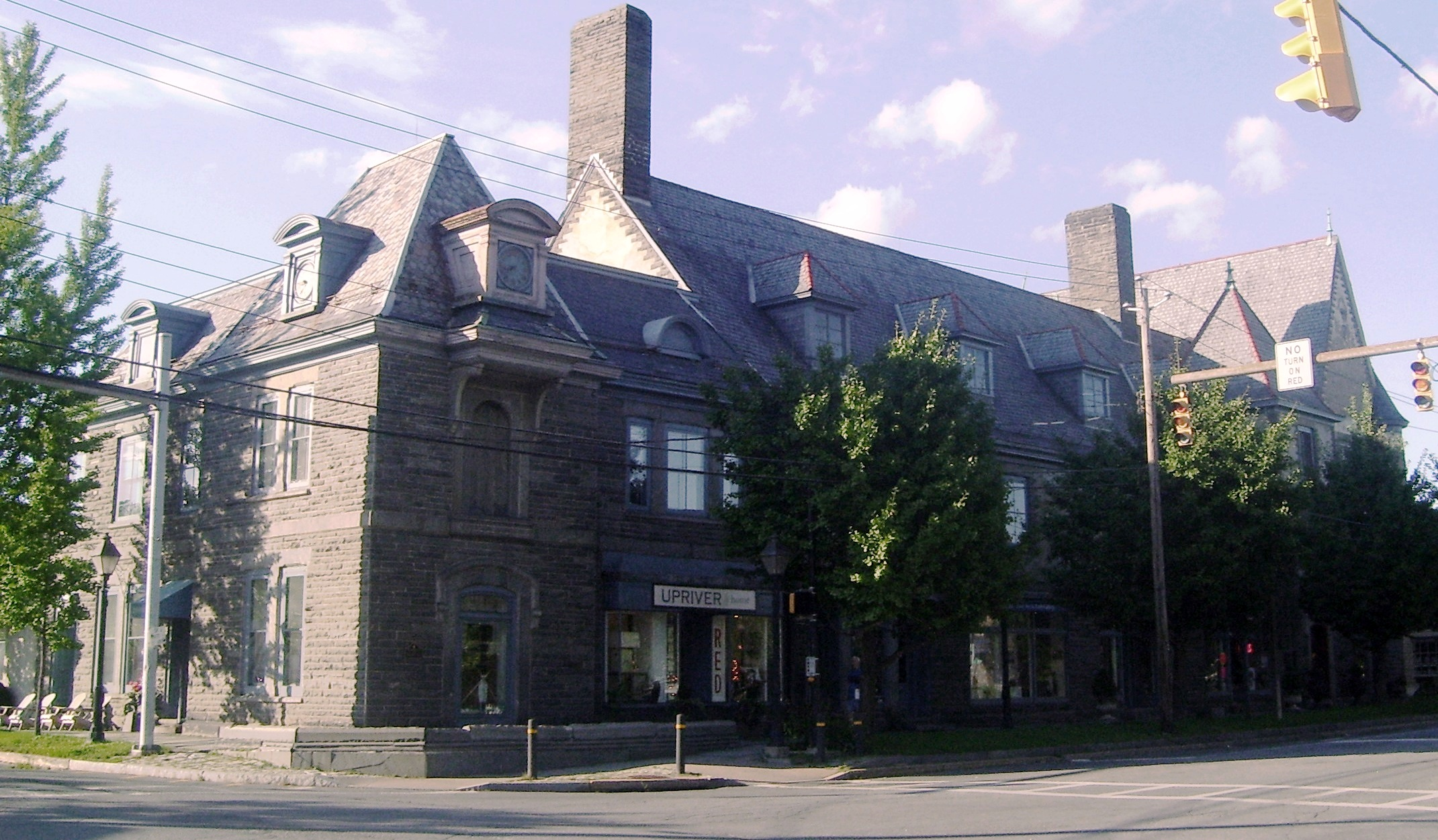
- Forest Hall, August 2011

- Location within Pennsylvania Location within the United States
- Location: Broad and Hartford Sts., Milford, Pennsylvania
- Coordinates: 41°19′21″N 74°48′14″W
- Area: 0.7 acres (0.28 ha)
- Built: 1904
- Architect: E.S. Wolfe; Hunt & Hunt
- Architectural style: Renaissance, Chateauesque
- NRHP reference No.: 83002282
- Added to NRHP: July 14, 1983

Forester's Hall, also known as Forest Hall, is a historic commercial building located at Milford, Pike County, Pennsylvania. The original section was built in 1886, and expanded in 1904. It is a large three-story, eight-bay wide building constructed of bluestone. It features a steep pointed roof, small towers, gables, dormers, and three bluestone chimneys in a Châteauesque style.

The 1904 addition was built to house classrooms and auditoriums for the summer forestry Masters program operated by the Yale School of Forestry at nearby Grey Towers.

It was added to the National Register of Historic Places in 1983. It is located within the Milford Historic District.
