= POZ (magazine) =

American HIV/AIDS magazine

- POZ #185, January/February 2013 cover featuring AIDS educators Nathaniel and Linda Scruggs
- Editor-in-chief: Oriol R. Gutierrez Jr.
- Former editors: Sean O'Brien Strub (Founder and Advisory Editor), Regan Hofmann
- Categories: News magazine
- Frequency: 8x a year
- Circulation: 125,000
- Publisher: Diane Anderson (Vice President, Integrated Sales)
- Founded: 1994
- Company: Smart + Strong
- Country: United States
- Based in: New York City, New York
- Language: English
- Website: poz.com
- ISSN: 1075-5705

POZ is a magazine that chronicles the lives of people affected by HIV/AIDS. Its website, POZ.com, has daily HIV/AIDS news, treatment information, forums, blogs, and personals.

== History and profile ==
The magazine was founded in 1994 by Sean Strub, an HIV-positive and openly gay businessman and activist. Before launching POZ, Strub was involved with numerous social issues, including politics, environmentalism, civil rights, LGBT rights, and HIV/AIDS. He is now executive director of the Sero Project, which focuses on ending inappropriate criminal prosecutions of people with HIV.

POZ is published by Smart + Strong, which also publishes AIDSmeds.com, a website for HIV/AIDS treatment information; Real Health, a magazine and website for African-American health; Tu Salud, a magazine and website for Latino health; Sane, a website for mental wellness; Hep, a website for hepatitis information, and Cancer Health, a website for cancer information.

In 2004, Strub sold Smart + Strong to CDM Publishing, LLC. Jeremy Grayzel is CEO of CDM Publishing and Smart + Strong. He was president of VNU eMedia (now known as Nielsen Business Media). Ian Anderson is president of Smart + Strong. He was director of product development at VNU eMedia. Diane Anderson is vice president of integrated sales. She joined POZ in 2018.

In 2006, Regan Hofmann became editor-in-chief of POZ. She was the writer of the magazine's “Anonymous” column. Previously, Hofmann was editor-in-chief of New Jersey Life and founded Poets, Artists & Madmen. She is now a consultant focused on strategy, communications and change in the field of global health.

In 2012, Oriol R. Gutierrez Jr. became editor-in-chief of POZ. He was deputy editor since 2008. Previously, Gutierrez was managing editor of DiversityInc, as well as cofounder, publisher and editor-in-chief of LGNY Latino.
