= The Phoenix and the Mirror =

1969 novel by Avram Davidson

- Cover of first edition
- Author: Avram Davidson
- Cover artist: James Cooper
- Language: English
- Series: Vergil Magus
- Genre: Fantasy
- Publisher: Doubleday
- Publication date: 1969
- Publication place: United States
- Media type: Print (hardcover)
- Pages: 209 pp
- OCLC: 00218453
- LC Class: PS3554.A924 P45 1969
- Preceded by: The Scarlet Fig

The Phoenix and the Mirror; or, The Enigmatic Speculum is a fantasy novel by American writer Avram Davidson, the first volume in his Vergil Magus series. It was first published in hardcover by Doubleday in February 1969, with the first paperback edition issued by Ace Books in the same year. The Ace edition was reprinted in January 1978 and February 1983. The first ebook edition was issued by Prologue Books in August 2012. The first British edition was published in paperback by Mayflower in April 1975. Gollancz issued British trade paperback and ebook editions in October 2013 and December 2013, respectively. The Gollancz edition adds an introduction by Adam Roberts.

== Plot ==
As set out in an introductory "Author's Note," the novel's protagonist Vergil Magus is based on the ancient Augustan era Roman epic poet Virgil, in his legendary medieval guise as a great magician.

The book is set in an alternate ancient Mediterranean world and features and concerns Vergil's quest to forge a "virgin speculum" (mirror) for the purpose of divination. The construction of such a mirror requires the use of unsmelted copper ore and tin, precipitating a quest to Cyprus, the source of copper in the ancient world. The story also includes a brazen head, which lends its name to Vergil's house.

== Relation to other works ==
While published first, the novel is chronologically the final volume in the series, following Vergil in Averno (1987) and The Scarlet Fig (2005).

== Reception ==
The book was reviewed by Joanna Russ in The Magazine of Fantasy & Science Fiction, August 1969, James Blish in The Magazine of Fantasy & Science Fiction, August 1970, Cindy Woodruff in Luna Monthly #32, January 1972, Fritz Leiber in Fantastic, July 1973, Paul Walker in Galaxy, June 1978, Helmut W. Pesch in Magira #32, 1979, and David Pringle (1988) in Modern Fantasy: The Hundred Best Novels, 1988.
