= Milford, Pennsylvania =

Borough in Pennsylvania, US

Milford
- Borough
- Borough of Milford
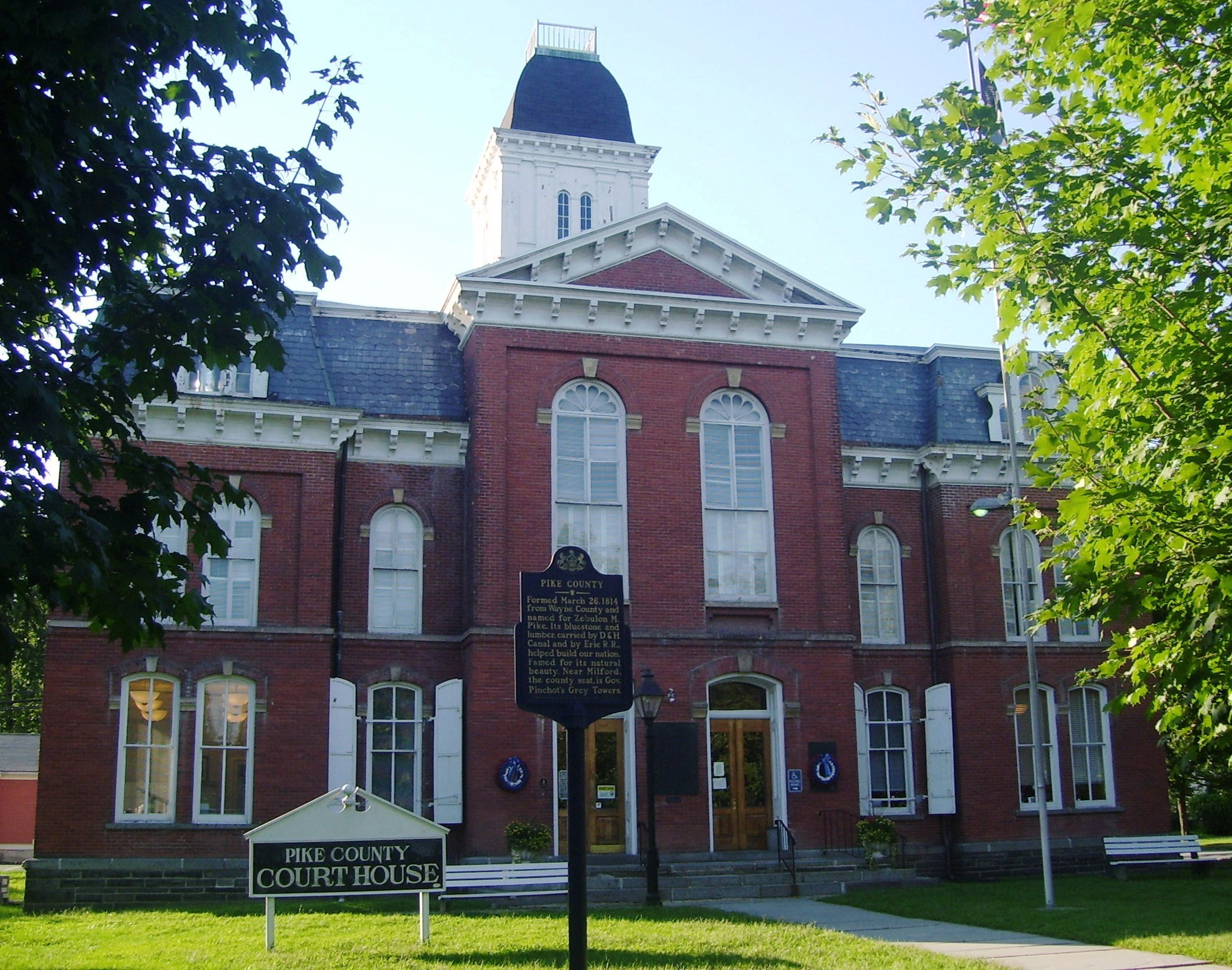
- Pike County Courthouse, built in 1874

- Seal

- Location in Pike County and the U.S. state of Pennsylvania.

- Location of Milford in Pennsylvania Milford (the United States)
- Coordinates: 41°19′N 74°48′W
- Country: United States
- State: Pennsylvania
- County: Pike
- Founded: 1796; 230 years ago
- Incorporated: 1874; 152 years ago
- Founder: John Biddis

Government
  - Mayor: Doug Jacobs (D)

Area
  - Total: 0.49 sq mi (1.27 km^{2})
  - Land: 0.47 sq mi (1.21 km^{2})
  - Water: 0.023 sq mi (0.06 km^{2})
- Elevation: 499 ft (152 m)

Population (2020)
  - Total: 1,103
  - Density: 2,351.4/sq mi (907.89/km^{2})
- Time zone: UTC-5 (EST)
  - Summer (DST): UTC-4 (EDT)
- ZIP Code: 18337
- Area codes: 570 and 272
- FIPS code: 42-49400
- Website: milfordboro.org

- Milford Historic District
- U.S. National Register of Historic Places
- U.S. Historic district
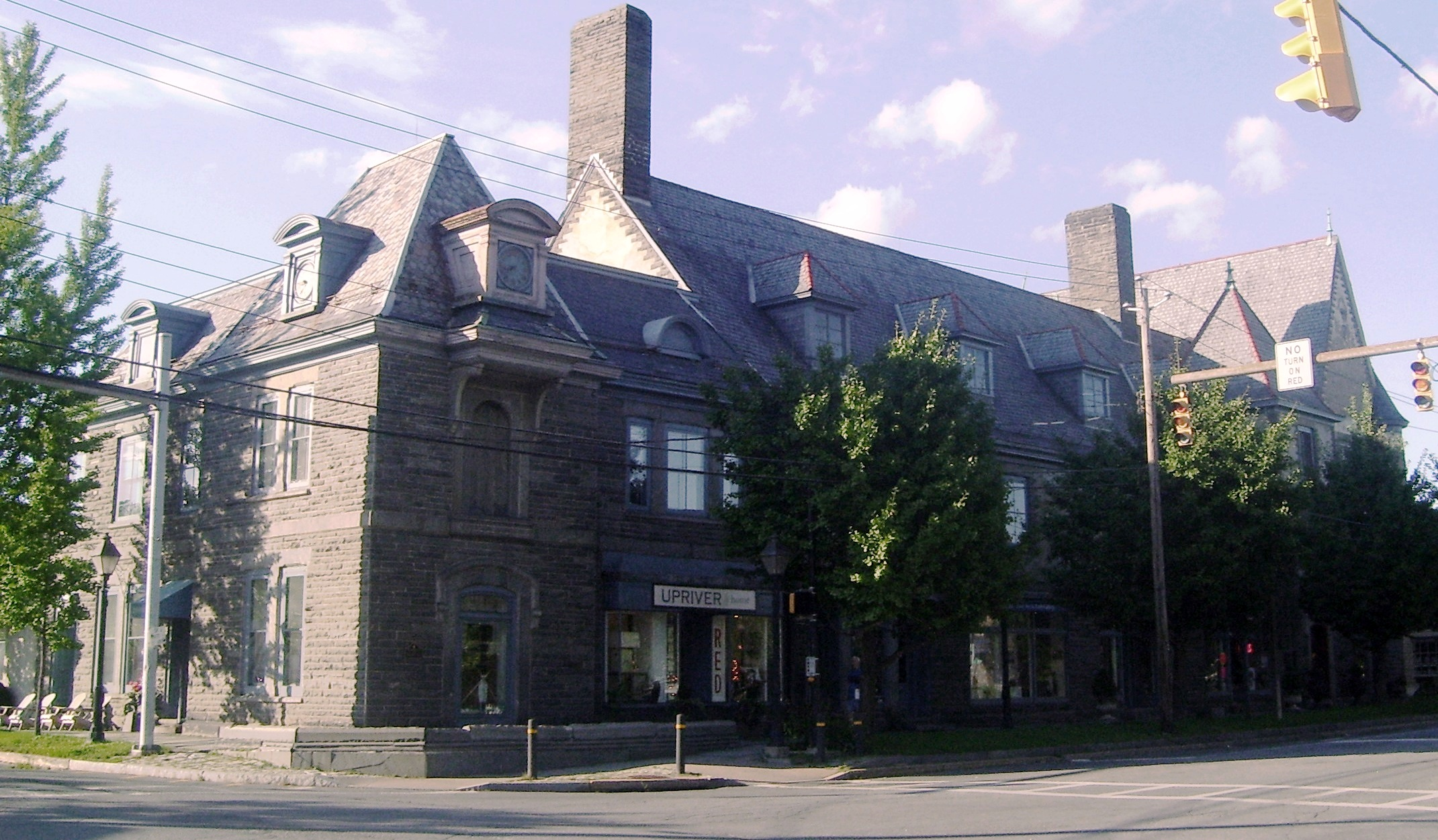
- Forester's Hall, designed by Calvert Vaux and Richard Morris Hunt

- Location within Pennsylvania Location within the United States
- Location: Roughly along Broad, Harford, Ann, Catharine, High, and Fourth Sts., Milford, Pennsylvania
- Area: 22 acres (8.9 ha)
- Architect: George Barton et al.
- Architectural style: Late Victorian, Late 19th and 20th Century Revivals, Mid-19th Century Revival
- NRHP reference No.: 98000898
- Added to NRHP: July 23, 1998

Milford is a borough that is located in Pike County, Pennsylvania, United States, and the county seat. Its population was 1,103 at the time of the 2020 census.

Situated near the upper Delaware River, Milford is part of the New York metropolitan area.

== History ==
The area along the Delaware River where the community of Milford is located had long been settled by the Lenape, an Algonquian-speaking indigenous tribe that lived in the mid-Atlantic coastal areas at the time of European colonization. The English also called them the Delaware, after the river they named for colonial leader Thomas West, 3rd Baron De La Warr, the Delaware.

Milford was founded in 1796 by Judge John Biddis, one of Pennsylvania's first four circuit judges. He named the settlement after his ancestral home in Wales.

Milford has a large number of buildings of historical significance, many constructed in the nineteenth century and early twentieth centuries. Some are listed on the National Register of Historic Places, while numerous others are included in the Milford Historic District. Of the 655 buildings in the district, 400 of them have been deemed to be historically significant. The district is characterized by a variety of Late Victorian architecture.

The Grey Towers National Historic Site, the ancestral home of Gifford Pinchot, noted conservationist, two-time governor of Pennsylvania, and first head of the U.S. Forest Service, is located in Milford. It was designed by architect Richard Morris Hunt has been designated a National Historic Site.

From 1904 to 1926, Grey Towers was the site of summer field study sessions for the Master's degree program of the Yale School of Forestry, together with the Forester's Hall, a commercial building that was adapted and expanded for this purpose.Jervis Gordon Grist Mill Historic District, Hotel Fauchere and Annex, Metz Ice Plant, and Pike County Courthouse are also listed on the National Register of Historic Places. Nearby is Arisbe, the home of Charles S. Peirce, a prominent logician, philosopher and scientist in the late 19th century, and another NRHP property. The Milford Historic District was listed in 1998.

The Milford Writer's Workshop, an annual science fiction writers' event, was founded in 1956, and ran until it moved to the United Kingdom in 1972, where it is still running.

The Pike County Historical Society Museum in Milford includes in its collection the "Lincoln Flag," which was draped on President Abraham Lincoln's booth at Ford's Theatre on the night he was assassinated. The flag was bundled up and placed under the president's head, and still bears his blood. It was kept by stage manager Thomas Gourlay, who passed it down to his daughter, Jeannie, an actress who had appeared in the play, Our American Cousin, at the theatre that night and who later moved to Milford. The flag was donated to the museum after her death.

In September 2007, Arthur Frommer's Budget Travel named Milford second on its list of "Ten Coolest Small Towns" in Pennsylvania.

== Geography ==
According to the U.S. Census Bureau, the borough has a total area of 0.5 square miles (1.3 km^{2}), all land.

Milford is located on the Upper Delaware River, which divides Pennsylvania's Poconos region from the Catskill Mountains in New York, in what was historically a heavily-forested area. When Judge Biddis bought up the land of what was then known as Wells Ferry and laid out the lots for the new town, he generally followed the urban plan of Philadelphia. He created the grid that made High Street the equivalent of what is now Market Street in Philadelphia, running it to the Delaware River while also making Broad Street perpendicular to High. At the intersection of Broad and High is a public square, just as there is at Broad and Market in Philadelphia. Most of Milford's official buildings are located there.

Within that grid, Milford's east–west streets were numbered as Second through Seventh streets with Broad falling between Fourth and Fifth. North–south streets were named after Biddis' children: Ann, Catherine, George, John, Sarah, and Elizabeth. In between both the named and numbered streets are alleys, that were named after berries and fruit.

In contemporary Milford, Broad Street is also marked as U.S. Route 6 and U.S. Route 209. At its intersection with Harford Street, Route 6 continues north on Harford, while Route 209 continues south on the street.

Milford is located on an escarpment above the Delaware River. All waterways there which drain into the river fall the 100-foot (30 m) difference in height, creating what is known as a "fluviarchy," a network of waterfalls that is putatively the most notable east of the Rocky Mountains. These also provided waterpower to mills that contributed to Milford's growing economy during the nineteenth century.

Historical population
Census	Pop.	Note	%±
1870	746		—
1880	983		31.8%
1890	793		−19.3%
1900	884		11.5%
1910	872		−1.4%
1920	768		−11.9%
1930	886		15.4%
1940	901		1.7%
1950	1,111		23.3%
1960	1,198		7.8%
1970	1,190		−0.7%
1980	1,143		−3.9%
1990	1,064		−6.9%
2000	1,104		3.8%
2010	1,021		−7.5%
2020	1,103		8.0%

== Demographics ==
As of the census of 2010, there were 1,021 people, 491 households, and 236 families residing in the borough. The population density was 2,042 inhabitants per square mile (788/km^{2}). There were 580 housing units at an average density of 1,160 per square mile (450/km^{2}). The racial makeup of the borough was 95.2% White, 0.6% African American, 0.5% Native American, 0.5% Asian, 1.4% from other races, and 1.9% from two or more races. Hispanic or Latino of any race were 5.5% of the population. Pike County has one of the highest concentration of same-sex households of any county in Pennsylvania.

There were 491 households, out of which 19.6% had children under the age of 18 living with them, 35.4% were married couples living together, 10.2% had a female householder with no husband present, and 51.9% were non-families. 42.4% of all households were made up of individuals, and 21.4% had someone living alone who was 65 years of age or older. The average household size was 2.01 and the average family size was 2.79.

In the borough the population was spread out, with 16.3% under the age of 18, 59.9% from 18 to 64, and 23.8% who were 65 years of age or older. The median age was 48.3 years.

The median income for a household in the borough was $33,571, and the median income for a family was $46,136. Males had a median income of $40,500 versus $28,333 for females. The per capita income for the borough was $21,011. About 4.0% of families and 9.1% of the population were below the poverty line, including 8.1% of those under age 18 and 5.6% of those age 65 or over.

== Education ==
Milford is served by the Delaware Valley School District. Including an Elementary school in Matamoras, serving children from Matamoras, and Milford. Delaware Valley middle school serves children from Milford, Matamoras and Shohola areas. Delaware Valley High School serves children from Milford, Matamoras, Shohola, and Dingman areas.

== Cultural activities ==
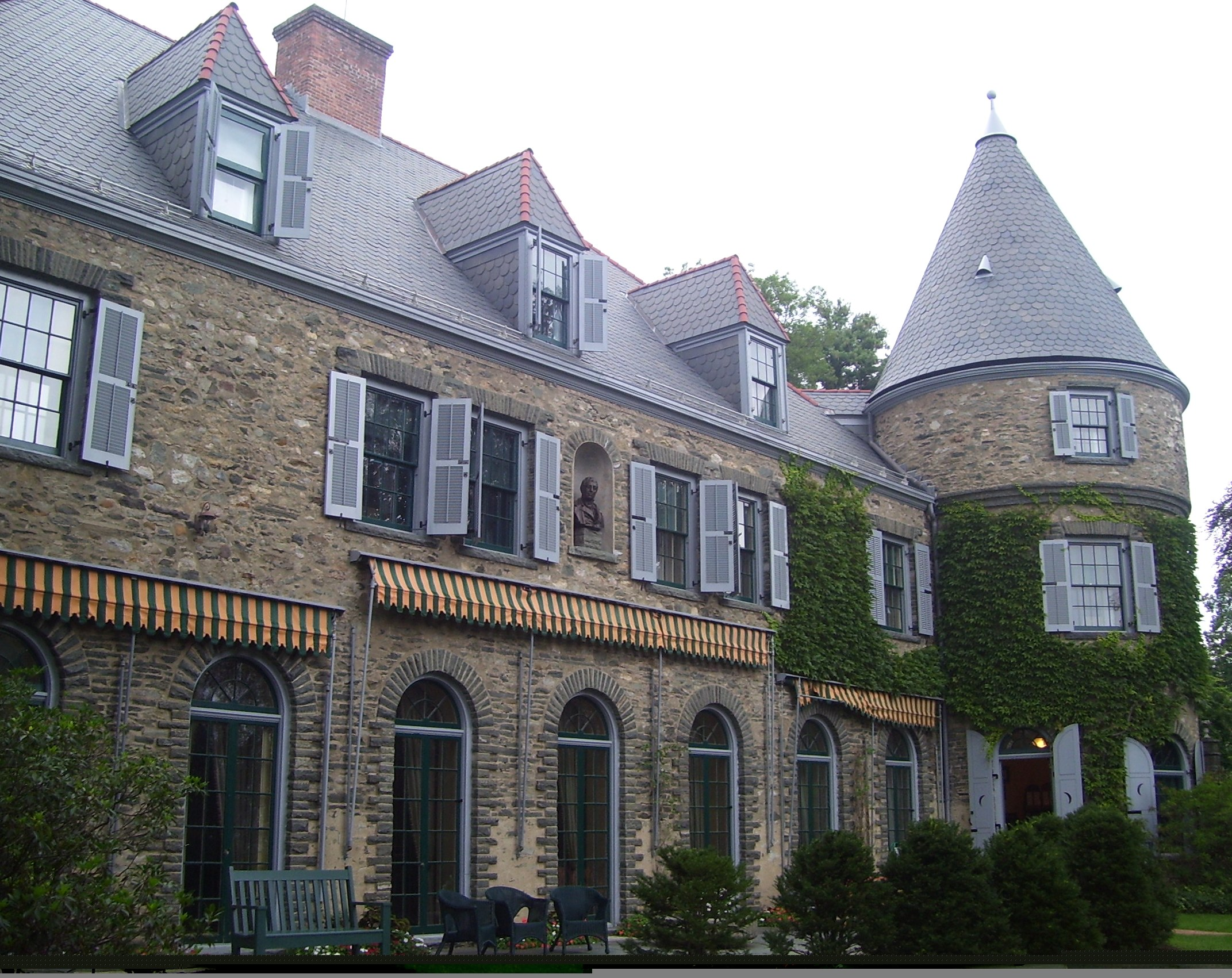
"Grey Towers," home of Gifford Pinchot

Milford is home to Pike County Arts and Crafts, an art education organization that was chosen by the Pennsylvania Council on the Arts as winner of the 2007 Pennsylvania State "Creative Community Award.". Since 1950, Pike County Arts and Crafts has also hosted an annual art show each July in Borough Hall.

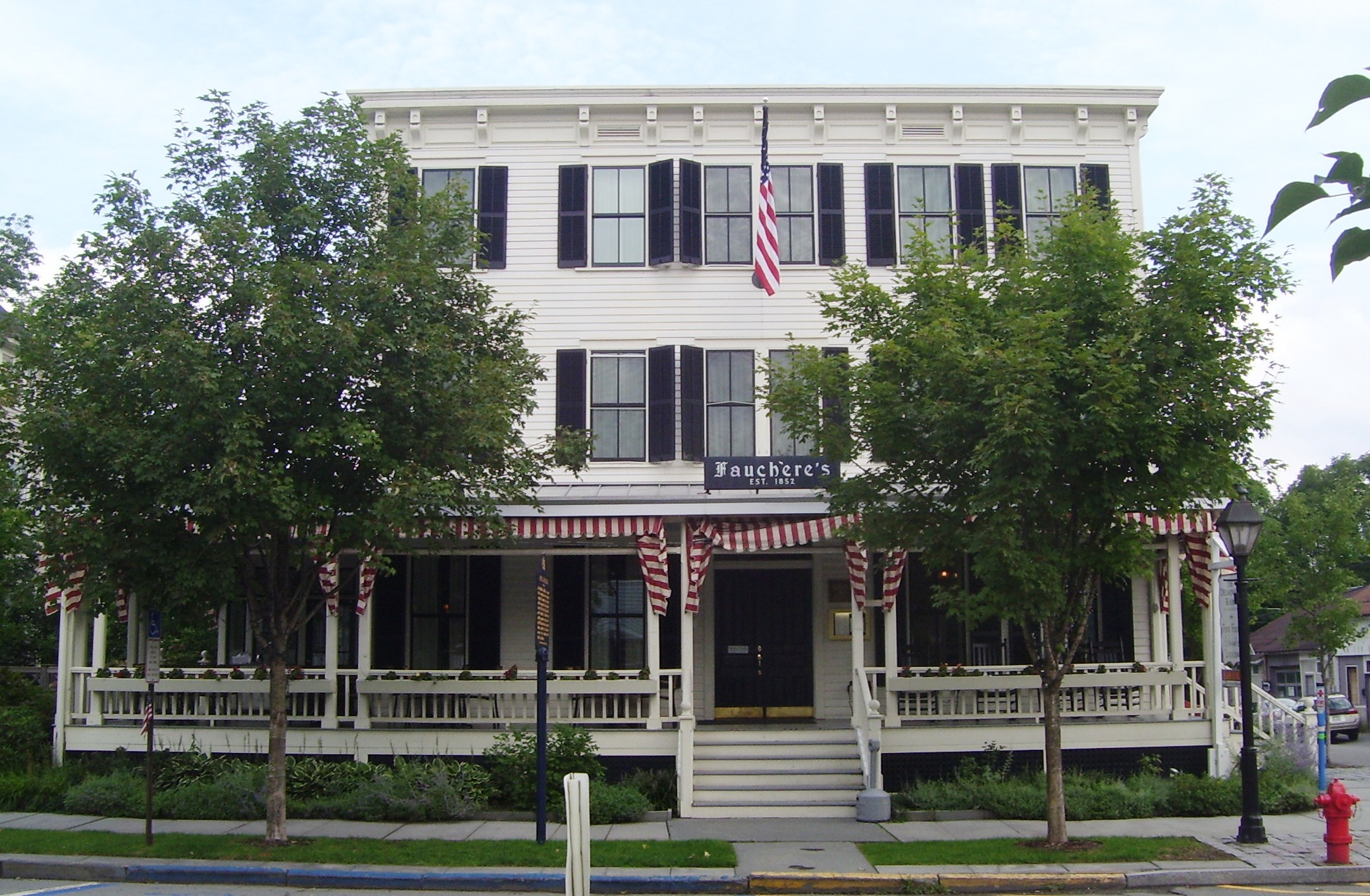
The Hotel Fauchère, established in 1852, has hosted multiple prominent guests, including U.S. presidents and poets

Milford's Hotel Fauchère has hosted multiple prominent guests since 1852, including U.S. presidents Theodore and Franklin Delano Roosevelt and John F. Kennedy, philanthropist Andrew Carnegie, poets Robert Frost and Ogden Nash, baseball's Babe Ruth, and actors Sarah Bernhardt, Charlie Chaplin, Mary Pickford, Rudolph Valentino, and Mae West. Listed on the National Register of Historic Places since 1980, this hotel was restored in 2006. It has sixteen guest rooms, three restaurants and a corporate meeting facility.

The Pike County Chess Club was founded in 2011. Games played at these tournaments are submitted for rating by the United States Chess Federation (USCF), with which the club is affiliated.

== Annual events ==
The Black Bear Film Festival is an annual independent film festival, which has taken place the weekend after Columbus Day in October every year since 2000. Held primarily at the historic Milford Theater, the festival also includes many free films and lectures in a Film Salon, as well as feature films for an admission fee. In recent years, stars participating in the film festival have included Farley Granger, Tab Hunter, Marge Champion, Lorna Luft, Arlene Dahl, Larry Kramer and others.

The Milford Music Festival takes place each June. It is a free, weekend event sponsored by Milfordmusicfest.org, which also produces Septemberfest, Share The Harvest and the annual Tree Lighting. The 2009 Milford Music Festival was headlined by Vanessa Carlton, the Grammy-nominated singer-songwriter/pianist who is from Milford. In 2013, the festival featured Pete Seeger.

The Milford Readers and Writers Festival, inaugurated in 2015, is held in September each year and focuses on facilitating conversation between readers and writers. Recent featured guests have included Lee Child, John Berendt, Robin Morgan, Gloria Steinem, Tim Murphy, Tim Teeman, M.K. Asante, Alan Alda, Billy Goldstein, Brooke Warner, Suzanne Braun Levine, Anne-Christine d'Adesky, Sean Strub, Mary Badham, Robert Moor, Susan Faludi, Julie Barton, Carol Jenkins, Lucian Truscott IV, Frances FitzGerald, Judge Andrew Napolitano, Phil Klay, John Leland, Ducan Hannah, Bob Eckstein, and others.

Other events include the Festival of Wood, DanceFest Milford, Pike Opera, and "Artwalks" scheduled throughout the year.

== Notable people ==
- John A. Gotti, former acting boss of the Gambino crime family, held secondary residence
- Louis Allen, a New York Army National Guard officer killed in a fragging incident in 2005 during the Iraq War
- James Blish, Damon Knight, Judith Merril and Kate Wilhelm (Mrs. Knight), all science fiction writers
- Vanessa Carlton, singer/pianist
- Bob Guccione, Jr, magazine publisher
- Allyn Joslyn, stage and screen actor
- Christopher Makos, artist, photographer
- Frank McCourt, author
- Martin & Muñoz, visual artists also known as Walter Martin & Paloma Muñoz
- Mary Pickford, silent film actress
- Gifford Pinchot's family, including Cornelia Bryce Pinchot and Mary Pinchot Meyer
- Al Pitrelli, guitarist
- Tom Quick, first born child of European ancestry in the region, purported to have murdered numerous Lenape, an indigenous people of the area
- Charles Sanders Peirce, a philosopher and polymath, lived on a farm 3 miles from Milford, from 1887 until his 1914 death
- Bill Steele, Major League Baseball pitcher for the St. Louis Cardinals, born and raised in Milford
- Sean Strub, writer, activist, founder of POZ magazine*, and former mayor of Milford
- Mary Wiseman, actress (Star Trek: Discovery)

== Gallery ==
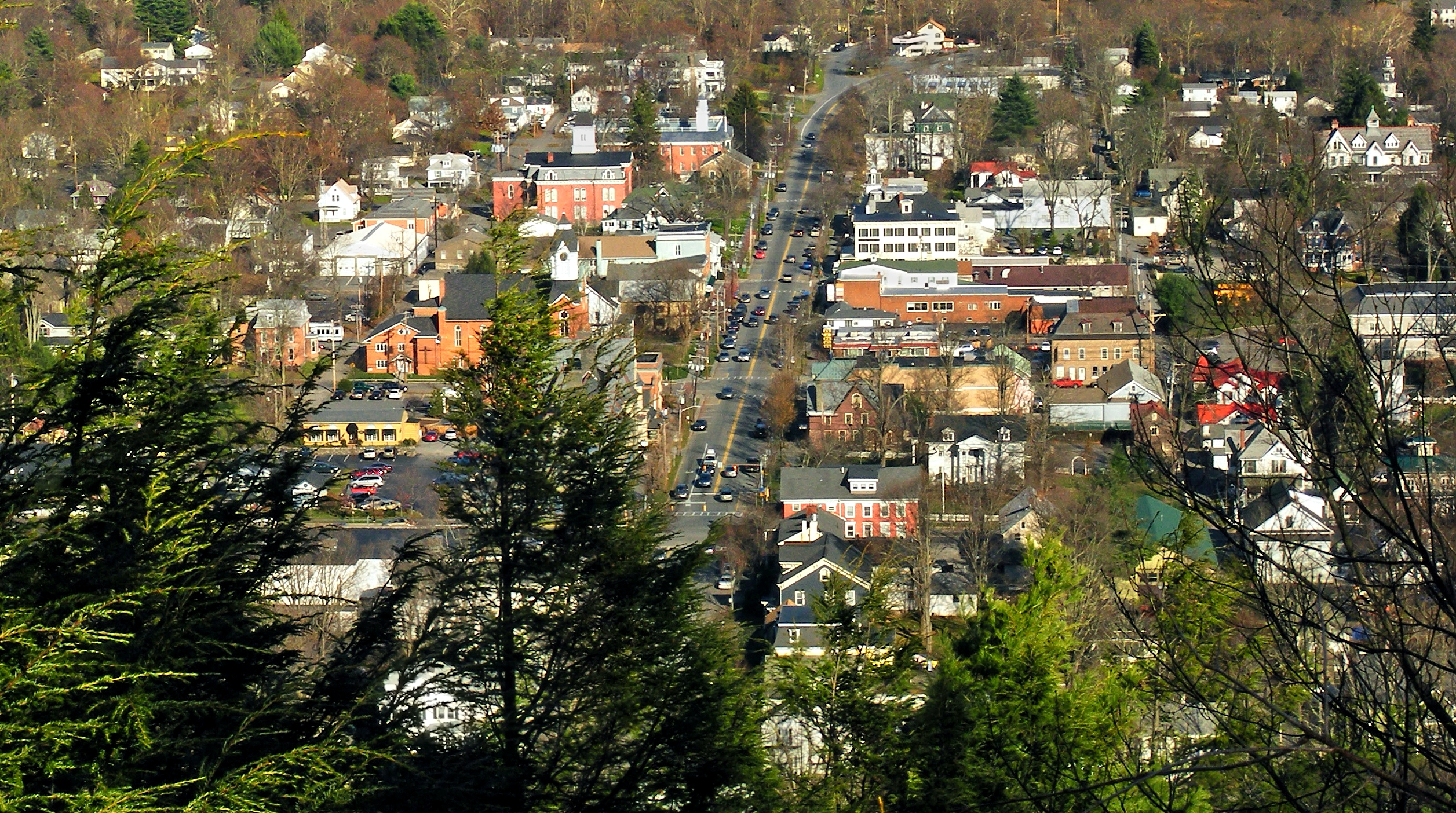
Milford viewed from "The Knob," looking east down Broad Street

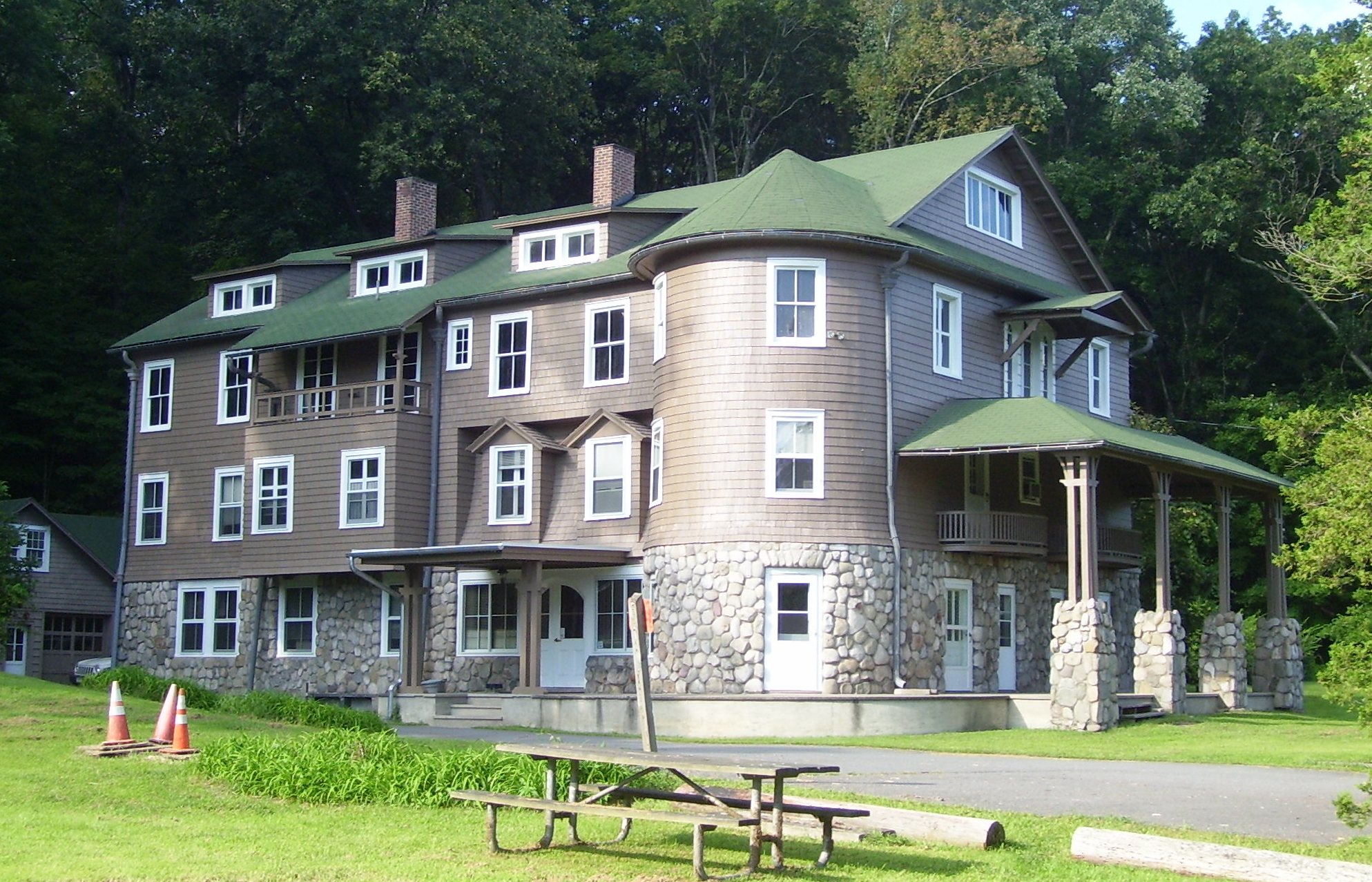
Charles S. Peirce's house

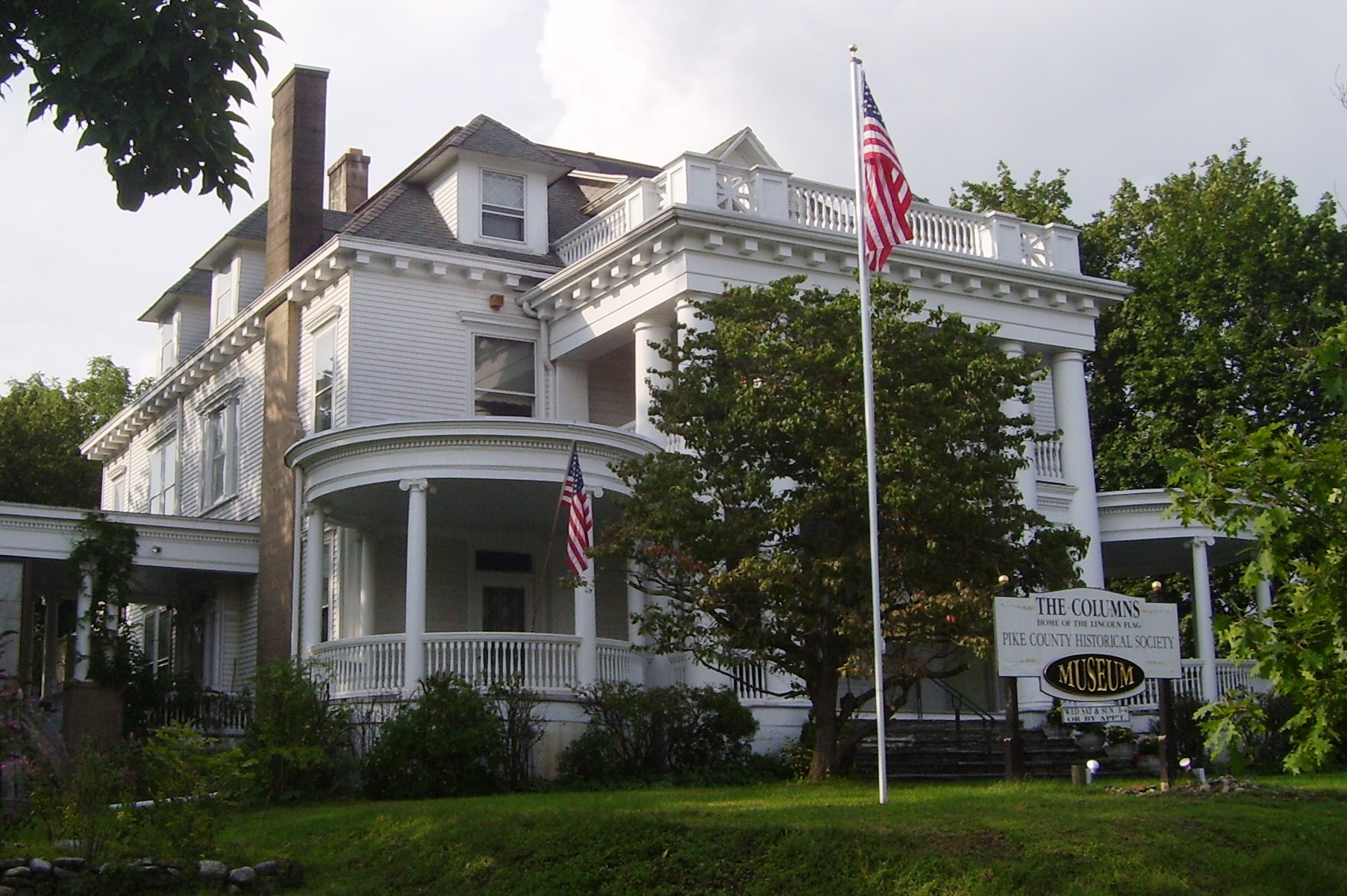
"The Columns," home of the Pike County Historical Society Museum

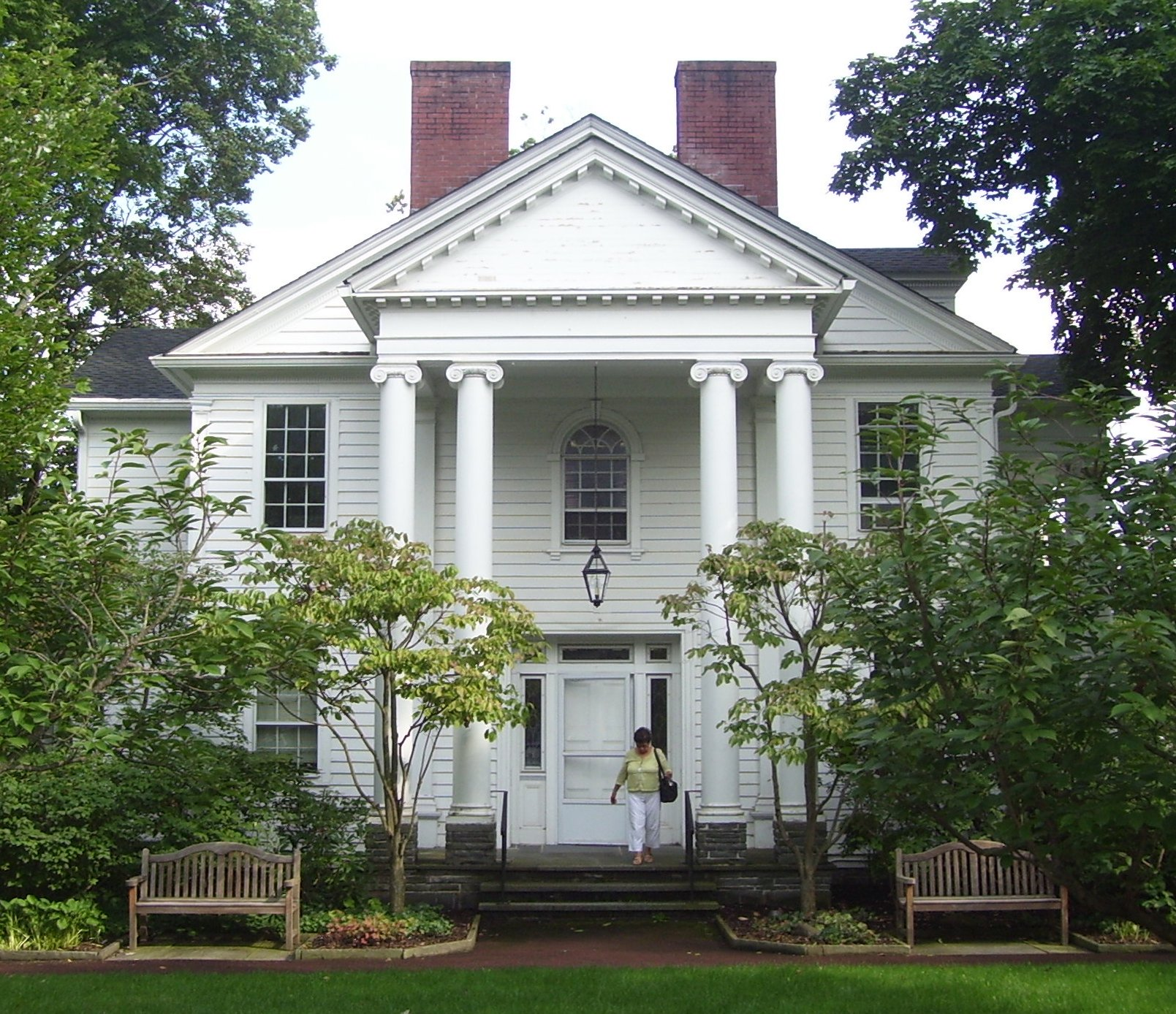
Milford Branch, Pike County Public Library

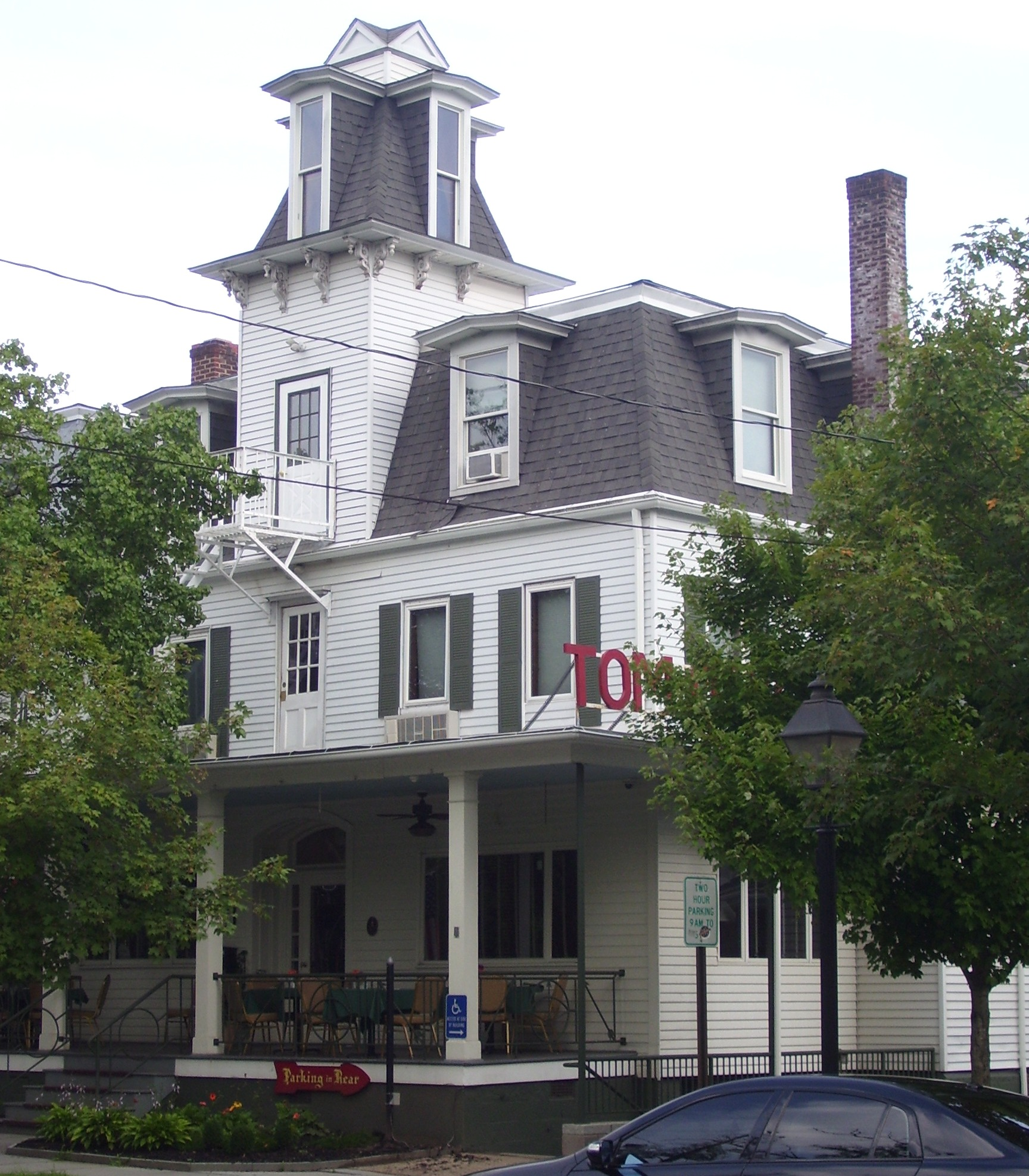
Tom Quick Inn

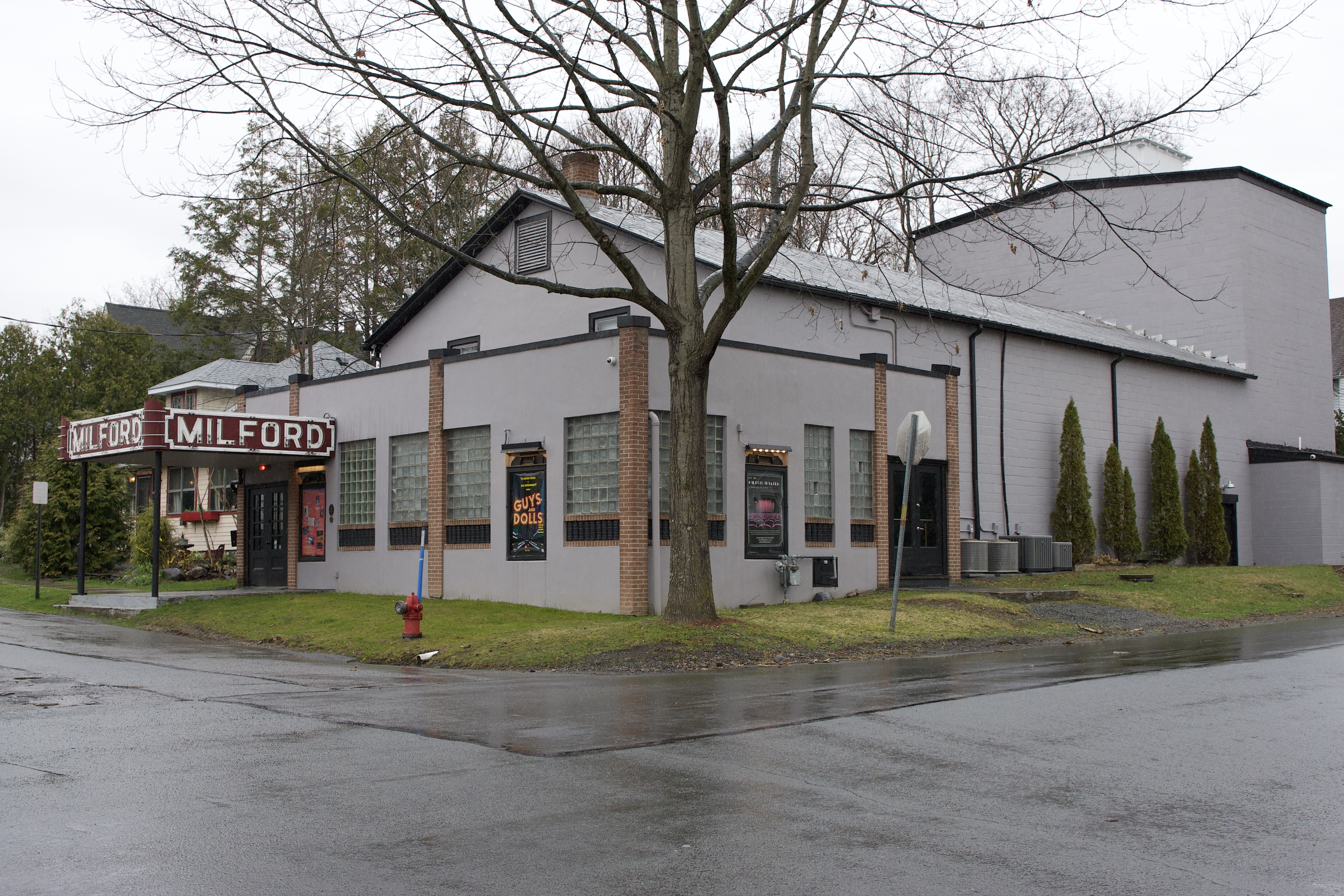
Milford Theatre

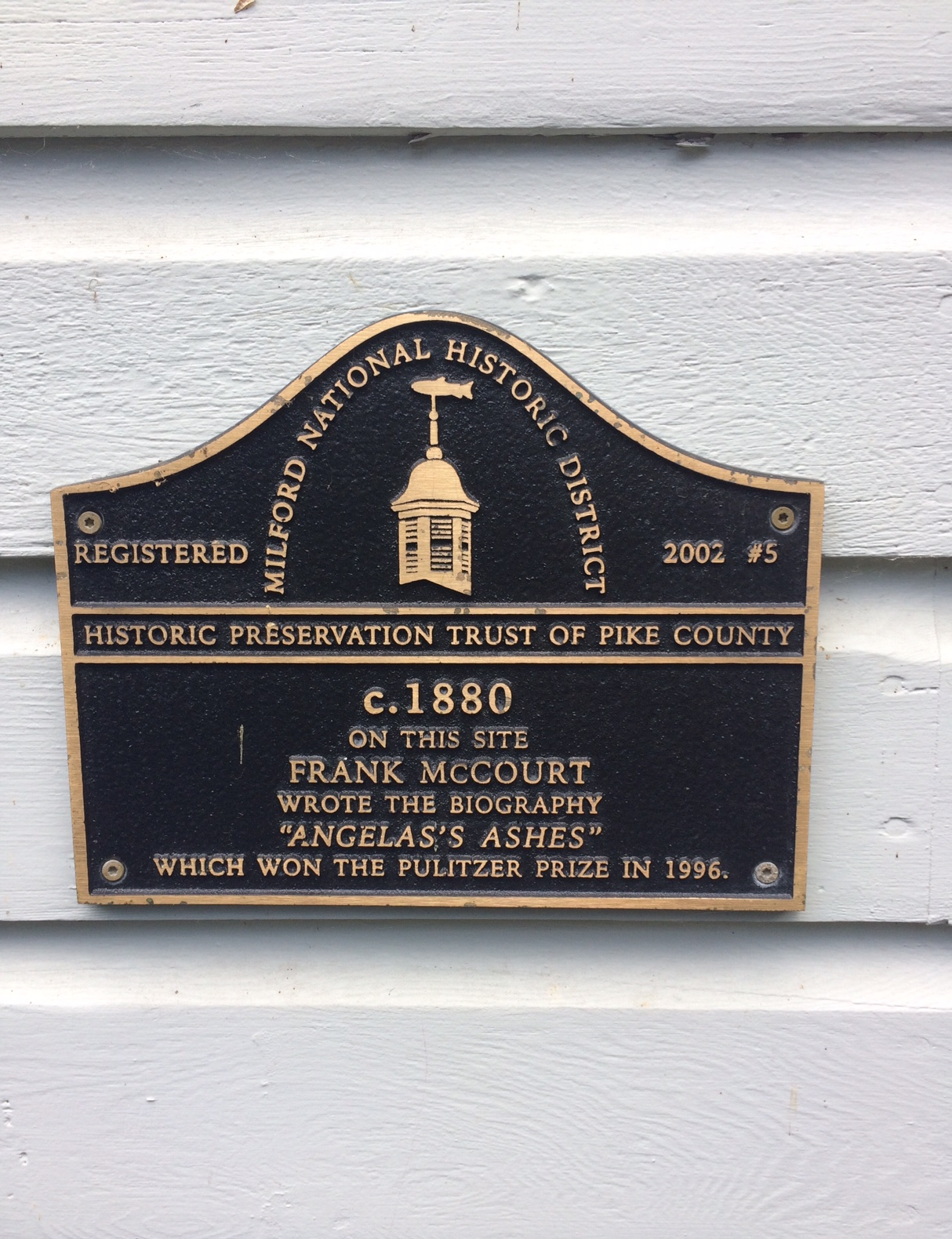
Historical sign at location where Frank McCourt wrote Angelas's Ashes

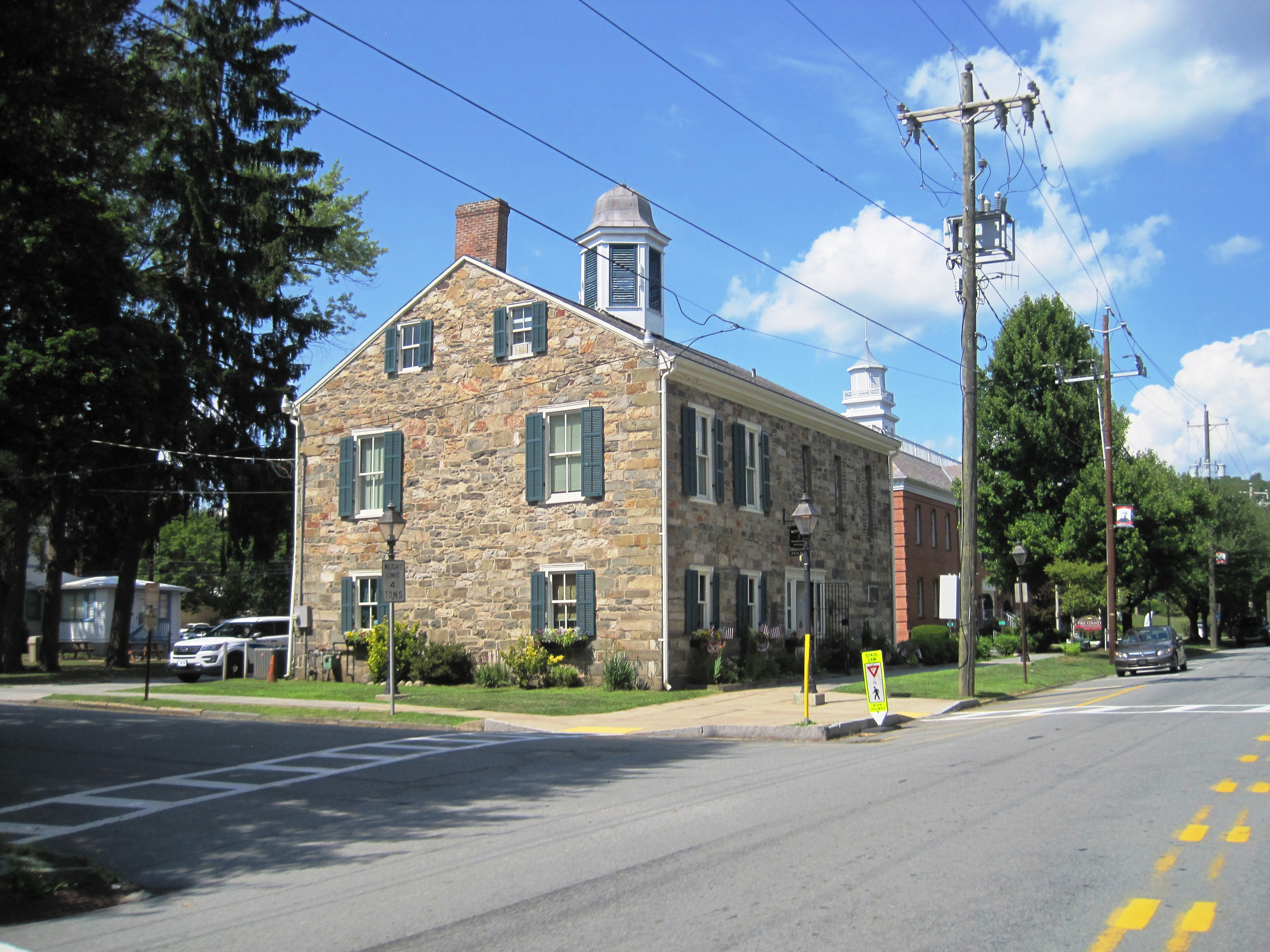
Milford Borough Hall

== See also ==
- National Register of Historic Places listings in Pike County, Pennsylvania
