= Sabbath =

Day set aside for rest and worship

In Abrahamic religions, the Sabbath (/ˈsæbəθ/) or Shabbat (Biblical Hebrew: שַׁבָּת [ʃa'bat]) is a day set aside for rest and worship. According to the Book of Exodus, the Sabbath is a day of rest on the seventh day commanded by God to be kept as a holy day of rest as God rested in the Genesis creation narrative. Sabbath observance is commanded in the Ten Commandments: "Remember the sabbath day, to keep it holy" in the Masoretic text contrasting with the Samaritan Pentateuch which says "Keep the Sabbath day to keep it holy."

A day of rest is observed in Judaism (Saturday), Christianity (Sunday), and Islam (Friday). Observances similar to or descended from the Sabbath also exist in other religions. The term may be used more generally to describe similar weekly observances in other religions.

The Sabbath might have been influenced by Babylonian mid-month rest days and lunar cycles, though its origins remain debated.

== Origins ==
Some scholars propose a cognate Akkadian word šapattu or šabattu, which refers to the day of the full moon. A lexicographic list found in the library of Ashurbanipal glosses šabattu as "[the gods'] day of the heart's rest" (ūm nûḫ libbi), although this probably refers to the appeasement of the gods' anger. Other scholars doubt that there is a connection between the biblical Sabbath and the Akkadian šapattu/šabattu, as the two words may not have a common etymology and šapattu refers almost exclusively to the fifteenth day of the month or the phenomenon of lunar alignment, not to the seventh day of a week. However, different studies found evidence that the biblical sabbath indeed sometimes had a monthly, rather than weekly, meaning.

Connection to Sabbath observance has been suggested by the designation of the seventh, fourteenth, nineteenth, twenty-first, and twenty-eighth days of a lunar month in an Assyrian religious calendar as 'holy day', also called 'evil days' (meaning "unsuitable" for prohibited activities). The prohibitions on these days, spaced seven days apart (except the nineteenth), include abstaining from chariot riding and the avoidance of eating meat by the King. On these days, officials were prohibited from various activities, and common people were forbidden to "make a wish", and at least the 28th was known as a "rest-day". This theory has also been challenged because the 'evil days' did not always fall every seven days and did not entail a general cessation of work.

The earliest extrabiblical attestation of Sabbath might occur in a 7th-century BCE ostracon discovered at the ancient fortress of Mesad Hashavyahu, which could refer to a servant doing certain kinds of work "before Sabbath" (lpny šbt). However, there is some dispute over whether šbt does indeed refer to the Sabbath or just to the act of quitting work.

== Biblical Sabbath ==
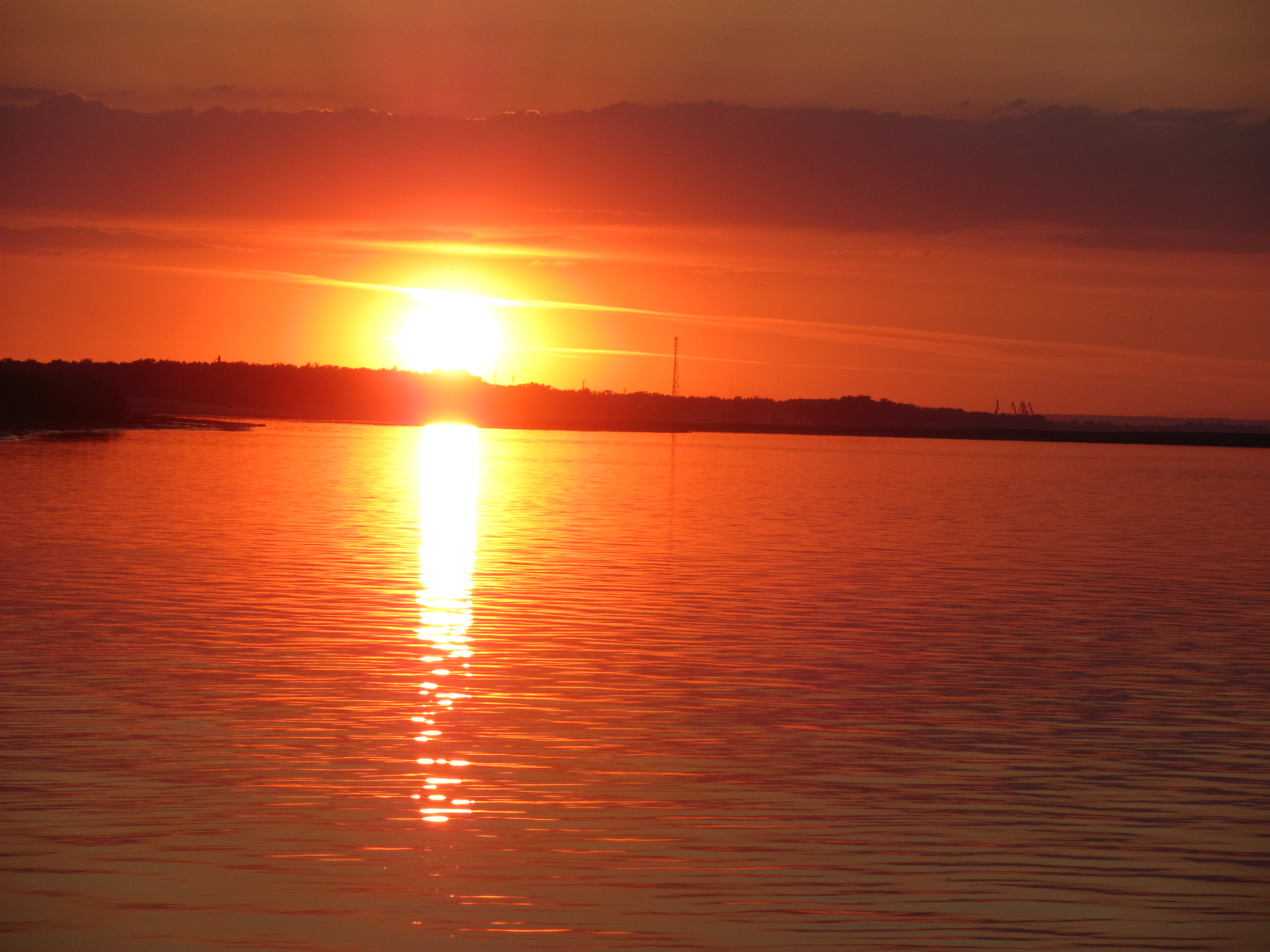
In Judaism, the Seventh-day Adventist Church, and Samaritanism, the Sabbath begins Friday at sundown and ends Saturday at sundown. Thus, sunset is a common symbol of the Sabbath.

The verbal and nominal forms of shabbat are first mentioned in the Genesis creation narrative, where the seventh day is set aside as a day of rest and made holy by God (Genesis 2:2–3).

וַיְכַ֤ל אֱלֹהִים֙ בַּיּ֣וֹם הַשְּׁבִיעִ֔י מְלַאכְתּ֖וֹ אֲשֶׁ֣ר עָשָׂ֑ה וַיִּשְׁבֹּת֙ בַּיּ֣וֹם הַשְּׁבִיעִ֔י מִכָּל־מְלַאכְתּ֖וֹ אֲשֶׁ֥ר עָשָֽׂה׃ וַיְבָ֤רֶךְ אֱלֹהִים֙ אֶת־י֣וֹם הַשְּׁבִיעִ֔י וַיְקַדֵּ֖שׁ אֹת֑וֹ כִּ֣י ב֤וֹ שָׁבַת֙ מִכָּל־מְלַאכְתּ֔וֹ אֲשֶׁר־בָּרָ֥א אֱלֹהִ֖ים לַעֲשֽׂוֹת

On the seventh day God finished the work that had been undertaken: [God] ceased on the seventh day from doing any of the work. And God blessed the seventh day and declared it holy, having ceased on it from all the work of creation that God had done.

Observation and remembrance of Shabbat is one of the Ten Commandments: the fourth commandment in Judaism and Samaritanism, the Eastern Orthodox Church, and most of Protestantism, and the third in the Catholic Church and Lutheranism.

Most Jews who observe Shabbat regard it as having been instituted as a biblical covenant between God and the Israelites in Exodus 31:13–17 as a sign of two events: the day God rested after having completed Creation (Exodus 20:8–11) and because of the Exodus (Deuteronomy 5:12–15). Most Sabbath-keeping Christians regard the Sabbath as having been instituted by God at the end of Creation and that the entire world was then, and continues to be, obliged to observe the seventh day as Sabbath.

Observance in the Hebrew Bible was universally from sixth-day sundown to seventh-day sundown according to Nehemiah 13:19 and Leviticus 23:32 in a seven-day week. The Sabbath was considered a day of joy in Isaiah 58:13 and an occasion for consultation with prophets in 2 Kings 4:23. Sabbath corporate worship was not prescribed for the community at large, and the Sabbath activities at holy sites were originally a convocation of priests to offer divine sacrifices, with family worship and rest at home. Originally, Sabbath desecration was cause for cutting off from the assembly or a capital crime according to Exodus 31:15.

The New Testament also depicts Jesus and his earliest followers participating in Sabbath observance. Jesus attends the synagogue on the Sabbath "as was his custom" (Luke 4:16), while Acts repeatedly portrays Paul attending synagogues on the Sabbath. David Wilber argues that these recurring descriptions in Luke–Acts situate the early Jesus movement within continuing Jewish Sabbath practice rather than portraying the Sabbath as having been abandoned by followers of Jesus.

== Judaism ==
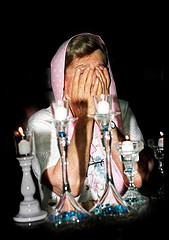
Welcoming the Sabbath with the lighting of Shabbat candles according to Jewish custom.

Shabbat in Judaism is a weekly day of rest observed from sundown on Friday until the appearance of three stars in the sky on Saturday night. There are 39 Melakhot, activities prohibited on Shabbat, listed in Tractate Shabbat of the Talmud. Customarily, Shabbat is ushered in by lighting candles shortly before sunset, at halakhically calculated times that change weekly and geographically.

Shabbat is a widely recognized hallmark of Jewish life. Several Shabbats every year are designated as Special Shabbatot, such as Shabbat haGadol before Passover and Shabbat Teshuvah before Yom Kippur.

While Jews observe Shabbat between Friday at sundown and Saturday at sundown, the classical Reform movement innovated, exemplied by some Reform rabbis such as Samuel Holdheim, who shifted his congregation's Shabbat services to Sundays in imitation of Christians' observance of their sabbath, which takes place on Sunday. (Reform Judaism has since abandoned the practice of holding Shabbat services on Sundays.)

=== Shabbaton ===
In Israel, the term Shabbaton may refer to an educational event or program, usually a celebration, held on Shabbat or over an entire weekend, with the primary focus on Shabbat. Such events are often organized by youth groups, singles groups, synagogues, schools, social groups, charitable organizations, or family reunions. They can be either multi-generational and open to all or limited to a specific group. They can be held at a location where a group usually meets or at an off-site location. The term "Shabbaton" rather than "retreat" signifies recognition of the importance of Shabbat in the event or program.

== Christianity ==
In Eastern Christianity, the Sabbath is still considered to be on Saturday, the seventh day, in remembrance of the Hebrew Sabbath.

In the Latin Church and most branches of Protestantism, Sunday, traditionally the first day of the week, is called the Lord's Day (Koine Greek: Κυριακή), for according to the Gospel, Jesus was executed on Friday and resurrected on Sunday. This symbolized the start of a New Creation, and a new and perfect Adam, or a renewal of God's relationship with humanity. Communal worship, including the Holy Mysteries, may take place on any day, but a weekly observance of the Resurrection is consistently made on Sunday. Western Christianity sometimes refers to the Lord's Day as a "Christian Sabbath," distinct from the Hebrew Sabbath, though the relationship varies.

Subbotniks or "Sabbatarians" are a Russian sect categorized as Judaizers that gained particular notoriety for their strict observance of Shabbat.

=== First-day ===
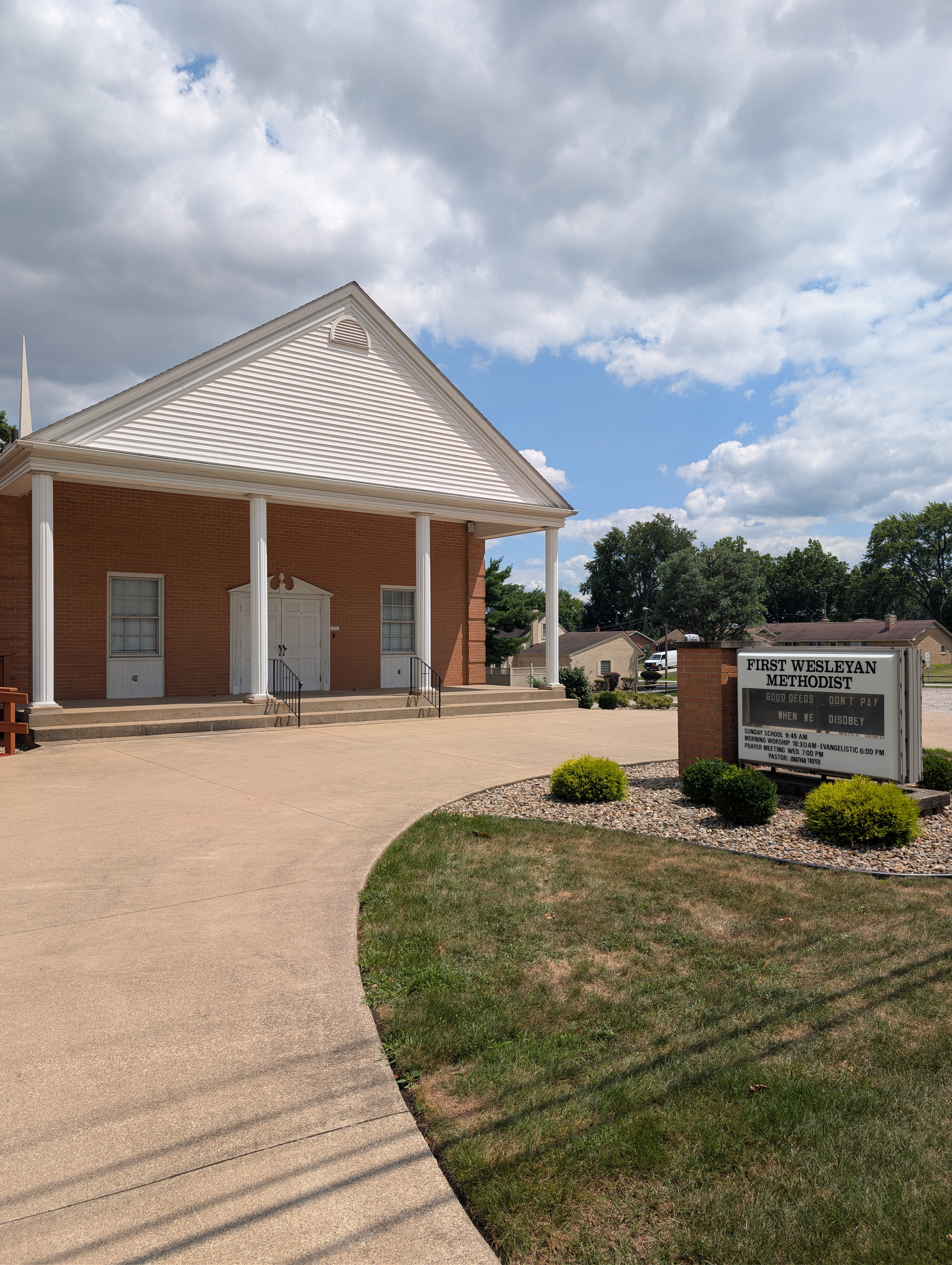
The sign of this Wesleyan Methodist church displays the times for the Sunday morning service of worship and Sunday evening service of worship, consistent with the historical First-day Sabbatarian doctrine of Methodism to keep the Lord's Day holy. The midweek Wednesday prayer service (a common Methodist observance) is indicated on the sign as well.

Since Puritan times, most English-speaking Protestants have identified the Lord's Day as the Christian Sabbath. It is considered both the first day and the "eighth day" of the seven-day week. In Tonga, all commerce and entertainment activities cease on Sunday, starting at midnight and ending the next day at midnight, as Tonga's constitution declares the Sabbath sacred forever. In Oriental Orthodox Churches, the Orthodox Tewahedo branches observe both Sunday and a Saturday Sabbath in different ways for several centuries, as have other traditions.

Puritan Sabbatarianism or Reformed Sabbatarianism is strict observance of Sabbath in Christianity that is typically characterized by its avoidance of recreational activities. "Puritan Sabbath", expressed in the Westminster Confession of Faith, is often contrasted with "Continental Sabbath": the latter follows the Continental Reformed confessions of faith such as the Heidelberg Catechism, which emphasize rest and worship on Lord's Day, but do not forbid recreational activities.

=== Seventh-day ===
Several Christian denominations observe the Sabbath similarly to Judaism, though their observance ends at Saturday sunset rather than Saturday nightfall. Early church historians Sozomen and Socrates cite the seventh day as the Christian day of worship except for the Christians in Rome and Alexandria. Many Sabbatarian Judeo-Christian groups were attested during the Middle Ages. The Waldensians, a religious group founded in the 12th century, are regarded as among the first Post-Constantinian Christian groups to observe the seventh-day Sabbath. The Szekler Sabbatarians were founded in 1588 from among the Unitarian Church of Transylvania and maintained a presence until the group converted to Judaism in the 1870s. Seventh-day Baptists have observed the Sabbath on Saturday since the mid-17th century (either from sundown or from midnight) and influenced the (now more numerous) Seventh-day Adventists in America to begin the practice in the mid-19th century. They believe that keeping seventh-day Sabbath is a moral responsibility equal to that of any of the other Ten Commandments, based on the Fourth Commandment's injunction to Remember the sabbath day, to keep it holy, as well as the example of Jesus. They also use "Lord's Day" to mean the seventh day, based on Scriptures in which God calls the day "my Sabbath" (Exodus 31:13) and "to the LORD" (Exodus 16:23) and in which Jesus calls himself "Lord of Sabbath" (Matthew 12:8). The question of defining Sabbath worldwide on a round earth was resolved by some seventh-day Sabbatarians by making use of the International Date Line, while others (such as some Alaskan Sabbatarians) keep Sabbath according to Jerusalem time. Adherents of Messianic Judaism (a Christian sect or grouping of sects) also generally observe the Sabbath on Saturdays.

=== Seventh-day versus First-day ===
In 321 AD, Roman emperor Constantine the Great enacted the first civil law regarding Sunday observance. The law did not mention the Sabbath by name, but referred to a day of rest on "the venerable day of the sun."

On the venerable day of the sun let the magistrate and people residing in cities rest, and let all workshops be closed. In the country however, persons engaged in agricultural work may freely and lawfully continue their pursuits; because it often happens that another day is not so suitable for grain growing or for vine planting; lest by neglecting the proper moment for such operations the bounty of heaven should be lost.

=== New moon ===
The new moon, which occurs every 29 or 30 days, is a separately sanctioned occasion in Judaism, Rosh Chodesh. It is not treated as a Shabbat, but some Hebrew Roots and Pentecostal churches keep the day of the new moon as a rest day from evening to evening. New moon services can last all day in these churches.

Some modern Sabbatarians have suggested a Sabbath based on the new moon, citing Psalm 104:19 and Genesis 1:14 as key prooftexts. Observers recognize the 1st, 8th, 15th, 22nd, and 29th days of the month of the Hebrew calendar as Sabbath days. They reject the seven-day week as non-biblical. Judaism dismisses the Lunar Sabbath theory as do most Sabbatarian groups as false and misleading, but the recently discovered Dead Sea Scrolls translated by Eisenman and Wise show a calendar revealing the first shabbat of the month of Nisan on the 4th day, three days after the new moon, and kept every seven days for the rest of the year. Philo of Alexandria alludes to a similar approach in the Decalogue XXX (161),

But to the seventh day of the week he has assigned [the beginning of] the greatest festivals, those of the longest duration [Unleavened Bread and Tabernacles], at the periods of the equinox both vernal and autumnal in each year; appointing two festivals for these two epochs, each lasting seven days; the one which takes place in the spring being for the perfection of what is being sown, and the one which falls in autumn being a feast of thanksgiving for the bringing home of all the fruits which the trees have produced. And seven days have very appropriately been appointed to the seventh month of each equinox, so that each month might receive an especial honour of one sacred day of festival, for refreshing and cheering the mind with its holiday.

=== Day of the Vow ===
Day of the Vow or Dingane's Day (Afrikaans Geloftedag or Dingaansdag, December 16) was the name of a religious public holiday in South Africa commemorating a famous Boer victory over the Zulu. Celebrated as an annual Sabbath (a holy day of thanksgiving) since 1838, it was renamed Day of Reconciliation in 1994. The anniversary and its commemoration are intimately connected with various streams of Afrikaner and South African nationalism.

=== Millennial Sabbath ===
Since Hippolytus of Rome in the early third century, Christians have often considered that some thousand-year Sabbath, expected to begin six thousand years after Creation, might be identical with the millennium described in the Book of Revelation. This view was also popular among 19th- and 20th-century dispensational premillennialists. The term "Sabbatism" or "Sabbatizing" (Greek Sabbatismos), which generically means any literal or spiritual Sabbath-keeping, has also been taken in Hebrews 4:9 to have special reference to this definition.

=== Spiritual Sabbath ===
Some modern Christians uphold Sabbath principles but do not limit observance to either Saturday or Sunday, instead advocating rest on any chosen day of the week as following the spirit of the Sabbath, or viewing the Sabbath as a symbolic metaphor for rest in Christ. These look upon Sabbath as a principle to be observed in spirit rather than in letter, regarding the rest offered in Jesus as the only New Testament admonishment containing the root word of "Sabbath" (Matthew 11:28) and sometimes as a more permanent rest than a day could fulfill (Hebrews 4:9).

=== Latter Day Saint Movement ===
In 1831, Joseph Smith published a revelation commanding his related movement, the Latter Day Saint movement, to go to the house of prayer, offer up their sacraments, rest from their labors, and pay their devotions on the Lord's day (D&C 59:9–12).

That thou mayest more fully keep thyself unspotted from the world, thou shalt go to the house of prayer and offer up thy sacraments upon my holy day; for verily this is a day appointed unto you to rest from your labors, and to pay thy devotions unto the Most High.

— D&C 59:9–10

Latter-day Saints believe this means performing no labor that would keep them from giving their full attention to spiritual matters (Ex. 20:10). LDS prophets have described this as meaning they should not shop, hunt, fish, attend sports events, or participate in similar activities on that day. Elder Spencer W. Kimball wrote in his The Miracle of Forgiveness that mere idle lounging on the Sabbath does not keep the day holy, and that it calls for constructive thoughts and acts.

Members of the Church are encouraged to prepare their meals with "singleness of heart" on the Sabbath (D&C 59:13) and believe the day is only for righteous activities (Is. 58:13.) In most areas of the world, this means worship on Sunday, though there is adaptation for Israel and many Muslim-majority countries.

In harmony with this revelation, members of the LDS church attend sacrament meeting each week. Other Sabbath-day activities may include: praying, meditating, studying the scriptures and the teachings of latter-day prophets, writing letters to family members and friends, reading wholesome material, visiting the sick and distressed, and attending other Church meetings.

== Islam ==
The Quran shares the six-part Abrahamic creation narrative (32:4, 50:38) and the Sabbath as the seventh day (yaum as-Sabt: 2:65, 4:47, 154, 7:163, 16:124), but God's mounting the throne after creation is taken in contradistinction to Elohim's concluding and resting from his labors. The Quran states that since the Sabbath was only for Jews, Muslims replace the Sabbath rest with jumu'ah (Arabic: جمعة). Also known as "Friday prayer", jumu'ah is a congregational prayer (salat) held every Friday (the Day of Assembly), just after midday, in place of the otherwise daily dhuhr prayer;

The Quran states: "When the call is proclaimed to prayer on Friday, hasten earnestly to the Remembrance of Allah, and leave off business: That is best for you if ye but knew" (62:9). The next verse ("When the prayer is ended, then disperse in the land ...") leads many Muslims not to consider Friday a rest day, as in Indonesia, which regards the Sunday as Sabbath; but many Muslim countries, such as Saudi Arabia and Bangladesh, do consider Friday a nonwork day, a holiday or a weekend; and other Muslim countries, like Pakistan and the United Arab Emirates, count it as half a rest day, with work ending in the early afternoon to accommodate the Jumu'ah prayers. Jumu'ah attendance is strictly incumbent upon all free adult males who are residents of a locality (excluding the travelers ).

== Samaritanism ==
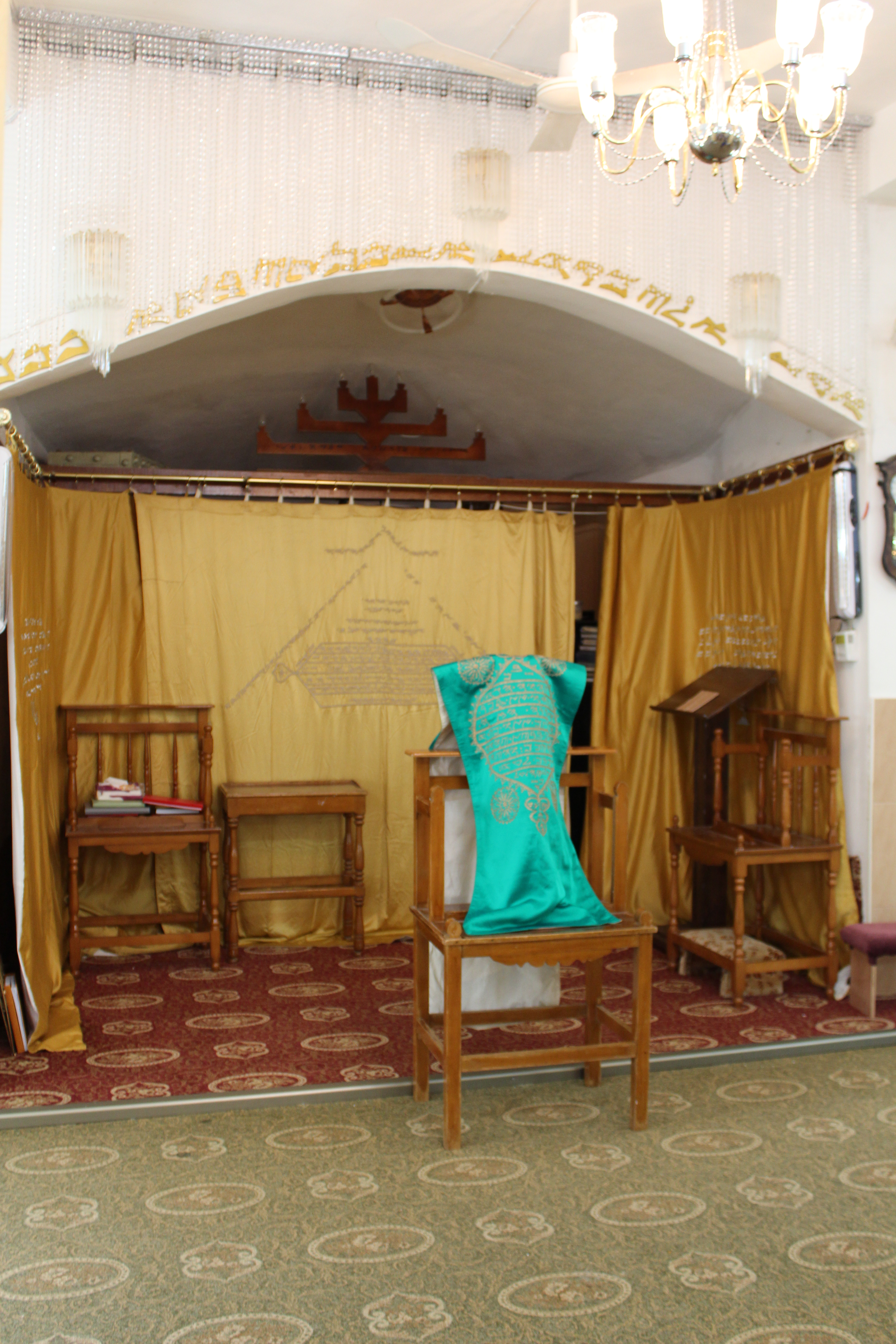
The Israelite Samaritan Sabbath prayer services are conducted weekly in their synagogue on Mount Gerizim.

The Sabbath is observed weekly by the Samaritan community every Friday to Saturday, beginning and ending at sundown, for twenty-four hours. The families gather to celebrate the rest day; all electricity in the house, except for minimal lighting (kept on the entire day), is disconnected; no work is done, nor is cooking or driving allowed. The time is devoted to worship which consists of seven prayer services (divided into two for Sabbath eve, two in the morning, one in afternoon and one at eve of conclusion), reading the weekly Torah portion (According to the Samaritan yearly Torah cycle), spending quality time with family, taking meals, rest and sleep, and within the community visiting each other is encouraged. Shabbat candles are not used in Samaritan custom and would be considered a violation of the biblical commandment of "You shall not kindle fire".

== Other religious traditions ==
=== Seven-day week ===
By synecdoche (naming the whole for a part), in Jewish sources by the time of the Septuagint, the term "Sabbath" (Greek Sabbaton, Strong's 4521) also came to mean an entire "se'nnight" or seven-day week, the interval between two weekly Sabbaths. Jesus's parable of the Pharisee and the Publican (Luke 18:9–14) describes the Pharisee as fasting "twice a week" (Greek dis tou sabbatou, literally, "Twice of the Sabbath"). Philo of Alexandria states in Decalogue XX. (96) The fourth commandment has reference to the sacred seventh day, that it may be passed in a sacred and holy manner. Now some states keep the holy festival only once in the month, counting from the new moon, as a day sacred to God; but the nation of the Jews keep every seventh day regularly, after each interval of six days; (97) and there is an account of events recorded in the history of the creation of the world, constituting a sufficient relation of the cause of this ordinance; for the sacred historian says, that the world was created in six days, and that on the seventh day God desisted from his works, and began to contemplate what he had so beautifully created; (98) therefore, he commanded the beings also who were destined to live in this state, to imitate God in this particular also, as well as in all others, applying themselves to their works for six days, but desisting from them and philosophising on the seventh day, and devoting their leisure to the contemplation of the things of nature, and considering whether in the preceding six days they have done anything which has not been holy, bringing their conduct before the judgment-seat of the soul, and subjecting it to a scrutiny, and making themselves give an account of all the things which they have said or done; the laws sitting by as assessors and joint inquirers, in order to the correcting of such errors as have been committed through carelessness, and to the guarding against any similar offences being hereafter repeated.

=== High Sabbaths ===
"High Sabbaths" are observed by Jews and some Christians. Seven annual Biblical festivals, called miqra ("called assembly") in Hebrew and "High Sabbath" in English and serving as supplemental testimonies to Sabbath, are specified in the books of Exodus and Deuteronomy; they do not necessarily fall on weekly Sabbath. Three occur in spring: the first and seventh days of Pesach (Passover), and Shavuot (Pentecost). Four occur in fall, in the seventh month, and are also called Shabbaton: Rosh Hashanah (Trumpets); Yom Kippur, "Sabbath of Sabbaths" (Atonement); and the first and eighth days of Sukkoth (Tabernacles). "High Sabbaths" is also often used as a synonym for "High Holy Days", viz., Rosh Hashanah and Yom Kippur.

=== Shmita ===
Shmita (Hebrew: שמטה, Strong's 8059 as sh^{e}mittah, literally "release"), also called sabbatical year, is the seventh (שביעי, Strong's 7637 as sh^{e}biy'iy) year of the seven-year agricultural cycle mandated by Torah for the Land of Israel, relatively little observed in Biblical tradition, but still observed in contemporary Judaism. During Shmita, the land is left to lie fallow and all agricultural activity, including plowing, planting, pruning, and harvesting, is forbidden by Torah and Jewish law. By tradition, other cultivation techniques (such as watering, fertilizing, weeding, spraying, trimming and mowing) may be performed as preventive measures only, not to improve the growth of trees or plants; additionally, whatever fruits grow of their own accord during that year are deemed hefker (ownerless), not for the landowner but for the poor, the stranger, and the beasts of the field; anyone may pick these fruits. A variety of laws also apply to the sale, consumption, and disposal of Shmita produce. When the year ended, all debts, except those owed to foreigners, were to be remitted (Deuteronomy 15:1–11); similarly, the Torah required that an enslaved person who had worked for six years be set free in the seventh year. Leviticus 25 promises bountiful harvests to those who observe Shmita, and describes its observance as a test of religious faith. The term Shmita is translated "release" five times in the Book of Deuteronomy (from the root שמט, shamat, "desist, remit", 8058).

=== Babylonian rest days ===
Counting from the new moon, the Babylonians celebrated the 7th, 14th, 21st, and 28th as holy days, also called "evil days", meaning "unsuitable" for prohibited activities. On these days, officials were prohibited from various activities, and ordinary people were forbidden to "make a wish"; at least the 28th was known as a rest day. On each of them, offerings were made to a different god and goddess. Tablets from the 6th-century BCE reigns of Cyrus the Great and Cambyses indicate these dates were sometimes approximate. The lunation of 29 or 30 days essentially consisted of three seven-day weeks followed by a final period of nine or ten days, breaking the continuous seven-day cycle. The Babylonians additionally celebrated the 19th as a special "evil day", the "day of anger", because it was roughly the 49th day of the (preceding) month, completing a "week of weeks", also with sacrifices and prohibitions.

Difficulties with Friedrich Delitzsch's origin theory connecting Shabbat with the Babylonian calendar include reconciling the differences between an unbroken week and a lunar week and explaining the absence of texts naming the lunar week as Shabbat in any language. Reconstruction of a broken tablet seems to define the rarely attested Babylonian word Sapattum or Sabattum as the full moon. This word is cognate to or the origin of the Hebrew "Shabbat", but it is observed monthly rather than weekly. It is regarded as a form of Sumerian sa-bat ("mid-rest"), attested as an um nuḫ libbi ("day of mid-repose"). This conclusion is a contextual restoration of the damaged Enūma Eliš creation myth, which is read as: "[Sa]pattu shalt thou then encounter, mid[month]ly."

The pentecontad calendar, believed to have originated from the Amorites, includes a period known to the Babylonians as Shappatum. The year is broken down into seven periods of fifty days: seven weeks of seven days, containing seven weekly Sabbaths, and an extra fiftieth day known as the atzeret "assembly", plus an annual supplement of fifteen or sixteen days, called Shappatum, the period of harvest at the end of each year. Identified and reconstructed by Hildegaard and Julius Lewy in the 1940s, the calendar's use dates back to at least the 3rd millennium BCE in western Mesopotamia and surrounding areas; it was used by the Canaanite tribes, thought by some to have been used by the Israelites before Solomon and related to the liturgical calendar of the Essenes at Qumran. Used well into the modern age, forms of it have been found in Nestorianism and among Palestinian fellaheen. Julius Morgenstern believed that the calendar of the Jubilees had ancient origins as a somewhat modified survival of the pentecontad calendar.

=== Buddhist rest day ===
The Uposatha has been observed since Gautama Buddha's time (500 BCE) and is still observed today in Theravada Buddhist countries. It occurs every seven or eight days, in accordance with the four phases of the moon. Buddha taught that Uposatha is for "the cleansing of the defiled mind", resulting in inner calm and joy. On this day, disciples and monks intensify their practice, deepen their knowledge, and express communal commitment through millennia-old acts of lay-monastic reciprocity.

Thai Chinese likewise observe their Sabbaths and traditional Chinese holidays according to lunar phases, but not on the same days as Uposatha. These Sabbaths cycle through the month with respect to the Thai solar calendar, so common Thai calendars incorporate Thai and Chinese calendar lunar dates, as well as Uposatha dates, for religious purposes.

=== Cherokee rest days ===
The first day of the new moon, beginning at sunrise, is a holiday of quiet reflection and prayer among the Cherokee. Monthly fasting is encouraged, for up to four days. Work, cooking, sex, and childbirth were also prohibited during the empty moon days, called "un-time" or "non-days"; childbirth during these days was considered unlucky. The Cherokee new year, the "great new moon" or "Hunting Moon", is the first new moon in autumn, after the setting of the Pleiades star cluster and around the time of the Leonids meteoric shower.

=== Sabbath as Saturday ===
One folk tradition in English is the widespread use of "Sabbath" as a synonym of midnight-to-midnight "Saturday" (literally, Saturn's day in at least a dozen languages): this is a simplification of the use of "Sabbath" in other religious contexts, where the two do not coincide. (Using midnight instead of sundown as a delimiter dates back to the Roman Empire.) In over thirty other languages, the common name for this day in the seven-day week is a cognate of "Sabbath". "Sabbatini", originally "Sabbadini", often "Sabatini", etc., is a very frequent Italian name form ("Sabbatos" is the Greek form), indicating a family whose ancestor was born on Saturday, Italian sabato; "Domenico" indicated birth on Sunday.

In vampire hunter lore, people born on Saturday were specially designated as sabbatianoí in Greek and sâbotnichavi in Bulgarian (rendered in English as "Sabbatarians"). It was also believed in the Balkans that someone born on a Saturday could see a vampire when it was otherwise invisible.

=== Wicca ===
The annual cycle of the Earth's seasons is called the Wheel of the Year in Wicca and neopaganism. Eight sabbats (occasionally "sabbaths", or "Sun sabbats") are spaced at approximately even intervals throughout the year. Samhain, which coincides with Halloween, is considered the first sabbat of the year.

An esbat is a ritual observance of the full moon in Wicca and neopaganism. Some groups extend the esbat to include the dark moon and the first and last quarters. "Esbat" and "sabbat" are distinct and are probably not cognate terms, although an esbat is also called "moon sabbat".

European records from the Middle Ages to the 17th century or later also place Witches' Sabbaths on similar dates to sabbats in modern Wicca, but with some disagreement; medieval reports of sabbat activity are generally not firsthand and may be imaginative, but many persons were accused of, or tried for, taking part in sabbats.

=== Unification Church ===
The Unification Church has a regular Sunday worship service. Still, every eight days, Unificationists celebrate the day of Ahn Shi Il, considered a Sabbath that cycles through the weekdays of the Gregorian calendar. The Family Pledge, formerly recited at 5:00 a.m. on Sundays, was moved to Ahn Shi Il in 1994 and includes eight verses containing the phrase "by centering on true love".

=== Baháʼí Faith ===
The day of rest in the Baháʼí Faith is Friday.

== Secular traditions ==
Secular use of "Sabbath" for "rest day", while it usually refers to the same period of time (Sunday) as the majority Christian use of "Sabbath", is often stated in North America to refer to different purposes for the rest day than those of Christendom. In McGowan v. Maryland (1961), the Supreme Court of the United States held that contemporary Maryland blue laws (typically, Sunday rest laws) were intended to promote the secular values of "health, safety, recreation, and general well-being" through a common day of rest, and that this day coinciding with majority Christian Sabbath neither reduces its effectiveness for secular purposes nor prevents adherents of other religions from observing their own holy days. Massachusetts, uncharacteristically, does not specify which day of the week its "Day of Rest" statute applies to, providing only that one day off from work is required every week; an unspecified weekly day off is a very widespread business production cycle. The Supreme Court of Canada, in R. v. Big M Drug Mart Ltd. (1985) and R. v. Edwards Books and Art Ltd. (1986), found some blue laws invalid for having no legitimate secular purpose, but others valid because they had no religious purpose.

The weekend is that period of the week set aside by custom or law for rest from labor. In many countries, the non-working days are Saturday and Sunday, so "the weekend" is often considered to begin when Friday's workday ends. This five-day workweek arose in America when labor unions attempted to accommodate Jewish Sabbath, beginning at a New England cotton mill and also instituted by Henry Ford in 1926; it became standard in America by about 1940 and spread among English-speaking and European countries to become the international workweek. China adopted it in 1995 and Hong Kong by 2006. Businesses in India and some other countries might follow either the international workweek or a more traditional plan that is similar but includes a half-day on Saturday. While Indonesia and Lebanon have the international workweek, in most Muslim countries, Friday is the weekend, alone or with Thursday (all or half) or Saturday. Some universities permit a three-day weekend from Friday to Sunday. The weekend in Israel, Nepal, and parts of Malaysia is Friday (all or half) and Saturday. Only the one-day customary or legal weekends are usually called "Sabbath".

=== State-mandated rest days ===
State-mandated rest days are widespread. Laws of the Han dynasty (206 BCE – 220 CE) required imperial officials to rest on every mu (every fifth day), within a ten-day Chinese week. The rest day was changed to huan or xún (every tenth day) in the Tang dynasty (618–907).

The reform calendar of the French Revolution was used from 1793 to 1805. It used ten-day weeks, contained in twelve months of three weeks each; the five or six extra days needed to approximate the tropical year were placed at the end of the year and did not belong to any month. The tenth day of each week, décadi, replaced Sunday as the day of rest and festivity in France.

From 1929 to 1931, the Soviet Union mandated a five-day week in which each day was designated by color as a state rest day for a different 20% of the workforce; members of the same family did not usually have the same rest day. Three weeks each year were longer (six or seven days instead of five), because those weeks were interrupted by holidays. From 1931 to 1940, the Soviets mandated a six-day workweek, with state rest days for all on the 6th, 12th, 18th, 24th, and 30th of each Gregorian month, as well as on March 1. This also necessitated varying weeks of five to seven days over the year.

Among many calendar reform proposals that eliminate the constant seven-day week in exchange for simplified calculation of calendrical data, such as weekday names for given dates, some retain Sabbatical influences. The Hermetic Lunar Week Calendar uses moon phases, resulting in weeks of six to nine days. The International Fixed Calendar and World Calendar both use 364-day years containing exactly 52 weeks (each starting on a day designated as Sunday), with an additional one or two intercalary "blank" days not designated as part of any week (Year Day and Leap Day in the International Fixed Calendar; Worldsday and Leapyear Day in the World Calendar). Supporters of reform sought to accommodate Sabbatical observance by retaining the modified week and designating the intercalary days as additional Sabbaths or holidays; however, religious leaders held that such days disrupt the traditional seven-day weekly cycle. This unresolved issue contributed to the cessation of calendar reform activities in the 1930s (International Fixed Calendar) and again in 1955 (World Calendar), though supporters of both proposals remain.

=== Subbotnik ===
The subbotnik is a weekly day of volunteer work on Saturday in Russia, other (former) Soviet republics, the Eastern Bloc, and the German Democratic Republic, sporadically observed since 1919. The voskresnik is a related volunteer workday on Sunday. They focus on community service work; "Lenin's Subbotnik" was also observed annually around his birthday.

=== Sabbatical ===
From the biblical sabbatical year came the modern concept of a sabbatical, a prolonged, often one-year hiatus in an individual's career (not usually tied to a seven-year period). Such a period is often taken to achieve a goal, such as writing a book or traveling extensively for research. Some universities and other institutional employers of scientists, physicians, or academics offer paid sabbatical as an employee benefit, called "sabbatical leave"; some companies offer an unpaid sabbatical for people wanting to take career breaks.
