= Hebrew roots =

Hebrew roots usually refers to the semitic roots of Hebrew words (שורשים, shorashim in Hebrew).

It may also refer to:

- The Hebrew Roots movement movement
