= Karl Edward Wagner =

American writer (1945–1994)

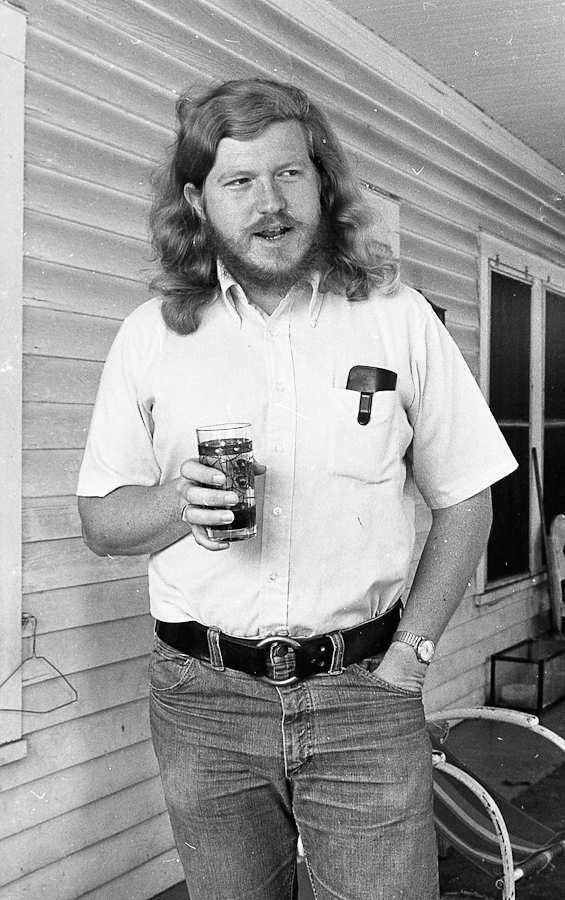
- Karl on porch, mid-1970s. Photo by David Drake.
- Born: December 12, 1945; Knoxville, Tennessee, US
- Died: October 14, 1994 (aged 48); Chapel Hill, North Carolina, US
- Spouse: Barbara Ruth Mott (1974-1986)

Karl Edward Wagner (12 December 1945 – 14 October 1994) was an American writer, poet, editor, and publisher of horror, science fiction, and heroic fantasy, who was born in Knoxville, Tennessee and originally trained as a psychiatrist.

He wrote numerous stories in the dark fantasy and horror genres, and seven novels. He is possibly best known for his creation of a series of stories featuring the character Kane. As an editor, he created a three-volume set of Robert E. Howard's Conan the Barbarian fiction restored to its original form as written, and edited the long-running and influental The Year's Best Horror Stories series for DAW Books from 1980 to 1994. Wagner's Carcosa publishing company issued four volumes of the best stories by some of the major authors of the so-called Golden Age pulp magazines.

Although he held a degree in psychiatry, he became disillusioned with the medical profession, a disenchantment evident in the stories "The Fourth Seal" and "Into Whose Hands". He described his personal philosophy as nihilistic, anarchistic and absurdist, and claimed, not entirely seriously, to be related to "an opera composer named "Richard". Wagner also admired the cinema of Sam Peckinpah, stating "I worship the film The Wild Bunch".

== Biography ==
Wagner was the fourth and youngest child of Aubrey J. Wagner and Dorothea Huber. His father was an official of the Tennessee Valley Authority. Wagner earned a history degree from Kenyon College in 1967, and a psychiatry M.D. from University of North Carolina School of Medicine. Wagner completed his residency and practiced for several years, and also studied toward a Ph.D. in neurobiology. As noted above, Wagner ultimately disliked the medical profession, which he abandoned upon establishing himself as a writer.

Wagner was productive as both a writer and editor/anthologist; see below. His friends included the writer Manly Wade Wellman, two of whose collections he published with the Carcosa publishing imprint. Peter Straub noted Wagner had a striking appearance: he was bulky and stood taller than average, with long red hair and beard, calling to mind a stereotypical member of the Hells Angels motorcycle gang.

Wagner died in his home in Chapel Hill, North Carolina, on October 14, 1994, essentially due to the consequences of longterm alcoholism. It was reported in a late 1994 issue of the Newsletter of the Horror Writers of America that Wagner's causes of death were heart failure and liver failure. Straub reports Wagner's already heavy drinking increased dramatically after his wife Barbara left him several years before his death.

Exorcisms and Ecstasies, a posthumous volume of uncollected stories, miscellany, and tributes was published by small press publisher Fedogan & Bremer in 1997. Night Shade Books has published the complete Kane stories (novels and shorts) in two hardcover volumes.

In 2020, a documentary on Wagner, The Last Wolf was released on Vimeo.

== Published works ==
Some of Wagner's work is set in Robert E. Howard's universe (featuring Conan the Barbarian and Bran Mak Morn); he also edited three volumes of Howard's original Conan tales, important to purists for being the first to restore the texts to their originally published forms. His three volumes of Echoes of Valor also featured restored versions of pulp-era fantasy stories by authors such as Fritz Leiber, C. L. Moore, Henry Kuttner, and Nictzin Dyalhis. Wagner wrote an unpublished Bran Mak Morn novel, Queen of the Night, which was originally scheduled to be published by Zebra books during 1978 and Ace Books during 1980. [Refer to David Drake's Newsletter #105 in which he states 'Queen of the Night' was never written.]

=== Kane, the Mystic Swordsman ===
Wagner created his own mystical and immortal pre-historical anti-hero, Kane, whose name and background are based on traditional conceptions of the biblical Cain. A powerful, left-handed warrior-sorcerer with red hair and blue eyes, the character was described by Wagner as one "who could master any situation intellectually, or rip heads off if push came to shove". Kane is an immortal, somewhat like the Wandering Jew (or more specifically, Charles Maturin's Melmoth the Wanderer, a novel which Wagner cites as a major influence in his essay "The Once and Future Kane"). Kane's character also includes elements of Robert E. Howard's Solomon Kane. He is an immortal, cursed to wander the Earth until he is destroyed by the violence that he himself has created. He sells his loyalty as a fighter to the highest bidder. He is a well-read and intelligent man who has traveled the world for centuries and is able to discuss music, poetry, politics, and many other subjects. He is also amoral and a born killer. The Kane stories are often classified as tales of sword and sorcery (although Wagner disliked the term), which some critics have compared favorably to those of Robert E. Howard and Michael Moorcock. In his story "The Gothic Touch", Kane actually encounters Moorcock's albino anti-hero Elric. The character Kane is considered one of the most memorable and original anti-heroes of heroic fantasy.

Inspired by the sword and sorcery adventures of Fritz Leiber's Fafhrd and the Gray Mouser, and Robert E. Howard's mighty-thewed barbarian Conan the Cimmerian, Wagner set about creating his own fantasy character while still attending medical school. The result was initially published as a 1970 paperback original with a lurid cover by West Coast pornography publisher Powell Publications. The novel's text was altered by an unknown copy editor to conform with the cover art.

After publishing a pseudonymous pornographic novel with a small New York company, Wagner relinquished his chance to become a doctor and instead decided to write full-time. During 1973, Warner Paperback library published Death Angel's Shadow, which collected the three original Kane tales (one novella, one novelette, and one short story). He also began selling his stories and poems regularly to the growing small press magazine market. Several of his tales were published in Gary Hoppenstand's Midnight Sun, a magazine initially devoted to Kane and the new school of epic fantasy writers. This was followed by publication of the first Kane novel, Bloodstone, during 1975. Warner Books commissioned a cover painting by Frank Frazetta (who had helped revive the Conan franchise, and who would paint a number of future covers for the series) and Wagner's writing career improved.

After a novel featuring Howard's Pictish hero Bran Mak Morn, Wagner's next Kane book was Dark Crusade (1976). A Kane story published elsewhere, "Two Suns Setting", won the 1977 British Fantasy Award and was also a World Fantasy Award nominee. Wagner published other Kane stories in magazines such as Chacal, Whispers and Escape! during 1977. Gerald W. Page, then editor of DAW Books Year's Best Fantasy and Horror Stories, began to reprint Kane tales in the anthology series Night Winds; a collection of six previously published Kane tales followed (Warner Books, 1978). The publisher also reissued all previous Kane books including a new edition of Darkness Weaves, which reinstated the author's preferred text.

The Book of Kane was the last published volume of Kane material (1985) until Night Shade Books' omnibus editions of novels and shorter tales.

A proposed fourth Kane novel, In the Wake of the Night, was never completed, although an excerpt was published as part of a World Fantasy Convention souvenir book of 1981; this also appears in the collection Midnight Sun (2003).

In 2004, it was reported that movie producer Lauren Moews had "acquired Death Angel's Shadow, and will produce a film based upon "Reflections for the Winter of My Soul," the first of three short stories comprising Death Angel's Shadow. The other two short stories, "Cold Light" and "Mirage," are waiting in the wings to be developed into a possible KANE franchise for Tonic Films". Lauren Moews' Tonic Films Acquires Rights to Karl Edward Wagner's Tome Death Angel's Shadow As of 2020 the film had not entered production.

=== Other writings ===
Besides the Kane books, Wagner wrote contemporary horror stories (some of which, like "At First Just Ghostly", also feature Kane). These were collected in the books In a Lonely Place (1983), Why Not You and I? (1987) and the posthumous Exorcisms and Ecstasies (1997). They range from the very literate and allusive (such as "The River of Night's Dreaming", which refers to Richard O'Brien's The Rocky Horror Show and the myth of Carcosa used in the work of Ambrose Bierce and Robert W. Chambers), to the pulpy and parodic (such as "Plan Ten from Inner Space", a crazed homage to Ed Wood's magnum opus Plan 9 from Outer Space). His later stories, such as "But You'll Never Follow Me" and "Silted In", were described by Ramsey Campbell as tormented and deeply personal; some deal explicitly with drug addiction (e.g. "More Sinned Against") and sexual subjects, including psychological repression (e.g. "Brushed Away") and transsexualism (e.g. "Lacunae").

During 1983 Wagner won the World Fantasy Award for his horror novella "Beyond Any Measure" and the British Fantasy Award during 1984 for his short story "Neither Brute Nor Human".

With his friends Jim Groce and David Drake, who were concerned that Arkham House would cease publication after the death of its founder, August Derleth, Wagner formed the Carcosa publishing house in North Carolina during 1973 to preserve the work of their favorite pulp magazine horror writers in hardcovers. Carcosa Press published four substantial volumes of horror tales: Murgunstrumm and Others by Hugh B. Cave, Far Lands, Other Days by E. Hoffmann Price, Worse Things Waiting and Lonely Vigils, both by Manly Wade Wellman. All books were edited by Wagner and illustrated profusely. A fifth collection was planned, Death Stalks the Night, by Hugh B. Cave; Lee Brown Coye was working on illustrating it when he died, causing Carcosa to abandon the project. The book was eventually published by Fedogan & Bremer. Wagner later acted as the literary agent for Manly Wade Wellman's estate.

Wagner collaborated with Drake on Killer, a science fiction horror novel set during the reign of the Roman emperor Domitian.

The illustrator of Murgunstrumm and Worse Things Waiting was the noted Weird Tales artist Lee Brown Coye. Coye's macabre designs, incorporating mysterious lattices of twigs, were the inspiration for Wagner's British Fantasy Award-winning story "Sticks". The story was later included in a revised edition of Tales of the Cthulhu Mythos.

A connoisseur of rare horror stories, Wagner perspicaciously edited many horror and fantasy anthologies; perhaps his greatest achievement of this topic was the annual anthology series The Year's Best Horror Stories (DAW Books), which he edited for fourteen years from volume VIII (1980) until volume XXII (1994). The series was canceled after Wagner's death. However, while the original editions were paperback originals, Underwood-Miller preserved the series in a set of three limited-edition hardcovers.

Wagner was a frequent visitor to London to attend fantasy and horror conventions. Though he continued to edit, producing three volumes of the heroic fantasy anthology Echoes of Valor for Tor Books during the late 1980s and early 1990s, and published a steady sequence of short stories (most of which were apparently written some years earlier), his most productive time was finished. In the story "The Gothic Touch", Kane teams up with the albino warrior-sorcerer Elric in a tribute anthology honoring the fiction of Michael Moorcock (Tales of the White Wolf).

Wagner provided the foreword to "Fat Face", a Cthulhu Mythos tale by Michael Shea published as a standalone book by Axolotl Press, 1987.

=== Audio, television and comics adaptations ===
==== Audio ====
Several Wagner works were adapted for audio cassette readings, including:

- "Sticks" Adapted by Meatball Fulton, as part of the radio series The Cabinet of Dr. Fritz. Directed by Bill Raymond. Fort Edward, NY: ZBS Foundation, 1984. (A dramatic reading of Wagner's story plus two stories by Craig Strete). This recording was re-issued by ZBZ Foundation on audio CD in 1998, combined with a story by Meatball Fulton and Tom Lopez.
- "Sticks" Unabridged reading by Patrick Macnee on Dove Audo four-cassette anthology The Greatest Horror of the 20th Century, ed. Martin Greenberg. LA: New Star Publishing, 1998.
- Night Winds. A Kane audio collection containing three stories on two cassettes; narrated by Roger Zelazny. Santa Fe, NM: Sunset Productions, 1993.
- Raven's Eyrie. A Kane story on two audio cassettes; narrated by Roger Zelazny. Santa Fe, NM: Sunset Productions, 1993.

==== Television ====
"The River of Night's Dreaming" was adapted for the TV series The Hunger during 1998.

Sticks provided the inspiration for the lattice type structures used in the television series True Detective.

==== Graphic novels ====
Wagner was involved with several comics ventures. His Kane story "In the Lair of Yslsl" (which was later incorporated into the Kane novel Dark Crusade) was adapted by Bill Whitcomb and Steve Vance, and illustrated by Vance, Wes Smith, and Bill Black for the graphic medium in Dark Phantasms 1, Summer 1976. During 1993 Wagner co-wrote the graphic novel Tell Me Dark with John Ney Reiber and Kent Williams, contributing original characters and situations. It was published by DC Comics in both hardcover and trade paperback.

At the time of his death, he had just finished compiling Exorcisms and Ecstasies, and had started working on two novels, The Fourth Seal and Tell Me, Dark, the latter based on the graphic novel he disowned.

== Bibliography ==
=== Collections ===
- In a Lonely Place (1983, reissue 2023, ISBN 9781954321786)
- Why Not You and I? (1987)
- Unthreatened by the Morning Light (1989) (Issue 2 of Author's Choice Monthly - a series published by Pulphouse Publishing. It was issued in both a limited signed hardcover of 350 copies (50 deluxe leatherbound signed and numbered 1-50; 300 limited clothbound with d.j., signed and numbered 1–300), and an unlimited perfectbound paper edition. There was also five deluxe Publisher's Copies and 25 Limited Publisher's copies)
- Exorcisms and Ecstasies (1997)
- Masters of the Weird Tale: Karl Edward Wagner (Centipede Press, 2011)
- Where the Summer Ends (Centipede Press, 2012)
- Walk on the Wild Side (Centipede Press, 2012)

=== Novels ===
- The Other Woman as by "Kent Allard". NY: Carlyle Communications/The Orpheus Series, 1973. Erotic novel.
- Killer (written with David Drake, 1985)

=== Poetry collections ===
- Songs of the Damned. Knoxvxille, TN: Village Printers/Silver Eel Press, 1981. Edited by Vern Clark and Bob Barger. Poetry chapbook issued in a 250-copy trade edition and a 50-copy signed edition. Contains nine poems.
- Red Harvest. Chapel Hill, NC: Sidecar Preservation Society, 2002. Edited by Scott F. Wyatt. Restored and corrected edition of Songs of the Damned, containing fourteen poems and with an Introduction, "The Mark of Cain" by Stephen Jones who also illustrates the volume. Also includes several pages of bibliographic updates and corrections to the bibliography of Wagner's work first published in Exorcisms and Ecstasies. Limited to 200 numbered copies in chapbook format, and a 20-copy handbound hardcover edition.

=== Short stories ===
- .220 Swift (1980)
- An Awareness of Angels (1988)
- At First Just Ghostly (1988)
- Beyond Any Measure (1982)
- Blue Lady, Come Back (1985)
- Brushed Away (1997)
- But You'll Never Follow Me (1990)
- Cedar Lane (1990)
- The Coming of Ghor (1977)
- The Dark Muse
- Deep in the Depths of the Acme Warehouse (1994)
- Did They Get You to Trade? (1992)
- The Education of Gergy-doo-doo (1997)
- Endless Night (1987)
- A Fair Cop (1991)
- Final Cut (1996)
- The Gothic Touch (1994)
- Gremlin (1995)
- Hell Creek (1993)
- I’ve Come to Talk With You Again (1995)
- In the Lair of Yslsl (1973)
- In the Middle of a Snow Dream (1994)
- In the Pines (1973, novelette)
- In the Wake of the Night (1981)
- Into Whose Hands (1983)
- Killer (1974, with David Drake)
- The Kind Men Like (1990)
- Lacunae (1986)
- Little Lessons in Gardening (1993)
- Locked Away (1995)
- Lynortis Reprise (1984)
- More Sinned Against (1984)
- Neither Brute Nor Human (1983)
- Old Loves (1985)
- One Paris Night (1992)
- Passages (1993)
- The Picture of Jonathan Collins (1995)
- Plan 10 From Inner Space (1996)
- Prince of the Punks (1995)
- The River of Night's Dreaming (1981)
- Satan's Gun (1987)
- Shrapnel (1985)
- Sing a Last Song of Valdese (1976)
- The Slug (1991)
- Stardust (1959)
- Sticks (1974)
- The Treasure of Lynortis (1984)
- Two Suns Setting (1976)
- Undertow (1977)
- A Walk on the Wild Side (1993)
- Where the Summer Ends (1980). Note: Pulphouse Publishing issued this story as a standalone volume in 1991, in both hardcover and paperback editions.

=== Kane ===
- Darkness Weaves (novel) (published in abridged and altered form 1970 as Darkness Weaves with Many Shades; restored text 1978, reissue 2014, ISBN 9780575095892)
- Death Angel's Shadow (collection) (1973, reissue 2014, ISBN 9780575095922)
- Bloodstone (novel) (1975, reissue 2014, ISBN 9780575096080)
- Dark Crusade (novel) (1976, reissue 2014, ISBN 9780575096110)
- Night Winds (collection) (1978, reissue 2014, ISBN 9780575096257)
- The Book of Kane (collection) (1985, reissue 2014, ISBN 9780575096394)
- Gods in Darkness (omnibus collection of the three novels) (2002). Issued as a 1200 copy trade edition and also as a 150 copy edition signed by the artist with an additional illustration.
- Midnight Sun: The Complete Stories of Kane (collection) (2003). Introduction "Raising Kane" by Stephen Jones. Collection of all Kane material except the three novels; companion publication to Gods in Darkness.

=== Robert E. Howard pastiches ===
- Legion from the Shadows (Bran Mak Morn novel) (1976)
- The Road of Kings (Conan novel) (1979)

=== Collections and anthologies edited ===
- Far Lands, Other Days by E. Hoffmann Price (1975)
- Murgunstrumm and Others, by Hugh B. Cave (1977)
- Worse Things Waiting, by Manly Wade Wellman (1973)
- Lonely Vigils by Manly Wade Wellman (1981)
- The Valley So Low: Southern Mountain Stories by Manly Wade Wellman (1987)
- John the Balladeer by Manly Wade Wellman (1988)
- Conan:
  - The Hour of the Dragon, by Robert E. Howard (1977)
  - The People of the Black Circle, by Robert E. Howard (1977)
  - Red Nails, by Robert E. Howard (1977)
  - The Essential Conan by Robert E. Howard. NY: SFBC Fantasy, 1998.
- The Year's Best Horror Stories
  - The Year's Best Horror Stories, VIII (1980)
  - The Year's Best Horror Stories, IX (1981)
  - The Year's Best Horror Stories, X (1982)
  - The Year's Best Horror Stories, XI (1983)
  - The Year's Best Horror Stories, XII (1984)
  - The Year's Best Horror Stories, XIII (1985)
  - The Year's Best Horror Stories, XIV (1986)
  - The Year's Best Horror Stories, XV (1987)
  - The Year's Best Horror Stories, XVI (1988)
  - The Year's Best Horror Stories, XVII (1989)
  - The Year's Best Horror Stories, XVIII (1990)
  - The Year's Best Horror Stories, XIX (1991)
  - The Year's Best Horror Stories, XX (1992)
  - The Year's Best Horror Stories, XXI (1993)
  - The Year's Best Horror Stories, XXII (1994)
- Echoes of Valor (Sword and Sorcery Anthologies)
  - Echoes of Valor (1987)
  - Echoes of Valor II (1989)
  - Echoes of Valor III (1991)

=== Critical ===
- Black Prometheus: A Critical Study of Karl Edward Wagner, ed. Benjamin Szumskyj (Gothic Press 2007; ISBN 0-913045-14-4)
- Szumskyj, Ben. "Sharpening the Silver Dagger: Karl Edward Wagner's Poetry for the Damned". Starline: Journal of the Science Fiction Poetry Association 30, No 2 (Mar-Apr 2007), 10–14.
