= Pronomianism =

Pronomianism, also called Pronomian theology or Pronomian Christianity, is a Christian theological and hermeneutical approach concerning the continuing authority and applicability of the Torah or Law of Moses for Christians. The term pronomian, meaning "pro-law", is formed in contrast to antinomianism, the Christian doctrine that believers are freed by grace from the necessity of obeying the Mosaic Law.

The term has been used in both a broad and a more specific sense. In its broader usage, pronomian describes positions affirming the continuing authority of Old Testament law and may encompass a range of views concerning which biblical laws remain directly applicable. In more recent usage, Pronomianism has been developed as the name of a pro-Torah hermeneutic maintaining the continuing relevance of the Law of Moses to Christian ethics and sanctification.

Contemporary Pronomianism is found among Christians from a variety of ecclesial backgrounds, including some communities associated with Messianic Judaism and other forms of Torah-observant Christianity. Proponents describe Pronomianism primarily as a theological or hermeneutical position rather than a denomination or ecclesial movement.

== Terminology and development ==
The term pronomian has been used descriptively for positions affirming the continuing authority of the Law of Moses, in contrast to antinomianism, which has historically denied that Christians remain obligated to observe Mosaic law. This usage predates the development of contemporary Pronomian theology.

In By This Standard (1985), Greg Bahnsen, a Reformed theologian associated with theonomy, described Christian positions concerning Old Testament law as occupying a spectrum. At one extreme he placed the view that there had been no changes in how the law should be observed, and at the other the view that Christian ethics should be restricted entirely to the New Testament. Bahnsen described the numerous positions between these poles as "some pro-nomian, some antinomian", using the terms as relative descriptions of differing degrees of continuity and discontinuity in the application of Old Testament law.

R. C. Sproul also used the terminology outside the context of contemporary Torah-observant Christianity. In the 1993 Ligonier Ministries study guide Choosing My Religion, Sproul contrasted "antinomians", meaning those opposed to law, with "pronomians", which he described as those "for God's law and all that it implies".

The terminology has also appeared in biblical scholarship. In his 2012 commentary on the Gospel of John, theologian Frederick Dale Bruner used pronomianism for a position that seeks to reincorporate observance of the Law into the Christian life after conversion. Bruner contrasted this position with antinomianism, but criticized both, arguing that pronomianism did not sufficiently recognize what he understood as the Christian's freedom from the Law. In his 2021 commentary Misunderstanding Galatians, M. I. Cha similarly emphasized continuity with Old Testament law, identifying "the perpetuity of the OT law of God" as one of his hermeneutical presuppositions and arguing for the continuing applicability of the Mosaic law to Christians.

By the early 2020s, Pronomianism was being used more specifically for a Christian theological and hermeneutical position affirming the continuing applicability of the Torah. In 2021, Pronomian Publishing was established to publish and promote works by Pronomian teachers and scholars. Szumskyj's 2024 doctoral dissertation attempted to formulate Pronomianism systematically as a hermeneutical approach. In another 2024 doctoral dissertation, Gregory Scott McKenzie used Pronomian and pro-Torah interchangeably and developed what he called a "Pronomian paradigm" as a Christocentric approach to theology and apologetics.

Cha subsequently employed the terminology explicitly in his 2026 study Hebrews 7–10 and Ezekiel's Temple, describing his interpretation of Hebrews 7–10 as "pronomian rather than antinomian" and associating this reading with the continuing validity of the Law of Moses. That same year, Benjamin Szumskyj and David Wilber edited An Introduction to Pronomianism: Essays on One Torah Theology in Modern Christianity, a collection of essays examining Pronomian approaches to Scripture, covenants, dietary laws, the Sabbath, and other issues concerning the application of the Torah in Christianity.

== Contemporary Pronomian theology ==
In his systematic formulation of Pronomianism, Szumskyj defines it as a "pro-Torah hermeneutic" that approaches the biblical canon as a unified whole and regards obedience to divine commandments as part of Christian sanctification. In this formulation, obedience does not bring about salvation or contribute to justification, but is understood as a consequence of salvation and a component of sanctification.

Contemporary Pronomian writers emphasize continuity between the Old and New Covenants and reject the position that the Torah became wholly inapplicable to Christians with the inauguration of the New Covenant. Szumskyj's formulation also rejects the traditional tripartite division of Mosaic law into moral, ceremonial, and civil categories, maintaining instead that the commandments form an integrated body of instruction. He distinguishes the continuing authority of a commandment from the manner of its application, allowing commandments to be applied literally or according to their underlying principles depending upon their subject and circumstances.

Pronomian interpretations consequently differ from other Christian approaches that regard some Mosaic commandments, such as ceremonial or civil laws, as no longer binding while maintaining the continuing authority of moral laws. Pronomian writers instead address the seventh-day Sabbath, dietary laws, and biblical festivals in terms of their continuing applicability to Christians.

New Testament passages concerning the law are central to Pronomian interpretation. Matthew 5:17–20, in which Jesus states that he came not to abolish the Law or the Prophets but to fulfill them, is interpreted by Pronomian writers as affirming the continuing authority of the Torah rather than its abolition. A 2025 master's thesis by Ethan Lunik similarly characterized its interpretation of Matthew 5:17 as pronomian. Based on an analysis of the Greek verb πληρόω ("fulfill") in the sayings of Jesus, Lunik argued that the verb has a constructive sense in Matthew 5:17 and that the passage supports the continuing relevance of the Law of Moses for Christian practice. Pronomian authors have likewise examined passages in Acts, Romans, Galatians, Colossians, and Hebrews that figure prominently in Christian debates over the continuing applicability of Mosaic law.

Contemporary Pronomian writers do not necessarily agree about the application of every Mosaic commandment. Pronomianism therefore encompasses some variation in how the continuing authority of the Torah is understood and applied. This diversity resembles Bahnsen's earlier use of pro-nomian as a relative description of positions along a spectrum of continuity and discontinuity in biblical law, although contemporary Pronomianism uses the term in a more specific theological sense.

== Relationship to Messianic Judaism and Torah-observant Christianity ==
Pronomianism has substantial overlap with Messianic Judaism and other forms of Torah-observant Christianity, while remaining distinct as a theological position. Benjamin G. Frostad distinguishes Pronomianism from the social and ecclesial identities of communities in which Torah observance occurs, noting that Pronomian views may be held within different congregational and denominational settings.

Messianic Judaism developed primarily around Jewish followers of Jesus seeking to maintain Jewish identity and communal life, and Torah observance has become an important feature of many Messianic Jewish communities. Pronomian theology shares with some forms of Messianic Judaism an emphasis on the continuing relevance of the Torah, although Messianic Jewish approaches differ concerning the extent to which its commandments apply to Jewish and non-Jewish believers.

Pronomian views are also found among non-Jewish Christians and in communities outside Messianic Judaism. Frostad describes Torah-oriented congregations and ministries that developed outside specifically Messianic Jewish settings and notes that people holding Pronomian views may participate in conventional Christian churches, Messianic congregations, or independent Torah-oriented fellowships. Pronomianism is therefore defined primarily by its theological position concerning the continuing applicability of the Torah rather than by a particular ethnic identity, denomination, or congregational affiliation.

== See also ==
- Antinomianism
- Biblical law in Christianity
- Christian views on the Old Covenant
- Christianity and Judaism
- Law of Moses
- Sabbath in Christianity
- Sabbatarianism
- Theonomy
- Messianic Judaism
- Sacred Name movement
- Hebrew Roots movement
