= David Wilber (writer) =

American writer

- Education: Charlotte Christian College and Theological Seminary (BA)
- Occupations: Writer, Bible teacher
- Website: davidwilber.com

David Wilber is an American writer and Bible teacher whose work focuses on biblical law, Sabbath observance, and Messianic Judaism. He is associated with Pronomian theology, a theological position that maintains the continuing relevance of the Law of Moses for Christians.

== Writing and theology ==
Wilber's writing focuses primarily on the relationship between Christianity and the Law of Moses, including the Sabbath, biblical festivals, and the interpretation of New Testament passages concerning the Torah. He describes his theological approach as Pronomian.

In 2025, Wilber published Born Again to a Living Hope: A Messianic Commentary on 1 Peter. Reviews of the book have discussed its Pronomian and post-supersessionist approach to the First Epistle of Peter, including its treatment of Petrine authorship, the letter's audience, and the relationship between Christian practice and the Torah. The Torah Apologetics review also highlighted the commentary's combination of textual interpretation and practical application.

Wilber's 2024 book How Jesus Fulfilled the Law: A Pronomian Pocket Guide to Matthew 5:17–20 examines Matthew 5:17–20 and argues that Jesus' statement that he came to "fulfill" the law should not be understood as abolishing the Law of Moses. Instead, Wilber interprets the passage as affirming the law's continuing relevance for Christian faith and practice.

Wilber's 2022 book Remember the Sabbath: What the New Testament Says About Sabbath Observance for Christians argues for continued seventh-day Sabbath observance among Christians. A review in The Messianic Light described the book as a documented defense of Sabbath observance based primarily on New Testament passages and noted Wilber's use of scholarly literature representing differing positions on the subject.

In A Christian Guide to the Biblical Feasts, Wilber discusses the biblical festivals from a Christian perspective and argues for their continuing relevance to Christians. A review in The Messianic Light discussed the book's treatment of the festivals and its approach to the continuing relevance of the Torah.

== Academic work ==
Wilber earned a Bachelor of Arts in Biblical Studies from Charlotte Christian College and Theological Seminary, where he was valedictorian of his graduating class.

Wilber has published peer-reviewed articles in the American Journal of Biblical Theology. His 2023 article "The Book of Jubilees is Not Inspired Scripture" examines the historical value and canonical status of the Book of Jubilees, arguing against its recognition as inspired scripture.

Two subsequent articles address Trinitarian interpretations of the Epistle to the Hebrews. "The Divine Son in Hebrews 1", published in 2024, argues from Hebrews 1 for the divinity of Jesus. "The Spirit's Divine Nature and Personhood in Hebrews", published in 2025, examines the epistle's portrayal of the Holy Spirit and argues that it is consistent with a Trinitarian understanding of the Spirit as divine and personally distinct from the Father and the Son.

In 2025, Wilber contributed the chapter "Following the Law of Moses in a Christlike Way: A Pronomian Reading of 'Law of Christ' in Galatians 6:2 and 1 Corinthians 9:21" to A Disciple Named Timothy: Essays in Honor of Tim Hegg on His 75th Birthday. The chapter examines Paul's use of the expression "law of Christ" in Galatians 6 and 1 Corinthians 9 and argues for its continuity with the Law of Moses.

Wilber's article "Sabbath Observance in Luke-Acts: Situating the Earliest Followers of Jesus Within Judaism" was published in the E-Journal of Religious and Theological Studies in 2025. The article argues that the Gospel of Luke and Acts of the Apostles portray the earliest followers of Jesus as continuing to observe the Sabbath. The article is indexed in the Directory of Open Access Journals.

Wilber and Benjamin Szumskyj co-edited An Introduction to Pronomianism: Essays on One Torah Theology in Modern Christianity, a collection of essays on Pronomian theology published by McFarland in 2026.

In October 2026, Wilber published "'One Woman in Addition to Another': Leviticus 18:18 as a Prohibition of Polygamy" in Faith • Civilization • Theology. The article argues that Leviticus 18:18, traditionally interpreted as prohibiting marriage to two sisters simultaneously, instead prohibits polygyny generally.

== Selected works ==
=== Books ===
- A Christian Guide to the Biblical Feasts (2018)
- When Faith Works: Living Out the Law of Liberty According to James (2019)
- Is God a Misogynist? Understanding the Bible's Difficult Passages Concerning Women (2020)
- Remember the Sabbath: What the New Testament Says About Sabbath Observance for Christians (2022)
- How Jesus Fulfilled the Law: A Pronomian Pocket Guide to Matthew 5:17–20 (2024)
- Born Again to a Living Hope: A Messianic Commentary on 1 Peter (2025)
- Pseudo-Scripture: Why 1 Enoch, Jubilees, and Jasher Are Not Inspired Scripture (2026)

=== Edited works ===
- An Introduction to Pronomianism: Essays on One Torah Theology in Modern Christianity, with Benjamin Szumskyj (McFarland, 2026)

=== Articles and chapters ===
- "The Book of Jubilees is Not Inspired Scripture". American Journal of Biblical Theology. 24 (43). 2023.
- "The Divine Son in Hebrews 1". American Journal of Biblical Theology. 25 (48). 2024.
- "Sabbath Observance in Luke-Acts: Situating the Earliest Followers of Jesus Within Judaism". E-Journal of Religious and Theological Studies. 11 (3): 51–59. 2025. doi:10.38159/erats.20251131
- "Following the Law of Moses in a Christlike Way: A Pronomian Reading of 'Law of Christ' in Galatians 6:2 and 1 Corinthians 9:21". In Rob Vanhoff and C. M. Hegg (eds.), A Disciple Named Timothy: Essays in Honor of Tim Hegg on His 75th Birthday. TorahResource. pp. 201–212. 2025.
- "The Spirit's Divine Nature and Personhood in Hebrews". American Journal of Biblical Theology. 26 (50). 2025.
- "A New Testament Case for Christian Sabbath Observance". In Benjamin Szumskyj and David Wilber (eds.), An Introduction to Pronomianism: Essays on One Torah Theology in Modern Christianity. Jefferson, North Carolina: McFarland & Company. 2026.
- "'One Woman in Addition to Another': Leviticus 18:18 as a Prohibition of Polygamy." Faith • Civilization • Theology. 2 (1). 2026.
