= Echoes of Valor =

- cover of the first edition
- Author: Karl Edward Wagner (editor)
- Cover artist: Ken W. Kelly
- Language: English
- Series: Echoes of Valor
- Genre: Fantasy short stories
- Publisher: Tor Books
- Publication date: 1987
- Publication place: United States
- Media type: Print (paperback)
- Pages: 286
- ISBN: 0-8125-5750-6
- Followed by: Echoes of Valor II

Echoes of Valor is an American anthology of fantasy stories, edited by Karl Edward Wagner. It was first published in paperback by Tor Books in February 1987. Each story falls within the sword and sorcery subgenre.

The book collects three classic fantasy novellas by Robert E. Howard, Fritz Leiber, and Henry Kuttner. It is notable for issuing the original version of Howard's Conan story "The Black Stranger" for the first time in print (the story had previously appeared in various versions revised by L. Sprague de Camp).

== Contents ==
- "The Black Stranger" (Robert E. Howard)
- "Adept's Gambit" (Fritz Leiber)
- "Wet Magic" (Henry Kuttner)
