= The Book of Kane =

- Cover of the first edition
- Author: Karl Edward Wagner
- Illustrator: Jeffrey Jones
- Cover artist: Jeffrey Jones
- Language: English
- Series: Kane
- Genre: Fantasy
- Publisher: Donald M. Grant, Publisher, Inc.
- Publication date: 1985
- Publication place: United States
- Media type: Print (hardback)
- Pages: 224
- ISBN: 0-937986-72-0
- OCLC: 13115244

The Book of Kane is a collection of fantasy short stories by American writer Karl Edward Wagner, featuring his character Kane. It was first published in 1985 by Donald M. Grant, Publisher, Inc. in an edition of 2,125 copies, of which 425 copies were signed and slipcased. The first story first appeared in Wagner's earlier collection Death Angel's Shadow. The other stories originally appeared in the magazines Sorcerer's Apprentice, Escape! and Chacal. The collection is illustrated by Jeffrey Jones.

== Contents ==
- "Reflections for the Winter of My Soul"
- "Misericorde"
- "The Other One"
- "Sing a Last Song of Valdese"
- "Raven’s Eyrie"

== Sources ==
- Brown, Charles N.; William G. Contento (2007-11-20). "The Locus Index to Science Fiction (1984-1998)".
- Chalker, Jack L.; Mark Owings (1998). The Science-Fantasy Publishers: A Bibliographic History, 1923-1998. Westminster, MD and Baltimore: Mirage Press, Ltd. p. 331.
