= Echoes of Valor III =

Anthology of fantasy stories

- cover of the first edition
- Author: Karl Edward Wagner (editor)
- Cover artist: Sam Rakeland
- Language: English
- Series: Echoes of Valor
- Genre: Fantasy short stories
- Publisher: Tor Books
- Publication date: 1991
- Publication place: United States
- Media type: Print (hardcover)
- Pages: 374 pp
- ISBN: 0-8125-5758-1
- Preceded by: Echoes of Valor II

Echoes of Valor III is an anthology of fantasy stories, edited by Karl Edward Wagner. It was first published in paperback by Tor Books in September 1991. Each story falls within the sword and sorcery subgenre (except for "Shadow of the Vulture" by Robert E. Howard).

The book collects eight classic fantasy short stories by various authors, along with associated commentary.

== Contents ==
- "The Shadow of the Vulture" (Robert E. Howard)
- "Cursed Be the City" (Henry Kuttner)
- "The Citadel of Darkness" (Henry Kuttner)
- "Hok Goes to Atlantis" (Manly Wade Wellman)
- "Wolves of Darkness" (Jack Williamson)
- "Nictzin Dyalhis: Mysterious Master of Fantasy" (Sam Moskowitz)
- "The Red Witch" (Nictzin Dyalhis)
- "The Sapphire Goddess" (AKA "The Sapphire Siren") (Nictzin Dyalhis)
- "The Sea-Witch" (Nictzin Dyalhis)
