= Echoes of Valor II =

- Ccover of the first edition.
- Author: Karl Edward Wagner (editor)
- Cover artist: Rich Barry
- Language: English
- Series: Echoes of Valor
- Genre: Fantasy short stories
- Publisher: Tor Books
- Publication date: 1989
- Publication place: United States
- Media type: Print (hardcover)
- Pages: 274
- ISBN: 0-312-93189-1
- Preceded by: Echoes of Valor
- Followed by: Echoes of Valor III

Echoes of Valor II is an American anthology of fantasy stories, edited by Karl Edward Wagner. It was first published in hardcover by Tor Books in August 1989. Tor subsequently issued a trade paperback edition in 1993. Each story falls within the sword and sorcery subgenre.

The book collects nine classic fantasy short stories by various authors, along with associated commentary by the editor and personages associated with the stories. It is notable for issuing the two original versions of Howard's Conan story "The Frost-Giant's Daughter", one for the first time since its original publication, and the other for the first time in print.

== Contents ==
- "Introduction: Robert E. Howard" (Karl Edward Wagner)
  - "The Frost King's Daughter" (also known as "Gods of the North"; Robert E. Howard)
  - "The Frost-Giant's Daughter" (Robert E. Howard)
- "Introduction: C. L. Moore" (Karl Edward Wagner)
  - "An Autobiographical Sketch of C. L. Moore" (C. L. Moore)
  - "Quest of the Starstone" (C. L. Moore and Henry Kuttner)
  - "Nymph of Darkness" (C. L. Moore and Forrest J. Ackerman)
  - "The Genesis of an Invisible Venusienne" (Forrest J. Ackerman)
  - "The 'NYMPH' o' ManiAck" (Forrest J. Ackerman)
  - "Werewoman" (C. L. Moore)
  - "Foreword to 'Song in a Minor Key'" (Sam Moskowitz)
  - "Song in a Minor Key" (C. L. Moore)
- "Introduction: Leigh Brackett and Ray Bradbury" (Karl Edward Wagner)
  - "Lorelei of the Red Mist" (Leigh Brackett and Ray Bradbury)
- "Introduction: Manly Wade Wellman" (Karl Edward Wagner)
  - "Hok Visits the Land of Legends" (Manly Wade Wellman)
  - "Untitled Hok Fragment" (Manly Wade Wellman)
