= The Magic of Atlantis =

1970 anthology edited by Lin Carter

- Cover of the first edition.
- Author: edited by Lin Carter
- Cover artist: Ron Walotsky
- Language: English
- Genre: Fantasy
- Publisher: Lancer Books
- Publication date: 1970
- Publication place: United States
- Media type: Print (Paperback)
- Pages: 191
- OCLC: 8732859

The Magic of Atlantis is an anthology of fantasy short stories, edited by Lin Carter. It was first published in paperback by Lancer Books in November 1970.

== Summary ==
The book collects seven fantasy tales by various authors set on the fictional lost continent of Atlantis, with an introduction by Carter.

== Contents ==
- "Beyond the Pillars of Hercules" (introduction) (Lin Carter)
- "The Mirrors of Tuzun Thune" (Robert E. Howard)
- "The Spawn of Dagon" (Henry Kuttner)
- "The Eye of Tandyla" (L. Sprague de Camp)
- "The Seal of Zaon Sathla" (Lin Carter)
- "The Vengeance of Ulios" (Edmond Hamilton)
- "The Death of Malygris" (Clark Ashton Smith)
- "Heart of Atlantan" (Nictzin Dyalhis)
