= The Sapphire Goddess: The Fantasies of Nictzin Dyalhis =

2018 collection of short stories by Nictzin Dyalhis

- Cover of first edition
- Author: Nictzin Dyalhis
- Cover artist: Margaret Brundage
- Language: English
- Genre: fantasy, science fiction
- Publisher: DMR Books
- Publication date: 2018
- Publication place: United States
- Media type: print (paperback), ebook
- Pages: 387
- ISBN: 978-0-9909900-5-5

The Sapphire Goddess: The Fantasies of Nictzin Dyalhis is a collection of fantasy and science fiction short stories by American writer Nictzin Dyalhis. It was first published in by DMR Books, appearing in paperback in March 2018, and as an ebook in June of the same year.

== Summary ==
The book collects eight novelettes and one short story by the author, together with an introduction by the publisher, D. M. Ritzlin. It gathers together for the first time most of Dyalhis's published fiction, originally appearing from 1925 to 1940 in the magazines Weird Tales and Ghost Stories. (Four other pieces, originally published in the magazines Adventure and Underworld, are omitted.) "When the Green Star Waned" and its sequel "The Oath of Hul Jok" are science fiction genre. The others stories are occult fantasy. In "The Eternal Conflict" and "The Dark Lore" adventurers on the astral plane encounter the traditional Judaeo-Christian Hell. "He Refused to Stay Dead," "The Red Witch," "The Sapphire Goddess," "The Sea-Witch" and "The Heart of Atlantan" feature souls that transmigrate across time or reincarnate to enact conflicts from the past.

== Contents ==
- "Introduction" (D. M. Ritzlin)
- "When the Green Star Waned" (from Weird Tales v. 5, no. 4, Apr. 1925)
- "The Eternal Conflict" (from Weird Tales v. 6, no. 4, Oct. 1925)
- "He Refused to Stay Dead" (with Eric Marston (uncredited)) (from Ghost Stories v. 2, no. 5, Apr. 1927)
- "The Dark Lore" (from Weird Tales v. 10, no. 4, Oct. 1927)
- "The Oath of Hul Jok" (from Weird Tales v. 12, no. 3, Sep. 1928)
- "The Red Witch" (from Weird Tales v. 19, no. 4, Apr. 1932)
- "The Sapphire Goddess" (from Weird Tales v. 23, no. 2, Feb. 1934)
- "The Sea-Witch" (from Weird Tales v. 30, no. 6, Dec. 1937)
- "Heart of Atlantan" (from Weird Tales v. 35, no. 5, Sep. 1940)

== Reception ==
Fletcher Vredenburgh, reviewing the collection on blackgate.com, writes "Nictzin Dyahlis was not a great writer. ... His writing can be clunky, and far too often things are 'terrible' and 'best unrelated'. ... He relied on the same motifs — reincarnation, past lives — too frequently ... He was, however, a good storyteller. His tales are fantastically compelling in their absolute over-the-top imagery and narratives. He knew how to grab a reader’s attention and then hold on to it until he reached the end." He concludes "Anyone with a taste for pulp should give this book a look, and everyone should give Dave Ritzlin thanks for helping preserve and promote another author from the early days of fantasy."
