= Kane (fantasy) =

Fictional character created by Karl Edward Wagner

Kane is a fictional character created by American author Karl Edward Wagner, who is the protagonist of three novels and about 20 short stories published between 1970 and 1985. Most Kane tales are sword and sorcery with strong elements of gothic horror and set in a grim, pre-medieval world which is nonetheless ancient and rich in history. In some of Wagner's later stories, Kane appears in the present day—for example, as a drug dealer in "Lacunae" and as a somewhat suspect publishing magnate in "At First Just Ghostly".

== Character background ==
Little is known about Kane's origins. In the story "Misericorde", he declares to one of his foes that his father's name was Adam, and his stepmother's name was Eve, possibly making him the biological son of the Biblical Adam's first wife Lilith. Like traditional depictions of Cain, he is a powerful, left-handed man with red hair, said to have killed (strangled) his brother Abel and been cursed by a mad god with an eternal life of wandering. Nevertheless, he is vulnerable to wounds, although they heal at a rapid pace, and it is said that he can be killed "by the violence that he himself created". Kane is portrayed as both an excellent warrior and an accomplished sorcerer who spends millennia wandering from one adventure to the next. Also, like the Biblical Cain, Kane is marked as a killer ("I kill things," he tells Elric in "The Gothic Touch". "It's what I was made to do. I'm rather good at it"); those who meet the gaze of his icy blue eyes cannot maintain contact for long, for they give away Kane's true nature as a butcher of men.

Kane is unconcerned with common morality, since no human relationship can ever last more than a small fraction of his lifetime (although the daughter he fathers in "Raven's Eyrie" appears as an adult in the modern-day "At First Just Ghostly"), and he frequently ends up on the wrong side in the conflicts, often to his own detriment. A common theme is the hero's weariness with his own immortality and his attempts to end meaning to his existence.

Kane and Conan the Barbarian, the warrior character created in the 1930s by American author Robert E. Howard, are both wandering warriors in quasi-feudal worlds. Kane, however, is a more devious character with a more somber and reflective outlook on life than Conan. Kane also has none of Conan's dislike of sorcery. His creator described Kane as "not a sword and sorcery hero; he is a gothic hero-villain from the tradition of the Gothic novels of the 18th and early 19th centuries" and as a character "who could master any situation intellectually, or rip heads off if push came to shove".

Some commentators argue that the fantasy protagonist that Kane has most in common with is Michael Moorcock's Elric of Melniboné, but Wagner was also inspired by novels such as Charles Maturin's Melmoth the Wanderer (1820) and E. R. Eddison's The Worm Ouroboros (1922).

== Works ==
=== Novels ===
- Bloodstone (1975): In the treasure captured during a savage raid, Kane discovers a powerful relic.
- Dark Crusade (1976): Kane encounters an ancient cult of evil, and its power-hungry leader.
- Darkness Weaves (1978) (editorially altered abridgement published in 1970 as "Darkness Weaves With Many Shades"): The mad sorceress Efrel seeks war and revenge upon her erstwhile husband, king Netisten Maril, and enlists Kane as her general in command of an army of mercenaries and monsters.

=== Story collections ===
- Death Angel's Shadow (1973)
  - "Reflections for the Winter of My Soul": Kane encounters a shapeshifting enemy who knows him (sequel to Dark Crusade).
  - "Cold Light": A knight forms a band of crusaders and mercenaries, in a quest to find and kill Kane.
  - "Mirage": Kane meets another immortal and discovers that death isn't the answer to his problems.
- Night Winds (1978)
  - "Undertow": A mistress of Kane seeks to escape from him with the aid of a young barbarian.
  - "Two Suns Setting": In a stony desert, Kane encounters the last of an elder race.
  - "The Dark Muse": Kane's poet friend takes inspiration from a journey into chaos.
  - "Raven's Eyrie": A previous victim of Kane plans to send his soul to hell.
  - "Lynortis Reprise": The survivors of a bloody siege meet a betrayer.
  - "Sing a Last Song of Valdese": A mutilated wizard takes his revenge.
- The Book of Kane (1985)
  - "Reflections for the Winter of My Soul"
  - "Sing a Last Song of Valdese"
  - "Raven's Eyrie"
  - "Misericorde": Kane enters the keep of the cruel Vareishei clan.
  - "The Other One": The gods are sometimes merciful, while Kane is less so.

=== Other tales ===
Kane also appears in "Lacunae", collected in Why Not You and I? (1987), and in "At First Just Ghostly", "Deep in the Depths of the Acme Warehouse", and "The Gothic Touch" (which features Michael Moorcock's Elric of Melniboné), collected in Exorcisms and Ecstasies (1997). This volume also includes the fragment "In the Wake of the Night" and an early version of "Lynortis Reprise".

=== Reprint collections ===
Night Shade Books reprinted the complete novels and stories in two volumes, as follows:

- Gods in Darkness: The Complete Novels of Kane (2002)
  - Bloodstone
  - Dark Crusade
  - Darkness Weaves
- Midnight Sun: The Complete Stories of Kane (2003)
  - "Death Angel's Shadow" (poem)
  - "Undertow"
  - "Two Suns Setting"
  - "The Dark Muse"
  - "Sing a Last Song of Valdese"
  - "Misericorde"
  - "Lynortis Reprise"
  - "Raven's Eyrie"
  - "Reflections for the Winter of My Soul"
  - "Cold Light"
  - "Mirage"
  - "The Other One"
  - "The Gothic Touch"
  - "Midnight Sun" (poem)
  - "Lacunae"
  - "Deep in the Depths of the Acme Warehouse"
  - "At First Just Ghostly"
  - "The Treasure of Lynortis" (early version of "Lynortis Reprise")
  - "In the Wake of the Night" (fragment of uncompleted fourth Kane novel)
  - "The Once and Future Kane" (non-fiction essay)

All of the Kane novels and both short story collections were reissued as a five volume limited edition set (each volume illustrated & signed by different artists, as well as unsigned) by Centipede Press in December 2015.
