= Hebrew Roots movement =

Biblical religious movement

The Hebrew Roots movement (HRM) is a Christian religious movement that advocates adherence to the Mosaic Law while also recognizing Jesus, usually referred to as Yeshua, as the Messiah. The movement stipulates that the Law of Moses was not abolished by Jesus and is, therefore, still in effect for his followers, both Jewish and Gentile. The movement advocates the keeping of the seventh-day Sabbath, biblical feasts, laws of cleanliness and circumcision.

Unlike Messianic Judaism, which often embraces the broader Jewish culture and usually features mainstream Protestant theology, followers of the Hebrew Roots Movement generally avoid adopting cultural practices associated with Jews and Judaism and instead focus on a literal interpretation of the Mosaic law and Hebrew Scripture. Followers of the movement do not recognize the Talmud and often reject more recent developments within Judaism like Hanukkah. As such, the way in which members of the Hebrew Roots Movement observe the Mosaic Law is often vastly different from traditional Rabbanite Jewish observance but may overlap Karaite Jewish observance. Most of the movement's followers reject the traditional Christian holidays like Christmas and Easter, which many regard as either extra-biblical or of pagan origin. Many within the Hebrew Roots movement also reject mainstream Christian doctrines such as the Trinity, with some viewing Jesus as a human prophet and others taking views similar to Arianism, Docetism or Nestorianism.

The Hebrew Roots Movement is not a monolithic movement with a central set of doctrines or formal organizational structure. The Hebrew Roots Movement is made up of various independent groups, congregations, and sects.

== History ==
The Hebrew Roots Movement's origins can be traced back to two earlier strains of Jewish-oriented Christianity.

The Sacred Name Movement began in the 1930s as a strain of Seventh-day Adventism which advocated for a return to the Mosaic Law in addition to standard Adventist theology. Around the same time, Adventist preacher Herbert W. Armstrong founded the Worldwide Church of God, which promoted Gentile Christian observance of the Mosaic Law as well as various forms of British Israelism and apocalyptic eschatology. Upon his death in the 1980s, his church splintered between those who wished to embrace mainstream Evangelical Christianity and those who wished to continue his Mosaic theology, with the latter forming their own break-off congregations and dispersing throughout the Midwest and Southern United States.

Although some within the movement maintain that their ideology is distinct from the theology associated with the Worldwide Church of God, most of the movement's early congregations were founded by those formerly associated with Herbert W. Armstrong following the splintering of his church after his death. Likewise, although there are certain theological differences between the Sacred Name Movement and the Hebrew Roots Movement, mainly stemming from debates over the Sacred Name Movement's more explicit Adventist theology, both movements developed side-by-side and often overlap significantly.

The Hebrew Roots movement began emerging as a distinct phenomenon in the late 1980s and 1990s.

Batya Wootten's curiosity about the Gentile majority in many Messianic Jewish congregations resulted in her first book about the two houses of Israel in 1988. This was later followed by her 1998 book entitled Who is Israel (now renamed in its 4th edition as Redeemed Israel).

In 1994, Dean and Susan Wheelock received their federal trademark for the term "Hebrew Roots", after which they began publishing the Hebrew Roots magazine in April/May 1998, and later a website at Hebrewroots.net.

In 1997, Dean Cozzens of Open Church Ministries based in Colorado Springs, Colorado, published "The Hebrew Movement", claiming that God had foreordained four major moves for the 20th century, Pentecostalism, faith healing, the Charismatic movement and finally the Hebrew Roots movement, the "final stage of empowerment" before Christ returns.

By the late 2000s, the movement had grown substantially alongside other forms of Messianic Judaism which are continuing to grow and become more mainstream.

== Beliefs ==
- The books of both the Old Testament and New Testaments are held as holy books. Mosaic law serves as the foundation to all subsequent understanding and interpretation of scripture. However, the movement generally rejects the Talmud and other Jewish exegesis on the Mosaic law. As such, the movement's interpretation and practice of the Mosaic law generally differs from Orthodox Judaism.
- The Mosaic Law and the teachings of the New Testament are to be obeyed by both Jews and Gentiles in the community of believers.
- Salvation derives from the belief in Jesus as personal savior. Observance of the Mosaic Law is understood to be an outward sign of salvation rather than the means through which salvation is earned.
- The movement's members observe various holidays, known as mo'adim or appointed times, listed in Leviticus 23, and also observe the 7th day Sabbath.
- Most congregations within the movement observe an annual memorial to the Last Supper, usually coinciding with Passover, rather than weekly communion.
- Hebrew Roots teachers emphasize the adoption of all Christians into the faith of Abraham, referred to in the Bible as the unified "House of Israel" (Leviticus 10:6), (Jeremiah 37:11), (Ezekiel 39:25), (Romans 11:13–26), (Ephesians 2:10–14).

=== Christology ===
While there is no unified Christology in the Hebrew Roots movement, many within the movement reject the Trinity, while also accepting the deity of Jesus. Others within the movement take a humanistic approach, believing Jesus to be a divinely-appointed prophet and Messiah of a completely human nature. Some groups hold to beliefs similar to Docetism, and Nestorianism.

Some within the movement endorse the doctrines of Arianism.

== Holidays and observances ==
One of the more identifiable elements of the Hebrew Roots Movement is its observance of Jewish Biblical holidays. Members of the movement often reject Christian holidays such as Christmas and Easter, which they regard as pagan. Members also generally reject Jewish holidays Hanukkah and Purim which are not mentioned in the Hebrew Scripture.

The particular manner of observance often differs significantly from the manner in which Judaism normally observes such holidays. Members of this movement also often use slightly different names for these holidays, often based on a literal translation of the Hebrew names given in the Hebrew Scripture.

Holidays are generally calculated based upon the observance of lunar months, with leap years added based upon various calculations such as the vernal equinox or the ripening of the barley crop within the land of Israel. As such, the calendar used by members of the Hebrew Roots Movement differs significantly from the standard Jewish calendar and followers often reject the Babylonian names for the months. Disputes over calendar issues and whether or not the barley crop in Israel is ripe enough have resulted in multiple fractures and schisms within the movement over the years.

Feast of Unleavened Bread (Passover) | Chag haMatzot (Chag haPesach)

Members of the movement celebrate the separate, but related, holidays of Passover and the Feast of Unleavened Bread. The Passover Memorial feast consists of a ceremonial meal, often combined with imagery of the Last Supper, and is similar to the Jewish Passover Seder. This memorial feast is followed by the week-long Feast of Unleavened Bread which is analogous to Jewish week-long holiday of Passover.

Passover usually marks the first month of the lunar year, in contrast to the standard Jewish calendar with starts with Rosh HaShanah.

Feast of Weeks (Pentecost) | Chag Shavuot

Following Passover, members of the movement count the omer leading up to the Feast of Weeks, which is analogous to the Jewish holiday of Shavuot. The method for counting the omer differs between different congregations and is significantly different from the manner in which Jews observe the counting of the omer. Debates over the process of counting the omer has led to multiple schisms within the movement.

Feast of Trumpets | Yom Teruah (Rosh HaShanah)

An autumnal observance marked with the blowing of the shofar and other festivities is known as the Feast of Trumpets.

Many within the movement reject the traditional Jewish identification of this holiday with Rosh HaShana, believing the Jewish holiday to be of pagan Babylonian origin and believe that the Jewish practice is a corruption dating to the time of the Babylonian exile.

Day of Atonement | Yom Kippur

The Day of Atonement celebration is celebrated in a manner similar to Judaism, albeit in a syncretic way which fuses Christian and Jewish theology.

Feast of Booths (Tabernacles) | Chag haSukkot (Sukkot)

Sukkot is a seven-day autumn harvest festival where believers are instructed to dwell in temporary dwellings (Lev 23). The Hebrew word Sukkot is usually translated as "tabernacles," or "booths" and is the plural form of sukka (sue’-kah)— a Hebrew word meaning tent or booth. This feast is also known by other names, such as, the Festival of Ingathering (Ex. 23:16), the Feast of the Nations, and the Season of Our Joy.

Eighth Day | Shemini Atzeret

The Hebrew word means "Eighth [day of] Assembly" and immediately follows the Feast of Sukkot. Hebrew Roots adherents view this day in a different light than those in the Jewish faith in which the day is “characterized as a day when the Jewish people "tarries" to spend an additional day with God at the end of Sukkot”.

Messianics and some in Hebrew Roots combine this appointment with the Feast of Sukkot and, therefore, do not recognize it as the special day that it is made to be.

== Criticism ==
The movement has faced theological criticism, primarily from other Christians but also from Jews who claim that the movement misunderstands and misrepresents fundamental aspects of Judaism. It has also faced secular criticism from historians who consider the movement to be anachronistic and historically inaccurate as well as from secular Jews who have claimed that the Hebrew Roots movement, similar to the Messianic movement, is a form of cultural appropriation.

The movement's emphasis on Hebrew culture and identity has resulted in criticism by some historians. Second Temple Judaism and the culture of Roman Judaea during the time of Jesus was a syncretic mixture of Greek-speaking Hellenized Jews, Aramaic speaking peasantry influenced by Persian culture and Gentiles practicing Roman paganism. Modern Judaism and Jewish culture developed primarily in the diaspora after the destruction of the Second Temple and subsequent dispersal of Jews throughout the Roman empire.

Aramaic replaced Hebrew as the primary spoken language of the Jews following their return to Israel from the Babylonian exile. Likewise, the Greek and Persian languages also existed as lingua francas, representing the two dominant world powers in the region just prior to the arrival of Christianity. The predominant view of modern scholarship is that Jesus spoke Aramaic.

The Hebrew Roots movement contradicts the general Christian belief that when Jesus died, he fulfilled (and thereby rendered obsolete) the Mosaic Law. Many Christians also argue that the Mosaic Law was only meant for the Jews, meaning that Gentiles are exempt from obedience to the Law of Moses. This is also the position of modern Judaism, which only promotes the Seven Laws of Noah to the Gentiles and does not seek converts.

A critic of the Hebrew Roots Movement is R. L. Solberg, who has published a book called Torahism: Are Christians Required to Keep the Law of Moses. Torah-observant Christian scholar David Wilber has responded to Solberg's criticisms.

== See also ==
- Messianic Judaism
- Sacred Name movement
- Christian views on the Old Covenant
- Pronomianism
- Early Christianity
- Ebionites
- Judaizers
- Nazarene (sect)
- New Perspective on Paul
- New religious movement
- Paleo-orthodoxy
- Restorationism
- British Israelism
- Black Hebrew Israelites
