= Charlotte Christian College and Theological Seminary =

College in North Carolina, U.S.

- Other name: CCCTS
- Former name: New Life Theological Seminary
- Motto: Christ ... through the cities to the world!
- Type: Private college and seminary
- Established: 1996
- Religious affiliation: Non-denominational Christian
- President: Eddie G. Grigg
- Faculty: 10+
- Administrative staff: 10+
- Students: 191 (2020-2021)
- Location: Charlotte, North Carolina, U.S. 35.2428°N 80.8025°W
- Campus: Urban
- Website: www.charlottechristian.edu

Charlotte Christian College and Theological Seminary (formerly New Life Theological Seminary) is a private evangelical Christian college and seminary in Charlotte, North Carolina. It was established in 1996 by Eddie G. Grigg, a pastor, educator, and theologian. The institution was approved as a degree-granting institution in 1997, granted candidate for accreditation in 2003, and accredited in 2008.

== History ==
In 1997, the school began offering courses on the campus of New Life Baptist Church in northeast Charlotte, NC. At the time, Dr. Eddie G. Grigg was the senior pastor of this congregation. The school became New Life Theological Seminary in April 1999 and began seeking recognized accreditation. The institution received TRACS accreditation in 2003, complemented by its move to a campus near the heart of Charlotte. Whiting Avenue Baptist Church graciously donated their 37,000-square-foot (3,400 m^{2}) facility on 2.5 acres (10,000 m^{2}) of land near Uptown Charlotte in 2002. In 2003, the institution began offering classes in the NoDa neighborhood. The facility was renovated in 2007 to meet ADA standards, house administrative offices and classrooms, and provide wireless Internet access throughout the building. In 2014 an addition of a study mezzanine was constructed and along with additional ADA upgrades.

New Life Theological Seminary received Reaffirmation I in April 2013 for another 10-year period. Encouraged by the progress of the institution, the Board of Directors, working with key institutional leadership, developed an aggressive plan for growth of the institution. The board officially approved the plan during its regular session February 23, 2014. This plan included a name change to become Charlotte Christian College and Theological Seminary. April 4, 2014, the North Carolina Secretary of State approved the name change, followed by the Transnational Association of Christian Colleges and Schools on June 26, 2014. The institution did not go public with the name change until Fall Convocation, August 26, 2014. During the convocation, President Grigg laid out the vision for the next phase of development and growth and shared that the institution "must be more than just a seminary if we are to impact our cities for Christ."

In 2019, the board of directors sold the Whiting Avenue campus and relocated to 7520 E. Independence Blvd., Charlotte, NC, 28227. About the same time, the institution experienced a significant growth in enrollment. These recent events have better established the college and seminary and prepared it for a promising future.

== Academics ==
Charlotte Christian College and Theological Seminary is accredited by the Transnational Association of Christian Colleges and Schools. It offers the Associate of Arts (A.A.), Bachelor of Arts (B.A.), Master of Arts (M.A.), Master of Divinity (M.Div.), and Doctor of Ministry (D.Min.) degrees. Charlotte Theological Seminary has an Associate Member status with the Association of Theological Schools (ATS). Major areas of study include Biblical/Theological Studies, Pastoral Ministry, and Urban Christian Ministry.

== Library ==
The library was officially named the Daniel and Madeline Goldberg Library in 2018. The Goldberg Library houses 27,000 volumes, 60 periodical subscriptions, and subscribes to the ATLA database. The collections' strengths are in pastoral ministry and urban ministries, drawing from scholarship in urban sociology, urban anthropology, and urban theology. The library is a member of Carolinas Theological Library Consortium, a regional consortium of the American Theological Library Association (ATLA).
