= Nictzin Dyalhis =

American novelist

- Born: June 4, 1873; Massachusetts
- Died: May 8, 1942 (aged 68); Salisbury, Maryland
- Occupations: Short story writer, chemist
- Writing career
- Genres: Fantasy, science fiction

Nictzin Wilstone Dyalhis (June 4, 1873 – May 8, 1942) was an American chemist and short story writer who specialized in the genres of science fiction and fantasy. He wrote as Nictzin Dyalhis. During his lifetime he attained a measure of celebrity as a writer for the pulp fiction magazine Weird Tales.

== Life ==
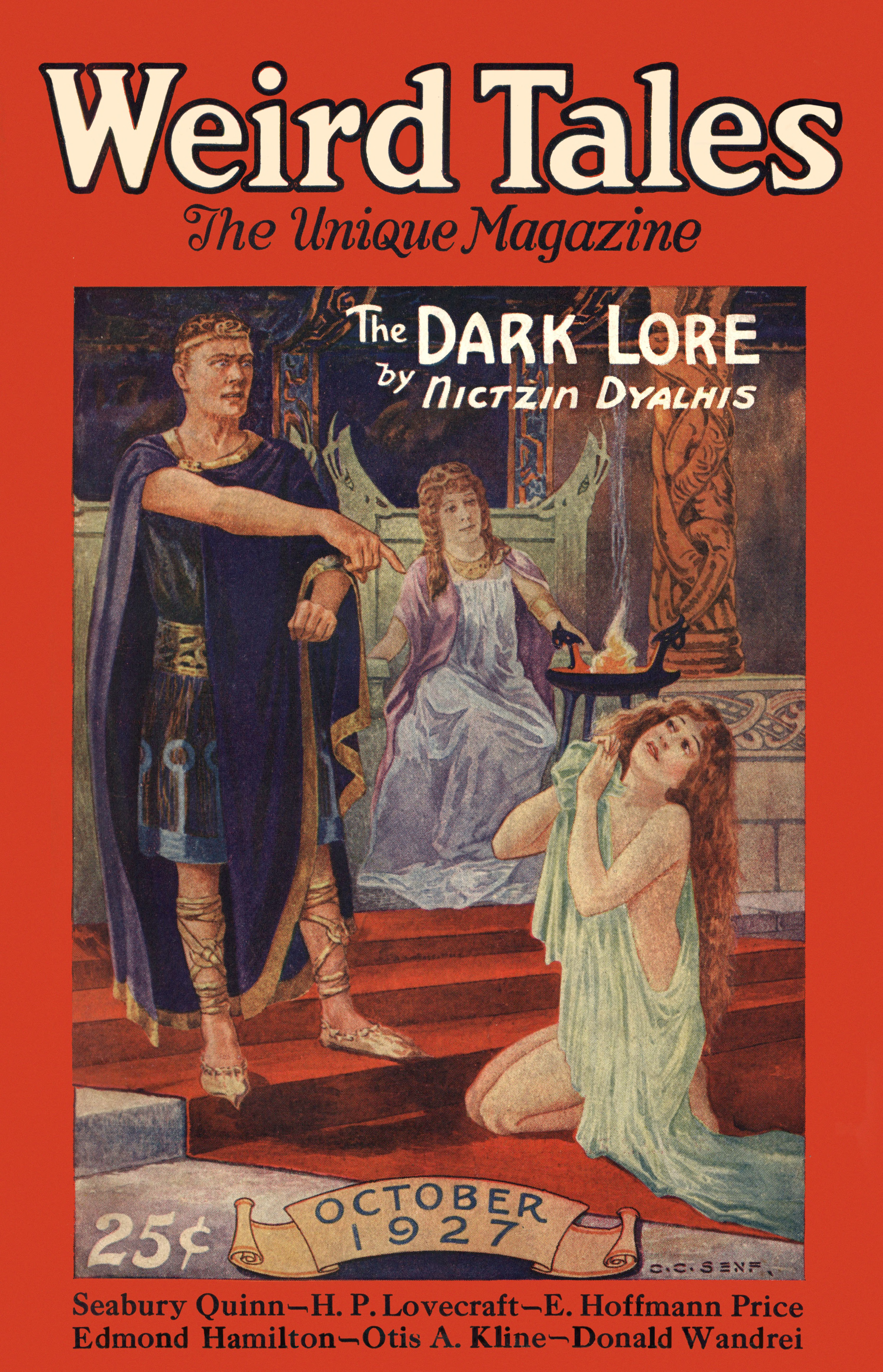
Dyalhis's novelette "The Dark Lore" was the cover story in the October 1927 Weird Tales

Firm facts about Dyalhis's life are few, as he coupled his limited output of fiction with a penchant for personal privacy, an avoidance of publicity, and intentional deception. Even his name is uncertain. His World War I draft registration card establishes his full name as Nictzin Wilstone Dyalhis, but it marks the earliest known appearance of this name. His first wife's death certificate gives his first name as "Fred", and he has been thought to have possibly altered his surname to Dyalhis from a more prosaic "Dallas"—in his stories, Dyalhis played with common spellings, so that "Earth" becomes Aerth and "Venus", Venhez. According to L. Sprague de Camp, however, Dyalhis was his actual surname, inherited from his Welsh father, and his given name Nictzin was also authentic, bestowed on him due to his father's fascination with the Aztecs.

His World War I draft registration card and 1920 Census record establish his birthdate as June 4, 1873, and his state of birth as Massachusetts. According to the 1920 census, his father was also born in Massachusetts, and his mother in Guatemala. But in the 1930 census he was reported to have been born about 1880 in Arizona to parents also born in that state. In bibliographic sources, his year of birth was usually cited (with a question mark) as 1879; Dziemianowicz gives it as 1880; and he was speculated to have been born in England—or Pima, Arizona.

Among the imaginative readers of his stories, Dyalhis acquired a reputation for possessing unusual abilities and an exotic history as an adventurer and world traveler. The known facts of his life are more prosaic, mostly centering around Pennsylvania and Maryland. At some time during his youth he lost one eye, as noted on his draft card. He worked as a box nailer in 1918, a chemist in 1920, a machinist in 1930, and a writer for magazines in 1940.

About 1912 he married Harriet Weber Lord, daughter of Samuel and Fidelia A. (Phillips) Lord of Sugar Grove, Warren County, in northwestern Pennsylvania. In 1918 and 1920 the couple was living in Sugar Grove, in the latter year with Harriet's widowed mother. Harriet was committed to the Warren State Hospital there about 1928, where she spent the remainder of her life. Nictzin moved on, though she was likely unaware of it; in 1930 and 1940 the census shows her as still married, and on her death certificate she is listed as a widow.

Nonetheless, Nictzin evidently remarried. The 1930 census shows him near the southern border of Pennsylvania, living as a wedded couple with one Netulyani Dyahlis in Waynesboro. Her actual name was Mary G. Sheddy. They had a daughter, Mary Agnes Dyalhis, born in Waynesboro in 1932. In the 1930 and 1940 censuses, his May 1939 Social Security application, and 1942 draft registration Nictzin consistently misrepresents his birthdate as June 4, 1880 and his birthplace as Pima, Arizona; Mary/Netulyani also made a fraudulent Social Security application in September, 1938. The Dyalhises were living in Fruitland, Maryland in 1940 and 1942; Nictzin died in nearby Salisbury on May 8, 1942. His first wife Harriet died at age 84 in the Warren State Hospital on August 20, 1959, and his second wife Mary died in April, 1977. Their daughter Mary Posavec died in 2009.

== Literary career ==
Dyalhis's earliest stories, including "When the Green Star Waned" and its sequel "The Oath of Hul Jok", are fairly firmly in the science fiction genre; the former is the source of the earliest known example of the term "blaster" in reference to a ray gun. Yet his overall output is most easily and readily categorized as occult fantasy, involving spiritual travel on the astral plane, journeys to Hell, and reincarnation.

In "The Eternal Conflict" (1925) and "The Dark Lore"(1927) adventurers in the astral plane encounter the traditional Judaeo-Christian Hell. "The Red Witch" (1932), "The Sapphire Goddess" (1934; variant title "The Sapphire Siren"), "The Sea-Witch" (1937) and "The Heart of Atlantan"(1940) all feature souls that transmigrate across time or undergo reincarnation to enact conflicts from the past. Dyalhis' last four stories have been described as "sword and sorcery", since they feature heroes battling against malevolent supernatural forces.

In a field of popular literature characterized by prolific production, Dyalhis gained a kind of reverse fame by the extreme paucity of his output: he published only eight stories in Weird Tales over a fifteen-year period. Several additional stories appeared in Adventure and Ghost Stories magazine, and gangster fiction pulps. In the verdict of one SF commentator, Dyalhis "established a reputation in Weird Tales out of proportion to either the quality or quantity of his contributions." Yet his stories were very popular with readers, and a few, notably "The Sapphire Goddess," have been featured in anthologies.

Nine of Dyalhis's stories were included in the collection The Sapphire Goddess, published in 2018, the first time his work appears to have been collected in print. The collection leaves out the two stories from Adventure and the two from Underworld.

== Bibliography ==
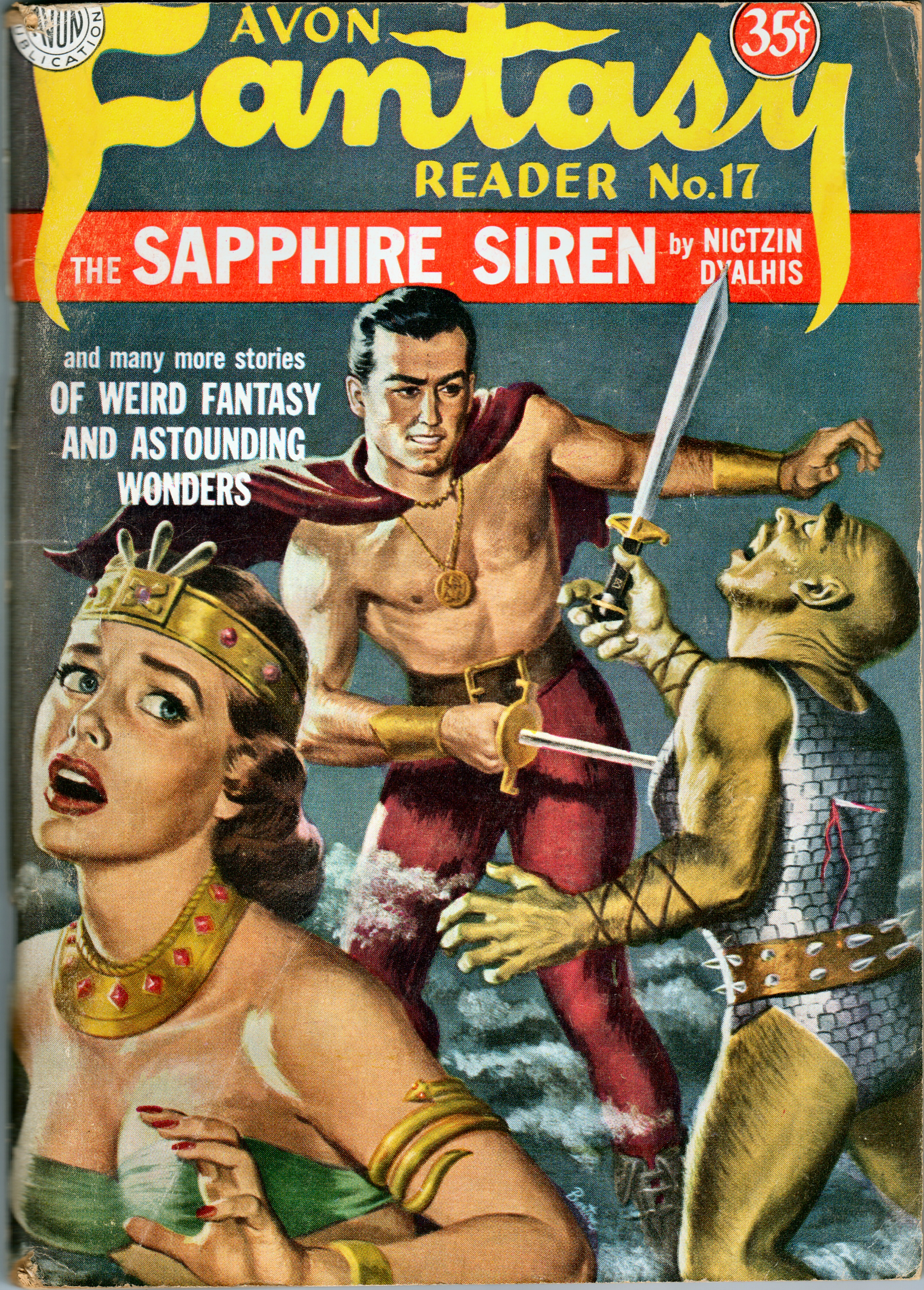
Cover of the fantasy fiction magazine Avon Fantasy Reader no. 17 (1951) featuring "The Sapphire Siren" by Nictzin Dyalhis.

=== Collections ===
- The Sapphire Goddess: The Fantasies of Nictzin Dyalhis. DMR Books, Chicago, Illinois. 2018, ISBN 978-0-9909900-5-5

=== Short stories ===
- "Who Keep the Desert Law" (Adventure, October 20, 1922)
- "For Wounding—Retaliation" (Adventure, November 20, 1922; reprinted in Wildside Press reprint of Tales of Magic and Mystery, 2004)
- "When the Green Star Waned" (Weird Tales, April 1925; reprinted January 1929)
- "The Eternal Conflict" (Weird Tales, October 1925)
- "He Refused to Stay Dead" (Ghost Stories, April 1927. Reprinted in Ghost Stories:The Magazine and its Makers: Volume 2, 2010, edited by John Locke)
- "The Dark Lore" (Weird Tales, October 1927)
- "The Oath of Hul Jok" (Weird Tales, September 1928)
- "The Red Witch" (Weird Tales, April 1932)
- "The Whirling Machete" (Underworld Magazine, December 1933)
- "The Sapphire Goddess" AKA "The Sapphire Siren" (Weird Tales, February 1934)
- "Gangland’s Judas" (Complete Underworld Novelettes, August 1934)
- "The Sea-Witch" (Weird Tales, December 1937; reprinted July 1953)
- "Heart of Atlantan" (Weird Tales, September 1940; reprinted in The Magic of Atlantis, 1970)

== Sources ==
- Steve Reilly. "Nictzin Dyalhis." Posting on the Bear Alley Blogspot, October 17, 2011.
- Jaffery, Sheldon, and Fred Cook. The Collector's Index to Weird Tales. Bowling Green, OH, Bowling Green State University Popular Press, 1985.
- Moskowitz, Sam. "Nictzin Dyalhis: Mysterious Master of Fantasy." In Echoes of Valor III, edited by Karl Edward Wagner, Tor, 1991.
