= Benjamin Szumskyj =

Australian editor and teacher

Benjamin J. S. Szumskyj is an Australian who used to be an editor, author and critic of weird fiction, horror and fantasy literature. Since becoming a Christian, he has written non-fiction regarding Christianity and remains a teacher.

== Literary work ==
Between 2003 and 2008 he edited several books on authors such as Robert E. Howard, Karl Edward Wagner, Fritz Leiber, Robert Bloch and William Peter Blatty and wrote dozens of essays and articles on literary criticism for several magazines and journals such as Notes in Contemporary Literature, Wormwood: Writings about Fantasy, Supernatural and Decadent Literature and Star*Line: Journal of the Science Fiction Poetry Association. He was also general editor of the journal Studies in Fantasy Literature and editor-in-chief of the journal Studies in Australian Weird Fiction, before the former was cancelled because the publisher shut down and the latter was handed over to poet and critic Phillip A. Ellis. He was also the editor of Sword and Sorcery & Weird Fiction Terminus (SSWFT) amateur press association from its inception in March 2001 until December 2008. SSWFT has members in Australia, US, UK, Finland and Sweden (the a.p.a.'s editor is now Scott Sheaffer.)

== Christian commitments ==
In 2008 Szumskyj left the field of literary criticism to devote his life to his Christian commitments (as noted in Within the Shadow of the Cross, SSWFT #37), renouncing his former works as inconsistent with his faith. The change was so significant, it resulted in him writing The Pilgrim’s Digress: Why Christians Should Avoid the Fantasy and Horror Genres (Ichthus Publications, 2015). As he wrote in the conclusion of the book, "I regret very, very much what I edited and wrote during my almost ten years in the field of literary criticism. Without sounding melodramatic, it spiritually sickens me, and if I could, I would destroy ever last copy of what I wrote and contributed to and expunge every title bearing my name or contribution from the Internet, along with the memories indelibly etched on the minds of my readers. I abhor it all. That is why I can sympathize with the Apostle Paul’s line in Philippians 3:8... I agree with him [here] and feel the same about what I formerly read and wrote. Dung. The same can be said of what I watched. If to gain Christ is to lose the world’s literature (and non-fiction), then so be it. I would rather read through the lens of Christ" ("Conclusion: It's All About Philippians 3:8", p. 90-91). The book was revised and republished as Fantasy, Horror, and the Truth: A Christian Insider's Story (Aneko Press, 2020).

When not working, he focuses all his time and energy on theological studies and has begun to write articles for Christian publications online and in-print such as Got Questions Ministries, Creation Ministries International, Bible League Quarterly, Evangelical Action, and several others. In addition to Fantasy, Horror, and the Truth: A Christian Insider's Story, he is the author of Love and the Law: A Pronomian Pocket Guide to John 14:15 (Pronomian Publishing, 2025) and Souls Knit Together: Thirty-One Lessons On Friendship From David And Jonathan (Pronomian Publishing, 2024).
