= Evenor (collection) =

- Cover, front, of Evenor.
- Author: George MacDonald
- Cover artist: Gervasio Gallardo
- Language: English
- Series: Ballantine Adult Fantasy series
- Genre: Fantasy short stories
- Publisher: Ballantine Books
- Publication date: 1972
- Publication place: United States
- Media type: Print (paperback)
- Pages: xiv, 210 pp
- Preceded by: Phantastes

Evenor is a collection of fantasy novelettes by Scottish author George MacDonald (1824 - 1905), edited by Lin Carter. It was first published in paperback format by Ballantine Books as the fifty-third volume of its Ballantine Adult Fantasy series in November 1972. It was the series' third and last MacDonald volume and the only collection of his shorter fantasies assembled by Carter.

The book collects three short pieces by the author originally published during the 1860s and 1870s, with a general introduction and introductory notes to each story by Carter.

== Contents ==
- "Introduction: The Dubious Land" (Lin Carter)
- "The Wise Woman" (1875)
- "The Carasoyn" (1871)
- "The Golden Key" (1867)
