= Merlin's Ring =

1974 novel by H. Warner Munn

- Cover of first edition
- Author: H. Warner Munn
- Cover artist: Gervasio Gallardo
- Language: English
- Series: Merlin's Godson
- Genre: Fantasy
- Publisher: Ballantine Books
- Publication date: June 1974
- Publication place: United States
- Media type: Print (Paperback)
- Pages: 366
- ISBN: 0-345-24010-3
- OCLC: 901109
- Dewey Decimal: 813/.5/4
- LC Class: PZ3.M9262 Me PS3525.U52
- Preceded by: The Ship From Atlantis
- Followed by: none

Merlin's Ring is a fantasy novel by American writer H. Warner Munn, the third in a series of three based on Arthurian legend. Originally intended for publication by Ballantine Books in the Ballantine Adult Fantasy series, it actually saw print only after the series was discontinued. It was first published in paperback by Ballantine Books in June 1974. It was reprinted by Ballantine twice, in September 1975 and August 1981, before going out of print. In December 2005 a trade paperback edition was issued by Cold Spring Press. The novel was nominated for the 1975 Mythopoeic Fantasy Award and World Fantasy Award for Best Novel.

== Plot summary ==
The novel is a continuation of the story in The Ship From Atlantis, telling of Prince Gwalchmai's star-crossed love for Princess Corenice of Atlantis in her various reincarnations, along with his centuries-delayed quest to secure aid and settlers to shore up the faltering empire established by his father and refugees from the fallen kingdom of Arthur in the New World. The story opens with Gwalchmai's reawakening after centuries in suspended animation. The Britain he finally reaches is a prostrated land transformed into England by its Saxon conquerors, with his father's exile long forgotten and his countrymen incapable of undertaking any sort of colonization project. Guided by his reincarnated lover, he seeks aid unsuccessfully, his travels taking him from Viking-age Europe to the far-eastern empires of the Chinese and Japanese, and ultimately back to Europe again as it approaches the Renaissance. He is abetted down through the centuries by the magical ring of his godfather Merlin, responsible for his longevity, and by Corenice. Highlights include the hero's visit to Faerie, his service as a companion to Joan of Arc, and his final revelation in Iceland of the secret of the New World to a Genoan merchant, Christopher Columbus.

== Related works ==
The preceding books in the series, King of the World's Edge (1939) and The Ship from Atlantis (1967) were later reissued together by Ballantine as Merlin's Godson (1976), a title that has also been used for the series as a whole. Munn's research on Joan of Arc for Merlin's Ring sparked an interest that carried over into his epic poem The Banner of Joan (1975). In his last years Munn was reportedly working on a sequel to Merlin's Ring to be called The Sword of Merlin, which he did not live to finish.

== Notes ==
Preceded by The Ship From Atlantis	Merlin's Godson; Merlin's Ring	Succeeded by none
