= The House of Lost Identity =

1927 collection of short stories by Donald Corley

- Cover of the first edition
- Author: Donald Corley
- Language: English
- Genre: Short story collection
- Publisher: Robert M. McBride
- Publication date: 1927
- Publication place: United States
- Media type: Print (hardback)
- Pages: 325 pp.
- Followed by: The Fifth Son of the Shoemaker

The House of Lost Identity is a collection of short stories by Donald Corley, illustrated by the author. Corley did not limit himself to one genre, but the primary distinction of the collection is its inclusion of a number of classic dark fantasies. It was first published in hardcover in New York by Robert M. McBride in May 1927, and had a number of reprintings; printings after the first include an introduction by James Branch Cabell. It was reissued in hardcover by Books for Libraries in 1971, and in hardcover and paperback by Wildside Press in February 2008. The first British edition was published by George G. Harrap and Co. in 1927. The book's importance in the history of fantasy literature was also recognized by the anthologization of two of its tales by Lin Carter in the 1970s; "The Song of the Tombelaine," in Discoveries in Fantasy (1972), for the celebrated Ballantine Adult Fantasy Series, and "Figs" (under the alternate title of "The Book of Lullûme") in Realms of Wizardry (1976).

The collection was named after its initial story, "The House of Lost Identity".

== Contents ==
- "The House of Lost Identity"
- "The Price of Reflection"
- "The Daimyō's Bowl"
- "Figs"
- "The Manacles of Youth"
- "The Ghost-Wedding"
- "The Glass Eye of Throgmorton"
- "The Legend of the Little Horses"
- "The Tale That the Ming Bell Told"
- "The Book of the Debts"
- "The Song of the Tombelaine"

== Reception ==
Lin Carter describes Corley's style as possessing a quality of "gorgeousness", which he characterizes as having "the sort of verbal richness that bejewels the pages of Clark Ashton Smith's work or the Arabian Nights ... lazy and singing, [with] a certain playfulness to it".
