= Great Short Novels of Adult Fantasy Volume II =

1973 anthology edited by Lin Carter

- Cover of the first edition.
- Editor: Lin Carter
- Cover artist: Gervasio Gallardo
- Language: English
- Series: Ballantine Adult Fantasy series
- Genre: Fantasy
- Publisher: Ballantine Books
- Publication date: 1973
- Publication place: United States
- Media type: Print (paperback)
- Pages: viii, 248
- Preceded by: Great Short Novels of Adult Fantasy I
- Followed by: Kingdoms of Sorcery

Great Short Novels of Adult Fantasy Volume II is an anthology of fantasy novellas, edited by American writer Lin Carter. It was first published in paperback by Ballantine Books in March, 1973 as the fifty-sixth volume of its Ballantine Adult Fantasy series. It was the ninth such anthology assembled by Carter for the series.

== Summary ==
The book collects four novellas by as many fantasy authors, with an overall introduction and notes by Carter. It is a companion volume to Carter's earlier Great Short Novels of Adult Fantasy I (1972).

== Contents ==
- "Introduction" (Lin Carter)
- "The Woman in the Mirror" (George Macdonald, Phantastes)
- "The Repairer of Reputations" (Robert W. Chambers, The King in Yellow)
- "The Transmutation of Ling" (Ernest Bramah, The Wallet of Kai Lung)
- "The Lavender Dragon" (Eden Phillpotts, The Lavender Dragon)

== Reception ==
Theodore Sturgeon reported the stories "run from great to quaint."

The book was also reviewed by Everett F. Bleiler in The Guide to Supernatural Fiction, 1983.
