= The Haunted Jester =

- Cover of the first edition
- Author: Donald Corley
- Cover artist: Donald Corley
- Language: English
- Genre: Short story collection
- Publisher: Robert M. McBride
- Publication date: 1931
- Publication place: United States
- Media type: Print (hardback)
- Pages: 306 pp.
- Preceded by: The Fifth Son of the Shoemaker

The Haunted Jester is a collection of short stories by Donald Corley, illustrated by the author. Corley did not limit himself to one genre, but the primary distinction of the collection is its inclusion of a number of classic dark fantasies . It was first published in hardcover in New York by Robert M. McBride in September 1931. It was later reissued by Books for Libraries in 1970. One story from the collection, "The Bird with the Golden Beak", was included by Lin Carter in Discoveries in Fantasy (1972), for the Ballantine Adult Fantasy Series.

== Contents ==
- "Seven Knights in Silver"
- "The God from the Shelf"
- "The Dance of the Drowned"
- "The Red Lacquer Box of Nirr-lo-fan"
- "The Bride's Feast"
- "The Lama, the Lady, and the Topaz"
- "The Road to Benachie"
- "The Troubled Promises of Kings"
- "The Eyes of Compassion"
- "Que le Diable!"
- "The Daughter of the Moon"
- "Droit de Seigneur"
- "Fifteen Annas in the Rupee"
- "The Bird with the Golden Beak"

== Reception ==
The New York Times praised the collection, saying "when Mr. Corley writes lacquer legends of things far away and long ago, he assumes the mantle of all romancers since the telling of 'Arabian Nights'. . . . Life may be seldom so noble, so wistful or so colorful, but these stories, for all their artifice, give spur to the imagination."

Lin Carter describes Corley's style as possessing a quality of "gorgeousness", which he characterizes as having "the sort of verbal richness that bejewels the pages of Clark Ashton Smith's work or the Arabian Nights ... lazy and singing, [with] a certain playfulness to it ..."
