= Transit =

Transit may refer to:

== Arts and entertainment ==
=== Film ===
- Transit (1980 film), a 1980 Israeli film
- Transit (1986 film), a Canadian short film
- Transit (2005 film), a film produced by MTV and Staying-Alive about four people in countries in the world
- Transit (2006 film), a 2006 film about Russian and American pilots in World War II
- Transit (2012 film), an American thriller
- Transit (2013 film), a Filipino independent film
- Transit (2018 film), a German film

=== Literature ===
- Transit (Cooper novel), a 1964 science fiction by Edmund Cooper
- Transit (Seghers novel), a 1944 novel by Anna Seghers
- Transit (Aaronovitch novel), a 1992 novel by Ben Aaronovitch based on the TV series Doctor Who

=== Music ===
- Transit (band), an American emo band from Boston, Massachusetts
- Transit (Ira Stein and Russel Walder album), an album by acoustic duo Ira Stein and Russel Walder, released 1986
- Transit (Sponge Cola album)
- Transit (A. J. Croce album)
- Transit Transit, an album by the band Autolux
- Transit (rapper), real name Dan Bennett, Canadian indie hip-hop artist

== Science and technology ==
=== Computing ===
- Internet transit, one of two mechanisms by which Internet traffic is exchanged between internet service providers

=== Astronomy, navigation, and surveying ===
- Transit (astronomy), the apparent motion of one celestial body across the face of another celestial body or meridian
- Transit instrument, a special-purpose telescope mounted so as to point only at objects transiting the local meridian
- A specialized type of theodolite used in surveying
- Transit (satellite), the first satellite navigation system to be used operationally
- Navigational transit, when a navigator observes two fixed reference points in line

== Transportation ==
- Transit (app), a mobile application for public transportation trip planning
- Transit bus, a type of bus used on shorter-distance public transport bus services
- Public transport systems, sometimes called 'mass transit', 'public transit', or simply 'transit', in which passengers are carried in large numbers using shared vehicles.
- Ford Transit, a Ford Motor Company van
- Transit (ship), the name given to the three sailing vessels designed and built for Captain Richard Hall Gower
- Transit (Frederick County), a bus service in Frederick County, Maryland
- Transit passage

== Other uses ==
- Transit, Canadian shoe retailer now operating under the name Spring
- Transit hotel

== See also ==
- Transat (disambiguation)
- Transition (disambiguation)
- Sic transit gloria mundi
- Transport or transportation
