= Great Short Novels of Adult Fantasy I =

1972 anthology edited by Lin Carter

- Cover of the first edition.
- Editor: Lin Carter
- Cover artist: Gervasio Gallardo
- Language: English
- Series: Ballantine Adult Fantasy series
- Genre: Fantasy
- Publisher: Ballantine Books
- Publication date: 1972
- Publication place: United States
- Media type: Print (paperback)
- Preceded by: Discoveries in Fantasy
- Followed by: Great Short Novels of Adult Fantasy Volume II

Great Short Novels of Adult Fantasy I is an anthology of fantasy novellas, edited by American writer Lin Carter. It was first published in paperback by Ballantine Books in September, 1972 as the fifty-second volume of its Ballantine Adult Fantasy series. It was the eighth such anthology assembled by Carter for the series.

== Summary ==
The book collects four novellas by five fantasy authors, with an overall introduction and notes by Carter. It is a companion volume to Carter's subsequent collection Great Short Novels of Adult Fantasy Volume II (1973).

== Contents ==
- "Introduction" (Lin Carter)
- "The Wall of Serpents" (Fletcher Pratt and L. Sprague de Camp)
- "The Kingdom of the Dwarfs" (Anatole France)
- "The Maker of Moons" (Robert W. Chambers)
- "The Hollow Land" (William Morris)

== Reception ==
The book was reviewed by Everett F. Bleiler in The Guide to Supernatural Fiction, 1983.
