= Kingdoms of Sorcery =

1976 anthology edited by Lin Carter

Kingdoms of Sorcery: An Anthology of Adult Fantasy
- Dust cover of the first edition.
- Editor: Lin Carter
- Cover artist: John Cayea
- Language: English
- Genre: Fantasy
- Publisher: Doubleday
- Publication date: 1976
- Publication place: United States
- Media type: Print (hardcover)
- Pages: xv, 218
- ISBN: 0-385-09975-4
- OCLC: 1733365
- LC Class: PZ1 .K5824 PR1309.F3
- Preceded by: Great Short Novels of Adult Fantasy Volume II
- Followed by: Realms of Wizardry

Kingdoms of Sorcery: An Anthology of Adult Fantasy is an anthology of fantasy stories, edited by American writer Lin Carter. It was first published in hardcover by Doubleday in January 1976 as the first of two such anthologies continuing a series of nine assembled by Carter for the Ballantine Adult Fantasy series.

== Summary ==
The book collects sixteen tales and excerpts from novels from five varieties of fantasy writing, with an overall introduction and notes on the individual authors by Carter. The collection is a companion volume to Carter's later anthology Realms of Wizardry (1976).

== Contents ==
- "Magic Casements: An Introduction" (Lin Carter)
- I. The Forerunners of Modern Fantasy

- "The History of Babouc the Scythian" (Voltaire)
- "The Palace of Subterranean Fire" - from Vathek (William Beckford)
- "The Witch Woman" - from Lilith (George Macdonald)

- II. Fantasy as Saga

- "The Folk of the Mountain Door" (William Morris)
- "A Night-Piece on Ambremerine" - from Mistress of Mistresses (E. R. Eddison)
- "Dr. Meliboë the Enchanter" - from The Well of the Unicorn (Fletcher Pratt)
- "The Two Best Thieves in Lankhmar" - from Swords Against Wizardry (Fritz Leiber)

- III. Fantasy as Parable

- "Shadow and Silence" (Edgar Allan Poe)
- "Fables from the Edge of Night" (Clark Ashton Smith)
- "The Tomb of the God" (Robert H. Barlow)

- IV. Fantasy as Anecdote

- "Merlyn Vs. Madame Mim" - from The Sword in the Stone (T. H. White)
- "The Owl and the Ape" (L. Sprague de Camp)
- "The Twelve Wizards of Ong" (Lin Carter)

- V. Fantasy as Epic

- "Deep Magic from the Dawn of Time" - from The Lion, the Witch and the Wardrobe (C. S. Lewis)
- "The Bridge of Khazad-Dûm" - from The Fellowship of the Ring (J. R. R. Tolkien)
- "The Story of the Blessing of El-Ahrairah" - from Watership Down (Richard Adams)

- "More Magic Casements. Suggestions for Further Reading" (Lin Carter)
