= Anodos =

Anodos (Ancient Greek: ἄνοδος) is a term meaning either 'ascent, way up' (from Ancient Greek ἀνά 'upwards, up' and ὁδός 'the way') or 'pathless, having no road, impassable' (from Ancient Greek ἀν- 'not' and ὁδός 'way, path, road, journey'). It may refer to:

- Divine illumination, as used by Plato
- The central character in George MacDonald's fantasy novel Phantastes (1858)
- Pseudonym used by the poet Mary Elizabeth Coleridge
- The third phase ('ascent') of the cycle of Persephone's annual visit to Hades as imagined in the mythology and rites of the Eleusinian Mysteries
- The creation of Pandora, the first woman in Greek mythology
