= Over the Hill =

Over the Hill may refer to:

== Film and television ==
- Over the Hill (1917 film), an American silent drama film
- Over the Hill to the Poorhouse or Over the Hill, a 1920 American silent film
- Over the Hill (1931 film), an American drama film
- Over the Hill (1992 film), an Australian film
- Over the Hill (TV series), a 1994–1995 Australian television series on the Seven Network
- “Over the Hill”, an episode of the 20th series of the UK/US children’s tv series Thomas & Friends

== Other uses ==
- Over the Hills, a 2007 album by Lucy Kaplansky
- "Over the Hill", a 1973 song by John Martyn from Solid Air
- "Over the hill", the route over the Patchen Pass between Santa Cruz and the Santa Clara Valley, California
- "Over the Hill", a residential area south of Nassau, Bahamas

== See also ==
- Over the Hills and Far Away (disambiguation)
