= The Spawn of Cthulhu =

1971 anthology of fantasy short stories edited by Lin Carter

- Cover of the first edition.
- Editor: Lin Carter
- Cover artist: Gervasio Gallardo
- Language: English
- Series: Ballantine Adult Fantasy series
- Genre: Fantasy
- Publisher: Ballantine Books
- Publication date: 1971
- Publication place: United States
- Media type: Print (paperback)
- ISBN: 0-345-02394-3
- OCLC: 398491
- Preceded by: New Worlds for Old
- Followed by: Double Phoenix

The Spawn of Cthulhu is an anthology of fantasy short stories, edited by American writer Lin Carter. It was first published in paperback by Ballantine Books in October 1971 as the thirty-sixth volume of its Ballantine Adult Fantasy series. It was the fifth anthology assembled by Carter for the series.

== Summary ==
The book collects twelve fantasy tales and poems by various authors that either influenced or were influenced by the Cthulhu Mythos stories of H. P. Lovecraft, including one story by Lovecraft himself, with an overall introduction and notes by Carter.

== Contents ==
- "Introduction: About The Spawn of Cthulhu and H. P. Lovecraft" (Lin Carter)
- "The Whisperer in Darkness" (H. P. Lovecraft)
- "An Inhabitant of Carcosa" (Ambrose Bierce)
- "The Yellow Sign" (from The King in Yellow) (Robert W. Chambers)
- "Cordelia’s Song from The King in Yellow" (Vincent Starrett)
- "The Return of Hastur" (August Derleth)
- "Litany to Hastur" (from Dreams from R'lyeh) (Lin Carter)
- "The Children of the Night" (Robert E. Howard)
- "K’n-yan" (Walter C. DeBill, Jr.)
- "The Tale of Satampra Zeiros" (Clark Ashton Smith)
- "The Hounds of Tindalos" (Frank Belknap Long)
- "The Curse of Yig" (Zealia Brown Reed Bishop)
- "The Mine on Yuggoth" (Ramsey Campbell)
