= At the Edge of the World (short story collection) =

Collection of short fiction by Lord Dunsany

- Cover of At the Edge of the World
- Author: Lord Dunsany
- Cover artist: Ray Cruz
- Language: English
- Series: Ballantine Adult Fantasy series
- Genre: Fantasy
- Publisher: Ballantine Books
- Publication date: 1970
- Publication place: United States
- Media type: Print (paperback)
- Pages: xi, 238
- ISBN: 0-345-01879-6
- Preceded by: The King of Elfland's Daughter
- Followed by: Don Rodriguez: Chronicles of Shadow Valley

At the Edge of the World is a collection of fantasy short stories by Irish writer Lord Dunsany, edited by Lin Carter. It was first published in paperback by Ballantine Books as the thirteenth volume of its Ballantine Adult Fantasy series in March 1970. It was the series' second Dunsany volume, and the first collection of his shorter fantasies assembled by Carter.

The book collects thirty short pieces by the author, with an introduction and afterword by Carter.

== Contents ==
- "Introduction: The Dreams of Mānā-Yood-Sushāi" (Lin Carter)
- "The Cave of Kai"
- "Of the Gods of Averon" (original title: "The Sorrow of Search")
- "Mlideen"
- "The King That Was Not"
- "The Men of Yarnith"
- "In the Land of Time"
- "Time and the Gods"
- "The Opulence of Yahn" (original title: "Usury")
- "The Fortress Unvanquishable, Save for Sacnoth"
- "Poltarnees, Beholder of Ocean"
- "The Idle City"
- "Bethmoora"
- "Idle Days on the Yann"
- "The Hashish Man"
- "Carcassonne"
- "In Zaccarath"
- "The Dreams of King Karna-Vootra"
- "How the Enemy Came to Thlunrana"
- "The Distressing Tale of Thangobrind the Jeweller, and of the Doom That Befell Him"
- "The Avenger of Perdóndaris"
- "How the Dwarfs Rose Up in War" (original title: "A Petty Quarrel")
- "The Probable Adventure of the Three Literary Men"
- "The Loot of Bombasharna"
- "The Injudicious Prayers of Pombo the Idolator"
- "The Bride of the Man-Horse"
- "The Quest of the Queen's Tears"
- "How One Came, as Was Foretold, to the City of Never"
- "A Day at the Edge of the World" (original title: "The Long Porter's Tale")
- "Erlathrodonion" (original title: "A Tale of the Equator")
- "Epilogue" to The Book of Wonder
- "Afterword" (Lin Carter)

== Sources ==
- Joshi, S. T. (1993). Lord Dunsany: a Bibliography / by S. T. Joshi and Darrell Schweitzer. Metuchen, N.J.: The Scarecrow Press, Inc. pp. 29–30.
