= Excalibur (novel) =

1973 novel by Sanders Anne Laubenthal

- First edition
- Author: Sanders Anne Laubenthal
- Cover artist: Gervasio Gallardo
- Language: English
- Genre: Fantasy novel
- Publisher: Ballantine Books
- Publication date: 1973
- Publication place: United States
- Media type: Print (hardcover)
- Pages: xii, 236 pp
- ISBN: 0-345-23416-2
- OCLC: 2370651

Excalibur is a 1973 Arthurian fantasy novel by American writer Sanders Anne Laubenthal. It was first published by Ballantine Books as the sixtieth volume of the Ballantine Adult Fantasy series in August, 1973, and has been reprinted a number of times since.

== Plot summary ==
The novel is set in modern times against the background of the legendary Medieval Welsh colonization of Mobile, Alabama under the prince Madoc in the 12th century. The modern Pendragon, King Arthur's secret successor, must recover Arthur's famed sword Excalibur.

== Critical reception ==
John Clute praised Excalibur as "a powerful fantasy which conflates the matter of Britain with an American Gothic version of Mobile, Alabama."
