= Discoveries in Fantasy =

1972 anthology edited by Lin Carter

- Cover of the first edition.
- Author: Edited by Lin Carter
- Cover artist: Peter Le Vasseur
- Language: English
- Series: Ballantine Adult Fantasy series
- Genre: Fantasy
- Publisher: Ballantine Books
- Publication date: 1972
- Publication place: United States
- Media type: Print (Paperback)
- Pages: 243
- ISBN: 0-345-02546-6
- Preceded by: Double Phoenix
- Followed by: Great Short Novels of Adult Fantasy I

Discoveries in Fantasy is an anthology of fantasy short stories, edited by American writer Lin Carter. It was first published in paperback by Ballantine Books in March 1972 as the forty-third volume of its Ballantine Adult Fantasy series. It was the seventh such anthology assembled by Carter for the series.

== Summary ==
The book collects seven tales by four neglected fantasy authors, Ernest Bramah, Donald Corley, Richard Garnett and Eden Phillpotts, with an overall introduction and notes by Carter. The cover illustrates a scene from one of the tales, Donald Corley's "The Bird with the Golden Beak".

== Contents ==
- "Introduction" (Lin Carter)
- "The Vision of Yin" (Ernest Bramah, from The Wallet of Kai Lung)
- "The Dragon of Chang Tao" (Ernest Bramah, from Kai Lung's Golden Hours)
- "The Bird with the Golden Beak" (Donald Corley, from The Haunted Jester)
- "The Song of the Tombelaine" (Donald Corley, from The House of Lost Identity)
- "The Poet of Panopolis" (Richard Garnett, from The Twilight of the Gods and Other Tales)
- "The City of Philosophers" (Richard Garnett, from The Twilight of the Gods and Other Tales)
- "The Miniature" (Eden Phillpotts)
