= Double Phoenix =

1971 anthology of two fantasy novellas by Edmund Cooper and Roger Lancelyn Green

- Cover of first edition.
- Author: Edmund Cooper and Roger Lancelyn Green; edited by Lin Carter
- Cover artist: Gervasio Gallardo
- Language: English
- Series: Ballantine Adult Fantasy series
- Genre: Fantasy
- Publisher: Ballantine Books
- Publication date: 1971
- Publication place: United States
- Media type: Print (Paperback)
- ISBN: 0-345-02420-6
- OCLC: 39057470
- Preceded by: The Spawn of Cthulhu
- Followed by: Discoveries in Fantasy

Double Phoenix is an anthology of two fantasy novellas by Edmund Cooper and Roger Lancelyn Green, edited by American writer Lin Carter. It was first published in paperback by Ballantine Books in November 1971 as the thirty-seventh volume of its Ballantine Adult Fantasy series. It was the sixth anthology assembled by Carter for the series.

== Summary ==
The book collects two fantasy novellas, together with three introductory essays on the works, their authors and the book itself by Carter.

== Contents ==
- "About Double Phoenix" (Lin Carter)
- "About The Firebird and Edmund Cooper: Phoenix Times Two" (Lin Carter)
- "About From the World's End and Roger Lancelyn Green" (Lin Carter)
- "The Firebird" (Edmund Cooper)
- "From the World's End" (Roger Lancelyn Green)
