= Transat =

Transat may refer to:

- Transat A.T., Canadian tour and travel agency
  - Air Transat, Canadian airline owned by Transat A.T.
- Concept Composites MD03 Transat, French ultralight aircraft
- "The Transat", also called the Single-Handed Trans-Atlantic Race
- Transat Café-L'Or, a double-handed transatlantic yacht race
- Mini Transat Race, a single-handed yacht race in 6.5m boats

== See also ==
- Transit (disambiguation)
