= The Werewolf of Ponkert =

1958 short story collection by H. Warner Munn

- Dust-jacket from the first edition
- Author: H. Warner Munn
- Cover artist: Harry Whewell
- Language: English
- Genre: Horror
- Publisher: The Grandon Company
- Publication date: 1958
- Publication place: United States
- Media type: Print (hardback)
- Pages: 138 pp
- OCLC: 15639767

The Werewolf of Ponkert is a collection of two horror short stories by H. Warner Munn. It was published in book form with its sequel in 1958 by The Grandon Company in an edition of 350 unnumbered copies, all of which were signed by the author.

The volume was reissued as a hardback book by Centaur Books of New York in 1971, and as a paperback edition in 1976.

The first story, "The Werewolf of Ponkert" arose from a comment by H.P. Lovecraft suggesting a story written from the werewolf's point of view. The volume is dedicated to Lovecraft.

The stories, from Munn's Tales of the Werewolf Clan series (collected in book form, 2 vols., 1979), first appeared in the magazine Weird Tales. The first story was originally published in Weird Tales magazine, Vol. 6, No. 1, Issue 22, July 1925. The sequel, "The Werewolf's Daughter" (in abridged form) was published in Weird Tales, Vol. 12, No. 4, No. 5 & No. 6 (Issues 61, 62 & 63) in October 1928, November 1928 & December 1928.

== Contents ==
- "The Werewolf of Ponkert"
- "The Werewolf's Daughter"

== Sources ==
- Chalker, Jack L.; Mark Owings (1998). The Science-Fantasy Publishers: A Bibliographic History, 1923-1998. Westminster, MD and Baltimore: Mirage Press, Ltd. p. 316.
- Tuck, Donald H. (1978). The Encyclopedia of Science Fiction and Fantasy. Chicago: Advent. p. 324. ISBN 0911682228.
