= Deryni Rising =

1970 novel by Katherine Kurtz

- Cover illustration by Bob Pepper for the first edition of Deryni Rising
- Author: Katherine Kurtz
- Cover artist: Bob Pepper
- Language: English
- Series: The Chronicles of the Deryni
- Genre: Fantasy
- Publisher: Ballantine Books
- Publication date: 1970
- Publication place: United States
- Media type: Print (paperback and hardcover)
- Pages: xiv, 271 (first edition), 269 (revised hardcover edition)
- ISBN: 0-345-01981-4 (first edition), ISBN 0-441-01168-3 (revised hardcover edition)
- Preceded by: The Childe Morgan Trilogy (literary chronology)
- Followed by: Deryni Checkmate

Deryni Rising is a historical fantasy novel by American-born author Katherine Kurtz. It was first published by Ballantine Books as the nineteenth volume of the Ballantine Adult Fantasy series in August 1970, and was reprinted at least ten times over the next three decades. In 2004, the author released a revised and updated edition of the novel that was published by Ace Books. Deryni Rising was the first of Kurtz' Deryni novels to be published, though some of her later works served as prequels, detailing events that occurred before the time period of Deryni Rising. As a result, the storyline of the Childe Morgan Trilogy immediately precedes Deryni Rising, despite the fact that it was published over thirty years after the first novel.

== Plot introduction ==
The novel is set in the land of Gwynedd, one of the fictional Eleven Kingdoms. Gwynedd itself is a medieval kingdom similar to the British Isles of the 12th century, with a powerful Holy Church (based on the Roman Catholic Church), and a feudal government ruled by a hereditary monarchy. The population of Gwynedd includes both humans and Deryni, a race of people with inherent psychic and magical abilities who have been shunned and persecuted for centuries. The book takes place almost entirely within Gwynedd's capital city of Rhemuth, and deals primarily with the struggle of young Prince Kelson Haldane to secure his throne from the machinations of a Deryni usurper.

== Plot summary ==
The book covers a two-week period in November 1120, beginning with the death of King Brion Haldane while leading a hunting party outside the city of Rhemuth. Immediately following Brion's death, his son and heir Prince Kelson sends for his father's closest friend and advisor, Alaric Morgan, the Deryni Duke of Corwyn. Morgan arrives shortly before Kelson's coronation, but his efforts to assist the prince are interrupted by Kelson's mother, Queen Jehana. However, Kelson manages to thwart Jehana's attempts to imprison Morgan, and the duke resumes his efforts to protect Kelson.

Morgan informs Kelson that Brion had wielded magical powers of his own, despite the fact that Brion was not Deryni. Known as "the Haldane potential", it is a trait of the Haldane line to acquire Deryni-like powers once they have been activated in the subject. Morgan believes that Brion designed a magical ritual to awaken those powers in Kelson. Furthermore, Morgan suspects that Kelson will need those powers to defend himself from Princess Charissa Furstána-Festila, a Deryni sorceress who intends to attack Kelson during his coronation and claim the throne of Gwynedd.

During the course of the night, Morgan and his cousin, Monsignor Duncan McLain, attempt to decipher the clues left by Brion. After a bloody encounter in the royal crypt, the cousins discover that they both possess the Deryni talent for Healing, an ability that has been lost for two centuries. They eventually attempt to activate Kelson's magical abilities, but are disappointed when the ritual appears to fail. Later that night, Morgan encounters Charissa in the palace and the sorceress proudly admits to murdering Brion.

During Kelson's coronation the following morning, Charissa appears and challenges the prince to a Duel Arcane, an ancient form of magical combat. Morgan attempts to answer the challenge in his role as King's Champion, but Charissa's own champion seriously wounds the Deryni duke before being defeated, leaving Morgan unable to deal with Charissa herself. However, seeing her son's danger, Jehana attacks Charissa with magic, revealing that her fanatical hatred of Deryni has concealed her own Deryni heritage. Nonetheless, Charissa easily defeats Jehana, and Kelson is forced to personally duel with the sorceress. As the combat is about to begin, Kelson suddenly unravels the last of his father's clues and activates his own powers. Using both his Haldane powers and his newly discovered Deryni heritage, Kelson manages to defeat Charissa. With the Pretender now dead, Kelson is crowned as King of Gwynedd.

== Characters ==
- Prince Kelson Haldane: Prince of Gwynedd and heir of King Brion Haldane
- Duke Alaric Morgan: Duke of Corwyn and Lord General of the Royal Armies, close friend and advisor of King Brion, maternal cousin of Duncan McLain
- Monsignor Duncan McLain: Priest of the Holy Church of Gwynedd, tutor to Prince Kelson, maternal cousin of Alaric Morgan
- Duchess Charissa Furstána-Festila: Duchess of Tolán and the Festillic Pretender
- Earl Ian Howell: Earl of Eastmarch
- Queen Jehana: mother of Prince Kelson and widow of King Brion
- Archbishop Edmund Loris: Archbishop of Valoret and Primate of All Gwynedd
- Earl Sean "Derry" O'Flynn: Earl of Derry and aide to Alaric Morgan
- Prince Nigel Haldane: Prince of Gwynedd and Duke of Carthmoor, brother of King Brion and uncle of Prince Kelson

== Criticism ==
In her 1972 speech on style in fantasy, "From Elfland to Poughkeepsie," Ursula K. Le Guin quoted briefly from Deryni Rising without identifying the novel or the writer. After expressing an apology "to the author of the passage for making a horrible example of her" when there were "infinitely worse examples," Le Guin explained how something had "gone wrong in the book and the passage... [and] I think it is the style.... [I]n this book something good has gone wrong—something real has been falsified."

== Awards and nominations ==
Deryni Rising was a finalist for the 1971 Mythopoeic Fantasy Award for outstanding work in the field of fantasy literature. The other finalists were Lloyd Alexander's The Marvelous Misadventures of Sebastian and Roger Zelazny's Nine Princes in Amber. However, the award was won by Mary Stewart for her novel, The Crystal Cave.

In 1971, Deryni Rising ranked 12th in an annual poll of Locus magazine readers, placing it between Dean Koontz's Beastchild and D. G. Compton's Chronocules. (The poll was won by Larry Niven's Ringworld.) In a 1987 poll, the readers of Locus ranked Deryni Rising as the 29th greatest fantasy novel of all time, placing it in a tie with E. R. Eddison's The Worm Ouroboros. In 1998, Locus conducted a survey to determine the greatest fantasy novels published before 1990, and Deryni Rising was ranked 30th by the magazine's readers. Both the 1987 poll and the 1998 poll were won by J. R. R. Tolkien's The Lord of the Rings.

== Release details ==
- 1970, USA, Ballantine Books ISBN 0-345-01981-4, Paperback
- 1973, USA, Ballantine Books ISBN 0-345-09771-8, Paperback
- 1974, USA, Ballantine Books ISBN 0-345-24495-8, Paperback
- 1976, USA, Ballantine Books ISBN 0-345-25290-X, Pub date 12 March 1976, Paperback
- 1978, USA, Del Rey Books ISBN 0-345-27599-3, Pub date 12 February 1978, Paperback
- 1980, USA, Del Rey Books ISBN 0-345-29105-0, Pub date 12 May 1980, Paperback
- 1981, USA, Del Rey Books ISBN 0-345-30426-8, Pub date 12 September 1981, Paperback
- 1984, USA, Del Rey Books ISBN 0-345-31987-7, Pub date 12 September 1984, Paperback
- 1985, USA, Del Rey Books ISBN 0-345-33604-6, Pub date 12 December 1985, Paperback
- 1985, UK, Century Publishing ISBN 0-7126-0848-6, Paperback
- 1985, UK, Century Publishing ISBN 0-7126-1013-8, Pub date 26 September 1985, Hardcover
- 2004, USA, Ace Books ISBN 0-441-01168-3, Pub date 6 July 2004, Hardcover
