= Over the Hills and Far Away =

Over the Hills and Far Away may refer to:

== Music ==
- "Over the Hills and Far Away" (traditional song), a 17th-century song
  - Over the Hills & Far Away: The Music of Sharpe, a soundtrack album
- "Air Bharr na G-Cnoc 's an Ime G-Céin — Over the Hills and Far Away" by Seán "Clárach" Mac Domhnaill (written c. 1715), see Mo Ghile Mear
- "Over the Hills and Far Away" (Led Zeppelin song)
- "Over the Hills and Far Away" (Gary Moore song)
- Over the Hills and Far Away (EP), an EP by Nightwish, which includes a cover of the Gary Moore song
- "Over the Hills and Far Away", a 1976 single by Kevin Johnson
- "Over the Hills and Far Away", an orchestral piece by Frederick Delius
- "Children's March: Over the Hills and Far Away", a children's march by Percy Grainger
- "Over the Hills and Far Away", a 1908 popular song by William Jerome (w.) and Jean Schwartz (m.)
- "Over the Hills and Far Away", a song by The Mission from the 1987 album The First Chapter
- "Over the Hills and Far Away", a phrase from the opening theme from the 1997 children’s series Teletubbies

== Other uses ==
- Over the Hills and Far Away (short story collection), by Edward Plunkett, 18th Baron Dunsany
- Over the Hills and Far Away, a 2002 novel by Candida Lycett Green
- "Over the Hills and Far Away", an episode of One Tree Hill
- "Over the Hills and Far Away", an episode of That '70s Show
- Over the Hills and Far Away (film), the original name of the 2009 documentary film The Horse Boy
