= Tales of the Werewolf Clan =

Collection of horror short stories

- Dust jacket from the first edition of Volume One
- In The Tomb of the Bishop (1979); The Master Goes Home (1980)
- Author: H. Warner Munn
- Illustrator: Jeffrey K. Potter
- Genre: Horror fiction
- Publisher: Donald M. Grant, Publisher, Inc. (US)
- Published: 1979-1980

Tales of the Werewolf Clan is a two-volume collection of horror short stories by American writer H. Warner Munn. The first volume was first published in 1979 by Donald M. Grant, Publisher, Inc. in an edition of 1,000 copies and the second was published in 1980 in an edition of 1,018 copies. Many of the stories first appeared in the magazine Weird Tales or in the Lost Fantasies anthology series edited by Robert Weinberg. The first volume is subtitled In the Tomb of the Bishop and the second is subtitled The Master Goes Home.

== Contents ==
=== Volume One ===
- Foreword
- "The Cat-Organ"
- "Hau! Hau! Huguenots"
- "The Wreck of the Santa Ysabel"
- "The Bug-Wolves of Castle Manglana"
- "In The Tomb of the Bishop"
- "The Leather Cannon"
- "Achsah Young—of Windsor"

Dust-jacket from the first edition of Volume Two.

=== Volume Two ===
- "The Master Meets A Worthy Foe"
- "The Diary"
- "In the Hulks"
- "In Regard to the Opening of Doors"
- "The Transients"
- "The Master Goes Home"

== Sources ==
- Chalker, Jack L.; Mark Owings (1998). The Science-Fantasy Publishers: A Bibliographic History, 1923-1998. Westminster, MD and Baltimore: Mirage Press, Ltd. pp. 325–327.
- Reginald, Robert (1992). Science Fiction and Fantasy Literature 1975-1991. Detroit: Gale Research. pp. 696. ISBN 0-8103-1825-3.
