= Realms of Wizardry =

1976 anthology edited by Lin Carter

Realms of Wizardry: An Anthology of Adult Fantasy
- Dust cover of the first edition.
- Editor: Lin Carter
- Cover artist: Robert Aulicino
- Language: English
- Genre: Fantasy
- Publisher: Doubleday
- Publication date: 1976
- Publication place: United States
- Media type: Print (hardcover)
- Pages: xv, 269
- ISBN: 0-385-11393-5
- OCLC: 2372325
- Dewey Decimal: 813/.0876
- LC Class: PZ1 .R255 PS648.F3
- Preceded by: Kingdoms of Sorcery

Realms of Wizardry: An Anthology of Adult Fantasy is an American anthology of fantasy stories, edited by American writer Lin Carter. It was first published in hardcover by Doubleday in December 1976 as the second of two such anthologies continuing a series of nine assembled by Carter for the Ballantine Adult Fantasy series.

== Summary ==
The book collects sixteen tales and excerpts from novels by various fantasy authors, with an overall introduction and notes on the individual authors by Carter. The collection is a companion volume to Carter's earlier anthology Kingdoms of Sorcery (1976).

== Contents ==
- "Introduction: The Horns of Elfland" (Lin Carter)
- I. Fantasy as Legend

- "Lord Dunsany" (Lin Carter)
- "The Hoard of the Gibbelins" (Lord Dunsany)
- "The Doom That Came to Sarnath" (H. P. Lovecraft)
- "H. P. Lovecraft" (Lin Carter)
- "Robert Bloch" (Lin Carter)
- "Black Lotus" (Robert Bloch)
- "Gary Myers" (Lin Carter)
- "The Gods of Earth" (Gary Myers)

- II. Fantasy as Satire

- "Richard Garnett" (Lin Carter)
- "The City of Philosophers" (Richard Garnett)
- "James Branch Cabell" (Lin Carter)
- "Some Ladies and Jurgen" (excerpt from Jurgen) (James Branch Cabell)
- "Donald Corley" (Lin Carter)
- "The Book of Lullûme" (Donald Corley)

- III. Fantasy as Romance

- "H. Rider Haggard" (Lin Carter)
- "The Descent Beneath Kôr" (excerpt from She) (H. Rider Haggard)
- "A. Merritt" (Lin Carter)
- "The Whelming of Cherkis (excerpt from The Metal Monster) (A. Merritt)
- "Hannes Bok" (Lin Carter)
- "How Orcher Broke the Koph (excerpt from The Sorcerer's Ship) (Hannes Bok)

- IV. Fantasy as Adventure Story

- "Robert E. Howard" (Lin Carter)
- "Swords of the Purple Kingdom" (Robert E. Howard)
- "Clifford Ball" (Lin Carter)
- "The Goddess Awakes" (Clifford Ball)
- "C. L. Moore and Henry Kuttner" (Lin Carter)
- "Quest of the Starstone" (C. L. Moore and Henry Kuttner)

- V. New Directions in Fantasy

- "Jack Vance" (Lin Carter)
- "Liane the Wayfarer" (Jack Vance)
- "Michael Moorcock" (Lin Carter)
- "Master of Chaos" (Michael Moorcock)
- "Roger Zelazny" (Lin Carter)
- "Thelinde's Song" (Roger Zelazny)

- "Other Realms of Wizardry: Suggestions for Further Reading" (Lin Carter)
