= Deryni Checkmate =

1972 novel by Katherine Kurtz

- Cover illustration by Bob Pepper for the first edition of Deryni Checkmate
- Author: Katherine Kurtz
- Cover artist: Bob Pepper
- Language: English
- Series: The Chronicles of the Deryni
- Genre: Fantasy
- Publisher: Ballantine Books (first edition), Ace Books (revised edition)
- Publication date: 1972
- Publication place: United States
- Media type: Print (Paperback & Hardcover)
- Pages: xiii, 302 pp (first edition), 336pp (Revised hardcover edition)
- ISBN: 0-345-02598-9 (first edition), ISBN 0-441-01341-4 (revised hardcover edition)
- OCLC: 20741741
- Preceded by: Deryni Rising
- Followed by: High Deryni

Deryni Checkmate is a fantasy novel by American-born author Katherine Kurtz. It was first published by Ballantine Books as the forty-sixth volume of the Ballantine Adult Fantasy series in May 1972, and has been reprinted a number of times since. The author released a revised and updated edition of the novel that was published by Ace Books in 2005. Deryni Checkmate was the second of Kurtz' Deryni novels to be published, and also the second book in the Chronicles of the Deryni Trilogy.

== Plot introduction ==
The novel is set in the land of Gwynedd, one of the fictional Eleven Kingdoms. Gwynedd itself is a medieval kingdom similar to the British Isles of the 12th century, with a powerful Holy Church (based on the Roman Catholic Church), and a feudal government ruled by a hereditary monarchy. The population of Gwynedd includes both humans and Deryni, a race of people with inherent physic and magical abilities who have been shunned and persecuted for centuries. The book takes place several months after Deryni Rising, and details the consequences of the events that surrounded the coronation of young King Kelson Haldane. Horrified by the demonstrations of Deryni magic that occurred during the coronation, the leaders of the Holy Church of Gwynedd decide to take a stand against the Deryni, particularly Duke Alaric Morgan and Monsignor Duncan McLain. Kelson, Morgan, and Duncan must find a way to thwart the vengeance of the Church while also preparing for a possible invasion by a foreign enemy.

== Plot summary ==
Deryni Checkmate takes places in March 1121, four months after the coronation of fourteen-year-old King Kelson Haldane. The novel opens with the rabidly anti-Deryni leader of the Holy Church, Archbishop Edmund Loris, signing a letter that demands that the Deryni Duke of Corwyn, Alaric Morgan, recant his magical powers and submit to a life of penance. If he fails to do so, Loris threatens to excommunicate Morgan and place his entire duchy under interdict. Additionally, Morgan's cousin, Monsignor Duncan McLain, is suspended and summoned to an ecclesiastical trial to answer for his part in the events surrounding Kelson's coronation. After being warned of the threat, Kelson sends Duncan to warn Morgan of the upcoming trouble, fearing that Duncan's hidden Deryni heritage may be revealed by a trial.

Duncan travels to Morgan's capital city of Coroth, where he informs his cousin of Loris' threat. In addition to the ecclesiastical threat, Morgan's duchy is being ravaged by an anti-Deryni fanatic named Warin de Grey, and the neighboring kingdom of Torenth is preparing to launch an invasion of Gwynedd. Fearing that an internal Gwyneddan conflict will weaken the kingdom prior to fighting an external enemy, Morgan and Duncan eventually decide to travel to the city of Dhassa and personally appeal to the Curia of Bishops. However, en route to Dhassa, Morgan is drugged and captured by Warin, who intends to burn the Deryni duke as a heretic. Duncan manages to rescue his cousin, but is forced to reveal his Deryni powers to ensure their escape.

When the Curia learns of the cousins' actions, the two are soon excommunicated. Morgan and Duncan realize that appealing to the Curia is no longer an option, so they set out to meet with Kelson. Loris attempts to place Corwyn under Interdict, but a group of bishops refuses to participate in an action that would punish an entire duchy for the actions of its duke. Loris rages against the rebels, but he and his supporters are thrown out of Dhassa, effectively splitting the Curia.

Kelson has traveled to the city of Culdi to attend the wedding of Morgan's sister, Bronwyn, and Duncan's half-brother, Kevin. Unknown to anyone, a jealous architect named Rimmell has fallen in love with Bronwyn and seeks to win her affections through the use of a love charm he acquires from an old witch woman. However, Rimmell's plan backfires horribly, and the charm kills both Bronwyn and Kevin. By the time Morgan and Duncan arrive in Culdi, Rimmell has been executed for his crime. Though Morgan is crushed with grief over the death of his sister, Kelson reminds him that he must still see to his duties. Facing an internal ecclesiastical schism, rebel fanatics ravaging his lands, and an imminent invasion from Torenth, Kelson cannot allow Morgan to wallow in his grief. Morgan agrees, and returns to his duties in service to the throne of Gwynedd.

== Characters ==
Cover of a later paperback edition.

- King Kelson Haldane: King of Gwynedd
- Duke Alaric Morgan: Duke of Corwyn, Lord General of the Royal Armies, King's Champion, cousin of Duncan McLain
- Monsignor Duncan McLain: Priest of the Holy Church of Gwynedd, cousin of Alaric Morgan
- Archbishop Edmund Loris: Archbishop of Valoret and Primate of All Gwynedd
- Warin de Grey: anti-Deryni fanatic in the Duchy of Corwyn
- Earl Sean "Derry" O'Flynn: Earl of Derry and aide to Duke Alaric Morgan
- Bishop Thomas Cardiel: Bishop of Dhassa
- Bishop Denis Arilan: Auxiliary Bishop of Rhemuth
- Lady Bronwyn de Morgan: sister of Duke Alaric Morgan
- Earl Kevin McLain: Earl of Kierney and half-brother of Father Duncan McLain
- Rimmell: an architect in the service of Duke Jared McLain of Cassan

== Awards and nominations ==
Deryni Checkmate was a finalist for the 1973 Mythopoeic Fantasy Award for outstanding work in the field of fantasy literature. The other finalists were Ursula K. Le Guin's The Farthest Shore, Poul Anderson's The Dancer from Atlantis, Thomas Burnett Swann's Green Phoenix, and Roger Zelazny's The Guns of Avalon. Kurtz and Zelazny had both been nominated for the same award in 1971, each for the first books of their signature series (Kurtz' Deryni Rising and Zelazny's Nine Princes in Amber), but they both lost to The Crystal Cave, the first novel in Mary Stewart's signature series. In 1973, Kurtz and Zelazny lost again, this time to Evangeline Walton's The Song of Rhiannon.

In 1973, Deryni Checkmate ranked 15th in an annual poll of Locus magazine readers, placing it between Jack Vance's The Brave, Free Men and Barry N. Malzberg's Beyond Apollo. (The poll was won by Isaac Asimov for his novel, The Gods Themselves.)

== Release details ==
Cover of the revised hardcover edition of Deryni Checkmate (2005).

- 1972, U.S., Ballantine Books ISBN 0-345-22598-8, publication date 12 April 1972, Paperback
- 1975, U.S., Ballantine Books ISBN 0-345-24496-6, publication date 12 January 1975, Paperback
- 1976, U.S., Ballantine Books ISBN 0-345-25291-8, publication date 12 March 1976, Paperback
- 1977, U.S., Del Rey Books ISBN 0-345-27102-5, publication date 12 February 1977, Paperback
- 1980, U.S., Del Rey Books ISBN 0-345-29224-3, publication date 12 June 1980, Paperback
- 1981, U.S., Del Rey Books ISBN 0-345-30593-0, publication date 12 December 1981, Paperback
- 1984, U.S., Del Rey Books ISBN 0-345-31791-2, Paperback
- 1984, U.S., Del Rey Books ISBN 0-345-31791-2, publication date 12 June 1984, Paperback
- 1985, UK, Century Publishing ISBN 0-7126-0849-4, Paperback
- 1986, U.S., Del Rey Books ISBN 0-345-33747-6, publication date 12 July 1986, Paperback
- 1989, UK, Legend Books ISBN 0-09-961950-4, Paperback
- 2005, U.S., Ace Books ISBN 0-441-01341-4, publication date 6 December 2005, Hardcover
