= Over the Hills and Far Away (short story collection) =

Collection of short fiction by Lord Dunsany

- Cover of Over the Hills and Far Away
- Author: Lord Dunsany
- Cover artist: Gervasio Gallardo
- Language: English
- Series: Ballantine Adult Fantasy series
- Genre: Fantasy
- Publisher: Ballantine Books
- Publication date: 1974
- Publication place: United States
- Media type: Print (paperback)
- Pages: xii, 234 pp
- ISBN: 0-345-23886-9
- OCLC: 1211558

Over the Hills and Far Away is a collection of fantasy short stories by Lord Dunsany, edited by Lin Carter. It was first published in paperback by Ballantine Books as the sixty-fifth volume of its celebrated Ballantine Adult Fantasy series in April 1974. It was the series' sixth Dunsany volume, and the third collection of his shorter fantasies assembled by Carter.

The book collects a poem, two plays and thirty-four short pieces by the author, including several of his Jorkens stories, with an introduction by Lin Carter. A poem by H. P. Lovecraft, in tribute to Dunsany, is also included.

== Contents ==
- "Happy Far-Off Things", An Introduction by Lin Carter
- "On Reading Lord Dunsany", A Tribute by H. P. Lovecraft (poem)
- I. Tales of the World's Edge

- "Editor's Note"
- "The Journey of the King"
- "The Fall of Babbulkund"
- "The Bird of the Difficult Eye"
- "The Secret of the Sea"
- "The Compromise of the King of the Golden Isles" (play)

- II. Tales of the Far Away

- "Editor's Note"
- "The House of the Sphinx"
- "Blagdaross"
- "The Lonely Idol"
- "The Archive of the Older Mysteries"
- "The Loot of Loma"
- "The Last Dream of Bwona Khubla"
- "The Queen's Enemies" (play)
- "How Plash-Goo Came to the Land of None's Desire"
- "The Prayer of Boob Aheera"
- "East and West"
- "How the Gods Avenged Meoul Ki Ning"
- "The Man with the Golden Ear-Rings"
- "Poor Old Bill"

- III. Tales of Near At Hand

- "Editor's Note"
- "The Bad Old Woman in Black"
- "The Field"
- "Where the Tides Ebb and Flow"
- "The Little City"
- "The Highwayman"
- "In the Twilight"
- "The Ghosts"
- "The Doom of La Traviata"
- "A Narrow Escape"
- "The Lord of Cities"
- "The Unhappy Body"
- "The Gifts of the Gods"
- "On the Dry Land"
- "The Unpasturable Fields"

- IV. Tales Jorkens Told

- "Editor's Note"
- "The Curse of the Witch"
- "Hunting the Unicorn"
- "The Pale-Green Image"
- "The Sacred City of Krakovlitz"

- "At Sunset" (poem)
