= The Charwoman's Shadow =

Novel by Lord Dunsany (1926)

- Dust-jacket for The Charwoman's Shadow (US edition)
- Author: Lord Dunsany
- Language: English
- Genre: Fantasy
- Publisher: G. P. Putnam's Sons (London and New York)
- Publication date: March 1926
- Publication place: United Kingdom & United States (simultaneous)
- Media type: Print (hardback)
- Pages: viii+339 (UK edition) v+294 (US edition)
- Preceded by: Don Rodriguez: Chronicles of Shadow Valley

The Charwoman's Shadow is a 1926 fantasy novel by Anglo-Irish writer Lord Dunsany. It is among the pioneering works in the field, published before the genre was named "fantasy".

The book was reprinted in paperback by Ballantine Books as the fifty-fifth volume in its celebrated Ballantine Adult Fantasy series in February 1973. It contains elements of the (later named) subgenres of historical fantasy and fairytale fantasy.

== Plot summary ==
In Spain, during its Golden Age, a lord wishes to marry his daughter to a neighbor, but has no money for her dowry. He sends his son Ramon to a nearby magician who had befriended his father, in hopes that the son would learn to turn lead to gold. An old charwoman without a shadow works for the magician. The magician persuades him to trade his shadow for the knowledge, and gives him a substitute, and the charwoman who works for the magician laments that. He then learns that his substitute shadow does not grow and shrink when the sun is low or high, as it ought to, making it difficult to mix with ordinary people except at certain times of day.

His sister sends him a letter asking him to get her a love potion instead. He persuades the magician to teach him that instead, and he compounds it and gives it to his sister. When her betrothed husband arrives with a friend of his, a duke, she gives the potion to the duke, who falls deathly ill. Terrified, she nurses him; he recovers his health, enraged with everyone else, especially her betrothed, but in love with her.

Their priest dispels Ramon's false shadow but sends him back to retrieve his own – for without it his soul is in danger of damnation. He tricks the magician into telling him some of the magic words needed to open the box where the shadows are kept, and works out the rest. He takes out his own shadow and tries to find the charwoman's. He goes back to her to tell her that he cannot find it. She tells him that it was the one of a beautiful young girl. He brings it to her, and when the woman and her shadow reunite, she is transformed back into that beautiful girl, as if the shadow were casting her.

They find that her family is long gone from the neighboring village, and Ramon brings her home. With the duke in love with his sister, his father intends to make a grand match for him. Ramon tries to appeal to his sister for help; she refuses to hear him without the duke. Angry, he pours out the story – including that their marriage makes his impossible – and the duke says he will appeal to the king. The king decrees "an ample pardon for her low birth" for the former charwoman, after which "it became treason to speak of the low birth of Anemone", and both pairs of lovers marry.

The magician despairs of finding a worthy apprentice, and sets out through Spain, drawing all creatures of magic and legend with him, and leaves for the Country Beyond the Moon's Rising, thus ending the Golden Age.

== Critical reception ==
Reviewing the 1973 Ballantine edition, Theodore Sturgeon declared the novel to be one of the most potent early influences on him: "I love [the] book with an abiding passion as a perennial evocation of delight and humor and beauty".

Everett F. Bleiler found the novel to be an "excellent" example of "a traditional fairytale [with] many nice touches".

Neil Barron described The Charwoman's Shadow as "an excellent fantasy in the tradition of George MacDonald".

== References in other media ==
Track 8 on the album High Life by Wayne Shorter “Midnight in Carlotta’s Hair” is a reference to a line from the novel.

== Sources ==
- Bleiler, Everett (1948). The Checklist of Fantastic Literature. Chicago: Shasta Publishers. p. 104.
