= The Twilight of the Gods and Other Tales =

- Cover of expanded 1903 edition
- Author: Richard Garnett
- Language: English
- Genre: Fantasy short stories
- Publisher: T. Fisher Unwin
- Publication date: November 1888
- Publication place: United Kingdom
- Media type: Print (Hardcover)
- Pages: 346 pp

The Twilight of the Gods and Other Tales is a collection of fantasy short stories by Richard Garnett, generally considered a classic in the genre. Its title notwithstanding, the collection "has nothing to do with the Norse gods—although it draws upon everything else, from Arabic legends and Chinese fairy tales to Roman history and Greek mythology." The title story actually concerns the release of Prometheus, upon the ultimate eclipse of Greek paganism by Christianity, from the torture to which he was sentenced by Zeus.

== Publication ==
The collection was first published in hardcover by T. Fisher Unwin in 1888. A "new and augmented edition" was published by John Lane in 1903. In this form the collection continued to be reprinted and available through 1911. An edition with an introduction by T. E. Lawrence and illustrations by Henry Keen was published in 1924 by John Lane and by Dodd, Mead in the United States.

Its importance in the history of fantasy literature was recognized by the inclusion of two of its tales ("The Poet of Panopolis" and "The City of Philosophers") in the anthology Discoveries in Fantasy, edited by Lin Carter and published by Ballantine Books as the forty-third volume of the celebrated Ballantine Adult Fantasy series in March, 1972. Carter intended to reissue the complete collection as a volume in the series, though this hope was not realized.

== Contents ==
The original edition of the book collected sixteen tales by the author; the 1903 edition added twelve more. Stories added in the 1903 edition are indented.

- "The Twilight of the Gods"
- "The Potion of Lao-Tsze"
- "Abdallah the Adite"
- "Ananda the Miracle-Worker"
- "The City of Philosophers"
- "The Demon Pope"
- "The Cupbearer"

- The Wisdom of the Indians"

- "The Dumb Oracle"
- "Duke Virgil"

- "The Claw"
- "Alexander the Ratcatcher"
- "The Rewards of Industry"

- "Madam Lucifer"

- "The Talismans"

- "The Elixir of Life"
- "The Poet of Panopolis"
- "The Purple Head"

- "The Firefly"
- "Pan's Wand"
- "A Page From the Book of Folly"

- "The Bell of St. Euschemon"
- "Bishop Addo and Bishop Gaddo"

- "The Philosopher and the Butterflies"
- "Truth and Her Companions"
- "The Three Palaces"
- "New Readings in Biography"

- "The Poison-Maid"
- Notes

== Reception ==
Mary Butts praised The Twilight of the Gods, writing in 1925 "How immensely effective is Dr. Garnett's method, The Twilight of the Gods because he knows the trick of telling realistically the mystery tale". In a memoir of his early life, Fritz Leiber wrote that he and his friend Harry Otto Fischer enjoyed reading "Richard Garnett's witty Twilight of the Gods" in the 1930s. E. F. Bleiler has described The Twilight of the Gods as a "collection of stories which cover many times and places with cosmopolitan learning [and which] is almost unique in literature. Wryly whimsical narratives, rather than formal stories, they are gracefully expressed, witty, and timeless. Only Vernon Lee has been able to work successfully in the same vein". Brian Stableford has praised The Twilight of the Gods as containing "deft and delicate fantasies" whose moral is "that Epicurean humanism is always to be preferred to Puritan intolerance". In a 1932 letter to his friend Brenda Salkeld, George Orwell described reading the book as "positively a duty" and praised "The Purple Head" as "excellent". "The Poison-Maid" inspired Ralph Vaughan Williams's comic opera The Poisoned Kiss.
