= The Fifth Son of the Shoemaker =

1930 novel by Donald Corley

- Dust cover of the first edition
- Author: Donald Corley
- Cover artist: Donald Corley
- Language: English
- Genre: Novel
- Publisher: Robert M. McBride
- Publication date: 1930
- Publication place: United States
- Media type: Print (hardback)
- Pages: 282 pp.
- Preceded by: The House of Lost Identity
- Followed by: The Haunted Jester

The Fifth Son of the Shoemaker is a book by Donald Corley, illustrated by the author. It was his best known work and his only novel, though according to Lin Carter it is actually "a volume of short stories under the guise of a novel." The book was first published in hardcover in New York by Robert M. McBride in September 1930.

== Plot ==
The book concerns the story of a Russian family of hereditary shoemakers who have immigrated from Moscow to New York, their establishment in a humble East Side cellar, rise from rags to riches, and travels around the world.

== Reception ==
The New York Times called the novel Corley's "best-known work."

Lin Carter describes Corley's style as possessing a quality of "gorgeousness", which he characterizes as having "the sort of verbal richness that bejewels the pages of Clark Ashton Smith's work or the Arabian Nights ... lazy and singing, [with] a certain playfulness to it ..."
