= Donald Corley =

American novelist

- Born: June 8, 1886; Covington, Georgia
- Died: December 11, 1955 (aged 69); New York City
- Occupations: Short story author; illustrator; architect
- Writing career
- Genres: Fantasy, mainstream fiction
- Notable work: The House of Lost Identity

James Donald Corley (1886–1955) was an American author of short stories, illustrator and architect. He is chiefly remembered for his three self-illustrated books, which included a number of classic fantasy short stories.

== Life and career ==
Corley was born June 28, 1886, in Covington, Newton County, Georgia, the son of John J. and Annie (Bradshaw) Corley. His mother was the daughter of James Bradshaw, Presbyterian minister and President of the college for girls In Covington. He was living with his parents in Covington in 1900. He graduated from Emory University and studied architecture in Europe. As an adult, he was tall, of slender build, with brown eyes and black hair.

In 1910 he was a lodger at 308 West 15th Street, New York City, and gave his occupation as architect. He married Harriet Evelyn Works (who later wrote as Harriet Works Corley) on July 23, 1916, three days after meeting her; the marriage dissolved within a year, although the couple apparently had a daughter. He was employed for a time by the New York firm of McKim, Meade & White, "playing a part in the work of decoration of the General Post Office." Despite no longer living with his wife, he claimed exemption from the draft in June, 1919 on account of having a dependent wife and child. At that time he was unemployed, while giving his profession as architect, and resided at 62 Perry Street, New York, New York. Later, however, he claimed to be a veteran of the World War, possibly on the strength of designing camouflage for New York harbor during the conflict. In 1920 he was living singly as a lodger together with other writers and artists.

Corley contributed as a writer to a number of magazines from the late 1910s through the early 1930s, including Scribner's Magazine, the Pictorial Review, Harper's Magazine, and The Forum. By 1922, at which point he had already published several stories, he had "given up his architectural work in order to devote his time to writing and drawing." As an artist he illustrated many magazine articles and books in addition to his own works. By the early 1920s he had "become known as a draftsman in black and white and in colored inks, and a portfolio of his black-and-white drawings was published" in 1921.

Corley married again about 1924 to Mary, last name unknown; she was born about 1890 in Alabama. In 1925 he lived at 163 East 35th Street, New York City, and gave his occupation as writer or artist. In 1930 he was living with his wife Mary at 123 East 36th Street, New York City. He gave his profession as writer of books.

By this time his first short story collection had been published; it was titled The House of Lost Identity after the initial story in it, and was brought out by Robert M. McBride in 1927. The book was reasonably well-received, particularly by James Branch Cabell, who wrote the introduction, "A Note for the Intending Reader.". Corley's best-known work was his second book, The Fifth Son of the Shoemaker (1930). It and the subsequent The Haunted Jester (1931) appear to have sold less well than his first book, however, and afterwards he stopped publishing. He continued writing into his old age, well after abandoning his architectural profession.

In 1942 he was living at 184 1/2 West 4th Street in New York City, and in 1955 at 264 Avenue of the Americas in New York. He died on Sunday, December 11, 1955, at the age of 69 at St. Vincent's Hospital, New York. He was survived by his daughter Sheila and brother John Neill Corley. Neill would not claim Donald's body, so he was buried in Potters Field.

== Posthumous reputation ==
The Haunted Jester and The House of Lost Identity were reprinted by Books for Libraries in 1970 and 1971, respectively. Not long after, Corley's work was rediscovered by Lin Carter, who anthologized two of his fantasies in Discoveries in Fantasy for the Ballantine Adult Fantasy series in 1972, and another in Realms of Wizardry for Doubleday in 1976. Carter describes Corley's style as possessing a quality of "gorgeousness", which he characterizes as having "the sort of verbal richness that bejewels the pages of Clark Ashton Smith's work or the Arabian Nights ... lazy and singing, [with] a certain playfulness to it ..."

Mike Ashley in The Encyclopedia of Fantasy called Corley's stories "exotic fantasy ... affect[ing] a flamboyant style, especially those with Arabian or oriental settings. His tales are much influenced by Lord Dunsany and James Branch Cabell. DC's stories are often self-indulgent, but have a captivating flair."

== Bibliography ==
=== Books ===
- The House of Lost Identity (1927)
- The Fifth Son of the Shoemaker (1930)
- The Haunted Jester (1931)

=== Short works ===
- "De Senectute" (Oct. 1919)
- "The Daimyō's Bowl" (Nov. 1919; collected in The House of Lost Identity, 1927)
- "The Last Day of Childhood" (Nov. 1920)
- "Footsteps" (play, produced 1922)
- "The God from the Shelf" (Jan. 1922; collected in The Haunted Jester, 1931)
- "Ethel Wallaci, Gay Primitive" (Feb. 1922)
- "Marooned" (poem, Apr. 1922)
- "The Book of the Debts" (Aug. 1922; collected in The House of Lost Identity, 1927)
- "Ex Rustico fit Nitidus" (poem, Sep. 1922)
- "The Price of Reflection" (Mar. 1923; collected in The House of Lost Identity, 1927)
- "The Legend of the Little Horses" (Oct. 1924; collected in The House of Lost Identity, 1927)
- "The Manacles of Youth" (Dec. 1924; collected in The House of Lost Identity, 1927)
- "The Glass Eye of Throgmorton" (Jun. 1926; collected in The House of Lost Identity, 1927)
- "The House of Lost Identity" (Sep. 1926; collected in The House of Lost Identity, 1927)
- "Figs" (collected in The House of Lost Identity, 1927)
- "The Ghost-Wedding" (collected in The House of Lost Identity, 1927)
- "The Tale That the Ming Bell Told" (collected in The House of Lost Identity, 1927)
- "The Song of the Tombelaine" (collected in The House of Lost Identity, 1927)
- "Preface to an Unwritten Novel" (May 1927)
- "The Bride's Feast" (Jan. 1928; collected in The Haunted Jester, 1931)
- "The Eyes of Compassion" (Jan. 1928; collected in The Haunted Jester, 1931)
- "The Eyes of India" (Aug. 1928)
- "The Dance of the Drowned" (Jan. 1931; collected in The Haunted Jester, 1931)
- "Seven Knights in Silver" (collected in The Haunted Jester, 1931)
- "The Red Lacquer Box of Nirr-lo-fan" (collected in The Haunted Jester, 1931)
- "The Lama, the Lady, and the Topaz" (collected in The Haunted Jester, 1931)
- "The Road to Benachie" (collected in The Haunted Jester, 1931)
- "The Troubled Promises of Kings" (collected in The Haunted Jester, 1931)
- "Que le Diable!" (collected in The Haunted Jester, 1931)
- "The Daughter of the Moon" (collected in The Haunted Jester, 1931)
- "Droit de Seigneur" (collected in The Haunted Jester, 1931)
- "Fifteen Annas in the Rupee" (collected in The Haunted Jester, 1931)
- "The Bird with the Golden Beak" (collected in The Haunted Jester, 1931)

== Other references ==
- Donald Corley at the Internet Speculative Fiction Database
- Donald Corley at the Library of Congress, with 5 library catalog records
