= Peter Le Vasseur =

Artist

Peter Le Vasseur (born 1938) is an artist from Guernsey.

Le Vasseur was born in Guernsey in 1938 but evacuated to London during World War II. His art began as a youngster, copying pictures from comics and his talent was noticed by his school teacher. He was later admitted to Harrow Art College. Paintings for his first exhibition at the Portal Gallery in Mayfair were bought by the Duke of Bedford and Ringo Starr, and he was favourably reviewed by The Guardian.

Le Vasseur returned to live in Guernsey in 1975.

He has paintings in public collections including Guernsey Museum and Art Gallery and St James Concert Hall, Guernsey. His painting, The Tree of Life, won The People's Choice award, voted by the people of Guernsey.
