= Transit (Cooper novel) =

1964 novel by Edmund Cooper

- First edition
- Author: Edmund Cooper
- Language: English
- Published: 1964
- Publisher: Faber and Faber

Transit is a science fiction novel by English writer Edmund Cooper, published in February 1964 by Faber and Faber.

== Plot ==
The protagonist Richard Avery reaches down to touch an object, and is whisked 79 light years away from Earth where he finds himself and three other people in a battle-to-the-death situation against alien humanoids, the "Golden Ones", who have been deposited in the same place, and are equally confused why they are there. When the protagonist finally reaches the "Golden Ones", they are of the opinion that it is merely a game, with the killing of human beings the prime objective.

In fact, the combat had been set up by transcendental elder aliens. Their objective was to pick the future rulers of the sector, by means of a small contest, sparing both races an inevitable long and bloody large scale war. Albeit the "Golden" seem stronger and swifter, the humans eventually prevail because they are able to show compassion.
