= Don Rodriguez: Chronicles of Shadow Valley =

Novel by Lord Dunsany (1922)

- Cover of the first paperback edition
- Author: Lord Dunsany
- Cover artist: Bob Pepper (Ballantine paperback)
- Language: English
- Series: Ballantine Adult Fantasy series
- Genre: Fantasy short stories
- Publisher: G. P. Putnam's Sons
- Publication date: 1922
- Publication place: United States
- Media type: Print (paperback)
- Followed by: The Charwoman's Shadow

Don Rodriguez: Chronicles of Shadow Valley is a fantasy novel by Lord Dunsany, issued in the United States under this title and in the United Kingdom as The Chronicles of Rodriguez. The first editions, in hardcover, were published simultaneously in London and New York by G. P. Putnam's Sons in February 1922. The first paperback edition was published by Ballantine Books as the thirtieth volume of its Ballantine Adult Fantasy series in May 1971. It was the series' third Dunsany volume. The Ballantine edition includes an introduction by series editor Lin Carter. It and later editions use the American title.

== Plot summary ==
A coming of age story set in the mythical "golden age" of Spain. The titular character is excluded from the inheritance of the family castle on the grounds that given his expertise with sword and mandolin he should be able to win his own estate and bride. Setting out to achieve his place in the world, Rodriguez quickly acquires a Sancho Panza-like servant, Morano, and goes on to experience a series of extraordinary adventures that lead him into the heart of fantasy in the mythopoeic Shadow Valley.
