= H. Warner Munn =

American novelist

Harold Warner Munn
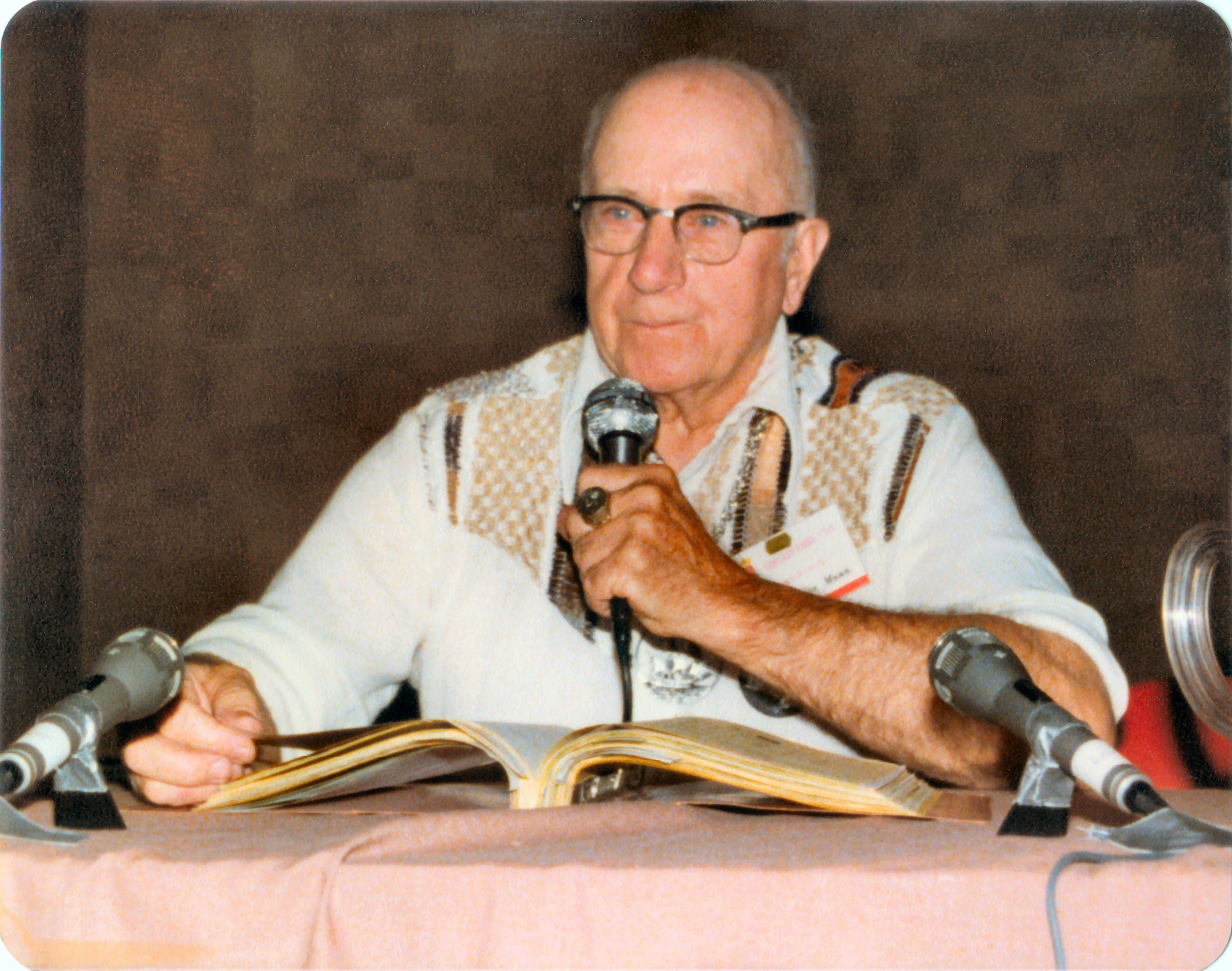
- H. Warner Munn in 1978. Photo by Will Hart.
- Born: November 5, 1903; Athol, Massachusetts
- Died: January 10, 1981 (aged 77); Tacoma, Washington
- Occupations: Novelist; short story author; poet
- Writing career
- Pen name: H. Warner Munn
- Genres: Fantasy, horror, poetry
- Notable works: Tales of the Werewolf Clan, Merlin's Ring

Harold Warner Munn (November 5, 1903 – January 10, 1981) was an American writer of fantasy, horror and poetry, best remembered for his early stories in Weird Tales. He was an early friend and associate of authors H. P. Lovecraft and Seabury Quinn. He has been described by fellow author Jessica Amanda Salmonson, who interviewed him during 1978, as "the ultimate gentleman" and "a gentle, calm, warm, and good friend." He was known for his intricate plotting and the careful research that he did for his stories, a habit he traced back to two mistakes made when he wrote his early story "The City of Spiders".

A resurgence of interest in his work occurred during the 1970s due to its appearance in the Ballantine Adult Fantasy series and the successor fantasy series published with the imprint of Del Rey Books.

In addition to writing, Munn collected books and classic pulp magazines, including Air Wonder Stories, Amazing Stories, Astounding and other science fiction titles, along with Argosy, Argosy All Story, Cavalier, Weird Tales (to the end of the Wright publication series), and others. Also in his library were books consisting of serialized stories from magazines, notably works by George Allan England such as "Darkness and Dawn". About three fourths of his collection was ruined by exposure to weather during a relocation and had to be destroyed.

During his last years Munn lived in Tacoma, Washington in a house he had built himself. He did his writing either in his living room or in the attic room that constituted his library. During this time he was working on an additional volume of the Merlin series to be called The Sword of Merlin, which he did not live to finish. He was befriended at this time by the young writer W. H. Pugmire, who was influenced by Munn's work.

== Early career ==
Munn began writing in the 1920s. He adopted the name "H. Warner Munn" in imitation of two writers he admired, H. Rider Haggard and H. Bedford-Jones.

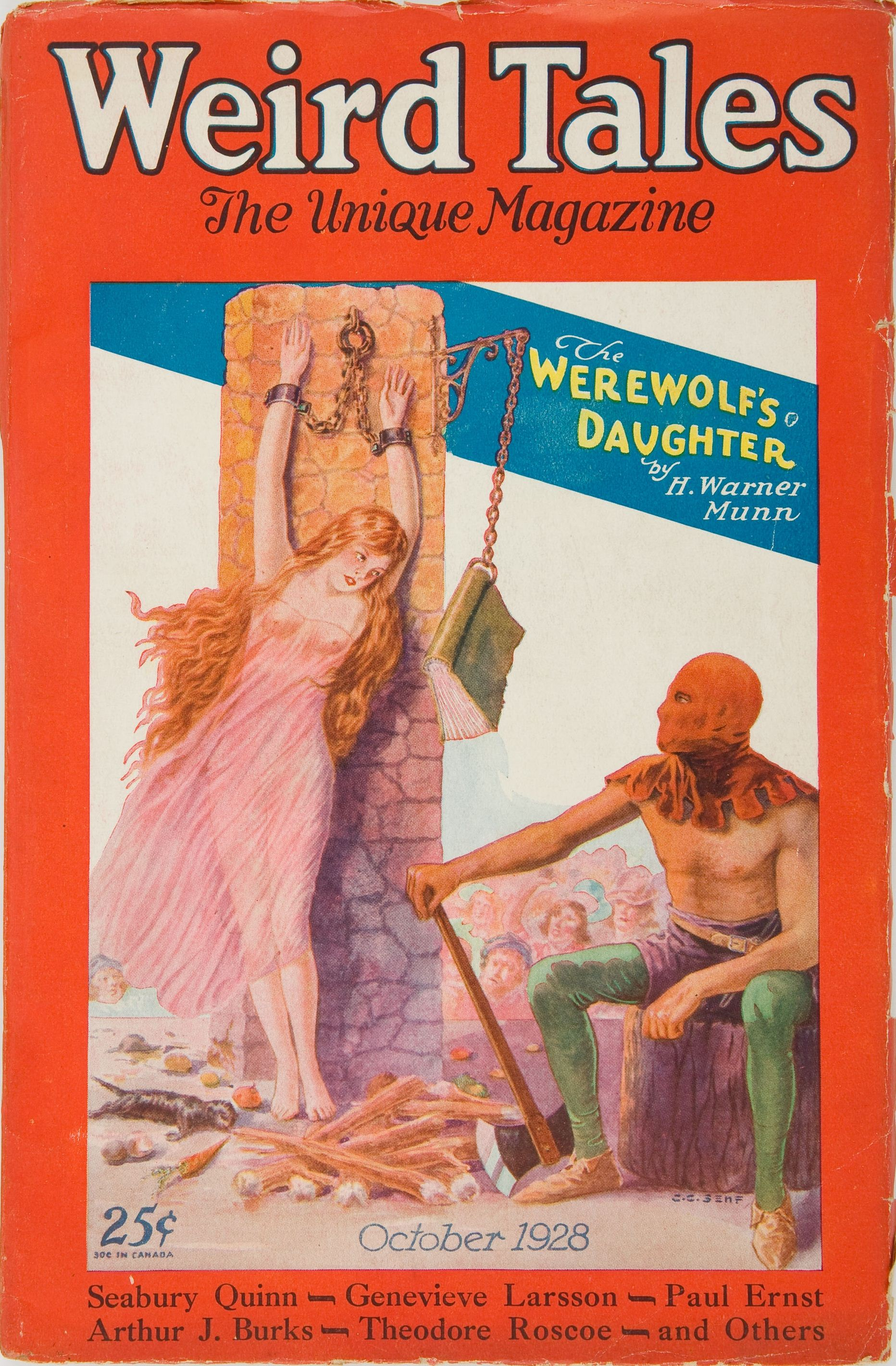
Munn's "The Werewolf's Daughter" was the cover story in the October 1928 Weird Tales

Munn was a major early contributor to the pulp magazine Weird Tales during the 1920s and 1930s, with the editorship of Farnsworth Wright. Munn's first, "The Werewolf of Ponkert" (1925 WT) arose from a comment by H.P. Lovecraft suggesting a story written from the werewolf's point of view. Munn's resulting tales became the first of a series, "The Tales of the Master". The series included a serial, "The Werewolf's Daughter" (1928 WT) and this and the initial story appeared as The Werewolf of Ponkert (1958). Munn later continued the Werewolf Clan stories; these dealt with the descendants of the werewolf in the first story. The plots of the Werewolf Clan tales revolved between the struggle between the titular family and "The Master", a supernatural villain that Munn based on Charles Maturin's Melmoth the Wanderer. When the change of editors of the magazine from Farnsworth Wright to Dorothy McIlwraith; McIlwraith used different writers, Munn's major market was eliminated. Munn later reworked the other stories and added extensively to the series, most of these tales appearing initially in Robert Weinberg's "Lost Fantasies" series, and then in book form as Tales of the Werewolf Clan #1: In the Tomb of the Bishop (1979) and Tales of the Werewolf Clan #2: The Master Goes Home (1979).

The two series of works for which he is known best, his Merlin saga and the Tales of the Werewolf Clan, were both started during the Weird Tales period. King of the World's Edge, the first Merlin novel, was written as early as 1925. On publication (Weird Tales, 1939) it was compared favorably to the stories of Robert E. Howard, of whose fiction Munn confessed to being a great admirer. The novel starts in the last days of King Arthur, and follows the adventures of Myrdhinn (Merlin) and a Roman centurion, who leave Britain for new lands to the West, and find themselves in the kingdom of the Aztecs. King of the World's Edge has been described as a Sword and sorcery novel.

== Later career ==
After Weird Tales ceased publishing his work, Munn generally did not seek new outlets. he devoted to his time to family duties for many years and worked in various trades from sawmill operator to ice cream salesman. It was not until he lost a knee cap in one of these jobs that Munn returned to full-time writing around 1965.

With the exception of the 1980 epic historical novel, The Lost Legion, his post-Weird Tales output was minor, most of it either self-published in small press editions or issued haphazardly by publishers who sought him. While he had already completed The Ship from Atlantis, the second installment of the Merlin Saga, in 1941, it was only published 26 years later, when Donald A. Wollheim contracted to publish King of the World's Edge in book form and also accepted the sequel. The Ship from Atlantis follows the further adventures of Gwalchmai, who sets out for Rome but becomes lost in the Sargasso Sea and encounters a survivor from Atlantis. These two novels, later combined under the title Merlin's Godson (omnibus 1976), are a precursor to Munn's magnum opus, Merlin's Ring (1974).

The publication of his last great work of fantasy, Merlin's Ring (third of the series), was also the result of a publisher seeking him. Reprising Wollheim's role, Lin Carter, editor of the Ballantine Adult Fantasy series, learned of it while enquiring about the availability of the first two Merlin books. In the event, it was issued by Ballantine Books soon after the end of Carter's connection with the publisher, in the interregnum between the Adult Fantasy series and Ballantine's new Del Rey Books fantasy series. Merlin's Ring explores the Atlantean and Arthurian influences down through history to the time of Joan of Arc. Del Rey later completed Carter's original intention by reissuing both of the first two books in a single volume with the title of Merlin's Godson.

Munn was fascinated by Joan of Arc and wrote an extensive narrative poem about her, The Banner of Joan (1975). Although essentially nonfantastic - other than in Joan's spirit-driven zeal - the poem may be seen as an epilogue to the Merlin sequence.

Robert E. Weinberg was responsible for the revival and completion of the Werewolf Clan stories when he expressed an interest in reprinting them in his periodical Lost Fantasies. Munn had originally written eight werewolf stories for Weird Tales before its change of editorship; he now wrote two more to fill gaps in the sequence, and the entire series appeared in three parts in Lost Fantasies, nos. 4–6, 1976–77, as "Ten Tales of the Werewolf Clan." Afterward Munn wrote and self-published three additional stories to finish the series. The complete series was issued by Donald M. Grant, Publisher, Inc. as Tales of the Werewolf Clan, Volumes 1-2 (1979–80).

Some of Munn's late horror stories were published in such anthology series as Daw Books’ The Year's Best Horror Stories. After his retirement he produced a number of stories for small-press magazines, especially Weirdbook. He developed a new sequence that sought to link Lovecraft's Cthulhu Mythos stories with an Arthur Machen-esque ancient race of Pictish fairies. The published tales are "The Merlin Stone" (1977), "The Stairway to the Sea", and "The Wandered of the Waters", all in Weirdbook. Every birthday and Christmas from 1974 to 1980, Munn issued a booklet as gift for friends. These were usually poetry, but several were short fantasies.

The Lost Legion is Munn's only other published novel. It is a sister to King of the World's Edge but set 400 years earlier at the time of Caligula.

H. Warner Munn was a Founding Syndic, with John Charles Moran, Don Herron, and Donald Sidney-Fryer, of The F. Marion Crawford Memorial Society (Nashville) in 1975. He contributed to the first three numbers of its annual review The Romantist (1977–1979), and also to Number 4-5 (1980–1981) that was an In Memoriam tribute to him.

== Recognition ==
=== Award nominations ===
Merlin's Ring was nominated for the 1975 Mythopoeic Fantasy Award and World Fantasy Award for Best Novel. He was also nominated for the World Fantasy Award for Life Achievement during 1977, 1979, and 1980, and the Balrog Award for Professional Achievement during 1981. His poetry collection The Book of Munn was nominated for the 1980 Balrog Award for the categories of Collection/Anthology and Professional Publication, and his last novel, The Lost Legion, was also nominated for the 1981 Balrog Award for Novel.

=== Awards received ===
He was guest of honor of the 1978 World Fantasy Convention, and won the Balrog Award for Poet during both 1980 and 1981.

He also won the Clark Ashton Smith Award for Poetry, with which he is pictured on the inside of The Book of Munn.

He was mentioned in S01E08 (originally broadcast 5 April 1998) of the British comedy series This Morning With Richard Not Judy in an installment of the running joke Men of Achievement 1974.

== Bibliography ==
=== Series ===
==== Merlin's Godson ====
- King of the World's Edge (1939, 1966)
- The Ship from Atlantis (1967)
- Merlin's Ring (1974)

The first two novels were also issued together as an omnibus edition, Merlin's Godson (1976). A projected final volume of the series to be named The Sword of Merlin was never finished.

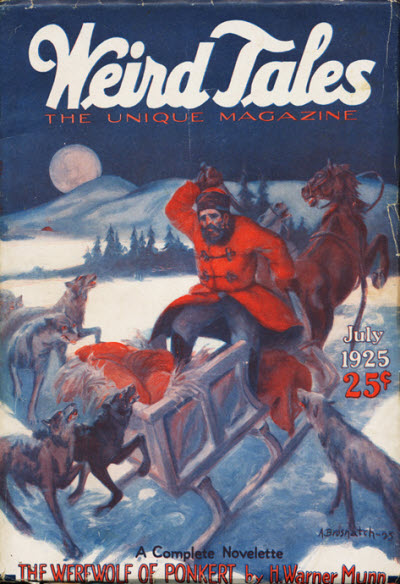
"The Werewolf of Ponkert" first appeared in the July 1925 issue of Weird Tales.

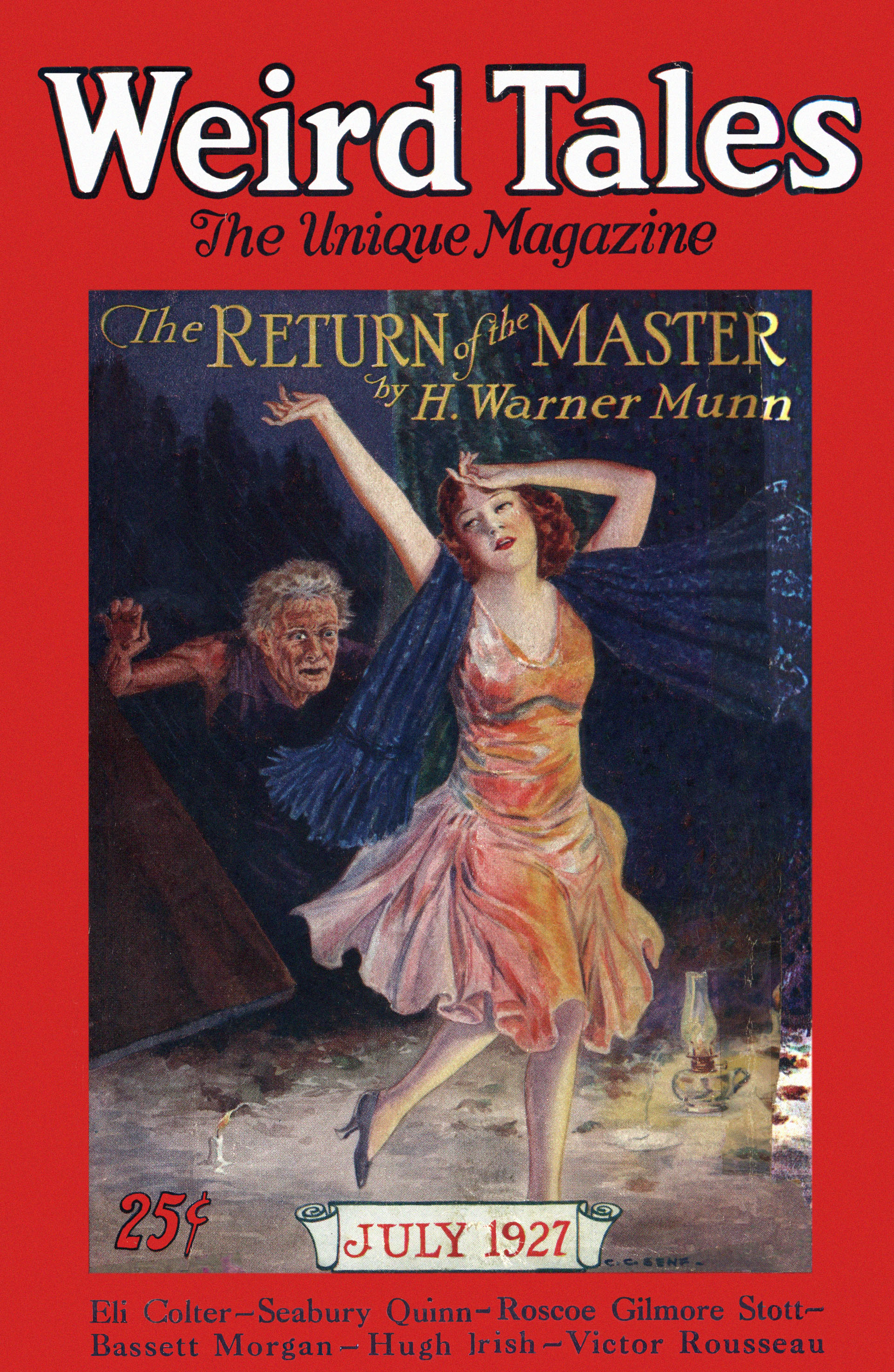
Munn's "The Return of the Master" was the cover story in the July 1927 Weird Tales

==== Tales of the Werewolf Clan ====
- "The Werewolf of Ponkert" (Weird Tales, July 1925)
- "The Return of the Master" (Weird Tales, July 1927)
- "The Werewolf's Daughter" (Weird Tales, October 1928, November 1928, December 1928)
- "Tales of the Werewolf Clan. 1. The Master Strikes" (Weird Tales, November 1930)
  - "The Cat Organ"
  - "Hau! Hau! Huguenots!"
- "Tales of the Werewolf Clan. 2. The Master Fights" (Weird Tales, December 1930)
  - "The Wreck of the Santa Ysabel"
  - "The Bug-Wolves of Castle Manglana"
  - "In the Tomb of the Bishop"
- "Tales of the Werewolf Clan. 3. The Master Has a Narrow Escape" (Weird Tales, January 1931)
  - "The Leather Cannon"
  - "Achsah Young--of Windsor"
- "The Master Meets a Worthy Foe" (Lost Fantasies 5, 1977)
- "The Diary" (Lost Fantasies 6, 1977)
- In the Hulks: A Lost Tale of the Werewolf Clan (1979 chapbook)
- In Regard to the Opening of Doors: A Lost Tale of the Werewolf Clan (1979 chapbook)
- The Transients: A Lost Tale of the Werewolf Clan (1979 chapbook)
- "The Master Goes Home" (Lost Fantasies 6, 1977)

The first three stories, "The Werewolf of Ponkert" and "The Return of the Master" (combined as "The Werewolf of Ponkert") and "The Werewolf's Daughter" were issued together as:

- The Werewolf of Ponkert (1958)

The remaining tales were collected in the volumes:

- Tales of the Werewolf Clan, Volume 1, In the Tomb of the Bishop (October, 1979)

(contains "The Cat-Organ," "Hau! Hau! Huguenots," "The Wreck of the Santa Ysabel," "The Bug-Wolves of Castle Manglana," "In The Tomb of the Bishop," "The Leather Cannon," "Achsah Young—of Windsor")

- Tales of the Werewolf Clan, Volume 2, The Master Goes Home (1980)

(contains "The Master Meets A Worthy Foe," "The Diary," "In the Hulks," "In Regard to the Opening of Doors," "The Transients," "The Master Goes Home")

The entire series was collected in a single volume in:

- Tales of the Werewolf Clan (March 2015)

=== Historical novels ===
- The Lost Legion (1980)

=== Short stories ===
- "The City of Spiders" (1926)
- "The Chain" (1928)
- "A Sprig of Rosemary" (1933)
- "The Wheel" (1933)
- "Dreams May Come" (1939)
- "The Black Captain" (1975)
- The Affair of the Cuckolded Warlock (1975 - chap.)
- "The Merlin Stone" (1977)
- "The Well" (1977)
- "The Stairway to the Sea" (1978)
- What Dreams May Come (1978 - chap.)
- "The De Pertriche Ring" (1979)
- In the Hulks (1979 - chap.)
- The Transient (1979 - chap.)
- The Baby Dryad: A Fanciful Christmas Tale (1980 - chap.)
- "The Wanderers of the Waters" (1981)

=== Poetry collections ===
- Christmas Comes to Little House (1974 - chap.)
- The Banner of Joan (1975) (epic poem)
- Twenty Five Poems (1975)
- Seasons Greetings with Spooky Stuff (1976 - chap.)
- To All Amis (1976 - chap.)
- There was a Man (1977 - chap.)
- The Pioneers (Part One) (1977 - chap.)
- In Regard to the Opening of Doors (1979 - chap.)
- Dawn Woman (1979 - chap.)
- Fairy Gold (1979 - chap.)
- Of Life and Love and Loneliness (1979 - chap.)
- The Book of Munn: or A Recipe for Roast Camel (1979) (edited by Frederick J. Mayer)

=== Poems ===
- "Cradle Song for an Abandoned Werewolf" (1973)
- "Fairy Gold" (1976)
- "Dante Returns from the City" (1976)
- "Limbo" (1976)

=== Nonfiction ===
- "HPL: A Reminiscence" (1979) in Peter Cannon (ed) Lovecraft Remembered
