= The Banner of Joan =

1975 epic poem by H. Warner Munn

- Dust-jacket from the first edition
- Author: H. Warner Munn
- Illustrator: Mike Symes
- Cover artist: Mike Symes
- Language: English
- Genre: Epic poem
- Publisher: Donald M. Grant, Publisher, Inc.
- Publication date: 1975
- Publication place: United States
- Media type: Print (Hardback)
- Pages: 127 pp
- OCLC: 1996159

The Banner of Joan is an epic poem by H. Warner Munn. It was first published in 1975 by Donald M. Grant, Publisher, Inc. in an edition of 975 copies in honor of Munn's appearance as Guest of Honor at the first World Fantasy Convention. The poem concerns Joan of Arc and may be seen as an epilogue to Munn's Merlin novels.
