= Edmund Cooper =

English poet and writer

Edmund Cooper (30 April 1926 – 11 March 1982) was an English poet and prolific writer of speculative fiction, romances, technical essays, several detective stories, and a children's book. These were published under his own name and several pen names.

== Biography ==
Born on 30 Apri 1926, in Marple, near Stockport, Cheshire, Cooper left school at the age of 15. In 1942, he became engaged at 16 to a teacher four years older than he was, and married her four years later on 13 April 1946. He worked as a labourer, then a civil servant, and in 1944, he joined the Merchant Navy. After the war, he trained as a teacher and began to publish verse, then short stories, then novels. Deadly Image, the first novel to appear under his own name, was completed in 1957 and published in 1958 in the United States. (The novel was published in the UK later in 1958 in a variant form and under its better-known title The Uncertain Midnight.) The Uncertain Midnight was adapted without authorisation for Swiss television in 1969. His short story The Brain Child (1956) was adapted as the movie The Invisible Boy (1957), which featured the return of Robby the Robot from Forbidden Planet.

Cooper reviewed science fiction for the Sunday Times from 1967 until his death in 1982.

In 2009, Carol Lake published Those Summers at Moon Farm (United Writers, Cornwall: 978-1-85200-141-4), a roman à clef about the writer and family. The author's comments says 'Although inspired by real people, this story is fiction'. Dedicated in part to Joan and Edmund Cooper, Lake acknowledges one of Cooper's daughters, 'for sharing memories and anecdotes'.

== Work and criticism ==
Cooper was an atheist and an individualist. His science fiction often depicts unconventional male heroes facing unfamiliar and remote environments. His novel, The Uncertain Midnight, was noted for its treatment of the subject of androids, which was considered original at the time of writing. Also mentioned is the subject of the colonisation of planets, which is the basis of Cooper's Expendables series, published under the pen name Richard Avery (the name of the hero of Transit). The Expendables series features an unusual diversity, both in its cast of characters, and in the frank nature of their conversations and attitudes on racial and sexual topics.

Two of Cooper's books depict future Earths dominated by women after the genetic or physical need for men has been reduced. His attitude to women is said to have been controversial. Cooper was quoted as saying: "Let them have totally equal competition ... they'll see that they can't make it." The theme of both books is actually the need to retain both sexes. Five to Twelve ends with the phrase "if we do not make any more mistakes, we can create a balanced world of men and women". The more cynical Who Needs Men? ends by asking whether love of woman for man is worth death for that love.

== Publications ==
=== Novels ===
==== As George Kinley ====
- 1954 Ferry Rocket, Curtis Books

==== As Broderick Quain ====
- 1954 They Shall Not Die, Curtis Books

==== As Martin Lester ====
- 1954, The Black Phoenix, Curtis Books

==== As Edmund Cooper ====
- 1957 The Invisible Boy (chapbook) Ungar Electronics Tools
- 1958 Deadly Image (aka The Uncertain Midnight) Ballantine (Text 1), Hutchinson (Text 2), Panther (Text 2 rev), Hodder (Text 1), Coronet (Text 1), Remploy (Text 2)
- 1959 Seed of Light, Hutchinson (Text 1), Ballantine (Text 2), Panther (Text 1), Coronet (Text 2 rev)
- 1960 Wish Goes to Slumber Land: An Adventure in Plasticene, Hutchinson
- 1964 Transit, Faber & Faber, Lancer, 4 Square, Coronet, Ace, Remploy
- 1966 All Fools' Day, Hodder & Stoughton, Walker, Coronet, Berkley, Remploy
- 1967 A Far Sunset, Hodder & Stoughton, Walker, Berkley Medallion, Hodder, Ace
- 1968 Five to Twelve, Hodder & Stoughton, Putnam, Doubleday/SFBC, Hodder, Berkley, Coronet
- 1969 Seahorse in the Sky, Hodder & Stoughton, Hodder, Putnam, SFBC, Coronet, Berkley, Ace
- 1969 The Last Continent, Dell, Hodder & Stoughton, Hodder, Coronet
- 1970 Son of Kronk, Hodder & Stoughton; later as Kronk, Putnam, Berkley, Coronet
- 1971 The Overman Culture, Hodder & Stoughton, Putnam, Berkley Medallion, Readers Union, Coronet
- 1972 Who Needs Men?, Hodder & Stoughton, Coronet; later as Gender Genocide, Ace
- 1973 The Tenth Planet, Putnam, Hodder & Stoughton, Readers Union, Berkley, Coronet
- 1973 The Cloud Walker, Hodder & Stoughton, Ballantine, Coronet
- 1974 Prisoner of Fire, Hodder & Stoughton, Walker, Coronet
- 1974 The Slaves of Heaven, Putnam, SFBC, Hodder & Stoughton, Berkley Medallion, Coronet
- 1978 Merry Christmas, Ms Minerva!, Robert Hale
- 2014 SF Gateway Omnibus: The Cloud Walker, All Fools' Day, A Far Sunset, Gollancz

==== As Richard Avery ====
The Expendables Series:

- 1975 The Expendables (1) The Deathworms of Kratos, Coronet, Fawcett Gold Medal, Severn House; later as The Deathworms of Kratos by Cooper, 1979
- 1975 The Expendables (2) The Rings of Tantalus, Coronet, Fawcett Gold Medal, Severn House; later as The Rings of Tantalus by Cooper, 1979
- 1975 The Expendables (3) The War Games of Zelos, Coronet, Fawcett Gold Medal; later as The War Games of Zelos by Cooper, 1980
- 1976 The Expendables (4) The Venom of Argus, Coronet, Fawcett Gold Medal; later as The Venom of Argus by Cooper, 1980

=== Short stories (collections) ===
- 1958 Tomorrow's Gift, Ballantine, Digit
- 1960 Voices in the Dark, Digit
- 1963 Tomorrow Came, Panther
- 1964 The Square Root of Tomorrow, Robert Hale
- 1968 News from Elsewhere, Mayflower, Berkley
- 1971 Unborn Tomorrow, Robert Hale
- 1971 Double Phoenix (with Roger Lancelyn Green) (edited by Lin Carter, "Adult Fantasy" series), Ballantine
- 1979 Jupiter Laughs and Other Stories, Hodder & Stoughton, Readers' Union, Coronet
- 1980 World of Difference, Robert Hale

=== Short stories by Edmund Cooper ===
- 1963 "The Piccadilly Interval" in Tomorrow Came, Panther
- 1969 "The Lizard of Woz" Reprinted by permission of the author in Flying Saucers (1982) by Isaac Asimov, Martin Harry Greenberg and Charles G. Waugh, ISBN 0-449-21400-1

=== Work adapted for the screen ===
- 1957 The Invisible Boy from The Brain Child 1956
- 1969 The Uncertain Midnight (French) TV serial, unauthorised
- 1979 Death Watch as "OBN in Arrivo", part of series I racconti di fantascienza directed by Alessandro Blasetti (Rai, Italy)"
