= Sanders Anne Laubenthal =

American poet

- Born: December 25, 1943; Mobile, Alabama
- Died: May 15, 2002 (aged 58); Washington, D.C.
- Occupation: Author
- Writing career
- Genre: Fantasy
- Notable work: Excalibur (1973)

Sanders Anne Laubenthal (December 25, 1943 – May 15, 2002) was an American poet, novelist, historian and textbook writer.

== Life ==
Laubenthal served the United States Air Force from the time of the Vietnam War, starting writing on-the-job training books for trainees in comic book style to train for lower level jobs such as dining hall cooks. She served as editor of many Air Force professional journals. Having reached the rank of Major in the Air Force, she retired, but continued to do research and write many reports/articles for the military. She had just finished her last military project and received payment for another reprint for Excalibur before she died from diabetic complications. Friends describe her as a quiet lady who was loyal and always creating.

== Literary career ==
Much of Laubenthal's work concerns Mobile, Alabama, of which she was a native. She also wrote about the history of unrecorded areas of Scotland. She is best known, however, for one major work, the Arthurian fantasy Excalibur, first published in the Ballantine Adult Fantasy series in August 1973 and reprinted a number of times since.

== Bibliography ==
=== Novels ===
- The Last Confederate (1967)
- Excalibur (1973)

=== Poetry ===
- Songs of Mobile (1962)
- The Gates of Wonder (1966)
- Interlude and Other Poems (1969)

=== Nonfiction ===
- A History of John Hay Air Base, Baguio City, Philippines (1981)
