= Phantastes =

1858 fantasy novel by George MacDonald

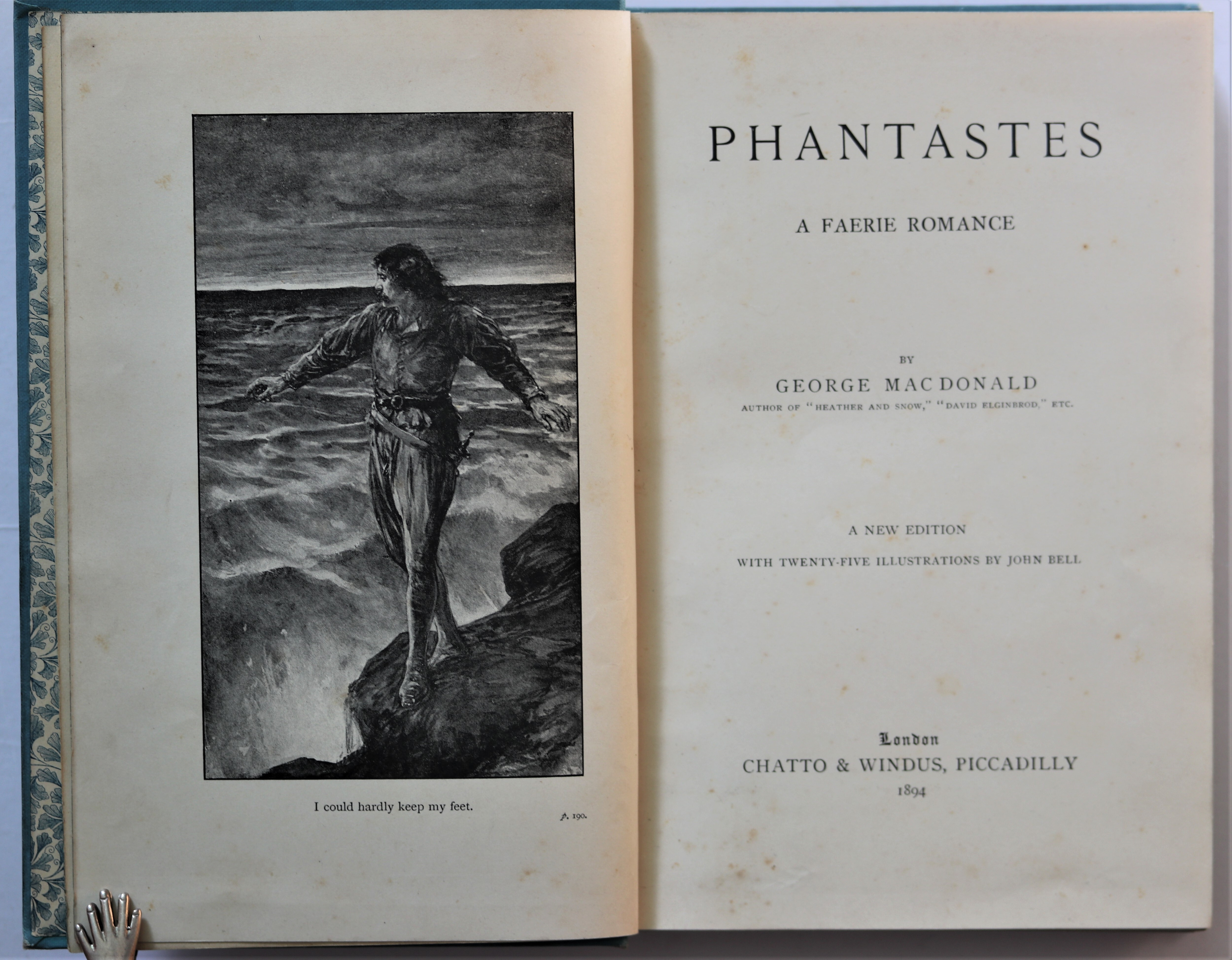
- Frontispiece and title page, illustrated by John Bell
- Author: George MacDonald
- Language: English
- Genre: Fantasy
- Publisher: Smith, Elder & Co.
- Publication date: 1858
- Publication place: United Kingdom
- Media type: Print (Hardback & Paperback)
- Pages: 323
- Text: Phantastes at Wikisource

Phantastes: A Faerie Romance for Men and Women is a fantasy novel by Scottish writer George MacDonald published in London in 1858.

The story centres on the character Anodos ("pathless" in Greek) and takes its inspiration from German Romanticism, particularly Novalis. The story concerns a young man who is pulled into a dreamlike world and there hunts for his ideal of female beauty, embodied by the "Marble Lady". Anodos lives through many adventures and temptations while in the other world, until he is finally ready to give up his ideals.

The book influenced the fantasy authors C. S. Lewis, J. R. R. Tolkien, and G. K. Chesterton and also the poet W. H. Auden.

== Plot ==
The tale starts the day after Anodos' twenty-first birthday. He discovers an ancient fairy lady in the desk that he inherited as a birthright from his late father. After the fairy shows him Fairy Land in a vision, Anodos awakes the next day to find that his room is transforming into a forest, which he soon finds to be Fairy Land itself.

Anodos then encounters a woman and her daughter in a cottage who warn him about the evil Ash Tree and the Alder Tree. He is told that the spirits of trees can leave their tree-hosts and wander throughout Fairy Land. He then explores the world of the fairies, which live in flowers. He then has a nightmarish encounter with the spirit of the Ash Tree, escapes, and finds rest in the warmth and love of the Beech Tree's spirit.

He finds a marble statue by Pygmalion. When he sings to it, the statue flees from him. He pursues the Marble Lady, but finds instead the Maid of the Alder Tree in disguise. The Maid deceives Anodos into letting his guard down so the Ash can attack. He narrowly escapes doom, being saved by the knight Sir Percivale. Anodos then meets a woman and her daughter who believe in fairy tales and the magic of Fairy Land, despite the disbelief of the woman's husband. Anodos also finds his shadow, an evil presence that follows and torments Anodos throughout the rest of the story.

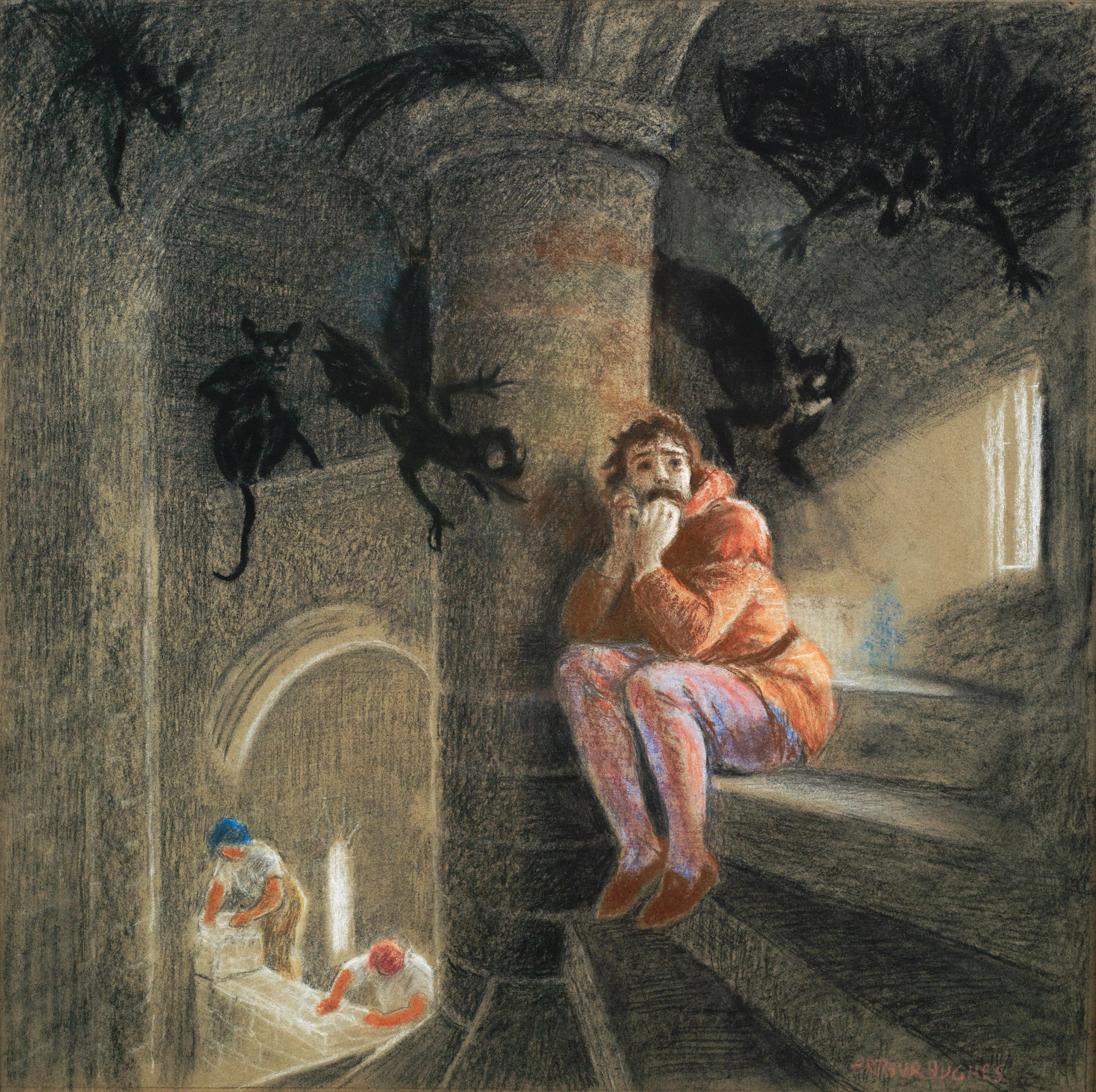
Dark thoughts by Arthur Hughes

Anodos finds a large palace with many rooms, including a bedroom labelled as his own. In the palace library, he reads the story of Cosmo of Prague. Cosmo is a believer in fantasy who sacrifices his life to free the soul of his lover from an enchanted mirror.

Anodos spends much time in the palace. He comes upon corridors filled with still statues. Anodos explores the halls and realises that the statues dance in the halls, and return quickly to their pedestals when he enters. He dreams of the marble lady, that she alone has an empty pedestal among the statues. He later finds this pedestal and sings to it. The marble lady materialises on the pedestal, but flees him. Anodos follows, going into a strange subterranean world with gnome-like Kobolds that mock him.

Anodos escapes this place and finds himself on the beach of a stormy sea. A boat takes him to an "island" with a cottage with four doors which is inhabited by an ancient lady. Anodos enters each door in turn, each containing a different world. In the first he becomes a child again, remembering the death of his brother. In the next door he finds the marble lady and Sir Percivale in love. Here Anodos makes a last outburst of his love for the marble lady. The next door recounts the death of a loved one of Anodos, and he finds his family mausoleum. Finally, Anodos travels through the last door ("the door of the timeless") but is saved by the ancient lady without remembering anything. The ancient lady says that because she saved him, he must leave via an isthmus before the island sinks underwater.

Next Anodos finds himself with two brothers who are forging armour and swords in order to fight three marauding giants living in a fortified stronghold. Anodos joins them in their fight, but they are ambushed by the giants unprepared. The brothers die in the fight, but Anodos lives, killing the giants and becoming a hero of the kingdom. He journeys to tell a woman whom one of the brothers loved of the brothers' death, but along the way is captured by a manifestation of his shadow and imprisoned. Anodos escapes by the song of a woman whom he had met before in Fairy Land, and he is not troubled by his shadow again.

Anodos again encounters Sir Percivale, becoming his squire. They come upon a cult of worshipers doing an unknown evil to a select few. Anodos decides to try to stop the ritual. He destroys the worshippers' idol, exposing a dark opening out of which a monster rushes to attack him. He kills the monster but is killed in the struggle as well. He floats as a spirit for a time before awakening alive on Earth, retaining the memory of his experiences in Fairy Land. His sisters inform him that he had only been gone 21 days, despite his seemingly long journey.

== Style ==
The novel is presented in a fragmentary, stream-of-consciousness style, designed to evoke the experience of dreaming. Significantly, only the hero Anodos is given a name, and the descriptions of his experience are kept deliberately vague. In this way, MacDonald is able to explore the adult unconscious mind that eludes logical patterns and separations.

== Publication history ==
Phantastes was first published by Smith, Elder & Co in London in 1858.

A two volume edition was published 1874 & 1878 by Daldy Isbister & Co.

The 1905 edition was illustrated by the Pre-Raphaelite painter Arthur Hughes.

The book was reprinted in paperback by Ballantine Books as the fourteenth volume of the Ballantine Adult Fantasy series in 1970.

== Reception ==
C. S. Lewis wrote of his first reading of Phantastes at age sixteen, "That night my imagination was, in a certain sense, baptized; the rest of me[,] not unnaturally, took longer. I had not the faintest notion what I had let myself in for by buying Phantastes."

J. R. R. Tolkien mentioned MacDonald in his essay "On Fairy-Stories".

The Ballantine Adult Fantasy series editor Lin Carter wrote that "MacDonald, frankly, had no ear for writing verses at all, and the intrusion of his saccharine rhymes injured, rather than enhanced, the strength and clearness of the book." He omitted almost all MacDonald's songs and poems from the 1970 reprint.

In 2020, UK singer/songwriter and guitarist Nick Harper released the album Phantastes, which was partly inspired by MacDonald's book. Harper said its story mirrored his teenage years and his first kiss with his now-wife in 1982. Harper also narrated a 2021 Phantastes audiobook which includes songs written by Harper using MacDonald's lyrics from the book.
