= Ballantine Adult Fantasy series =

1969–1974 Ballantine Books imprint

Imaginary Worlds by Lin Carter, Ballantine Books, 1973

The Ballantine Adult Fantasy series was an imprint of American publisher Ballantine Books. Launched in 1969 (presumably in response to the growing popularity of Tolkien's works), the series reissued a number of works of fantasy literature which were out of print or dispersed in back issues of pulp magazines (or otherwise not easily available in the United States), in cheap paperback form—including works by authors such as James Branch Cabell, Lord Dunsany, Ernest Bramah, Hope Mirrlees, and William Morris. The series lasted until 1974.

Envisioned by the husband-and-wife team of Ian and Betty Ballantine, and edited by Lin Carter, it featured cover art by illustrators such as Gervasio Gallardo, Robert LoGrippo, David McCall Johnston, and Bob Pepper. The agreement signed between the Ballantines and Carter on November 22, 1968, launched the project. In addition to the reprints comprising the bulk of the series, some new fantasy works were published as well as a number of original collections and anthologies put together by Carter, and Imaginary Worlds, his general history of the modern fantasy genre.

The series was never considered a money-maker for Ballantine, although the re-issue of several of its titles both before and after the series' demise shows that a number of individual works were considered successful. The Ballantines supported the series as long as they remained the publishers of Ballantine Books, but with their sale of the company to Random House in 1973 support from the top was no longer forthcoming, and in 1974, with the end of the Ballantines' involvement in the company they had founded, the series was terminated.

After the termination of the Adult Fantasy series, Ballantine continued to publish fantasy but concentrated primarily on new titles, with the older works it continued to issue being those with proven track records. In 1977, both its fantasy and science fiction lines were relaunched under the Del Rey Books imprint, under the editorship of Lester and Judy-Lynn del Rey. Carter continued his promotion of the fantasy genre in a new line of annual anthologies from DAW Books, The Year's Best Fantasy Stories, also beginning in 1975. Meanwhile, the series' lapsed mission of restoring classic works of fantasy to print had been taken up on a more limited basis by the Newcastle Forgotten Fantasy Library, launched in 1973.

== The series ==
All books in the "series proper" bore a distinctive Unicorn's Head colophon on the cover and included an introduction by Carter.

=== Precursors, August 1965 to April 1969 ===
Ballantine published these fantasies and fantasy criticism before hiring Carter as consultant. Some were labeled "A Ballantine Adult Fantasy" on the first Ballantine cover. Later reprints of some bore the Unicorn's Head colophon.

1. The Hobbit, J. R. R. Tolkien (August 1965)
2. The Fellowship of the Ring, J. R. R. Tolkien (October 1965)
3. The Two Towers, J. R. R. Tolkien (October 1965)
4. The Return of the King, J. R. R. Tolkien (December 1965)
5. The Tolkien Reader, J. R. R. Tolkien (September 1966)
6. The Worm Ouroboros, E. R. Eddison (April 1967, later reprinted (5th) with colophon)
7. Mistress of Mistresses, E. R. Eddison (August 1967)
8. A Fish Dinner in Memison, E. R. Eddison (February 1968)
9. The Road Goes Ever On, J. R. R. Tolkien and Donald Swann (October 1968)
10. Titus Groan, Mervyn Peake (October 1968; later reprinted (5th) with colophon)
11. Gormenghast, Mervyn Peake (October 1968; later reprinted (5th) with colophon)
12. Titus Alone, Mervyn Peake (October 1968; later reprinted (4th & 5th) with colophon)
13. A Voyage to Arcturus, David Lindsay (November 1968; later reprinted (2nd & 3rd) with colophon)
14. The Last Unicorn, Peter S. Beagle (February 1969, with "A Ballantine Adult Fantasy" on the cover; later reprinted with colophon)
15. A Fine and Private Place, Peter S. Beagle (February 1969, with "A Ballantine Adult Fantasy" on the cover of the first two printings)
16. Smith of Wootton Major and Farmer Giles of Ham, J. R. R. Tolkien (March 1969)
17. Tolkien: A Look Behind "The Lord of the Rings", Lin Carter (March 1969)
18. The Mezentian Gate, E. R. Eddison (April 1969, with "A Ballantine Adult Fantasy" on the cover)

=== The series proper, May 1969 to April 1974 ===
Volumes published as part of the series, based on a listing by Lin Carter in Imaginary Worlds: the Art of Fantasy with the addition of books new to Ballantine published under the Unicorn's Head colophon thereafter. In Carter's list, the books were numbered in the order of their publication; subsequent numbers supplied on the same basis. These numbers do not appear on the books themselves.

1. The Blue Star, Fletcher Pratt (May 1969) (#01602)
2. The King of Elfland's Daughter, Lord Dunsany (June 1969) (#01628)
3. The Wood Beyond the World, William Morris (July 1969) (#01652)
4. The Silver Stallion, James Branch Cabell (August 1969) (#01678)
5. Lilith, George MacDonald (September 1969) (#01711)
6. Dragons, Elves, and Heroes, Lin Carter, ed. (October 1969) (#01731)
7. The Young Magicians, Lin Carter, ed. (October 1969) (#01730)
8. Figures of Earth, James Branch Cabell (November 1969) (#01763)
9. The Sorcerer's Ship, Hannes Bok (December 1969) (#01795)
10. Land of Unreason, Fletcher Pratt and L. Sprague de Camp (January 1970) (#01814)
11. The High Place, James Branch Cabell (February 1970) (#01855-9)
12. Lud-in-the-Mist, Hope Mirrlees (March 1970) (#01880-X)
13. At the Edge of the World, Lord Dunsany (March 1970) (#01879-6)
14. Phantastes, George MacDonald (April 1970) (#01902-4)
15. The Dream-Quest of Unknown Kadath, H. P. Lovecraft (May 1970) (#01923-7)
16. Zothique, Clark Ashton Smith (June 1970) (#01938-5)
17. The Shaving of Shagpat, George Meredith (July 1970) (#01958-X)
18. The Island of the Mighty, Evangeline Walton (July 1970) (#01959-8)
19. Deryni Rising, Katherine Kurtz (August 1970) (#01981-4)
20. The Well at the World's End, Vol. 1, William Morris (August 1970) (#01982-2)
21. The Well at the World's End, Vol. 2, William Morris (September 1970) (#02015-4)
22. Golden Cities, Far, Lin Carter, ed. (October 1970) (#02045-6)
23. Beyond the Golden Stair, Hannes Bok (November 1970) (#02093-6)
24. The Broken Sword, Poul Anderson (January 1971) (#02107-X)
25. The Boats of the "Glen Carrig", William Hope Hodgson (February 1971) (#02145-2)
26. The Doom that Came to Sarnath and Other Stories, H. P. Lovecraft (February 1971) (#02146)
27. Something About Eve, James Branch Cabell (March 1971) (#02067-7)
28. Red Moon and Black Mountain, Joy Chant (March 1971) (#02178-9)
29. Hyperborea, Clark Ashton Smith (April 1971) (#02206-8)
30. Don Rodriguez: Chronicles of Shadow Valley, Lord Dunsany (May 1971) (#02244-0)
31. Vathek, William Beckford (June 1971) (#02279-3)
32. The Man Who Was Thursday, G. K. Chesterton (July 1971) (#02305-6)
33. The Children of Llyr, Evangeline Walton (August 1971) (#02332-3)
34. The Cream of the Jest, James Branch Cabell (September 1971) (#02364-1)
35. New Worlds for Old, Lin Carter, ed. (September 1971) (#02365-X)
36. The Spawn of Cthulhu, Lin Carter, ed. (October 1971) (#02394-3)
37. Double Phoenix, Edmund Cooper and Roger Lancelyn Green (November 1971) (#02420-6)
38. The Water of the Wondrous Isles, William Morris (November 1971) (#02421-4)
39. Khaled, F. Marion Crawford (December 1971) (#02446-X)
40. The World's Desire, H. Rider Haggard and Andrew Lang (January 1972) (#02467-2)
41. Xiccarph, Clark Ashton Smith (February 1972) (#02501-6)
42. The Lost Continent, C. J. Cutcliffe Hyne (February 1972) (#02502-4)
43. Discoveries in Fantasy, Lin Carter, ed. (March 1972) (#02546-6)
44. Domnei: A Comedy of Woman-Worship, James Branch Cabell (March 1972) (#02545-8)
45. Kai Lung's Golden Hours, Ernest Bramah (April 1972) (#02574-1)
46. Deryni Checkmate, Katherine Kurtz (May 1972) (#02598-9)
47. Beyond the Fields We Know, Lord Dunsany (May 1972) (#02599-7)
48. The Three Impostors, Arthur Machen (June 1972) (#02643-8)
49. The Night Land, Vol. 1, William Hope Hodgson (July 1972) (#02669-1)
50. The Night Land, Vol. 2, William Hope Hodgson (July 1972) (#02670-5)
51. The Song of Rhiannon, Evangeline Walton (August 1972) (#02773-6)
52. Great Short Novels of Adult Fantasy I, Lin Carter, ed. (September 1972) (#02789-2)
53. Evenor, George MacDonald (November 1972) (#02874)
54. Orlando Furioso: The Ring of Angelica, Volume 1, Ludovico Ariosto, translated by Richard Hodgens (January 1973) (#03057-5)
55. The Charwoman's Shadow, Lord Dunsany (February 1973) (#03085-0)
56. Great Short Novels of Adult Fantasy Volume II, Lin Carter, ed. (March 1973) (#03162-8)
57. The Sundering Flood, William Morris (May 1973) (#03261-6)
58. Imaginary Worlds: the Art of Fantasy, Lin Carter (June 1973) (#03309-4)
59. Poseidonis, Clark Ashton Smith (July 1973) (#03353-1)
60. Excalibur, Sanders Anne Laubenthal (August 1973) (#23416-2)
61. High Deryni, Katherine Kurtz (September 1973) (#23485-5)
62. Hrolf Kraki's Saga, Poul Anderson (October 1973) (#23562-2)
63. The People of the Mist, H. Rider Haggard (December 1973) (#23660-2)
64. Kai Lung Unrolls His Mat, Ernest Bramah (February 1974) (#023787-0)
65. Over the Hills and Far Away, Lord Dunsany (April 1974) (#023886-9)

=== Leftovers, June to November 1974 ===
Two volumes published after retirement of the Unicorn's Head colophon were evidently intended for the series. The first has a Carter introduction and the second completes a set of four begun under his editorship.

1. Merlin's Ring, H. Warner Munn (June 1974)
2. Prince of Annwn, Evangeline Walton (November 1974)

=== Other works considered by Carter for inclusion in the series ===
Carter intended to reissue or compile these books for the series, according to statements in his introductions to other books in the series and lists discovered among his effects after his death or elsewhere. A few were later issued in the Newcastle Forgotten Fantasy Library, a fantasy revival series similar to the Ballantine Adult Fantasy series published between 1973 and 1980.

1. The Nightmare Has Triplets, James Branch Cabell
2. The Elder Gods, John Campbell (combined with Kuttner's City of Sorcerers, included in a list of "recent" series titles in The Man Who Was Thursday but not in fact issued)
3. Short Stories, Donald Corley
4. The Revolt of the Angels, Anatole France
5. Thaïs, Anatole France
6. The Twilight of the Gods and Other Tales, Richard Garnett
7. One of Cleopatra's Nights, Théophile Gautier
8. Short Stories, David H. Keller
9. City of Sorcerers, Henry Kuttner (combined with Campbell's The Elder Gods, included in a list of "recent" series titles in The Man Who Was Thursday but not in fact issued). City of Sorcerers is an alternate title for the Kuttner novella "Lands of the Earthquake"
10. Child Christopher and Goldilind the Fair, William Morris (NFFL edition, April 1977)
11. The Roots of the Mountains, William Morris (NFFL edition, April 1979)
12. A Tale of the House of the Wolfings and All the Kindreds of the Mark, William Morris (NFFL edition, April 1978)
13. The Story of the Glittering Plain, William Morris (NFFL edition, September 1973)
14. Arachne, Eden Phillpotts
15. Circe's Island, Eden Phillpotts
16. Evander, Eden Phillpotts
17. Living Prophets, Eden Phillpotts
18. Lycanthrope, Eden Phillpotts
19. One Thing and Another, Eden Phillpotts
20. Saurus, Eden Phillpotts
21. The Thing at Their Heels, Eden Phillpotts
22. The Treasure of Typhon, Eden Phillpotts
23. Averoigne, Clark Ashton Smith
24. Malneant, Clark Ashton Smith
25. The Nightmare and Other Tales of Dark Fantasy, Francis Stevens
26. Zadig, and Other Marvels, Voltaire
