= Gervasio Gallardo =

Spanish artist and illustrator (1934–2023)

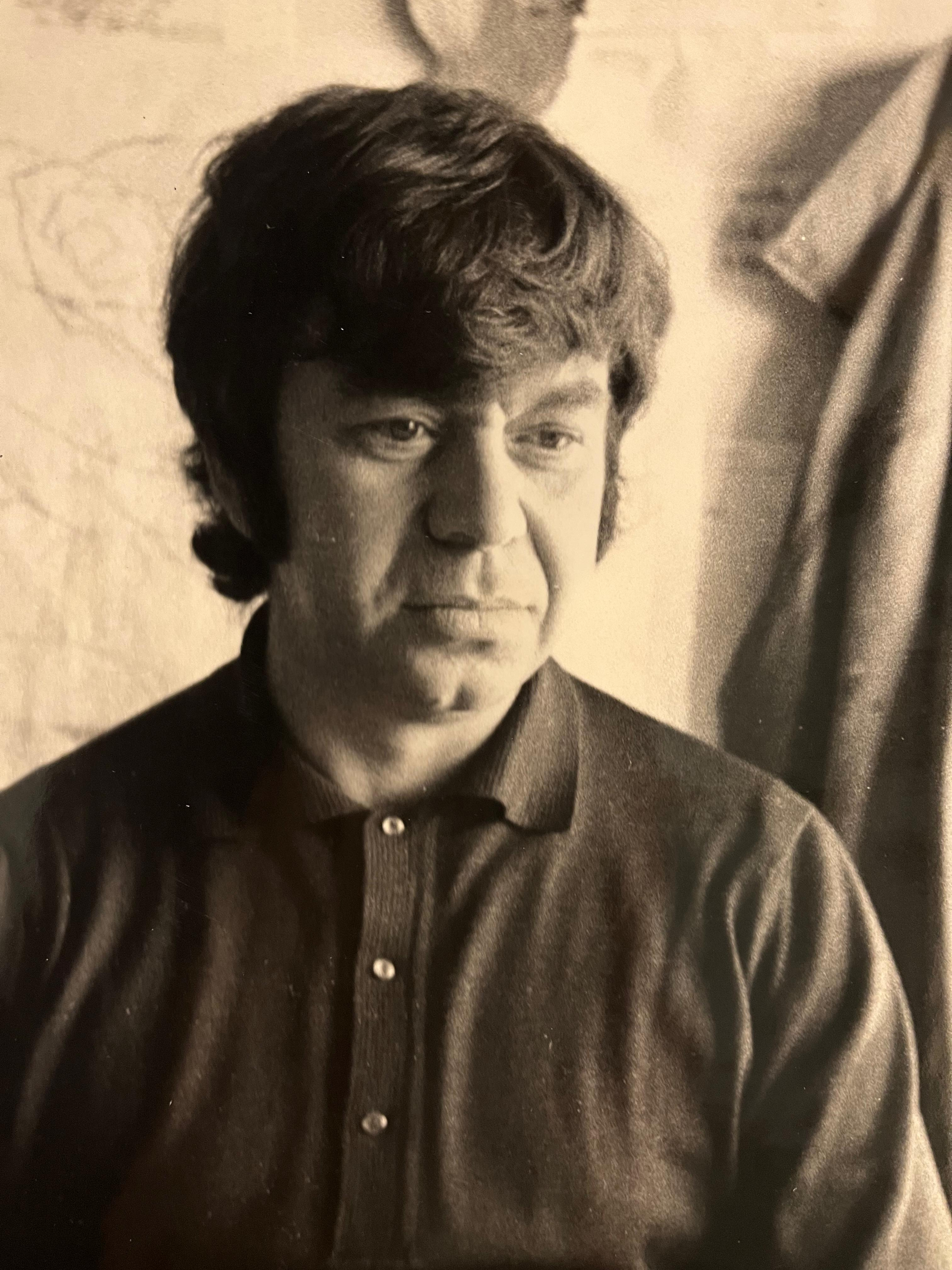
- Born: Gervasio Gallardo Villasenor; 5 June 1934; Barcelona, Spain
- Died: 24 June 2023 (aged 89)
- Known for: Painting

Gervasio Gallardo (5 June 1934 – 24 June 2023) was a Spanish artist and illustrator. He has produced numerous of surreal paintings and book covers, for many science-fiction and fantasy authors.

== Life and career ==
Born at Barcelona, Gallardo studied in Spain, working for several Spanish advertising agencies, before moving to Munich, Germany in 1959. He spent four years working with the Delpire Agency in Paris before traveling to the United States in 1963. There, he met Frank and Jeff Lavaty, who represent his work to this day.

In 1969, he was commissioned by Ballantine Books to create cover art for their Ballantine Adult Fantasy series. He went on to be the most prolific of their cover artists, creating a total of twenty-nine. Since then, he has created at least eighteen covers for other authors, including producing all of the artwork for his own release: The Fantastic World of Gervasio Gallardo. Eventually Gallardo returned to Barcelona to set up a studio. In 1977, 1978 and 1979 Gervasio Gallardo was represented at the International Art Fair of Basel by Sala Gaudí art gallery, where he exhibited individually in 1976 and 1978 and which today has a large part of his work.

Gallardo won numerous awards within Europe and the United States, and has exhibited his work in Paris, Barcelona, and the United States.

Gallardo died on 24 June 2023, at the age of 89.

== Works ==
Gallardo's covers include works by:

- Peter S. Beagle
- George MacDonald
- Hope Mirrlees
- H. P. Lovecraft
- Hannes Bok
- G. K. Chesterton
- Lin Carter
- Edmund Cooper and Roger Lancelyn Green
- F. Marion Crawford
- Lord Dunsany
- Clark Ashton Smith
- Sanders Anne Laubenthal
- H. Warner Munn
- William Morris

== Sources ==
- Ballantine Adult Fantasy Series at Nightfall Books - Supernatural, Horror, and Fantasy Fiction Prismatrix, Inc.
- Ballantine Adult Fantasy skwishmi.com
- Is It Too Early for Some Grand Marnier? Mark D. Ruffner, November 5, 2010.
- Gervasio Gallardo: Painting Wendy Campbell, April 16, 2010 cites The Fantastic World of Gervasio Gallardo Gervasio Gallardo, Bantam, Paperback. ISBN 978-0-553-01037-4.
