= In the King's Service (disambiguation) =

In the King's Service is a 2003 historical fantasy novel by Katherine Kurtz.

In the King's Service may also refer to:

- In the King's Service, a romance novel by Margaret Moore
- In the King's Service, a 1915 film directed by Tom Santschi

== See also ==
- The excuse of the King's service or essoin de servico regis, historical concept in English Law
