= Zoe Morgan =

Zoe Morgan may refer to:

- Zoe Morgan, character in the television series Hunted
- Zoe Morgan, character in the novel In the King's Service
- Zoe Morgan, character in the television series Person of Interest
