= Childe Morgan =

2006 novel by Katherine Kurtz

- Hardcover Edition
- Author: Katherine Kurtz
- Cover artist: Matt Stawicki
- Language: English
- Series: The Childe Morgan Trilogy
- Genre: Fantasy
- Publisher: Ace Books
- Publication date: 5 December 2006
- Publication place: United States
- Media type: Print (hardcover)
- Pages: 288 (first edition, hardcover)
- ISBN: 0-441-01282-5 (first edition, hardcover)
- OCLC: 69332183
- Dewey Decimal: 813/.54 22
- LC Class: PS3561.U69 C47 2006
- Preceded by: In the King's Service
- Followed by: The King's Deryni

Childe Morgan is a fantasy novel by American writer Katherine Kurtz. It was published by Ace Books on December 5, 2006. It is the fifteenth of Kurtz's Deryni novels to be published, the second book in the fifth Deryni trilogy, the Childe Morgan trilogy. The events of this trilogy are a direct prequel to the first Deryni trilogy, the Chronicles of the Deryni.

== Plot introduction ==
The novel is set in the land of Gwynedd, one of the fictional Eleven Kingdoms. Gwynedd itself is a medieval kingdom similar to the British Isles of the 11th century, with a powerful Holy Church (based on the Roman Catholic Church), and a feudal government ruled by a hereditary monarchy. The population of Gwynedd includes both humans and Deryni, a race of people with inherent psychic and magical abilities who have been persecuted and suppressed for almost two centuries. The novel details the early life of Alaric Morgan, a half-Deryni child chosen by King Donal Blaine Haldane to protect the royal legacy of arcane magic. However, Alaric is scorned by both humans and Deryni for his heritage, some of whom will stop at nothing to destroy the young boy.

== Plot summary ==
The events of Childe Morgan span a period of approximately two and a half years, from late December 1093 to late March 1096. In the Gwyneddan capital of Rhemuth, Sir Kenneth Morgan and his wife, Lady Alyce de Corwyn, bring their son, Alaric Morgan, to the court of King Donal Blaine Haldane. At Twelfth Night Court in January 1094, Kenneth is created Earl of Lendour and named primary regent for Alaric's future inheritance of the Duchy of Corwyn. After court, the Camberian Council discusses the emerging danger posed by Zachris Pomeroy, a rogue Deryni who is encouraging the current Festillic Pretender to press his claim for the throne of Gwynedd.

In the spring, the Morgan family travels through Lendour and Corwyn while Kenneth acquaints himself with his new lands and reviews the regency of his son in Corwyn. While returning to Rhemuth in late summer, they encounter the remains of a Deryni who was burned at the stake by the people of a small village. The incident is a sobering and disquieting reminder of the remaining antagonism that many people in Gwynedd still bear toward Deryni. As the next Twelfth Night Court approaches several months later, Donal receives word of the death of the Crown Prince of Torenth. Concerned about Zachris' prior involvement with the dead prince, the Camberian Council investigates the matter, but is unable to discover any new or useful information.

In June 1095, Alyce and Kenneth assist the king in a brief magical ritual. With Donal's eldest son and heir, Prince Brion, attaining his legal majority on his fourteenth birthday, Donal takes the opportunity to prepare his son's mind for the eventual assumption of the full Haldane potential. Afterwards, Alyce and Alaric travel to Culdi, where the pregnant Alyce plans to spend the summer in the company of her secret twin sister, Countess Vera McLain of Kierney. The day after Alaric's fourth birthday, at the king's request, Alyce and Vera conduct an ancient Deryni ritual to bestow magical names upon their children. The ritual is briefly interrupted by the clandestine arrival of the king himself, who takes an active part in Alaric's ritual and further binds the boy to his plans. Alyce and Vera relocate to Kenneth's familial estates in October, and their close proximity to Rhemuth allows Donal to make another surprise visit in November. Heart-broken by the accidental death of his youngest son, Prince Jathan, Donal sets a final set of mental triggers in young Alaric to enable the boy to activate Prince Brion's full Haldane powers in the future. However, due to Alaric's youth, Donal also gives similar power to Alyce, allowing her to activate his heir's abilities if necessary. During the return to Rhemuth, Donal falls ill, and his condition quickly deteriorates despite the best efforts of the royal physicians. King Donal Blaine Haldane dies on November 14, 1095.

Alyce delivers her second child, a daughter named Bronwyn, on December 12, but she fails to regain her strength afterwards. Nevertheless, she is determined to activate Brion's powers as quickly as possible, and she orders Kenneth to bring the new king to her. Kenneth reluctantly complies, but Alyce, in her weakened state, is unable to fully activate Brion's arcane abilities. The strain of the attempt is ultimately too much for her, and Lady Alyce de Corwyn de Morgan dies in the arms of her husband on December 29, 1095.

After Alyce's funeral, Kenneth and Alaric return to Rhemuth for Brion's coronation, but the ceremony is delayed by the death of the Archbishop of Valoret. The remaining bishops travel to Valoret to elect their new leader, a process that is finally completed in early March. Brion decides to travel to Valoret to meet the new archbishop, despite concerns for his safety by several of his ministers. Additionally, the Camberian Council has become increasingly concerned that Zachris Pomeroy may attempt to kill the new king. After arriving at Valoret and witnessing the enthronement of the new archbishop, an assassination plot is discovered by Jamyl Arilan, a Deryni secretly working for the Camberian Council. Jamyl is forced to reveal himself to Kenneth, and the two successfully disrupt the plot before Brion can be harmed. During a battle in the cathedral itself, Kenneth is saved from Zachris' magic by the timely intervention of Sir Sé Trelawney, a mysterious childhood friend of Alyce's who kills the rogue Deryni with a single arrow. Afterwards, Kenneth tells nobody of Jamyl's Deryni heritage or Sé's presence in Valoret. Upon returning to Rhemuth, the final preparations for the coronation are made, and King Brion Haldane is crowned on March 24, 1096. Sé briefly appears to pledge his service to Brion, and Kenneth once again dedicates himself and his son to the protection of the Haldane line.

== Characters ==
- King Donal Blaine Haldane: King of Gwynedd
- Queen Richeldis MacFaolan-Gruffud: Queen of Gwynedd, wife of King Donal Blaine, mother of Prince Brion
- Prince Brion Haldane: Prince of Gwynedd, eldest son and heir of King Donal Blaine and Queen Richeldis
- Prince Nigel Haldane: Prince of Gwynedd, second surviving son of King Donal and Queen Richeldis, younger brother of Prince Brion
- Prince Richard Haldane: Prince of Gwynedd, Duke of Carthmoor, Earl of Culdi, younger half-brother of King Donal, uncle of Prince Brion and Prince Nigel
- Lady Alyce de Corwyn de Morgan: heiress to the Duchy of Corwyn, wife of Kenneth Morgan, mother of Alaric Morgan
- Earl Kenneth Morgan: Earl of Lendour, aide to King Donal Blaine, husband of Alyce de Corwyn, father of Alaric Morgan
- Lord Alaric Morgan: hereditary Duke of Corwyn, son of Kenneth Morgan and Alyce de Corwyn, cousin of Duncan McLain
- Lady Zoë Morgan: eldest daughter of Kenneth Morgan, stepdaughter of Alyce de Corwyn
- Countess Vera (de Corwyn) McLain: wife of Earl Jared McLain of Kierney, mother of Duncan McLain, secret twin sister of Lady Alyce de Corwyn
- Lord Duncan McLain: son of Earl Jared McLain and Countess Vera McLain, cousin of Alaric Morgan
- Sir Sé Trelawney: childhood friend of Lady Alyce de Corwyn, fully avowed Knight of the Anvil
- Lord Michon de Courcy: member of the Camberian Council
- Lord Seisyll Arilan: member of King Brion's council and member of the Camberian Council, uncle of Jamyl Arilan
- Master Jamyl Arilan: squire to King Donal and Prince Brion, nephew of Seisyll Arilan
- Zachris Pomeroy: friend and foster brother of Prince Hogan Furstán

== Release details ==
- 2006, USA, Ace Books ISBN 0-441-01282-5, Pub date 5 December 2006, Hardcover (first edition)
