= The King's Justice =

1985 novel by Katherine Kurtz

- Paperback edition
- Author: Katherine Kurtz
- Cover artist: Darrell K. Sweet
- Language: English
- Series: The Histories of King Kelson
- Genre: Fantasy
- Publisher: Del Rey Books
- Publication date: 1985
- Publication place: United States
- Media type: Print (hardback & paperback)
- Pages: 337 (first edition, hardcover)
- ISBN: 0-345-31825-0 (first edition, hardcover)
- OCLC: 11915449
- Dewey Decimal: 813/.54 19
- LC Class: PS3561.U69 K5 1985
- Preceded by: The Bishop's Heir
- Followed by: The Quest for Saint Camber

The King's Justice is a historical fantasy novel by American-born author Katherine Kurtz. It was first published by Del Rey Books in 1985. It was the eighth of Kurtz' Deryni novels to be published, and the second book in her third Deryni trilogy, The Histories of King Kelson. Although The Legends of Camber of Culdi trilogy was published immediately prior to the Histories trilogy, the Histories trilogy is a direct sequel to Kurtz' first Deryni series, The Chronicles of the Deryni.

== Plot introduction ==
The novel is set in the land of Gwynedd, one of the fictional Eleven Kingdoms. Gwynedd itself is a medieval kingdom similar to the British Isles of the 12th century, with a powerful Holy Church (based on the Roman Catholic Church), and a feudal government ruled by a hereditary monarchy. The population of Gwynedd includes both humans and Deryni, a race of people with inherent physic and magical abilities who have been brutally persecuted and suppressed for over two centuries. The novel begins four months after the conclusion of The Bishop's Heir, and the plot details the continuing efforts of King Kelson Haldane to defeat the combined forces of a political adversary and a fanatical religious enemy.

== Plot summary ==
The plot of The King's Justice spans a period of two months, from May 1124 to July 1124. The novel begins as King Kelson Haldane is making final preparations to launch a military campaign into the province of Meara. Although Meara has been a part of Gwynedd for over a century, a descendant of the ancient Mearan rulers, Caitrin Quinnell, has gathered an army and risen against Kelson to secure her place as queen of an independent and sovereign Meara. Additionally, Caitrin has allied herself with Edmund Loris, the rabidly anti-Deryni former-Archbishop who has managed to escape from his imprisonment.

Kelson plans to set the Haldane potential in his uncle, Prince Nigel Haldane, before his departure, ensuring that his family's legacy of magic will not perish if Kelson should not survive the war. However, Kelson's plan deeply concerns the Camberian Council, who has long believed that multiple Haldanes cannot wield the Haldane magic simultaneously. Further complicating matters is the ill-timed return of Kelson's mother, Queen Jehana, whose anti-Deryni sentiments cause considerable friction with her son. Nonetheless, Kelson carries through with his plan and sets the Haldane potential in his uncle. The following day, Kelson sends off the first half of his army, placing it under the command of Bishop Duncan McLain and Earl Dhugal MacArdry.

As Caitrin's forces prepare to do battle with Kelson's armies, Kelson receives the homage of King Liam Lajos II Furstán of Torenth, who travels to Rhemuth to acknowledge Kelson as Overlord of Torenth. However, Kelson decides to take both Liam and his mother as honorable hostages, ensuring that Torenth will make no aggressive move against Gwynedd while Kelson is occupied with the Mearan situation. Shortly thereafter, Kelson and Duke Alaric Morgan lead the second half of the royal army out from Rhemuth to meet the Mearan rebels.

Over the following weeks, the Gwyneddan armies attempt to hunt down and destroy the Mearan forces. In the north, Loris and Sicard MacArdry, Caitrin's husband, continually elude Duncan and Dhugal. Meanwhile, in the south, Kelson and Morgan chase after Caitrin's son, Prince Ithel, whose own acts of rape and destruction have fueled Kelson's anger. Kelson eventually succeeds in capturing Ithel, who is summarily executed for his crimes. On the same day, Sicard and Loris lure the northern Gwyneddan army into a trap. Realizing that Loris is determined to capture him, Duncan orders Dhugal to flee the battle, hoping that the rest of the army will survive. Dhugal manages to escape the battle, but Duncan is defeated and captured. In Rhemuth, Jehana suffers a crisis of conscience when her own Deryni powers enable her to discover a Torenthi plot to assassinate Nigel. Jehana finally decides to warn Nigel, and the assassination attempt is foiled.

Loris tortures Duncan horribly, mutilating the Deryni bishop in an attempt to force him to confess to charges of heresy. That night, Dhugal succeeds in contacting Kelson and informs the king of Duncan's plight. As Kelson's army marches through the night to rescue their comrades, Loris prepares to burn Duncan at the stake. However, Duncan's execution is interrupted by the arrival of Kelson's army. Both Kelson and Morgan use their Deryni powers to protect Duncan, but it is ultimately Dhugal who rescues the bishop. Kelson corners Sicard, but the Pretender's husband refuses to surrender. Unwilling to allow Sicard's defiance to cost additional lives, Kelson kills Sicard with a single arrow. The remaining Mearan soldiers throw down their arms, and the Gwyneddan army is victorious.

After several days of resting the army, Kelson leads his host to Laas, the Mearan city to which Caitrin has fled. Kelson demands the Pretender's surrender, and Dhugal convinces his aunt to accede to the king's terms. After Kelson's army takes possession of the city, Loris and his aide are executed for their crimes, and Kelson reluctantly orders the execution of the last member of Caitrin's family, Prince Judhael. With the Pretender's bloodline extinguished and her army defeated, Kelson secures his authority over the land of Meara.

== Characters ==
- King Kelson Haldane: King of Gwynedd
- Duke Alaric Morgan: Duke of Corwyn, King's Champion, Lord General of the Royal Armies, cousin of Duncan McLain, husband of Richenda of Rheljan
- Bishop Duncan McLain: Auxiliary Bishop of Rhemuth, Duke of Cassan, Earl of Kierney, father of Dhugal MacArdry, cousin of Alaric Morgan
- Earl Dhugal MacArdry: Earl of Transha, nephew of Sicard MacArdry
- Prince Nigel Haldane: Prince Regent of Gwynedd, Duke of Carthmoor, uncle of King Kelson, father of Conall Haldane
- Bishop Denis Arilan: Bishop of Dhassa, member of the Camberian Council
- Duchess Richenda of Rheljan: Duchess of Corwyn, wife of Alaric Morgan
- Queen Jehana: Dowager Queen of Gwynedd, mother of King Kelson
- Lady Caitrin Quinnell: Pretender of Meara, wife of Sicard MacArdry
- Lord Sicard MacArdry: husband of Caitrin Quinnell, uncle of Dhugal MacArdry
- Prince Ithel MacArdry Quinnell: eldest son and heir of the Mearan Pretender
- Archbishop Edmund Loris: former Archbishop of Valoret
- Monsignor Lawrence Gorony: aide to Archbishop Loris
- Baron Brice de Paor: Baron of Trurill
- Prince Conall Haldane: Prince of Gwynedd, eldest son and heir of Nigel Haldane, cousin of King Kelson
- Lady Rothana of Nur Hallaj: a novice at St. Brigid's Abbey and distant cousin of Richenda
- Tiercel de Claron: member of the Camberian Council
- Prince Judhael MacDonald Quinnell: Prince of Meara, Bishop of Ratharkin, nephew of the Mearan Pretender

== Reception ==
Dave Langford reviewed The King's Justice for White Dwarf #79, and stated that "It's not only a King but an author who's matured, with the acceptance that it may be needful to execute an innocent man (a rebel rallying-point) or kill an enemy without giving him a chivalrous change (which might mean the whole war having to be fought again)."

=== Awards and nominations ===
In 1986, The King's Justice was ranked 6th in an annual poll of fantasy novels by Locus magazine readers, placing it between Jack Vance's The Green Pearl and Guy Gavriel Kay's The Summer Tree. The poll was won by Roger Zelazny for his novel, Trumps of Doom. (Kurtz and Zelazny were also finalists for the 1971 and 1973 Mythopoeic Fantasy Awards.) This was the highest ranking for any of Kurtz' Deryni novels on the annual poll, matching the sixth-place ranking of Kurtz' Camber the Heretic in the 1982 poll.

== Release details ==
- 1985, USA, Ballantine Books ISBN 0-345-31825-0, Hardcover (first edition)
- 1986, UK, Legend Books ISBN 0-09-945870-5, Pub date 17 April 1986, Paperback
- 1986, USA, Del Rey Books ISBN 0-345-33196-6, Pub date 12 July 1986, Paperback
