= The Harrowing of Gwynedd =

1989 novel by Katherine Kurtz

- Hardcover edition
- Author: Katherine Kurtz
- Cover artist: Michael Herring
- Language: English
- Series: The Heirs of Saint Camber
- Genre: Fantasy
- Publisher: Del Rey Books
- Publication date: 1989
- Publication place: United States
- Media type: Print (Paperback & Hardcover)
- Pages: 384 (first edition, hardcover)
- ISBN: 0-345-33259-8 (first edition, hardcover)
- OCLC: 18589190
- Dewey Decimal: 813/.54 19
- LC Class: PS3561.U69 H4 1989
- Preceded by: The Quest for Saint Camber (publication date), Camber the Heretic (literary chronology)
- Followed by: King Javan's Year

The Harrowing of Gwynedd is a historical fantasy novel by American-born author Katherine Kurtz. It was first published by Del Rey Books in 1989. It was the tenth of Kurtz' Deryni novels to be published, and the first book in her fourth Deryni trilogy, The Heirs of Saint Camber. Although the Heirs trilogy was the fourth Deryni series to be published, it is a direct sequel to the second trilogy, The Legends of Camber of Culdi.

== Plot introduction ==
The novel is set in the land of Gwynedd, one of the fictional Eleven Kingdoms. Gwynedd itself is a medieval kingdom similar to the British Isles of the 10th century, with a powerful Holy Church (based on the Roman Catholic Church), and a feudal government ruled by a hereditary monarchy. The population of Gwynedd includes both humans and Deryni, a race of people with inherent psychic and magical abilities who are being systematically persecuted by both the Crown and the Church. The novel begins two days after the conclusion of Camber the Heretic, as the Regents of young King Alroy Haldane continue their bloody suppression of Deryni throughout the realm. As the Deryni struggle to survive, the remaining members of the MacRorie family investigate the strange circumstances of their patriarch's apparent death.

== Plot summary ==
The plot of The Harrowing of Gwynedd spans seven months, from early January to early August 918. The novel begins as Father Joram MacRorie and his sister, Lady Evaine MacRorie Thuryn, discuss the recent death of their father, Camber MacRorie. As time passes and Camber's body shows no signs of decomposing, they are forced to consider the possibility that their father may not be truly dead. Evaine believes he attempted to work a final spell just before his death, but Joram wonders if Camber may truly be a saint.

Throughout Gwynedd, the Deryni attempt to flee to safety as the Regents of young King Alroy Haldane continue their violent suppression of Deryni across the kingdom. Desperate for any slim chance to save even a few of their people, the Camberian Council begins making final preparations for a dangerous deception. They plan to develop a new religious cult, led by their ally Revan, which will preach the possibility of washing away a Deryni's powers through ceremonial baptism. By placing a Deryni Healer who is capable of blocking Deryni powers within the cult, the Council hopes to remove the powers of willing Deryni subjects, thereby protecting them from the wrath of the Regents and the Church.

Meanwhile, in Valoret, the king's twin brother and heir, Prince Javan Haldane, strives to maintain the secret lines of communication with his Deryni allies. As Javan's own magical powers continue to grow and develop, he is well aware that the very powers he may need to survive may also result in his quick death if the Regents ever discover them. Nonetheless, he continues to funnel information to the Council and even assists Ansel MacRorie and Tavis O'Neill when they sneak into Valoret to block the faint Deryni powers of Ansel's immediate family.

Over the following months, Javan's strengthening powers enable him to mentally probe and influence his squire, his brother, and even Archbishop Hubert MacInnis. To further keep the attention of the Regents away from him, Javan convinces Hubert that he has a growing religious vocation, allowing him greater access to the archbishop's mind. The Royal Court moves from Valoret to Rhemuth, and Revan sets out to start his baptizer cult after finishing his final preparations with the Camberian Council. Evaine and Joram reveal the truth about Camber's supposed death to Dom Queron Kinevan, enlisting his aid in their efforts to restore their father from his limbo state. Evaine succeeds in establishing regular contact with Javan in Rhemuth, but most her time is spent researching ancient Deryni lore with Joram and Queron.

By early summer, Revan's baptizer cult is growing in size and popularity. To further convince Hubert that he is genuinely considering a religious life, Javan travels to Valoret to study with the archbishop. After Hubert's brother informs him of Revan's cult, the archbishop and the prince travel to the river to observe Revan's actions for themselves. Although two known Deryni are apparently stripped of their powers before their eyes, Hubert remains skeptical, even after both subjects are tested with merasha. Javan volunteers to submit to the ceremony, and proceeds to do so even after Hubert forbids him to do so. Hubert later has the prince flogged for his disobedience, but Javan once again uses his powers to manipulate Hubert's mind. Gambling that Hubert will not kill him as long as the archbishop believes he is serious about becoming a priest, Javan agrees to take temporary vows as a lay brother, hoping that a religious house will provide the protection and education he will need to survive until he comes of age.

After several important breakthroughs and discoveries, Evaine finally feels ready to attempt to free her father. She makes final preparations for the ritual, then briefly visits Javan to provide him with the subconscious knowledge of his magical Haldane heritage. Two days later, as Javan formally makes his vows, Evaine, Joram, and Queron attempt to free Camber from his stasis. In a powerful and mystical ritual, Evaine briefly leaves the mortal plane and communes with several higher beings. She discovers that Camber failed to work his last spell properly, forever trapping him in a state between life and death. Realizing that she must sacrifice herself to free her father, Evaine pours her very life energy into her father's spell, shifting Camber's soul into a state in which he may freely cross the boundaries of life and death. When the process is completed, Queron can only watch helplessly as Evaine's soul departs her dying body.

== Characters ==
- Lady Evaine MacRorie Thuryn: daughter of Camber MacRorie, sister of Joram MacRorie, widow of Rhys Thuryn, member of the Camberian Council
- Father Joram MacRorie: former Michaeline priest and knight, son of Camber MacRorie, brother of Evaine MacRorie Thuryn, member of the Camberian Council
- Dom Queron Kinevan: former Gabrilite Healer and priest, founder of the Servants of Saint Camber, member of the Camberian Council
- King Alroy Haldane: King of Gwynedd, elder twin brother of Prince Javan
- Prince Javan Haldane: Prince of Gwynedd, younger twin brother and heir of King Alroy
- Prince Rhys Michael Haldane: Prince of Gwynedd, youngest brother of King Alroy
- Lord Ansel MacRorie: grandson of Camber MacRorie, nephew of Evaine and Joram, member of the Camberian Council
- Lord Tavis O'Neill: former personal Healer to Prince Javan, member of the Camberian Council
- Earl Gregory MacDinan: former Earl of Ebor, father of Jesse MacGregor, member of the Camberian Council
- Lord Jesse MacGregor: son of Gregory MacDinan, member of the Camberian Council
- Archbishop Hubert MacInnis: Archbishop of Valoret and Primate of All Gwynedd, Lord Regent of Gwynedd, younger brother of Manfred MacInnis
- Earl Manfred MacInnis: Earl of Culdi, Lord Regent of Gwynedd, elder brother of Archbishop Hubert
- Earl Rhun von Horthy: Earl of Sheele, Baron of Horthness, Vice-Marshal of Gwynedd, Lord Regent of Gwynedd
- Earl Tammaron Fitz-Arthur: Lord Chancellor of Gwynedd, Lord Regent of Gwynedd
- Earl Murdoch: Earl of Carthane, Lord Regent of Gwynedd
- Master Revan: former tutor to the Thuryn family and leader of a pseudo-religious baptizer cult created by the Camberian Council
- Lord Oriel de Bourg: Healer in the forced service of Archbishop Hubert and the other Regents
- Lord Charlan Morgan: squire to Prince Javan

== Release details ==
- 1989, USA, Del Rey Books ISBN 0-345-33259-8, Hardcover (first edition)
- 1989, USA, Del Rey Books ISBN 0-345-36314-0, Paperback
- 1989, UK, Century Publishing ISBN 0-7126-3495-9, Pub date 14 December 1989, Hardcover
- 1989, UK, Legend Books ISBN 0-7126-3500-9, Pub date 14 December 1989, Paperback
- 1991, UK, Legend Books ISBN 0-09-971070-6, Pub date 3 January 1991, Paperback
