= The Bastard Prince =

1994 novel by Katherine Kurtz

- Paperback Edition
- Author: Katherine Kurtz
- Cover artist: Edwin Herder
- Language: English
- Series: The Heirs of Saint Camber
- Genre: Fantasy
- Publisher: Del Rey Books
- Publication date: 1994
- Publication place: United States
- Media type: Print (hardback & paperback)
- Pages: 421 (first edition, hardcover)
- ISBN: 0-345-33262-8 (first edition, hardcover)
- OCLC: 29638319
- Dewey Decimal: 813/.54 20
- LC Class: PS3561.U69 B37 1994
- Preceded by: King Javan's Year
- Followed by: King Kelson's Bride (next published), In the King's Service (literary chronology)

The Bastard Prince is a fantasy novel by American-born author Katherine Kurtz. It was first published by Del Rey Books in 1994. It was the twelfth of Kurtz' Deryni novels to be published, and the third book in her fourth Deryni trilogy, The Heirs of Saint Camber. Although the Heirs trilogy was the fourth Deryni series to be published, it is a direct sequel to the second trilogy, The Legends of Camber of Culdi. The next Deryni novel to be published, King Kelson's Bride, was a direct sequel to the Histories of King Kelson trilogy, but the internal literary chronology of the series was later continued in In the King's Service, the first book of the Childe Morgan trilogy.

== Plot introduction ==
The novel is set in the land of Gwynedd, one of the fictional Eleven Kingdoms. Gwynedd itself is a medieval kingdom similar to the British Isles of the 10th century, with a powerful Holy Church (based on the Roman Catholic Church), and a feudal government ruled by a hereditary monarchy. The population of Gwynedd includes both humans and Deryni, a race of people with inherent physic and magical abilities who are being systematically persecuted by both the Crown and the Church. The novel begins five and a half years after the conclusion of King Javan's Year, as a Deryni pretender leads his forces across the border to claim the crown of Gwynedd. Forced by his great lords to live as a puppet king since the death of his older brother, King Rhys Michael Haldane finally gets the opportunity to be a true king and defend his throne. However, the great lords may be even more dangerous than a foreign invader, and Rhys Michael must find a way to defeat both if he is to survive.

== Plot summary ==
The events of The Bastard Prince span a period of approximately six months, from late May to late December of 928. The novel begins after the invasion of Prince Marek Furstán-Festil, the bastard child of the last Deryni ruler of Gwynedd, King Imre, and his sister, Princess Ariella. Supported by his Torenthi relatives, Marek has occupied the town of Culliecairn and slain Earl Hrorik II of Eastmarch. Word of the invasion is quickly sent to Rhemuth, where King Rhys Michael Haldane has spent the first six years of his reign as an imprisoned puppet of his lords of state. When a Torenthi herald arrives at Rhemuth to challenge the king, the great lords realize that they must permit Rhys Michael to go to Eastmarch and personally respond to the invasion.

Disguised as one of Queen Michaela's serving maids, Rhysel Thuryn quickly learns of the king's plans to accompany his army to Eastmarch. Rhysel meets with members of the Camberian Council and attempts to convince them to activate the king's Haldane potential before he leaves the following day. Despite his own objections, Father Joram MacRorie, Rhysel's uncle, eventually agrees to her plan. That night, Joram and Tieg Thuryn, Rhysel's brother, infiltrate the castle and meet with the king. Tieg unblocks the Deryni powers of both Michaela and her brother, Sir Cathan Drummond, and Michaela then assists Tieg, Rhysel, and Joram in activating Rhys Michael's arcane powers. After the ritual, Joram and Tieg capture Master Dimitri, a Torenthi Deryni collaborator who has been working for the great lords. The Camberian Council alters Dimitri's mind with their own set of commands before returning him to Rhemuth.

The next day, Rhys Michael departs the capital with army, accompanied by Cathan, Earl Manfred MacInnis, Earl Rhun von Horthy, Lord Albertus, and Father Paulin Sinclair. Before departing the city, Constable Udaut is killed when Dimitri secretly uses his powers to spook Udaut's horse. Later on the journey, a swarm of bees mysteriously attacks the royal party and nearly kills Albertus. Several days later, Albertus questions Rhys Michael about the incidents, concerned about the rumored magical powers of the Haldane family. He orders Dimitri to probe the king's mind, but the Deryni is still under the compulsions of the Camberian Council. To protect the king, Dimitri kills Albertus and later allows himself to be implicated in the death. When Paulin attempts to confine Dimitri, he lashes out with his powers and destroys Paulin's mind before being overcome. Dimitri is tortured for several hours before he is killed by a mental death-trigger in his own mind.

The royal army arrives at Lochalyn the next day, where it is joined by the levies of Duke Graham of Claibourne, Earl Sighere of Marley, and Earl Corban Howell of Eastmarch. In a private conversation, Lady Sudrey, Hrorik's Deryni widow, offers Rhys Michael her support and the use of her limited powers. The following morning, Rhys Michael agrees to meet with Prince Miklos of Torenth, who claims to have led the invasion on Marek's behalf. Accompanied by Sudrey, the king parleys with Miklos briefly, but Miklos breaks the peace by attacking Sudrey. Rhys Michael uses his own powers to protect himself and kill Miklos, but Sudrey is killed in the battle and Rhys Michael is wounded when a horse steps on his hand. Afterwards, the king claims that it was Sudrey who used magic in the battle, and later realizes that Miklos' companion was actually Marek himself.

After Miklos' death, Marek withdraws his forces and returns to Torenth. Rhys Michael asks the northern lords to help him break free of the great lords, and Graham and Sighere agree to become Regents for the king's son, Prince Owain, if anything should happen to the king. Cathan prepares a codicil to the king's will, and all parties involved succeed in signing it without alerting Rhun or Manfred. The king departs for Rhemuth the next day, but the progress of the army is slowed by the worsening condition of his injury. The army is eventually forced to stop at Saint Ostrythe's Convent when the king becomes too ill to continue. Dom Queron Kinevan rushes to the king's side, but he does not arrive in time and Rhys Michael soon dies from poor medical treatment.

As the army returns to Rhemuth with Rhys Michael's body, the Camberian Council informs the northern lords of the king's death and offers their assistance in securing the rights of the new Regents. In Rhemuth, Cathan is drugged and imprisoned, but Michaela and Rhysel succeed in activating Owain's Haldane potential. Over the next several days, the northern lords ride toward Rhemuth, eventually arriving on the morning of Rhys Michael's funeral. Accompanied by Queron, Tieg, Ansel MacRorie, and a band of armed men, Graham and Sighere confront the great lords inside the royal tomb. Rhun kills Manfred and flees with Owain, while Earl Tammaron takes Michaela hostage. As Cathan pursues Rhun, Michaela uses her powers to slay Tammaron. Cathan catches Rhun atop a tower and the two engage in a brief fight before Rhun is killed.

Several months later, Michaela visits her husband's tomb in the royal crypt. Owain has been crowned as King of Gwynedd, and Cathan now serves on the Regency Council with her, Graham, and Sighere. Of the former Regents, only former Archbishop Hubert MacInnis remains alive, but he has been stripped of his office and imprisoned for his crimes. Although he did not live long enough to see it, Rhys Michael's actions succeeded in freeing the crown of Gwynedd for his heirs.

== Characters ==
- King Rhys Michael Haldane: King of Gwynedd
- Queen Michaela Drummond: Queen of Gwynedd, wife of King Rhys Michael, sister of Cathan Drummond, mother of Prince Owain
- Sir Cathan Drummond: aide to King Rhys Michael, brother of Queen Michaela
- Prince Owain Haldane: Prince of Gwynedd, eldest surviving son and heir of King Rhys Michael and Queen Michaela
- Lady Rhysel Thuryn: maid to Queen Michaela, sister of Tieg Thuryn, niece of Joram MacRorie
- Lord Tieg Thuryn: Healer, brother of Rhysel Thuryn, nephew of Joram MacRorie
- Father Joram MacRorie: former Michaeline priest and knight, son of Saint Camber, uncle of Rhysel and Tieg Thuryn, member of the Camberian Council
- Dom Queron Kinevan: former Gabrilite priest and Healer, founder of the Servants of Saint Camber, member of the Camberian Council
- Lord Ansel MacRorie: grandson of Saint Camber, nephew of Joram MacRorie, cousin of Rhysel and Tieg Thuryn, member of the Camberian Council
- Lord Jesse MacGregor: son of Earl Gregory, member of the Camberian Council
- Archbishop Hubert MacInnis: Archbishop of Valoret and Primate of All Gwynedd, younger brother of Manfred MacInnis
- Earl Manfred MacInnis: Earl of Culdi, elder brother of Archbishop Hubert
- Earl Rhun von Horthy: Earl of Sheele
- Earl Tammaron Fitz-Arthur: Lord Chancellor of Gwynedd
- Sir Fulk Fitz-Arthur: aide to King Rhys Michael, son of Earl Tammaron
- Father Paulin Sinclair: Vicar General of the Custodes Fidei, brother of Albertus
- Lord Albertus: Grand Master of the Equites Custodum Fidei, Earl Marshal of Gwynedd
- Master Dimitri: Torenthi Deryni collaborator
- Prince Marek Furstán-Festil: the Festillic Pretender, bastard son of King Imre and Princess Ariella, brother-in-law of Prince Miklos
- Prince Miklos von Furstán: Prince of Torenth, younger brother of King Arion, brother-in-law of Prince Marek
- Duke Graham MacEwan: Duke of Claibourne
- Earl Sighere: Earl of Marley, uncle of Duke Graham
- Countess Sudrey Furstán-Kheldour: widow of Earl Hrorik II of Eastmarch

== Release details ==
- 1994, USA, Del Rey Books ISBN 0-345-33262-8, Pub date 10 May 1994, Hardcover (first edition)
- 1995, USA, Del Rey Books ISBN 0-345-39177-2, Pub date 27 June 1995, Paperback
