= High Deryni =

1973 novel by Katherine Kurtz

- Cover illustration by Alan Mardon for the first edition of High Deryni
- Author: Katherine Kurtz
- Cover artist: Alan Mardon
- Language: English
- Series: The Chronicles of the Deryni
- Genre: Fantasy
- Publisher: Ballantine Books
- Publication date: 12 August 1973
- Publication place: United States
- Media type: Print (Paperback & Hardcover)
- Pages: xiv, 339
- ISBN: 0-345-23485-5
- Preceded by: Deryni Checkmate
- Followed by: Camber of Culdi (next published), The Bishop's Heir (literary chronology)

High Deryni is a historical fantasy novel by American-born author Katherine Kurtz. It was first published by Ballantine Books as the sixty-first volume of the celebrated Ballantine Adult Fantasy series in September 1973 and has been reprinted a number of times since. A revised and updated edition of the novel was released in 2007 by Ace Books. High Deryni was the third of Kurtz' Deryni novels to be published, and the final book in the Chronicles of the Deryni Trilogy. The next Deryni book to be published was Camber of Culdi, which details events that occur two centuries before High Deryni. However, the internal literary chronology of events in the Deryni series is continued in The Bishop's Heir.

== Plot introduction ==
The novel is set in the land of Gwynedd, one of the fictional Eleven Kingdoms. Gwynedd itself is a medieval kingdom similar to the British Isles of the 12th century, with a powerful Holy Church (based on the Roman Catholic Church), and a feudal government ruled by a hereditary monarchy. The population of Gwynedd includes both humans and Deryni, a race of people with inherent physic and magical abilities who have been shunned and persecuted for centuries. The novel begins three months after the events of Deryni Checkmate, as young King Kelson Haldane struggles to resolve an internal ecclesiastical schism on the eve of an invasion by a powerful Deryni sorcerer.

== Plot summary ==
The novel takes place in June and July 1121, less than a year after the coronation of fourteen-year-old King Kelson Haldane. At the beginning of the book, Kelson is leading an army into the Duchy of Corwyn to put down the rebellion of an anti-Deryni zealot named Warin de Grey. Warin is allied with Archbishop Edmund Loris, the leader of the Holy Church. Together, they have taken the ducal capital of Coroth and are openly revolting against the Crown due to Kelson's support of his Deryni advisors, Duke Alaric Morgan and Monsignor Duncan McLain. Morgan and Duncan decide to go to Dhassa and seek to reconcile with the six bishops who have refused to follow Loris' anti-Deryni crusade. Meanwhile, in the border city of Cardosa, King Wencit Furstán, the powerful Deryni ruler of the neighboring kingdom of Torenth, seeks to convince Earl Bran Coris of Marley to betray Kelson and assist in an invasion of Gwynedd.

Morgan and Duncan arrive at Dhassa and surrender to the bishops, who are led by Thomas Cardiel and Denis Arilan. After hearing their explanations for their previous actions, the two bishops agree to forgive them. On the border, Earl Sean Lord Derry, Morgan's aide, is captured by Bran Coris. Coris has decided to betray Kelson and immediately turns Derry over to Wencit, who begins to torture Derry both physically and mentally. Morgan senses Derry's pain when he attempts to contact him, but his use of his powers is detected by Bishop Arilan, who reveals that he is also Deryni.

Kelson's army then marches to Coroth, where the young king confronts the rebellious archbishop. Unwilling to assault Coroth directly, Morgan sneaks into the castle with Kelson, Duncan, and Bishop Cardiel. Once inside, they confront Warin and force him to re-evaluate his beliefs by comparing his mysterious healing ability to Morgan's. Having acquired Warin's aid, Kelson confronts Loris the following morning and takes the archbishop into custody.

Cover of a later paperback edition of High Deryni

With the internal ecclesiastical schism now resolved, Kelson's army prepares to face the invading Torenthi army. Kelson learns of Bran Coris' treason, but is nonetheless determined to win the war. The Gwyneddan army arrives at the border shortly thereafter and is greeted by grisly evidence of Bran Coris' betrayal. During a parley session with the Torenthi invaders, Morgan manages to rescue Derry, but the army is unable to prevent the murder of fifty Gwyneddan soldiers, including Duncan's father. Wencit challenges Kelson to a Duel Arcane, a form of ritualized magical combat in which each king will be accompanied by three companions. Before Kelson can agree, Arilan suddenly requests a brief period to consider the challenge.

A short time later, Arilan reveals that he is not only Deryni, but also a member of the Camberian Council, a secretive group of highly trained Deryni who oversee and regulate such duels. In issuing his challenge, Wencit claims that he has secured the cooperation of the Council, but Arilan has heard nothing of such a request. He establishes a Transfer Portal in Kelson's tent and travels to the Council's chambers, demanding an explanation from his comrades. They soon realize that Wencit has attempted to trick Kelson by bringing four imposters to the duel. Though initially reluctant to arbitrate the duel, the Council finally agrees after Arilan brings Kelson, Morgan, and Duncan to confront them.

The following morning, Kelson rides out to face Wencit, accompanied by Morgan, Duncan, and Arilan. Although furious when the real Council arrives, Wencit eventually concedes to their presence. The Duel Arcane begins, but it is suddenly interrupted before the first spell can be summoned. One of Wencit's allies reveals himself to be another member of the Camberian Council, one who has been working to bring down Wencit for years for his own personal reasons. He provided poisoned wine for Wencit and his other allies, and all four are soon dying from its effects. Unwilling to let his enemies suffer needlessly, Kelson uses his powers to kill each of them. With Wencit's death, the Duel Arcane is ended and Kelson emerges victorious.

== Characters ==
- King Kelson Haldane: King of Gwynedd
- Duke Alaric Morgan: Duke of Corwyn, Lord General of the Royal Armies, King's Champion, cousin of Duncan McLain
- Monsignor Duncan McLain: Priest of the Holy Church of Gwynedd, cousin of Alaric Morgan
- Archbishop Edmund Loris: Archbishop of Valoret and Primate of All Gwynedd
- Warin de Grey: anti-Deryni fanatic in the Duchy of Corwyn
- Earl Sean "Derry" O'Flynn: Earl of Derry and aide to Duke Alaric Morgan
- Bishop Thomas Cardiel: Bishop of Dhassa
- Bishop Denis Arilan: Auxiliary Bishop of Rhemuth
- King Wencit Furstán: King of Torenth and the Festillic Pretender
- Earl Bran Coris: Earl of Marley

== Reception ==
Lester del Rey found the novel disappointing, saying that "the menaces have all turned into paper dragons" because the author has arbitrarily resolved the story's conflicts rather than working them out. He concluded that "In one novel the author has ruined everything [she] built up in the previous two."

== Awards and nominations ==
High Deryni was a finalist for the 1974 Mythopoeic Fantasy Award for outstanding work in the field of fantasy literature. The other finalists were Susan Cooper's The Dark Is Rising, Poul Anderson's Hrolf Kraki's Saga, and Sanders Anne Laubenthal's Excalibur. The winner of the award was The Hollow Hills by Mary Stewart, the sequel to The Crystal Cave, which won the same award in 1971 over Kurtz' first novel, Deryni Rising. Kurtz and Anderson had also been finalists the previous year, but Anderson would eventually win the award in 1975 for A Midsummer Tempest.

== Release details ==
- 1973, USA, Ballantine Books ISBN 0-345-23485-5, Pub date 12 August 1973, Paperback
- 1975, USA, Ballantine Books ISBN 0-345-24497-4, Pub date 12 January 1975, Paperback
- 1976, USA, Ballantine Books ISBN 0-345-25626-3, Pub date 12 August 1976, Paperback
- 1977, USA, Del Rey Books ISBN 0-345-27113-0, Pub date 12 June 1977, Paperback
- 1980, USA, Del Rey Books ISBN 0-345-28614-6, Pub date 12 January 1980, Paperback
- 1981, USA, Del Rey Books ISBN 0-345-30278-8, Pub date 12 August 1981, Paperback
- 1982, USA, Del Rey Books ISBN 0-345-30745-3, Pub date 12 April 1982, Paperback
- 1985, UK, Century Publishing ISBN 0-7126-0740-4, Paperback
- 1985, USA, Del Rey Books ISBN 0-345-33140-0, Pub date 12 October 1985, Paperback
- 1986, USA, Arrow Books ISBN 0-7126-9499-4, Pub date 12 June 1986, Hardcover
- 1990, UK, Legend Books ISBN 0-09-961930-X, Paperback
