= King Javan's Year =

1992 novel by Katherine Kurtz

- Hardcover edition
- Author: Katherine Kurtz
- Cover artist: Michael Herring
- Language: English
- Series: The Heirs of Saint Camber
- Genre: Fantasy
- Publisher: Del Rey Books
- Publication date: 1992
- Publication place: United States
- Media type: Print (Paperback & Hardcover)
- Pages: 490 (first edition, hardcover)
- ISBN: 0-345-33260-1 (first edition, hardcover)
- OCLC: 25915305
- Dewey Decimal: 813/.54 20
- LC Class: PS3561.U69 K48 1992
- Preceded by: The Harrowing of Gwynedd
- Followed by: The Bastard Prince

King Javan's Year is a historical fantasy novel by American-born author Katherine Kurtz. It was first published by Del Rey Books in 1992. It was the eleventh of Kurtz' Deryni novels to be published, and the second book in her fourth Deryni trilogy, The Heirs of Saint Camber. Although the Heirs trilogy was the fourth Deryni series to be published, it is a direct sequel to the second trilogy, The Legends of Camber of Culdi.

== Plot introduction ==
The novel is set in the land of Gwynedd, one of the fictional Eleven Kingdoms. Gwynedd itself is a medieval kingdom similar to the British Isles of the 10th century, with a powerful Holy Church (based on the Roman Catholic Church), and a feudal government ruled by a hereditary monarchy. The population of Gwynedd includes both humans and Deryni, a race of people with inherent psychic and magical abilities who are being systematically persecuted by both the Crown and the Church. The novel begins almost three years after the conclusion of The Harrowing of Gwynedd, as the continuously poor health of young King Alroy Haldane has brought him to his deathbed. To claim his rightful place as the next King of Gwynedd, Alroy's twin brother and heir, Prince Javan Haldane, must find a way to survive the political and religious machinations of Alroy's former Regents.

== Plot summary ==
The events of King Javan's Year span a period of approximately sixteen months, from June 921 to October 922. As the novel begins, the dying King Alroy Haldane commands that his twin brother, Prince Javan Haldane, be summoned to Rhemuth immediately. Although Alroy's former Regents seek to prevent the king from talking with his heir before his death, Alroy's youngest brother, Prince Rhys Michael Haldane, risks their wrath by sending a small party of knights to retrieve Javan from the abbey where he has spent the past three years. The Healer Oriel manages to keep Alroy alive until Javan's arrival, and the two brothers share a final conversation before the young king finally dies.

The lords of state immediately attempt to pass over Javan in favor of Rhys Michael, believing the younger brother will be a more biddable king. However, Javan succeeds in disproving their claim that he took permanent religious vows, and he is proclaimed the legal heir during an Accession Council that afternoon. Javan is surprised to discover that several young knights and nobles at Court have already allied themselves with him, including his former squire, Sir Charlan Morgan, and two secret Deryni, Etienne de Courcy and his son Guiscard. The following night, Guiscard sneaks Javan out of Rhemuth to meet with Father Joram MacRorie and several other Deryni allies. Shortly thereafter, Javan's Haldane potential is fully activated by Joram, Dom Queron Kinevan, and Javan's old friend, Tavis O'Neill.

Over the next month, Javan attempts to secure his position and establish his strength without revealing his magical abilities or overtly provoking the lords of state. By the end of June, Javan and Joram succeed in creating a new Transfer Portal in the castle. Javan's official coronation occurs on July 31, but the ensuing celebration is marred by an old rivalry between two powerful lords. Earl Hrorik II of Eastmarch accuses Earl Murdoch of Carthane of murdering his brother, an event that occurred three years earlier at Alroy's and Javan's thirteenth birthday. The two nobles engage in a duel to the death the following day, and Hrorik mortally wounds Murdoch. Before his death, Murdoch urges his allies to move against Javan, believing the king is becoming too powerful to control.

Several weeks later, Javan discovers his brother dallying with Lady Michaela Drummond in the castle garden. Javan orders Rhys Michael to stay away from Michaela, fearing that any child of Rhys Michael's will only weaken his own position on the throne since the lords of state will be more willing to attack him if the royal line is secured for another generation. Although Rhys Michael dislikes the great lords, he refuses to believe they present as great a threat as Javan believes. Nonetheless, he agrees to stay away from Michaela.

At the end of October, while traveling as a deputy with one of Javan's legal commissions, Rhys Michael is attacked and abducted. Although the culprits are publicly identified as Ansel MacRorie and other Deryni bandits, the prince has actually been kidnapped by knights under the command of the great lords. After being "rescued" several days later, Rhys Michael is taken to Culdi to recover from his wounds. As planned by the great lords, the prince is reunited with Michaela, and the two are soon married by the end of November. By the time Javan discovers the plan by reading Archbishop Hubert's mind, he is far too late to prevent the marriage. When Rhys Michael and his new wife return to Rhemuth in early December, Javan can do nothing but acknowledge his new sister-in-law and welcome her to the family.

Over the following months, Javan continues his potentially lethal dance of power with the great lords. In March, the former Regents command one of their Deryni collaborators to murder Oriel. Oriel survives the attack, but both Javan and Guiscard are forced to employ their arcane powers to defend the Healer. As the incident is investigated further, the great lords become increasingly suspicious of the king. Although he repeatedly attempts to free former Deryni Ursin O'Carroll, Ursin is murdered before Javan can succeed. The king decides to take the families of the deceased Deryni collaborators to Master Revan, hoping that the secret Deryni working with Revan will block the families' Deryni powers and they will be allowed to go free.

Javan departs Rhemuth in early May, leaving his brother in command of the royal castle. The king's party arrives at the river several days later, but tragedy quickly erupts as the great lords make their final move against Javan. Episcopal soldiers disguised as renegade Michaelines attack both the cult and the king's party. When Tavis uses his powers to protect a young girl, the surviving Willimites realize that Revan's baptismal ceremony has been a fraud, and they quickly turn on their former leader. Revan and Tavis are slain almost immediately, but the Willimites themselves are struck down by the false Michaelines. Javan and his party fight bravely, but they are soon outnumbered by both the false Michaelines and the great lords who have betrayed the king. Guiscard falls first in the battle, but both Javan and Charlan are eventually killed.

At the same time in Rhemuth, the remaining great lords launch a coup against Rhys Michael. Several lords and knights are quickly slain as Rhys Michael is captured, and special care is taken to ensure Oriel's death. The prince is informed that he will do as he is told and follow orders or he and his wife will be killed. The shock of the coup causes Michaela to go into premature labor, but their first son is stillborn. Over the next several months, Rhys Michael is constantly drugged to ensure his compliance with the wishes of the great lords. Javan's body is returned to Rhemuth, and Rhys Michael is formally crowned as King of Gwynedd. Eventually, the new king is reunited with his wife and informed that he must soon provide a royal heir or someone else will perform the action for him. Resigned to their fate, Rhys Michael and Michaela agree to start having children, but they secretly maintain the desperate hope of one day being free of the great lords.

== Characters ==
- King Javan Haldane: King of Gwynedd, twin brother and heir of King Alroy, elder brother of Prince Rhys Michael
- Prince Rhys Michael Haldane: Prince of Gwynedd, Duke of Carthmoor, younger brother and heir of King Javan
- King Alroy Haldane: King of Gwynedd, twin brother of King Javan, eldest brother of Prince Rhys Michael
- Father Joram MacRorie: former Michaeline priest and knight, son of Saint Camber, member of the Camberian Council
- Dom Queron Kinevan: former Gabrilite priest and Healer, founder of the Servants of Saint Camber, member of the Camberian Council
- Lord Tavis O'Neill: former personal Healer to King Javan, member of the Camberian Council
- Lord Ansel MacRorie: grandson of Saint Camber, nephew of Joram MacRorie, member of the Camberian Council
- Lord Jesse MacGregor: eldest son and heir of Earl Gregory, member of the Camberian Council
- Lord Oriel de Bourg: Healer in the forced service of Archbishop Hubert
- Baron Etienne de Courcy: Confidential Secretary of King Javan, father of Sir Guiscard
- Sir Guiscard de Courcy: aide to King Javan, son of Baron Etienne de Courcy
- Sir Charlan Morgan: aide to King Javan
- Father Faelan: Confessor to King Javan
- Lady Michaela Drummond: ward of Earl Manfred, half-sister of Ansel MacRorie
- Archbishop Hubert MacInnis: Archbishop of Valoret and Primate of All Gwynedd
- Earl Manfred MacInnis: Earl of Culdi
- Earl Rhun von Horthy: Earl of Sheele
- Earl Murdoch: Earl of Carthane
- Earl Tammaron Fitz-Arthur: Lord Chancellor of Gwynedd
- Father Paulin Sinclair: Vicar General of the Custodes Fidei, brother of Albertus
- Lord Albertus: Grand Master of the Equites Custodum Fidei, Earl Marshal of Gwynedd
- Master Dimitri: Deryni collaborator working for Father Paulin
- Master Revan: leader of a pseudo-religious baptizer cult created by the Camberian Council

== Release details ==
- 1992, USA, Del Rey Books ISBN 0-345-33260-1, Pub date 10 November 1992, Hardcover (first edition)
- 1993, USA, Del Rey Books ISBN 0-345-38478-4, Paperback
