= Camber of Culdi =

1976 novel by Katherine Kurtz

- Cover illustration by Ted Coconia for the first edition of Camber of Culdi
- Author: Katherine Kurtz
- Cover artist: Ted Coconia
- Language: English
- Series: The Legends of Camber of Culdi
- Genre: Fantasy
- Publisher: Ballantine Books
- Publication date: 12 June 1976
- Publication place: United States
- Media type: Print (hardback & paperback)
- Pages: xx, 314 (first edition, paperback)
- ISBN: 0-345-24590-3 (first edition, paperback)
- OCLC: 2091486
- Dewey Decimal: 813/.5/4
- LC Class: PS3561.U69 C36 1979
- Preceded by: High Deryni (by publication date)
- Followed by: Saint Camber

Camber of Culdi is fantasy novel by American-born author Katherine Kurtz. It was first published by Ballantine Books on June 12, 1976. It was the fourth novel in Kurtz' Deryni novels to be published, and the first book in her second Deryni trilogy, The Legends of Camber of Culdi. The Legends trilogy serves as prequels to The Chronicles of the Deryni series that Kurtz wrote from 1970 to 1973, and it details the events that occurred two centuries before the Chronicles trilogy. Therefore, although it was the fourth Deryni novel to be published, Camber of Culdi is the earliest novel to occur within the series' internal literary chronology.

== Plot introduction ==
The novel is set in the land of Gwynedd, one of the fictional Eleven Kingdoms. Gwynedd itself is a medieval kingdom similar to the British Isles of the 10th century, with a powerful Holy Church (based on the Roman Catholic Church), and a feudal government ruled by a hereditary monarchy. The population of Gwynedd includes both humans and Deryni, a race of people with inherent psychic and magical abilities. The novel takes place eight decades after a foreign Deryni prince invaded Gwynedd and overthrew the human king. Though still a minority of the population, Deryni control the throne, the Church, and almost all positions of power throughout the realm, and many lead privileged lives at the expense of the human majority. However, a wave of human resentment in starting to surge throughout the kingdom, and a powerful Deryni lord embarks on a quest to restore the ancient line of Haldane kings.

== Plot summary ==
The novel spans the time period between September 903 and December 904, beginning shortly after the murder of a Deryni lord named Rannulf. Unable to locate Rannulf's murderer, King Imre Furstán-Festil issues a decree ordering the deaths of fifty human peasants unless the murderer is identified. The peasants are tenants of Earl Camber MacRorie of Culdi, a respected Deryni master who formerly served Imre's father.

Meanwhile, the Healer Rhys Thuryn attends the final hours of an elderly patient. Before his death, the patient confides that he is really Prince Aidan Haldane, the sole survivor of the Deryni coup that overthrew the Haldane kings eight decades earlier. He begs Rhys to seek out his grandson, Prince Cinhil Haldane, who is the last remaining member of the former royal bloodline. Rhys recruits the assistance of Father Joram MacRorie, and the two of them determine that Cinhil is one of five monks living in seclusion in various religious houses throughout the realm. Before continuing their search, they seek the counsel of Joram's father, Earl Camber.

In the capital city of Valoret, Lord Cathan MacRorie, Camber's eldest son and heir, continues to request mercy for the imprisoned peasants. Although a close friend of the king, Cathan is unable to persuade Imre to revoke his decree. However, Imre permits Cathan to save just one of the peasants, forcing him to personally choose from among the doomed commoners. Unable to prevent the executions, Cathan nearly goes mad with grief.

Rhys and Joram continue their search for the Haldane prince, but it is Camber and Rhys who eventually discover Cinhil, who is living the peaceful religious life of a monk in a secluded abbey. Unwilling to compromise Cathan's position at court, they do not tell Cathan of their discovery, but Cathan's position is already being undermined by his ambitious brother-in-law, Lord Coel Howell. Coel continually sows mistrust between Imre and Cathan, and eventually succeeds in framing Cathan for the murder of another Deryni lord. Convinced that Cathan has betrayed him, Imre murders his friend. Racked with grief and self-loathing, Imre seeks comfort in the arms of his sister, Princess Ariella, and soon begins an incestuous relationship with her.

Cathan's body is returned to his father, who decides to immediately move forward with his plans to overthrow Imre. After dispatching Joram and Rhys to retrieve Cinhil, Camber and his daughter, Evaine, meet with the Michaelines, a militant religious order that has agreed to provide military support for the upcoming coup attempt. Soon thereafter, Imre's suspicions grow to include the entire MacRorie family, and he soon orders their arrest. However, the MacRories manage to escape capture, and the entire Michaeline order goes into hiding to elude Imre's wrath.

Rhys and Joram manage to abduct Cinhil, but the prince is unwilling to abandon his religious life. Although Camber and his allies attempt to convince Cinhil that he must become king for the greater good of the realm, the anguished prince is haunted by his conscience and his heart-felt vocation as a priest. Nonetheless, Camber continues to prepare Cinhil for the throne, attempting to teach him about the secular world that he abandoned. Camber eventually convinces Archbishop Anscom, the Archbishop of Valoret and one of Camber's oldest friends, to support their cause. Anscom absolves Cinhil's religious vows, acknowledges him as the legitimate heir to the throne, and presides over his marriage to Camber's ward.

After several months of working with Cinhil, Camber becomes convinced that Cinhil has the unique ability to acquire Deryni-like powers. Assisted by several members of his family, Camber performs a ritual designed to bestow Deryni powers on the prince. Although they believe the ritual to be successful, Cinhil refuses to display any indication of his new abilities for several months. However, at the baptism of his son several months later, Cinhil's powers become clearly evident. When his son is poisoned by an unwitting assassin, the furious prince uses his powers to locate and kill the murderer. From that point on, Cinhil becomes dedicated to avenging his slain son, vowing to overthrow and kill Imre.

In December, the coup is finally launched. Using several Transfer Portals, Camber, Cinhil, and their Michaeline allies infiltrate the royal palace in Valoret in the middle of the night. Their forces quickly overcome the guards, and soon burst into the royal bedchamber. While Imre is captured, his sister escapes through a secret passage, bearing her brother's child in her womb. Imre lashes out with his powers at Cinhil, but the Haldane prince uses his own powers to withstand the attack. Realizing he cannot win, Imre commits suicide rather than submit to imprisonment. As the fighting comes to an end, Camber crowns Cinhil as King of Gwynedd.

== Characters ==
Cover of a later paperback edition.

- Earl Camber MacRorie: Earl of Culdi
- Prince Cinhil Haldane: last scion of the House of Haldane
- King Imre Furstán-Festil: King of Gwynedd
- Princess Ariella Furstána-Festila: Princess of Gwynedd and sister of King Imre
- Lord Cathan MacRorie: eldest son and heir of Earl Camber MacRorie
- Father Joram MacRorie: Michaeline knight and priest, younger son of Earl Camber MacRorie
- Lady Evaine MacRorie: daughter of Earl Camber MacRorie
- Lord Rhys Thuryn: Healer, friend of the MacRorie family
- Lord Coel Howell: brother-in-law of Cathan MacRorie
- Father Alister Cullen: Vicar-General of the Michaelines

== Awards and nominations ==
Camber of Culdi was nominated for the 1977 August Derleth Award by the British Fantasy Society. Kurtz was nominated alongside fellow American-born author Anne Rice, who was selected for her first novel, Interview with the Vampire. However, the award was won by Canadian author Gordon R. Dickson for his novel, The Dragon and the George.
