= The Quest for Saint Camber =

1986 historical fantasy novel by Katherine Kurtz

- Paperback Edition
- Author: Katherine Kurtz
- Cover artist: Darrell K. Sweet
- Language: English
- Series: The Histories of King Kelson
- Genre: Fantasy
- Publisher: Del Rey Books
- Publication date: 1986
- Publication place: United States
- Media type: Print (Paperback & Hardcover)
- Pages: 435 (first edition, hardcover)
- ISBN: 0-345-31826-9 (first edition, hardcover)
- OCLC: 13395557
- Dewey Decimal: 813/.54 19
- LC Class: PS3561.U69 Q47 1986
- Preceded by: The King's Justice
- Followed by: The Harrowing of Gwynedd (next published), King Kelson's Bride (literary chronology)

The Quest for Saint Camber is a historical fantasy novel by American-born author Katherine Kurtz. It was first published by Del Rey Books in 1986. It was the ninth of Kurtz' Deryni novels to be published, and the third book in her third Deryni trilogy, The Histories of King Kelson. Just as the Histories trilogy is a direct sequel to the first Deryni trilogy, The Chronicles of the Deryni, the next Deryni trilogy to be published, The Heirs of Saint Camber, is a direct sequel to Kurtz' second Deryni trilogy, The Legends of Saint Camber. In 2000, Kurtz published her thirteenth Deryni novel, King Kelson's Bride, which is a direct sequel to the events of The Quest for Saint Camber.

== Plot introduction ==
The novel is set in the land of Gwynedd, one of the fictional Eleven Kingdoms. Gwynedd itself is a medieval kingdom similar to the British Isles of the 12th century, with a powerful Holy Church (based on the Roman Catholic Church), and a feudal government ruled by a hereditary monarchy. The population of Gwynedd includes both humans and Deryni, a race of people with inherent physic and magical abilities who have been brutally persecuted and suppressed for over two centuries. The novel begins approximately eight months after the conclusion of The King's Justice, as King Kelson Haldane embarks on a religious quest to celebrate his knighting. When a deadly accident befalls Kelson's party, a close member of the king's family uses illicit arcane power to seize the throne of Gwynedd.

== Plot summary ==
The plot of The Quest for Saint Camber covers a period of approximately three months, from early March to mid-June 1125. The novel begins as Prince Conall Haldane, cousin of King Kelson Haldane, meets with the Deryni adept Tiercel de Claron, a member of the Camberian Council who has been secretly working with Conall to develop the prince's Haldane potential. Meanwhile, Bishop Duncan McLain faces an ecclesiastical tribunal to confirm the legitimacy of the marriage vows he took years before becoming a priest. With the assistance of both Kelson and Duke Alaric Morgan, Duncan convinces Archbishop Thomas Cardiel that his brief marriage was legal, thus confirming the trueborn status of his son, Earl Dhugal MacArdry.

A few days later, Kelson, Conall, and Dhugal are all knighted. During the ceremony, Duncan publicly reveals that he is Deryni, an act which causes a great deal of consternation among his fellow bishops. Afterwards, Kelson confesses his growing affection for Princess Rothana of Nur Hallaj, a Deryni religious novice who admits that her love for the king is causing her to doubt her vocation. Although the two make no binding promises, they agree to pursue a deeper commitment when Kelson returns from his summer quest. Their conversation is observed by Conall, whose own attraction for Rothana further fuels his jealousy toward his royal cousin. Conall meets with Tiercel again, but an argument between teacher and pupil results in tragedy when an angry Conall shoves Tiercel down a flight of stairs, breaking his neck and killing him instantly. Conall pilfers a satchel of drugs from Tiercel's corpse, probes the dead man's mind for additional arcane knowledge, then leaves the body hidden deep within the walls of Rhemuth castle.

Shortly thereafter, Kelson embarks on a quest to discover lost relics of Saint Camber, accompanied by Dhugal, Conall, and a small party of companions. After their departure from Rhemuth, Duncan discovers Tiercel's body. After informing Prince Regent Nigel Haldane, Kelson's uncle and Conall's father, Duncan travels to Valoret, where he informs Bishop Denis Arilan, another member of the Camberian Council, of Tiercel's mysterious death. Meanwhile, Kelson and his party are exploring the ruins of the MacRorie family lands near Culdi. While traveling through the steep hills, a deadly accident occurs when a rain-soaked trail collapses and several members of the group fall into the river below. Kelson and Dhugal disappear into the river and are quickly swept underground by the current. Although the surviving members of the group search desperately for the pair, they eventually conclude that Kelson and Dhugal are dead.

The survivors of the king's party return to Rhemuth, where they inform Nigel of his nephew's death. Stricken with grief, the new king refuses to be crowned until Kelson's body is found or a year and a day pass. While the court attempts to proceed in the wake of Kelson's death, Duncan travels to Corwyn to inform Morgan of the accident. However, Kelson and Dhugal have both survived the incident, and have been swept underground by the river's current. Although desperate to find a way out of the cavern, Dhugal must first struggle to keep Kelson alive while attempting to treat the king's injuries.

In Rhemuth, Conall begins adjusting to his new role as heir to the throne. He pressures Rothana to marry him, playing on her grief for Kelson to convince her that he will need a Deryni queen as much as Kelson did. At Arilan's urging, Conall then tries to convince his father to accept his responsibilities as the next king. However, during the conversation, Conall accidentally reveals his own knowledge of Tiercel de Claron. Desperate to keep his part in Tiercel's death a secret, Conall lashes out with his magical powers, but he is unable to completely control the energy he unleashes. Although Nigel survives the attack, he is left in a comatose state from which he cannot awaken. With Kelson presumed dead and Nigel incapacitated, Conall is acknowledged as Prince Regent.

While Kelson and Dhugal continue to struggle for survival, Conall moves to secure his new position of authority. He finally convinces Rothana to marry him, then allows Morgan, Duncan, and Arilan to perform a ritual designed to activate his Haldane potential. After the ritual, Morgan and Duncan depart Rhemuth, determined to find the bodies of Kelson and Dhugal. The missing king and earl eventually reach a series of underground tombs and slowly work their way through each one. When they finally escape the tombs, they are immediately captured and imprisoned. Dhugal discovers that he has inherited his father's Healing talent and quickly heals both himself and the king. Their captors identify themselves as the Servants of Saint Camber, a semi-religious group who have remained hidden for two centuries. To earn their freedom, Kelson agrees to undergo a ritual trial to prove their worthiness. On the same night that Conall and Rothana are married, Kelson submits to the trial and receives a vision of Saint Camber. Meanwhile, Morgan and Duncan succeed in contacting Dhugal, who waits anxiously for the king's return.

The following morning, Kelson emerges from the trial and tells the Servants of his vision, promising to restore Saint Camber to a place of honor in Gwynedd. He and Dhugal are released, and the two later rendezvous with Morgan and Duncan. As all four discuss the recent events, they begin to suspect Conall's treachery. Kelson returns briefly to Valoret, where the Curia of Bishops restores Duncan's priestly status despite his Deryni heritage. Several days later, the royal party uses a Transfer Portal to return to Rhemuth, where Morgan, Duncan, and Dhugal use their combined powers to heal Nigel. Nigel confirms Conall's treason, and the prince is immediately taken prisoner. Before Conall's trial, Rothana informs Kelson that she is carrying Conall's child. Although Kelson still declares his love for her, Rothana refuses to consider marrying Kelson, believing that she is no longer a worthy bride for the King of Gwynedd. During the trial, Conall defiantly admits to all of his crimes, including Tiercel's death and the attack on Nigel. He challenges Kelson to a Duel Arcane, but the king defeats Conall by conjuring a surprisingly powerful image of Saint Camber.

Almost two months later, Kelson and Dhugal travel to Corwyn after the birth of Morgan's son and heir. They discuss Conall's execution and Rothana's continuing refusal to marry Kelson, despite their love for each other. While riding along the beach, they encounter a mysterious man who provides them with both a vision of Saint Camber's tomb and an additional clue to aid their ongoing quest.

== Characters ==
- King Kelson Haldane: King of Gwynedd
- Duke Alaric Morgan: Duke of Corwyn, King's Champion, Lord General of the Royal Armies, cousin of Duncan McLain
- Bishop Duncan McLain: Auxiliary Bishop of Rhemuth, Duke of Cassan, Earl of Kierney, father of Dhugal MacArdry, cousin of Alaric Morgan
- Earl Dhugal MacArdry: Earl of Transha, son of Duncan McLain
- Prince Nigel Haldane: Prince of Gwynedd, Duke of Carthmoor, uncle of King Kelson
- Prince Conall Haldane: Prince of Gwynedd, eldest son and heir of Nigel Haldane, cousin of King Kelson
- Bishop Denis Arilan: Bishop of Dhassa, member of the Camberian Council
- Princess Rothana of Nur Hallaj: novice at Saint Brigid's Abbey
- Duchess Meraude de Traherne: Duchess of Carthmoor, wife of Nigel Haldane, mother of Conall Haldane, aunt of King Kelson
- Earl Saer de Traherne: Earl of Rhendall, brother of Duchess Meraude
- Tiercel de Claron: member of the Camberian Council

== Reception ==
A review from The Christian Science Monitor called it "a detail-ridden pageant of pseudo-history and myth, rich in political and religious implication". According to a Library Journal book review, it "skillfully combines magic with the medieval". According to a review in Lan's Lantern, the book raised enough questions to "form the basis of the next several books", and that each book in the series, including The Quest for Saint Camber, is enjoyable without requiring knowledge of the previous books.

Kirkus Reviews described it as "Formulaic, self-referential, and a trifle cumbersome", but still enjoyable for fans of the series.

A review in School Library Journal observed the series popularity among young adults.

== Awards and nominations ==
In 1987, The Quest for Saint Camber was ranked 9th in an annual poll of fantasy novels by Locus magazine readers, placing it between Megan Lindholm's Wizard of the Pigeons and Raymond E. Feist's A Darkness at Sethanon. The poll was won by Gene Wolfe for his novel, Soldier of the Mist.

== Release details ==
- 1986, USA, Ballantine Books ISBN 0-345-31826-9, Hardcover (first edition)
- 1986, USA, Del Rey Books ISBN 5-551-64736-6, Pub date September 1986, Hardcover
- 1987, UK, Arrow Books ISBN 0-09-950360-3, Pub date 21 May 1987, Paperback
- 1987, USA, Del Rey Books ISBN 0-345-30099-8, Pub date 12 August 1987, Paperback
