= Deryni novels =

Series of historical fantasy novels by Katherine Kurtz

The Deryni novels are a series of historical fantasy novels by the American author Katherine Kurtz.

The first novel in the series to be published was Deryni Rising in 1970, and the most recent, The King's Deryni, was published in 2014. As of 2016, the series consists of five trilogies, one stand-alone novel, various short stories, and two reference books.

Most of the series is set in the land of Gwynedd, one of the fictional Eleven Kingdoms (portions of King Kelson's Bride take place in the rival kingdom of Torenth). Gwynedd itself is a medieval kingdom that roughly parallels 10th, 11th, or 12th-century England, Scotland, and Wales with a powerful Holy Church (based on the Roman Catholic Church), and a feudal government ruled by a hereditary monarchy. The population of the Eleven Kingdoms includes both humans and Deryni, a race of people with inherent psychic or magical abilities. Throughout the course of the series, relations between humans and Deryni result in ongoing political and religious strife that is often interconnected with the individual lives of the main characters.

While the plots of the novels often involve political, ecclesiastical, and military conflicts on a grand scale, they are counterbalanced by details of the characters' personal lives. Neither race is depicted as inherently "good" nor "evil", as both humans and Deryni are depicted as protagonists and antagonists at various points of the series. Additionally, the novels often depict the characters engaging in various forms of magic, and such scenes vary in importance from minor events to significant plot points.

== Novels ==
The five Deryni trilogies were published in an order which does not match the internal literary chronology of the series. The first four trilogies alternated between the 12th and 10th centuries, while the fifth trilogy is set immediately prior to the events of the first trilogy. The stand-alone novel, King Kelson's Bride, takes place after the third trilogy. The trilogies are briefly listed by publication date and historical order below, with a more detailed listing after.

- Publication order
  - The Chronicles of the Deryni
  - The Legends of Camber of Culdi
  - The Histories of King Kelson
  - The Heirs of Saint Camber
  - King Kelson's Bride
  - The Childe Morgan Trilogy
- Historical order:
  - The Legends of Camber of Culdi
  - The Heirs of Saint Camber
  - The Childe Morgan Trilogy
  - The Chronicles of the Deryni
  - The Histories of King Kelson
  - King Kelson's Bride

=== The Chronicles of the Deryni ===
- Deryni Rising (1970)
  - November 1120: Kelson Haldane must protect his crown from a Deryni usurper.
- Deryni Checkmate (1972)
  - March 1121: Alaric Morgan and Duncan McLain face the wrath of the Holy Church.
- High Deryni (1973)
  - June 1121 – July 1121: Kelson Haldane attempts to repair an ecclesiastical schism on the eve of a foreign invasion.

=== The Legends of Camber of Culdi ===
- Camber of Culdi (1976)
  - September 903 – December 904: The events that inspired Camber MacRorie to lead the Haldane Restoration.
- Saint Camber (1978)
  - June 905 – January 907: The struggles of Camber MacRorie to protect the throne of Cinhil Haldane.
- Camber the Heretic (1981)
  - January 917 – January 918: An anti-Deryni backlash sweeps through Gwynedd, threatening the lives of every Deryni in the kingdom.

=== The Histories of King Kelson ===
- The Bishop's Heir (1984)
  - November 1123 – January 1124: An old political conflict threatens to erupt once again.
- The King's Justice (1985)
  - May 1124 – July 1124: Kelson Haldane leads a military campaign to put down a rebellion
- The Quest for Saint Camber (1986)
  - March 1125 – June 1125: A tragic accident befalls Kelson Haldane during a religious quest.

=== The Heirs of Saint Camber ===
- The Harrowing of Gwynedd (1989)
  - January 918 – August 918: The Deryni desperately try to survive the persecutions.
- King Javan's Year (1992)
  - June 921 – October 922: Javan Haldane struggles to secure his throne.
- The Bastard Prince (1994)
  - May 928 – December 928: Rhys Michael Haldane must defend his crown from a foreign invader.

=== The Childe Morgan Trilogy ===
- In the King's Service (2003)
  - Summer 1082 – November 1091: Donal Blaine Haldane seeks a Deryni protector for his sons.
- Childe Morgan (2006)
  - December 1093 - March 1096: Kenneth and Alyce Morgan prepare their son Alaric for his future role.
- The King's Deryni (December 2, 2014)
  - January 1099 - November 1106: A young Alaric Morgan grows up at court under the protection and friendship of King Brion Haldane.

=== Other novels ===
- King Kelson's Bride (2000)
  - June 1128 – August 1128: Kelson Haldane faces the plots and intrigues of the Torenthi royal court.

== Short stories ==
- "Swords Against the Marluk" (1977)
  - Set in 1105, the story details the battle between Brion Haldane and Hogan Gwernach Furstán-Festil. Originally published in the fourth volume of Flashing Swords!, the events of this tale are expanded upon in the Childe Morgan Trilogy.
- The Deryni Archives (1986)
  - A collection of short stories that take place at different points throughout Gwyneddan history. All of the stories were written by Katherine Kurtz.
    - "Catalyst": In the fall of 888, a young Rhys Thuryn discovers his abilities as a Healer. This story was first published in Moonsinger's Friends in 1985.
    - "Healer's Song": In August of 914, Rhys Thuryn and his wife celebrate the birth of their new son. This story was first published in Fantasy Book in 1982.
    - "Vocation": In December 977, a reluctant noble feels the lure of a religious life. This story was first published in Nine Visions in 1983.
    - "Bethane": In the summer of 1100, a bitter old woman encounters a group of young Deryni nobles. This story was first published in Hecate's Cauldron in 1982.
    - "The Priesting of Arilan": From August 1104 to February 1105, Denis Arilan attempts to become the first Deryni priest in two centuries.
    - "Legacy": In June 1105, Charissa Furstána-Festila relates the tale of her father's battle with King Brion Haldane. This story was first published in Fantasy Book in 1983.
    - "The Knighting of Derry": In May 1115, Sean Lord Derry travels to the royal court and meets Duke Alaric Morgan.
    - "Trial": In the spring of 1118, Alaric Morgan observes the trial of an accused murderer.
- "Venture in Vain" (2001)
  - Set in the year 1089, only 300 copies of this rare, limited-edition short story were published.
- Deryni Tales (2002)
  - A collection of short stories written by fans of the Deryni series. Katherine Kurtz edited the collection and contributed an additional short story of her own. Kurtz' story, "The Green Tower", is set in 1052 and tells the tale of two young girls and the events surrounding a dangerous magical experiment.

== Reference books ==
- Deryni Magic (1990)
  - A companion book to the series that details the fictional style of magic used by the Deryni, including both natural psychic abilities and complex arcane rituals.
- Codex Derynianus (1998)
  - Written by Katherine Kurtz and Robert Reginald, this book is a comprehensive encyclopedia of the people and places in the Deryni series, including maps and genealogical charts. The first edition of the book was a limited-edition hardcover slipcase of which only 500 were printed. In 2005, a second edition of the book was published as a trade paperback, and it was updated to include information from King Kelson's Bride.

== Setting ==
Eleven Kingdoms
- Deryni novels location
- Map created by Grey Ghost Press for a role-playing game
- Created by: Katherine Kurtz
- Genre: Historical fantasy

In-universe information
- Type: Fantasy world
- Locations: Gwynedd, Torenth
- Characters: Kelson Haldane, Camber MacRorie

Most of the books are set in the fictional Kingdom of Gwynedd, one of the Eleven Kingdoms. The other kingdoms are Bremagne, The Connait, Howicce, Llannedd, Kheldour, Meara, Mooryn, Orsal, Tralia, and Torenth.

== Characters ==
=== 10th century ===
==== Alister Cullen ====
- Appearances: Camber of Culdi, Saint Camber

Alister Cullen is the Vicar General of the Order of Saint Michael. Born in 858, the young Deryni trains for the life of a religious knight from childhood, eventually being ordained a priest in 877 and joining the Michaelines in 879. He is elected Vicar General of the order in 901, and he still holds the position at the time of his first appearance in Camber of Culdi. Cullen enjoys a close friendship with Grand Master Jebediah d'Alcara, and he serves as a mentor to Father Joram MacRorie. An outspoken critic of King Imre Furstán-Festil, Cullen eventually agrees to support a coup against the king when he is approached by Joram and his father, Earl Camber MacRorie of Culdi, and the Michaelines provide essential military support for the Haldane Restoration. In 905, between the events of Camber of Culdi and Saint Camber, Cullen is elected Bishop of Grecotha, but he delays his formal consecration to deal with the impending invasion of Princess Ariella Furstána-Festila. Cullen commands the Michaeline forces during the Battle of Iomaire, but he is killed in personal combat by Ariella, although he uses the last of his strength to slay the princess. After the battle, Cullen's body is discovered by Joram and Camber, and Camber uses his arcane powers to assume Cullen's memories and appearance. For the next thirteen years, Camber lives a secret life as the slain Cullen, eventually rising to the positions of Chancellor of Gwynedd and Archbishop Primate of All Gwynedd. Cullen is 46 years old at the time of his death in 905, but most of the world believes that he dies at the age of 59 in 918.

==== Javan Haldane ====
Javan Jashan Urien Haldane is the fourteenth King of Gwynedd. He is the ninth member of the House of Haldane to serve as king, and the third consecutive Haldane king following the end of the Festillic Interregnum.

==== Rhys Michael Haldane ====
Rhys Michael Alister Haldane is the fifteenth King of Gwynedd. He is the tenth member of the House of Haldane to serve as king, and the fourth consecutive Haldane king following the end of the Festillic Interregnum.

==== Jebediah ====
- Appearances: Camber of Culdi, Saint Camber, Camber the Heretic, The Deryni Archives ("Healer's Song")

Jebediah d'Alcara is born in 861, and he joins the Order of Saint Michael as a lay knight at the age of 17. The Deryni knight is elected Grand Master of the order in 902, and he enjoys a close friendship with the Vicar General, Father Alister Cullen. He participates in the Haldane Restoration of 904, and later serves as one of the senior military commanders at the Battle of Iomaire the following year. Later that year, King Cinhil Haldane appoints him Earl Marshal of Gwynedd and Field Commander of the Royal Armies, as well giving Jebediah a place on the Royal Council. In 906, he discovers that Camber MacRorie has been impersonating Alister Cullen for over a year, since the death of the Vicar General at the Battle of Iomaire, and the discovery results in a closer relationship with Camber and his family. He is a founding member of the Camberian Council in 909, and he continues in his various military roles until the death of King Cinhil in 917. After Cinhil's death, Jebediah is dismissed from his royal appointments, and he spends much of his time organizing the covert movement of the Michaeline order out of Gwynedd. He dies at the age of 56 in 918, slain while defending Camber/Alister from the Regents' forces.

==== Queron Kinevan ====
- Appearances: Saint Camber, Camber the Heretic, The Harrowing of Gwynedd, King Javan's Year, The Bastard Prince

Queron Kinevan is a highly skilled Deryni Healer born in 872, and one of the primary protagonists of the Heirs of Saint Camber trilogy. He enters the Order of Saint Gabriel in 885 and is later ordained a priest in 892. In 906, he resigns from the Gabrilites and successfully campaigns to have Earl Camber MacRorie of Culdi canonized as a saint. Afterwards, he serves as Abbott of the Monastery at Dolban, the motherhouse of the newly founded Servants of Saint Camber. When Dolban is destroyed during the initial onslaught of anti-Deryni persecutions in late 917, Queron is forced into exile to escape the destruction. He is inducted into the Camberian Council in 918, and Camber's children later reveal the truth of their father's supposed death to Queron. The Healer assists Lady Evaine MacRorie Thuryn and Father Joram MacRorie in an arcane ritual to revive Camber, but Camber is not restored to life and Evaine dies during the ritual.

Queron spends much of the rest of his life in exile, secretly working with the rest of the Camberian Council to protect Deryni from the persecutions and protect the Haldane Kings of Gwynedd. In 921, he participates in the activation of King Javan Haldane's Haldane potential, performing the ritual with Joram and Tavis O'Neill. A year later, he is present when the lords of state murder Javan and destroy Revan's baptizer cult, but he once again manages to escape the violence. In 928, he secretly meets with King Rhys Michael Haldane in an attempt to heal the king's wound, but Queron is unable to save the life of the injured monarch. Several weeks later, Queron accompanies the new Regents when they confront and arrest the lords of state who killed both Javan and Rhys Michael. Queron's exact date of death is unknown, but his detailed autobiography, the Annales Queroni, is discovered by Dowager Queen Jehana in the secret library of Rhemuth Castle in 1128.

==== Hubert MacInnis ====
- Appearances: Camber the Heretic, The Harrowing of Gwynedd, King Javan's Year, The Bastard Prince

Hubert John William Valerian MacInnis is born in 876, the younger brother of Baron Manfred MacInnis. Hubert is ordained a priest in 896, and he spends the next nine years in the service of Earl Murdoch of Carthane. He becomes an itinerant bishop in 909, and is elected Auxiliary Bishop of Rhemuth in 916, at which point he is appointed as a tutor to the sons of King Cinhil Haldane. Following Cinhil's death in 917, Hubert serves as one of the Regents for King Alroy.

Throughout his appearances in the series, Hubert is portrayed as an evil and conniving antagonist. When Alister Cullen is elected Archbishop of Valoret and Primate of All Gwynedd, Hubert and the other Regents launch a violent wave of anti-Deryni persecutions. Once Cullen and his supporters are killed or exiled, the remaining bishops are forced to vote again, and Hubert is elected Primate of All Gwynedd. Over the next eleven years, he is one of the most powerful men in the kingdom, using his vast ecclesiastical and secular powers to persecute Deryni and control the throne. He refuses to permit King Alroy Haldane to wield the power of the crown, and he attempts to pass over Prince Javan after Alroy's death. Hubert eventually conceives and executes a plot against Javan in 921, successfully murdering the king and placing Prince Rhys Michael Haldane upon the throne. For the next six years, Hubert and the other lords of state rule the realm, reducing Rhys Michael to a helpless puppet king. However, the king appoints several new Regents for his son before his death in 928, and the new Regents arrest Hubert and his cohorts for their various crimes. Hubert is deposed from office and imprisoned in a distant abbey, and he dies at the age of 53 the following year.

==== Manfred MacInnis ====
- Appearances: Camber the Heretic, The Harrowing of Gwynedd, King Javan's Year, The Bastard Prince

Manfred Colquhoun Festil Tarquin MacInnis is the elder brother of Archbishop Hubert MacInnis and one of the primary antagonists of the Heirs of Saint Camber trilogy. Born in 875, Manfred regains his family estate when King Cinhil Haldane restores Manfred's hereditary title of Baron of Marlor. After Cinhil's death in 917, Manfred is appointed to the Royal Council of King Alroy, and is later created Earl of Culdi after the MacRorie family is attainted. The following year, Manfred replaces Duke Ewan I MacEwan of Claibourne as a Lord Regent and Earl Marshal of Gwynedd, but he resigns the latter office in 919. In 921, Manfred and his colleagues launch a coup against King Javan Haldane, and Manfred's own troops are among those who overwhelm and kill the young king. Six years later, Manfred accompanies the royal party of King Rhys Michael Haldane to Eastmarch. When the king is injured during the expedition, it is Manfred who insists on a course of treatment that ultimately results in Rhys Michael's death. After the king's funeral, during a confrontation with the newly appointed Regents, Manfred is slain by Earl Rhun von Horthy of Sheele, who is acting under a mental compulsion placed by Rhys Michael before his death. Manfred marries once, fathering two children, and he is 53 years old at the time of his death.

==== Ansel MacRorie ====
- Appearances: Camber of Culdi, Saint Camber, Camber the Heretic, The Harrowing of Gwynedd, King Javan's Year, The Bastard Prince

Ansel Irial MacRorie is born in 900, the grandson of Earl Camber MacRorie of Culdi and the younger brother of Lord Davin MacRorie. Ansel and Davin are the sons of Camber's eldest son and heir, Lord Cathan MacRorie, whose murder in Camber of Culdi precipitates the Haldane Restoration. After Davin's death in 917, Ansel is attainted and outlawed by the Regents of King Alroy, forcing him to go into hiding to avoid arrest. He accompanies his aunt, Lady Evaine MacRorie Thuryn on her journey to safety later that year, and he is inducted into the Camberian Council early in 918. Ansel spends much of the following years working closely with Lord Jesse MacGregor, as the two exiled Deryni secretly work with the rest of the Council to protect Deryni and overthrow the human lords of state, often personally enacting the plans and decisions made by the Council as a whole. Although he is blamed for both the kidnapping of Prince Rhys Michael Haldane and the murder of King Javan Haldane, both plots were actually executed by the human lords of state. In 928, Ansel and Jesse covertly monitor the royal expedition into Eastmarch, but they are unable to provide any direct assistance to King Rhys Michael. However, after the king's death, Ansel and Jesse are instrumental in organizing the quick response of the newly appointed Regents. Ansel accompanies them to Rhemuth, and he is present when the lords of state are captured or killed. Ansel eventually dies at the age of 48 in 948, having married once and fathered three children.

==== Camber MacRorie ====
Camber Kyriell MacRorie is the seventh Earl of Culdi, a Gwyneddan noble who plays a pivotal role in the Haldane Restoration of 904. He is an extremely powerful Deryni mage whose arcane abilities and knowledge are legendary. Although he was canonized by the Holy Church of Gwynedd shortly after his death, the Church later rescinded his sainthood and declared him a heretic.

==== Joram MacRorie ====
Joram Angus MacRorie is the son of Earl Camber MacRorie, and a priest and knight of the Order of Saint Michael. He plays a central role in the Haldane Restoration, and later becomes the primary leader of the secret Deryni resistance movement.

==== Murdoch ====
- Appearances: Saint Camber, Camber the Heretic, The Harrowing of Gwynedd, King Javan's Year

Murdoch is one of the primary antagonists in the various novels in which he appears. He successfully petitions King Cinhil Haldane for the restoration of his family lands, and he is created Baron of Carthane in 905, though he is later promoted to an earl in 907. Following Cinhil's death in 917, Murdoch becomes one of the Regents for young King Alroy and is appointed to the Royal Council. In addition, it is Murdoch's successful alteration to Cinhil's will that enables the human members of the council to force almost all Deryni from court. On Christmas Eve of that year, when the synod of bishops elects the Deryni Bishop Alister Cullen as Archbishop Primate of All Gwynedd, Murdoch is the driving force behind the Regents' plan to strike at numerous religious and noble Deryni houses. In 918, he is directly responsible for the betrayal and murder of his fellow Regent, Duke Ewan I MacEwan of Claibourne, and he quickly establishes a reputation for being particularly brutal and harsh with the hostage Deryni who work for the Regents. After the coronation of King Javan Haldane in 921, Murdoch is accused of Ewan's murder and challenged to trial by combat by Ewan's younger brother, Earl Hrorik II of Eastmarch. Hrorik mortally wounds Murdoch during the battle, but he refuses to finish the kill, preferring to let Murdoch die painfully over the next several hours. Murdoch dies at the age of 44, having married once and fathered four children.

==== Tavis O'Neill ====
- Appearances: Camber the Heretic, The Harrowing of Gwynedd, King Javan's Year

Tavis O'Neill is born in 879, and he receives training as Healer from both the Gabrilites and the Varnarites. By 917, he has been appointed the personal Healer to Prince Javan Haldane, and he quickly forms a close bond with the clubfooted prince. After the death of King Cinhil Haldane in 917, Tavis is one of the few Deryni who is not forced out of the court, mostly because of his close friendship with Javan. However, Tavis is attacked by a group of rogue Deryni in May, and they cut off his right hand as punishment for allegedly assisting the human-controlled court. During the course of his recovery, Tavis discovers that Javan is beginning to exhibit the early stages of the Haldane potential, and the two become determined to discover the source of Javan's fledgling powers. In December, Tavis and Javan capture Rhys and drug him to force his cooperation, enabling Tavis to probe Rhys' mind. Not only does Tavis uncover additional information about Javan's powers, but he also discovers that he shares Rhys' ability to block Deryni powers. Shortly thereafter, as the Regents of King Alroy unleash a violent wave of anti-Deryni persecutions, Tavis is finally forced to leave Javan and join with the outlawed Deryni rebels.

Tavis is inducted into the Camberian Council in 918, and he spends much of the next several years working closely with Revan and the Council's covert baptizer cult. In an effort to protect Deryni from the persecutions, Tavis covertly blocks their powers while Revan baptizes them, making the process appear to be a divine miracle. Tavis is briefly reunited with Javan prior to Javan's coronation in 921, and Tavis plays a minor role in fully activating Javan's powers. The following year, the former Regents launch an assault against both Javan and the baptizer cult, and Tavis, Javan, and Revan are all slain in the massacre. Tavis dies in 922 at the age of 43.

==== Revan ====
- Appearances: Camber of Culdi, Saint Camber, Camber the Heretic, The Harrowing of Gwynedd, King Javan's Year

Revan is a thirteen-year-old peasant boy at the time of his first appearance in Camber of Culdi, a carpenter's apprentice who is taken prisoner by King Imre Furstán-Festil after the murder of a Deryni lord. When Lord Cathan MacRorie, the son and heir of Earl Camber MacRorie of Culdi, is allowed to save only one of the fifty hostages, he chooses Revan. After Cathan's death shortly thereafter, Revan is taken in by Cathan's sister, Lady Evaine MacRorie Thuryn, who sees to his protection and education. Revan eventually becomes a trusted and valued member of the Thuryn household, serving as both a confidential clerk and a tutor to Evaine's children.

In 917, Revan agrees to perform a dangerous mission on behalf of the Camberian Council. He joins an anti-Deryni cult and takes on the role of a charismatic and humble preacher, quickly gaining a devout following within the cult. After over a year of preparation, Revan eventually begins performing baptisms that appear to remove Deryni powers. Although Revan appears to be the focus of the operation, he actually works closely with several Deryni operatives who are covertly blocking the powers of the Deryni subjects before Revan actually touches them, usually Tavis O'Neill or Sylvan O'Sullivan. Revan leads his baptizer cult for several years, successfully removing the powers of countless Deryni, thus protecting them from the persecutions. In 922, the lords of state launch a coup against King Javan Haldane while he is visiting Revan's cult, and Revan, Tavis, and the king are all slain in the massacre. Revan dies in 922 at the age of 31.

==== Rhun ====
- Appearances: Camber the Heretic, The Harrowing of Gwynedd, King Javan's Year, The Bastard Prince

Rhun von Horthy is born in 885, the eldest son and heir of the Baron of Horthness. In 917, he and his colleagues succeed in covertly altering the will of King Cinhil Haldane, enabling them to force nearly all Deryni from court after the king's death a short time later. He serves as one of the Regents for young King Alroy, and he leads a series a military maneuvers late into December of that year. When the synod of bishops attempts to elect the Deryni Bishop Alister Cullen as Archbishop Primate of All Gwynedd, Rhun orders the army to sack several religious and noble Deryni houses. He personally leads the forces that destroy the motherhouse of the Order of Saint Gabriel. Afterwards, Rhun is created Earl of Sheele as a reward for his bloody service.

Known as "Rhun the Ruthless", he spends the next several years as one of the most prominent men in the kingdom, brutally wielding his authority to crush Deryni and further secure his power. In 922, he participates in the coup against King Javan Haldane when his forces join in an attack on the royal party, eventually resulting in a bloody massacre and the king's death. Six years later, he joins royal expedition to Eastmarch, primarily to ensure the peaceful cooperation of King Rhys Michael Haldane. Rhys Michael clashes with Rhun on several occasions during the journey, but Rhun's brutal threats succeed in securing the king's unwilling cooperation. Although Rhys Michael eventually plants several compulsions in Rhun's mind, Rhun is ultimately unable to protect the wounded king, who dies from poor medical treatment ordered by Earl Manfred MacInnis. After Rhys Michael's funeral, Rhun and his colleagues are confronted by the newly appointed Regents. Still under Rhys Michael's mental compulsions, Rhun savagely murders Manfred and seizes the four-year-old King Owain Haldane. However, the compulsions prohibit Rhun from harming the young king, and Rhun is soon killed by the king's uncle, Sir Cathan Drummond. Rhun dies at the age of 43 in 928, having married twice and fathered four children.

==== Tammaron ====
- Appearances: Saint Camber, Camber the Heretic, The Harrowing of Gwynedd, King Javan's Year, The Bastard Prince

Tammaron Fitz-Arthur is one of the primary antagonists of Camber the Heretic and the Heirs of Saint Camber trilogy. Born in 874, he enjoys a successful career as a minister at the court of King Blaine Furstán-Festil, but leaves active service during the reign of Blaine's successor, King Imre. Tammaron returns to court after the Haldane Restoration of 904, and King Cinhil Haldane appoints him to the Royal Council in 905. Following Cinhil's death in 917, Tammaron becomes one of the Regents for young King Alroy. Secret modifications made to Cinhil's will by Tammaron, Earl Murdoch of Carthane, and Baron Rhun von Horthy of Horthness enable the Regents to force almost all Deryni from court, at which point Tammaron is appointed Lord Chancellor of Gwynedd. Although he is occasionally described as being the most decent of the five Regents in the novels, Tammaron firmly supports all efforts to persecute Deryni and solidify the power of his colleagues over the following years. In 922, he participates in the coup to overthrow King Javan Haldane by taking Prince Rhys Michael Haldane and his wife prisoner and murdering several of the prince's closest aides. In 928, after Rhys Michael's death on an expedition to Eastmarch, Tammaron and his colleagues are confronted by the newly appointed Regents. Tammaron briefly takes Queen Michaela Drummond hostage to ensure his safety, but Michaela uses her Deryni powers to kill Tammaron. Tammaron dies at the age of 53, having married once and fathered four children.

==== Evaine MacRorie Thuryn ====
Evaine Elspeth Jessamyn MacRorie Thuryn is the daughter of Earl Camber MacRorie of Culdi and a highly trained Deryni adept. She plays a central role in the Haldane Restoration and the socio-political events that follow it.

==== Rhys Thuryn ====
Rhys Malachy Thuryn is a highly talented Deryni Healer and the son-in-law of Earl Camber MacRorie of Culdi. Through his connection to the MacRorie family, he plays a central role in the Haldane Restoration, and he is later a founding member of the Camberian Council. In addition, he is the inventor of a Deryni meditation practice known as "the Thuryn technique."

=== 12th century ===
==== Denis Arilan ====
- Appearances: Deryni Rising, Deryni Checkmate, High Deryni, The Bishop's Heir, The King's Justice, The Quest for Saint Camber, King Kelson's Bride, The Deryni Archives ("The Priesting of Arilan" and "The Knighting of Derry")

Denis Michael Arilan is born in 1083, the nephew of Lord Seisyll Arilan and the younger brother of Sir Jamyl Arilan. He studies for the priesthood from an early age, and he is ordained a priest in 1105, becoming the first Deryni to be successfully ordained in two centuries. Two years later, following Jamyl's death, Arilan is inducted into the Camberian Council, becoming the first cleric to sit on the Council in two hundred years. Arilan rises quickly at the court of Gwynedd, being appointed Confessor to King Brion Haldane in 1115 and elected Auxiliary Bishop of Rhemuth in 1118, at which point he is named to the king’s Royal Council. In 1121, he and several other bishops oppose Archbishop Edmund Loris's plan to place the Duchy of Corwyn under interdict, effectively splitting the Curia of Bishops. However, Arilan and his colleagues soon offer their support to King Kelson Haldane, and Arilan reveals his Deryni heritage to Kelson, Duke Alaric Morgan, Monsignor Duncan McLain, and Bishop Thomas Cardiel. When Kelson is challenged to a Duel Arcane by King Wencit Furstán of Torenth, Arilan takes the king and his allies to meet with the Camberian Council, securing the Council's mediation in the conflict. The following day, Arilan is standing by Kelson's side as the King of Gwynedd emerges victorious from the battle.

In 1122, Arilan is elected Bishop of Dhassa, though he remains a member of both the Camberian Council and Kelson's Royal Council. He participates in Kelson's wedding to Princess Sidana of Meara in 1124, but the ceremony ends in the bride's tragic murder. Later that year, Arilan assists Kelson in the arcane ritual to activate the Haldane potential of Prince Nigel Haldane, and he remains in Rhemuth during Kelson's military campaign in Meara to provide additional Deryni support for Nigel. The following year, after Kelson's supposed death and Nigel's collapse, Arilan, Morgan, and Duncan activate the Haldane potential of Nigel's son, Prince Conall. In 1128, Arilan travels with Kelson to Torenth, where he and other members of the Camberian Council attempt to unravel the political plots surrounding the Torenthi court. Following the formal enthronement of King Liam Lajos, Arilan serves as Gwynedd's primary ambassador to the Torenthi court. As of 1130, the 46-year-old Arilan is still a member of the Camberian Council, a member of the Royal Council of Gwynedd, and the Bishop of Dhassa.

==== Sean Lord Derry ====
- Appearances: Deryni Rising, Deryni Checkmate, High Deryni, The Bishop's Heir, The Quest for Saint Camber, King Kelson's Bride, The Deryni Archives ("The Knighting of Derry" and "Trial")

Sean Seamus O'Flynn is born in 1097, the eldest son and heir of Earl Seamus O'Flynn of Derry. He inherits the family title after the death of his father in 1106, attaining his legal majority five years later. Derry is knighted by King Brion Haldane shortly after his eighteenth birthday in 1115, and he soon becomes a trusted military aide the service of Duke Alaric Morgan of Corwyn. Derry and Morgan return to Rhemuth following Brion's death in 1120, and Derry is appointed to the Royal Council by Brion's son, Prince Kelson. While on a mission for Morgan the following year, Derry is captured by the traitorous Earl Bran Coris of Marley and turned over to King Wencit Furstán of Torenth, who uses his Deryni powers to place a series of compulsions in Derry's mind. Although Derry is rescued by Morgan, the compulsions eventually force him to betray Morgan and kidnap Coris' son. Realizing Derry is still under Wencit's control, Morgan removes Wencit's compulsions from Derry's mind.

Over the next several years, Derry becomes Morgan's lieutenant in Corwyn and Deputy Regent of Marley, seeing to many of the domestic matters that arise while Morgan is away from Corwyn. In 1128, he travels to Torenth with Kelson and Morgan, despite his lingering fear of Torenthi Deryni. While in Torenth, Derry is captured by Wencit's sister, Princess Morag Furstána, who re-activates the compulsions in Derry's mind and uses the hapless border lord to spy on the Gwyneddan court. Shortly thereafter, Morag is murdered by her exiled brother-in-law, Count Teymuraz Furstán, who takes over the compulsions in Derry's mind and eventually forces Derry to attempt murder. However, the attempt is unsuccessful, and Derry's mind is fully cleansed and healed by Prince Azim ibn Qais ibn Hassan ar-Rafiq, with assistance from Kelson and his cousin and fiancée Araxie Haldane.

==== Kelson Haldane ====
Kelson Cinhil Rhys Anthony Haldane is born in 1106 and is the twenty-sixth King of Gwynedd, ascending to the throne in the year 1120. He is the twenty-first member of the House of Haldane to wear the crown of Gwynedd, and the fifteenth consecutive Haldane to be king since the end of the Festillic Interregnum. He is the only child of King Brion Donal Cinhil Urien Haldane and Queen Jehana. Kelson inherits the Deryni potential from his father's Haldane line, as well as the natural abilities of the Deryni bloodline from his mother.

Kelson faces a Duel Arcane challenge from the Deryni sorceress Charissa at his coronation and manages to trigger his Haldane potential during the confrontation. Charissa, who engineered the death of Kelson's father, is defeated and his mother's heretofore unknown Deryni heritage is revealed.

==== Liam Lajos ====
- Appearances: The King's Justice, The Quest for Saint Camber, King Kelson's Bride

Liam Lajos II Lionel László Furstán d'Arjenol is born in 1114, the third son and fourth child of Duke Lionel II d'Arjenol and Princess Morag Furstána. In 1121, his elder brother Alroy Arion ascends to the throne of Torenth following the death of their uncle, King Wencit Furstán, but Alroy dies under suspicious circumstances shortly after attaining his legal majority in 1123. Liam then becomes King of Torenth, with his mother and his uncle, Duke Mahael, serving as his primary Regents. In 1124, the young Deryni monarch and his mother travel to the Gwyneddan capital of Rhemuth to formally acknowledge King Kelson Haldane as Overlord of Torenth, but Kelson decides to keep Liam and Morag in Gwynedd while he deals with a rebellion in Meara. Although Morag is later allowed to return to Torenth, Kelson keeps Liam in Gwynedd for the next four years, intending to both teach the young king the skills of statecraft he will eventually need and to expose him to Gwyneddan culture in an attempt to end the enmity between the two lands. In 1125, Liam is squired to Kelson's uncle, Prince Nigel Haldane, and the young king forms close friendships with Nigel's sons.

Liam reaches his legal majority in 1128, and he and Kelson travel to Torenth for Liam's formal enthronement as King of Torenth. During the ceremony, Liam is attacked by two of his uncles, Mahael and Count Teymuraz, who attempt to kill Liam and seize his power. However, Liam survives the assault and claims his rightful place as King of Torenth. Afterwards, Kelson releases Liam from his vassalage, restoring the independence of the Kingdom of Torenth and elevating Liam to an equal rank with Kelson. Liam returns to Gwynedd for a double royal wedding several weeks later, and returns yet again for Kelson's wedding the following week. In an effort to further secure peaceful relations between the two lands, Liam agrees to a betrothal with Nigel's daughter, Princess Eirian, later that year, with the marriage to take place when Eirian comes of age in 1138. In addition, Liam bestows the hand of his sister, Princess Stanisha, upon Nigel's youngest son, Prince Payne Haldane. As of 1130, the sixteen-year-old Liam is still King of Torenth and a close friend of King Kelson Haldane.

==== Edmund Loris ====
- Appearances: Deryni Rising, Deryni Checkmate, High Deryni, The Bishop's Heir, The King's Justice

Edmund Alfred Loris is born in 1064, and he is ordained a priest twenty years later. During his early ecclesiastical career, he earns a reputation for his fanatical hatred of Deryni, and he is rumored to allow violent and bloody persecutions to continue under his authority. He is elected Bishop of Stavenham in 1101, and is eventually elected Archbishop of Valoret and Primate of All Gwynedd in 1115. After the death of King Brion Haldane in 1120, Loris supports Queen Jehana's attempt to arrest the Deryni Duke Alaric Morgan of Corwyn, but Prince Kelson Haldane succeeds in freeing Morgan. In 1121, several months after Kelson's coronation, Loris convinces the Curia of Bishops to excommunicate Morgan and his cousin, Monsignor Duncan McLain, but his attempt to place Corwyn under interdict results in a split in the Curia. Loris continues to defy Kelson and oppose Morgan, forcing the young king to eventually place the archbishop under arrest. In 1122, the Curia of bishops formally strips Loris of his rank and privileges, sentencing him to imprisonment in a distant abbey. In late 1123, Loris manages to escape his captivity and joins forces with the Princess Caitrin Quinnell, the Mearan Pretender, in a joint effort to defeat Kelson. Loris focuses much of his hatred on Duncan McLain, who, as a Deryni bishop and duke, is the symbolic representation of everything that offends Loris. During the rebellion in 1124, Loris succeeds in capturing Duncan, and the former archbishop horribly tortures the Deryni priest. However, Kelson and Morgan arrive the following day with Gwyneddan army to rescue Duncan. The Mearan forces are defeated, and Loris is captured and once again placed in custody. Over a week later, after a brief ecclesiastical trial, Loris is convicted of treason, and Kelson hangs the former archbishop for his crimes. Loris dies at the age of 59 in 1124.

==== Dhugal MacArdry ====
Dhugal Ardry MacArdry is a close companion and trusted advisor of King Kelson Haldane of Gwynedd. As both the foster brother and blood brother of the king, Dhugal's relationship with Kelson provides the king with a friend who is much closer to his own age than his other colleagues, such as Alaric Morgan or Duncan McLain.

Dhugal is the legitimate son of Duncan McLain. His parents married secretly before Duncan took his priestly vows. Dhugal's mother dies shortly after he is born and until the events of The Bishop's Heir, Duncan is unaware that Dhugal is his son.

Like his father, Dhugal demonstrates that rare Deryni ability to heal.

==== Duncan McLain ====
Duncan Howard McLain is a Deryni priest and close confidant of King Kelson Haldane of Gwynedd. In addition, Duncan is the maternal cousin of Duke Alaric Morgan of Corwyn, another of Kelson's trusted advisors.

==== Alaric Morgan ====
Alaric Anthony Morgan is born in 1091 and is the seventh Duke of Corwyn and Lord General of the Royal Armies of Gwynedd. He is a close advisor and friend of both King Brion Haldane and King Kelson Haldane. In addition, he is the maternal cousin of Monsignor Duncan McLain.

Though considered a half-breed by the Camberian Council, Morgan demonstrates one of the rarest and most prized Deryni attributes; the ability to heal. He first discovers the ability by accident when his aide, Sean Lord Derry, is near fatally wounded in an assassination attempt. During Kelson Haldane's coronation, he manages to heal himself from a wound inflicted by Charissa's champion. Later, he heals Duncan McLain during a demonstration of his abilities gone awry to Warin de Grey.

==== Richenda ====
- Appearances: Deryni Checkmate, High Deryni, The Bishop's Heir, The King's Justice, The Quest for Saint Camber, King Kelson's Bride

Richenda Rayma Anisa of Rheljan is a highly trained Deryni adept born to the Baron of Rheljan in 1099. She marries Earl Bran Coris of Marley in 1116, but her husband is executed for treason by King Kelson Haldane in 1121. Following Bran's death, Kelson appoints Richenda as primary Regent for her son, Brendan Coris. In 1122, she marries Duke Alaric Morgan of Corwyn, but, due to her previous marriage to a convicted traitor, she experiences some difficulty earning the support of Morgan's officers. Nonetheless, her significant arcane power and training are openly welcomed by both Morgan and Kelson. In 1124, she assists Kelson in activating the Haldane potential of his uncle and heir, Prince Nigel Haldane. In addition, she is given the responsibility of confining Princess Morag Furstána during the Torenthi princess' confinement in Rhemuth. In 1128, Richenda attempts to convince Kelson to stop pining for Rothana of Nur Hallaj, providing a unique perspective that Kelson had not considered. Several weeks later, she assists in the resolution of several domestic issues at court. Through various familial marriages, Richenda is a cousin to Rothana, and the great-niece of Archbishop Thomas II Cardiel. As of 1130, the 31-year-old Richenda has married twice and borne five children.

==== Rothana ====
- Appearances: The King's Justice, The Quest for Saint Camber, King Kelson's Bride

R'thana Ayesha Kamila bint Hakim ar-Rafiq is born a royal Deryni princess in 1107, the daughter of the Sovereign Prince of Nur Hallaj. She receives her Deryni training from her uncle, Prince Azim, throughout her youth, and she eventually chooses a religious life. She is serving as a novice at Saint Brigid's Abbey in 1124 when it is attacked by rebellious Mearan forces. Shortly thereafter, she meets King Kelson Haldane of Gwynedd, who offers his protection to the devastated nuns of the abbey. Over the following year, a burgeoning romance blooms between Rothana and the king, and Rothana begins to question her religious vocation. Although the two eventually confess their feelings for each other, they agree to wait on any formal arrangements until Kelson returns from a religious quest. However, a tragic accident befalls the royal party and the king is believed to have been killed. Although devastated by the news, Rothana eventually agrees to marry Kelson's cousin, Prince Conall, in an attempt to preserve some of the dreams that she and Kelson had shared. By the time Kelson re-appears several weeks later, Rothana has already married Conall and become pregnant. Although Conall is soon executed for his treason, Rothana refuses to marry Kelson, believing she is no longer worthy of being his bride.

Over the next several years, Rothana and Kelson continue to pine for each other, but Rothana adamantly refuses to soften her stance. She pledges her son, Prince Albin, to the Church, and she joins the Servants of Saint Camber in 1127. The following year, she convinces Kelson to propose marriage to Princess Araxie Haldane, who, in turn, convinces Rothana to accept a place at court as the founder of a Deryni school. As of 1130, the 22-year-old Rothana remains a member of the Servants of Saint Camber, serving as a lay assistant to Bishop Duncan McLain, the Rector of the University of Saint Camber in Rhemuth.

== General sources ==
- Katherine Kurtz, Camber of Culdi, ISBN 0-345-24590-3
- Katherine Kurtz, Saint Camber, ISBN 0-345-27750-3
- Katherine Kurtz, Camber the Heretic, ISBN 0-345-33142-7
- Katherine Kurtz, The Harrowing of Gwynedd, ISBN 0-345-33259-8
- Katherine Kurtz, King Javan's Year, ISBN 0-345-33260-1
- Katherine Kurtz, The Bastard Prince, ISBN 0-345-33262-8
- Katherine Kurtz, In the King's Service, ISBN 0-441-01060-1
- Katherine Kurtz, Childe Morgan, ISBN 0-441-01282-5
- Katherine Kurtz, The King's Deryni, ISBN 978-0425276686
- Katherine Kurtz, Deryni Rising, ISBN 0-345-01981-4
- Katherine Kurtz, Deryni Checkmate, ISBN 0-345-22598-8
- Katherine Kurtz, High Deryni, ISBN 0-345-23485-5
- Katherine Kurtz, The Bishop's Heir, ISBN 0-345-31824-2
- Katherine Kurtz, The King's Justice, ISBN 0-345-31825-0
- Katherine Kurtz, The Quest for Saint Camber, ISBN 0-345-31826-9
- Katherine Kurtz, King Kelson's Bride, ISBN 0-441-00732-5
- Katherine Kurtz, The Deryni Archives, ISBN 0-345-32678-4
- Katherine Kurtz and Robert Reginald, Codex Derynianus (second edition), ISBN 1-887424-96-2
- Deryni FAQ
