= Saint Camber =

1978 novel by Katherine Kurtz

- Paperback Edition
- Author: Katherine Kurtz
- Cover artist: Darrell K. Sweet
- Language: English
- Series: The Legends of Camber of Culdi
- Genre: Fantasy
- Publisher: Del Rey Books
- Publication date: 1978
- Publication place: United States
- Media type: Print (Paperback & Hardcover)
- Pages: 365pp (first edition, hardcover)
- ISBN: 0-345-27750-3 (first edition, hardcover)
- OCLC: 4193682
- Dewey Decimal: 813/.5/4 s 813/.5/4
- LC Class: PS3561.U69 S25 1978
- Preceded by: Camber of Culdi
- Followed by: Camber the Heretic

Saint Camber is a historical fantasy novel by American-born author Katherine Kurtz. It was first published by Ballantine Books in 1978. It was the fifth of Kurtz' Deryni novels to be published, and the second book in her second Deryni trilogy, The Legends of Camber of Culdi. The latter trilogy serves as prequels to The Chronicles of the Deryni series that Kurtz wrote from 1970 to 1973, and it details the events that occurred two centuries before the Chronicles trilogy.

== Plot introduction ==
The novel is set in the land of Gwynedd, one of the fictional Eleven Kingdoms. Gwynedd itself is a medieval kingdom similar to the British Isles of the 10th century, with a powerful Holy Church (based on the Roman Catholic Church), and a feudal government ruled by a hereditary monarchy. The population of Gwynedd includes normal humans and Deryni, a race of people with inherent psychic and magical abilities. The novel begins six months after the conclusion of Camber of Culdi and is set around King Cinhil Haldane's efforts and those of his allies to secure the kingdom following the successful coup that overthrew the Deryni tyrant, King Imre Furstán-Festil. The former-priest-turned-king struggles with his conscience and his new responsibilities while Earl Camber MacRorie and his family engage in a dangerous and desperate plan to protect king and realm.

== Plot summary ==
The novel spans a time period of one and a half years, from June 905 to January 907. It begins as the allies and supporters of King Cinhil Haldane prepare to meet the invasion of Princess Ariella Furstána-Festila, the sister and lover of the deposed King Imre Furstán-Festil. Although Imre died in the coup that placed Cinhil on the throne, Ariella escaped to the neighboring kingdom of Torenth, where she has sought refuge with her relatives. Having given birth to Imre's bastard son, she now seeks to return to Gwynedd and retake the throne. She has been using magic to influence the weather, hoping to flood the plains and rivers of Gwynedd to facilitate the invasion of her army.

Cinhil's closest advisors are preparing to meet the invaders, but the king himself has become aloof and withdrawn since his ascension to the throne. He has become convinced that he sinned against God by giving up his priestly vows to become king, and he displays increasing hostility and antagonism toward Earl Camber MacRorie of Culdi, the Deryni adept most responsible for placing Cinhil on the throne. Throughout the preparations for battle and the march to the battlefield itself, Cinhil constantly clashes with the Deryni closest to him, lashing out angrily as his resentment toward Camber in particular and Deryni in general continues to grow. Although Cinhil seems to place slightly more trust in Alister Cullen, the Deryni Vicar General of the Michaelines, even Cullen is rebuffed when he makes overtures of friendship to the king.

The Gwyneddan army meets Ariella's invaders on the plain of Iomaire, and the two forces clash the following day. Despite being outnumbered, Cinhil's army emerges victorious and wins the day. Following the battle, Camber and his son, Joram, discover the scene of Ariella's final stand. While attempting to flee the battle, Ariella had been confronted by Alister Cullen and the two fought a brutal battle that claimed both of their lives. Camber soon realizes that Cullen's death will only further alienate the king, as Cullen enjoyed more of Cinhil's trust than any other Deryni. Without Cullen to temper Cinhil's growing mistrust of Deryni, Camber fears that an anti-Deryni backlash might sweep through the kingdom. Camber then convinces Joram to help him switch shapes with the slain Cullen, believing that he can do more to help Cinhil and the kingdom as Alister Cullen than he can as Camber MacRorie. Joram initially resists the idea, but eventually concedes to his father's wishes. He helps Camber switch appearances with Cullen and then returns to the royal camp, bearing the body of a slain man bearing the appearance of Camber MacRorie. With the exceptions of Joram and Camber's son-in-law, Lord Rhys Thuryn, the rest of the world believes that Camber has died and Cullen has lived.

As the army returns to Valoret, Camber does his best to act out the role of the new persona he has adopted. Although he managed to retrieve some of Cullen's memories, his inability to assimilate those memories in safety is beginning to affect his health. Shortly after returning to Valoret, Camber is able to begin the process of assimilating Cullen's memories with the assistance of Rhys, Joram, and his daughter Evaine, but the procedure is interrupted by Cinhil. Unable to stop the procedure, Camber's disguise briefly slips away and the king witnesses the momentary change. Shocked and confused, Cinhil orders that nobody speak of the incident and flees the room.

Once in full possession of Cullen's remaining memories, Camber settles into his new identity with increased confidence. However, his former squire, Lord Guaire d'Arliss, remains despondent over Camber's supposed death. Taking pity on the man, Camber sheds his disguise and visits Guaire late one night, convincing him to cease his mourning. Guaire believes the visit is just a dream, but he takes heart from it and immediately asks to enter the service of the man he knows as Alister Cullen.

Camber must next deal with a matter of conscience. Cullen was due to become Bishop of Grecotha before his death, but Camber knows that he will be breaking ecclesiastical law by pretending to be a priest. The night before Camber's consecration as a bishop, Joram convinces him to legitimize his status and be ordained as a priest. Camber reveals the truth of his identity to his old friend Archbishop Anscom, and Anscom agrees to perform the ceremony. The following morning, the newly ordained Camber is consecrated as Bishop of Grecotha.

Camber spends much of the next year in Grecotha and Valoret. The friendship that Cullen offered Cinhil is finally accepted, and the king and the bishop become very close. Believing he is finally free of Camber's influence, Cinhil finally seems to resolve his inner conflict and soon begins to evolve into an independent king. The potential that Camber observed in Cinhil before the Restoration is finally realized, and Cinhil starts to take an active role in governing the realm. Camber's desperate gamble appears to have paid off, as Cinhil shows more and more signs of becoming the true king of the realm.

However, much to the surprise of Camber and his family, Camber's supposed death has resulted in more of a public impact than they ever expected. Grateful to Camber for his central role in the Restoration, some people have begun to venerate his memory, with some going so far as to form small cults dedicated to the belief that Camber had been a saint. Fully aware of the depth of their deception, Camber and his kin are horrified by these developments. Nonetheless, they cannot risk discovery of the truth by opposing such beliefs too vehemently or publicly. In an effort to ensure that their secret remains hidden, Joram and Rhys move Cullen's body out of Camber's tomb in August 906.

Archbishop Anscom assures Camber that he will not allow any efforts to canonize Camber succeed, but Anscom died in September. The following month, Anscom's successor, Archbishop Jaffray, receives a formal request to canonize Camber MacRorie. During the ecclesiastical court that follows, Camber and his family are forced to remain silent, unwilling to reveal the truth that Camber is actually sitting in the very room where the court is determining his sanctity. Guaire relates the tale of Camber's visit, but he now believes that the event was actually a miracle. When Camber's tomb is revealed to be empty, Joram attempts to provide a legitimate excuse. However, his efforts to end the court are unsuccessful, and his father's empty tomb is also classified as a miracle.

That night, Cinhil confesses to Camber that he has been secretly performing the rites of his former priestly vocation, even going so far as to celebrate Mass in private. Although stunned by this revelation, Camber realizes that Cinhil's illicit actions have served to soothe the king's tortured conscience, giving him a peace of mind that has enabled him to grow and develop as a ruler. Feeling that he has already inflicted too much misery upon Cinhil, Camber ultimately forgives Cinhil and promises to keep the king's secret.

The following day, Cinhil is called as a witness before the ecclesiastical court. Although unwilling to get involved in the procedure, Cinhil reluctantly describes seeing Camber's face come over Bishop Cullen shortly after Camber's death. Unable to provide a logical explanation for the event, the court can only agree that Camber MacRorie somehow returned after death to help Alister Cullen. Believing it has evidence of three miracles, the court soon canonizes Camber MacRorie. Camber himself is helpless to stop the chain of events, and can only watch in silence. The novel ends shortly after the new year, as Cinhil and Camber examine a statue of "Saint Camber" that has been erected. As Cinhil leaves, he is still unaware that the man at his side is actually Camber MacRorie.

== Characters ==
- Earl Camber MacRorie: Earl of Culdi
- King Cinhil Haldane: King of Gwynedd
- Father Alister Cullen: Vicar General of the Michaelines
- Father Joram MacRorie: Michaeline priest and knight, son of Camber MacRorie
- Lady Evaine MacRorie Thuryn: daughter of Camber MacRorie, wife of Rhys Thuryn
- Lord Rhys Thuryn: Healer, husband of Evaine MacRorie
- Lord Jebediah d'Alcara: Grand Master of the Michaelines
- Princess Ariella Furstána-Festila: former Princess of Gwynedd, sister and lover of King Imre Furstán-Festil
- Lord Guaire d'Arliss: squire to Camber MacRorie
- Dom Queron Kinevan: Gabrilite priest and Healer
- Archbishop Anscom de Trevas: Archbishop of Valoret and Primate of All Gwynedd

== Awards and nominations ==
In 1979, Saint Camber ranked 18th in an annual poll of Locus magazine readers, placing it between Michael Moorcock's Gloriana and C.J. Cherryh's The Faded Sun: Shon'jir. (The poll was won by Vonda N. McIntyre for her novel, Dreamsnake.)

Saint Camber was also a finalist for the 1979 Gandalf Award for Book-Length Fantasy, an award determined by the members of the World Science Fiction Convention. The other finalists were Roger Zelazny's The Courts of Chaos, Michael Moorcock's Gloriana, and Stephen King's The Stand. The award was won by Anne McCaffrey for her novel, The White Dragon.

== Release details ==
- 1978, USA, Ballantine Books ISBN 0-345-27750-3, Hardcover (First edition)
- 1979, USA, Del Rey Books ISBN 0-345-25952-1, Pub date 12 August 1979, Paperback
- 1981, USA, Del Rey Books ISBN 0-345-30220-6, Pub date 12 October 1981, Paperback
- 1982, USA, Del Rey Books ISBN 0-345-30862-X, Pub date 12 July 1982, Paperback
- 1985, UK, Century Publishing ISBN 0-7126-0897-4, Pub date 24 October 1985, Paperback
- 1987, UK, Arrow Books ISBN 0-09-948110-3, Paperback
- 1987, USA, Del Rey Books ISBN 0-345-34768-4, Pub date 12 August 1987, Paperback
