= King Kelson's Bride =

Historical fantasy novel by Katherine Kurtz

- Hardcover edition
- Author: Katherine Kurtz
- Cover artist: Jon Sullivan
- Language: English
- Series: The Deryni Cycle
- Genre: Fantasy
- Publisher: Ace Books
- Publication date: 2000
- Publication place: United States
- Media type: Print (Paperback & Hardcover)
- Pages: 387 (first edition, hardcover)
- ISBN: 0-441-00732-5 (first edition, hardcover)
- OCLC: 42454290
- Dewey Decimal: 813/.54 21
- LC Class: PS3561.U69 K49 2000
- Preceded by: The Bastard Prince (publication date), The Quest for Saint Camber (literary chronology)
- Followed by: In the King's Service (next published)

King Kelson's Bride is a historical fantasy novel by American-born author Katherine Kurtz. It was first published by Ace Books in 2000. It was the thirteenth of Kurtz' Deryni novels to be published, and the only novel in the series that was not part of a trilogy. In terms of the series' internal literary chronology, King Kelson's Bride directly follows the events of the third Deryni trilogy, the Histories of King Kelson. The next trilogy to be published, the Childe Morgan series, is a direct prequel to the first Deryni series, the Chronicles of the Deryni.

== Plot introduction ==
The novel is set in the land of Gwynedd, one of the fictional Eleven Kingdoms. Gwynedd itself is a medieval kingdom similar to the British Isles of the 12th century, with a powerful Holy Church (based on the Roman Catholic Church), and a feudal government ruled by a hereditary monarchy. The population of Gwynedd includes both humans and Deryni, a race of people with inherent psychic and magical abilities who have been persecuted, oppressed and suppressed for two centuries. The novel begins almost three years after the conclusion of The Quest for Saint Camber, as King Kelson Haldane prepares to make a dangerous journey into the heart of the neighboring kingdom of Torenth. While attempting to survive a web of deceit and betrayal at a foreign court, Kelson must secure his own throne by finally choosing a royal bride.

== Plot summary ==
The plot of King Kelson's Bride spans a period of two and a half months, from late June to mid-August 1128. The novel opens in Torenth, where Princess Morag Furstána, Duke Mahael II of Arjenol, and Count Teymuraz of Brustarkia discuss the marriage prospects of both King Liam Lajos II and King Kelson Haldane of Gwynedd. At the same time, the Camberian Council also discusses Kelson's potential brides while also worrying about Kelson's upcoming journey to Torenth.

In Rhemuth, Kelson meets privately with Princess Rothana of Nur Hallaj after attending the wedding of his former squire. Despite professing his continuing love for her, Rothana once again refuses to marry the king. In her place, she urges Kelson to marry his cousin, Princess Araxie Haldane. In addition, she tells Kelson of the growing attraction between Prince Rory Haldane and Lady Noelie Ramsay. Although heartbroken by Rothana's refusal, Kelson agrees to consider her advice.

Two days later, Kelson departs for Torenth. For the past four years, Kelson has held King Liam Lajos II of Torenth at his court in Rhemuth, both to protect the young king from his ambitious family and to teach him the art of statecraft. However, Liam has now reached his legal majority and must return to his own land to take up his throne. Kelson is accompanied by Duke Alaric Morgan of Corwyn, Duke Dhugal MacArdry McLain of Cassan, Bishop Denis Arilan of Dhassa, and Liam's uncle, Count Mátyás. The royal party stops briefly in Coroth, where Morgan's wife, Duchess Richenda, urges Kelson to abandon his pursuit of Rothana. The next day, the royal party progresses to the court of the Hort of Orsal, where both Kelson and Liam are attacked by a pair of mind-altered assassins. Although slightly wounded, neither king is seriously injured in the assault. Later that night, Kelson meets with Araxie and the two are formally engaged.

As the royal party continues toward the Torenthi capital of Beldour, Liam confesses to Kelson that he is worried about the loyalty of his uncles Mahael and Teymuraz, though he is trusts Mátyás completely. Once in Beldour, Liam's trust is confirmed when Mátyás informs Kelson and Morgan that his brothers plan to kill Liam during the young king's coronation and place Mahael on the throne. Kelson agrees to help protect Liam, and Mátyás arranges for Kelson to take part in the magical ritual that will confirm Liam's power. For the next several days, Kelson practices the ritual with the assistance of Prince Azim, a relative of Rothana's and a member of the Camberian Council. When the ceremony finally occurs, Mátyás' prediction comes true and Mahael and Teymuraz attack Liam. However, Kelson and Mátyás successfully protect the young king, aided by Morag and the Torenthi Patriarch. Liam rips Mahael's mind and orders the traitor be impaled. During the conclusion of the ceremony, Kelson renounces his title of Overlord of Torenth and releases Liam from his vassalage, making the Kingdom of Torenth a sovereign and independent state once again. Afterwards, Teymuraz escapes from custody, and the lords of Gwynedd and Torenth later gather to discuss the threat he poses. That night, Morag captures Earl Sean O'Flynn of Derry and activates a latent magical link in his mind, allowing her to view his thoughts and experiences.

Concerned about Teymuraz, Kelson decides to return to Rhemuth immediately through the use of Transfer Portals. After a brief stop to retrieve Araxie and her family, most of the royal party transports to Rhemuth that night. As the search for Teymuraz continues over the next several weeks, Kelson turns his attention to more domestic matters. When the Ramsay family arrives for the marriage of Sir Brecon Ramsay and Princess Richelle Haldane, Kelson seeks to further secure the Mearan alliance by arranging a marriage between Rory and Noelie. Although initially reluctant to approve the marriage, Noelie's parents agree after Kelson follows Araxie's suggestion and grants them the Duchy of Laas. Shortly thereafter, Kelson establishes a new home for the Servants of Saint Camber in Rhemuth, and Araxie proves to be instrumental in healing old wounds within the royal family. She persuades Kelson's uncle, Prince Nigel Haldane, to accept and acknowledge the presence of his grandchildren at Court, and later convinces Rothana to remain in Rhemuth and allow her son to be raised as a royal prince.

In Torenth, Teymuraz attempts to plead his case to Morag. When she rebuffs him, he attacks her and rips her mind before killing her. With the knowledge he acquires from Morag, he gains control of the mental link with Derry. Several days later, he uses that link to wreak havoc in Rhemuth. After the double wedding of Brecon and Richelle and of Rory and Noelie, Teymuraz takes over Derry's mind and forces him to attack Mátyás. Araxie attempts to stop Derry, but Mátyás is severely wounded. Teymuraz once again escapes, but Morgan and Dhugal successfully Heal Mátyás' wound and save his life. Azim, Kelson, and Araxie remove the last foreign traces from Derry's mind, and Azim quickly leaves to pursue Teymuraz. One week later, Kelson and Araxie are married, and Araxie is formally crowned Queen of Gwynedd.

== Characters ==
- King Kelson Haldane: King of Gwynedd, Overlord of Torenth
- King Liam Lajos II Furstán: King of Torenth, squire to Prince Nigel Haldane
- Duke Alaric Morgan: Duke of Corwyn, King's Champion, Lord General of the Royal Armies, cousin of Duncan McLain, husband of Richenda
- Duke Dhugal MacArdry McLain: Duke of Cassan, Earl of Kierney and Transha, son of Duncan McLain
- Bishop Duncan McLain: Auxiliary Bishop of Rhemuth, father of Dhugal MacArdry, cousin of Alaric Morgan
- Bishop Denis Arilan: Bishop of Dhassa, member of the Camberian Council
- Count Mátyás Furstán-Komnénë: Count of Komnénë, brother of Duke Mahael and Count Teymuraz, uncle of King Liam Lajos II
- Duke Mahael Furstán d'Arjenol: Duke of Arjenol, Lord Regent of Torenth, brother of Teymuraz and Mátyás, uncle of King Liam Lajos II
- Count Teymuraz Furstán d'Arjenol-Brustarkia: Count of Brustarkia, Regent of Arjenol, brother of Duke Mahael and Count Mátyás, uncle of King Liam Lajos II
- Count Branyng von Furstán-Sostra: Count of Sostra
- Princess Araxie Haldane: Baroness of Dunluce, sister of Richelle Haldane, cousin of King Kelson
- Princess Rothana of Nur Hallaj: Princess of Nur Hallaj, widow of Prince Conall Haldane, niece of Prince Azim, distant cousin of Duchess Richenda
- Prince Azim ar-Rafiq: Prince of Nur Hallaj, Precentor of the Knights of the Anvil, uncle of Princess Rothana, member of the Camberian Council
- Duchess Richenda of Rheljan: Duchess of Corwyn, wife of Alaric Morgan, distant cousin of Princess Rothana
- Prince Nigel Haldane: Prince Regent of Gwynedd, Duke of Carthmoor, husband of Duchess Meraude, father of Prince Rory, uncle of King Kelson
- Duchess Meraude de Traherne: Duchess of Carthmoor, wife of Prince Nigel, aunt of King Kelson
- Prince Rory Haldane: Prince of Gwynedd, eldest surviving son of Prince Nigel and Duchess Meraude, cousin of King Kelson
- Princess Morag Furstána: Princess of Torenth, Lady Regent of Torenth, mother of King Liam Lajos II
- Earl Sean "Derry" O'Flynn: Earl of Derry, aide to Alaric Morgan
- Queen Jehana: Dowager Queen of Gwynedd, mother of King Kelson
- Lord Barrett de Laney: member of the Camberian Council
- Sir Jolyon Ramsay-Quinnell: Prince of Meara, husband of Lady Oksana, father of Brecon and Noelie

== Awards and nominations ==
In 2001, King Kelson's Bride was ranked 19th in an annual poll of fantasy novels by Locus magazine readers, placing it in a tie with P. D. Cacek's Canyons. The novels ranked one spot behind J. K. Rowling's Harry Potter and the Goblet of Fire, and one spot ahead of both J. Gregory Keyes's Empire of Unreason and Robin McKinley's Spindle's End. The poll was won by George R.R. Martin for his novel, A Storm of Swords.

== Release details ==
- 2000, USA, Ace Books ISBN 0-441-00732-5, Pub date 1 June 2000, Hardcover (first edition)
- 2001, USA, Ace Books ISBN 0-441-00827-5, Pub date 3 July 2001, Paperback
