= The Bishop's Heir =

1984 fantasy novel by Katherine Kurtz

- Dust-jacket illustration by Darrell K. Sweet for The Bishop's Heir
- Author: Katherine Kurtz
- Cover artist: Darrell K. Sweet
- Language: English
- Series: The Histories of King Kelson
- Genre: Fantasy
- Publisher: Del Rey Books
- Publication date: 1984
- Publication place: United States
- Media type: Print (hardback & paperback)
- Pages: xvii, 346 (first edition, hardcover)
- ISBN: 0-345-31824-2 (first edition, hardcover)
- OCLC: 10506380
- Dewey Decimal: 813/.54 19
- LC Class: PS3561.U69 B5 1984
- Preceded by: Camber the Heretic
- Followed by: The King's Justice

The Bishop's Heir is a fantasy novel by American-born author Katherine Kurtz. It was first published by Del Rey Books in 1984. It was the seventh of Kurtz's Deryni novels to be published, and the first book in her third Deryni trilogy, The Histories of King Kelson. Although The Legends of Camber of Culdi trilogy was published immediately prior to the Histories trilogy, The Bishop's Heir is a direct sequel to Kurtz's first Deryni series, The Chronicles of the Deryni.

== Plot introduction ==
The novel is set in the land of Gwynedd, one of the fictional Eleven Kingdoms. Gwynedd itself is a medieval kingdom similar to the British Isles of the 12th century, with a powerful Holy Church (based on the Roman Catholic Church), and a feudal government ruled by a hereditary monarchy. The population of Gwynedd includes both humans and Deryni, a race of people with inherent psychic and magical abilities who have been brutally persecuted and suppressed for over two centuries. The novel begins over two years after the conclusion of High Deryni, shortly after the seventeenth birthday of King Kelson Haldane. As a recurring political rivalry threatens to erupt into open rebellion, Kelson must face a dangerous combination of new and old foes who rise up against him.

== Plot summary ==
The Bishop's Heir details the events of a period of time lasting roughly a month and a half, beginning in late November 1123 and ending in early January 1124. The novel begins as the Curia of Bishops meets in Culdi to choose the successor to the deceased Bishop of Meara. The selection of the next bishop is a delicate matter, as the Mearans have made several attempts to secede from Gwynedd over the past century. King Kelson Haldane addresses the assembled clerics, then departs to make a survey of the local barons. Shortly thereafter, Kelson is reunited with Lord Dhugal MacArdry, an old friend who he has not seen since before his coronation, and the king decides to visit Dhugal's father, Earl Caulay MacArdry of Transha.

While visiting Transha, Kelson learns more about Princess Caitrin Quinnell, the Mearan Pretender. Descended from the ancient line of Mearan rulers, Caitrin is determined to establish herself as queen of a free and independent Meara, a land which has been ruled by Gwynedd for over a century. However, Kelson is forced to return to Culdi after Duke Alaric Morgan contacts him and informs him that Duncan McLain has been attacked and wounded. Upon returning to Culdi, Kelson acknowledges the election of Bishop Henry Istelyn, who has been chosen as the new bishop of Meara.

Shortly after Kelson returns to his capital of Rhemuth, Dhugal is captured while attempting to stop the escape of Edmund Loris, the former Archbishop of Valoret who was imprisoned for his past treason. Loris takes Dhugal to the Mearan city of Ratharkin, where he places both Dhugal and Istelyn in confinement. When the news of Loris' escape and Dhugal's capture reaches Kelson, the king decides to make a daring winter raid on Ratharkin.

Caitrin arrives in Ratharkin, accompanied by her children and her husband, Dhugal's uncle Sicard MacArdry. Although Istelyn refuses to assist Loris and Caitrin in their treason, Dhugal pretends to agree, hoping to find a way to warn Kelson. He eventually manages to escape Ratharkin, taking his cousin Sidana prisoner as he flees. Dhugal is rescued by Kelson's approaching forces, and Sidana's younger brother, Llewell, is also captured. Kelson gives Sicard until Christmas to surrender Loris, then returns to Rhemuth with Caitrin's two youngest children as hostages.

Upon returning to Rhemuth, Kelson eventually bows to the pressure of his advisors and agrees to marry Sidana if her mother refuses to surrender, hoping to avert open rebellion by joining the two royal lines. A short time later, when Duncan is consecrated a bishop, the power of the ceremony nearly overwhelms Dhugal, who possesses mental shields that no human should have. When Christmas finally arrives, Caitrin's messenger brings Istelyn's severed head to court, openly defying the orders of the king.

Although reluctant to marry a girl he barely knows and who has been raised to hate him, Kelson nevertheless follows through on his promise and asks Sidana to marry him. Sidana reluctantly agrees, but Llewell is furious at the possibility of his sister marrying his enemy. Two weeks of preparations ensue, during which time both Kelson and Sidana try to adjust to the realities of their approaching nuptials. On the morning of the wedding, Duncan recognizes a cloak clasp that Dhugal is wearing, which is the same clasp that Duncan gave his wife many years ago. Duncan tells the tale of his unusual marriage to Dhugal's mother, and Morgan uses his powers to confirm that Duncan is Dhugal's natural father. Realizing that he is part-Deryni, Dhugal is finally able to lower his shields, and father and son quickly exchange memories of their lives during their time apart.

A short time later, Kelson and Sidana ride through Rhemuth to the castle, where the entire court waits to witness the marriage of their king and their new queen. Kelson and Sidana exchange their vows as man and wife, but the ceremony is suddenly interrupted when Llewell slashes his sister's throat, making a final desperate attempt to prevent the wedding. Morgan and Duncan frantically try to save Sidana, but she dies almost instantly. Stunned and horrified, Kelson can do nothing but hold the body of his dead bride and weep.

== Characters ==
Cover of a later paperback edition.

- King Kelson Haldane: King of Gwynedd
- Duke Alaric Morgan: Duke of Corwyn, Lord General of the Royal Armies, and King's Champion
- Monsignor Duncan McLain: Duke of Cassan, Earl of Kierney, King's Confessor
- Lord Dhugal MacArdry: Master of Transha and Tanist of Clan MacArdry
- Prince Nigel Haldane: Prince of Gwynedd, Duke of Carthmoor, uncle of King Kelson
- Archbishop Bradene: Archbishop of Valoret and Primate of All Gwynedd
- Archbishop Thomas Cardiel: Archbishop of Rhemuth
- Bishop Denis Arilan: Bishop of Dhassa and member of the Camberian Council
- Bishop Henry Istelyn: Bishop of Meara
- Archbishop Edmund Loris: former archbishop of Valoret and Primate of All Gwynedd
- Princess Caitrin Quinnell: Pretender of Meara
- Lord Sicard MacArdry: husband of Caitrin Quinnell and uncle of Dhugal MacArdry
- Prince Ithel MacArdry Quinnell: Prince of Meara, eldest son and heir of the Mearan Pretender
- Princess Sidana MacArdry Quinnell: Princess of Meara, daughter of the Mearan Pretender
- Prince Llewell MacArdry Quinnell: Prince of Meara, younger son of the Mearan Pretender
- Father Judhael Quinnell: nephew of the Mearan Pretender

== Reception ==
In White Dwarf #65, David Langford commented, "Overall: a straight historical novel in plastic fantasy disguise. Brutally inconclusive ending, two sequels to follow." Langford concluded, "Interesting but patchy."

In Issue 36 of Abyss, Eric Olson found the characters "too black and white with few who can tread in a gray area." Olson also found "it is getting to be predictable that every major character on the side of truth and light is secretly and sometimes unknowingly a Deryni." Olson also felt this book "seems to wander a bit more than previous books. ... [It] is not as tight as the previous Kelson series, but it still has most of the positive qualities." Olson concluded, "Overall, I'd recommend it despite its flaws, because it is good storytelling."

In Issue 96 of Dragon Magazine, John C. Bunnell was torn, calling the book "well written, deviously plotted, and full of memorable characters. But unlike [Kurtz's] earlier novels, this new tale of the Deryni is also a disappointment ... [The protagonists] act far too much like RPG characters intent only on getting from point A to point B and on knocking aside any obstacles set in their path. Nearly all of the emotional stress in the novel is connected with relatively unimportant subplots." Bunnell concluded, "even with its flaws, the novel is still a good deal better than the average fantasy novel is. But even devoted Deryni fans may justifiably balk at paying the hardcover price for a book that could have been much better than this one is."

== Other reviews and commentary ==
- Fantasy Review, March 1985: Review by Diane K. Bauerle
- Science Fiction Chronicle, #92 (May 1987): Review by Don D'Ammassa
- The Work of Katherine Kurtz: An Annotated Bibliography & Guide, (1993): Review by Mary Wickizer Burgess and Robert Reginald [as by Mary A. Burgess and Boden Clarke]

== Awards and recognition ==
In 1985, The Bishop's Heir was ranked 26th in an annual poll of fantasy novels by Locus magazine readers, placing it between T. E. D. Klein's The Ceremonies and Lloyd Alexander's The Beggar Queen. The poll was won by Robert A. Heinlein for his novel, Job: A Comedy of Justice.

== Publication history ==
Katherine Kurtz wrote her first Deryni novel, Deryni Rising in 1970, and many more followed. The Bisshop's Heri was the seventh in the series, released in 1984.

=== Release details ===
- 1984, USA, Ballantine Books ISBN 0-345-31824-2, Hardcover (first edition)
- 1984, UK, Arrow Books ISBN 0-7126-0807-9, Pub date 22 November 1984, Hardcover
- 1984, UK, Trafalgar Square Books ISBN 0-7126-0935-0, Pub date 22 November 1984, Paperback
- 1985, USA, Del Rey Books ISBN 0-345-30097-1, Pub date 12 July 1985, Paperback
- 1986, UK, Legend Books ISBN 0-09-947800-5, Paperback
- 1987, USA, Ballantine Books. ISBN 9780345347619
