= Matt Stawicki =

American illustrator

- Born: Delaware, U.S.
- Education: American
- Alma mater: Pennsylvania College of Art and Design
- Known for: Illustrations

Cover of the Katherine Kurtz fantasy novel In the King's Service, showing the influence of Maxfield Parrish on the work of Matt Stawicki.

Matt Stawicki (born in Delaware) is an American professional illustrator best known for providing cover art for science fiction and fantasy novels.

== Career ==
His work has also been used for videogame covers, collectible card images, collectors plates and fantasy pocket knives. He claims the work of Maxfield Parrish, N.C. Wyeth, Norman Rockwell as his traditional influences. Working mainly in "digital paint" he is also influenced by the visual worlds created by Walt Disney, George Lucas and Steven Spielberg.

He studied at the Pennsylvania College of Art and Design in Lancaster, Pennsylvania, graduating in 1991. He began his professional career in 1992. He is noted for his work for the Dragonlance series.

Stawicki has illustrated cards for the Magic: The Gathering collectible card game.

His work is included in the book Masters of Dragonlance Art.
