= In the King's Service =

2003 novel by Katherine Kurtz

- Hardcover Edition
- Author: Katherine Kurtz
- Cover artist: Matt Stawicki
- Language: English
- Series: The Childe Morgan Trilogy
- Genre: Fantasy
- Publisher: Ace Books
- Publication date: 2003
- Publication place: United States
- Media type: Print (Paperback & Hardcover)
- Pages: 359 (first edition, hardcover)
- ISBN: 0-441-01060-1 (first edition, hardcover)
- OCLC: 52860126
- Dewey Decimal: 813/.54 22
- LC Class: PS3561.U69 I5 2003
- Preceded by: King Kelson's Bride (publication date), The Bastard Prince (literary chronology)
- Followed by: Childe Morgan

In the King's Service is a historical fantasy novel by American-born author Katherine Kurtz. It was first published by Ace Books in 2003. It was the fourteenth of Kurtz' Deryni novels to be published, and the first book in the fifth Deryni trilogy, the Childe Morgan trilogy. The events of this trilogy are a direct prequel to the first Deryni trilogy, the Chronicles of the Deryni.

== Plot introduction ==
The novel is set in the land of Gwynedd, one of the fictional Eleven Kingdoms. Gwynedd itself is a medieval kingdom similar to the British Isles of the 11th century, with a powerful Holy Church (based on the Roman Catholic Church), and a feudal government ruled by a hereditary monarchy. The population of Gwynedd includes both humans and Deryni, a race of people with inherent psychic and magical abilities who have persecuted and suppressed for almost two centuries. The novel begins one hundred and fifty-four years after the conclusion of The Bastard Prince and thirty-eight years before the beginning of Deryni Rising. The plot revolves around the court of King Donal Haldane, where several Deryni secretly work in service to the king. While Donal risks everything to secure a Deryni protector for his young son and heir, a new generation of Deryni, including Lady Alyce de Corwyn, struggles to find their place in the dangerous political and religious environment.

== Plot summary ==
The events of In the King's Service span a period of nine years, from 1082 to November 1091. The novel begins as members of the Camberian Council congratulate Lord Sief MacAthan on the birth of his son, Krispin. However, when Sief returns to Rhemuth later that night, he discovers that the child is actually the bastard son of King Donal Blaine Haldane, who fathered the child on Sief's wife, Lady Jessamy MacAthan, in an attempt to breed a Deryni protector for his sons and heirs. When Sief angrily attacks the king with his powers, Donal is forced to kill the Deryni lord with his own arcane abilities. The Camberian Council later investigates Sief's death, but they are unable to confirm their suspicions regarding the paternity of Jessamy's son.

In August of the following year, Jessamy welcomes Alyce and Marie de Corwyn, the daughters of Earl Keryell of Lendour to the royal court. Alyce and Marie spend several months in the service of Queen Richeldis before leaving Rhemuth to continue their education at Notre Dame d'Arc-en-Ciel, a royal convent where they meet Lady Zoë Morgan, the daughter of one of Donal's military aides, Sir Kenneth Morgan. Over the next several years, Alyce, Marie, and Zoë remain at the convent and pursue the common studies of ladies of noble birth.

In October 1086, rebellious Mearans attempt to assassinate Prince Richard Haldane, the king's younger half-brother. Although the plot is unsuccessful, Earl Keryell is slain and his eldest son and heir, Lord Ahern, is seriously wounded. Alyce and Marie return to Rhemuth to tend to their injured brother, and the three siblings escort their father's body back to Cynfyn shortly thereafter. While Ahern adjusts to his new role as Earl of Lendour, Lady Vera Howard reveals to the sisters that she is actually Alyce's twin sister. Alyce and Marie return to Rhemuth in February and soon secure a place for Vera in the royal household.

Torenthi raiders strike across the border into Corwyn in the summer of 1088, and Ahern, as hereditary Duke of Corwyn, travels to Coroth to deal with the situation. Donal joins Ahern several weeks later, and the young earl impresses the king with his natural leadership skills. Meanwhile, in Rhemuth, Marie is poisoned and killed by Lady Muriella, a lady-in-waiting to the queen who is jealous of Marie's developing relationship with Sir Sé Trelawney. Alyce escorts her sister's body to Coroth, and later returns to Rhemuth after the funeral.

Several months later, Ahern is summoned to court to advise the king on the increasingly tense situation in Meara. In April 1089, Ahern accompanies Donal when the king mounts a military campaign to put down a growing rebellion in Meara. Ahern further distinguishes himself during the campaign, but he becomes seriously ill while returning to Rhemuth in June. Kenneth rushes to fetch Alyce and Zoë, but Ahern soon dies, shortly after marrying Zoë.

With Ahern's death, Alyce is now the sole heiress to the Duchy of Corwyn. An assassination attempt on the king in November fails, but Kenneth is badly wounded in the attack. After Alyce nurses Kenneth back to health, Donal decides to marry the two and announces the betrothal in January 1090. The following day, tragedy strikes the castle when Krispin's dead body is discovered in a well. Donal commands Alyce to probe the dead boy's mind, and she succeeds in identifying the murderers, one of whom is a priest and the brother of a bishop. Although Donal executes the murderers, the fact that he does so without the consent of the Church results in excommunication for both the king and Alyce. Donal eventually resolves the rift, and Alyce and Kenneth are married in June.

Donal decides to once again attempt to father a Deryni protector for his sons, and convinces Jessamy to assist him after he chooses Alyce as his next target. Donal keeps Kenneth away from Rhemuth for much of the summer and autumn, but Jessamy's death in November creates an additional delay in the king's plan. Prior to her death, Jessamy reveals the details of the plan to Lord Seisyll Arilan, a member of Donal's council who is also a member of the Camberian Council. Donal finally attempts to bed Alyce in late January 1090, but Alyce stops him. Alyce and Kenneth inform the king that Alyce is already pregnant, and they pledge their son to the king's service, promising that their child will be raised to be the Deryni protector Donal has sought. In September, Alyce gives birth to her first child, Alaric Anthony Morgan. Several weeks later, Seisyll covertly confirms that the child is not Donal's.

== Characters ==
- King Donal Blaine Haldane: King of Gwynedd, husband of Queen Richeldis, father of Prince Brion
- Queen Richeldis MacFaolan-Gruffud: Queen of Gwynedd, second wife of King Donal Blaine, mother of Prince Brion
- Duke Richard Haldane: Prince of Gwynedd, Duke of Carthmoor, half-brother of King Donal Blaine
- Prince Brion Haldane: Prince of Gwynedd, eldest son and heir of King Donal Blaine
- Lady Jessamy MacAthan: wife of Lord Sief MacAthan, mother of Krispin MacAthan
- Lady Alyce de Corwyn: sister of Ahern and Marie de Corwyn
- Lady Marie de Corwyn: younger sister of Alyce and Ahern de Corwyn
- Lord Ahern de Corwyn: Hereditary Duke of Corwyn, brother of Alyce and Marie de Corwyn
- Lord Michon de Courcy: member of the Camberian Council
- Lord Seisyll Arilan: member of King Donal Blaine's council, member of the Camberian Council
- Sir Kenneth Morgan: aide to King Donal Blaine, father of Zoë Morgan
- Lady Zoë Morgan: eldest daughter of Sir Kenneth Morgan
- Lady Vera (de Corwyn) Howard: secret twin sister of Alyce de Corwyn
- Earl Jared McLain: Earl of Kierney
- Lord Krispin MacAthan: sole surviving son of Jessamy MacAthan

== Release details ==
- 2003, USA, Ace Books ISBN 0-441-01060-1, Pub date 4 November 2003, Hardcover (first edition)
- 2004, USA, Ace Books ISBN 0-441-01209-4, Pub date 28 December 2004, Paperback
