= Fantacollana =

Fantacollana was a series of fantasy books published in Italy by Editrice Nord. The first number, issued in May 1973, featured The Jewels of Aptor by Samuel R. Delany. The first issues, edited by Riccardo Valla, featured covers by artists such as Karel Thole, Michael Whelan and Frank Frazetta. Valla was replaced in the mid-1970s by Sandro Pergameno, who was followed by Alex Voglino.

Authors translated included US fantasy writers such as L. Sprague de Camp, Fritz Leiber, Robert E. Howard, Jack Vance, C. J. Cherryh, Marion Zimmer Bradley, David Gemmell, Harry Turtledove, Stephen R. Lawhead, and others. Original books from Italian authors were also published.

The series reduced substantially frequency of publication in the 2000s, including mostly short story collections edited by Marion Zimmer Bradley, and in 2006 and 2007 only two issues were published per year. The last issue was a translation of Marion Zimmer Bradley's Four Moons of Darkover, published in November 2008.

== List ==
1 - I gioielli di Aptor, Samuel Delany, 1973 (novel) ISBN 8842904430
2 - L'anello del tritone, L. Sprague De Camp, 1973 (novel) ISBN 8842904449
3 - Ali della notte, Robert Silverberg, 1973 (short story collection) ISBN 8842904457
4 - Lord Darcy, Randall Garrett, 1974 (short story collection) ISBN 8842904465
5 - Conan l'avventuriero, Robert E. Howard, 1974 (short story collection) ISBN 8842904473
6 - Jorian di Jiraz, L. Sprague De Camp, 1974 (novel) ISBN 8842904481
7 - Il pozzo della luna, Abraham Merritt, 1974 (short story collection) ISBN 884290449X
8 - Signore della luce, Roger Zelazny, 1975 (short story collection) ISBN 8842904503
9 - Kull di Valusia, Robert E. Howard, Lin Carter, 1975 (short story collection) ISBN 8842904511
10 - Paese d'ottobre, Ray Bradbury, 1975 (anthology) ISBN 884290452X
11 - Il castello d'acciaio, L. Sprague De Camp, Fletcher Pratt, 1975 (omnibus of novels) ISBN 8842904538
12 - Le spade di Lankhmar, Fritz Leiber, 1976 (novel) ISBN 8842904546
13 - Conan!, Robert E. Howard, Lin Carter, L. Sprague de Camp, 1976 (short story collection) ISBN 8842904554
14 - Alastor 2262, Jack Vance, 1976 (novel) ISBN 8842904562
15 - Il viaggio di Hiero, Sterling E. Lanier, 1976 (novel) ISBN 8842904570
16 - La stanza chiusa, Randall Garrett, 1977 (novel) ISBN 8842904589
17 - Zothique, Clark Ashton Smith, 1977 (anthology) ISBN 8842904597
18 - Davy, l'eretico, Edgar Pangborn, 1977 (novel) ISBN 8842904600
19 - Conan l'usurpatore, Robert E. Howard, 1977 (short story collection) ISBN 8842904619
20 - Il mondo di Nehwon, Fritz Leiber, 1977 (short story collection) ISBN 8842904627
21 - L'erede di Hastur, Marion Zimmer Bradley, 1978 (novel) ISBN 8842904635
22 - La porta di Ivrel, C. J. Cherryh, 1978 (novel) ISBN 8842904643
23 - Skull-Face, Robert E. Howard, 1978 (anthology) ISBN 8842904651
24 - Conan di Cimmeria, Robert E. Howard, Lin Carter, L. Sprague de Camp, 1978 (short story collection) ISBN 884290466X
25 - Elric di Melniboné, Michael Moorcock, 1978 (anthology) ISBN 8842904678
26 - Conan il Pirata, Robert E. Howard, 1979 (short story collection) ISBN 8842904694
27 - Il mago di Earthsea, Ursula K. Le Guin, 1979 (novel) ISBN 8842904686
28 - Spade tra i ghiacci, Fritz Leiber, 1979 (short story collection) ISBN 8842904708
29 - Tre cuori e tre leoni, Poul Anderson, 1979 (novel) ISBN 8842904716
30 - Elric il Negromante, Michael Moorcock, 1979 (short story collection) ISBN 8842904724
31 - Conan lo zingaro, Robert E. Howard, L. Sprague de Camp, Lin Carter, 1980 (short story collection) ISBN 8842904732
32 - Le tombe di Atuan, Ursula K. Le Guin, 1980 (novel) ISBN 8842904740
33 - Nostra Signora delle Tenebre, Fritz Leiber, 1980 (novel) ISBN 8842904759
34 - La torre proibita, Marion Zimmer Bradley, 1980 (novel) ISBN 8842904767
35 - Il drago e il George, Gordon R. Dickson, 1980 (novel) ISBN 8842904775
36 - Conan il guerriero, Robert E. Howard, L. Sprague de Camp, 1981 (short story collection) ISBN 8842904783
37 - La spiaggia più lontana, Ursula K. Le Guin, 1981 (novel) ISBN 8842904791
38 - La catena spezzata, Marion Zimmer Bradley, 1981 (novel) ISBN 8842904805
39 - Il pozzo di Shiuan, C. J. Cherryh, 1981 (novel) ISBN 8842904813
40 - L'era Hyboriana di Conan il Cimmero, Robert E. Howard, L. Sprague de Camp, Lin Carter, Björn Nyberg, 1981 (omnibus of novels) ISBN 8842904821
41 - Conan il bucaniere, L. Sprague De Camp, Lin Carter, 1982 (novel) ISBN 884290483X
42 - Jirel di Joiry, C. L. Moore, 1982 (short story collection) ISBN 8842904848
43 - Almuric. Il pianeta selvaggio, Robert E. Howard, 1982 (novel) ISBN 8842904856
44 - Northwest Smith il terrestre, C. L. Moore, 1982 (short story collection) ISBN 8842904864
45 - Il castello di Lord Valentine, Robert Silverberg, 1982 (novel) ISBN 8842904872
46 - Balthis l'avventuriera, Gianluigi Zuddas, 1983 (novel) ISBN 8842904880
47 - I figli del Tritone, Poul Anderson, 1983 (novel) ISBN 8842904899
48 - L'ombra del Torturatore, Gene Wolfe, 1983 (novel) ISBN 8842904902
49 - Cronache di Majipoor, Robert Silverberg, 1983 (short story collection) ISBN 8842904910
50 - L'esilio di Sharra, Marion Zimmer Bradley, 1983 (novel) ISBN 8842904929
51 - L'artiglio del conciliatore, Gene Wolfe, 1983 (novel) ISBN 8842904937
52 - Il mastino della guerra, Michael Moorcock, 1984 (novel) ISBN 8842904945
53 - La spada del Littore, Gene Wolfe, 1984 (novel) ISBN 8842904953
54 - Il ritorno di Hiero, Sterling E. Lanier, 1984 (novel) ISBN 8842904961
55 - La cittadella dell'Autarca, Gene Wolfe, 1984 (novel) ISBN 884290497X
56 - Il re non decapitato, L. Sprague De Camp, 1984 (novel) ISBN 8842904988
57 - Il Pontifex Valentine, Robert Silverberg, 1984 (novel) ISBN 8842904996
58 - Il volo dell'angelo, Gianluigi Zuddas, 1985 (novel) ISBN 8842905003
59 - Lyonesse, Jack Vance, 1985 (novel) ISBN 8842905011
60 - I fuochi di Azeroth, C. J. Cherryh, 1985 (novel) ISBN 884290502X
61 - Stregone suo malgrado, Christopher Stasheff, 1985 (novel) ISBN 8842905038
62 - Nel segno della Luna Bianca, Lino Aldani, Daniela Piegai, 1985 (novel) ISBN 8842905046
63 - Naufragio sul pianeta Darkover, Marion Zimmer Bradley, 1985 (novel) ISBN 8842905054
64 - La saga di Prydain, Lloyd Alexander, 1986 (omnibus of novels) ISBN 8842905062
65 - La grigia criniera del mattino, Joy Chant, 1986 (novel) ISBN 8842905070
66 - Il Re Pescatore, Tim Powers, 1986 (novel) ISBN 8842905089
67 - Il segno della profezia, David Eddings, 1986 (novel) ISBN 8842905097
68 - La perla verde, Jack Vance, 1986 (novel) ISBN 8842905100
69 - Il signore degli enigmi, Patricia A. Mc Killip, 1986 (omnibus of novels) ISBN 8842905119
70 - Damiano, Roberta Macavoy, 1987 (novel) ISBN 8842905127
71 - La spada incantata, Marion Zimmer Bradley, 1987 (novel) ISBN 8842905135
72 - La regina della magia, David Eddings, 1987 (novel) ISBN 8842905143
73 - Il principe rapito, Paul Edwin Zimmer, 1987 (novel) ISBN 8842905151
74 - Un mondo chiamato Camelot, Arthur H. Landis, 1987 (novel) ISBN 884290516X
75 - Il mago di Sua Maestà, Christopher Stasheff, 1987 (novel) ISBN 8842905178
76 - La valle di Aldur, David Eddings, 1987 (novel) ISBN 8842905186
77 - L'ascesa dei Deryni, Katherine Kurtz, 1988 (novel) ISBN 8842905194
78 - Un araldo per Valdemar, Mercedes Lackey, 1988 (novel) ISBN 8842905208
79 - Il castello incantato, David Eddings, 1988 (novel) ISBN 8842905216
80 - Il ritorno del principe, Paul Edwin Zimmer, 1988 (novel) ISBN 8842905224
81 - La congiura di Mandrigyn, Barbara Hambly, 1988 (novel) ISBN 8842905232
82 - La fine del gioco, David Eddings, 1988 (novel) ISBN 8842905240
83 - Le spade dei Drenai, David Gemmell, 1988 (novel) ISBN 8842905259
84 - La sfida dei Deryni, Katherine Kurtz, 1989 (novel) ISBN 8842905267
85 - La legione perduta, Harry Turtledove, 1989 (novel) ISBN 8842905275
86 - La leggenda dei Drenai, David Gemmell, 1989 (novel) ISBN 8842905283
87 - La principessa di Englene, Kathleen Sky, 1989 (novel) ISBN 8842905291
88 - Un imperatore per la legione, Harry Turtledove, 1989 (novel) ISBN 8842905305
89 - Il signore dei Deryni, Katherine Kurtz, 1989 (novel) ISBN 8842905313
90 - Taran di Prydain, Lloyd Alexander, 1989 (omnibus of novels) ISBN 8842905321
91 - La legione di Videssos, Harry Turtledove, 1990 (novel) ISBN 884290533X
92 - Il trono di Ark, Jonathan Wylie, 1990 (novel) ISBN 8842905348
93 - Le frecce di Valdemar, Mercedes Lackey, 1990 (novel) ISBN 8842905356
94 - Le daghe della Legione, Harry Turtledove, 1990 (novel) ISBN 8842905364
95 - Le montagne incantate, Ru Emerson, 1990 (novel) ISBN 8842905372
96 - Il cavaliere e il fante di spade, Fritz Leiber, 1990 (short story collection) ISBN 8842905380
97 - Un lupo nell'ombra, David Gemmell, 1990 (novel) ISBN 8842905399
98 - La lama dei druidi, Katharine Kerr, 1990 (novel) ISBN 8842905402
99 - Il ritorno del Re Drago, Stephen Lawhead, 1991 (novel) ISBN 8842905410
100 - Gli eredi di Ark, Jonathan Wylie, 1991 (novel) ISBN 8842905429
101 - Waylander, dei Drenai, David Gemmell, 1991 (novel) ISBN 8842905437
102 - Le caverne dell'esilio, Ru Emerson, 1991 (novel) ISBN 8842905445
103 - Lyonesse: Madouc, Jack Vance, 1991 (novel) ISBN 8842905453
104 - I Signori della Guerra di Nin, Stephen Lawhead, 1991 (novel) ISBN 8842905461
105 - L'ultimo dei guardiani, David Gemmell, 1991 (novel) ISBN 884290547X
106 - La strada per Underfall, Mike Jefferies, 1991 (novel) ISBN 8842905488
107 - Il destino di Valdemar, Mercedes Lackey, 1992 (novel) ISBN 8842905496
108 - L'ultimo eroe dei Drenai, David Gemmell, 1992 (novel) ISBN 884290550X
109 - Il mago di Ark, Jonathan Wylie, 1992 (novel) ISBN 8842905518
110 - La spada di fuoco, Stephen Lawhead, 1992 (novel) ISBN 8842905526
111 - L'incantesimo dei druidi, Katharine Kerr, 1992 (novel) ISBN 8842905534
112 - Sui mari del fato, Ru Emerson, 1992 (novel) ISBN 8842905542
113 - Il palazzo dei re, Mike Jefferies, 1992 (novel) ISBN 8842905550
114 - L'ascesa di Krispos, Harry Turtledove, 1992 (novel) ISBN 8842905569
115 - La magia di Wenshar, Barbara Hambly, 1993 (novel) ISBN 8842905577
116 - Il re dei fantasmi, David Gemmell, 1993 (novel) ISBN 8842905585
117 - Le nebbie di Elundium, Mike Jefferies, 1993 (novel) ISBN 8842905593
118 - Il Porto dei mondi incrociati, Michael Scott Rohan, 1993 (novel), ISBN 8842907049
119 - Il destino di Deverry, Katharine Kerr, 1993 (novel). ISBN 884290712X
120 - La chiamata degli eroi, Paul Edwin Zimmer, 1993 (novel). ISBN 8842907219
121 - L'ultima spada del potere, David Gemmell, 1993 (novel). ISBN 8842907286
122 - Krispos di Videssos, Harry Turtledove, 1993 (novel). ISBN 8842907391
123 - L'assedio di Vorsal, Barbara Hambly, 1994 (novel). ISBN 8842907499
124 - Il lupo dei Drenai, David Gemmell, 1994 (novel). ISBN 884290757X
125 - Il libro di Tezin-Dar, Angus Wells, 1994 (novel). ISBN 8842907626
126 - Verso la spirale dei mondi, Michael Scott Rohan, 1994 (novel). ISBN 8842907677
127 - Ritorno da Tezin-Dar, Angus Wells, 1994 (novel). ISBN 8842907731
128 - I cavalieri dei Gabala, David Gemmell, 1994 (novel). ISBN 8842907820
129 - Il drago di Deverry, Katharine Kerr, 1994 (novel). ISBN 8842907979
130 - L'impero degli incanti, Michael Scott Rohan, Allan Scott, 1995 (novel). ISBN 884290807X
131 - Il mago di Tezin-Dar, Angus Wells, 1995 (novel). ISBN 8842908150
132 - La leggenda di Druss, David Gemmell, 1995 (short story collection). ISBN 8842908266
133 - Il castello fra i mondi incrociati, Michael Scott Rohan, 1995 (novel). ISBN 8842908339
134 - Il potere del fuoco, Martha Wells, 1995 (novel). ISBN 8842908452
135 - Krispos l'imperatore, Harry Turtledove, 1995 (novel). ISBN 8842908517
136 - Il tempo dell'esilio, Katharine Kerr, 1995 (novel). ISBN 8842908630
137 - Il libro dei poteri, Harry Turtledove, 1996 (novel). ISBN 8842908770
138 - La spada delle Highland, David Gemmell, 1996 (novel). ISBN 8842908835
139 - I difensori di Cylith, Luca Pesaro, 1996 (novel). ISBN 8842908959
140 - I signori del cielo, Angus Wells, 1996 (novel). ISBN 8842909025
141 - Juti Manho la guerriera, Carol Severance, 1996 (novel). ISBN 8842909092
142 - Il cavaliere del Sole Nero, C. S. Friedman, 1996 (novel). ISBN 8842909297
143 - Il tempo dei presagi, Katharine Kerr, 1996 (novel). ISBN 8842909343
144 - Aurian, Maggie Furey, 1996 (novel). ISBN 8842909416
145 - Le pietre del potere, David Gemmell, 1997 (novel). ISBN 8842909459
146 - I giorni del sangue e del fuoco, Katharine Kerr, 1997 (novel). ISBN 8842909572
147 - L'Oceano del Sole Nero, C. S. Friedman, 1997 (novel). ISBN 8842909645
148 - La regina guerriera, David Gemmell, 1997 (novel). ISBN 8842909769
149 - La pietra di Moor, Morgan Fairy, 1997 (novel). ISBN 8842908371
150 - L'arciere di Kerry, Lynn Flewelling, 1997 (novel). ISBN 8842908584
151 - La corona nascosta, C. S. Friedman, 1997 (novel). ISBN 884290984X
152 - La regina delle Highland, David Gemmell, 1997 (novel). ISBN 8842909920
153 - Aurian: L'arpa dei venti, Maggie Furey, 1998 (novel). ISBN 884291004X
154 - Il tempo della giustizia, Katharine Kerr, 1998 (novel). ISBN 8842910139
155 - Alec di Kerry, Lynn Flewelling, 1998 (novel). ISBN 8842910228
156 - Amazon, Gianluigi Zuddas, 1998 (novel). ISBN 8842910287
157 - Aurian: La spada di fuoco, Maggie Furey, 1998 (novel). ISBN 8842910376
158 - La spada delle rune, Ann Marston, 1998 (novel). ISBN 8842910538
159 - Aurian: Dhiammara, Maggie Furey, 1999 (novel). ISBN 8842910430
160 - Le maschere del potere, Errico Passaro, 1999 (novel). ISBN 8842910805
161 - Il re d'occidente, Ann Marston, 1999 (novel). ISBN 8842910864
162 - Stella di Gondwana, Gianluigi Zuddas, 1999 (novel). ISBN 8842910961
163 - La lama infranta, Ann Marston, 1999 (novel). ISBN 884291102X
164 - Il traditore di Kerry, Lynn Flewelling, 1999 (novel). ISBN 8842911062
165 - Il principe di Skai, Ann Marston, 1999 (novel). ISBN 8842911143
166 - Le amazzoni del sud, Gianluigi Zuddas, 2000 (novel). ISBN 8842911232
167 - Il cuore di Myrial, Maggie Furey, 2000 (novel). ISBN 8842911313
168 - Il re delle ombre, Ann Marston, 2000 (novel). ISBN 8842911402
169 - Il libro dell'Impero, Adalberto Cersosimo, 2000 (short story collection). ISBN 8842911488
170 - Il figlio delle tempeste, Fabiana Redivo, 2000 (novel). ISBN 8842911542
171 - La spada in esilio, Ann Marston, 2000 (novel). ISBN 8842911607
172 - La pietra degli elementi, Fabiana Redivo, 2001 (novel). ISBN 8842911712
173 - Il segno dei ribelli, Rossella Romano, 2001 (novel). ISBN 8842911771
174 - La trappola d'oro, James Oliver Curwood, 2001 (novel). ISBN 8842911771
175 - Gli eredi della luce, Mariangela Cerrino, 2001 (short story collection). ISBN 8842911933
176 - Il seme perduto, Fabiana Redivo, 2001 (novel). ISBN 8842911941
177 - Il sigillo nero, Morgan Fairy, 2002 (novel). ISBN 884291200X
178 - Le sette gemme, Andrea D'Angelo, 2002 (novel). ISBN 8842912026
179 - Solomon Kane il giustiziere, Robert E. Howard, Gianluigi Zuddas, 2002 (short story collection). ISBN 8842912093
180 - Il respiro delle montagne, Ornella Lepre, 2002 (novel). ISBN 8842912158
181 - L'arcimago Lork, Andrea D'Angelo, 2002 (novel). ISBN 8842912255
182 - Il figlio del vento, Fabiana Redivo, 2002 (novel). ISBN 884291231X
183 - Il settimo figlio, Orson Scott Card, 2002 (novel). ISBN 8842912344
184 - Il profeta dalla pelle rossa, Orson Scott Card, 2002 (novel). ISBN 8842912352
185 - Alvin l'apprendista, Orson Scott Card, 2002 (novel). ISBN 8842912360
186 - La loggia della lince, Katherine Kurtz, Deborah Turner Harris, 2003 (novel). ISBN 8842912395
187 - Le luci di Avardale, Mary Corran, 2003 (novel). ISBN 8842912425
188 - Lo spirito della pietra, Maggie Furey, 2003 (novel). ISBN 8842912387
189 - La fortezza, Andrea D'Angelo, 2003 (novel). ISBN 884291245X
190 - Le spade incantate, Marion Zimmer Bradley (editor), 2003 (anthology). ISBN 8842912670
191 - Le nebbie di Afra, Fabiana Redivo, 2003 (novel). ISBN 8842912700
192 - Il cerchio dei dodici, Katherine Kurtz, Deborah Turner Harris, 2003 (novel). ISBN 8842912719
193 - Le tre candele, Marion Zimmer Bradley, Elisabeth Waters, 2003 (novel breve) - ISBN 8842912824
194 - L'occhio dell'eternità, Maggie Furey, 2004 (novel). ISBN 884291312X
195 - La giustizia delle spade, Marion Zimmer Bradley (editor), 2004 (anthology). ISBN 8842913111
196 - La spada dei re, Fabiana Redivo, 2004 (novel). ISBN 8842913200
197 - Il sigillo infranto, Katherine Kurtz, Deborah Turner Harris, 2004 (novel). ISBN 8842913359
198 - Le libere amazzoni di Darkover, Marion Zimmer Bradley (editor), 2004 (anthology). ISBN 8842913278
199 - La città di luce e d'ombra, Patricia A. Mc Killip, 2005 (novel). ISBN 8842913677
200 - La rocca dei silenzi, Andrea D'Angelo, 2005 (novel). ISBN 884291357X
201 - Streghe Guerriere, Marion Zimmer Bradley (editor), 2005 (anthology). ISBN 8842913634
202 - Le nevi di Darkover, Marion Zimmer Bradley (editor), 2005 (anthology). ISBN 8842914010
203 - Con il cuore e con la spada, Marion Zimmer Bradley (editor), 2006 (anthology). ISBN 8842914371
204 - Le torri di Darkover, Marion Zimmer Bradley (editor), 2006 (anthology). ISBN 8842914371
205 - La luce della spada, Marion Zimmer Bradley (editor), 2007 (anthology). ISBN 8842915033
206 - Le donne di Darkover, Marion Zimmer Bradley (editor), 2007 (anthology). ISBN 8842915300
207 - Nel segno del coraggio, Marion Zimmer Bradley (editor), Rachel E. Holmen (editor), 2008 (anthology). ISBN 8842915041
208 - La quattro lune di Darkover, Marion Zimmer Bradley (editor), 2008 (anthology). ISBN 8842915483

== Notes ==
- Publication Series: Fantacollana at Internet Speculative Fiction Database
- Fantacollana at fantascienza.com
