= Callanish X =

Archaeological site in Outer Hebrides, Scotland

- Druim Nan Eun
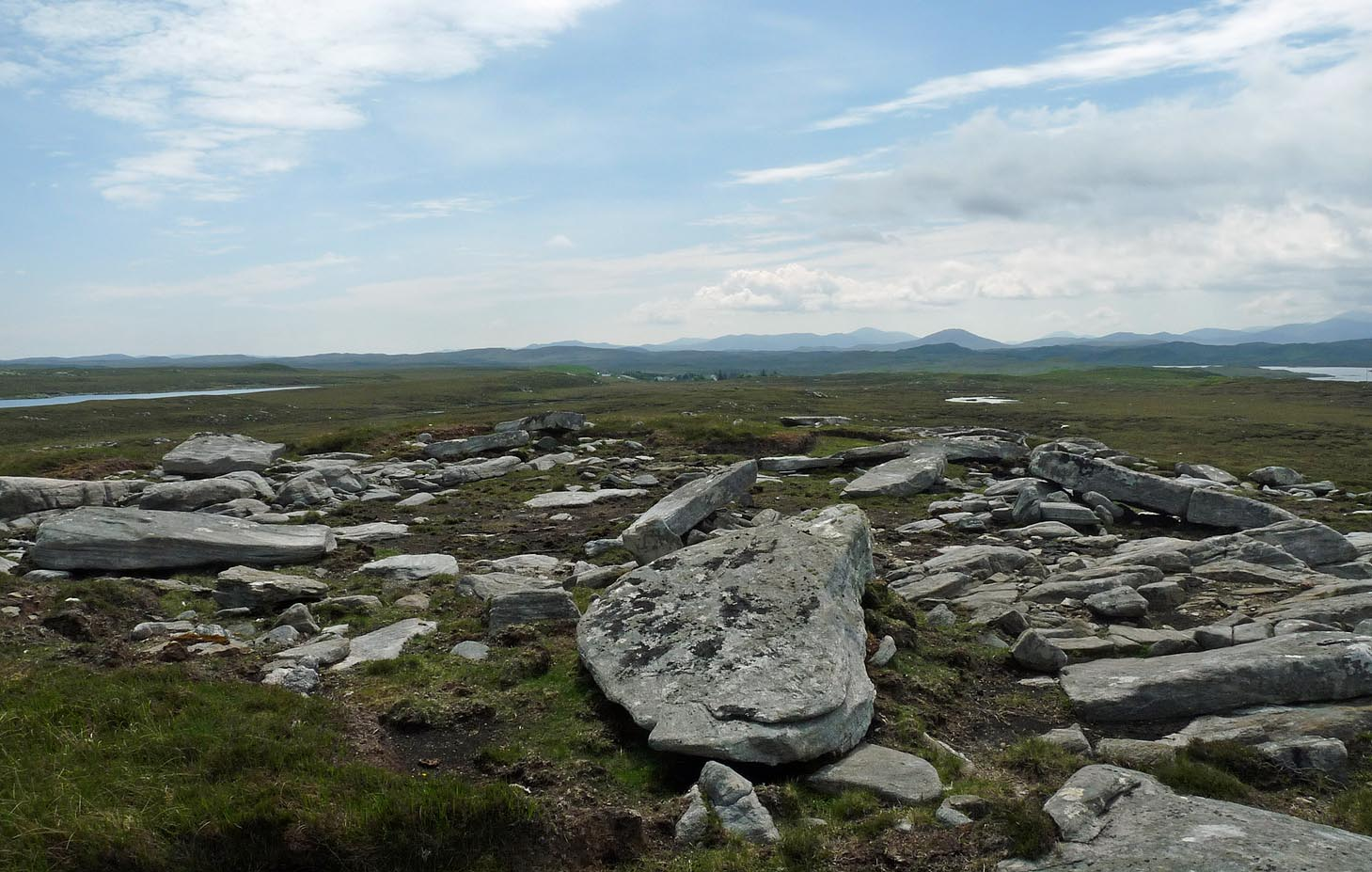
- The collapsed stones in 2016

- Location on Lewis
- 58.203860°N 6.716981°W
- Type: Standing stones
- Periods: Neolithic, Bronze Age
- Location: Lewis, Scotland, United Kingdom

History
- Built: c. 2750 BC

Site notes
- Material: Stone

Callanish X (also known as "Na Dromannan" and "Druim Nan Eun") is the collapsed remains of a stone circle. It is one of many megalithic structures around the more well-known and larger Calanais I on the west coast of the isle of Lewis, in the Western Isles of the Outer Hebrides, Scotland. The fallen stones lie on the summit of the rocky ridge, Druim nan Eun.

== Description ==
The stones were examined from 2003–2006 in an excavation involving the removal of the covering layer of peat. These excavations revealed that the circle had comprised a ring of 17 stones, of which two are missing and the remaining 15 have fallen over. Within the central area are another five fallen stones which formed an inner circle.

There is also an outlying stone which stood to the north and two stones which stood to the south. The two southern stones, together with two naturally-positioned erratic stones, appear to have formed a short entranceway, or avenue, leading upslope from the south.

The stones at Callanish X had been erected on bare rock, where it was impossible to dig pits or sockets in the tough bedrock. Hence the stones had been held in place by jamming smaller stones around their bases. This was inadequate to hold them long term, and most of the monoliths had fallen after "several hundred years".

== Construction and dating ==
Callanish X was probably built during the Neolithic period, between about 3000 and 2500 BC, when communities across the Isle of Lewis were raising stone monuments across the moor. The site itself has not been excavated or directly dated, but archaeologists place it within this period because it closely resembles other stone settings in the Callanish group.

Excavations at the nearby Callanish I stone circle have shown that the landscape was already a place of ritual activity before the stones were erected. Archaeologists uncovered traces of an earlier timber structure along with pottery from Neolithic communities. Radiocarbon dating suggests that the famous stone circle was built later in the Neolithic period, replacing or building on these earlier wooden monuments. Smaller settings scattered across the surrounding hills, including Callanish X, are generally thought to belong to this same phase of monument building.

The stones themselves are made from Lewisian gneiss, a hard metamorphic rock that forms the ancient bedrock of the Isle of Lewis. Outcrops of the same rock still break through the peat across the landscape today. Neolithic builders probably selected suitable slabs nearby and hauled them short distances across the moor before raising them upright.

Setting the stones required planning, teamwork, and patience. Workers first dug a pit for each stone, then used wooden levers, ropes, and earthen ramps to lift the heavy slabs into place. Smaller packing stones were wedged around the base to keep them steady.

Although modest in scale, Callanish X formed part of a much larger episode of monument building on Lewis. Across the ridges and valleys above Loch Roag, communities raised circles, alignments, and stone settings that reshaped the landscape. What visitors see today is the surviving outline of that effort: stones planted firmly in the ground, marking a landscape that Neolithic people had turned into a place of gathering, movement, and ceremony.

== Callanish monuments ==
Callanish X is one of several groups of standing stones scattered across the moorland of western Lewis in the Outer Hebrides. Archaeologists often describe these sites together as the Callanish monuments. Instead of a single stone circle standing alone, the landscape around Loch Roag contains a small network of prehistoric sites built during the Neolithic.

The best known of these monuments is the nearby Callanish stone circle, often called Callanish I. Other sites lie within a few kilometres of it, including Callanish II, Callanish III, Callanish IV, and Callanish VIII. Each is slightly different. Some form small circles of stones, while others appear as short lines or oval groups set into the ground.

Most of the monuments stand on low ridges or gentle slopes above Loch Roag and the surrounding sea inlets. From these places there are wide views across the open moor and toward the coast. The stones often stand on slight rises where they are easy to see against the sky. In some cases it is possible that people moving across the landscape could see one group of stones from another.

Taken together, these sites suggest that the stones were never meant to stand alone. Instead they formed part of a wider ceremonial landscape used by the communities who lived along the western coast of Lewis thousands of years ago.
