= Callanish =

Village on the Isle of Lewis, Scotland

Coordinates: 58.201°N 6.745°W

Callanish: Scottish Gaelic: Calanais
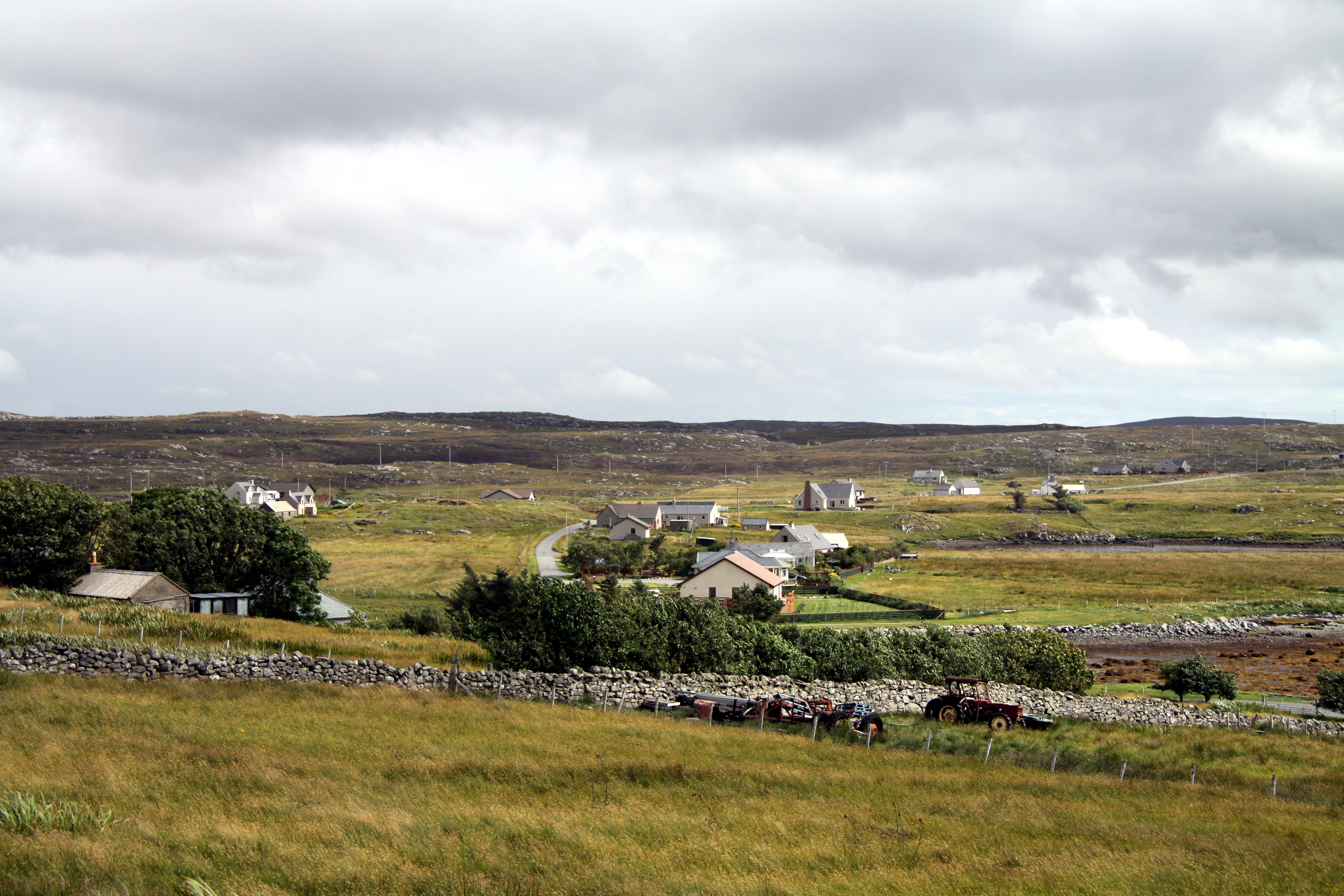
- A view to Callanish village from the Callanish Stones in summer 2012

- Location within the Outer Hebrides
- Language: Scottish Gaelic; English
- OS grid reference: NB212333
- Civil parish: Uig
- Council area: Na h-Eileanan Siar
- Lieutenancy area: Western Isles
- Country: Scotland
- Sovereign state: United Kingdom
- Post town: ISLE OF LEWIS
- Postcode district: HS2
- Dialling code: 01851
- Police: Scotland
- Fire: Scottish
- Ambulance: Scottish
- UK Parliament: Na h-Eileanan an Iar
- Scottish Parliament: Na h-Eileanan an Iar

Calanais (English: Callanish) is a village (township) on the west side of the Isle of Lewis, in the Outer Hebrides (Western Isles), Scotland. Calanais is within the parish of Uig. A linear settlement with a jetty, it is on a headland jutting into Loch Roag, a sea loch 13 miles (21 kilometres) west of Stornoway. Calanais is situated alongside the A858, between Breasclete and Garynahine.

The Calanais Stones "Calanais I", a cross-shaped setting of standing stones erected around 3000 BC, are one of the most spectacular megalithic monuments in Scotland. A modern visitor centre provides information about the main circle and other lesser monuments nearby, numbered as Calanais II to X.

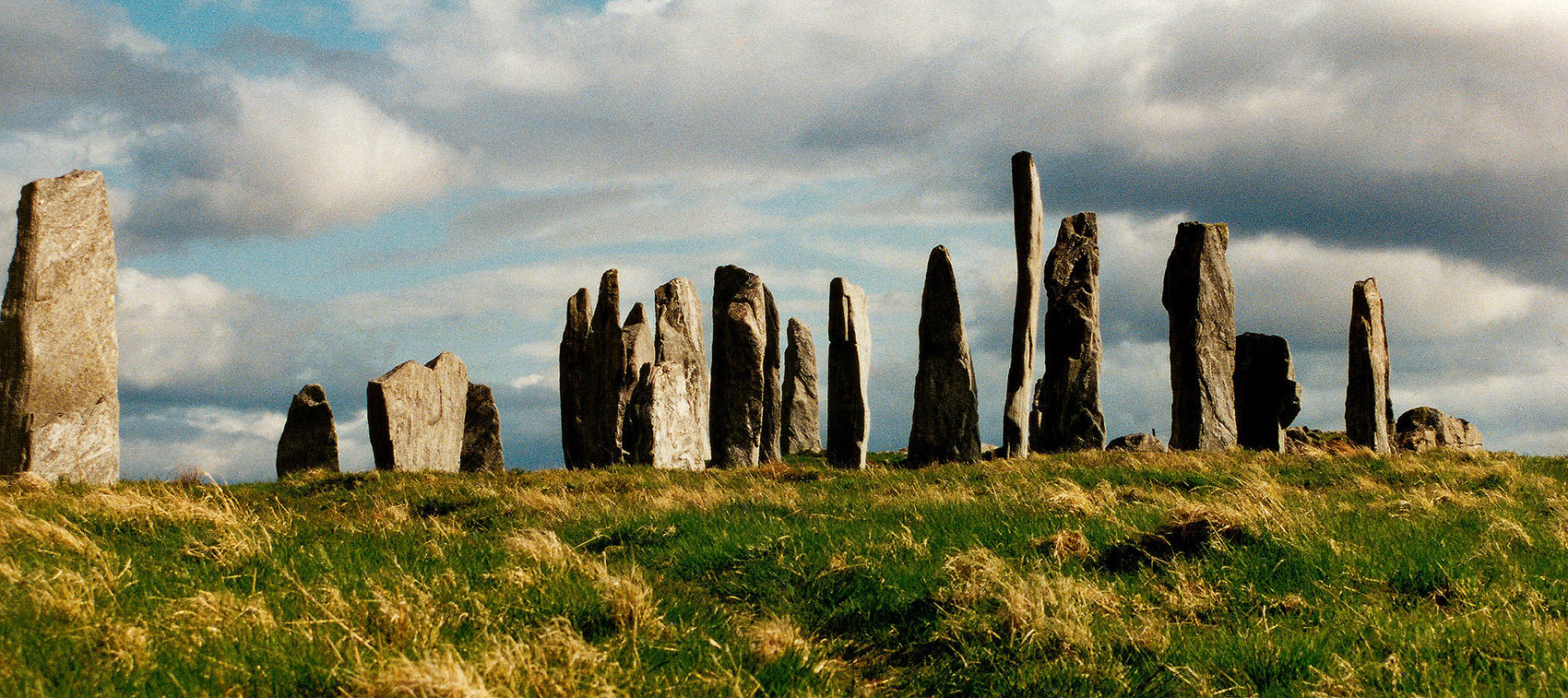
Callanish Standing Stones, Outer Hebrides
