= Callanish Stones =

Neolithic standing stones in the Scottish Outer Hebrides

Calanais Stones
- Clachan Chalanais
- Calanais I
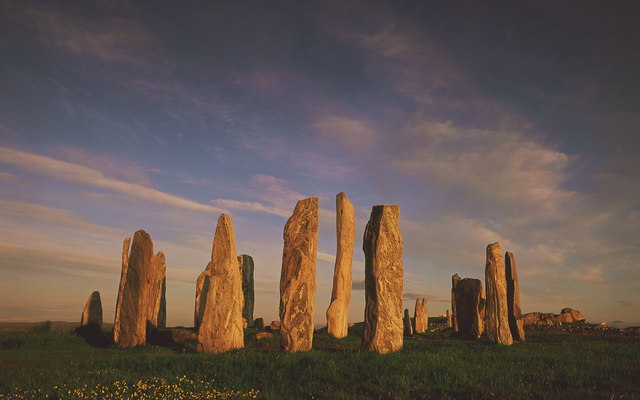
- The stone circle at the centre of the Calanais Stones

- Location on Lewis Location in Scotland
- 58°11′51″N 6°44′43″W
- Type: Stone circle and rows
- Periods: Neolithic, Bronze Age
- Location: Isle of Lewis, Scotland

History
- Built: c. 2750 BC

Site notes
- Material: Stone

The Calanais Stones (also known as Calanais I; Scottish Gaelic: Clachan Chalanais or Tursachan Chalanais) are a prehistoric stone circle and stone alignment on the west coast of the Isle of Lewis in the Outer Hebrides of Scotland. The monument was built during the Neolithic period, around c. 2750 BC.

The stones form a circle with a tall central monolith and several rows of standing stones extending outward in different directions, creating a distinctive cross-shaped layout. The monument stands on a low ridge overlooking Loch Roag, near the village of Calanais.

The Calanais Stones are the central site within a wider landscape of prehistoric monuments on Lewis. Several other stone circles and settings lie nearby, including Callanish II, Callanish III, Callanish IV, and Callanish VIII, forming what archaeologists often describe as the Calanais complex.

Archaeological evidence shows that the site was used for ceremonial activity for many centuries during the Neolithic and Bronze Age. Today, the stones are among the most important prehistoric monuments in Britain and are protected as a scheduled monument in the care of Historic Environment Scotland.

== Name and etymology ==
The monument is widely known in English as the Callanish Stones (or Calanais Stones), the anglicised form of the local place name Calanais, a settlement on the west coast of the Isle of Lewis in the Outer Hebrides of Scotland.

In Scottish Gaelic the monument is known as Clachan Chalanais or, more specifically, Tursachan Chalanais.

- Clachan means "stones" or "a group of stones".
- Tursa (singular), Tursachan (plural), is the Gaelic term for "standing stones" (menhir or monolith). Thus Tursachan Chalanais translates as "the standing stones of Calanais" or "the stone setting of Calanais".

The word tursa (plural tursachan) is the standard Gaelic term used across Scotland for prehistoric standing stones and stone circles. The local visitor centre trust is accordingly named Urras nan Tursachan (The Standing Stones Trust).

Archaeologists often refer to the main monument as Calanais I (or Callanish I). This numbering system distinguishes it from the many other prehistoric stone settings in the surrounding landscape, including Callanish II, Callanish III, Callanish IV, and several smaller sites, collectively known as the Calanais complex.

These different names reflect the long history of the site. The Gaelic names derive from longstanding local place-name traditions connected to the landscape, while the numbered designation is a modern archaeological convention for studying the wider monument complex.

== Location ==
The Calanais Stones (grid reference NB213330) are situated on a low ridge above the waters of Loch Roag with the hills of Great Bernera as a backdrop.

Numerous other ritual sites lie within a few kilometres (miles). These include at least three other circles, several arcs, alignments and single stones; many visible from the main site. The most impressive – Callanish II and Callanish III – lie just over a kilometre (1000 yards) southeast of the main Calanais Stones, and originally consisted of circles of stones at least eight in number. The existence of other monuments in the area implies that Calanais was an active focus for prehistoric religious activity for at least 1,500 years. (see Callanish III, Callanish IV, Callanish VIII and Callanish X). Historic Environment Scotland states that the stones were erected around 2750 BC, pre-dating Stonehenge.

== Description ==
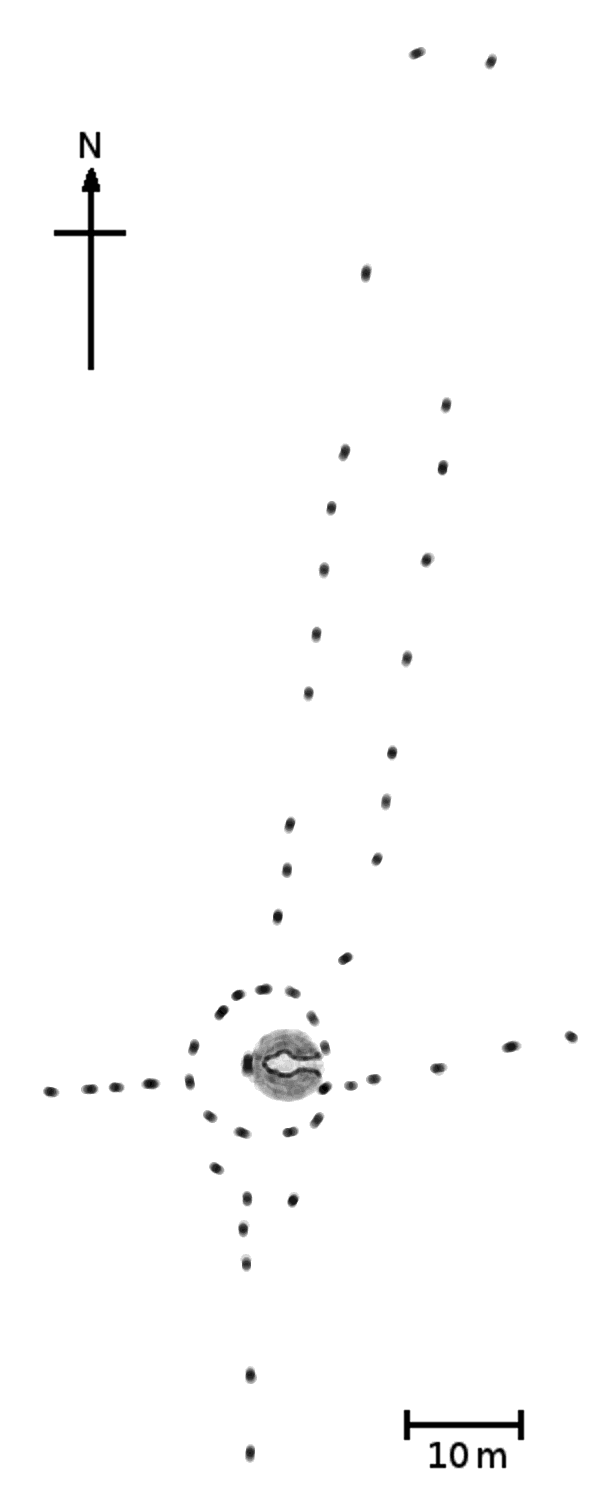
Map of the Callanish Stones

The Calanais Stones consist of a stone circle of thirteen stones with a monolith near the middle. Five rows of standing stones connect to this circle. Two long rows of stones running almost parallel to each other from the stone circle to the north-northeast form a kind of avenue. In addition, there are shorter rows of stones to the west-southwest, south and east-northeast. The stones are all of the same rock type, namely the local Lewisian gneiss. Within the stone circle is a chambered tomb to the east of the central stone.

=== Centre stone ===
The central monolith stands 0.8 metres (32 inches) west of the true centre of the stone circle. The stone is 4.8 metres (16 feet) high, 1.5 metres (5 feet) wide and 0.3 metres (1 foot) thick. The largest sides of the stone are almost perfectly oriented to the north and south. The monolith has the shape of a ship's rudder and probably weighs about seven tonnes.

=== Stone circle ===
The stone circle consists of thirteen stones and has a diameter of 11.4 metres (37 feet). The stone circle is not a perfect circle, but is a ring with a flattened east side (13.4 metres; 44 feet north–south by 12 metres; 40 feet east–west). The stones have an average height of three metres (10 feet). The ring covers an area of 124 square metres (148 sq. yd.). This is quite small compared to similar circles, including the nearby Callanish II which is 2.5 times as large.

=== Northern avenue ===
The avenue connects to the stone circle from the north-northeast. The avenue is 83.2 metres (90 yards) long. The avenue has 19 stones remaining: nine stones are on the eastern side, ten on the western side. The largest stone is 3.5 metres (12 feet) high and stands on the western end of the row. The two rows are not exactly parallel to each other but fan out: at the north end the rows are 6.7 metres (22 feet) apart, while the distance between the rows is 6 metres (20 feet) at the south end. From the circle the height of the stones decreases towards the middle of the avenue; from there the height increases again. The stones of the eastern side of the avenue have only three-quarters of the height of the stones on the western side.

=== Stone rows ===
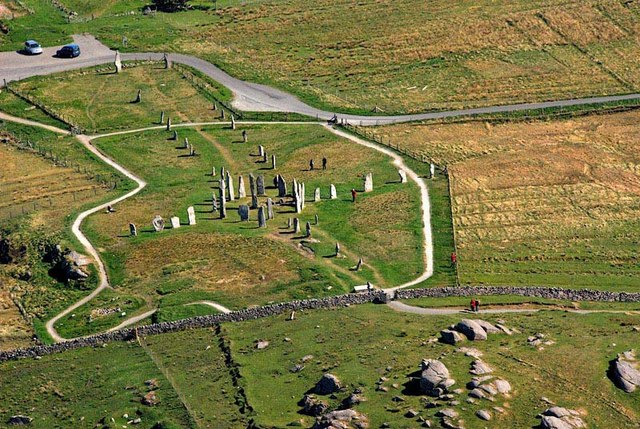
Callanish stones seen from above

As well as the two stone rows of the avenue, there are three stone rows connecting to the circle. One comes from the east-northeast, one from the south, and one from the west-southwest. The east-northeast row today consists of five stones and is 23.2 metres (76 feet) long. The southern row consists of five stones and is 27.2 metres (90 feet) long. The west-southwest row consists of four stones and is 13 metres (43 feet) long.

None of the stone rows is aimed at the centre of the stone circle. The east-northeast row is aligned to a point 2 metres (6 feet) south of the centre; the south row points to 1 metre (3 feet) west of the centre and the west-southwest row points to 1 metre (3 feet) south of the centre.

=== Chambered tomb ===
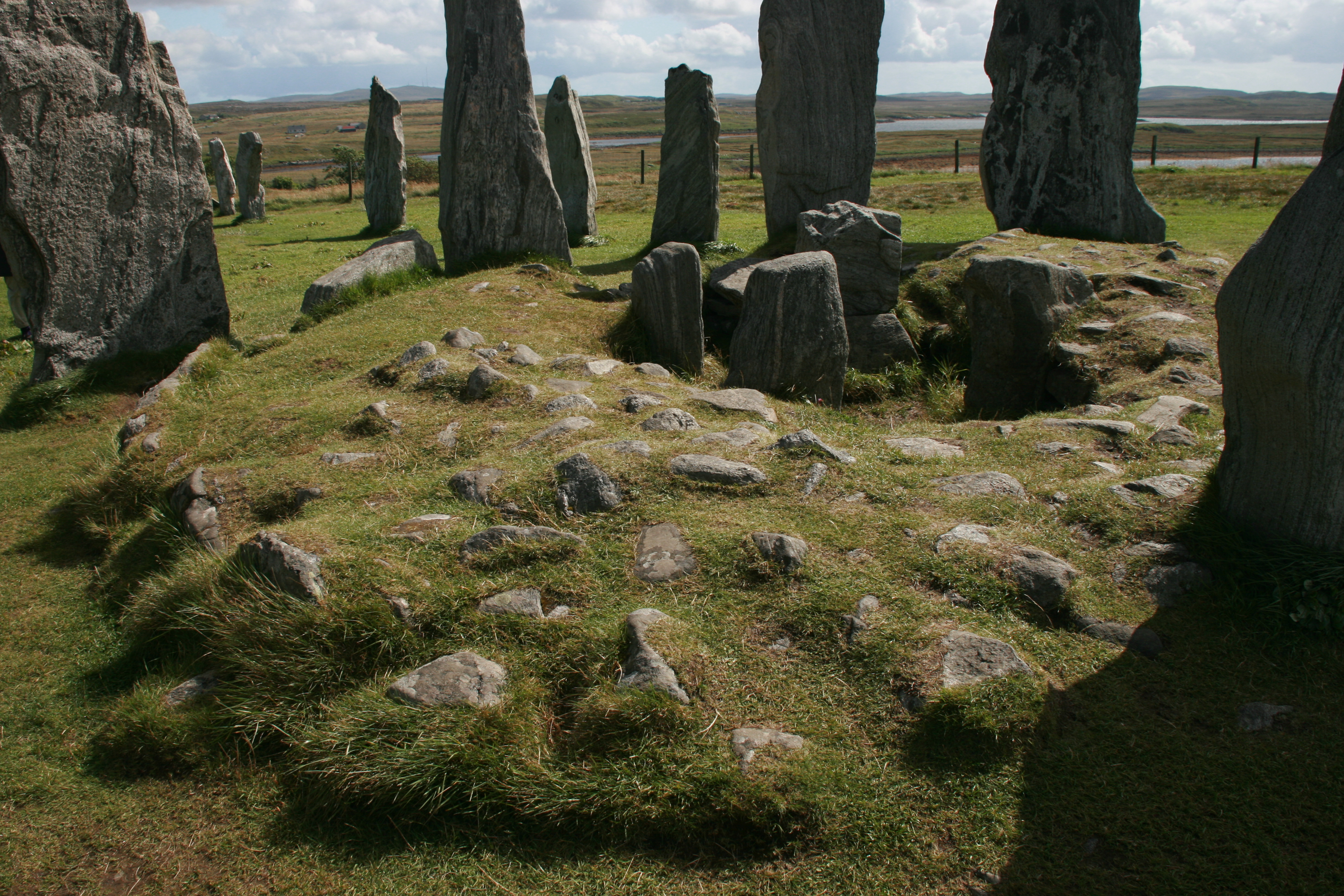
Chambered tomb

Between the central and the eastern monolith of the stone circle is a chambered tomb 6.4 metres (21 feet) long. This was built later than the stone circle and is squashed in between the eastern stones and the central monolith.

There is another stone cairn just on the northeast side of the stone circle. It has been reduced to ground-level and the outline can barely be traced. It is not necessarily an original part of the site.

== Archaeology and dating ==
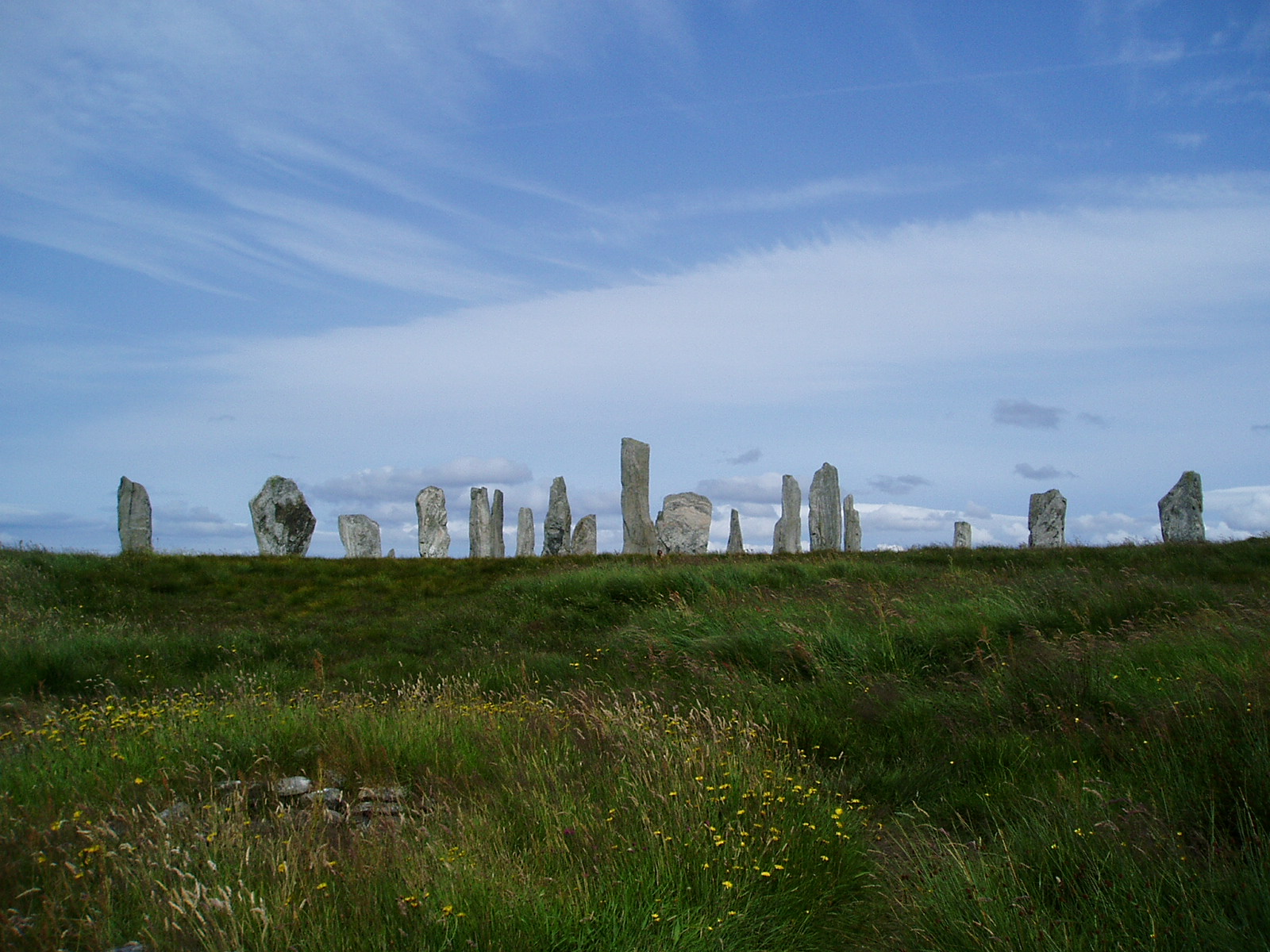
A distant view of the circle, stone rows and part of the northern avenue

There were limited excavations from 1980 to 1981 which provided some information on the development of the site. The first traces of human activity are indicated by a broad ditch (no longer visible above ground) which appears to have belonged to some structure or enclosure. This may have been ritual, but could instead have been domestic. In the centuries around 3000 BC, however, the site was turned over to agriculture, which obliterated most of the earlier traces. After this, the site was allowed to grass over for a time.

The stone circle was set up between 2900 and 2600 BC. It is not clear whether the stone alignments were constructed at the same time as the circle, or later. Some time after the erection of the stones, a small chambered tomb was inserted into the eastern part of the stone circle. The many pottery fragments found indicate that the tomb was used for several centuries. These pottery fragments included not only the local Hebridean pots, but numerous sherds of beaker vessels (dating to around 2000–1700 BC) and sherds of grooved ware.

Around 1500–1000 BC the complex fell out of use and was despoiled by the later Bronze Age farmers. Fragments of pots appear to have been cast out of the chamber. This may have been just ordinary agriculture, but it may conceivably have been ritual cleansing. There appears to have been a later rebuilding of the tomb, but this may have been for domestic use as there is no evidence for any later ritual use of the monument. Excavations in 1999–2000, to the south of the stones, found fragments of a prehistoric field system buried beneath blanket peat, as well as stone structures, including buildings, walls, clearance cairns and cobbled surfaces. The analyses found that these features were the result of prehistoric farming activity from the Late Bronze Age/Early Iron Age indicating the whole area was used for farming at that time. Between 1000 BC and 500 BC the stones were covered by a thick layer of turf. It is estimated that the place was abandoned around 800 BC. Only in 1857 was the overlying 1.5 metres (5 feet) of peat removed.

== Later history ==
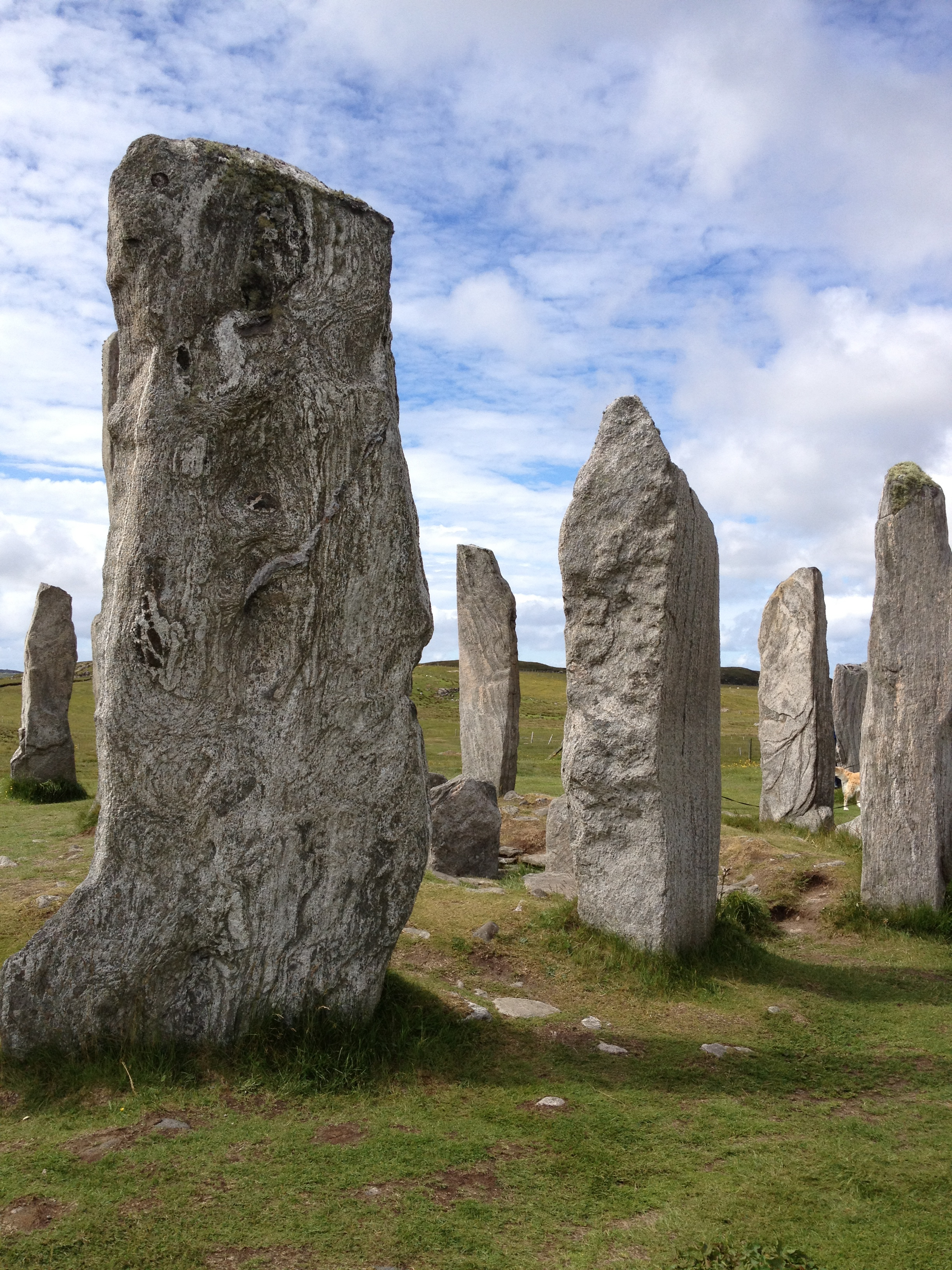
Callanish Stones

The first written reference to the stones was by Lewis native John Morisone, who around 1680 wrote that the stones were men "converted into stone by ane Inchanter" and set up in a ring "for devotione". Sometime around 1695 Martin Martin visited the site and was told by the local people that "it was a place appointed for worship in the time of heathenism, and that the chief druid or priest stood near the big stone in the centre, from whence he addressed himself to the people that surrounded him." In his 1726 work on the druids, John Toland specifically identified Diodorus Siculus' Hyperborea with Lewis, and the "spherical temple" mentioned by Diodorus with the Calanais Stones. In 1743, William Stukeley described the stone circle as a druid circle and the avenue like a serpent. In 1819, geologist John MacCulloch published the first accurate description. In 1846, the Danish historian J. J. A. Worsaae made a sketch and plan of the Calanais Stones.

In 1857 peat to a depth of five feet (1.5 metres) was cleared away, under the orders of the proprietor of Lewis, James Matheson, revealing the chambered tomb and the true height of the stones. In 1885 the Calanais Stones were taken into state care.

== Interpretation ==
Alexander Thom and Gerald Hawkins suggested that the stones were a prehistoric lunar observatory. Others have proposed a relationship between the stones, the moon and the Clisham range in Harris. Critics of these theories argue that several alignments are likely to exist purely by chance in any such structure, and many factors such as the weathering and displacement of the stones over the millennia mean there can be no certainty of any alignments, original or otherwise.

== Conservation and heritage status ==
The Callanish Stones are a protected archaeological site in the care of Historic Environment Scotland. The monument is legally protected as a scheduled monument under the Ancient Monuments and Archaeological Areas Act 1979, recognising its national importance as one of the most significant prehistoric stone settings in Britain.

Historic Environment Scotland is responsible for managing and conserving the site. This includes maintaining the stones and the surrounding archaeological landscape, monitoring their condition, and managing public access so visitors can experience the monument without damaging it.

Visitors can learn more about the site at the nearby Calanais Stones Visitor Centre. The centre is operated by Urras Nan Tursachan (The Standing Stones Trust), a local charitable organisation that provides exhibitions, educational information, and facilities for people exploring the wider Callanish stone complex.

== In folklore ==
According to one tradition, the Calanais Stones were petrified giants who would not convert to Christianity. In the 17th century the people of Lewis were calling the stones fir bhrèige ("false men"). Another legend is that early on midsummer morning an entity known as the "Shining One" walks the length of the avenue, his coming heralded by the call of the cuckoo.

== In popular culture ==
=== Literature ===
- The stones appear as a setting in the novel Lookout Cartridge (1974) by American writer Joseph McElroy, where they form part of the book's Scottish landscape.
- The stones feature in Death of an Adept (1996), a fantasy novel by Katherine Kurtz and Deborah Turner Harris. They also appear on the cover of the 1997 mass market paperback edition illustrated by Joe Burleson.

=== Music and album artwork ===
- The band Ultravox used an image of the stones on the cover of their album Lament (1984). Parts of the promotional video for the single "One Small Day" were filmed at the site, although the performance scenes were shot at the nearby Calanais III.
- Musician Jon Mark released the album The Standing Stones of Callanish (1988), an ambient recording inspired by Britain's ancient landscapes.
- The stones appear on the cover of Jehovahkill (1992), an album by Julian Cope reflecting his interest in prehistoric monuments and megalithic culture.
- The album Dream Harder (1993) by The Waterboys includes the song "Wonders of Lewis", which appears to reference the stones and the wider prehistoric landscape of the Isle of Lewis.
- The Dutch melodic death metal band Callenish Circle took their name from the monument, using a slightly altered spelling of Callanish.
- The British electronic band Ladytron filmed the music video for the song "Mirage", from their album Gravity the Seducer (2011), at the stones.

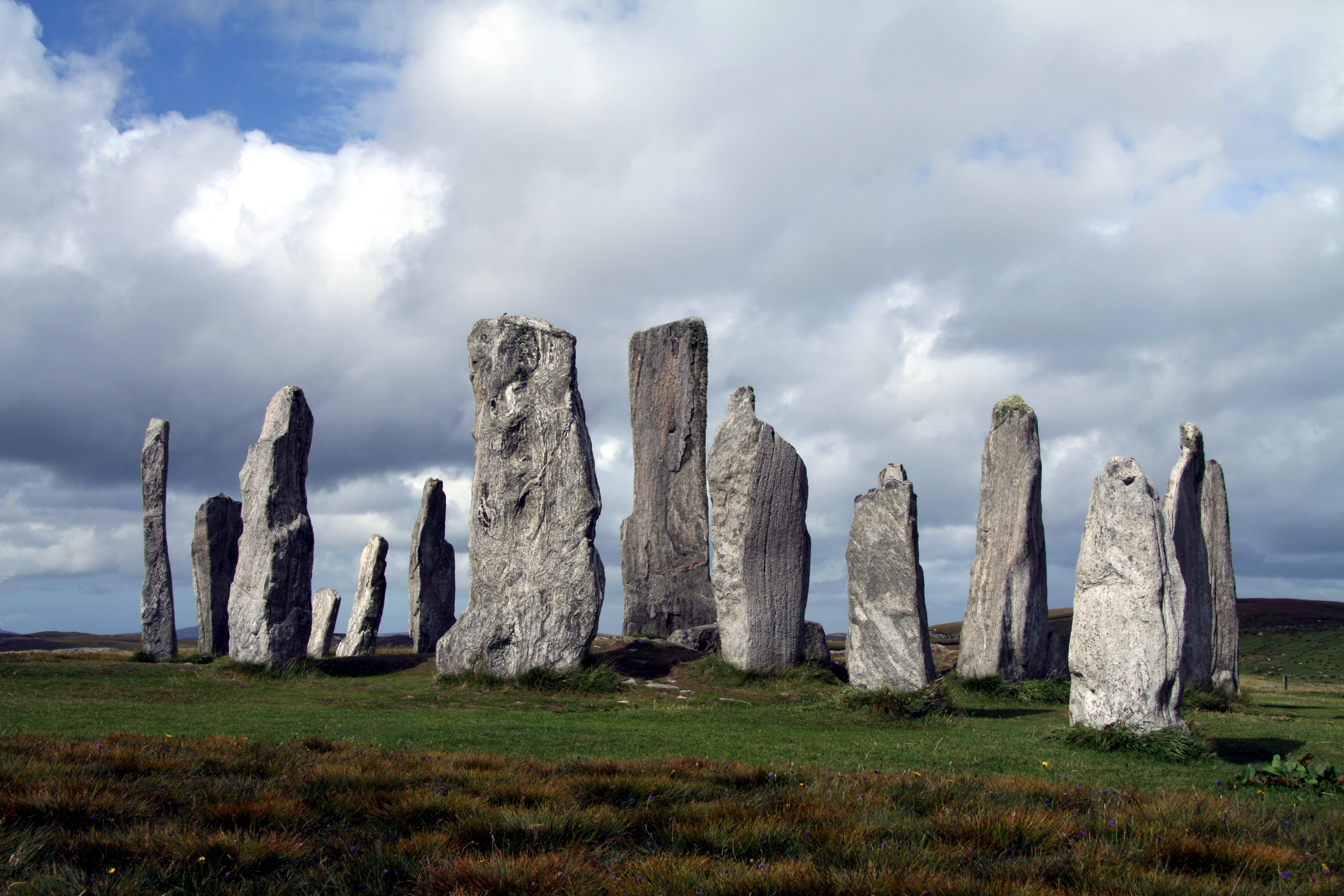
Callanish Stones

=== Film and television ===
- The Pixar animated film Brave (2012) includes several scenes set among stone circles inspired by the Callanish stones and other Scottish prehistoric monuments.
- The television series Outlander (2014), based on the novels by Diana Gabaldon, uses the stones as the model for the fictional circle Craigh na Dun, portrayed in the story as allowing time travel.

=== Visual art ===
- Sculptor Gerald Laing created a work titled Callanish (1974) for the campus of University of Strathclyde in Glasgow. The sculpture consists of sixteen upright steel girders arranged to echo the pattern of the prehistoric stones and is popularly known as "Steelhenge".

=== Other cultural references ===
- Bank of Scotland debit cards have featured an image of the stones as part of a series showing Scottish landmarks, including the Falkirk Wheel.

== Other nearby sites ==
Archaeologists usually refer to the main monument as "Calanais I", because many other prehistoric stone sites lie in the surrounding landscape. These monuments are spread across the moorland around Loch Roag and nearby islands.

=== Core Calanais ridge ===
Several monuments stand on the ridges and slopes close to the main Calanais Stones.

- Cnoc Ceann a' Ghàraidh (Callanish II) – stone circle
- Cnoc Filibhir Bheag (Callanish III) – stone circle
- Ceann Hulavig (Callanish IV) – stone circle
- Àirigh nam Bidearan (Callanish V) – stone alignment
- Cùl a' Chleit (Callanish VI) – stone circle

=== Great Bernera group ===
Two related monuments lie on the nearby island of Great Bernera, across a narrow strait from Lewis.

- Tursachan (Callanish VIII) – semicircular monument at the edge of a cliff
- Àird A' Chaolais (Calanais VIIIa) – standing stone

=== Western moor group ===
Several smaller monuments are scattered across the moorland west and southwest of the main site.

- Àirigh Nam Bidearan (Calanais IX) – stones
- Na Dromannan or Druim Nan Eun (Callanish X) – stone setting
- Beinn Bheag (Calanais XI) – standing stone; stones; cairns
- Stonefield (Calanais XII) – standing stone
- Sgeir Nan Each (Calanais XIII) – stone setting
- Cnoc Sgeir Na h-Uidhe (Calanais XIV W) – stone setting
- Cnoc Sgeir Na h-Uidhe (Calanais XIV E) – stones

=== Peripheral or uncertain sites ===
Some stones lie farther from the main monuments or survive only as possible prehistoric features.

- Àirigh Mhaoldonuich (Calanais XV) – standing stone
- Cliacabhadh (Calanais XVI) – standing stone; stones
- Druim Na h-Aon Choich (Calanais XVII) – standing stone (possible)
- Loch Crogach (Calanais XVIII) – standing stone (possible)
- Buaile Chruaidh (Calanais XIX) – standing stone (possible)

=== Other archaeological site ===
- Cnoc Dubh (Callanish VII) – ancient settlement or shieling
