= Callanish II =

Archaeological site in Outer Hebrides, Scotland

Calanais II
- Cnoc Ceann a' Gharaidh
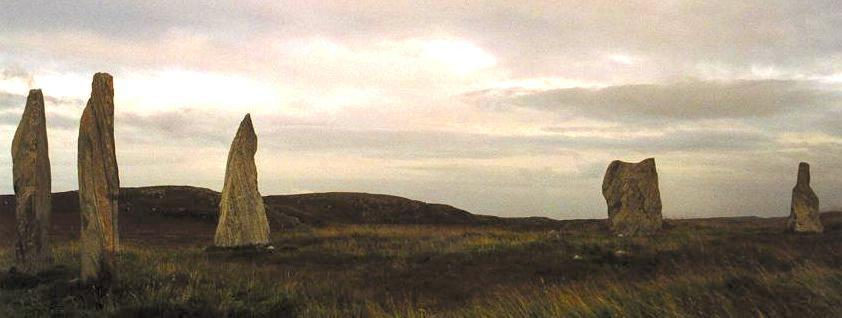
- Calanais II seen from the west

- Location within Lewis
- 58.19444°N 6.72888°W
- Type: Stone circle
- Periods: Neolithic, Bronze Age
- Location: Lewis

History
- Built: c. 2750 BC

Site notes
- Material: Stone

The Calanais II stone circle (Scottish Gaelic: Cnoc Ceann a' Gharaidh) is one of many megalithic structures around the better-known (and larger) Calanais I on the west coast of the Isle of Lewis, in the Outer Hebrides, Scotland.

== Description ==
Callanish II is situated on a ridge just 90 metres from the waters of Loch Roag. It is just a few hundred metres from the Callanish III stone circle. See Callanish IV, Callanish VIII, and Callanish X for other minor sites.

The stone circle consists of seven thin standing stones arranged in the shape of an ellipse measuring 21.6 by 18.9 metres. Five of the stones are standing and two have fallen. The stones vary from 2 to 3.3 metres in height. A slab, 1.4 metres long, lies in front of the western stone, pointing towards the centre of the circle. The stone circle surrounds a cairn with a diameter of 8.5 metres.

When 3 feet (1 metre) of peat was removed from the site in 1848, four holes were noticed, three grouped in an arc at the northwest, a fourth at the south-west. Wood charcoal found in them suggests that they formed an earlier timber circle about 10 metres in diameter.

== Callanish monuments ==
Callanish II is one of several groups of standing stones scattered across the moorland of western Lewis in the Outer Hebrides. Archaeologists often describe these sites together as the Callanish monuments. Instead of a single stone circle standing alone, the landscape around Loch Roag contains a small network of prehistoric sites built during the Neolithic.

The best known of these monuments is the nearby Callanish stone circle, often called Callanish I. Other sites lie within a few kilometres of it, including Callanish III, Callanish IV, and Callanish VIII. Each is slightly different. Some form small circles of stones, while others appear as short lines or oval groups set into the ground.

Most of the monuments stand on low ridges or gentle slopes above Loch Roag and the surrounding sea inlets. From these places there are wide views across the open moor and toward the coast. The stones often stand on slight rises where they are easy to see against the sky. In some cases it is possible that people moving across the landscape could see one group of stones from another.

Taken together, these sites suggest that the stones were never meant to stand alone. Instead they formed part of a wider ceremonial landscape used by the communities who lived along the western coast of Lewis thousands of years ago. Across the moor, people placed stone monuments in visible places overlooking land and sea, creating a network of gathering places that shaped how people moved through the landscape.

== Interpretation ==
The precise purpose of Callanish II remains uncertain, but archaeologists generally interpret the monument as part of a wider ceremonial landscape surrounding the larger Callanish I stone circle. Across the ridges above Loch Roag, numerous stone settings, circles, and alignments appear across the open moor. Taken together they form what researchers describe as the Callanish complex, a network of prehistoric monuments that turned this stretch of Lewis into a place of ritual gathering during the late Neolithic.

Excavations at Callanish II revealed that the stone circle was built on the site of an earlier timber structure. Archaeologists interpret this sequence as evidence that the location already held ceremonial importance before the stones were raised. Similar patterns, in which wooden monuments were replaced by stone settings, are known at several prehistoric sites across Great Britain and Ireland. The presence of a small cairn within the centre of the circle has also been interpreted by researchers as suggesting that the monument may have acquired funerary or commemorative significance during later phases of its use.

Rather than standing alone, Callanish II is usually interpreted by archaeologists as one element within a broader ritual landscape. From the ridges above the loch it is possible to see other prehistoric stone settings, including Callanish III and the main Callanish circle. Their placement on slight rises suggests that visibility between monuments may have been deliberate. Researchers have suggested that movement through the landscape may have formed part of ceremonial activity, with people travelling between different stone settings during seasonal events or communal gatherings.

The setting of the Callanish monuments has also encouraged interpretations linking them to observations of the sky. Some scholars have proposed that alignments between stones and distant horizons may correspond to particular positions of the sun or moon, especially during major lunar events. These astronomical interpretations remain debated, but they highlight the possibility that the monuments were intended to connect the surrounding landscape with cycles of time and season.

Whatever their precise role, monuments such as Callanish II clearly held lasting significance for the communities who lived along the western coast of Lewis. Archaeologists generally agree that these sites functioned as enduring focal points within the prehistoric landscape, places where communities gathered and marked important social or ceremonial events over many generations.
