= Garynahine Estate =

Coordinates: 58.188°N 6.702°W

Garynahine Estate: Scottish Gaelic: Gearraidh na h-aibhne
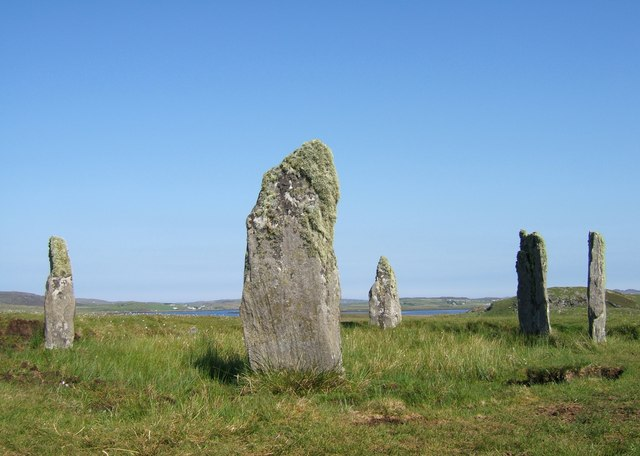
- The Callanish IV stone circle, just south of the settlement

- Location within the Outer Hebrides
- Language: Scottish Gaelic; English
- OS grid reference: NB236317
- Civil parish: Uig
- Council area: Na h-Eileanan Siar
- Lieutenancy area: Western Isles
- Country: Scotland
- Sovereign state: United Kingdom
- Post town: ISLE OF LEWIS
- Postcode district: HS2
- Dialling code: 01851
- Police: Scotland
- Fire: Scottish
- Ambulance: Scottish
- UK Parliament: Na h-Eileanan an Iar
- Scottish Parliament: Na h-Eileanan an Iar

Garynahine Estate (Scottish Gaelic: Gearraidh na h-aibhne) in Garynahine, a village on the Isle of Lewis, Outer Hebrides was owned by Sir James Matheson, born in Shiness, Lairg, Sutherland, Scotland, from 1844 to 1917. He was the son of Captain Donald Matheson, a Scottish trader in India.

It was then sold to William Lever, 1st Viscount Leverhulme, often referred to as Lord Leverhulme.

Subsequent owners Mr. McGilvray and Mr. Christopher Buxton, had the estate for many years before it was sold to the present owners in 2011 and is currently operated as a resort sporting estate for shooting, fishing and hunting.
