= Zuddas =

Zuddas is a surname. Notable people with the surname include:

- Gianluigi Zuddas (born 1943), Italian author and translator
- Giovanni Zuddas (1928–1996), Italian bantamweight professional boxer

== See also ==
- Zuidas
