= Robert J. Harris (writer) =

Scottish academic and author

- Born: 1955 (age 70–71); Dundee, Scotland, UK
- Occupations: Author; educator
- Spouse: Deborah Turner Harris
- Writing career
- Genres: Fantasy; historical; mystery; thriller
- Website: harris-authors.com

Robert J. Harris is a Scottish academic and author, particularly of children's fantasy and historical novels, best known for his collaborations with Jane Yolen. He also designed the fantasy board game Talisman and its sequel Mythgardia.

== Life ==
Harris was born in Dundee and studied at the University of St Andrews, achieving a first class honours degree in Latin. Harris lives in Scotland and is married to American author Deborah Turner Harris.

== Works ==
=== Young Heroes ===
(Written with Jane Yolen, based on stories from Greek mythology about Odysseus, Hippolyta, Atalanta, and Jason)

- Odysseus in the Serpent Maze (2001)
- Hippolyta and the Curse of the Amazons (2002)
- Atalanta and the Arcadian Beast (2003)
- Jason and the Gorgon's Blood (2004)

=== The Stuart Quartet ===
(Written with Jane Yolen)

- Queen's Own Fool (2000)
- Girl in a Cage (2002)
- Prince Across the Water (2004)
- The Rogues (2007)

=== Young Legends ===
(Young adult adventure series focusing on young versions of Leonardo da Vinci and William Shakespeare)

- Leonardo and the Death Machine (2005)
- Will Shakespeare and the Devil's Fire (2006)

=== The World Goes Loki ===
(Children's series based on Norse mythology)

- The Day the World Went Loki (2013)
- Thor Is Locked in My Garage (2014)
- Odin Blew Up My TV (2016)

=== The Artie Conan Doyle Mysteries ===
(Children's adventure series about a young Arthur Conan Doyle)

- The Gravediggers' Club (2017)
- The Vanishing Dragon (2018)
- The Scarlet Phantom (2019)

=== Richard Hannay Returns ===
(Historical thrillers featuring John Buchan's Richard Hannay character)

- The Thirty-One Kings (2017)
- Castle Macnab (2018)
- Redfalcon (2024)

=== Sherlock Holmes in WWII ===
(Sherlock Holmes pastiches set during the Second World War, based on the 1940s film series)

- A Study in Crimson (2021)
- The Devil's Blaze (2022)

=== Standalone ===
- Crescendo (2026)

=== Short fiction ===
- "The City of Brass" (with Deborah Turner Harris; in Tales of the Knights Templar, edited by Katherine Kurtz, Warner Books, 1995)
- "The Ragmore Beast" (in Bruce Coville's Book of Spine Tinglers II: More Tales to Make You Shiver, edited by Bruce Coville, Scholastic, 1997)
- "Studies in Stone" (with Jane Yolen; in In The Shadow of the Gargoyle, edited by Nancy Kilpatrick and Thomas S. Roche, Ace Books, 1998)
- "The Company of Three" (with Deborah Turner Harris; in On Crusade: More Tales of the Knights Templar, edited by Katherine Kurtz, Warner Books, 1998)
- "Carrion Crows" (with Jane Yolen; in The Crow: Shattered Lives and Broken Dreams, edited by James O'Barr and Edward E. Kramer, Del Ray, 1998)
- "Last Kingdom" (with Deborah Turner Harris; in Legends: Tales from the Eternal Archives, edited by Margaret Weis, Daw Books, 1999)
- "Straight and True" (in Sherwood, edited by Jane Yolen. Philomel Books, 1999)
- "Requiem Antarctica" (with Jane Yolen; in Asimov's Science Fiction, May 2000)
- "Old Jim Croaker Jumps Over the Moon" (in Ribbiting Tales, edited by Nancy Springer, Philomel Books, 2000)
