= The Artefacts of Power =

Fantasy novel series by Maggie Furey

The Artefacts of Power series is a tetralogy of fantasy novels written by British author Maggie Furey.

The series revolves around the character Aurian, after whom the first book is named. She is the daughter of renegade Mages Eilin and Geraint, an Earth Mage and Fire Mage, respectively, and Aurian has gained use of both of their powers in full measure. She is sent to the Mages’ Academy in the city of Nexis at a young age to learn to harness and make use of her powers. The series follows her as she flees from Nexis to the Southern Lands in search of the Artefacts of Power to aid her in her quest to defeat Miathan, the evil Archmage who was once Aurian's beloved mentor.

Terri Windling identified Aurian as one of the best fantasy debuts of 1994, describing it as "distinctive by the fact that it is quite well written".

== Books ==
- Aurian (1994), ISBN 0-09-927071-4 (UK)/ISBN 0-553-56525-7 (US)
- Harp of Winds (1995), ISBN 0-09-927081-1 (UK)/ISBN 0-553-56526-5 (US)
- Sword of Flame (1996), ISBN 0-09-927091-9 (UK)/ISBN 0-553-56527-3 (US)
- Dhiammara (1997), ISBN 0-09-969811-0 (UK)/ISBN 0-553-57557-0 (US)

The books were originally published by Legend Books, but have subsequently been re-released by Orbit Books. They were published as paperback originals by Spectra/Bantam/BDD Books in the United States.

== The artefacts ==
- The Cauldron of Rebirth
- The Staff of Earth
- The Harp of Winds
- The Sword of Flame
