= Callanish III =

Megalithic structure in Scotland, UK

- Cnoc Filibhir Bheag
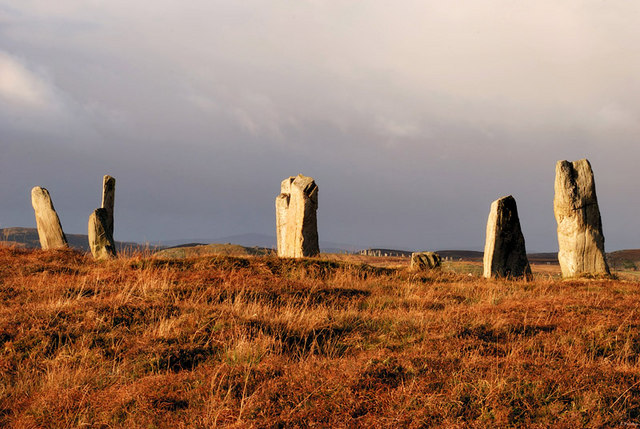
- Callanish III in 2008

- Location within Lewis
- 58°11′44″N 6°43′27″W
- Type: Stone circle
- Periods: Neolithic, Bronze Age
- Location: Lewis

History
- Built: c. 2750 BC

Site notes
- Material: Stone

The Callanish III stone circle (Scottish Gaelic: Cnoc Fillibhir Bheag) is one of many megalithic structures around the better-known (and larger) Calanais I on the west coast of the Isle of Lewis, in the Outer Hebrides, Scotland.

== Description ==
The stone circle consists of two concentric ellipses. The outer ring measures about 13.7 by 13.1 metres (45 by 43 feet). It contains 13 stones, of which eight are still standing and five have fallen. The inner ring is a pronounced oval measuring 10.5 by 6.6 metres (35 by 22 feet). Only four stones remain in the inner circle, the tallest of which measures 2.1 metres (7 feet). There is no sign of a central mound or cairn.

== Construction and dating ==
Callanish III is generally dated to the late Neolithic, when many of the stone settings across the Isle of Lewis were erected, probably between about 3000 and 2500 BC. The monument forms part of the wider group of prehistoric sites known as the Callanish monuments, which are scattered across the ridges above Loch Roag. Together these stones form one of the most concentrated ceremonial landscapes of prehistoric Great Britain.

Excavation of the site revealed that the stone circle was constructed on the location of an earlier timber monument. Postholes beneath the stones show that wooden posts once stood here, suggesting that people had already chosen this spot for gatherings or ceremonies long before the stones arrived. Similar sequences are known at several prehistoric sites across Great Britain and Ireland, where timber structures were later replaced by stone monuments. At Callanish III the stones appear to represent a later, more permanent expression of a place that had already mattered to the community.

The stones themselves were erected using slabs of Lewisian gneiss, the ancient metamorphic rock that forms the bedrock of the Isle of Lewis. Pieces of the same rock still break through the peat across the surrounding moor. Builders likely selected suitable slabs from nearby outcrops or glacial deposits and hauled them short distances before raising them upright in prepared pits. Packing stones were wedged around the bases to hold the monoliths steady.

The shift from timber monument to stone circle hints at a deeper story. Archaeologists interpret the stone phase as the monumentalisation of an older gathering place. What began as a circle of wooden posts eventually became a ring of enduring stone, anchoring the site in the landscape for generations to come. On the open moor above Loch Roag, Callanish III marks not just a construction event but the moment when a place of meeting was turned into a lasting monument.

== Callanish monuments ==
Callanish III is one of several groups of standing stones scattered across the moorland of western Lewis in the Outer Hebrides. Archaeologists often describe these sites together as the Callanish monuments. Instead of a single stone circle standing alone, the landscape around Loch Roag contains a small network of prehistoric sites built during the Neolithic.

The best known of these monuments is the nearby Callanish stone circle, often called Callanish I. Other sites lie within a few kilometres of it, including Callanish II, Callanish IV, and Callanish VIII. Each is slightly different. Some form small circles of stones, while others appear as short lines or oval groups set into the ground.

Most of the monuments stand on low ridges or gentle slopes above Loch Roag and the surrounding sea inlets. From these places there are wide views across the open moor and toward the coast. The stones often stand on slight rises where they are easy to see against the sky. In some cases it is possible that people moving across the landscape could see one group of stones from another.

Taken together, these sites suggest that the stones were never meant to stand alone. Instead they formed part of a wider ceremonial landscape used by the communities who lived along the western coast of Lewis thousands of years ago.
