= Lammas Night =

1983 fantasy novel by Katherine Kurtz

- first edition of Lammas Night
- Author: Katherine Kurtz
- Language: English
- Genre: Fantasy
- Publisher: Ballantine Books
- Publication date: 1983
- Publication place: United States
- Media type: Print (paperback)
- Pages: 438 pp
- ISBN: 0-345-29516-1
- OCLC: 10527349
- LC Class: PS3561.U69 L35 1983

Lammas Night is a fantasy novel by the American-born author Katherine Kurtz, first published in paperback by Ballantine Books in December 1983. The first hardcover edition was issued by Severn House in 1986.

== Plot ==
Lammas Night tells the story of a group of English witches who act to save their country from Nazi attack during the Second World War. Woven within the story of their efforts are the visions and fragmented memories of a male witch, who gradually comes to realize his role in an ancient cycle of royal death, reincarnation, and sacrifice.

The story opens with the British evacuation of Dunkirk in May 1940. Among the evacuees is Captain Michael Jordan, an adherent of the "Oakwood Group" of occultists based at the fictional Oakwood Manor in Kent. Jordan is officially working for MI-6, as part of their Occult Studies Division, and he is carrying sensitive information proving that Adolf Hitler is using occult means to plan for the invasion of Great Britain, an operation called Sealion.

After his safe return to Oakwood, Jordan shares this Intelligence with Colonel John "Gray" Graham, his military superior and wartime leader of the Oakwood Group. While Gray uses Jordan's collected information to plan a more conventional psychological warfare campaign against the Nazi invasion, he also attempts to unify the many disparate groups of British occultists to work in concert on Lammas night, one of the major Sabbats.

Gray is at first unsuccessful. Deeply troubled by his failure in the face of such an overwhelming national crisis, he turns to a friend for solace. This friend, once a member of Graham's Intelligence section, is the (fictional) younger brother of both King George VI and the Duke of Windsor, and is named Prince William, Duke of Clarence.

Intrigued by Gray's indirect references to occult matters during their discussions, Prince William presses Gray for more information. The Prince eventually volunteers to be the royal patron of the Oakwood Group and its Lammas night undertaking, but as Gray Graham works to develop his network of occultists the Battle of Britain reaches its crescendo. At the same time, both he and William begin to experience terrifying flashbacks regarding their past lives. In order to succeed on Lammas night both men must face and come to terms with the meaning of these experiences.

== Note ==
The events of the novel reflect an actual attempt by pagans and wiccans in Great Britain to aid the British war effort and forestall German invasion by occult means during the Second World War, as recounted in the wartime letters of Dion Fortune.
