= Mythgardia =

Fantasy board game

- Designers: Bob Harris
- Publication: 2009
- Players: 2 - 6
- Age range: 8 and up

Mythgardia is a fantasy board game designed by Bob Harris. It is a follow-up to his best selling and widely acclaimed fantasy adventure game, Talisman. Mythgardia is set in a world consisting of five Realms, each of which generates its own unique set of adventures. Characters travel around the five Realms, following clues which will lead them to the fabulous Crystal Treasures. These crystals are a source of immense power and characters will find themselves being pursued by the minions of J’Cabe, the evil arch-warlock who seeks to make himself master of Mythgardia.
