= Maggie Furey =

British fantasy writer (1955-2016)

- Born: 5 November 1955; Northumberland, England, UK
- Died: 3 November 2016 (aged 60); Cullen Upper, Three-Mile Water, County Wicklow, Ireland
- Occupation: Writer
- Writing career
- Period: 1994–2016
- Genre: Fantasy fiction
- Website: www.maggiefurey.co.uk

Maggie Furey (née Armstrong) was a British fantasy writer who was born in Northumberland, England, UK in 1955. A qualified teacher, she wrote fantasy since 1994, and is best known for the Artefacts of Power tetralogy. A resident in County Wicklow in Ireland for many years, she died there in 2016.

== Life ==
=== Career ===
Furey was a qualified teacher. She also reviewed books on BBC Radio Newcastle, was an advisor in the Durham Reading Resources Centre, and organized children's book fairs. In later life, she lived in County Wicklow in Ireland.

She died in 2016 and, after a funeral in the town of Wicklow, was cremated at Mount Jerome Cemetery.

=== Writing ===
She is best known for the Artefacts of Power tetralogy, which is centred on the lead character (and first novel namesake) Aurian, published as paperback originals in the United States and UK, as well as translated hard-covers in Russia.

==== Bibliography ====
The Artefacts of Power

- Aurian (1994), ISBN 0-09-927071-4 (UK)/ISBN 0-553-56525-7 (US) / ISBN 5-88196-703-8 (RU)
- Harp of Winds (1995), ISBN 0-09-927081-1 (UK)/ISBN 0-553-56526-5 (US) / 5-88196-814-Х (RU)
- Sword of Flame (1996), ISBN 0-09-927091-9 (UK)/ISBN 0-553-56527-3 (US) / ISBN 5-88196-842-5 (RU)
- Dhiammara (1997), ISBN 0-09-969811-0 (UK)/ISBN 0-553-57557-0 (US) / ISBN 5-15-000885-0 (RU)

The Web Series see The Web (series)

- Furey, Maggie (1998). Sorceress (in Romanian). London: Dolphin. ISBN 1-85881-551-7. OCLC 43057010.

The Shadowleague

- The Heart of Myrial (1999), ISBN 1-85723-751-X (UK)/ISBN 0-553-57938-X (US)/ISBN 5-17-009881-2 (RU)
- The Spirit of the Stone (2001), ISBN 1-85723-953-9 (UK)/ISBN 0-553-57941-X (US)/ISBN 5-17-020812-X (RU)
- The Eye of Eternity (UK) (2002), ISBN 1-84149-115-2 (UK)/Echo of Eternity (US) (2003), ISBN 0-553-58575-4, ISBN 5-9577-1645-6 (RU)

Chronicles of the Xandim

- Heritage of the Xandim (2008), ISBN 978-0-575-07665-5 (hardcover)/ISBN 9780575076624 (paperback) (both UK)
- Exodus of the Xandim (2013), ISBN 978-0-575-07663-1 (UK)
