= Callanish IV =

Stone circle in the Outer Hebrides, Scotland

Calanais IV
- Ceann Hulavig
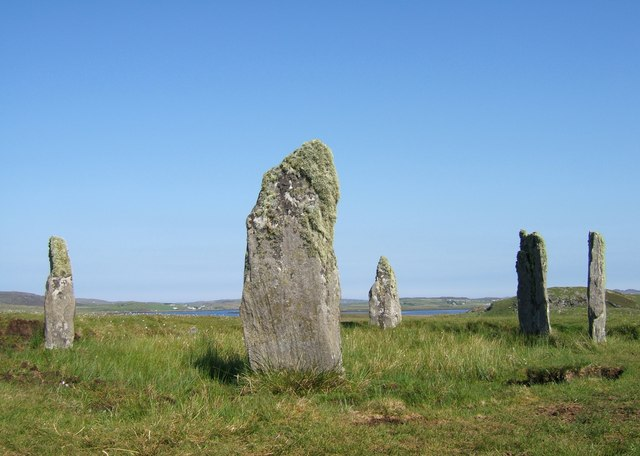
- Callanish IV in 2007

- Location within Lewis
- 58.17528°N 6.71305°W
- Type: Stone circle
- Periods: Neolithic, Bronze Age
- Location: Lewis

History
- Built: c. 2750 BC

Site notes
- Material: Stone

Callanish IV (Ceann Hulavig) is a prehistoric stone circle on the Isle of Lewis in the Outer Hebrides of Scotland. It was built during the late Neolithic period, around c. 2750 BCE, and is one of several ancient monuments in the wider Callanish complex.

The monument consists of an oval ring of standing stones with a small cairn in the centre. Only five stones remain standing today, although the circle may originally have contained as many as thirteen. The stones range in height from about 2 to 2.7 m (6.6 to 8.9 ft).

Callanish IV stands on open moorland southeast of the main Callanish I stone circle near Loch Roag. Other nearby monuments include Callanish II, Callanish III, and Callanish VIII, forming part of a wider prehistoric landscape of stone circles and settings.

The site is protected as a scheduled monument and is recognised as part of one of the most important groups of prehistoric monuments in north-western Europe.

== Name and etymology ==
Callanish IV is the modern archaeological name for the monument, though earlier Gaelic place names are recorded in historical and heritage sources.

One of these is Ceann Hulavig, a Scottish Gaelic place name associated with the area where the stones stand. The Gaelic word ceann commonly means "head", "end", or "hilltop", and often appears in place names describing the end of a ridge or a prominent point in the landscape.

In official heritage records, the monument appears under the name Sron a'Chail in the designation entry for the scheduled monument. The name comes from Scottish Gaelic. In Gaelic place names, sron usually means "nose", but in geographical terms it refers to a projecting ridge or promontory. The second element, a' Chail, refers to a narrow place in the landscape. Taken together, the name can be understood as meaning "the ridge or promontory at the narrow place".

The name Callanish IV comes from the numbering system used by archaeologists to distinguish the many prehistoric monuments in the wider Callanish complex on the Isle of Lewis in the Outer Hebrides. In this system the main monument is known as Callanish I, with nearby sites numbered sequentially as they were identified during archaeological surveys.

These different names reflect both the local Gaelic place-name tradition and the later archaeological study of the Callanish landscape.

== Location and landscape ==
Callanish IV stands on open moorland in the western part of the Isle of Lewis in the Outer Hebrides of Scotland. The monument lies about 3.2 km (2.0 mi) southeast of the main Callanish I stone circle and around 180 m (590 ft) west of the B8011 road near the settlement of Garynahine.

The surrounding landscape consists of peat-covered moorland broken by low rocky ridges and scattered outcrops of Lewisian gneiss, the ancient bedrock that forms much of the island. The circle stands on slightly raised ground within this open terrain and has wide views across the surrounding moor.

Several other prehistoric monuments lie within a few kilometres of the site. These include the main Callanish I circle as well as Callanish II, Callanish III, and Callanish VIII. Together these sites form part of the wider group of prehistoric monuments often known as the Callanish complex.

Other archaeological features lie close to the circle. A prehistoric quartz quarry is located to the southeast of the monument, while the remains of a shieling lie to the southwest.

Archaeologists have suggested that the Callanish monuments were placed in locations that connected different parts of the landscape and may have influenced how people moved across the moor. The position of Callanish IV on slightly higher ground follows a pattern seen at several Callanish sites, where the stones stand on small rises that make them visible across the surrounding landscape.

== Description ==
Callanish IV is around two miles southeast of the Callanish Stones, about 180 metres west of the unfenced B8011 road. The nearest settlement is Garynahine to its northeast.

The stone circle forms a pronounced oval measuring 13.3 by 9.5 metres. Only five stones currently stand, but there could have been as many as thirteen. The stones range in size from 2 to 2.7 metres.

In the centre is a dilapidated cairn. A small slab, 60 centimetres high, is set on edge within the cairn. To the south-east of the circle is a prehistoric quartz quarry. To the south-west is a shieling.

The site was first surveyed and recorded by RCAHMS in 1914 and again in 2009, with another survey in the 1970s by other archaeologists, but no known archaeological excavations have taken place at the stones.

== Callanish monuments ==
Callanish IV is one of several groups of standing stones scattered across the moorland of western Lewis in the Outer Hebrides. Archaeologists often describe these sites together as the Callanish monuments. Instead of a single stone circle standing alone, the landscape around Loch Roag contains a small network of prehistoric sites built during the Neolithic.

The best known of these monuments is the nearby Callanish stone circle, often called Callanish I. Other sites lie within a few kilometres of it, including Callanish II, Callanish III, and Callanish VIII. Each is slightly different. Some form small circles of stones, while others appear as short lines or oval groups set into the ground.

Most of the monuments stand on low ridges or gentle slopes above Loch Roag and the surrounding sea inlets. From these places there are wide views across the open moor and toward the coast. The stones often stand on slight rises where they are easy to see against the sky. In some cases it is possible that people moving across the landscape could see one group of stones from another.

Taken together, these sites suggest that the stones were never meant to stand alone. Instead they formed part of a wider ceremonial landscape used by the communities who lived along the western coast of Lewis thousands of years ago.

== Scheduled monument ==
The circle and cairn is a scheduled monument. It was scheduled in 1992 and the scheduled area is irregular, the longest aspect is 410m long, north–south. It covers the cairn and an area around those in which buried evidence may survive below the peat. Though it may also be to preserve the sighting lines from the circle.

The statement of national importance says of the site:

"The monument is of national importance as a very fine field monument, a small circle with central burial cairn. The undisturbed deep peat around it gives it the potential for recovery of information regarding contemporary landuse and economy, and possibly other structural evidence. It is also of national importance as a member of the Callanish group of circles, settings and cairns ('Callanish IV'). Together, this complex is one of the most remarkable Neolithic/Bronze Age site assemblages in N W Europe, and holds great potential for further studies into the date, nature and purpose of megalithic stone circles and settings."

== Images ==
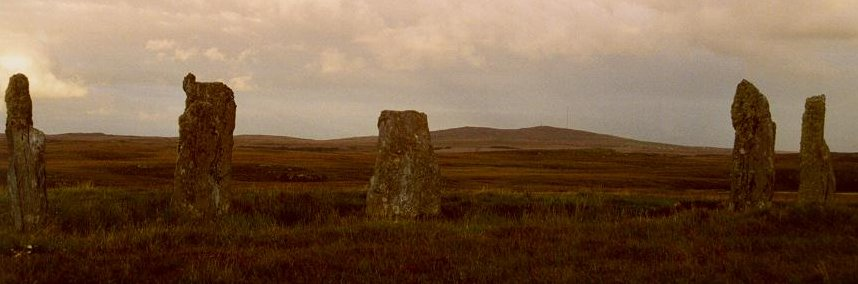

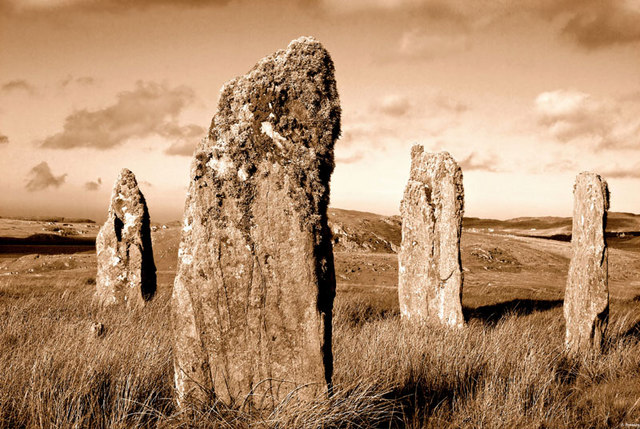

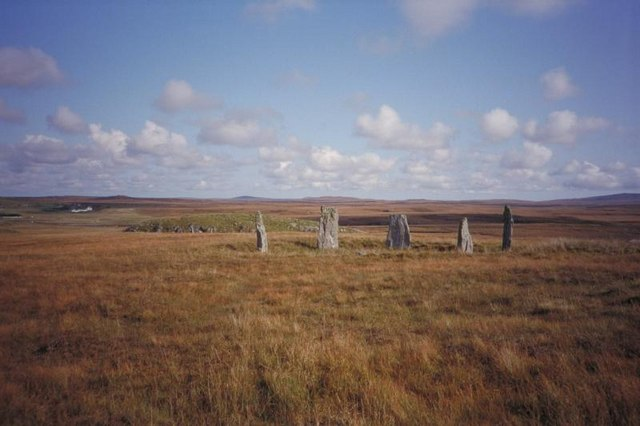

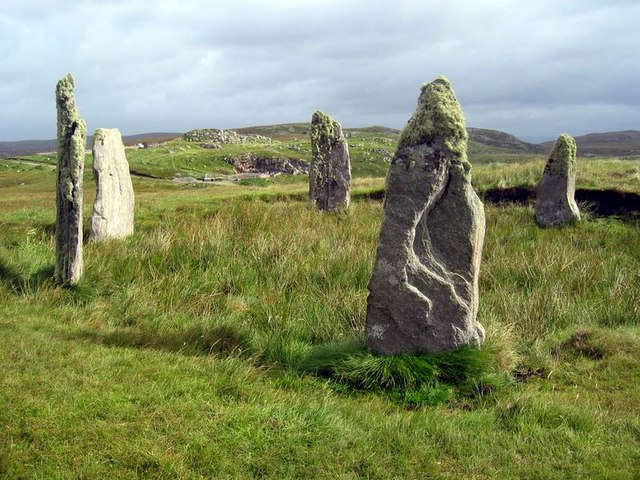

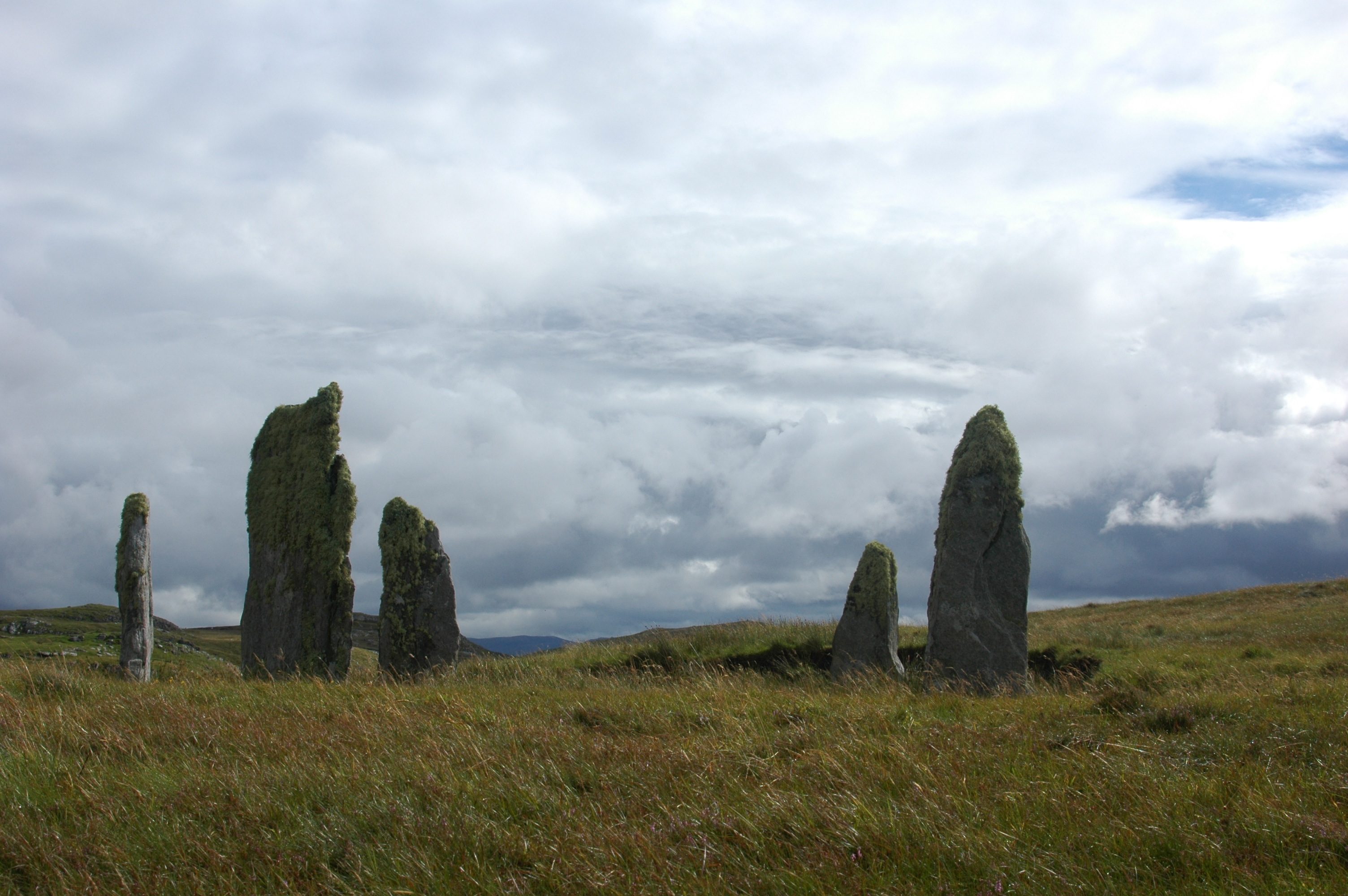

Media related to Callanish IV at Wikimedia Commons
