= Arthur H. Landis =

American novelist

Landis as topographer for the Mackenzie–Papineau Battalion in Spain, November 1937

Arthur Harold Landis (1917 – January 1986) was an American fantasy, fiction and non-fiction author.

== Biography ==
Born at Birmingham, Alabama, to a family of vaudeville performers, Landis later travelled throughout the American West working at a variety of jobs. In 1937 he enlisted in the Mackenzie-Papineau Battalion of the International Brigade in Spain during the civil war, serving as a scout and artillery spotter. He served in the battles of Aragon and Teruel. Before departing Spain, he was able to load his unit's archives onto a ship that left the country.

Landis' fantasy novel A World Called Camelot was published in 1965. He founded in 1969, the horror- and fantasy-fiction magazine Coven 13 which serialized the novel as Let There Be Magick! under the name James R. Keaveny, along with publishing the work of a number of other writers. The novel was reprinted in book form in 1976, under the "Camelot" title and his own name. He later published the sequels Camelot in Orbit (1978) and The Magick of Camelot (1981) as well as the thematically similar Home to Avalon (1982).

Landis and Mandy Harriman, also a veteran of the International Brigade, founded Camelot Publishing, whose publications included the magazine Coven 13, which printed a variety of fantasy and witchcraft stories, including the two-part story Let There Be Magick under the pen name of James R. Keaveny. He also published Dealer's Voice, a motorcycle magazine.

A non-fiction book by Landis The Abraham Lincoln Brigade was published in 1967, the result of many years of research and interviews with survivors of the Brigade. In 1972 he published Spain the Unfinished Revolution through Camelot Publishing. He was awarded the Order of Friendship of Peoples by the Soviet Union.

Landis died of bone cancer in Los Angeles in 1986.

Two years after his death, Death in the Olive Groves: American Volunteers in the Spanish Civil War 1936-1939, a re-edited and shorter version of his The Abraham Lincoln Brigade, was published.
