= Aurian =

Aurian is the first novel in Maggie Furey's fantasy series The Artefacts of Power.

== Plot summary ==
Aurian is a young person who has inherited magical powers that are coveted by powerful people. The book follows the complex series of events that ensues.
