= Angus Wells =

British writer (1943–2006)

- Born: March 26, 1943
- Died: April 11, 2006 (aged 63)
- Occupation: Novelist
- Writing career
- Genres: fantasy, westerns

Angus Wells (26 March 1943 – 11 April 2006) was a British writer of genre fiction, including fantasy and westerns.

Wells wrote under numerous pseudonyms, including Andrew Quiller (with Kenneth Bulmer and Laurence James), James A. Muir, Charles R. Pike (with Kenneth Bulmer and Terry Harknett), William S. Brady (with John Harvey), J. D. Sandon (with John Harvey), Charles C. Garrett (with Laurence James), Richard Kirk (with Robert Holdstock), J. B. Dancer (with John Harvey), and Ian Evans.

== Bibliography ==
=== Novels ===
==== Exiles ====
1. Exile's Children (1995)
2. Exile's Challenge (1996)

==== Godwars ====
1. Forbidden Magic (1991)
2. Dark Magic (1992)
3. Wild Magic (1993)

==== Book of the Kingdoms ====
1. Wrath of Ashar (1988)
2. The Usurper (1989)
3. The Way Beneath (1990)

=== Standalone novels ===
- Return of a Man Called Horse (1976)
- Star Maidens (1977) (as Ian Evans)
- Brothers McGregor (1985)
- Lords of the Sky (1994)
- The Guardian (1998)
- Yesterday's King (2001)

=== Novels as Andrew Quiller ===
==== The Eagles ====
1. The Hill of the Dead (1975)
2. The Land of Mist (1976)
3. City of Fire (1976)
4. Blood on the Sand (1977)
5. Sea of Swords (1977)

=== Novels as Charles R. Pike ===
==== Jubal Cade ====
1. The Killing Trail (1974)
2. Double Cross (1974)
3. The Hungry Gun (1975)
4. Killer Silver (1975)
5. Vengeance Hunt (1976)
6. The Burning Man (1976)
7. The Golden Dead (1976)
8. Death Wears Grey (1976)
9. Days of Blood (1977)
10. The Killing Ground (1977)
11. Brand of Vengeance (1978)
12. Bounty Road (1978)
13. Ashes and Blood (1979)
14. The Death Pit (1980)
15. Angel of Death (1980)
16. Mourning is Red (1981)
17. Bloody Christmas (1981)
18. Time of the Damned (1982)
19. The Waiting Game (1982)
20. Spoils of War (1982)
21. The Violent Land (1983)
22. Gallows Bait (1983)

=== Novels as Richard Kirk ===
==== Raven ====
1. Swordsmistress of Chaos (1978) with Robert Holdstock
2. A Time of Ghosts (1978) with Robert Holdstock
3. The Frozen God (1978)
4. Lords of the Shadows (1979) with Robert Holdstock
5. A Time of Dying (1979)

=== Novels as William S. Brady ===
==== Hawk ====
1. The Sudden Guns (1979)
2. Blood Money (1979)
3. Death's Bounty (1979)
4. Killing Time (1980)
5. Fool's Gold (1980)
6. Blood Kin (1980)
7. The Gates of Death (1980)
8. Desperadoes (1981)
9. The Widowmaker (1981)
10. Dead Man's Hand (1981)
11. Sierra Gold (1982)
12. Death and Jack Shade (1982)
13. Killer's Breed (1982)
14. Border War (1983)
15. Killer! (1983)

==== Peacemaker ====
1. Comanche! (1981)
2. Outlaws (1981)
3. Whiplash (1981)
4. Lynch Law (1981)
5. Blood Run (1982)
6. War-Party (1983)
7. $1,000 Death (1984)
8. The Lost (1984)
9. Shoot-Out (1984)

=== Novels as James A. Muir ===
==== Breed ====
1. The Lonely Hunt (1976)
2. The Silent Kill (1977)
3. Cry For Vengeance (1977)
4. Death Stage (1977)
5. The Gallows Tree (1978)
6. The Judas Goat (1978)
7. Time of the Wolf (1978)
8. Blood Debt (1979)
9. Blood-Stock! (1979)
10. Outlaw Road (1979)
11. The Dying and the Damned (1980)
12. Killer's Moon (1980)
13. Bounty Hunter! (1980)
14. Spanish Gold (1981)
15. Slaughter Time (1981)
16. Bad Habits (1981)
17. The Day of the Gun (1982)
18. The Colour of Death (1982)
19. Blood Valley (1983)
20. Gundown! (1983)
21. Blood Hunt (1984)
22. Apache Blood (1985)

=== Novels as J. D. Sandon ===
==== Gringos ====
1. Guns Across the River (1979)
2. Cannons in the Rain (1979)
3. Fire in the Wind (1979)
4. Border Affair (1979)
5. Easy Money (1980)
6. Mazatlan (1980)
7. One Too Many Mornings (1981)
8. Wheels of Thunder (1981)
9. Durango (1982)
10. Survivors (1982)

=== Novels as Charles C. Garrett ===
==== Gunslinger ====
1. The Massacre Trail (1977)
2. The Golden Gun (1978)
3. White Apache (1978)
4. Fifty Calibre Kill (1978)
5. Arizona Bloodline (1979)
6. Rebel Vengeance (1979)
7. Death Canyon (1979)
8. Peacemaker! (1980)
9. The Russian Lode (1980)
10. Blood Target (1981)

=== Novels as J. B. Dancer ===
==== The Lawmen ====
1. Evil Breed (1977)
2. Kansas, Bloody Kansas (1977)
3. Judgement Day (1978)
4. Vengeance Trail (1978)
5. The Hanged Man (1979)
6. One Way to Die (1980)
