= Garynahine =

Coordinates: 58.188°N 6.702°W

Garynahine: Scottish Gaelic: Gearraidh na h-aibhne
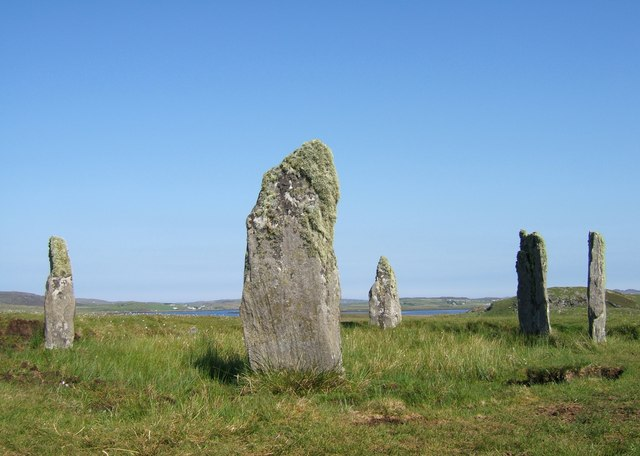
- The Callanish IV stone circle, just south of the settlement

- Location within the Outer Hebrides
- Language: Scottish Gaelic; English
- OS grid reference: NB236317
- Civil parish: Uig
- Council area: Na h-Eileanan Siar
- Lieutenancy area: Western Isles
- Country: Scotland
- Sovereign state: United Kingdom
- Post town: ISLE OF LEWIS
- Postcode district: HS2
- Dialling code: 01851
- Police: Scotland
- Fire: Scottish
- Ambulance: Scottish
- UK Parliament: Na h-Eileanan an Iar
- Scottish Parliament: Na h-Eileanan an Iar

Garynahine (Scottish Gaelic: Gearraidh na h-aibhne) is a settlement on Lewis, in the Outer Hebrides, Scotland. Garynahine is situated at a T-junction where roads from Stornoway, Uig and the west side of Lewis all meet. The roads are the A858 and the B8011. Garynahine is within the parish of Uig.

== Heritage sites and attractions ==
In the surrounding ares is the Garynahine Estate which was owned by Sir James Matheson from 1844 to 1917, before it was then sold it to Lord Leverhulme. It is currently operated as a sporting estate for hunting, shooting and fishing. On the estate is Garynahine Lodge, a Category B listed building, which is a shooting lodge, since 1925, formerly the 19th century Garynahine Hotel and it may incorporate parts of the inn that existed there from at least 1720.

To the south of Garynahine are three scheduled monuments Cul a'Chleit, Airidh nam Bidearan and Sron a'Chail. Sron a'Chail is a circle of standing stones surrounding a burial cairn which dates to the late Neolithic or early Bronze Age. It consists of 5 upright and 1 fallen standing stone surrounding what appears to be a burial cairn. It is better known as one of the outliers of the Callanish stones ('Ceann Hulavig'), specifically Callanish IV. It is also near a prehistoric quartz quarry. Airidh nam Bidearan consists of three upright stone slabs and possibly to other nearby stones. Cul a'Chleit is two standing stones on a rocky knoll. It is thought that the stones are probably the remains of a larger circle that was mostly destroyed by the construction of nearby shielings.

== Archaeology ==
In 2002, Mr Donald Angus Mackay, discovered a number of flat stone slabs, during annual peat cutting, that were thought to be a cist burial. However, excavations by Northamptonshire Archaeology, working for Glasgow University Archaeological Research Division (GUARD) as part of the Historic Scotland Human Remains Call Off Contract (now Historic Environment Scotland), discovered that it was in fact a pit containing what is believed to be a hazel wicker structure or basket. Analysis of the botanical remains indicated that heather and Sphagnum moss might have been incorporated into or deposited in the structure/basket. Radiocarbon dates suggesting the structure/basket was constructed and deposited during the Late Bronze Age.

== Images ==
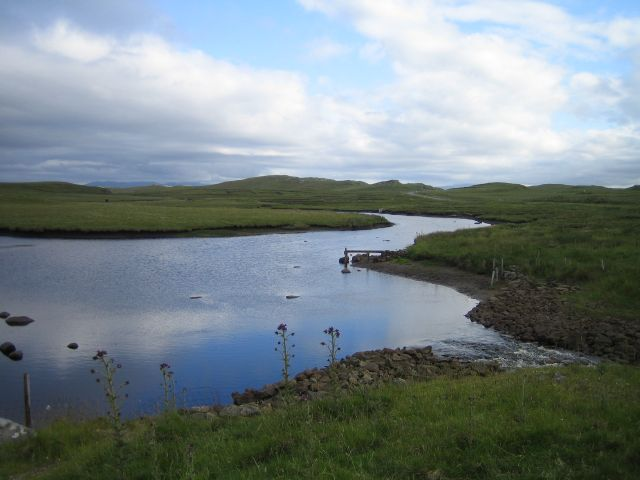
Abhainn Dhubh. The river Blackwater at Garynahine.

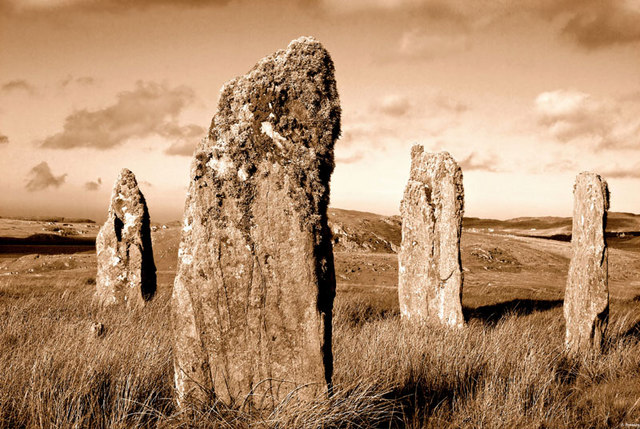
Callanish IV

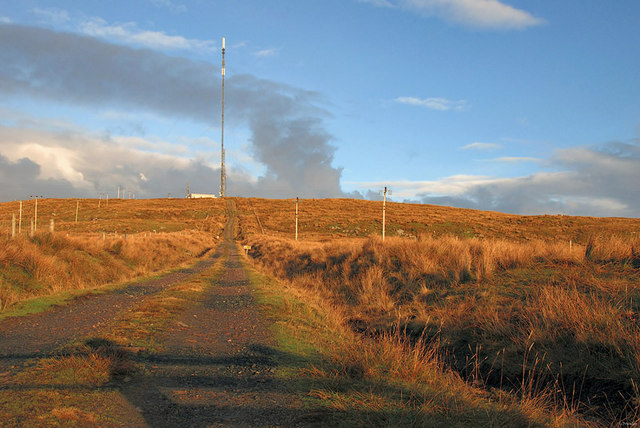
Track to Eitshal
