= Ann Marston =

American archer (1938–1971)

Ann Penelope Marston
- Marston in 1957
- Born: August 7, 1938; London, England
- Died: March 6, 1971 (aged 32); Detroit, Michigan, U.S.
- Resting place: Michigan Memorial Park
- Occupations: Archer, beauty pageant contestant, rock band manager
- Years active: 1947–1971

Ann Penelope Marston (August 7, 1938 – March 6, 1971) was an American archery champion, beauty pageant contestant and rock band manager. She was the U.S.A. National Archery Champion from 1949 to 1960, and was the first woman professional archer.

Born in England, Marston won her first target archery title there when she was 9. In 1948, at age 10, she appeared in a short documentary film called Junior Toxopholist, practicing archery with her father Frank Marston. The film was produced by Pathé News.

One week after moving to Wyandotte, Michigan, with her parents in 1949, she won her Cadet archery title, breaking all records as a junior until 1953. She was hospitalized for a week in 1951 and that resulted in a diagnosis of Type 1 diabetes. She was insulin dependent until her death.

In 1954, she began competing in the Adult division at the age of 15; she competed in the National Field Tournament and won, establishing three new records. Marston won a total of 11 national archery titles and established all-time records; she was also an accomplished singer and horsewoman.

Marston appeared as a contestant on the CBS television program, I've Got a Secret, on the August 3, 1955 episode.

With her bow and arrow, Marston was pictured on the cover of the August 8, 1955, edition of Sports Illustrated. She appeared on many national TV shows, including The Ed Sullivan Show, Captain Kangaroo, Who Do You Trust?, The Linkletter Show, The Today Show, You Asked For It, The Ernie Kovacs Show, Truth or Consequences, and What's My Line?.

She was elected to the Michigan Sports Hall of Fame, and was its youngest member.

Marston won the Miss Michigan title in 1959, and competed in the Miss America 1960 pageant, where her archery performance won the talent award. In 1962, she appeared with her father in a nine-minute documentary film for Paramount Pictures called Bow Jests. Shortly thereafter, her vision began to deteriorate, and she had to retire from competitive archery.

In 1962, she was appearing at a rodeo in Fort Madison, Iowa when she was trampled by an escaped bull. She was hospitalized with three broken ribs and a deep laceration on her leg. Her father, who tried to defend her from the bull, was badly bruised. They filed a lawsuit, and in 1965, as the result of a jury trial, Ann was awarded $12,000 and her father $2,000. She shared the proceeds equally with her father, and they both received $7000 minus lawyer's fees

In late 1963, like millions of American young people, she became an enthusiastic fan of The Beatles. She wrote a lengthy letter to George Harrison, bought all their albums, and compiled a scrap book with photos of each of them and details about their individual quirks and personal lives. The Beatles first performed in Detroit on September 6, 1964. Due to her local celebrity status, she had a half hour phone conversation with John Lennon, attended their press conference and saw the concert. That day represented a turning point in her life, and she shifted from professional archer to rock band promoter.

In the mid-1960s, she became the manager of several rock bands including the MC5, and continued performing as a singer. In 1965, she booked the MC5 as the opening act for the Dave Clark 5, which was a career breakthrough for the band. Realizing that she was unable to take the band to national stardom due to her health problems, she stepped aside as manager, and John Sinclair took over that role.

About two years before her death, she became almost completely blind because of complications of diabetes. She died from a stroke, caused by diabetes, at age 32. Her friend Joe DiMaggio attended her funeral, and Johnny Carson sent flowers. There were 100 cars in her funeral procession.

She was inducted into the Archery Hall of Fame in 1978.

| Preceded by Patience Pierce Panski | Miss Michigan; 1959 | Succeeded by Nancy Fleming |
