= Callanish VIII =

Megalith in the Outer Hebrides, Scotland

- Tursachan
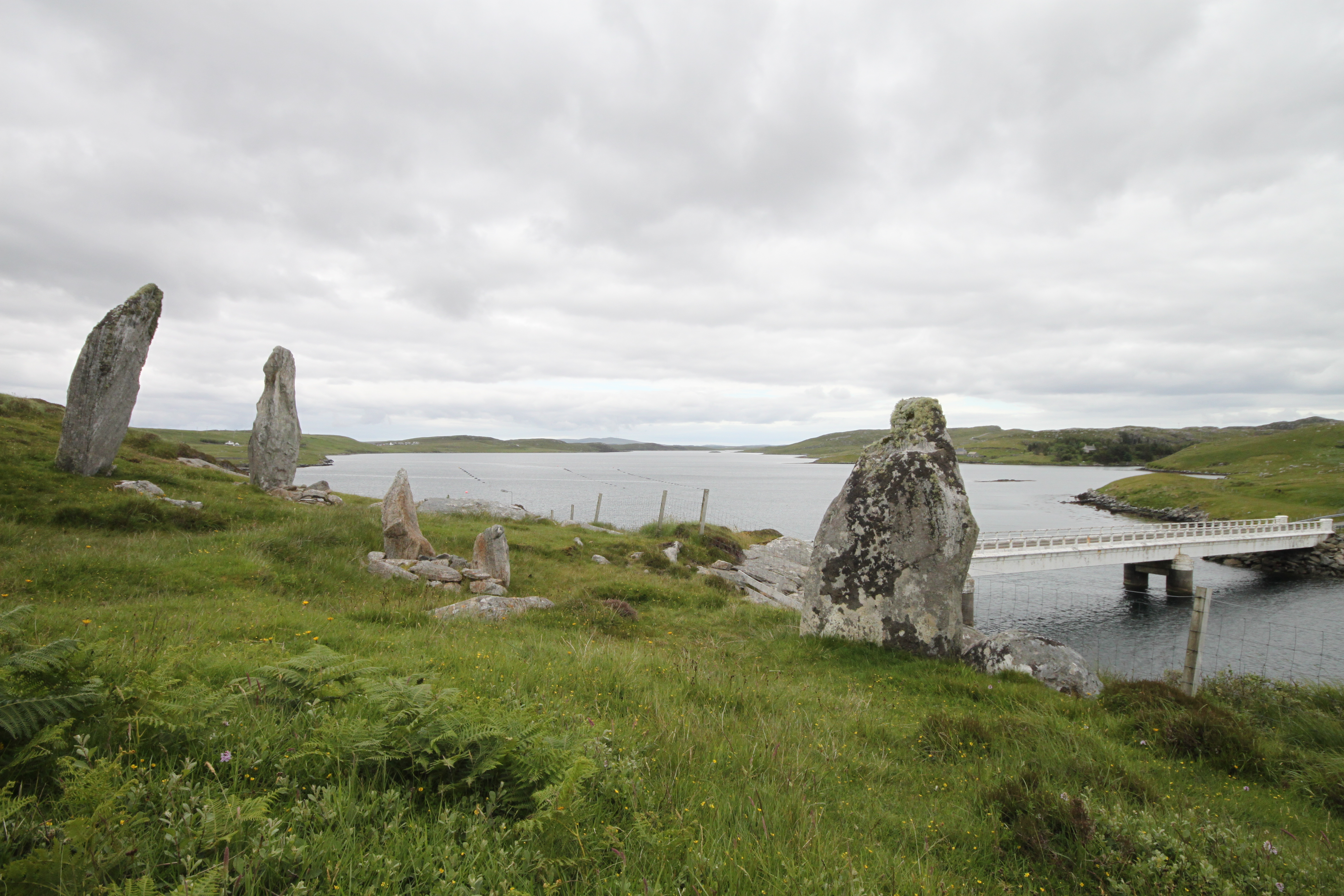
- The stones in 2013

- Location on Lewis
- 58.20554°N 6.82906°W
- Type: Standing stones
- Periods: Neolithic, Bronze Age
- Location: Lewis, Scotland, United Kingdom

History
- Built: c. 2750 BC

Site notes
- Material: Stone

The Callanish VIII stone setting is one of many megalithic structures around the better-known (and larger) Calanais I on the west coast of the Isle of Lewis, in the Outer Hebrides (Western Isles), Scotland. It is also known locally as Tursachan.

== Name and etymology ==
The site is known in English as Callanish VIII (or Calanais VIII), part of the modern archaeological numbering system used for the wider Callanish (Calanais) complex of prehistoric monuments.

It is also known locally in Scottish Gaelic as Tursachan.

- Tursa (singular), Tursachan (plural), is the Gaelic term for "standing stones" (menhirs or monoliths). The name therefore simply means "the standing stones" (of the area).

This name is used both for the main Calanais Stones (Tursachan Chalanais) and for this smaller site on Great Bernera. Another Gaelic name recorded for the monument is Cleitir.

The use of Tursachan as a local name reflects the longstanding Gaelic tradition of referring to prehistoric standing stones with this specific term, as seen across the Hebrides. The numbering Callanish VIII is a modern convention used by archaeologists to distinguish the various stone settings in the Calanais landscape.

== Description ==
Callanish VIII consists of a semicircle of four large standing stones arranged along the edge of a cliff on the southern side of Great Bernera. The setting overlooks a narrow strait separating Bernera from the Isle of Lewis. Unlike many other monuments in the Callanish monuments group, the setting appears to have been intentionally constructed as a semicircle rather than a complete ring.

The tallest stone stands nearly 3 m (9.8 ft) high. The arrangement of the stones along the cliff-edge axis suggests a diameter of about 20 m (66 ft) for the monument.

The stones are slabs of Lewisian gneiss, the ancient metamorphic rock that forms the bedrock of the Isle of Lewis and the surrounding islands. They appear to have been selected from nearby outcrops or glacial deposits and retain the rough natural surfaces typical of gneiss slabs.

A distinctive feature of the site is a shallow natural rock basin beside the stones. This hollow lies in exposed bedrock and often fills with rainwater, forming a small pool next to the monument.

The stones vary in height and stand either upright or leaning slightly. Together they form a small enclosure beside the basin on peat-covered moorland with patches of exposed rock around it. Although modest in scale, Callanish VIII forms part of the wider network of prehistoric monuments known as the Callanish stones.

== Callanish monuments ==
Callanish VIII is one of several groups of standing stones scattered across the moorland of western Lewis in the Outer Hebrides. Archaeologists often describe these sites together as the Callanish monuments. Instead of a single stone circle standing alone, the landscape around Loch Roag contains a small network of prehistoric sites built during the Neolithic.

The best known of these monuments is the nearby Callanish stone circle, often called Callanish I. Other sites lie within a few kilometres of it, including Callanish II, Callanish III, and Callanish IV. Each is slightly different. Some form small circles of stones, while others appear as short lines or oval groups set into the ground.

Most of the monuments stand on low ridges or gentle slopes above Loch Roag and the surrounding sea inlets. From these places there are wide views across the open moor and toward the coast. The stones often stand on slight rises where they are easy to see against the sky. In some cases it is possible that people moving across the landscape could see one group of stones from another.

Taken together, these sites suggest that the stones were never meant to stand alone. Instead they formed part of a wider ceremonial landscape used by the communities who lived along the western coast of Lewis thousands of years ago.
