= Gianluigi Zuddas =

Gianluigi Zuddas (born 1943) is an Italian author and translator of science fiction. His first novel, Amazon, won a Premio Italia prize.

== Early life ==
Zuddas was born at Carpi, near Modena, but moved to Livorno with his family when he was very young. Many biographies list the latter as his birthplace. His father was a non-commissioned Navy officer. He was a keen reader of Salgari, Zane Grey and Steinbeck as a child. He took a liking to Frederik Pohl and Robert Sheckley's sociological science fiction as well as Jack Vance's stories in his early teens.

== Literary career ==
He tried his hand at various jobs including metal worker, mechanic, technician in medical radiology, and painter, before deciding to write fantasy stories. His first novel, Amazon, won a prize in Italy. After 1989, translation jobs did not leave much time for him to go on with his own writing. Despite this, in 2006 he released a novel entitled C'era una volta un computer ("There Was Once a Computer") which was featured in the sci-fi magazine Urania the following year. In that novel, Zuddas reviewed, remade, and expanded on his previous story, "Le armi della Lupa.

In Zuddas' stories, the main character is usually female. His Amazons are more realistic than the more fantastical ones that readers and movie-goers generally observe in other works.

Zuddas considers his Amazon stories as heroic fantasies. He prefers human-centred explanations over events and phenomena in which one attempts to locate extraterrestrial beings.

== Works ==
=== Novels ===
- Amazon (1978)
- Balthis, l'avventuriera (1983)
- Le amazzoni del Sud (1983)
- Stella di Gondwana (1983)
- Le guerrieri degli abissi (1983)
- Il volo dell'angelo (1984)
- Le armi della Lupa (1989)
- C'era una volta un computer (2006)

=== Short stories ===
- L'amazzone e il sacerdote (1979)
- Per cercare Aurade (1981)
- Mitis degli Alicorni (1982)
- Babeeri (1982)
- Il ritorno di Lupa Bianca (1984)
- Luci di cristallo (1985)
