= Deborah Turner Harris =

American novelist

- Born: March 4, 1951 (age 75); Meadville, Pennsylvania, U.S.
- Occupation: Author
- Spouse: Robert J. Harris
- Writing career
- Genre: Fantasy
- Website: www.harris-authors.com

Deborah Turner Harris (born March 4, 1951) is an American fantasy author, best known for her collaborations with Katherine Kurtz.

== Life ==
Born in 1951 in Pennsylvania, Harris lives in Scotland and is married to Scottish author Robert J. Harris.

== Works ==
=== Mages of Garillon ===
1. The Burning Stone (1986)
2. The Gauntlet of Malice (1987)
3. Spiral of Fire (1989)

=== Caledon ===
1. Caledon of the Mists (1994)
2. The Queen of Ashes (1995)
3. The City of Exile (1997)

=== The Adept ===
(with Katherine Kurtz)

- Book I: The Adept (1991)
- Book II: The Lodge of the Lynx (1992)
- Book III: The Templar Treasure (1993)
- Book IV: Dagger Magic (1995)
- Book V: Death of an Adept (1996)

=== Knights Templar books ===
(with Katherine Kurtz)

- Book I: The Temple and the Stone (1998)
- Book II: The Temple and the Crown (April 2001)
