= Katherine Kurtz =

American fantasy writer (born 1944)

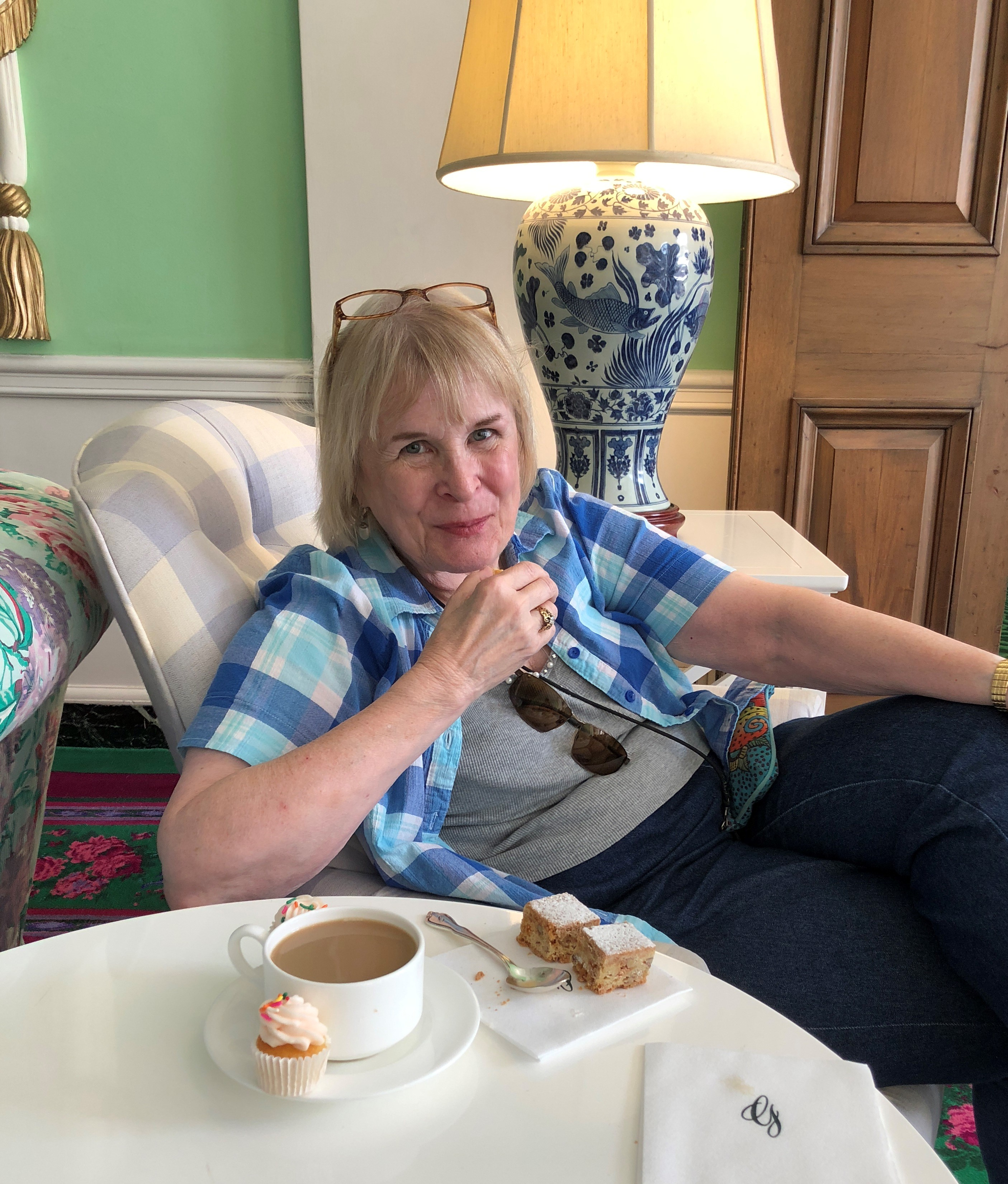
- Kurtz in 2018
- Born: October 18, 1944 (age 81); Coral Gables, Florida, U.S.
- Education: University of Miami (BS); University of California, Los Angeles (MA)
- Occupation: Novelist
- Writing career
- Genre: Fantasy
- Notable work: Deryni novels
- Website: www.rhemuthcastle.com

Katherine Irene Kurtz (born October 18, 1944) is an American fantasy writer, author of sixteen historical fantasy novels in the Deryni series, as well as occult and urban fantasy. Resident in Ireland for over twenty years, she moved to Virginia in 2007.

== Early life and education ==
Kurtz was born on October 18, 1944, in Coral Gables, Florida, where she also grew up. She secured a scholarship to study chemistry and graduated with a B.S. in chemistry from the University of Miami, later attending medical school for a year and taking an M.A. in Medieval History at UCLA. While pursuing her Masters, she worked for the Los Angeles Police Academy and began writing her first novels. She also worked in oceanography and television.

== Career ==
Kurtz is best known for the Deryni novels and short stories. Her 1970 debut novel, Deryni Rising, was one of the first fantasy novels written in a mode closer to historical fiction than to mythology or legend, as was common in the then-popular high fantasy works such as those by J. R. R. Tolkien. Writing in Strange Horizons, Kari Sperring calls Kurtz the "first writer of secondary-world historical fantasy", noting her close attention to the importance of faith in pre-modern Western societies and her portrayal of magic as a formal, ritual practice as opposed to the "picaresque and informal" way magic was depicted in other fantasy of the time.

She also wrote several occult alternate history novels in her Templar series, and urban fantasy novels in her Adept series.

Kurtz has a weekly chat with her fan base about her writing, life, cats, and many other subjects.

== Personal life ==
Kurtz married Scott MacMillan in 1983; they have one son, Cameron. Within the following couple of years they moved to Ireland. Both later became naturalized Irish citizens. Until 2007, they lived at Holybrooke (Hollybrook) Hall, in the largest of four houses formed from the original historic building, between Kilmacanogue and Bray in County Wicklow, Ireland. Kurtz wrote, and Macmillan, who had worked in the film industry, took a role as a herald in the Office of the Chief Herald of Ireland. They put their Irish home on the market in 2006 for 3.5 million euro, and in 2007 moved back to the United States, to a historic house in Staunton, Virginia. MacMillan died in 2019.

== Partial bibliography ==
=== Deryni universe ===
The first novel in the series to be published was Deryni Rising in 1970, and the most recent, The King's Deryni, was published in 2014. As of 2016, the series consists of five trilogies, one stand-alone novel, various short stories, and two reference books.

=== The Adept ===
(with Deborah Turner Harris)

- Book I: The Adept (1991)
- Book II: The Lodge of the Lynx (1992)
- Book III: The Templar Treasure (1993)
- Book IV: Dagger Magic (1995)
- Book V: Death of an Adept (1996)

=== Templar books ===
(with Deborah Turner Harris)

- Book I: The Temple and the Stone (1998)
- Book II: The Temple and the Crown (April 2001)

=== Other ===
- Lammas Night (1983)
- The Legacy of Lehr (1986)
- Two Crowns for America (1996)
- Saint Patrick's Gargoyle (2001; paperback January 2002)

=== Collaborations ===
A partial list of works Kurtz has edited or contributed follows:

- Knights of the Blood (1993; written by Scott MacMillan, lightly edited by Katherine Kurtz)
- Knights of the Blood: At Sword's Point (August 1994; written by Scott MacMillan, lightly edited by Katherine Kurtz)
- Tales of the Knights Templar (1995; edited by Katherine Kurtz, with a contributed story entitled Obligations)
- On Crusade: More Tales of the Knights Templar (1998; edited by Katherine Kurtz, with a contributed story)
- Crusade of Fire: Mystical Tales of the Knights Templar (2002; edited by Katherine Kurtz, with a contributed story)

In addition, she has contributed to a number of anthologies.
