= Loch Ròg =

Sea loch in Outer Hebrides, Scotland

Coordinates: 58°12′6″N 6°53′39″W

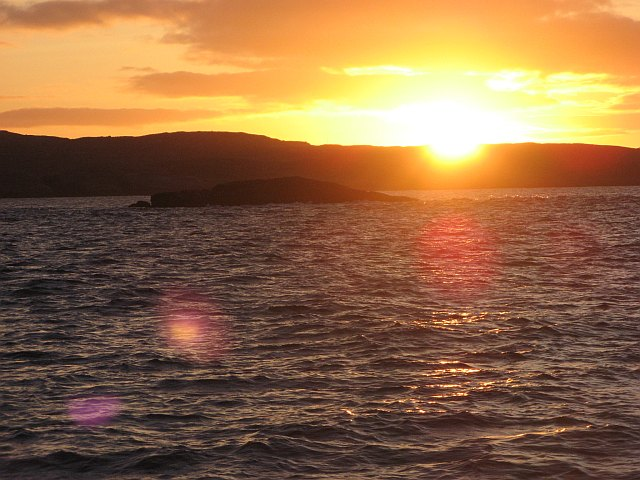
Loch Ròg

Loch Ròg or Loch Roag is a large sea loch on the west coast of Lewis, Outer Hebrides. It is broadly divided into East Loch Roag and West Loch Roag with other branches which include Little Loch Roag. The loch is dominated by the only inhabited island Great Bernera and East Loch Roag is actually referred to as Loch Bernera on early maps, most notably Murdoch MacKenzie's original Admiralty Chart from 1776. The use of west and east to differentiate the sections of the loch appear from the original Ordnance Survey in the 19th century.

== History ==
The burial of a Norse woman was discovered at Cnìp (Kneep), at the Bhaltos peninsula area of Loch Roag. Even older human settlement has also been seen in the archaeology of the area. Dun Carloway broch was the site of the discovery of traces of the Beaker people. There is a recreated Iron Age house at Bòstadh, Bernera where a village of cellular buildings of that era were uncovered in 1996.

The Callanish Stones in the Loch Ròg area were erected roughly 5,000 years ago: during the late Neolithic or the early Bronze Age. One summary of the research states that this stone circle is believed to have been "used as a lunar observatory. In particular to determine when lunar eclipses would occur".

== Fish farming ==
Loch Ròg is an important area for aquaculture and there are four fish-farming companies operating in the area, two are multi-nationals and the other two are locally owned. The farming of salmon in the loch caused controversy following a huge die off of wild Atlantic salmon in the Blackwater River, which flows into the sea loch. The wild salmon were in poor condition and had been subject to higher than normal levels of attack by sea lice. Investigators found levels of sea lice at a nearby salmon farm which were 13 times the industry standard.

== Wildlife ==
Loch Ròg has a wide range of habitats and these are typical for sheltered sealoch systems. In the more exposed outer sites there are kelp forests dominated by Laminaria hyperborean while in the sheltered inner loch the kelp forest is dominated by Laminaria saccharina forest. Other habitats in the loch include cliff at the entrance where jewel anemones, plumose anemones and diverse turfs consisting of bryozoa and ascidia. These cliffs end in areas of coarse sandy sediments at depths of 30 metres (98 ft). The silted, rocky slopes in the inner areas of the loch support encrustations of algae and ascidians, giving way to more mixed muddier sediments in shallower waters.

Notable species recorded during underwater surveys of the loch include the holothurian Holothuria forskali, also known as the sea spinner, a species typical of more southerly British waters which occurs sporadically in western Scottish waters. Another interesting species recorded is the starfish Stichastrella rosea which is more typical of the northern British coastal waters and is infrequently recorded from exposed western coastal waters. Other wildlife which may be seen around the loch include red deer, grey seal, European otter, white-tailed eagle and grey heron. The brackish lagoon complex along the shores of Loch Ròg is a Special Area of Conservation.

== Islands ==
Loch Ròg contains a number of islands and these include Great Bernera and a number of uninhabited islands.
