= The Mezentian Gate =

1958 novel by E. R. Eddison

- Cover of the first edition.
- Author: E. R. Eddison
- Illustrator: Keith Henderson
- Language: English
- Series: Zimiamvian Trilogy
- Genre: Fantasy
- Publisher: Curwen Press
- Publication date: 1958
- Publication place: United Kingdom
- Media type: Print (Hardback)
- Pages: xxiv, 247
- Preceded by: The Worm Ouroboros
- Followed by: A Fish Dinner in Memison

The Mezentian Gate is a fantasy novel by English writer E. R. Eddison, the third in his Zimiamvian Trilogy. It is primarily a history of the rule of the fictional King Mezentius (the Tyrant of Fingiswold), and his methods of gaining and holding the Three Kingdoms of Fingiswold, Meszria and Rerek in sway.

Published posthumously, The Mezentian Gate is only partially completed as prose. In many of the central chapters, only the plot outline is presented. The first edition, published in 1958, comprised those chapters completed by Eddison, supplemented by an "Argument" summarizing the unfinished portions of the novel. An omnibus edition of the trilogy, published in 1992 as Zimiamvia, supplemented the 1958 text with unfinished draft texts for several never-completed chapters found among Eddison's manuscripts in the Bodleian Library. The expanded version was published in an independent edition by HarperCollins in 2014.

The Mezentian Gate is chronologically the first book in the Zimiamvian Trilogy.

== Sources ==
- "Library of Congress Online Catalog".
