= Mistress of Mistresses =

1935 novel by E. R. Eddison

- Dust-jacket for Mistress of Mistresses
- Author: E. R. Eddison
- Illustrator: Keith Henderson
- Language: English
- Series: Zimiamvian Trilogy
- Genre: Fantasy
- Publisher: Faber and Faber
- Publication date: 1935
- Publication place: United Kingdom
- Media type: Print (hardback)
- Pages: 463
- Preceded by: A Fish Dinner in Memison

Mistress of Mistresses is a fantasy novel by English writer E. R. Eddison, the first in his Zimiamvian Trilogy. First published in 1935, it centers on political intrigues between the nobles and rulers of the Three Kingdoms of Rerek, Meszria and Fingiswold, following the death of King Mezentius, an extraordinary ruler who has held sway over three kingdoms mainly through force of character. Dissolution of the realm seems certain as alliances are formed and begin to intrigue against each other. The character of Lessingham is an unknown quantity, with a strong character of his own, but the reader is kept uncertain over what impact Lessingham can have over the future of the realm until the novel's close.

First of the Zimiamvian Trilogy to be published, Mistress of Mistresses is chronologically the last novel in the series.

== Sources ==
- Bleiler, Everett (1948). The Checklist of Fantastic Literature. Chicago: Shasta Publishers. p. 107.
