= Keith Henderson =

Keith Henderson may refer to:

- Keith Henderson (American football)
- Keith Henderson (artist)
