= 'Usṭūra series =

Arabic-language high fantasy novels

The ʔusṭūra ("legend") series is an Arabic-language series of high fantasy novels by Islām Idrīs (إسلام إدريس). As of 2023, the novels were أسطورة العودة (ʔusṭūrat al-ʕawda, "the legend of return"), أسطورة الكاهن (ʔusṭūrat al-kāhin, "the legend of the Priest"), and أسطورة الرحيل (ʔusṭūrat al-raḥīl, "the legend of departure"). The trilogy was published in Kuwait in 2012–14 by Platinum. It has been seen as the first Arabic-language fantasy work in the Anglo-American tradition of fantasy such as The Lord of the Rings (from which it borrows such character-names as Arwen, Haldir, and Galadriel) and Game of Thrones.

== Setting and style ==
The novels are set on a fantasy island-continent named Ethera. At the beginning of the series, Ethera is inhabited by humans (whose society is organised into various kingdoms, empires, cities, and so forth), Mawrizurs (elf-like people who have magic powers derived from the Earth and who serve Nature, communicating telepathically with their magical horses), and al-Fursan al-Jawāla (translated by Noura Al Noman as "Mounted Rangers" and by Nardeen Dow as "Wandering Knights", who also have magical powers and who have cut their ties with humans several generations prior to the story).

Ethera's civilisation is threatened by the Nazīl, ogre-like barbarians whom humans and al-Fursan al-Jawāla once sought to annihilate. Humans' contest with the Nazīl is presented in the books as a struggle between good and evil.

Ethera is neighboured by Micora, another island, inhabited by dwarves. The world also features dragons, mermaids, gods, and pirates.

According to Nardeen Dow, "similar to Game of Thrones, the book does not revolve around a hero figure; instead, readers are presented with various figures as main characters. On occasions, one of the main characters dies, and the reader starts to follow the story of another."

== Summary ==
=== أسطورة العودة ("the legend of return") ===
In the summary of Dow,

The first book begins with rumors of the imminent attack of the Nazeels on human settlements. These rumors travel fast to the court of kings in the capitals of kingdoms and empires, and everyone hears of the impending attack and speculates about the fate of mankind in the next war. However, the Nazeels [...] fail in the attempt because of the union between the Wandering Knights and the men. The book further shows the interactions between the three peoples who live in Ethera.

=== أسطورة الكاهن ("the legend of the priest") ===
Dow summarises this novel thus:

The Priest is the moving power of the Nazeels, urging them to attack humans. Nothing stands in the way of the Nazeels, who are taking revenge on the men and the knights who stood in the way of their previous attempts to conquer. These battles cause the destruction of human cities and the slaughter of their inhabitants and their fighters. However, the knights have a different plan that adheres to an ancient prophecy. The prophecy predicts that this desperate war will not be victorious except by the forces of evil, and that the knights must return to their ancient land where a hero will appear who will lead them to victory in the future.

=== أسطورة الرحيل ("the legend of departure") ===
According to Dow,

Here, the readers are introduced more in-depth to the Black Priest and the Nazeels, among others, and to the essence of the war between the various groups. The Moziro, the dwarfs, and the mermaids get involved in the war as well, and each of these groups has an agenda. The focus of the third book is Micora, the dwarf Island. The book also ends with several battles, all of which result in the defeat of humans, and it seems that there is no hope to confront the forces of the Black Priest who also uses giants, dwarfs, the Morizors, the Knights, and traitors among the human race.

== Reception ==
In the assessment of Noura Al Noman,

The story is timeless [...] Readers who were never exposed to fantasy epics like Lord of the Rings will be fascinated by the detailed settings, clothes, and weapons. The combat scenes are described in detail, as if they were being played out on a screen. Furthermore, to create a series of books means the readers will be asking for more, and that is the greatest gift to Arabic literature. There is no single protagonist in the story to place all of our hopes on; there are many characters from the various races. This has resulted in two-dimensional, stereotypical characters, and I personally couldn’t empathize with any of them. But for a young adult who has little to no fantasy to read, I think this is a great series of books.
