= The Art of Nijinsky =

1913 book by Geoffrey Whitworth

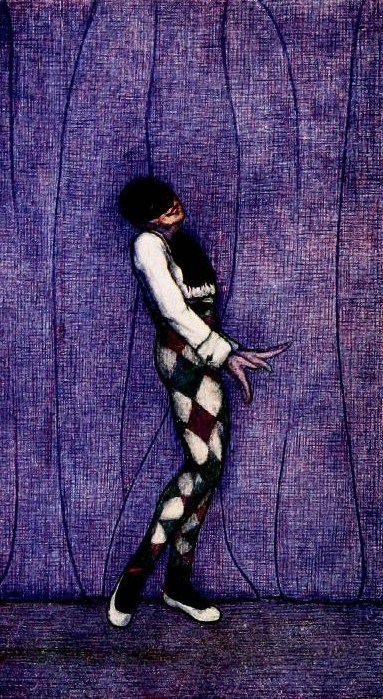
- Frontispiece of a 1913 publication.
- Author: Geoffrey Whitworth
- Illustrator: Dorothy Mullock
- Language: English
- Publisher: Chatto & Windus
- Publication date: 1913
- Publication place: United Kingdom
- Pages: 110
- OCLC: 504207393
- Text: The Art of Nijinsky at Wikisource

The Art of Nijinsky is a 1913 book written by Geoffrey Whitworth which analyzes the art of Vaslav Nijinsky. At 110 pages, it features 10 colored illustrations by Dorothy Mullock,

The watercolor illustrations by Mullock, have been called "remarkable." The text, itself called "enthusiastic," examines the career of Nijinsky in both the art-form and choreography, as well as appreciating Nijinsky's achievements. It also touches on the history of Russian ballet and related literature. In 1914, The Art of Nijinsky sold for $1.10, and it is considered to be the "first book to appear in appreciation of his art." However, Edward Gordon Craig felt that the book was unnecessary, stating that "the art of Nijinsky is no art."

== Sources ==
- The Bookman. Vol. 45. Hodder and Stoughton. 1914.
- Kirstein, Lincoln (1984). Four centuries of ballet: fifty masterworks. Courier Dover Publications. ISBN 978-0-486-24631-4.
- Gordon Craig, Edward (1978). Gordon Craig on movement and dance. Dance Books. ISBN 978-0-903102-37-7.
- The Art of Nijinsky. Vol. 25. Condé Nast Publications. 1914.
- Los Angeles Public Library (1914). Library books: monthly bulletin of the Los Angeles Public Library. 9. Vol. 9. OCLC 9818762.
- Merritt Baker, Blanch. Dramatic Bibliography. New York. OCLC 486855122.
- The Nation. Vol. 98. Dublin: The Nation Company. 1914.
- Nicoll, Allardyce (2009). English Drama, 1900-1930: The Beginnings of the Modern Period. Jones & Bartlett Learning. ISBN 978-0-521-12947-3.
- Publishers' Association (1914). The Bookseller. Vol. 60. Booksellers Association of Great Britain and Ireland.
