= Fantasy literature =

Literature set in an imaginary universe

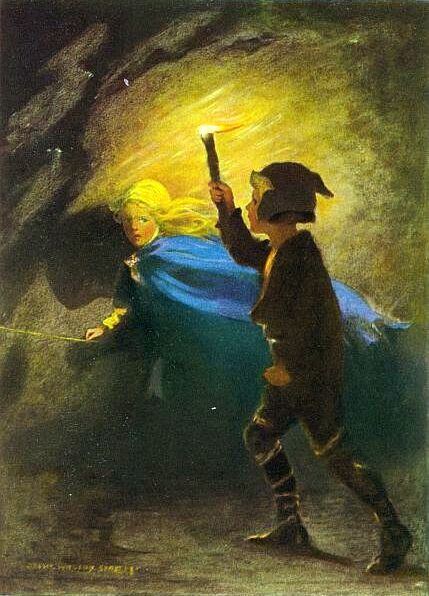
Illustration from 1920 edition of George MacDonald's novel The Princess and the Goblin

Fantasy literature is literature set in an imaginary universe, often but not always without any locations, events, or people from the real world. Magic, the supernatural and magical creatures are common in many of these imaginary worlds. Fantasy literature may be directed at both children and adults.

Fantasy is considered a genre of speculative fiction and is distinguished from the genres of science fiction and horror by the absence of scientific or macabre themes, respectively, though these may overlap. Historically, most works of fantasy were in written form, but since the 1960s, a growing segment of the genre has taken the form of fantasy films, fantasy television programs, graphic novels, video games, music and art.

Many fantasy novels originally written for children and adolescents also attract an adult audience. Examples include Alice's Adventures in Wonderland, the Harry Potter series, The Chronicles of Narnia, and The Hobbit.

== History ==
=== Beginnings ===
Stories involving magic and terrible monsters have existed in spoken forms before the advent of printed literature. Classical mythology is replete with fantastical stories and characters, the best known (and perhaps the most relevant to modern fantasy) being the works of Homer (Greek) and Virgil (Roman).

The philosophy of Plato has had great influence on the fantasy genre. In the Christian Platonic tradition, the reality of other worlds, and an overarching structure of great metaphysical and moral importance, has lent substance to the fantasy worlds of modern works.

With Empedocles (c. 490 – c. 430 BC), elements are often used in fantasy works as personifications of the forces of nature.

India has a long tradition of fantastical stories and characters, dating back to Vedic mythology. The Panchatantra (Fables of Bidpai), which some scholars believe was composed around the 3rd century BC. It is based on older oral traditions, including "animal fables that are as old as we are able to imagine".

It was influential in Europe and the Middle East. It used various animal fables and magical tales to illustrate the central Indian principles of political science. Talking animals endowed with human qualities have now become a staple of modern fantasy.

The Baital Pachisi (Vikram and the Vampire), a collection of various fantasy tales set within a frame story is, according to Richard Francis Burton and Isabel Burton, "the germ which culminated in the Arabian Nights, and which also inspired the Golden Ass of Apuleius, (2nd century A.D). Boccaccio's Decamerone (c.1353) the Pentamerone (1634, 1636) and all that class of facetious fictitious literature."

The Book of One Thousand and One Nights (Arabian Nights) from the Middle East has been influential in the West since it was translated from the Arabic into French in 1704 by Antoine Galland. Many imitations were written, especially in France.

The Fornaldarsagas, Norse and Icelandic sagas, both of which are based on ancient oral tradition influenced the German Romantics, as well as William Morris, and J. R. R. Tolkien. The Anglo-Saxon epic poem Beowulf has also had deep influence on the fantasy genre; although it was unknown for centuries and so not developed in medieval legend and romance, several fantasy works have retold the tale, such as John Gardner's Grendel.

Celtic folklore and legend has been an inspiration for many fantasy works.

The Welsh tradition has been particularly influential, owing to its connection to King Arthur and its collection in a single work, the epic Mabinogion. One influential retelling of this was the fantasy work of Evangeline Walton. The Irish Ulster Cycle and Fenian Cycle have also been plentifully mined for fantasy. Its greatest influence was, however, indirect. Celtic folklore and mythology provided a major source for the Arthurian cycle of chivalric romance: the Matter of Britain. Although the subject matter was heavily reworked by the authors, these romances developed marvels until they became independent of the original folklore and fictional, an important stage in the development of fantasy.

=== From the 13th century ===
Romance or chivalric romance is a type of prose and verse narrative that reworked legends, fairy tales, and history to suit the readers' and hearers' tastes, but by c. 1600 they were out of fashion, and Miguel de Cervantes famously burlesqued them in his novel Don Quixote. Still, the modern image of "medieval" is more influenced by the romance than by any other medieval genre, and the word medieval evokes knights, distressed damsels, dragons, and other romantic tropes.

=== Renaissance ===
At the time of the Renaissance romance continued to be popular, and the trend was to more fantastic fiction. The English Le Morte d'Arthur by Sir Thomas Malory (c.1408–1471) was written in prose, and the work dominates the Arthurian literature. Arthurian motifs have appeared steadily in literature from its publication, though the works have been a mix of fantasy and non-fantasy works. At the time, it and the Spanish Amadis de Gaula (1508), which was also written in prose, spawned many imitators, and the genre was popularly well-received. It later produced such masterpieces of Renaissance poetry as Ludovico Ariosto's Orlando furioso and Torquato Tasso's Gerusalemme Liberata. Ariosto's tale in particular was a source text for many fantasies of adventure.

During the Renaissance, Giovanni Francesco Straparola wrote and published The Facetious Nights of Straparola (1550–1555), a collection of stories of which many are literary fairy tales. Giambattista Basile wrote and published the Pentamerone, which was the first collection of stories to contain solely what would later be known as fairy tales. The two works include the oldest recorded form of many well-known (and some more obscure) European fairy tales. This was the beginning of a tradition that would both influence the fantasy genre and be incorporated in it, as many works of fairytale fantasy appear to this day.

In a work on alchemy in the 16th century, Paracelsus (1493–1541) identified four types of beings with the four elements of alchemy: gnomes (earth elementals); undines (water); sylphs (air); and salamanders (fire). Most of these beings are found in folklore as well as alchemy, and their names are often used interchangeably with similar beings from folklore.

=== Enlightenment ===
Literary fairy tales, such as those written by Charles Perrault (1628–1703) and Madame d'Aulnoy (c.1650 – 1705), became very popular early in the Age of Enlightenment. Many of Perrault's tales became fairy tale staples and were influential to later fantasy. When d'Aulnoy termed her works contes de fée (fairy tales), she invented the term that is now generally used for the genre, thus distinguishing such tales from those involving no marvels. This approach influenced later writers who took up the folk fairy tales in the same manner during the Romantic era.

Several fantasies aimed at an adult readership were also published in 18th century France, including Voltaire's "contes philosophique" The Princess of Babylon (1768) and The White Bull (1774). This era, however, was notably hostile to fantasy. Writers of the new types of fiction such as Defoe, Richardson, and Fielding were realistic in style, and many early realistic works were critical of fantastical elements in fiction.

However, in the Elizabethan era in England, fantasy literature became extraordinarily popular and fueled populist and anti-authoritarian sentiment during the 1590s. Topics that were written about included "fairylands in which the sexes traded places [and] men and immortals mingl[ing]".

=== Romanticism ===
Romanticism, a movement of the late eighteenth and early nineteenth century, was a dramatic reaction to rationalism, challenging the priority of reason and promoting the importance of imagination and spirituality. Its success in rehabilitating imagination was of fundamental importance to the evolution of fantasy, and its interest in medieval romances provided many motifs to modern fantasy.

The Romantics invoked the medieval romance as a model for the works they wanted to produce, in contrast to the realism of the Enlightenment. One of the first literary results of this trend was the Gothic novel, a genre that began in Britain with The Castle of Otranto (1764) by Horace Walpole. That work is considered the predecessor to both modern fantasy and modern horror fiction. Another noted Gothic novel which also contains a large amount of Arabian Nights-influenced fantasy elements is Vathek (1786) by William Thomas Beckford.

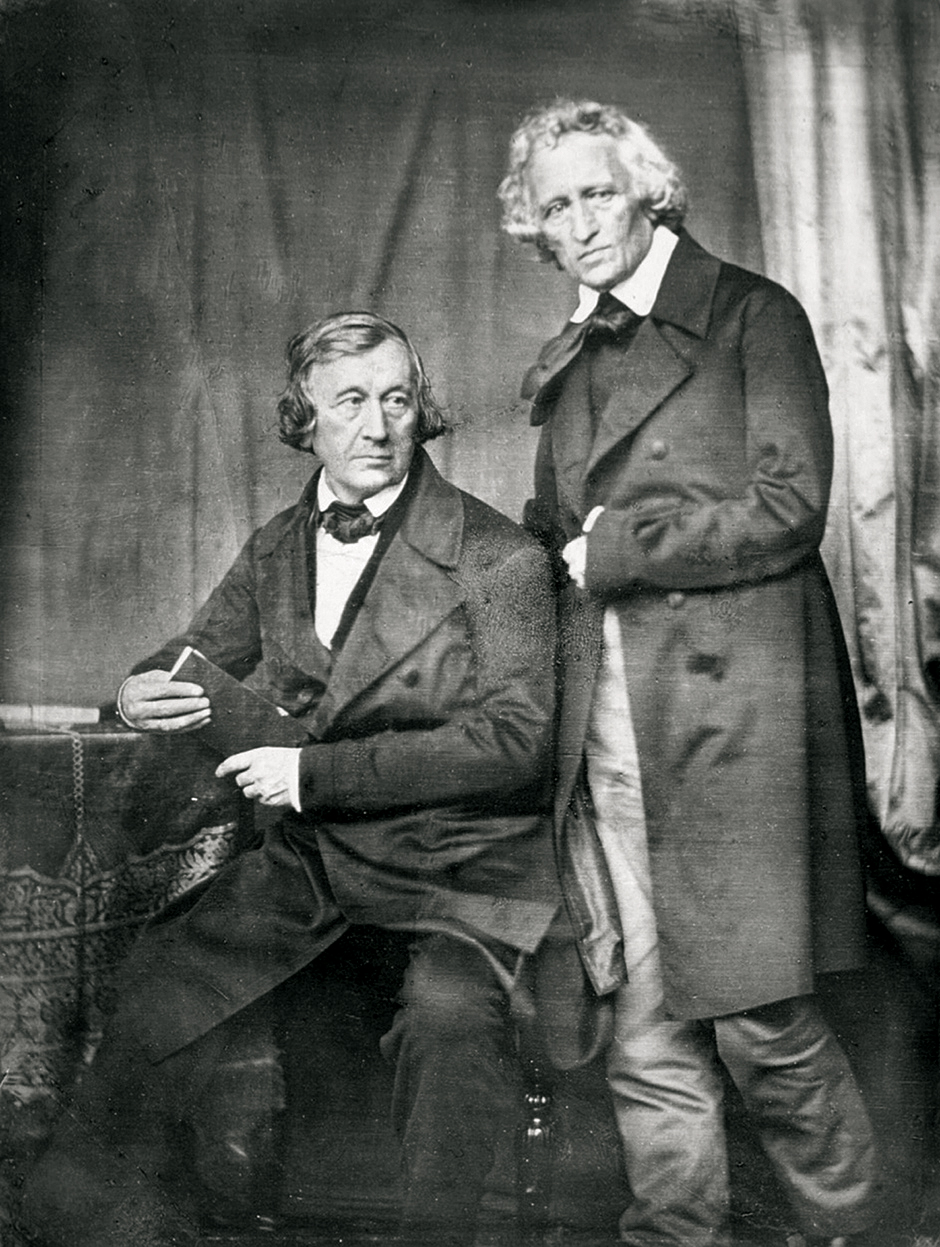
The Grimm brothers.

In the later part of the Romantic period, folklorists collected folktales, epic poems, and ballads, and released them in printed form. The Brothers Grimm were inspired by the movement of German Romanticism in their 1812 collection Grimm's Fairy Tales, and they in turn inspired other collectors. Frequently their motivation stemmed not merely from Romanticism, but from Romantic nationalism, in that many were inspired to save their own country's folklore. Sometimes, as in the Kalevala, they compiled existing folklore into an epic to match other nation's, and sometimes, as in The Poems of Ossian, they fabricated folklore that should have been there. These works, whether fairy tale, ballads, or folk epics, were a major source for later fantasy works.

The Romantic interest in medievalism also resulted in a revival of interest in the literary fairy tale. The tradition begun with Giovanni Francesco Straparola and Giambattista Basile and developed by Charles Perrault and the French précieuses was taken up by the German Romantic movement. The German author Friedrich de la Motte Fouqué created medieval-set stories such as Undine (1811), The Magic Ring (1812) and Sintram and his Companions (1815), which would later inspire British writers such as George MacDonald and William Morris. E.T.A. Hoffmann's tales, such as The Golden Pot (1814) and The Nutcracker and the Mouse King (1816) were notable additions to the canon of German fantasy. Ludwig Tieck's collection Phantasus (1812–1817) contained several short fairy tales, including "The Elves".

In France, the main writers of Romantic-era fantasy were Charles Nodier with Smarra (1821) and Trilby (1822) and Théophile Gautier who penned such stories as "Omphale" (1834) and "One of Cleopatra's Nights" (1838) as well as the novel Spirite (1866).

=== Victorian era ===
Fantasy literature was popular in Victorian times, with the works of writers such as Mary Shelley, William Morris, George MacDonald, and Charles Dodgson reaching wider audiences.

Hans Christian Andersen took a new approach to fairy tales by creating original stories told in a serious fashion. From this origin, John Ruskin wrote The King of the Golden River (1851), a fairy tale that included complex levels of characterization and created in the Southwest Wind an irascible but kindly character similar to J.R.R. Tolkien's later Gandalf.

The history of modern fantasy literature began with George MacDonald, author of such novels as The Princess and the Goblin (1868) and Phantastes (1868), the latter of which is widely considered to be the first fantasy novel written for adults. MacDonald also wrote one of the first critical essays about the fantasy genre, "The Fantastic Imagination", in his book A Dish of Orts (1893). MacDonald was a major influence on both Tolkien and C. S. Lewis.

The other major fantasy author of this era was William Morris, an admirer of the Middle Ages and a poet who wrote several fantastic romances and novels in the latter part of the 19th century, including The Well at the World's End (1896). Morris was inspired by the medieval sagas, and his writing was deliberately archaic in the style of the chivalric romances. Morris's work represented an important milestone in the history of fantasy, as while other writers wrote of foreign lands or of dream worlds, Morris was the first to set his stories in an entirely invented world.

Authors such as Edgar Allan Poe and Oscar Wilde also contributed to the development of fantasy with their writing of horror stories. Wilde also wrote a large number of children's fantasies, collected in The Happy Prince and Other Stories (1888) and A House of Pomegranates (1891). H. Rider Haggard developed the conventions of the lost world subgenre with his novel King Solomon's Mines (1885), which presented a fantastical Africa to a European audience still unfamiliar with the continent. Other writers, including Edgar Rice Burroughs and Abraham Merritt, further developed the style.

Several classic children's fantasies such as Lewis Carroll's Alice's Adventures in Wonderland (1865), L. Frank Baum's The Wonderful Wizard of Oz (1900), as well as the work of E. Nesbit and Frank R. Stockton were also published around this time. C. S. Lewis noted that in the earlier part of the 20th century, fantasy was more accepted in juvenile literature, and therefore a writer interested in fantasy often wrote for that audience, despite using concepts and themes that could form a work aimed at adults.

At this time, the terminology for the genre was not settled. Many fantasies in this era were termed fairy tales, including Max Beerbohm's "The Happy Hypocrite" (1896) and MacDonald's Phantastes. It was not until 1923 that the term "fantasist" was used to describe a writer (in this case, Oscar Wilde) who wrote fantasy fiction. The name "fantasy" was not developed until later; as late as J.R.R. Tolkien's The Hobbit (1937), the term "fairy tale" was still being used.

=== After 1901 ===
An important factor in the development of the fantasy genre was the arrival of magazines devoted to fantasy fiction. The first such publication was the German magazine Der Orchideengarten which ran from 1919 to 1921. In 1923, the first English-language fantasy fiction magazine, Weird Tales, was created. Many other similar magazines eventually followed. and The Magazine of Fantasy & Science Fiction

H. P. Lovecraft was deeply influenced by Edgar Allan Poe and to a somewhat lesser extent, by Lord Dunsany; with his Cthulhu Mythos stories, he became one of the most influential writers of fantasy and horror in the 20th century.

Despite MacDonald's future influence, and Morris' popularity at the time, it was not until around the start of the 20th century that fantasy fiction began to reach a large audience, with authors such as Lord Dunsany (1878–1957) who, following Morris's example, wrote fantasy novels, but also in the short story form. He was particularly noted for his vivid and evocative style. His style greatly influenced many writers, not always happily; Ursula K. Le Guin, in her essay on style in fantasy "From Elfland to Poughkeepsie", wryly referred to Lord Dunsany as the "First Terrible Fate that Awaiteth Unwary Beginners in Fantasy", alluding to young writers attempting to write in Lord Dunsany's style. According to S. T. Joshi, "Dunsany's work had the effect of segregating fantasy—a mode whereby the author creates his own realm of pure imagination—from supernatural horror. From the foundations he established came the later work of E. R. Eddison, Mervyn Peake, and J. R. R. Tolkien.

In Britain in the aftermath of World War I, a notably large number of fantasy books aimed at an adult readership were published, including Living Alone (1919) by Stella Benson, A Voyage to Arcturus (1920) by David Lindsay, Lady into Fox (1922) by David Garnett, Lud-in-the-Mist (1926) by Hope Mirrlees, and Lolly Willowes (1926) by Sylvia Townsend Warner. E. R. Eddison was another influential writer who wrote during this era. He drew inspiration from Northern sagas, as Morris did, but his prose style was modeled more on Tudor and Elizabethan English, and his stories were filled with vigorous characters in glorious adventures. Eddison's most famous work is The Worm Ouroboros (1922), a long heroic fantasy set on an imaginary version of the planet Mercury.

Literary critics of the era began to take an interest in "fantasy" as a genre of writing, and also to argue that it was a genre worthy of serious consideration. Herbert Read devoted a chapter of his book English Prose Style (1928) to discussing "Fantasy" as an aspect of literature, arguing it was unjustly considered suitable only for children: "The Western World does not seem to have conceived the necessity of Fairy Tales for Grown-Ups".

In 1938, with the publication of The Sword in the Stone, T. H. White introduced one of the most notable works of comic fantasy.

The first major contribution to the genre after World War II was Mervyn Peake's Titus Groan (1946), the book that launched the Gormenghast series. J. R. R. Tolkien played a large role in the popularization and accessibility of the fantasy genre with his highly successful publications The Hobbit (1937) and The Lord of the Rings (1954–55). Tolkien was largely influenced by an ancient body of Anglo-Saxon myths, particularly Beowulf, as well as William Morris's romances and E. R. Eddison's 1922 novel, The Worm Ouroboros. Tolkien's close friend C. S. Lewis, author of The Chronicles of Narnia (1950–56) and a fellow English professor with a similar array of interests, also helped to publicize the fantasy genre. Tove Jansson, author of The Moomins, was also a strong contributor to the popularity of fantasy literature in the field of children and adults.

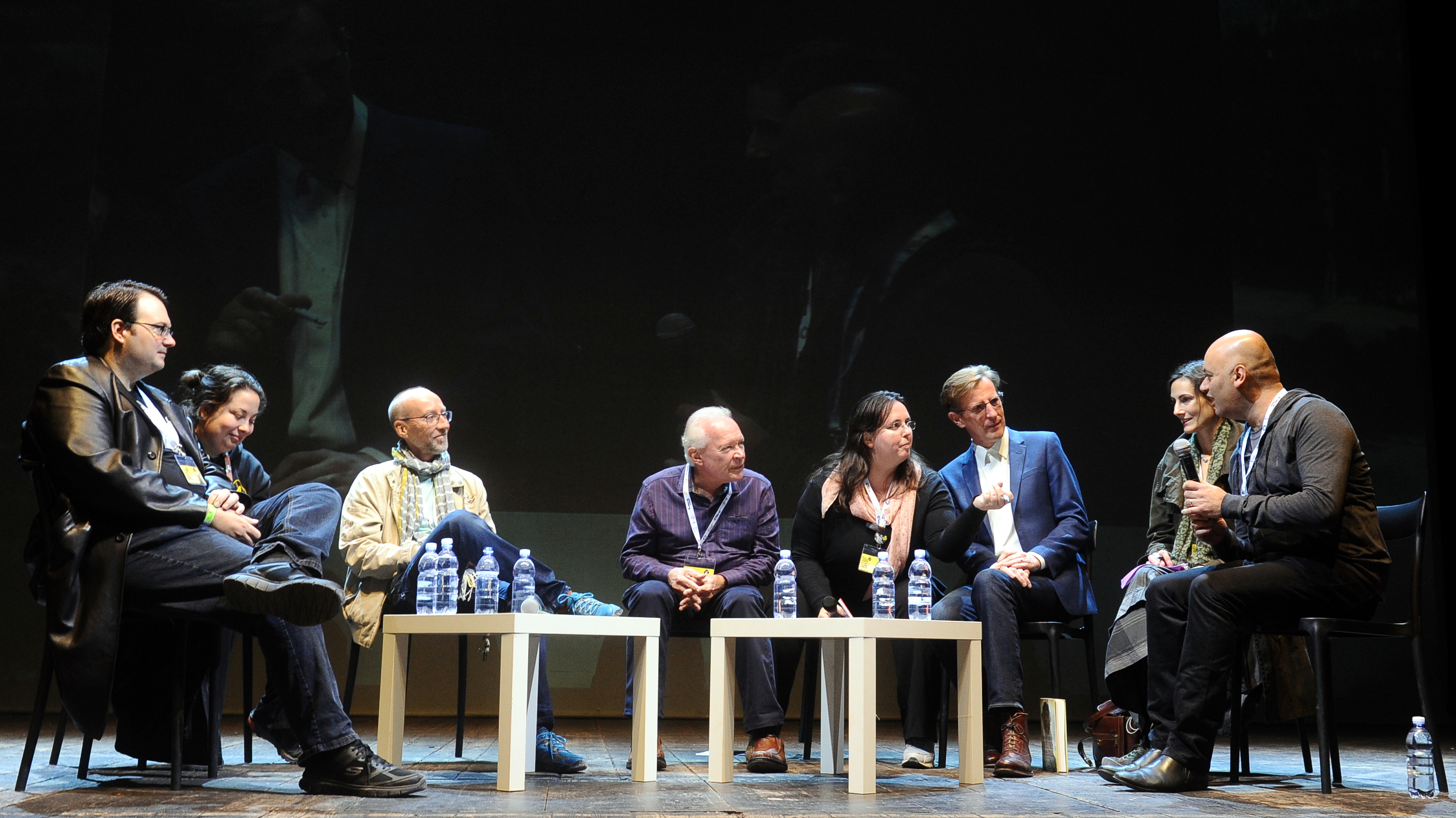
Fantasy writers Brandon Sanderson, Steven Erikson, Terry Brooks, Philip Reeve and Joshua Kahn at Lucca Comics & Games 2016

The tradition established by these predecessors of the late nineteenth and early twentieth centuries has continued to thrive and be adapted by new authors. The influence of J.R.R. Tolkien's fiction has—particularly over the genre of high fantasy—prompted a reaction.

In China, the idea of fantasy literature as a distinct genre first became prevalent in the early 21st century. China has long had pre-genre stories with fantastical elements, including zhiguai, ghost stories, and miracle tales, among others. Similarly, fantasy novels in the style of Anglophone fantasy emerged in Arabic literature in the 2010s, beginning with Islām Idrīs's ʔusṭūra ("legend") series.

It is not uncommon for fantasy novels to be ranked on The New York Times Best Seller list, and some have been at number one on the list, including most recently, Brandon Sanderson in 2014, Neil Gaiman in 2013, Patrick Rothfuss and George R. R. Martin in 2011, and Terry Goodkind in 2006.

== Style ==
Symbolism often plays a significant role in fantasy literature, often through the use of archetypal figures inspired by earlier texts or folklore. Some argue that fantasy literature and its archetypes fulfill a function for individuals and society and the messages are continually updated for current societies.

Ursula K. Le Guin, in her essay "From Elfland to Poughkeepsie", presented the idea that language is the most crucial element of high fantasy, because it creates a sense of place. She analyzed the misuse of a formal, "olden-day" style, saying that it was a dangerous trap for fantasy writers because it was ridiculous when done wrong. She warns writers away from trying to base their style on that of masters such as Lord Dunsany and E. R. Eddison, emphasizing that language that is too bland or simplistic creates the impression that the fantasy setting is simply a modern world in disguise, and presents examples of clear, effective fantasy writing in brief excerpts from Tolkien and Evangeline Walton.

Michael Moorcock observed that many writers use archaic language for its sonority and to lend color to a lifeless story. Brian Peters writes that in various forms of fairytale fantasy, even the villain's language might be inappropriate if vulgar.

== See also ==
- Children's literature
- Fantastique
- List of fantasy novels
- Mythology

== Footnotes ==
=== Works cited ===
- Jacobs, Joseph (1888), The earliest English version of the Fables of Bidpai, London
- Ryder, Arthur W. (transl) (1925), The Panchatantra, University of Chicago Press, ISBN 81-7224-080-5
