= Keith Henderson (artist) =

Scottish painter (1883–1982)

Keith Henderson OBE RP RSW RWS ROI
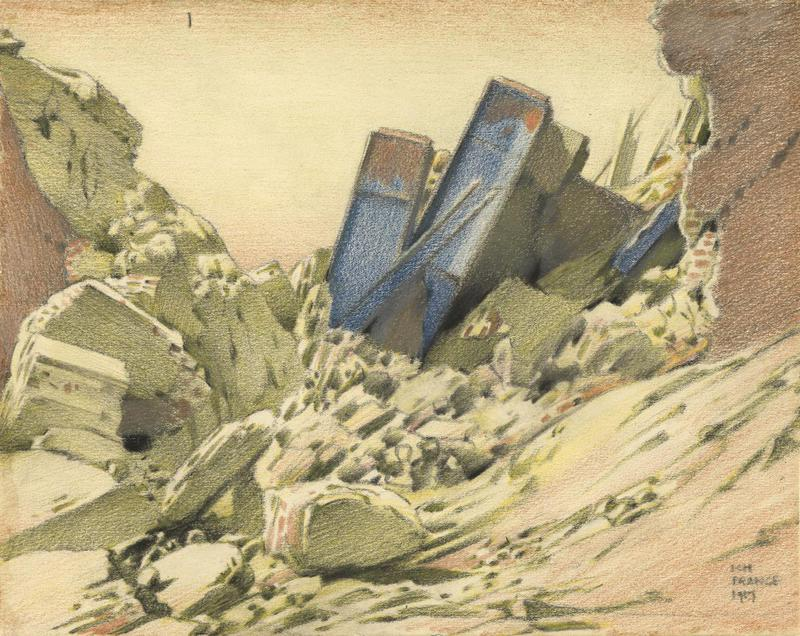
- A Wrecked Railway Bridge near the Hindenburg Line near Villers Guislain (1917) (Art IWM Art 246)
- Born: Alan Keith Henderson; 17 April 1883; Kensington, London, England
- Died: 24 February 1982 (aged 98); Elgin, South Africa
- Education: Marlborough College; Slade School of Art; Académie de la Grande Chaumière
- Known for: painting

Keith Henderson OBE RP RSW RWS ROI (17 April 1883 – 24 February 1982) was a Scottish painter who worked in both oils and watercolours, and who is known for his book illustrations and his poster work for London Transport and the Empire Marketing Board. He had a long professional career that included periods as a war artist in both the First World War, in which he served in the trenches, and in the Second World War.

== Early life and First World War ==
Henderson was born in Kensington, London and brought up in Aberdeenshire and in London. He was one of three children born to George MacDonald Henderson, a barrister at Lincoln's Inn, and Constance Helen, née Keith. He attended Orme Square School in London and Marlborough College. Henderson studied at the Slade School of Art before continuing to develop his art at the Académie de la Grande Chaumière in Paris. While in Paris he shared a studio with Maxwell Armfield. During the First World War Henderson served as a Captain with the Royal Wiltshire Yeomanry on the Western Front. He depicted his experiences of warfare there in several paintings and in a book, Letters to Helen: Impressions of an Artist on the Western Front, first published in 1917. 'Helen' was Helen Knox-Shaw, who Henderson married in 1917 at St Martin-in-the-Fields in London.

Between the two world wars Henderson travelled extensively in Africa and South America and would later include images of the flora and fauna he saw on these trips in his book illustrations. Henderson worked as an illustrator, designing posters and book jackets. He illustrated books by W. H. Hudson and E. R. Eddison, including The Worm Ouroboros, and, with Norman Wilkinson, an edition of Geoffrey Chaucer's translation of The Romaunt of the Rose. He produced poster designs for both London Transport and the Empire Marketing Board, who sent him to paint in Cyprus for over a year.

He also exhibited his work, at the Royal Academy and a solo show of paintings of Cyprus at the Beaux Arts Gallery at Bruton Place in London.

In August 1927, Henderson wrote a letter to The Times, giving his address as "Eoligarry, Isle of Barra, Outer Hebrides". He also lived at Glen Nevis and, from 1942, for several years at Spean Bridge. Henderson also worked in South Africa, Cyprus and Egypt.

== Second World War ==
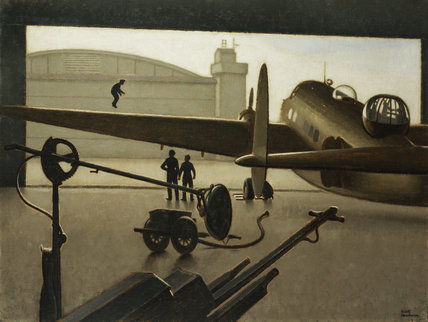
An Improvised Test of an Under-carriage by Keith Henderson

At the start of the Second World War, Henderson was one of the first two artists, alongside Paul Nash, appointed as a full-time salaried artist to the Air Ministry by the War Artists' Advisory Committee, WAAC. Henderson was sent to RAF bases in Scotland but was frustrated to find that William Rothenstein, although not contracted to WAAC at the time, had already visited many of the same bases and made many of the portrait drawings Henderson was due to paint. This led Henderson to concentrate on ground crew, aircraft hangars, repair shops and runways. Although the painting An Improvised Test of an Under-carriage provoked fury in the Air Ministry and contributed to Henderson's six-month contract not being extended, it was among the artworks shown at the first WAAC Britain at War exhibition at the Museum of Modern Art in New York in May 1941. The painting shows a man jumping up and down on the wing of a Lockheed Hudson to test the undercarriage.

Although disappointed his appointment had not been extended, Henderson continued to paint war subjects. Among these paintings was Loading Gantry for Pluto, which shows the giant gantry at W. T. Glover and Co. used for preparing the pipelines to be laid under the Channel to supply fuel to Allied forces in France.

== Later life ==
After the Second World War Henderson continued to paint, although his style changed somewhat. By the 1970s he was painting groups of figures in minimal settings, often against all-white backgrounds. His wife, Helen died in 1971 "after nearly sixty perfectly wonderful years together". After an interval of great heart searching he moved to London, having sold their Scottish home and his complete collection of pictures and books. During the last twenty years of his life, Henderson engraved over sixty illustrations for a book on Assyrian, Egyptian and Greek mythology which he titled Creatures and Personages, but which remained unpublished at the time of his death.

Henderson was the subject of a solo exhibition at the Palter/ Sands Gallery in Bristol in 1980. He was an active member, and major benefactor, of the Royal Watercolour Society until his death in 1982 in Elgin, South Africa. Works by Henderson are held in numerous Scottish collections, as well as the Imperial War Museum, the RAF Museum and the National Gallery of Canada.

== Bibliography ==
All entries are illustrated by Keith Henderson, the first five with colour plates, the remainder with pen-and-ink drawings or engravings in black-and-white, unless otherwise stated.

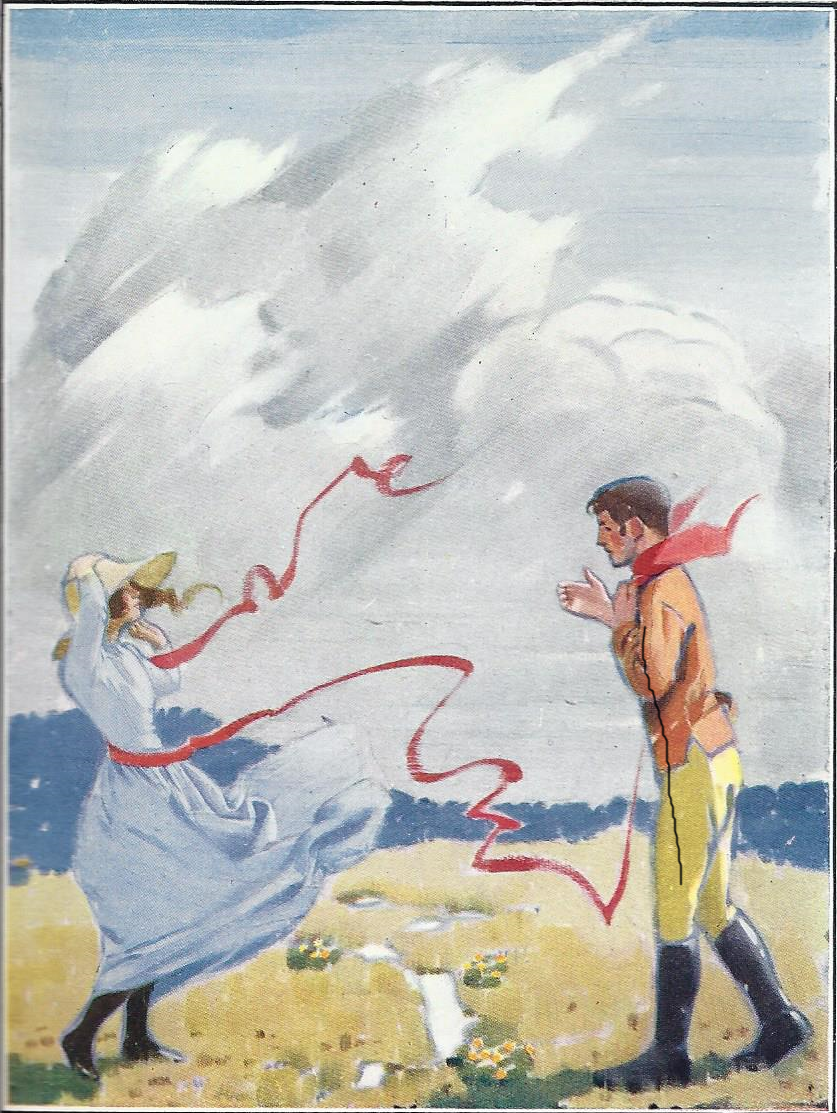
Under the Greenwood Tree:Another Meeting

- 1908 The Romaunt of the Rose rendered out of French (of G. de Lorris) into English by Geoffrey Chaucer, illustrated by Keith Henderson and Norman Wilkinson (Chatto & Windus for the Florence Press) 20 watercolour illustrations (10 by each artist) tipped in, with tissue guards, the captions in red; Limited Edition of 500 copies on hand-made Aldwych paper and 12 copies on vellum. Paper copies: Blue paper boards with white linen spine, white paper title label with black lettering on spine and cover, top edge gilt. Vellum copies: Soft white vellum binding with ribbon ties, upper-cover & spine lettered in gilt, silk headband, t.e.g., others untrimmed, 104pp, 4to.
- 1909 A Book of Whimsies by Geoffrey Whitworth and Keith Henderson (J.M. Dent) 12 coloured plates by Henderson; vignette title in blue and black, frontispiece with tissue guard; white cloth with an illustration on the upper cover, spine title in gilt, t.e.g., others untrimmed, 62pp Royal 8vo.
- 1910-1911 The Open Window Vol. 1 October to March 1910 – 1911 : Vol. 2 April to September 1911 (Locke Ellis) Cream card boards tied with blue ribbon tapes, gilt lettering, top edge gilt others uncut, 376pp / 359pp. Vol 1 Zoo poem by Henderson, 1 b & w line illustration; On the Okapi essay by Henderson, 1 b & w drawing; The Qualm play by Henderson & G Whitworth. Vol 2: monochrome illustration by Henderson; 1 b & w drawing. Also issued in monthly parts: blue printed wraps, beige spine, 12mo.
- 1913 Under the Greenwood Tree: A Rural Painting of the Dutch School by Thomas Hardy (Chatto & Windus) 10 coloured plates; title in green and black, green buckram gilt, illustration in gilt on upper-cover, edges untrimmed, 271pp, d/w, Royal 8vo.
- 1917 Letters to Helen: Impressions of an Artist on the Western Front by Keith Henderson). (Chatto & Windus) 12 coloured plates with tissue guards, captions in red; cloth-backed boards, paper title label on spine, 111pp + 7pp Chatto catalogue, d/w, 8vo.
- 1921 Catalogue of a Collection of Mexican and other American Antiquities (including the Chavero Collection) in the possession of Viscount Cowdray edited by Thomas Athol Joyce. Several black and white illustrations by Henderson. Green card covers, untrimmed, 78pp + 18pp blank, folding map, 4to, nd.
- 1922 The Conquest of Mexico by W.H. Prescott (Chatto & Windus). Volume 1: approx. 200 illustrations, Volume 2: 33 illustrations; Preface and Notes by the artist; pictorial titles and maps on the end papers; red cloth gilt, upper-covers with illustration in gilt, t.e.g. others untrimmed, 480pp/485pp, 8vo.
- 1922 The Worm Ouroboros: A Romance by E.R. Eddison (Jonathan Cape) six full page illustrations & Hippogriff design in gilt on the upper-cover, end-paper decorations; vignette title in red & black; black cloth gilt, 446pp, d/w, 8vo.
- 1924 Palm Groves and Hummingbirds: An Artist's Fortnight in Brazil by Keith Henderson (Ernest Benn) 7 plates of portraits & 54 other illustrations, pictorial title, maps on end-papers; (a) Limited Edition of 20 numbered copies printed on English hand-made paper signed by the author and bound in brown pigskin, spine lettering in gilt, t.e.g. others untrimmed; (b) Trade issue in green buckram gilt; 133pp, d/w, Royal 8vo.
- 1926 Green Mansions: A Romance of the Tropical Forest by W.H. Hudson (Duckworth) 35 illustrations some double-page; (a) Limited Edition of 165 copies on hand-made paper, numbered & signed by the artist, green buckram backed batik boards, patterned in gilt, olivine head; (b) Trade issue in green buckram, spine title in gilt 325pp, d/w, Royal 8vo. (Binding variants).
- 1926 Styrbiorn the Strong by E.R. Eddison (Jonathan Cape) vignette title, end papers & textual decorations, with a gilt motif on the upper-cover; black cloth gilt, edges untrimmed, 248pp, d/w, 8vo.
- 1927 Prehistoric Man by Keith Henderson (Chatto & Windus) coloured frontispiece with tissue guard, 101 other illustrations; green cloth gilt with an illustration in blind on the upper-cover, 276pp, d/w, 8vo
- 1929 The Purple Land by W.H. Hudson (Duckworth) 13 full-page portraits & 39 other illustrations; (a) Limited Edition of 165 copies on hand-made paper, numbered & signed by the artist, purple cloth-backed batik boards, gilt, mauve head, edges untrimmed; (b) Trade issue in similar format, 368 pp, d/w, Royal 8vo. (Binding variants).
- 1933 No Second Spring by Janet Beith (Hodder & Stoughton) 7 illustrations & other decorations; black cloth with olivine head, 304pp, d/w, 8vo.
- 1934 Buckaroo by Eugene Cunningham (Hodder & Stoughton) 18 illustrations & decorations, pictorial title, pistol motif on covers; black cloth with rouge head, 319pp, d/w, 8vo.
- 1935 Mistress of Mistresses: A Vision of Zimiamvia by E.R. Eddison (Faber) pictorial title, dedication and other decorations (the maps of the three Kingdoms are by Gerald Hayes); blue cloth with a decoration in gilt on the upper-cover, spine title in gilt blocked in red, rouge head, 463pp, d/w, 8vo.
- 1936 Christina Strang by Alison Fleming (pseud. Lucy M Cummings) (Hodder & Stoughton) 4 portraits and other decorations, blue cloth, title blocked in yellow, 318pp, d/w, 8vo.
- 1936 Sand Castle by Janet Beith (Hodder & Stoughton) 7 full-page illustrations & other decorations; black cloth, 432pp, d/w, 8vo.
- 1938 Burns – By Himself: The Poet-Ploughman's Life in his own words – pieced together from his Diaries, Letters, & Poems . . . . arbitrarily arranged to form a continuous story by Keith Henderson (Methuen) 68 illustrations; orange cloth with a silhouette cameo on the spine, 259pp, d/w, Royal 8vo.
- 1949 Highland Pack by Neil M Gunn (Faber) 53 illustrations; red cloth gilt, rouge head, 274pp, d/w, 8vo.
- 1952 Pastels by Keith Henderson (Studio Publications) Coloured and monochrome plates, two by the author with frontispiece & title illustrations; How to Do it Series No.43, grey boards, 96pp, 8vo.
- 1958 Scotland Before History: An essay by Stuart Piggott (Thomas Nelson) 32 illustrations, red cloth gilt, rouge head, 112pp, d/w, 8vo.
- 1958 The Mezentian Gate by E.R. Eddison (Privately published) frontispiece engraved by Henderson after a portrait by El Greco, end-paper designs & other decorations; a limited number of copies printed at the Curwen Press; green buckram gilt, 247pp, d/w, 8vo.
- 1970 Till 21: A Victorian Artist's Autobiography by Keith Henderson (Regency Press) photographs and early illustrations; purple end-papers, black boards gilt, 185pp, d/w, 8vo.
- 1971 The Labyrinth (Poems) by Keith Henderson (Privately printed) unillustrated; card covers printed in red & black, 39pp, 8vo.

== Other works and illustrations ==
- 1904 Illustrations for the second edition of The Purple Land, Duckworth Books, by William H. Hudson.
- 1909 Catalogue of an exhibition of "Whimsey Pictures" and pictures of Antrim and Donegal by Keith Henderson : London : Baillie Gallery.
- 1910 The Revolt of Woman and Other Poems by Vivian Locke Ellis (Locke Ellis), frontispiece by Keith Henderson. Cream cloth lettered red on spine and cover, ruled border in red, 62pp, sm 8vo.
- 1918 The War Depicted by Distinguished British Artists (The Studio) 8 colour plates, others in b & w, 1 by Henderson, brown cloth lettered in gilt, top edge gilt, 98pp, 4to.
- 1919 The Late Lieut. Nickalls From a Drawing by Keith Henderson (The Studio Vol 78 No. 321) monochrome illustration by Henderson.
- 1925 Keith Henderson by Geoffrey Whitworth (The Studio Vol 90 No. 388) 6 portraits by Henderson, 2 full page, one of which is coloured; card covers, 8vo.
- 1927 Times Literary Supplement - Printing Number. 13 October 1927. Full-page illustration by Henderson taken from W.H. Prescott Conquest of Mexico 1922. White cloth cover, spine label lettered gilt on brown, 64pp, large 4to.
- 1930 Vision- Number 2: The Magazine of the Gloucester Society of Artists, three line drawings by Henderson (taken from The Purple Land), blue card covers, 37pp, stapled.
- 1930 The Crusades: Iron Men and Saints by Harold Lamb (Doubleday, Doran and Company) coloured dust wrapper by Henderson, black cloth pictorially stamped in gilt, spine lettering gilt, 368pp, d/w, large 8vo.
- 1934 Catalogue of an Exhibition of Cotswold Art and Craftsmanship Preface by William Rothenstein (The Alcuin Press Gallery, Chipping Campden) paper covers with engraving to upper wrapper, stapled. No illustrations but two priced entries, of a pastel and a watercolour, for sale by Henderson.
- 1934 The Heart of Scotland by George Blake (Batsford) coloured frontispiece illustration by Henderson; (photographs by various hands; other illustrations by Brian Cook) purple cloth with title and author in green on upper-cover and spine, mauve head, 115pp + 32pp Batsford catalogue), d/w, 8vo.
- 1937 The Children's Art Book by Geoffrey Holme (The Studio) London. 25 mounted plates plus numerous b & w illustrations including three by Henderson, cloth backed illustrated boards, 96pp, dw, 8vo.
- 1938 The Good Work (The Tatler March 1938) Coloured double page illustration by Henderson.
- 1941 War-Time Notes of a Peaceful Artist (The Listener No. 637 27 March 1941) article and two monochrome illustrations by Henderson.
- 1941 Notes of a Peaceful Artist in War Time (The Listener No. 666 16 October 1941) article and single monochrome illustration by Henderson.
- 1942 War Pictures by British Artists – No. 3 R.A.F. with an introduction by H. E. Bates (Oxford University Press) b & w illustrations by several artists including 4 by Henderson; paperback, 64pp, d/w, 8vo.
- 1949 Glencoe and Dalness: Illustrated Guide Book (The National Trust for Scotland) cover design by Henderson, photographs and illustrations by others, card covers, 64pp, stapled small folio.
- 1952 Recording Scotland edited with notes by James B Salmond (Oliver and Boyd for The Pilgrim Trust) Coloured and monochrome plates, three by Henderson, red cloth, spine title in gilt, rouge head, 168pp, d/w, 4to.
- 1956 In Praise of Water-Colour article by Henderson (The Old Water-Colour Society's Club vol 31) coloured and monochrome plates, none by Henderson, white cloth backed boards, spine title in gilt, 32pp, 4to.
- 1975 The Artist and the Book: Conversations with Keith Henderson by Keith Nicholson (ABMR Vol II no 11 issue 21) 5 illustrations including 3 double page/page-and-a-half illustrations (from the unpublished book Creatures and Personages by Keith Henderson), card covers, 11pp within magazine, stapled folio.
