= Noura al Noman =

UAE science fiction writer

Noura al Noman (Arabic: نورةأحمدالنومان) is a science fiction writer from the United Arab Emirates (UAE).

== Early life ==
Al Noman studied English at UAE University and received a master's degree in translation from the American University of Sharjah. She represented the UAE in the 2013 Abu Dhabi International Book Fair.

== Novels ==
Her first novel, Ajwan, was published in 2012 and won the Best YA Book Award of the Etisalat Children's Books Award in 2013. Al Noman said that she wrote the novel because she was unable to find young adult science fiction in Arabic for her daughter to read, noting that both teenage fiction and science fiction were virtually non-existent in Arabic.

The novel follows the titular heroine, a 19-old girl, on an interplanetary quest to rescue her infant son from a nefarious organization who wants to turn him into a super-soldier. According to al Noman, the plot reflects contemporary political concerns in Arabic countries, in that it describes "men who have a hidden agenda to acquire power, and they use the pain and suffering of minorities or marginalised peoples to turn them into their own private armies".

A sequel to Ajwan, Mandaan, was published in 2014. More sequels are planned.

== Works ==
- Qutta Qutna (Cotton the Kitten), children's illustrated book, 2010, Kalimat
- Kunfuth Kiwi (Kiwi the Hedgehog), children's illustrated book, 2010, Kalimat
- أجوان (Ajwan), novel, 2012, Nahdet Misr, ISBN 9789771445395
- ماندان (Mandaan), novel, 2014, Nahdet Misr, ISBN 9789771447122
