= High fantasy =

Subgenre of fiction

High fantasy, or epic fantasy, is a subgenre of fantasy defined by the epic nature of its setting or by the epic stature of its characters, themes, or plot. High fantasy is usually set in an alternative, fictional ("secondary") world, rather than the "real" or "primary" world. This secondary world is usually internally consistent, and often quite developed, but its rules differ from those of the primary world. By contrast, low fantasy is characterized by being set on Earth, the rational primary or "real world", upon which the non-rational supernatural or fantasy elements intrude.

== Characteristics ==
The term "high fantasy" was coined by Lloyd Alexander in a 1971 essay, "High Fantasy and Heroic Romance", which was originally given at the New England Round Table of Children's Librarians in October 1969. In this definition, Alexander was using the framework Northrop Frye set forth in his Anatomy of Criticism, particularly Frye's Theory of Modes; High Fantasy being fantasy in the High Mimetic Mode. Since then, "high fantasy" has come to serve as a broad term to include a number of different flavors of the fantasy genre, mythic fantasy, dark fantasy, and wuxia. It typically is not considered to include the sword and sorcery genre. High fantasy is typically set in a quasi-medieval world, is frequently inspired by various mythological or legendary traditions, and often but not always features supernatural sorcery and imaginary beasts and beings such as dragons.

Many high fantasy stories are told from the viewpoint of one main hero. Often, much of the plot revolves around their heritage or mysterious nature, along with a world-threatening problem. In many novels the hero is an orphan or unusual sibling, and frequently portrayed with an extraordinary talent for magic or combat. They begin the story young, if not as an actual child, or are portrayed as being very weak and/or useless.

The hero often begins as a naïve or childlike figure but is forced by circumstances to mature rapidly, experiencing a considerable gain in fighting or problem-solving abilities along the way. The progress of the story leads to the character's learning the nature of the unknown forces against them, that they constitute a force with great power and malevolence. The villains in such stories are usually completely evil and unrelatable.

The romances of William Morris, such as The Well at the World's End, set in an imaginary medieval world, are sometimes regarded as the first examples of high fantasy. Other early examples of the genre are some works of American novelist James Branch Cabell which were set in a fictional world inspired by medieval France and published starting in 1919, known collectively as Biography of the Life of Manuel. E.R. Eddison's novels The Worm Ouroboros (1922) and the Zimiamvian Trilogy (1935–1958) are also important in epic fantasy.

The works of English writer J. R. R. Tolkien, especially The Lord of the Rings (1954–55), are regarded as archetypal works of high fantasy.

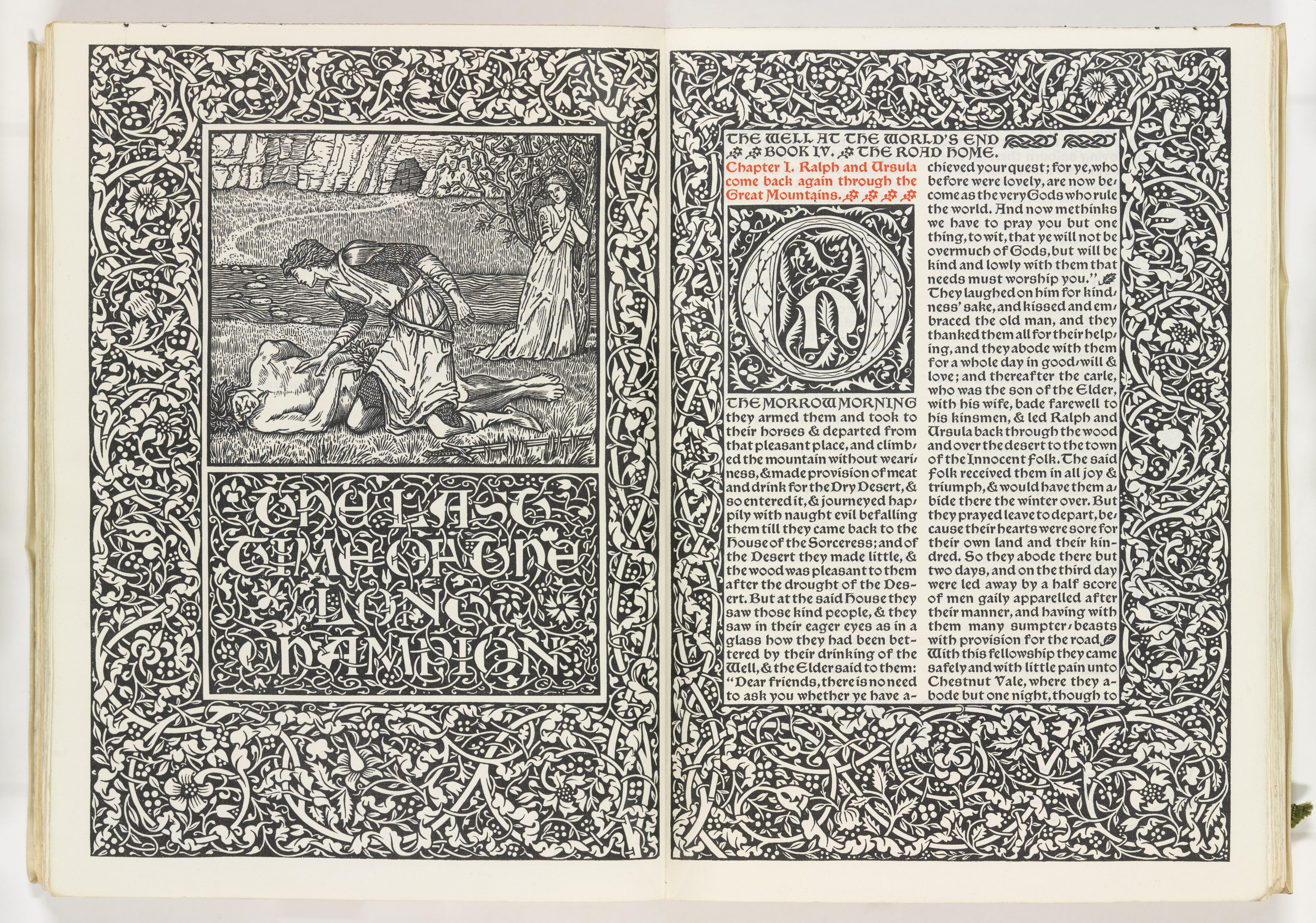
The Well at the World's End (1896) by William Morris is an early example of high fantasy fiction.

== Themes ==
High fantasy has often been defined by its themes and messages. "Good versus evil" is a common one in high fantasy, and defining the character of evil is often an important theme in a work of high fantasy, such as The Lord of the Rings. The importance of the concept of good and evil can be regarded as the distinguishing mark between high fantasy and sword and sorcery. In many works of high fantasy, this conflict marks a deep concern with moral issues; in other works, the conflict is a power struggle, with, for instance, wizards behaving irresponsibly whether they are "good" or "evil".

== Game settings ==
Role-playing games such as Dungeons & Dragons with campaign settings like Dragonlance by Tracy Hickman and Margaret Weis and Forgotten Realms by Ed Greenwood are a common basis for many fantasy books and many other authors continue to contribute to the settings.

== See also ==
- Sword and sorcery – Genre of fantasy fiction
- Historical fantasy – Genre of fiction
- List of genres
- List of high fantasy fiction
- Low fantasy – Subgenre of fantasy fiction defined by a "mundane" setting
