= Geoffrey Whitworth =

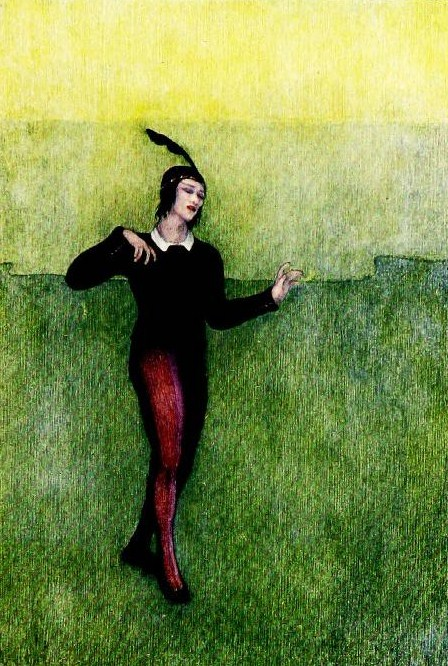
Image from scanned copy of "The Art of Nijinsky" by Geoffrey Whitworth, published in 1913

Geoffrey Arundel Whitworth CBE (7 April 1883 – 9 September 1951) was an English lecturer and author who sought to promote amateur and professional theatre through the formation of the British Drama League, acting as its director for many years. Whitworth was instrumental in the founding of the National Theatre, and served the committee lobbying for this as its secretary. Though not an actor, he was praised by George Bernard Shaw as one of the most important figures in the history of British theatre. The library he assembled is a large and important collection, now held at the Theatre Museum at Covent Garden.

From 1919 until 1948, Whitworth edited the League's magazine, Drama. He was the drama critic of John O'London's Weekly (1922) and the Christian Science Monitor (1923). In 1924–5, he organized the theatre section of the British Empire Exhibition at Wembley.

Whitworth was a fellow of the Royal Society of Literature and an author. His works include a translation of The Legend of Tyl Ulenspiegel (1918) and a novel, The Bells of Paradise (1918). He wrote two notable plays, Father Noah (1918) and Haunted Houses (1934) as well as works on the theatre, The Theatre of my Heart (1930; revised 1938), The Making of a National Theatre (1951) and The Civic Theatre Scheme (1942).

Whitworth's wife, Phyllis Whitworth, also worked on behalf of the League. Between 1924 and 1931, she also directed and managed the Three Hundred Club for staging plays likely at first to have a limited audience. She died in 1964.
