= Zimiamvian Trilogy =

Fantasy novel series

The Zimiamvian Trilogy is a series of fantasy novels by English author E. R. Eddison.

- Mistress of Mistresses (1935)
- A Fish Dinner in Memison (1941)
- The Mezentian Gate (1958)

Some chapters in each of the novels take place on Earth in the 20th century, but the novels are largely set in a parallel world named Zimiamvia, which primarily comprises the Three Kingdoms of Fingiswold, Meszria and Rerek (though other lands, such as Akkama, are also referred to).

The internal chronology of the books is the reverse of the order in which they were written and published, and they can be read in any way, since each book stands by itself.

== Scholarship ==
Literary critic Don D'Ammassa has claimed that the Zimiamvian trilogy has "powerfully drawn" characters, especially the villains. He notes that none of the protagonists, with the exception of Lessingham, comes across as "entirely admirable".

All the books contain a romantic ethic of fame, fate and eternal recurrence, in which the supreme value is chivalry, both in the sense of heroism and in the sense of idealization of women. In Mistress of Mistresses the underlying philosophy is a pantheism similar to that espoused by Baruch Spinoza, pantheism mysteriously combined with polytheism (characters routinely swear by "the Gods"). There are both a supreme male God, named as Zeus in The Mezentian Gate, whose avatars include Duke Barganax and Lessingham, and a supreme Goddess, identified with the eternal feminine and with Aphrodite, and temporarily incarnated in the two queens whom Lessingham serves.
