= E. R. Eddison =

British author of epic fantasy

E. R. Eddison CB, CMG
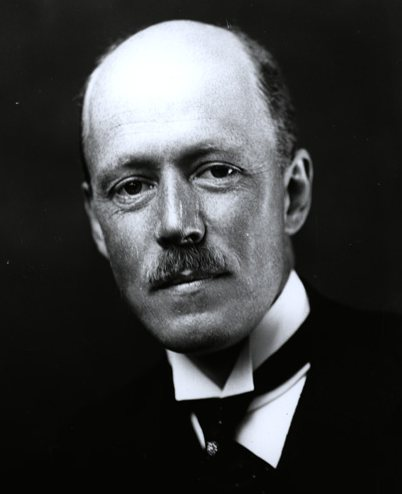
- Eddison c.1922
- Born: Eric Rücker Eddison; 24 November 1882; Adel, Leeds, Yorkshire, England
- Died: 18 August 1945 (aged 62); Marlborough, Wiltshire, England
- Occupations: Civil servant, writer

Eric Rücker Eddison, CB, CMG (24 November 1882 – 18 August 1945) was an English civil servant and author, writing epic fantasy novels under the name E. R. Eddison. His best-known works include The Worm Ouroboros (1922) and the Zimiamvian Trilogy (1935–1958).

== Biography ==
Born in Adel, Leeds, Eddison's early education came from a series of private tutors, whom he shared with the young Arthur Ransome. Ransome recalls Eddison's daring and Machiavellian methods of getting rid of unpopular teachers in his autobiography. Afterwards Eddison was educated at Eton and Trinity College, Oxford and joined the Board of Trade in 1906, retiring in 1938 to work full-time on his fiction. He was also a member of the Viking Society for Northern Research. During a distinguished career he was appointed a Companion of the Order of St. Michael and St. George in 1924 and a Companion of the Order of the Bath in 1929 for public service with the Board of Trade. He and his wife, Winifred, had one child, a daughter. Their son-in-law, Kenneth Hesketh Higson, a Royal Air Force pilot, died in an air fight over Italy in the Second World War.

== Writing ==
Eddison is best known for the early romance The Worm Ouroboros (1922) and for three volumes set in the imaginary world Zimiamvia, known as the Zimiamvian Trilogy: Mistress of Mistresses (1935), A Fish Dinner in Memison (1941), and The Mezentian Gate (1958).

Eddison was an occasional member of the Inklings, an informal literary discussion group associated with the University of Oxford. His early works of high fantasy drew both praise and criticism from the Inkling J. R. R. Tolkien, who stated that he read Eddison "with great enjoyment for their sheer literary merit", but "disliked his characters" and found his "evil and indeed silly 'philosophy'" tending to "arrogance and cruelty". He was praised, too, by C. S. Lewis, also an Inkling. When Lewis had to go into a nursing home, he asked his secretary to bring him two books: The Worm Ouroboros and Virgil's Aeneid. Later, Eddison's early works were praised by Ursula K. Le Guin. Tolkien generally approved of Eddison's literary style, but found the underlying philosophy unpleasant and unattractive; while Eddison in turn thought Tolkien's views "soft". Other admirers of Eddison's work included James Stephens, who wrote the introduction to the 1922 edition; James Branch Cabell, who provided a foreword for the 1926 American edition; Robert Silverberg, who described The Worm Ouroboros as "the greatest high fantasy of them all"; and Clive Barker.

Eddison's books are written in a meticulously recreated Jacobean prose style, seeded throughout with fragments, often acknowledged but often directly copied from his favorite authors and genres: Homer and Sappho, Shakespeare and Webster, Norse sagas and French medieval lyric poems. Critic Andy Sawyer has noted that such fragments seem to arise naturally from the "barbarically sophisticated" worlds Eddison has created. The books exhibit a thoroughly aristocratic sensibility; heroes and villains alike maintain an Olympian indifference to convention. Fellow fantasy author Michael Moorcock wrote that Eddison's characters, particularly his villains, are more vivid than Tolkien's. Others have observed that while it is historically accurate to depict the great of the world trampling on the lower classes, Eddison's characters often treat their subjects with arrogance and insolence, and this is depicted as part of their greatness. Indeed, at the end of The Worm Ouroboros, the heroes, finding peace dull, pray for – and get – the revival of their enemies, so that they may go and fight them again. The historian of fantasy Brian Attebery notes that "Eddison's fantasies uphold a code that is unabashedly Nietzschean; had he written after World War II, his enthusiasm for supermen and heroic conflict might perhaps have been tempered".

The Zimiamvia books were conceived not as a trilogy but as part of a larger work left incomplete at Eddison's death. The Mezentian Gate itself is unfinished, though Eddison provided summaries of the missing chapters shortly before his death. C. S. Lewis wrote a blurb for the cover of The Mezentian Gate when it was published calling Eddison's works "first and foremost, of art."

Eddison wrote three other books: Poems, Letters, and Memories of Philip Sidney Nairn (1916), Styrbiorn the Strong (1926) and Egil's Saga (1930). The first was his tribute to a Trinity College friend, a poet, who, according to this source, died May 18, 1914, age 30, in Malaya, where he was a colonial administrator. According to another, possibly less reliable source, he is said to have died in his youth during World War I. The other two relate to Scandinavian saga literature; the first is a historical novel which retells Styrbjarnar þáttr Svíakappa (alluded to in Eyrbyggja Saga and Heimskringla). The second is a direct translation from Egil's saga, supplemented with extensive notes, some which explain Eddison's aesthetic and philosophical outlook.

In the 1960s Eddison’s wife, Winifred, bequeathed many of his original manuscripts and notes to the Leeds Central Library.

== Bibliography ==
- The Worm Ouroboros (1922). London: Jonathan Cape

=== Zimiamvia ===
1. Mistress of Mistresses (1935). London: Faber and Faber.
2. A Fish Dinner in Memison (1941). New York: E. P. Dutton & Co.
3. The Mezentian Gate (1958, restored 1992). London: HarperCollins

Omnibus editions:

- Zimiamvia: A Trilogy (1992). New York: Dell Publishing. ISBN 0-440-50300-0.
- The Complete Zimiamvia (2014). HarperCollins

=== Norse ===
1. Styrbiorn the Strong (1926). London: Jonathan Cape.
2. Egil's Saga (1930). London: Cambridge University Press. (translation)

=== Non-fiction ===
- Poems, Letters, and Memories of Philip Sidney Nairn (1916). London: Printed for Private Circulation.
- Chisholm, Hugh, ed. (1922). "Profiteering" . Encyclopædia Britannica (12th ed.). London & New York: The Encyclopædia Britannica Company. (in part)
